= St. Casimir Parish =

St. Casimir Parish may refer to several Roman Catholic parishes:

- St. Casimir Parish, Terryville, Connecticut
- St. Casimir Parish, South Bend, Indiana
  - St. Casimir Parish Historic District
- St. Casimir Parish, Maynard, Massachusetts
- St. Casimir Parish, New Bedford, Massachusetts, a Polish-American Roman Catholic parish in New England
- St. Casimir Parish, Warren, Rhode Island
