= Saint Hedwig =

Saint Hedwig or Saint Hedwig's may refer to:

== People ==
- Hedwig of Silesia (1174–1243), Catholic saint and Duchess of Silesia and of Greater Poland.
- Jadwiga of Poland (1373 or 1374–1399), also spelled Hedwig, Catholic saint and first queen of Poland

== Roman Catholic parishes in the United States ==
- St. Hedwig Parish, Union City, Connecticut
- St. Hedwig Parish, Cambridge, Massachusetts
- St. Hedwig Parish, Southbridge, Massachusetts

== Churches ==
- St. Hedwig's Cathedral, Berlin
- St. Hedwig of Silesia Church, Radoszowy, Poland
- St. Hedwig's Church (Chicago), Illinois, United States
- St. Hedwig's (Milwaukee), Wisconsin, United States

== Other uses ==
- St. Hedwig, Texas, a town in the United States
- St. Hedwig Cemetery (disambiguation)
