= Holy Trinity Parish =

Holy Trinity Parish may refer to the following parishes:

- Holy Trinity, Antigua and Barbuda, a first-level civil administrative division of Antigua and Barbuda coinciding with Barbuda
- Holy Trinity Parish (Lubin), Poland
- Holy Trinity Parish, Hatfield, Massachusetts
- Holy Trinity Parish, Lawrence, Massachusetts
- Holy Trinity Parish (Lowell, Massachusetts)
- Holy Trinity Parish, Westfield, Massachusetts
