= St. Andrew Bobola Church =

St. Andrew Bobola Church may refer to:

- Saint Andrew Bobola's Church, Bydgoszcz, Poland
- St Andrew Bobola Church, Hammersmith, London, United Kingdom

== See also ==
- St. Andrew Bobola Parish, Dudley, Massachusetts, United States
