= Our Lady of the Rosary Parish, Springfield =

Coordinates: 42°06′50.5″N 72°35′22″W

Our Lady of the Rosary Parish
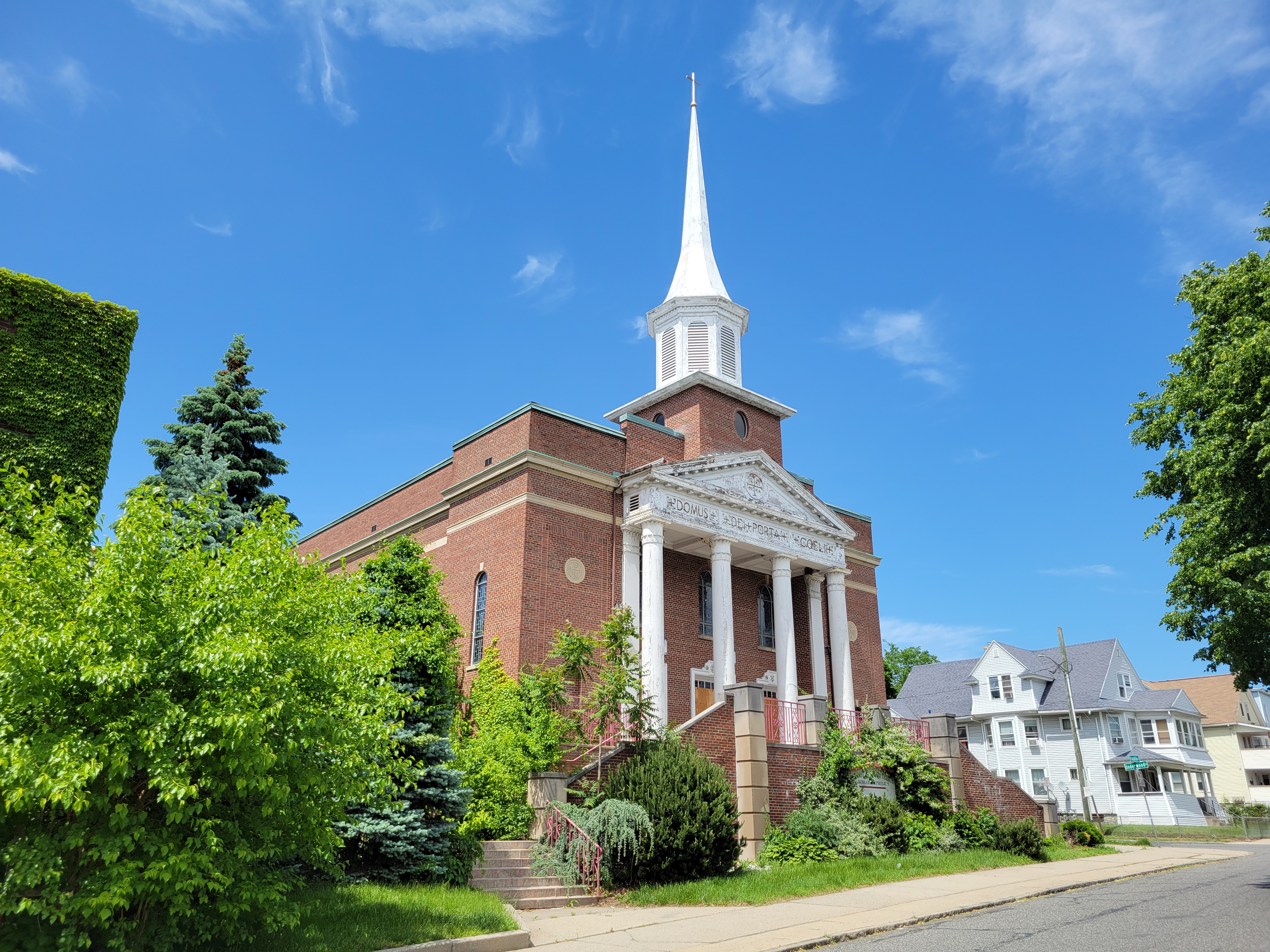
- Our Lady of the Rosary Church
- Our Lady of the Rosary Parish
- Location: 346 Franklin Street; Springfield, Massachusetts
- Country: United States
- Denomination: Roman Catholic

History
- Founded: 1917
- Founder: Polish immigrants
- Dedication: Our Lady of the Rosary

Architecture
- Closed: January 28, 2018

Administration
- Division: Region 9
- Province: Boston
- Diocese: Springfield in Massachusetts

Clergy
- Bishop: Most Rev. Timothy A. McDonnell

Our Lady of the Rosary Parish - designated for Polish immigrants in Springfield, Massachusetts, United States.

Founded 1917. It is one of the Polish-American Roman Catholic parishes in New England in the Diocese of Springfield in Massachusetts.

The Diocese of Springfield announced that the parish would close after Mass on January 28, 2018, owing to declining attendance and maintenance issues. Immaculate Conception Parish will serve as the receiving parish.

== Bibliography ==
- The 150th Anniversary of Polish-American Pastoral Ministry. Webster, Massachusetts: St. Joseph Basilica. September 11, 2005.
- The Official Catholic Directory in USA
