= Sacred Heart Parish, Greenfield =

Coordinates: 42°35′5.8″N 72°36′3.3″W

Sacred Heart Parish
- Sacred Heart Parish
- Location: Deerfield Street; Greenfield, Massachusetts
- Country: United States
- Denomination: Roman Catholic

History
- Founded: 1914
- Founder: Polish immigrants
- Dedication: Sacred Heart

Administration
- Division: Region 5
- Province: Boston
- Diocese: Springfield in Massachusetts

Clergy
- Bishop: Most Rev. Timothy A. McDonnell
- Pastor: Rev. Stanley Aksamit

Sacred Heart of Jesus Parish was a parish of the Roman Catholic Church designated for Polish immigrants in Greenfield, Massachusetts. Founded 1914, it was one of the Polish-American Roman Catholic parishes in New England in the Diocese of Springfield in Massachusetts. The diocese closed the parish in 2009.

== History ==
The Greenfield Polish community had become well established by 1910, the church beginning to offer mass in the Polish language. The parish grew large enough by 1920 to support and establish their own church facility. A survey of Polish parishes taken during World War II showed 944 members of the community, with 153 members serving in the military and four having died during military service.

Though the parish closed in 2009, the community still honored the church with several celebrations in 2011. After closing, the parish was joined with the "Our Lady of Peace" parish community.

== Sources ==
- The 150'th Anniversary of Polish-American Pastoral Ministry. Webster, Massachusetts: St. Joseph Basilica. September 11, 2005.
- A short parish history the 1962 Jubilee Book. Sacred Heart Parish - Greenfield MA: the internet Polish Genealogical Source.
- The Official Catholic Directory in USA
- Thompson, Francis McGee; Kellogg, Lucy Jane Cutler; Severance, Charles Sidney (1954). History of Greenfield, shire town of Franklin county, Massachusetts. Vol. 3.
- Jones, Irmarie (1983). Franklin County Churches. Greenfield Community College, Pioneer Valley Studies.
