= All Saints Parish, Housatonic =

Coordinates: 42°15′09″N 73°22′6.7″W

All Saints Parish
- All Saints Parish
- Location: 125 Front Street; Housatonic, Massachusetts
- Country: United States
- Denomination: Roman Catholic

History
- Founded: 1913
- Founder: Polish immigrants
- Dedication: All Saints

Architecture
- Closed: 2009

Administration
- Division: Region 3
- Province: Boston
- Diocese: Diocese of Springfield in Massachusetts

All Saints Parish - designated for Polish immigrants in Housatonic, Massachusetts, United States.

Founded 1913. It is one of the Polish-American Roman Catholic parishes in New England in the Diocese of Springfield in Massachusetts.

In 2009 merged with the Corpus Christi Parish into one.

== Bibliography ==
- The 150th Anniversary of Polish-American Pastoral Ministry. Webster, Massachusetts: St. Joseph Basilica. September 11, 2005.
- The Official Catholic Directory in USA
