= St. Peter Parish, Norwood =

St. Peter Parish
- St. Peter Parish
- 42°11′40″N 71°12′02″W
- Location: Norwood, Massachusetts
- Country: United States
- Denomination: Roman Catholic

History
- Founded: 1918
- Founder: Polish immigrants
- Dedication: St. Peter

Architecture
- Closed: August 3, 1997

Administration
- Division: Vicariate IV
- District: West Pastoral Region
- Province: Boston
- Archdiocese: Boston

St. Peter Parish was a church designated for Polish immigrants in Norwood, Massachusetts, United States.

It was founded in 1918. It was one of the Polish-American Roman Catholic parishes in New England in the Archdiocese of Boston.

The parish was closed August 3, 1997.

== Bibliography ==
- Our Lady of Czestochowa Parish - Centennial 1893-1993
- The Official Catholic Directory in USA
