= St. Joseph Church (Ansonia, Connecticut) =

Coordinates: 41°20′24.5″N 73°04′18.6″W

St. Joseph Parish
- St. Joseph Parish
- Location: 32 Jewett Street; Ansonia, Connecticut
- Country: United States
- Denomination: Roman Catholic
- Website: Parish website

History
- Founded: 1925
- Founder: Polish immigrants
- Dedication: St. Joseph
- Dedicated: September 6, 1926

Administration
- Division: Vicariate: Waterbury
- Province: Hartford
- Archdiocese: Hartford
- Parish: Congregation of the Mission

Clergy
- Archbishop: Most Rev. Leonard Paul Blair, S.T.D.
- Bishop(s): Most Rev. Christie Macaluso, D.D.
- Pastor: Rev. Tadeusz Maciejewski C.M.

St. Joseph Parish is a church designated for Polish immigrants in Ansonia, Connecticut, United States.

Founded in 1925, it is one of the Polish-American Roman Catholic parishes in New England in the Archdiocese of Hartford.

== History ==
In June 1925, Bishop John J. Nilan appointed Vincentian Fr. Aloysius Zielenznik, C.M., as pastor of the new St. Joseph Parish. The priest's first Mass for the Polish congregation was celebrated on July 12, 1925, at a Central St. hall rented from an Italian society. The church was dedicated on September 6, 1926. Ten days later, St. Joseph School opened, staffed by the Sisters of the Holy Family of Nazareth.

The parish had long felt the need of a church bell that would summon the faithful to church services. Their desires to have a church bell were realized in 1950 when Fr. Casimir Kwiatkowski passed through Winchester, New Hampshire, and noticed a bell for sale in front of a Protestant church. He made inquiry and purchased the bell, valued at $3,000, for $495. On the occasion of administering the sacrament of Confirmation in the parish, October 14, 1950, Bishop Henry J. O'Brien, D.D. blessed the century-old bell and named it Casimir. The bell was rung for the first time on November 1, 1950, the day the dogma of the Assumption was solemnly proclaimed in Rome by Pope Pius XII.

== Pastors ==
- Fr. Aloysius Zielenznik C.M. (1925–1929)
- Fr. Joseph Janowski C.M. (1929–1936)
- Fr. Casimir Kwiatkowski C.M. (1936-)
- ...
- Fr. Marek Sobczak C.M.
- Fr. Roman Kmieć C.M.
- Fr. Tadeusz Maciejewski C.M.

== School ==
- St. Joseph School

== Bibliography ==
- A short parish history from the 1951 Jubilee Book. St. Joseph Parish - Ansonia CT: the internet Polish Genealogical Source.
- The Official Catholic Directory in USA
