= St. Mary Parish, Torrington =

Coordinates: 41°48′36.2″N 73°07′40.4″W

St. Mary Parish
- St. Mary Parish
- Location: 85 Pulaski Street, Torrington, Connecticut
- Country: United States
- Denomination: Roman Catholic

History
- Founded: October 26, 1919
- Founder: Polish immigrants
- Dedication: St. Mary
- Dedicated: October 5, 1921

Architecture
- Closed: 2017

Administration
- Division: Vicariate: Waterbury
- Province: Hartford
- Archdiocese: Hartford

St. Mary Parish was a Catholic Church parish in Torrington, Connecticut, in the United States. Founded on October 26, 1919, it is one of the Polish-American Roman Catholic parishes in New England in the Archdiocese of Hartford. The parish church, St. Mary of Częstochowa, closed in 2017 and St. Mary parish merged with four other parishes to form St. John Paul the Great Parish.

== History ==
On October 26, 1919, St. Mary Parish was created when Fr. John Kowalski was named first pastor. He celebrated the first Masses for St. Mary in St. Francis chapel. A basement church was completed in 1921 and dedicated on October 5, 1921, by Bishop John Joseph Nilan. The completed church was dedicated on May 30, 1927.

St. Mary parish merged with St. Francis of Assisi, St. Peter, and Sacred Heart parishes in June 2017 to form St. John Paul the Great Parish. St. Mary and Sacred Heart churches were advertised for sale in January 2019.

== Bibliography ==
- The 150th Anniversary of Polish-American Pastoral Ministry. Webster, Massachusetts: St. Joseph Basilica. September 11, 2005.
- The Official Catholic Directory in USA
