= St. Stanislaus Bishop & Martyr's Parish (Chelsea, Massachusetts) =

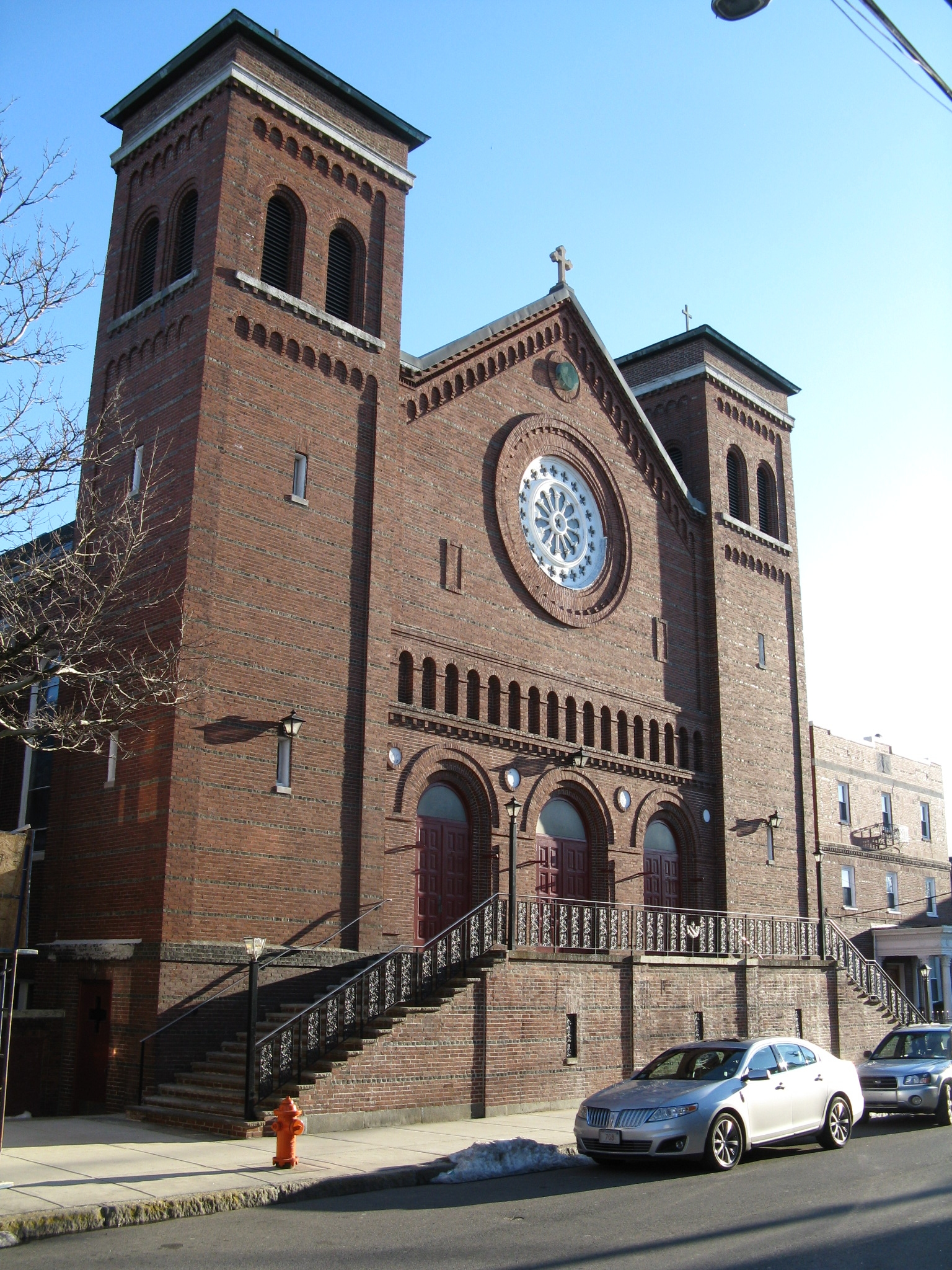
- St. Stanislaus Bishop & Martyr's Parish
- 42°23′30″N 71°02′15″W
- Location: Chelsea, Massachusetts
- Country: United States
- Denomination: Roman Catholic
- Website: Parish website

History
- Founded: 1905
- Founder: Polish immigrants
- Dedication: St. Stanislaus Bishop & Martyr

Architecture
- Closed: Aug 30, 2020

Administration
- Division: Vicariate IV
- District: North Pastoral Region
- Province: Boston
- Archdiocese: Boston

Clergy
- Archbishop: Seán Patrick O'Malley

St. Stanislaus Bishop & Martyr's Parish is a catholic church designated for Polish immigrants in Chelsea, Massachusetts, United States.

It was founded in 1905 as a Polish-American Roman Catholic parish in New England in the Archdiocese of Boston. The architect was Edward T. P. Graham.

== Bibliography ==
- A short parish history the 1955 Jubilee Book. St. Stanislaus Parish - Chelsea MA: the internet Polish Genealogical Source.
