= SS. Cyril and Methodius Parish, Hartford =

Coordinates: 41°45′30.2″N 72°40′20.3″W

SS. Cyril and Methodius Parish
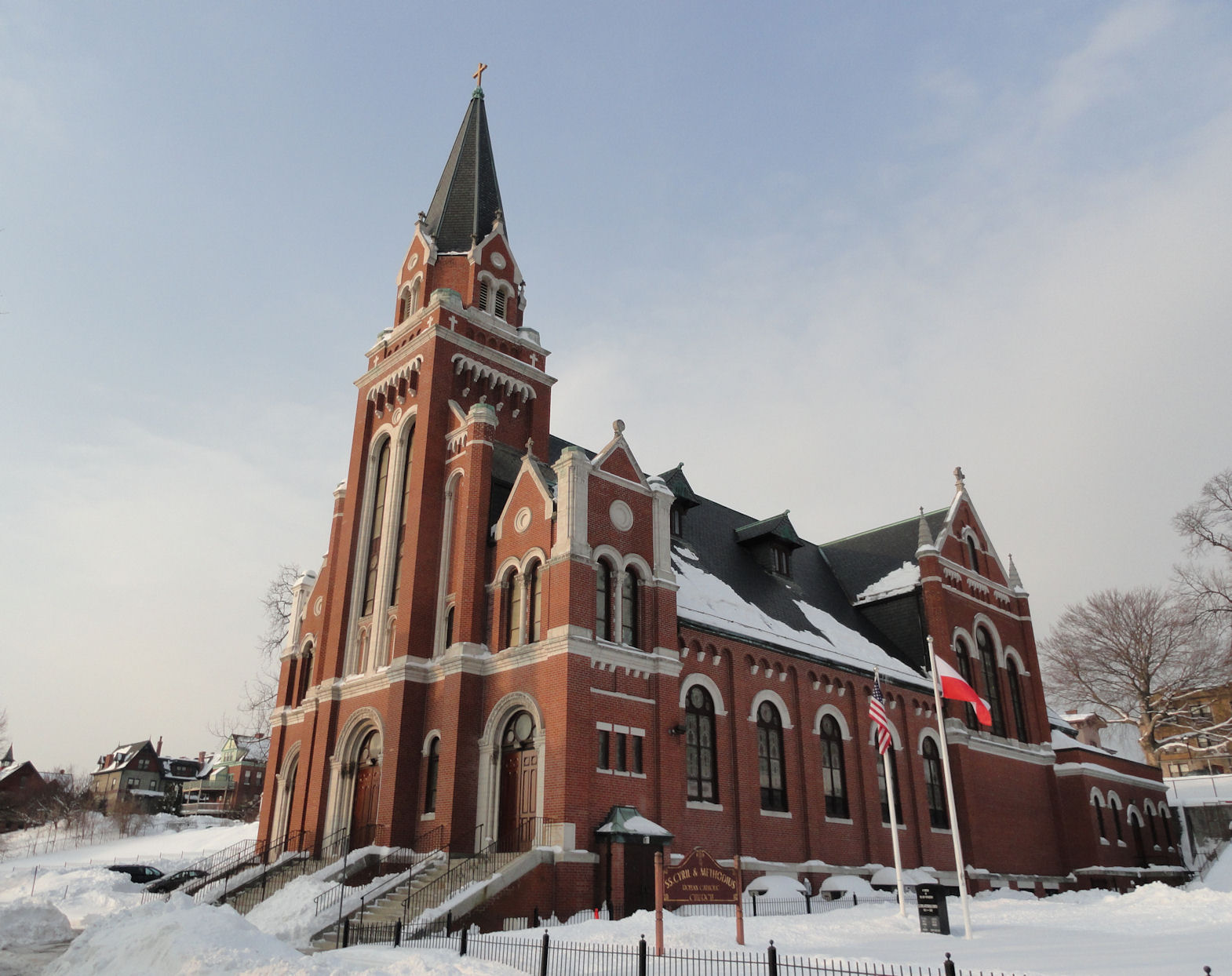
- SS. Cyril and Methodius Church (Hartford, CT); Timothy G. O'Connell architect
- SS. Cyril and Methodius Parish
- Location: 55 Charter Oak Avenue; Hartford, Connecticut
- Country: United States
- Denomination: Roman Catholic
- Website: Parish website

History
- Founded: April 6, 1902
- Founder: Polish immigrants
- Dedication: SS. Cyril and Methodius

Architecture
- Architect: Timothy G. O'Connell

Administration
- Division: Vicariate: Hartford
- Province: Hartford
- Archdiocese: Hartford

Clergy
- Archbishop: Most Rev. Leonard Paul Blair, S.T.D.
- Bishop(s): Most Rev. Christie Macaluso, D.D.
- Vicar: Rev. Andrzej Pogorzelski
- Pastor: Rev. Adam Hurbanczuk

SS. Cyril and Methodius Parish (Polish: Parafia św. Cyryla i Metodego w Hartford) - one of the Polish-American Roman Catholic parishes in New England in the Archdiocese of Hartford. Founded on April 6, 1902, it is designated for Polish immigrants in Hartford, Connecticut, United States.

== History ==
In January 1901, the recently ordained Fr. Stanislaus Lozowski was assigned as curate to serve the Polish immigrants at St. Peter Parish. On April 6, 1902, Bishop of Hartford Michael Tierney established SS. Cyril and Methodius Parish for Polish immigrants, with Fr. Lozowski appointed founding pastor. The first parish Mass was celebrated in St. Peter's basement. A small wooden church was dedicated on Governor St. The cornerstone of a large brick church was blessed on July 9, 1916.

== Clergy ==
=== Current ===
- Rev. Adam Hurbanczuk, Pastor, November 4, 2011 – Present.
- Rev. Andrzej Pogorzelski, Vicar, November 4, 2011 – 2023.

=== Former Pastors ===
1. Rev. Stanislaus Lozowski
2. Rev. William Przybylo, 1990–2008
3. Rev. Adam C. Subocz, 2008 - October 2011
4. Rev. Adam Hurbanczuk, November 2011 - Present

=== Former Vicars ===
1. Rev. Kazimirerz Heisig, Vicar † - September 2011.

† = deceased

== Sources ==
- Kumor, Bolesław (1985). SS. Cyril and Methodius Parish and the Hartford Polonia 1873-1980. Garrett Printing Inc. ISBN 978-0-9609702-1-6.
- The 150th Anniversary of Polish-American Pastoral Ministry. Webster, Massachusetts: St. Joseph Basilica. September 11, 2005.
- The Official Catholic Directory in USA
