= Polish-American Catholic parishes in New England =

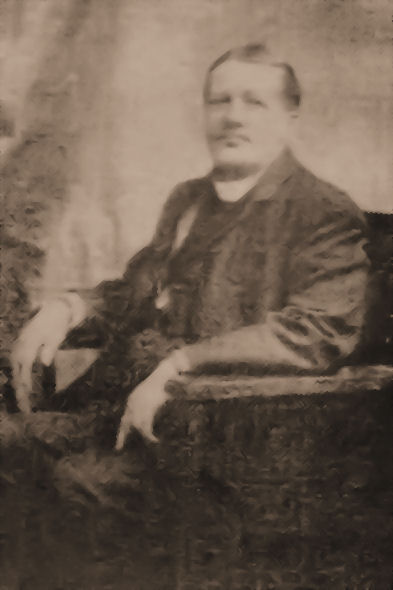
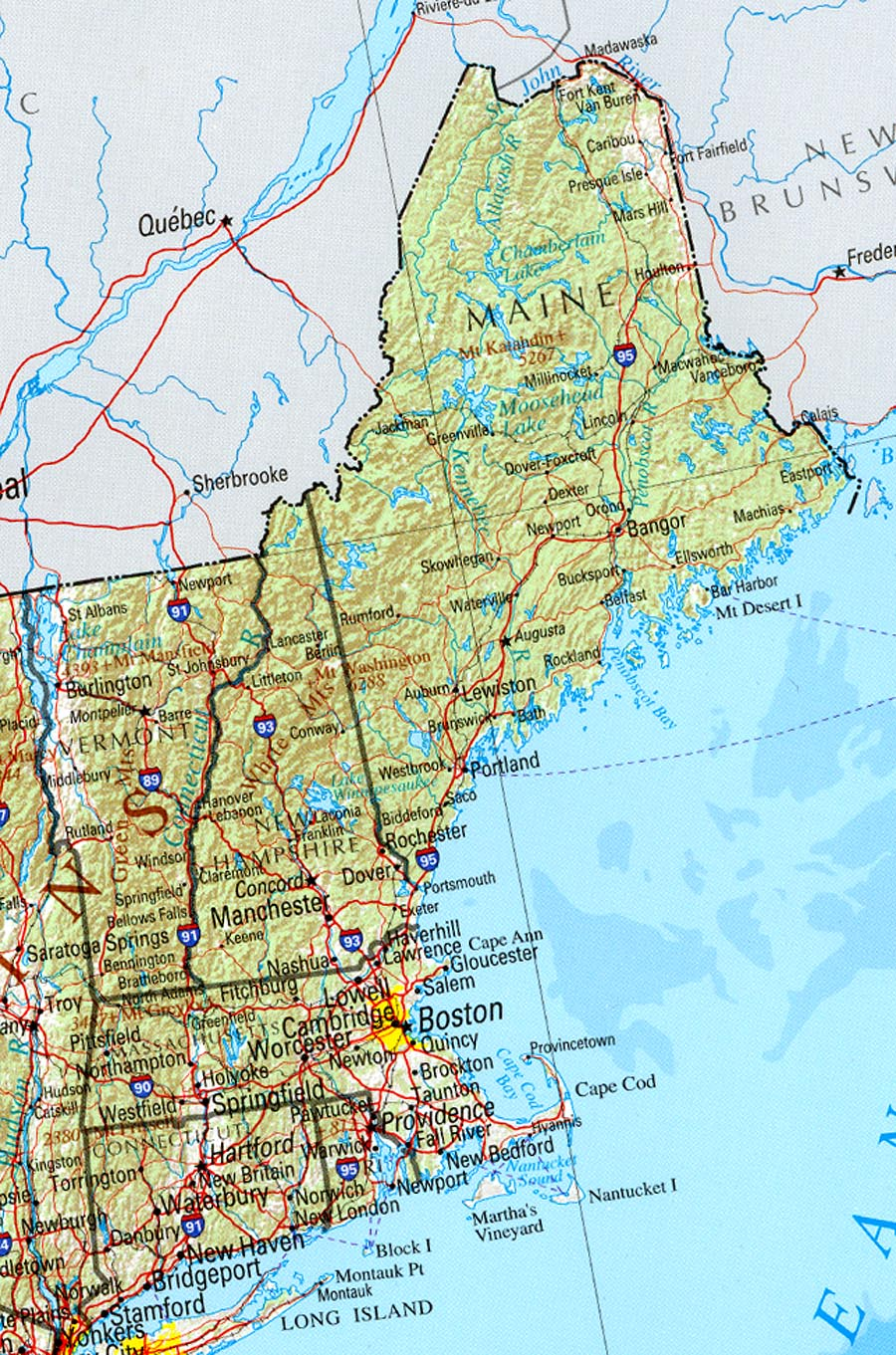
Left: Fr. Franciszek Chalupka, founder of the first parishes in New England. Right: A 2001 map of New England.

A number of Polish-American Catholic parishes were founded by Polish immigrants in New England, United States from 1887. There are 78 such parishes in 10 dioceses.

Fr Franciszek Chalupka was the founder of the first Polish-American parishes in New England.

Parish	Parafia (Polish)	City	Archdiocese or Diocese	State	Established date	Closed date	Mass in Polish
Our Lady of Czestochowa	Matki Boskiej Częstochowskiej	Boston	Boston	Massachusetts	1893		Yes
Our Lady of Ostrobrama	Matki Boskiej Ostrobramskiej	Brockton	Boston	Massachusetts	1914	2001	
St. Hedwig	Św. Jadwigi	Cambridge	Boston	Massachusetts	1907	1995	
St. Stanislaus Bishop & Martyr	Św. Stanisława Biskupa i Męczennika	Chelsea	Boston	Massachusetts	1905	2020	
St. Michael the Archangel	Św. Michała Archanioła	Haverhill	Boston	Massachusetts	1901	1998	
St. Adalbert	Św. Wojciecha	Hyde Park	Boston	Massachusetts	1913	2011	
Sacred Heart	Najświętszego Serca Pana Jezusa	Ipswich	Boston	Massachusetts	1908	1999	
Holy Trinity	Trójcy Świętej	Lowell	Boston	Massachusetts	1904		Yes
Holy Trinity	Trójcy Świętej	Lawrence	Boston	Massachusetts	1905	2004	
St. Michael the Archangel	Św. Michała Archanioła	Lynn	Boston	Massachusetts	1906	2006	
St. Casimir	Św. Kazimierza	Maynard	Boston	Massachusetts	1912	1997	
St. Peter	Św. Piotra	Norwood	Boston	Massachusetts	1918	1997	
St. John the Baptist	Św. Jana Chrzciciela	Salem	Boston	Massachusetts	1903		Yes
Holy Cross	Świętego Krzyża	Fall River	Fall River	Massachusetts	1916	1997	
St. Stanislaus	Św. Stanisława Biskupa i Męczennika	Fall River	Fall River	Massachusetts	1898		No
St. Hedwig	Św. Jadwigi	New Bedford	Fall River	Massachusetts	1908	2004	
St. Casimir	Św. Kazimierza	New Bedford	Fall River	Massachusetts	1927	2000	
Our Lady of Perpetual Help	Matki Bożej Nieustającej Pomocy	New Bedford	Fall River	Massachusetts	1905	2022	
Our Lady of the Holy Rosary	Matki Bożej Królowej Różańca Świętego	Taunton	Fall River	Massachusetts	1909		No
St. Stanislaus Kostka	Św. Stanisława Kostki	Adams	Springfield	Massachusetts	1902	2009	
St. Anthony of Padua	Św. Antoniego z Padwy	Chicopee	Springfield	Massachusetts	1926	2009	
St. Stanislaus Bishop & Martyr	Św. Stanisława Biskupa i Męczennika	Chicopee	Springfield	Massachusetts	1891		Yes
Sacred Heart of Jesus	Najświętszego Serca Pana Jezusa	Easthampton	Springfield	Massachusetts	1909	2010	
Sacred Heart	Najświętszego Serca Pana Jezusa	Greenfield	Springfield	Massachusetts	1912	2009	
Holy Rosary	Różańca Świętego	Hadley	Springfield	Massachusetts	1916	1998	
Holy Trinity	Trójcy Świętej	Hatfield	Springfield	Massachusetts	1916	2009	
Mater Dolorosa	Matki Doloresy	Holyoke	Springfield	Massachusetts	1896	2011	
All Saints	Wszystkich Świętych	Housatonic	Springfield	Massachusetts	1913	2009	
Immaculate Conception	Niepokalanego Poczęcia Najświętszej Maryi Panny	Indian Orchard	Springfield	Massachusetts	1904		Yes
Christ the King	Chrystusa Króla	Ludlow	Springfield	Massachusetts	1948		Yes
St. John Cantius	Św. Jana Kantego	Northampton	Springfield	Massachusetts	1904	2010	
Holy Family	Świętej Rodziny	Pittsfield	Springfield	Massachusetts	1912	2008	
St. Stanislaus Bishop & Martyr	Św. Stanisława Biskupa i Męczennika	South Deerfield	Springfield	Massachusetts	1908	2009	
Our Lady of the Rosary	Matki Bożej Różańcowej	Springfield	Springfield	Massachusetts	1917	2018	
Immaculate Conception	Niepokalanego Poczęcia Najświętszej Maryi Panny	West Springfield	Springfield	Massachusetts	1905		
Sts. Peter and Paul/Divine Mercy Parish	Świętych Apostołów Piotra i Pawła/Parafia Miłosierdzia Bożego	Three Rivers	Springfield	Massachusetts	1903		Yes
Our Lady of Czestochowa	Matki Boskiej Częstochowskiej	Turners Falls	Springfield	Massachusetts	1909		No
St. Mary	Św. Marii	Ware	Springfield	Massachusetts	1905		Yes
Holy Trinity	Trójcy Świętej	Westfield	Springfield	Massachusetts	1903		Yes
Our Lady of Jasna Gora	Matki Bożej Jasnogórskiej	Clinton	Worcester	Massachusetts	1913	2010	
St. Andrew Bobola	Św. Andrzeja Boboli	Dudley	Worcester	Massachusetts	1963		Yes
St. Joseph	Św. Józefa	Gardner	Worcester	Massachusetts	1908	2015	
St. Hedwig	Św. Jadwigi	Southbridge	Worcester	Massachusetts	1916	2011	
St. Joseph	Św. Józefa	Webster	Worcester	Massachusetts	1887		Yes
St. Stanislaus	Św. Stanisława Biskupa i Męczennika	West Warren	Worcester	Massachusetts	1908		No
Our Lady of Czestochowa	Matki Boskiej Częstochowskiej	Worcester	Worcester	Massachusetts	1903		Yes
St. Louis	Św. Ludwika	Portland	Portland	Maine	1915		No
St. Joseph	Św. Józefa	Claremont	Manchester	New Hampshire	1922		No
St. Stanislaus	Św. Stanisława Biskupa i Męczennika	Nashua	Manchester	New Hampshire	1908		No
St. Joseph	Św. Józefa	Ansonia	Hartford	Connecticut	1925		Yes
St. Stanislaus Kostka	Św. Stanisława Kostki	Bristol	Hartford	Connecticut	1919		Yes
St. Michael the Archangel	Św. Michała Archanioła	Derby	Hartford	Connecticut	1905		Yes
St. Adalbert	Św. Wojciecha	Enfield	Hartford	Connecticut	1915	2024	
SS. Cyril and Methodius	Św. Cyryla i Metodego	Hartford	Hartford	Connecticut	1902		Yes
St. Stanislaus Bishop & Martyr	Św. Stanisława Biskupa i Męczennika	Meriden	Hartford	Connecticut	1891		Yes
Sacred Heart	Najświętszego Serca Pana Jezusa	New Britain	Hartford	Connecticut	1894		Yes
Holy Cross	Świętego Krzyża	New Britain	Hartford	Connecticut	1927		Yes
St. Stanislaus Bishop & Martyr	Św. Stanisława Biskupa i Męczennika	New Haven	Hartford	Connecticut	1901		Yes
Immaculate Conception	Niepokalanego Poczęcia Najświętszej Maryi Panny	Southington	Hartford	Connecticut	1915	2022	
St. Joseph	Św. Józefa	Suffield	Hartford	Connecticut	1916	2017	
St. Casimir	Św. Kazimierza	Terryville	Hartford	Connecticut	1906		No
St. Mary	Najświętszej Maryi Panny	Torrington	Hartford	Connecticut	1919	2017	
St. Hedwig	Św. Jadwigi	Union City	Hartford	Connecticut	1906	2017	
SS. Peter and Paul	Świętych Apostołów Piotra i Pawła	Wallingford	Hartford	Connecticut	1924		No
St. Stanislaus Kostka	Św. Stanisława Kostki	Waterbury	Hartford	Connecticut	1913	2017	
St. Michael the Archangel	Św. Michała Archanioła	Bridgeport	Bridgeport	Connecticut	1899		Yes
Sacred Heart of Jesus	Najświętszego Serca Pana Jezusa	Danbury	Bridgeport	Connecticut	1925		No
St. Anthony of Padua	Św. Antoniego z Padwy	Fairfield	Bridgeport	Connecticut	1927		No
Holy Name of Jesus	Najświętszego Imienia Jezus	Stamford	Bridgeport	Connecticut	1903		Yes
St. Mary of Czestochowa	Św. Marii Częstochowskiej	Middletown	Norwich	Connecticut	1903		Yes
St. Joseph	Św. Józefa	Norwich	Norwich	Connecticut	1904		Yes
Our Lady of Perpetual Help	Matki Bożej Nieustającej Pomocy	Quaker Hill	Norwich	Connecticut	1904		No
St. Joseph	Św. Józefa	Rockville	Norwich	Connecticut	1905		Yes
St. Joseph	Św. Józefa	Central Falls	Providence	Rhode Island	1905		Yes
Our Lady of Czestochowa	Matki Boskiej Częstochowskiej	Coventry	Providence	Rhode Island	1905		No
St. Adalbert	Św. Wojciecha	Providence	Providence	Rhode Island	1902		Yes
St. Casimir	Św. Kazimierza	Warren	Providence	Rhode Island	1908	2017	
St. Stanislaus Kostka	Św. Stanisława Kostki	Woonsocket	Providence	Rhode Island	1905		Yes

- Media related to Churches built by Polish immigrants in New England at Wikimedia Commons

== Resources ==
1. Dolores A. Liptak, "The Bishops of Hartford and the New Immigrants (1880-1920)", U.S. Catholic Historian, Vol. 1, No. 2 (Winter - Spring, 1981), pp. 37–53.
2. The Official Catholic Directory in USA
3. Polish Churches in the United States in 1944. the Polish Museum of America, Chicago, IL. 1999. Archived from the original on 2012-04-14.
4. Wisniowski, Rafal (1966). List of Polish Parishes from The Official Catholic Directory - 1966 (PDF). Archiwum Orchard lake.
5. US States - Parish Histories. the internet Polish Genealogical Source.
6. The 150th Anniversary of Polish-American Pastoral Ministry. Webster, Massachusetts: St. Joseph Basilica. September 11, 2005.
7. Roman Catholic Parishes of Polish Ethnicity in USA
8. Cities & Towns in each Massachusetts Roman Catholic Diocese
9. Archdiocese of Boston
10. Diocese of Fall River
11. Diocese of Springfield
12. Diocese of Worcester
13. Diocese of Manchester
14. Diocese of Portland
15. Archdiocese of Hartford
16. Diocese of Bridgeport
17. Diocese of Norwich
18. Diocese of Providence
19. Diocese of Burlington

== See also ==
- Rev. Philiposki, S.Ch., Richard (May 4, 2009). The Vanishing Polish Ethnic Parish in America (PDF). Naród Polski, No. 9 - Vol. CXXIII, Page 11.
