= Christ the King Parish, Ludlow =

Coordinates: 42°09′50″N 72°28′55″W

Christ the King Parish
- Parafia Chrystusa Króla
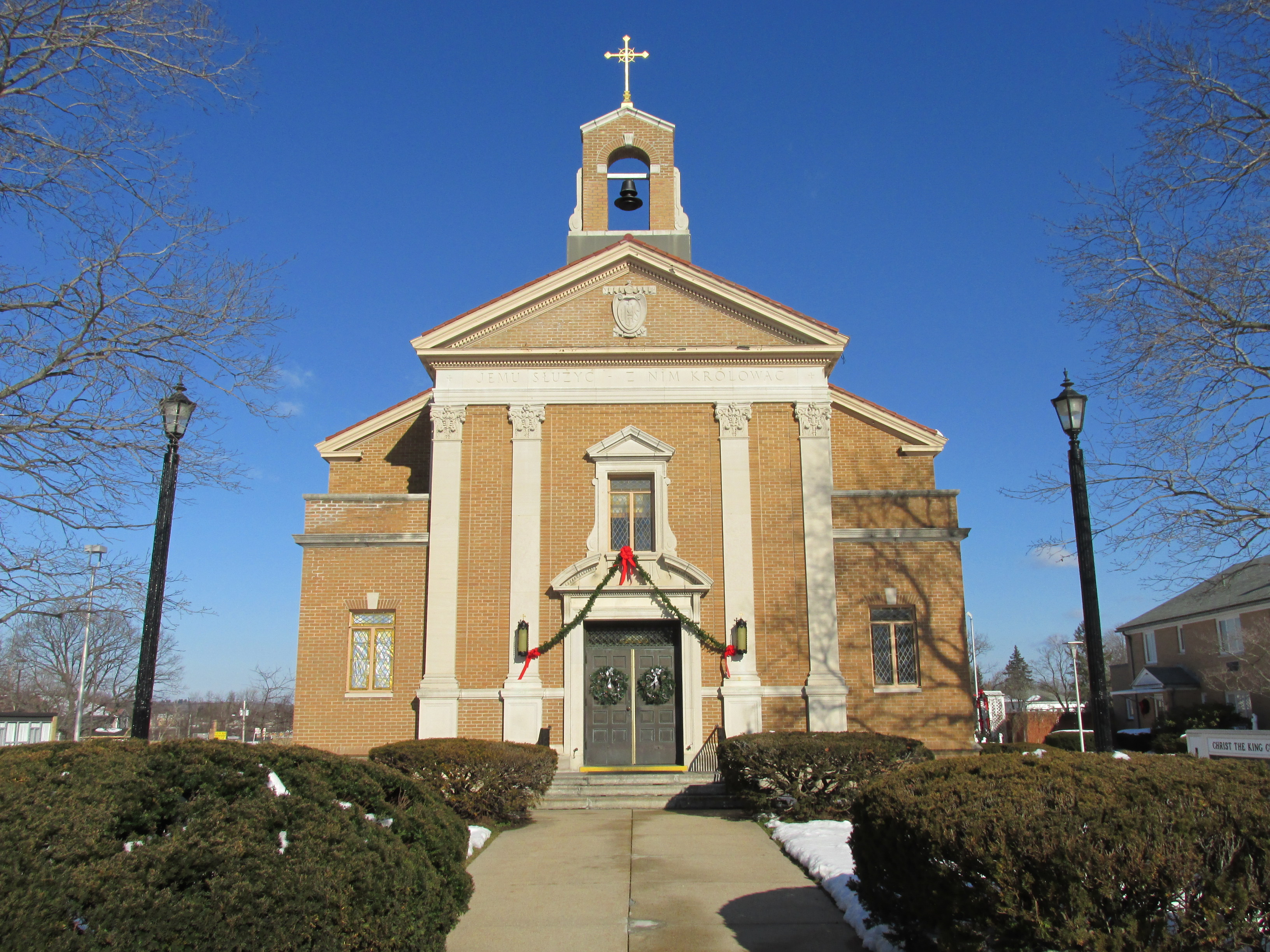
- Christ the King Church
- Christ the King Parish
- Location: 41 Warsaw Avenue; Ludlow, Massachusetts
- Country: United States
- Denomination: Roman Catholic

History
- Founded: 1948
- Founder: Polish immigrants
- Dedication: Christ the King

Administration
- Division: Region 6
- Archdiocese: Boston
- Diocese: Springfield in Massachusetts

Clergy
- Bishop: Most Rev. Mitchell T. Rozanski
- Pastor: Rev. Raymond A Soltys

Christ the King Parish is a Roman Catholic parish designated for Polish immigrants in Ludlow, Massachusetts, United States that was founded in 1948.

It is one of the Polish-American Roman Catholic parishes in New England in the Diocese of Springfield in Massachusetts. The architect of the 1940 church was Anthony J. DePace of New York who designed more than 30 buildings for catholic clients during the middle years of the 20th century.

== Mass Schedule ==
Sunday

- 7:30 AM
- 8:45 AM (Polish)
- 10:00 AM
- 11:15 AM
- 5:30 PM

Monday, Wednesday, Thursday & Friday

- 7:00 AM
- 7:30 AM

Tuesday

- 7:00 AM
- 6:00 PM (Miraculous Medal Novena Mass)

Saturday

- 7:00 AM
- 7:30 AM
- 5:00 PM (Sunday Vigil)
- 6:30 PM (Sunday Vigil)

== Bibliography ==
- The 150th Anniversary of Polish-American Pastoral Ministry. Webster, Massachusetts: St. Joseph Basilica. September 11, 2005.
- The Official Catholic Directory in USA
