= Our Lady of Ostrobrama Church (Brockton, Massachusetts) =

Our Lady of Ostrobrama Parish
- Our Lady of Ostrobrama Parish
- 42°06′4.5″N 71°01′17.6″W
- Location: 696 N Main St, Brockton, Massachusetts
- Country: United States
- Denomination: Roman Catholic

History
- Founded: 1914
- Founder: Polish Americans

Architecture
- Closed: December 31, 2001

Administration
- Archdeaconry: Archdiocese of Boston

Clergy
- Archbishop: Cardinal Seán Patrick O'Malley

Our Lady of Ostrobrama Parish is designated for Polish immigrants in Brockton, Massachusetts, United States.

It was one of the Polish-American Roman Catholic parishes in New England in the Archdiocese of Boston.

Founded in 1914, it was closed on December 31, 2001, as a part of plan of Archdiocese of Boston

== Bibliography ==
- Our Lady of Czestochowa Parish - Centennial 1893-1993
