= Our Lady of Perpetual Help Parish (New Bedford, Massachusetts) =

Coordinates: 41°39′23.4″N 70°55′32.1″W

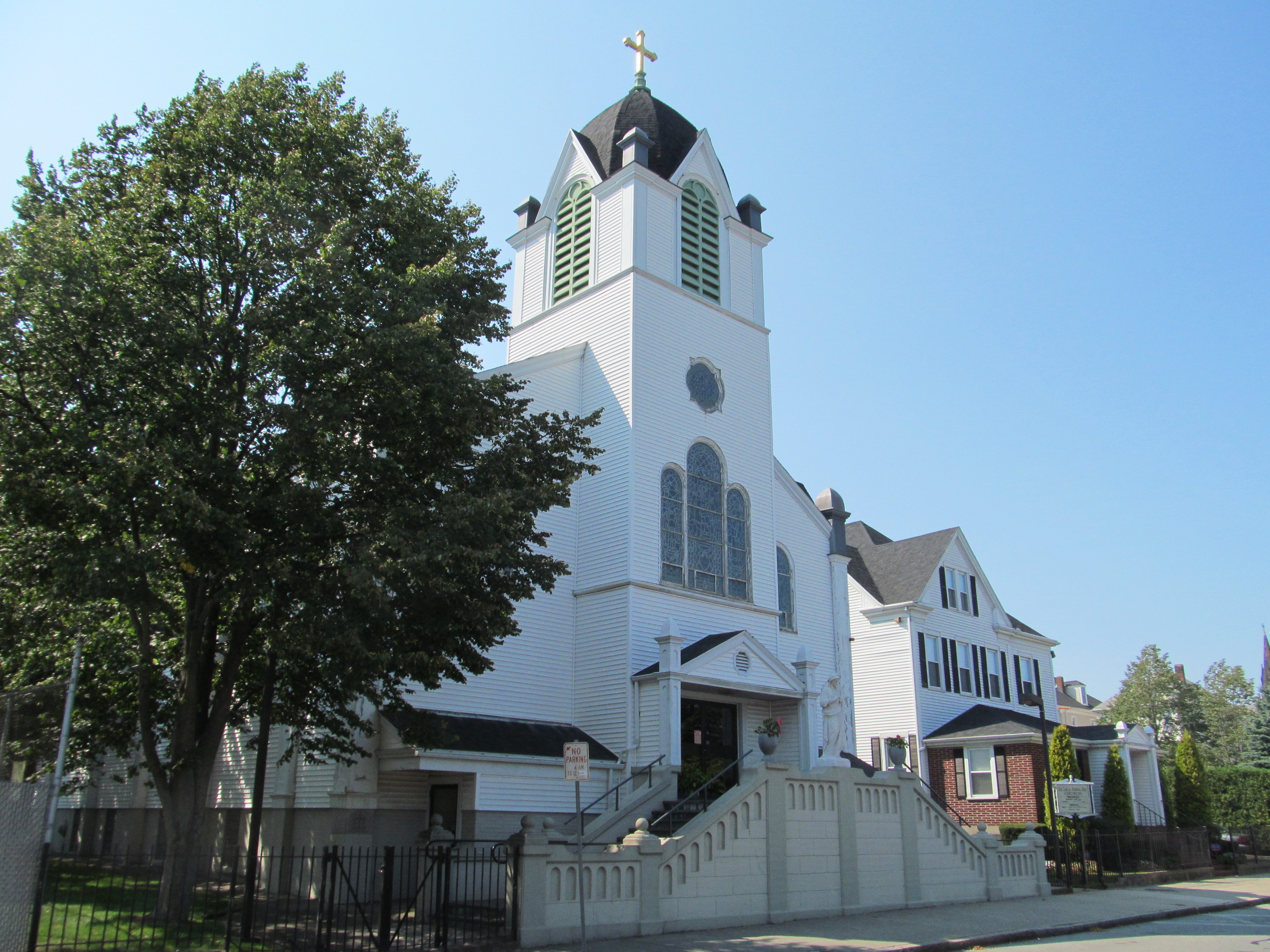
- Our Lady of Perpetual Help Parish
- Our Lady of Perpetual Help Parish
- Location: 235 North Front Street; New Bedford, Massachusetts
- Country: United States
- Denomination: Roman Catholic

History
- Founded: 1905
- Founder: Polish immigrants
- Dedication: Our Lady of Perpetual Help

Architecture
- Closed: Jan 20, 2022

Administration
- Province: Boston
- Diocese: Fall River

Our Lady of Perpetual Help Parish was a Roman Catholic parish designated for Polish immigrants in New Bedford, Massachusetts, United States.

Founded in 1905, Our Lady of Perptual Help was one of the Polish-American Roman Catholic parishes in New England in the Diocese of Fall River. Since the 1930s, the parish has been staffed by the Conventual Franciscans.

The parish was closed on January 20, 2022.

== Bibliography ==
- Our Lady of Czestochowa Parish - Centennial 1893-1993. Our Lady of Czestochowa, Boston. 1993.
- The Official Catholic Directory in USA
