= St. Stanislaus Parish, Fall River =

St. Stanislaus Parish
- St. Stanislaus Parish
- 41°41′29″N 71°10′8.8″W
- Location: 36 Rockland Street; Fall River, Massachusetts
- Country: United States
- Denomination: Roman Catholic
- Website: Parish website

History
- Founded: 1898
- Founder: Polish immigrants
- Dedication: St. Stanislaus

Administration
- Province: Boston
- Diocese: Fall River

Clergy
- Bishop: Most Rev. Edgar DaCunha
- Pastor: Very Rev. Thomas Washburn

St. Stanislaus Parish is a Roman Catholic parish designated for Polish immigrants in Fall River, Massachusetts, United States.

Founded in 1898, it is one of the Polish-American Roman Catholic parishes in New England in the Diocese of Fall River. It also has a vibrant community, annual Polish festival, and a school. The students are educated not only in their faith and regular studies, but also Polish culture and language.

The Church is in the South End Neighborhood in Fall River, known for its historic Slavic communities, an example being the Ukrainian Catholic Church, St. John the Baptist, down the street, and the famed restaurant, Pattie's Pierogi's close by. The community is steeped in tradition, and Polish or not, the parishioners, as well as the students in the school, are instilled with strong Polish ethnic and national pride.

== Bibliography ==
- Our Lady of Czestochowa Parish - Centennial 1893-1993. Our Lady of Czestochowa, Boston. 1993.
- The Official Catholic Directory in USA
