= St. Michael the Archangel Parish, Lynn =

St. Michael the Archangel Parish
- St. Michael the Archangel Parish
- 42°27′31″N 70°58′16″W
- Location: 567 Summer Street; Lynn, Massachusetts
- Country: United States
- Denomination: Roman Catholic

History
- Founded: 1906
- Founder: Polish immigrants
- Dedication: St. Michael the Archangel

Architecture
- Closed: June 25, 2006

Administration
- Division: Vicariate II
- District: North Pastoral Region
- Province: Boston
- Archdiocese: Boston

St. Michael the Archangel Parish was a parish of the Catholic Church in Lynn, Massachusetts in the United States. It was one of the Polish-American Roman Catholic parishes in New England in the Archdiocese of Boston, established in 1905 to serve Polish immigrants in the area. The parish was closed June 25, 2006.

== Bibliography ==
- Our Lady of Czestochowa Parish - Centennial 1893-1993
- The Official Catholic Directory in USA

== See also ==
- St. Michael’s parishioners gathered at shuttered church for solemn holy day in Lynn
