= Holy Family Parish, Pittsfield =

Coordinates: 42°27′23″N 73°15′12.8″W

Holy Family Parish
- Holy Family Parish
- Location: 133 Seymour Street; Pittsfield, Massachusetts
- Country: United States
- Denomination: Roman Catholic

History
- Founded: 1912
- Founder: Polish immigrants
- Dedication: Holy Family

Architecture
- Closed: 2008

Administration
- Division: Region 2
- Province: Boston
- Diocese: Springfield in Massachusetts

Holy Family Parish, designated for Polish immigrants in Pittsfield, Massachusetts, United States, was founded in 1912. It is one of the Polish-American Roman Catholic parishes in New England in the Diocese of Springfield in Massachusetts. The parish closed in 2008.

== History ==
In 1912 the Polish people of Pittsfield sent a special three man delegation to Bishop of Springfield, Thomas Bevan. The delegation (Joseph Ziemak, Joseph Zaorski and Stanley Pisiewski) requested for a Polish priest to be sent as a founder of a new Polish parish in Pittsfield.

Since the matter was resolved immediately and positively, a few months later Fr. Francis Wheeler, pastor of the Adams, Massachusetts, wrote a letter to the Bishop of Springfield on behalf of the delegation, stressing the need to establish a Polish parish in Pittsfield. In response to the petition and delegates, Bishop Fr. Kolodziej appointed Reverend Boleslaw Bojanowski, a Polish priest, to be pastor of the Polish community in Pittsfield. On January 18, 1913, Rev. Boleslaw Bojanowski arrived in Pittsfield, as the minister of all Poles in the city and its surroundings. Upon him was placed the obligation to organize the life of the Church, in its territory and create a new parish. In a short time arose a new Polish parish under the name of the Immaculate Conception of the Virgin Mary. Since then Poles have had their own devotion led by a Polish priest. Not having its own church, however, able to hear Mass at the St. Charles Church, courtesy of the local priest. Father Bojanowski performed the duties of pastor for three months, in his newly created parish of the Immaculate Conception in the chapel of St. Linden.

In 1921, the bishop sent Fr. Joseph Stanczyk as the new pastor. The new pastor inherited a particularly difficult situation. However, after some time, thanks to his goodness and simplicity, Fr. Stanczyk received the full support of his parishioners, who were very willing to work together for the benefit and development of the parish. The present chapel of St. Linden. was insufficient to meet the needs of growing populations and plans to build a new church began. Nearby a disused power generation station for the Pittsfield Electric Street Railway system was for sale. It had been closed on August 11, 1912, after only slightly more than 5 1/2 years of service. The new generation station on East Street made the Seymour Street plant surplus. After consulting with parishioners, Fr. Stanczyk purchased the building on Seymour Street for $8500. Parishioners willingly undertook the soliciting of funds to pay for acquiring the building and the costs of reconstruction and renovation into a church edifice. The cost of rebuilding, repair and equipment amounted to approximately $60,000. In 1924, Pittsfield witnessed the consecration of new church, which acquired a new name of the Holy Family Parish. The lower part of the building was converted into a school. Classes began in 1922 and were held three times a week.

== Pastors ==
- Rev. Bolesław Bojanowski (1912–1912)
- Rev. Victor Zarek (1912–1917)
- Rev. Waclaw Maleniewski (1917–1921)
- Rev. Józef Stanczyk (1921–1929)
- Rev. Walenty Teclaw (1929–1955)
- Rev. Ladislaus Rys (1955–1960)
- Rev. John Klekotka (1960–1969)
- Rev. Eugene Ozimek (1969–1977)
- Rev. Fredrick J Banas (1977-1995)

24781.tributes.com/show/Eugene-F.-Ozimek-79250451 Eugene Ozimek Obituary – Holyoke, Massachusetts – Henry-Dirsa Funeral Service]</ref>

== Bibliography ==
- The 150th Anniversary of Polish-American Pastoral Ministry. Webster, Massachusetts: St. Joseph Basilica. September 11, 2005.
- A short parish history the 1963 Jubilee Book. Holy Family Parish – Pittsfield MA: the internet Polish Genealogical Source.
- The Official Catholic Directory in USA
