= St. Anthony of Padua Parish, Chicopee =

St. Anthony of Padua Parish
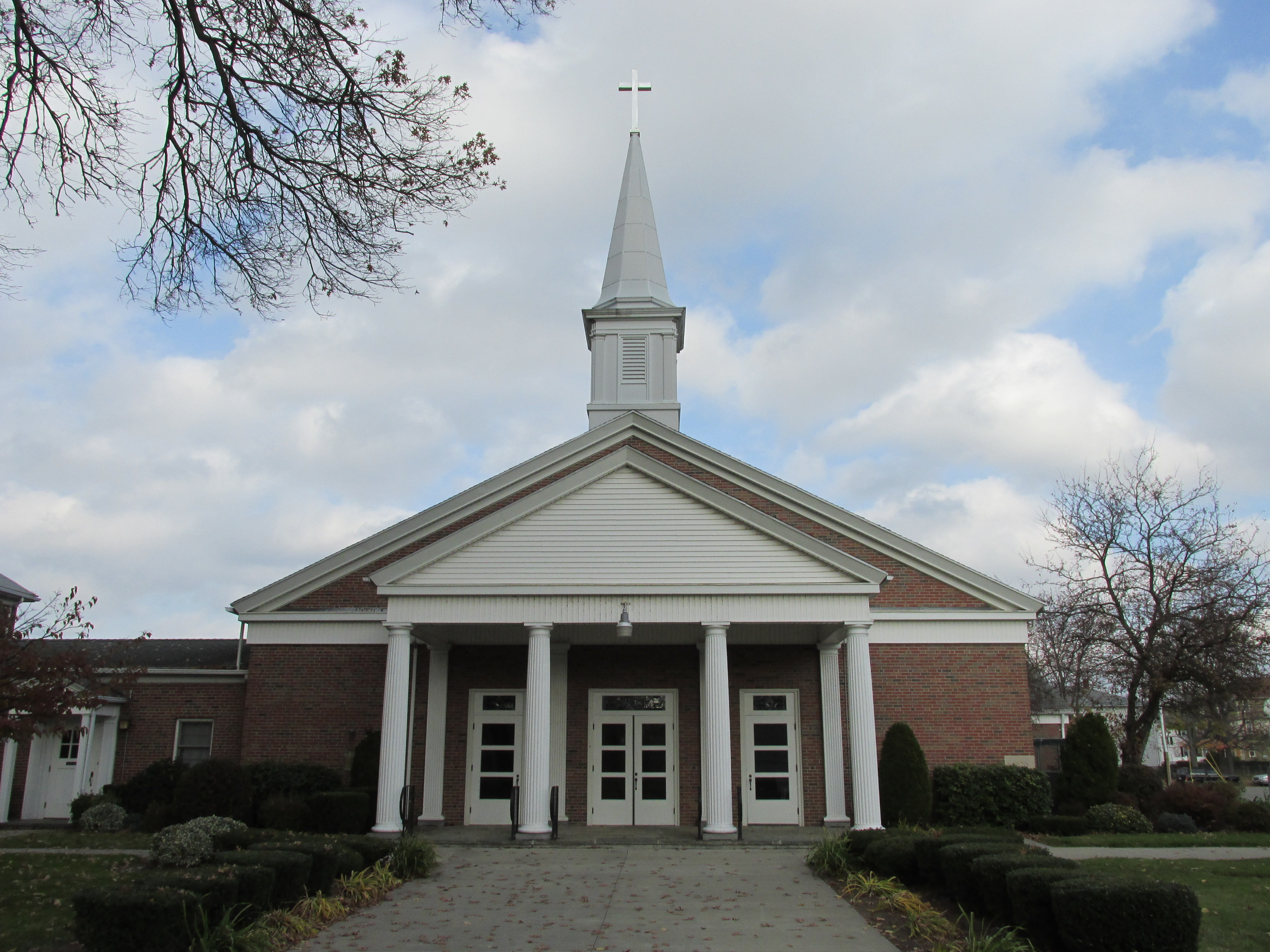
- St. Anthony of Padua Parish
- St. Anthony of Padua Parish
- 42°10′51.4″N 72°36′46.6″W
- Location: 56 Saint Anthony Street; Chicopee, Massachusetts
- Country: United States
- Denomination: Roman Catholic
- Website: Parish website

History
- Founded: 1926
- Founder: Polish immigrants
- Dedication: St. Anthony of Padua

Architecture
- Closed: Aug 29, 2009

Administration
- Division: Region 7
- Province: Boston
- Diocese: Springfield in Massachusetts

St. Anthony of Padua Parish is designated for Polish immigrants in Chicopee, Massachusetts, United States.

It was founded in 1926. It is one of the Polish-American Roman Catholic parishes in New England in the Diocese of Springfield in Massachusetts.

On August 29, 2009, it was announced by His Excellency Bishop Timothy McDonnell that the church of the Nativity of the Blessed Virgin Mary and St. Mary of the Assumption in the Willimansett section of Chicopee were to be merged with St. Anthony of Padua forming the new territorial parish for the Willimansett Section of Chicopee.

== Bibliography ==
- The 150th Anniversary of Polish-American Pastoral Ministry. Webster, Massachusetts: St. Joseph Basilica. September 11, 2005.
- Jendrysik, Stephen R. (2005). The Polish Community of Chicopee (MA). Charleston, SC: Arcadia Publishing. ISBN 0-7385-3892-2.
- The Official Catholic Directory in USA
- Herbermann, Charles, ed. (1913). "Springfield" . Catholic Encyclopedia. New York: Robert Appleton Company.
