= Immaculate Conception Parish, Indian Orchard =

Coordinates: 42°09′18.9″N 72°29′14″W

Immaculate Conception Parish
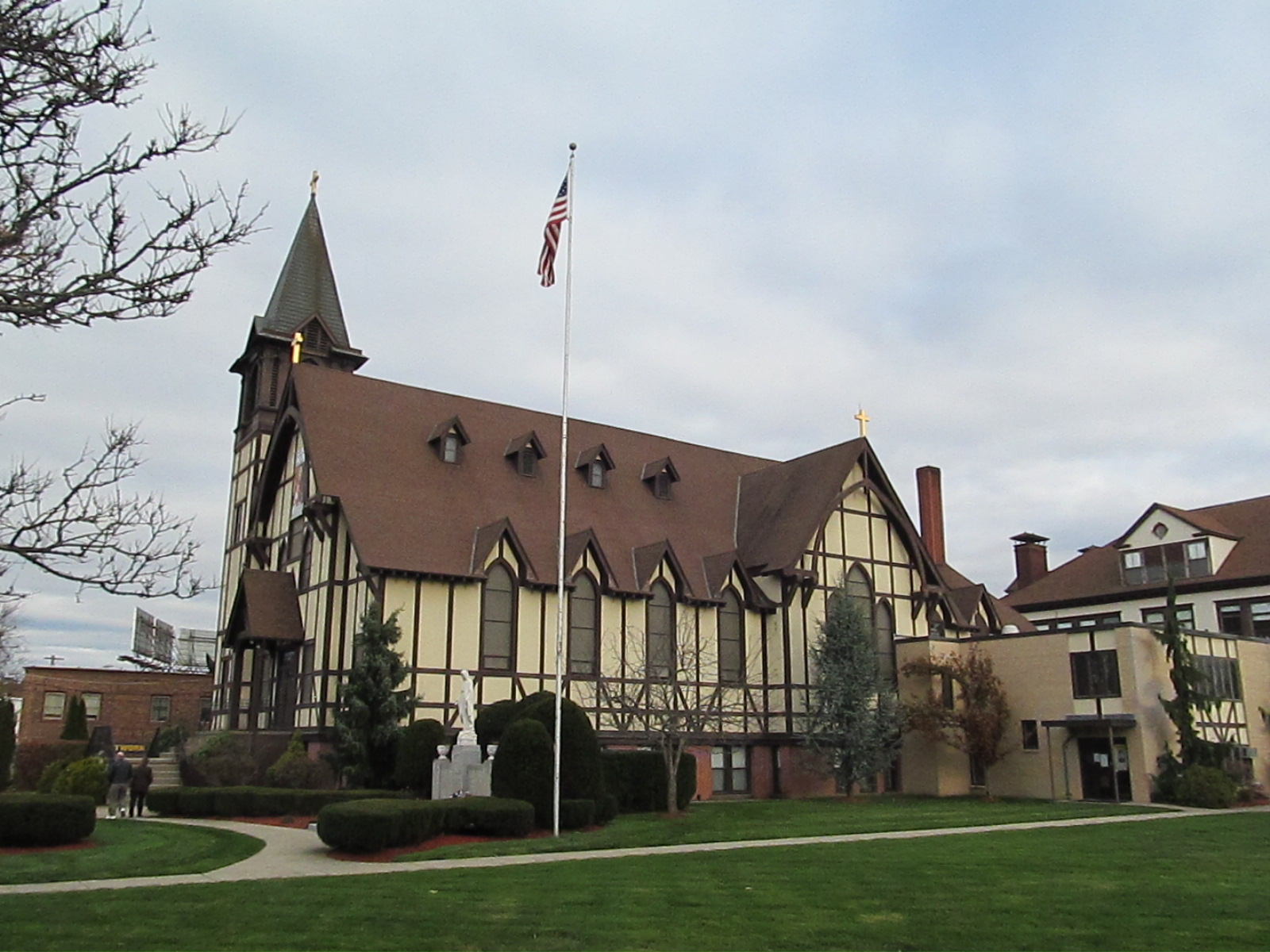
- Immaculate Conception Parish
- Immaculate Conception Parish
- Location: 25 Parker Street; Indian Orchard, Massachusetts
- Country: United States
- Denomination: Roman Catholic
- Website: Parish website

History
- Founded: 1904
- Founder: Polish immigrants
- Dedication: Immaculate Conception

Administration
- Division: Region 9
- Province: Boston
- Diocese: Springfield in Massachusetts

Clergy
- Bishop: Most Rev.William D.Byrne
- Pastor: Very Rev.Piotr S.Calik

Immaculate Conception Parish - Roman Catholic parish, designated for Polish immigrants in Indian Orchard, Massachusetts, United States.

Founded 1904. It is one of the Polish-American Roman Catholic parishes in New England in the Diocese of Springfield in Massachusetts.

Parish scheduled to close in 2009 but parish given an extension by the Bishop of Springfield to June 2010. The parish is seeking to become an Historical District to protect all the buildings. On September 18, 2010, it was announced that the bishop had accepted the parish's long-term plan and reconsidered his decision. Immaculate Conception will remain open.

== Bibliography ==
- The 150th Anniversary of Polish-American Pastoral Ministry. Webster, Massachusetts: St. Joseph Basilica. September 11, 2005.
- The Official Catholic Directory in USA
