= Holy Rosary Parish, Hadley =

Coordinates: 42°20′32″N 72°35′35.6″W

Holy Rosary Parish
- Holy Rosary Parish
- Location: 120 Russell Street; Hadley, Massachusetts
- Country: United States
- Denomination: Catholic

History
- Founded: 1916
- Founder: Polish immigrants
- Dedication: Holy Rosary

Architecture
- Closed: 1998

Administration
- Division: Region 5
- Province: Boston
- Diocese: Diocese of Springfield in Massachusetts

Holy Rosary Parish is designated for Polish immigrants in Hadley, Massachusetts, United States.

Founded in 1916, it is one of the Polish-American Roman Catholic parishes in New England in the Diocese of Springfield in Massachusetts.

In 1998, Holy Rosary Parish and St. John Parish were merged, to become Most Holy Redeemer Parish.

== Bibliography ==
- The 150th Anniversary of Polish-American Pastoral Ministry. Webster, Massachusetts: St. Joseph Basilica. September 11, 2005.
- Polish Jubilee Collection (MS 57). Special Collections and University Archives. University of Massachusetts Amherst: W.E.B. Du Bois Library.
- The Official Catholic Directory in USA
