= St. Stanislaus Parish, West Warren =

Coordinates: 42°12′44.1″N 72°14′21.6″W

St. Stanislaus Parish
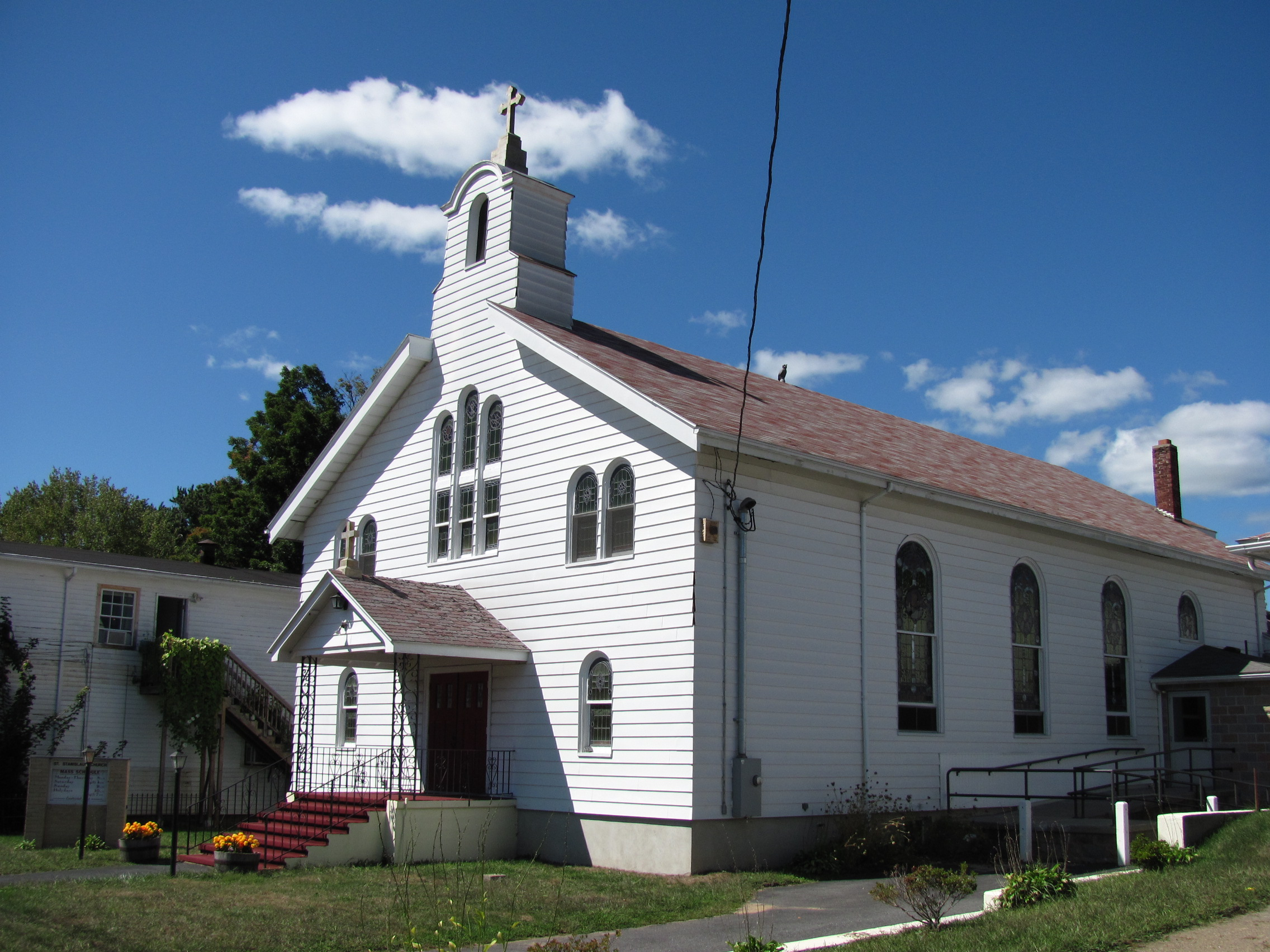
- St. Stanislaus Parish
- St. Stanislaus Parish
- Location: 2270 Main Street; West Warren, Massachusetts
- Country: United States
- Denomination: Roman Catholic

History
- Founded: 1908
- Founder: Polish immigrants
- Dedication: St. Stanislaus

Administration
- Division: Cluster 35
- Province: Boston
- Diocese: Worcester

Clergy
- Bishop: Most Rev. Robert Joseph McManus
- Pastor: Rev. John M Lizewski

St. Stanislaus Parish - designated for Polish immigrants in West Warren, Massachusetts, United States.

Founded December 1908. It is one of the Polish-American Roman Catholic parishes in New England in the Diocese of Worcester.

== Bibliography ==
- A short parish history the 1963 Jubilee Book. St. Stanislaus B & M Parish - West Warren MA: the internet Polish Genealogical Source.
- Our Lady of Czestochowa Parish – Celebrating our Hundredth Anniversary 1903-2003. Worcester, Massachusetts. 2003.
- Our Lady of Czestochowa Parish - Centennial 1893-1993. Our Lady of Czestochowa, Boston. 1993.
- The Official Catholic Directory in USA
