= St. Michael the Archangel Parish, Haverhill =

St. Michael the Archangel Parish
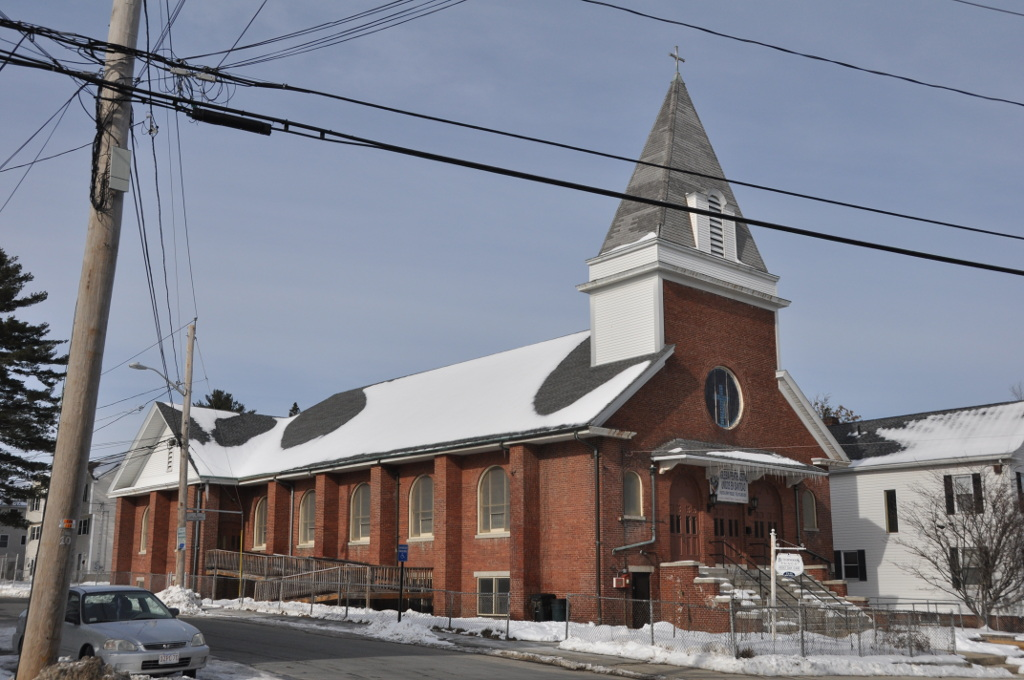
- St. Michael the Archangel Parish
- 42°46′26.6″N 71°05′28″W
- Location: 71 High Street; Haverhill, Massachusetts
- Country: United States
- Denomination: Roman Catholic

History
- Founded: January 13, 1901
- Founder: Polish immigrants
- Dedication: St. Michael the Archangel

Architecture
- Closed: August 29, 1998

Administration
- Division: Vicariate II
- District: Merrimack Pastoral Region
- Province: Boston
- Archdiocese: Boston

St. Michael the Archangel Parish - designated for Polish immigrants in Haverhill, Massachusetts, United States.

It was founded on January 13, 1901. It was one of the Polish-American Roman Catholic parishes in New England in the Archdiocese of Boston.

The parish was closed on August 29, 1998.

== Bibliography ==
- A short parish history the 1960 Jubilee Book. St. Michael Parish - Haverhill MA: the internet Polish Genealogical Source.
- Our Lady of Czestochowa Parish - Centennial 1893-1993
- The Official Catholic Directory in USA
