= St. Joseph Parish, Suffield =

Coordinates: 41°58′39″N 72°39′7.3″W

St. Joseph Parish
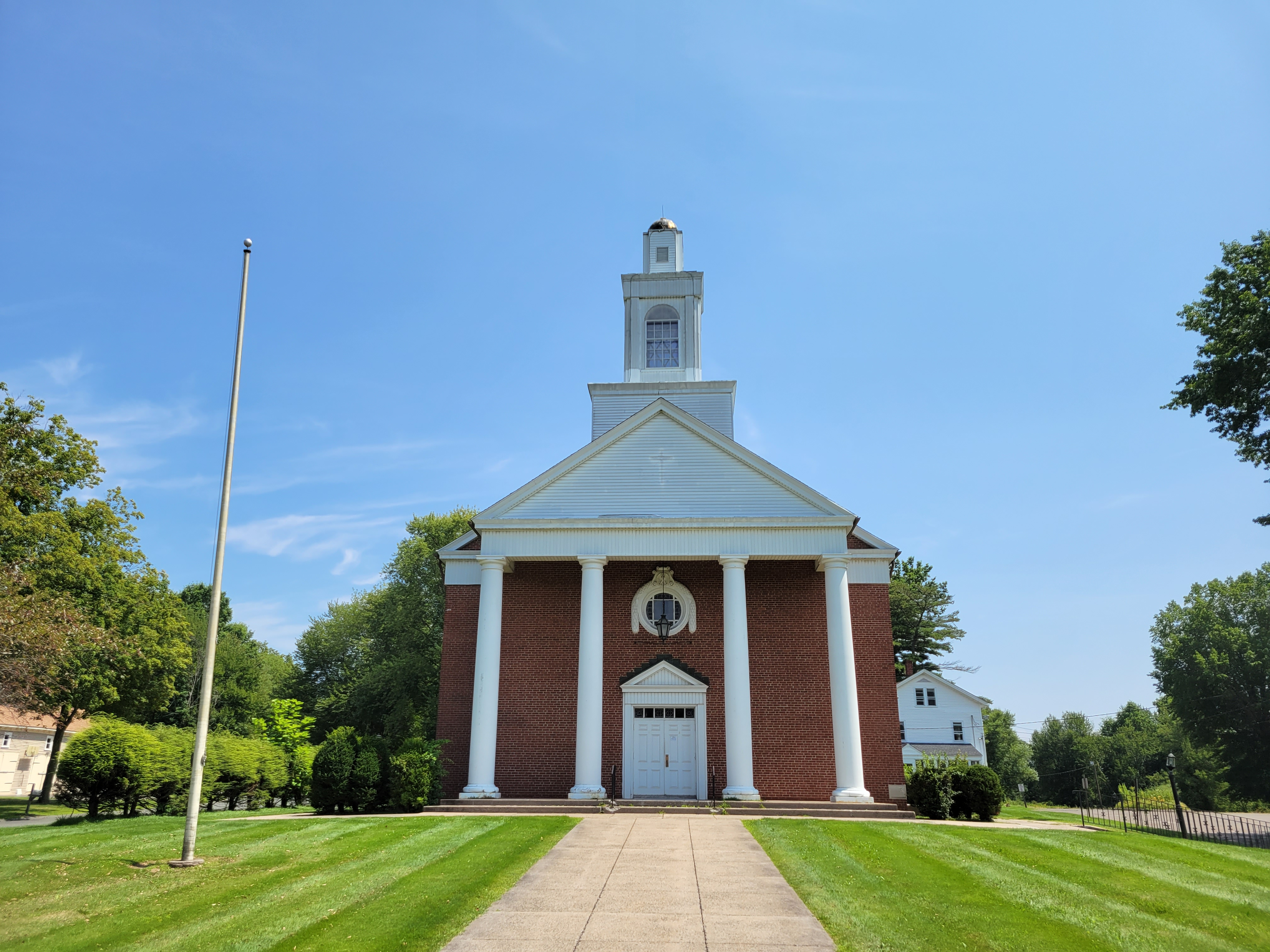
- St Joseph's Church
- St. Joseph Parish
- Location: 140 South Main Street; Suffield, Connecticut
- Country: United States
- Denomination: Roman Catholic

History
- Founded: March 12, 1916
- Founder: Polish immigrants
- Dedication: St. Joseph

Administration
- Division: Vicariate: Hartford
- Province: Hartford
- Archdiocese: Hartford

Clergy
- Archbishop: Most Rev. Christopher J. Coyne

St. Joseph Parish is a parish designated for Polish immigrants in Suffield, Connecticut, United States. It was founded on March 12, 1916. It is one of the Polish-American Roman Catholic parishes in New England in the Archdiocese of Hartford.

== History ==
On March 12, 1916, Bishop John Joseph Nilan appointed Fr. Francis Wladasz as founding pastor of the newly created St. Joseph Parish. The new pastor celebrated the first parochial Mass on Easter Sunday of 1916 in the Edwin D. Morgan stable, purchased earlier by the St. Joseph Society and converted into a church.

On November 9, 1952, Bishop Henry J. O'Brien dedicated modern St. Joseph Church with a Georgian style brick edifice.

In 2017 St. Joseph Parish was merged with Sacred Heart Parish and closed for regular worship. The building has now been relegated to profane but not sordid use. It was recently shown as "for lease."

== Bibliography ==
- The 150th Anniversary of Polish-American Pastoral Ministry. Webster, Massachusetts: St. Joseph Basilica. September 11, 2005.
- The Official Catholic Directory in USA
