= St. Stanislaus Kostka Church (Adams, Massachusetts) =

Coordinates: 42°37′29.8″N 73°06′53″W

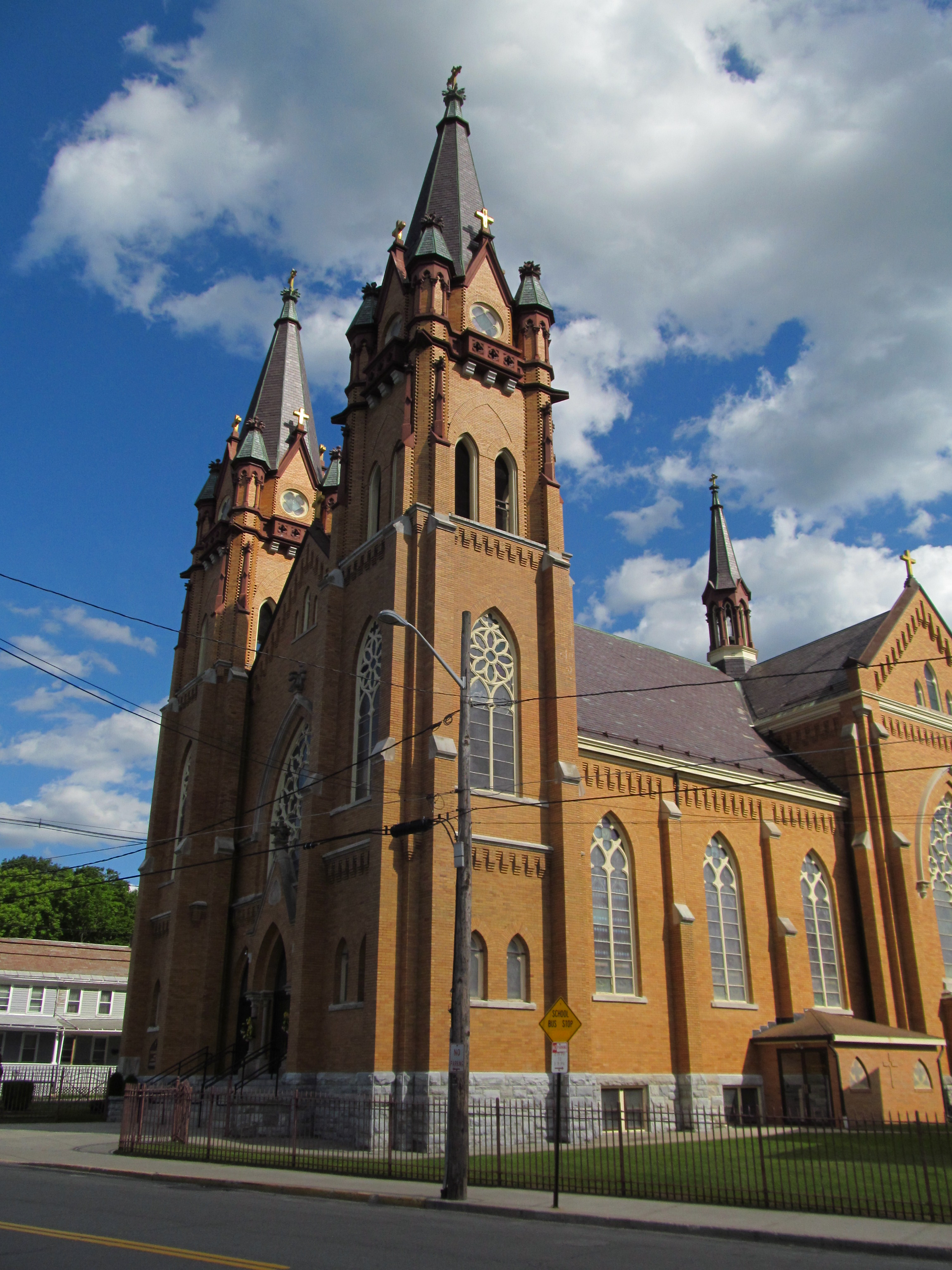
- St. Stanislaus Kostka Church
- St. Stanislaus Kostka Church
- Location: 25 Hoosac Street; Adams, Massachusetts
- Country: United States
- Denomination: Roman Catholic
- Website: http://www.adamscatholicchurches.org/

History
- Status: Church
- Founded: 1902; April 1, 2012
- Founder: Polish immigrants
- Dedication: St. Stanislaus
- Consecrated: 1902

Architecture
- Functional status: Active (as of April 1, 2012)
- Closed: January 1, 2009

Administration
- Division: Region 1
- Province: Boston
- Diocese: Springfield in Massachusetts
- Parish: Pope St. John Paul II Parish

Clergy
- Bishop: William Draper Byrne
- Pastor: Rev. Steven G. Montesanti

St. Stanislaus Kostka Church is a Catholic mission church designated for Polish immigrants in Adams, Massachusetts.

Founded in December 1902, it is one of the Polish-American Catholic parishes in New England in the Diocese of Springfield in Massachusetts. On January 1, 2009, was temporarily closed by Bishop Timothy A. McDonnell. After 1,150 days of parishioners sitting in vigil, it was announced on February 18, 2012, that the church would reopen on Palm Sunday (April 1) 2012.

The church offers Sunday Mass, all Holy Days of Obligation, weddings, funerals, and baptisms. It now serves as a mission church of St. John Paul II Parish in Adams.

== School ==
- St. Stanislaus Kostka School, Adams, MA (Grades: PK - 8)

== Bibliography ==
- The 150th Anniversary of Polish-American Pastoral Ministry. Webster, Massachusetts: St. Joseph Basilica. September 11, 2005.
- Our Lady of Czestochowa Parish - Centennial 1893-1993. Our Lady of Czestochowa, Boston. 1993.
- The Official Catholic Directory in USA
- Herbermann, Charles, ed. (1913). "Springfield" . Catholic Encyclopedia. New York: Robert Appleton Company.

== See also ==
- Keeping Faith St. Stanislaus Kostka Fights Closing
- Diocese Drops the Hammer in Adams, N. Adams
