= St. Joseph Parish, Claremont =

St. Joseph Parish
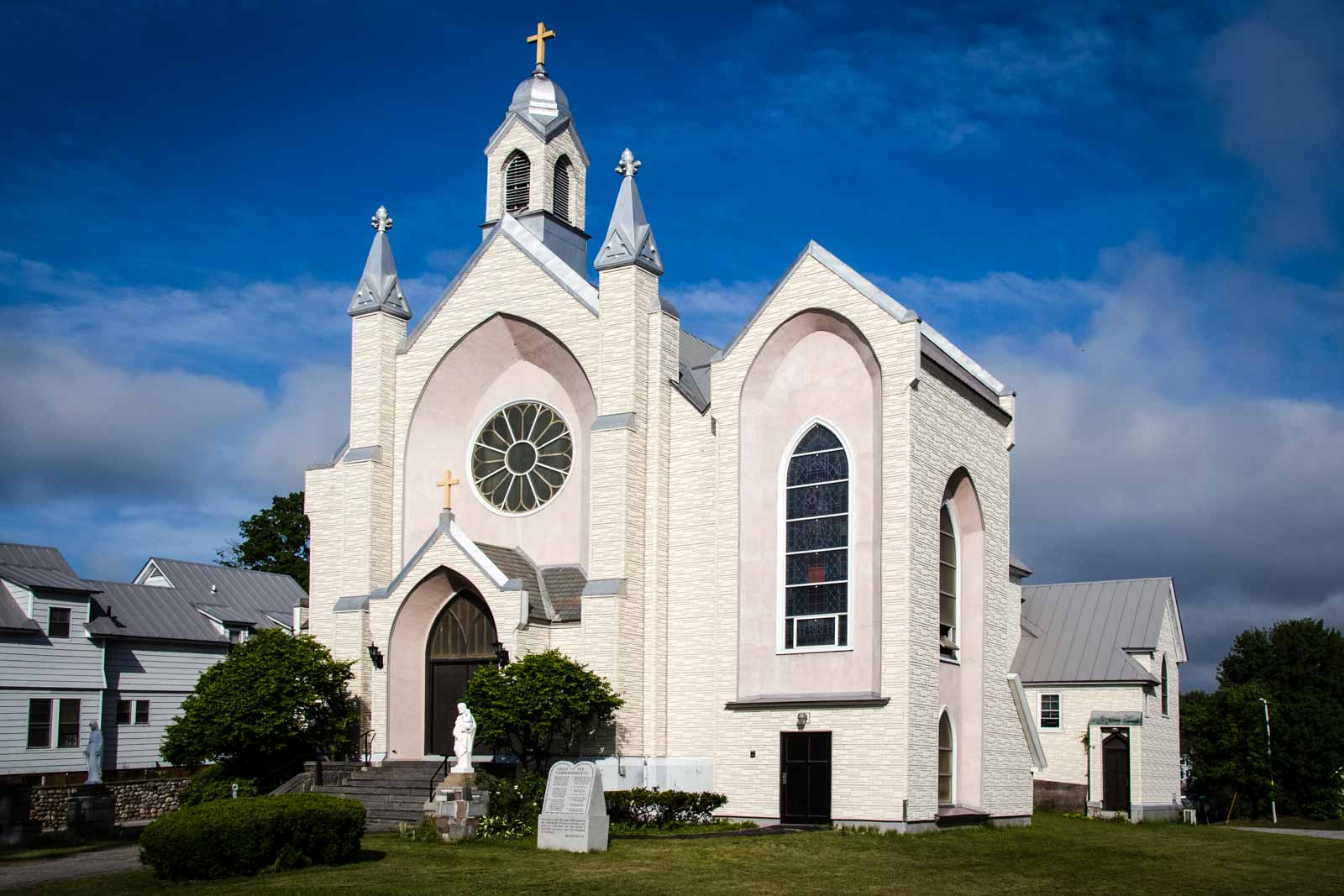
- St. Joseph Parish
- 43°22′41.8″N 72°20′42.4″W
- Location: 58 Elm Street; Claremont, New Hampshire
- Country: United States
- Denomination: Roman Catholic

History
- Founded: 1922
- Dedication: St. Joseph

Administration
- District: Upper Valley
- Province: Boston
- Diocese: Manchester

Clergy
- Bishop: Most Rev. Peter Anthony Libasci
- Pastor: Rev. Sebastian Susairaj H.G.N.

St. Joseph Parish was originally built to serve Polish immigrants in Claremont, New Hampshire, United States. It was founded in 1922, it is one of the Polish-American Roman Catholic parishes in New England in the Diocese of Manchester.

== Bibliography ==
- The 150th Anniversary of Polish-American Pastoral Ministry. Webster, Massachusetts: St. Joseph Basilica. September 11, 2005.
- The Official Catholic Directory in USA
