= St. Stanislaus Kostka Parish, Woonsocket =

Coordinates: 42°00′24.7″N 71°31′16″W

St. Stanislaus Kostka Parish
- St. Stanislaus Kostka Parish
- Location: 174 Harris Avenue; Woonsocket, Rhode Island
- Country: United States
- Denomination: Roman Catholic
- Website: www.ststanswoonsocket.com

History
- Founded: 1905
- Founder: Polish immigrants
- Dedication: St. Stanislaus Kostka

Administration
- Province: Hartford
- Diocese: Providence

Clergy
- Bishop(s): Most Rev. Thomas J. Tobin, D.D.
- Pastor: Rev. Dariusz J. Jonczyk

St. Stanislaus Kostka Parish is a Roman Catholic parish located in Woonsocket, Rhode Island. It is known for its Polish-American community, various community events, and young parishioner base. During the year, dances, bazaars, flea markets, and other events are hosted at the parish center, which is located in the church's parking lot.

== Description ==
It was founded in 1905. It is one of the Polish-American Roman Catholic parishes in New England in the Diocese of Providence.

== See also ==
- Catholic Church in the United States
- Catholic parish church
- Index of Catholic Church articles
- Pastoral care

== Bibliography ==
- Kruszka, Waclaw (1998). A History of the Poles in America to 1908; Part III: Poles in the Eastern and Southern States. Washington, D.C.: The Catholic University of America Press.
- The 150th Anniversary of Polish-American Pastoral Ministry. Webster, Massachusetts: St. Joseph Basilica. September 11, 2005.
- The Official Catholic Directory in USA
