= Sacred Heart Parish, Ipswich =

Sacred Heart Parish
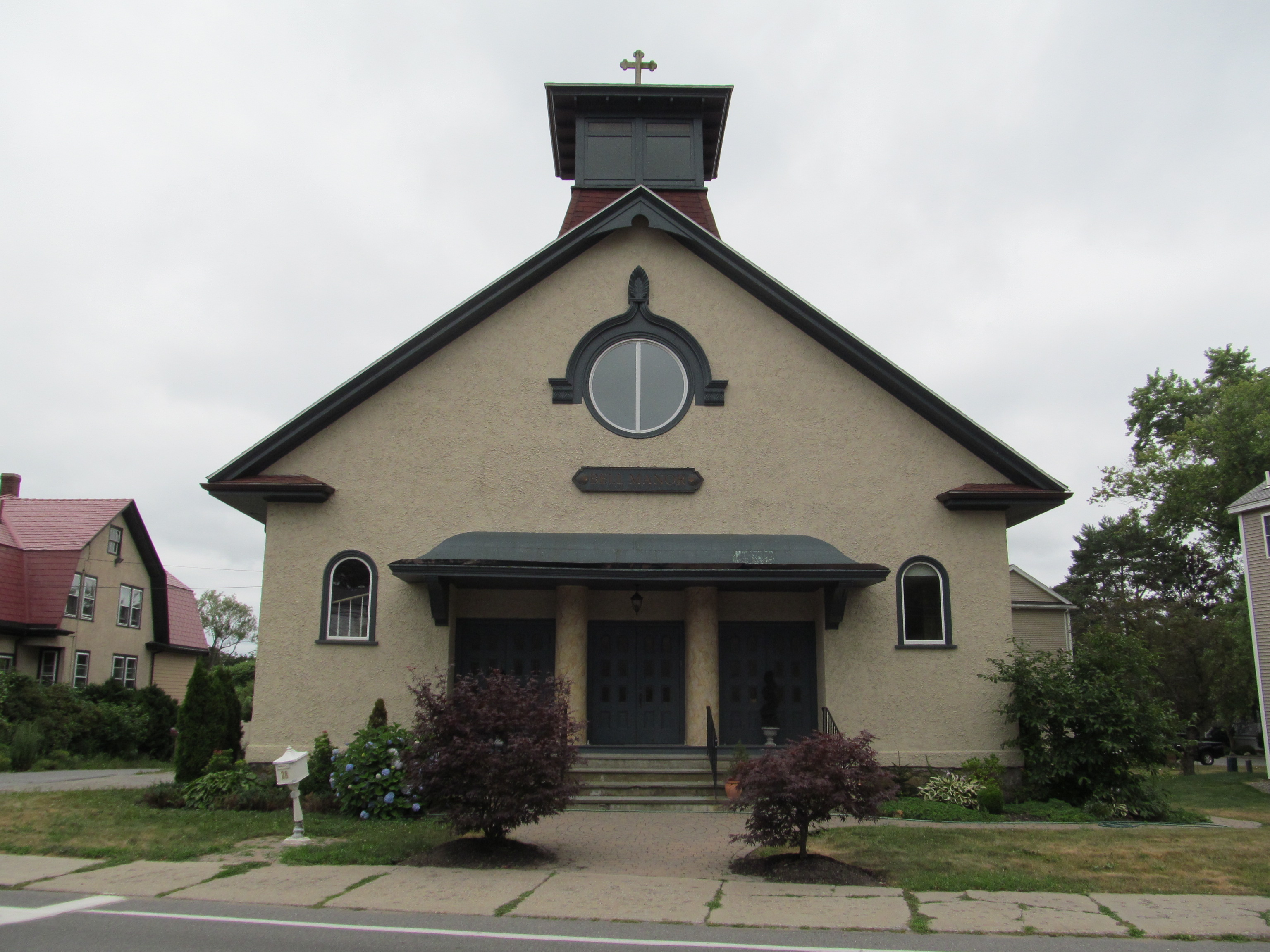
- Sacred Heart Parish
- Sacred Heart Parish
- 42°40′32″N 70°50′39″W
- Location: 28 Topsfield Road; Ipswich, Massachusetts
- Country: United States
- Denomination: Roman Catholic

History
- Founded: 1908
- Founder: Polish immigrants
- Dedication: Sacred Heart

Architecture
- Closed: April 25, 1999

Administration
- Division: Vicariate IV
- District: Merrimack Pastoral Region
- Province: Boston
- Archdiocese: Boston

Sacred Heart Parish was designated for Polish immigrants in Ipswich, Massachusetts, United States.

It was founded 1908. It was one of the Polish-American Roman Catholic parishes in New England in the Archdiocese of Boston.

The parish closed April 25, 1999. The building retains the original structure, but the interior has been converted into luxury apartments.

== Bibliography ==
- Our Lady of Czestochowa Parish - Centennial 1893-1993
- The Official Catholic Directory in USA

== See also ==
- "Parishioners plead for Polish church". The Boston Globe. Boston, MA. February 21, 1997. Archived from the original on November 2, 2012 – via HighBeam Research.
- "Ipswich faithful bid adieu to church". The Boston Herald. April 25, 1999. Archived from the original on November 2, 2012 – via HighBeam Research.
