= St. Mary Parish, Ware =

Coordinates: 42°15′22.7″N 72°14′26.7″W

St. Mary's Church
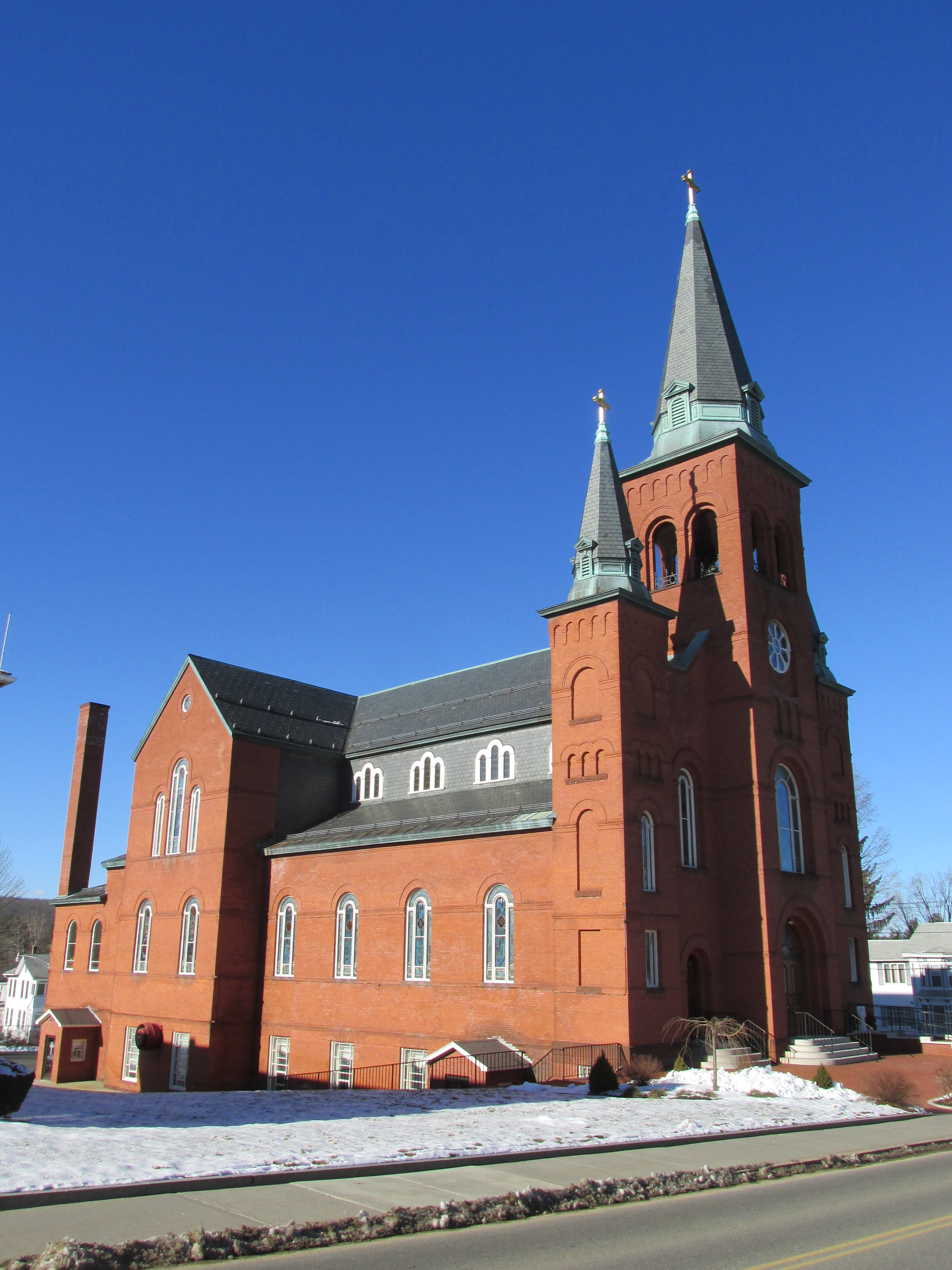
- St. Mary's Church in 2013

- Location of St. Mary Parish
- Location: 60 South St. Ware, MA 01082
- Country: United States
- Denomination: Roman Catholic
- Website: http://www.stmarysware.org/

History
- Founded: 1905
- Founder: Polish immigrants
- Dedication: St. Mary

Administration
- Division: Region 8
- Province: Boston
- Diocese: Springfield in Massachusetts

Clergy
- Bishop: Most Rev. William Draper Byrne
- Pastor: Rev. Piotr S. Calik

St. Mary Parish - designated for Polish immigrants in Ware, Massachusetts, United States.

Founded 1905, it is one of the Polish-American Roman Catholic parishes in New England in the Diocese of Springfield in Massachusetts.

== History ==
On December 22, 1904, there came to this settlement two missionary Fathers. Fr. Joseph Fux M.S. and Fr. Oswald Loretan M.S. Then Fr. Joseph Fux M.S. was named the first pastor of the local parish.

The first religious service for the Poles was conducted on January 1, 1905, in the lower part of All Saints Church. The first collection for this purpose netted $300, the second campaign brought in $2,000 for the new structure. In 1907, the church structure, built in the Romano-Gothic style, was completed.

In 1923 there were three large bells purchased and installed in the central tower. In the same year the lower church was remodeled and made into eight class rooms.

The Polish immigrants of Ware at present number about 2700 people, for the most part, came from the Southern part of Poland, from the counties of Dabrowa, Tarnow, Rzeszow and Jaslo.

== Pastors ==
- Fr. Joseph Fux M.S. (1904–1913)
- Fr. Oswald Loretan M.S. (1913–1926)
- Fr. Joseph Piszczalka M.S. (1926–1927)
- Fr. Michael Kolbuch M.S. (1927–?)
- Fr. Walentin Kustosz (?–1981)
- Fr. Charles Kuzmeski (? – 2005)
- Fr. Jeffrey A Ballou (2005–2019)
- Fr. Piotr S. Calik (2019–current)

== Bibliography ==
- A short parish history the 1930 Jubilee Book. St. Mary Parish - Ware MA: the internet Polish Genealogical Source.
- The 150th Anniversary of Polish-American Pastoral Ministry. Webster, Massachusetts: St. Joseph Basilica. September 11, 2005.
- The Official Catholic Directory in USA
