= Sacred Heart of Jesus Parish, Danbury =

Coordinates: 41°23′32.7″N 73°26′35″W

Sacred Heart of Jesus Parish
- Sacred Heart of Jesus Parish
- Location: 12 Cottage Street; Danbury, Connecticut
- Country: United States
- Denomination: Roman Catholic
- Website: http://www.sacredheartdanbury.org/

History
- Founded: 1925
- Founder: Polish immigrants
- Dedication: Sacred Heart of Jesus
- Dedicated: April 8, 1926

Administration
- Province: Hartford
- Diocese: Bridgeport
- Parish: Bridgeport

Clergy
- Bishop: Most Rev. Frank Joseph Caggiano
- Pastor: Fr. Norm Guilbert

Sacred Heart of Jesus Parish - designated for Polish immigrants in Danbury, Connecticut, United States.

Founded in 1925. It is one of the Polish-American Roman Catholic parishes in New England in the Diocese of Bridgeport.

== History ==
In 1924, Polish immigrants obtained permission from the Bishop of Hartford Michael Tierney to organize a church for the Polish community. The first Masses were held in the basement of the Danbury Town Hall. In the spring of 1925 the property where the church now stands was purchased for one dollar and other valuable considerations. Within four months over $20,000 was collected, and construction of the new church began almost immediately, and on October 18, 1925, 2,000 people witnessed the laying of the cornerstone. On April 8, 1926 the dedication of the church was celebrated.

== Departure of Conventual Franciscan Friars ==
In June 2014, it was announced by Bishop Caggiano, Father James McCurry (Friar Provincial) and Father Dennis Mason (Pastor of Sacred Heart) that after nearly 90 years of service, the Conventual Franciscan Friars would depart Sacred Heart of Jesus Parish as part of the province's restructuring of their ministries. A mass of thanksgiving was held on August 26, 2014 to celebrate their service to the parish. In attendance were Bishop Caggiano, Father McCurry, Father Dennis Mason, Father Mark Curesky (an area native), and former WCSU chaplains and Sacred Heart Friary residents Fr. Brad Heckathorne and Fr. Michael Lasky. Fr. Leonel Medeiros assumed the role of Pastor at Sacred Heart, following Father Dennis Mason's departure. Fr. Medeiros is the first diocesan Pastor in the history of Sacred Heart Parish.

== Bibliography ==
- The 150th Anniversary of Polish-American Pastoral Ministry. Webster, Massachusetts: St. Joseph Basilica. September 11, 2005.
- Kruszka, Waclaw (1998). A History of the Poles in America to 1908. Washington, D.C.: The Catholic University of America Press - Part III: Poles in the Eastern and Southern States.
- The Official Catholic Directory in USA
