= St. John the Baptist Parish (Salem, Massachusetts) =

- St. John the Baptist Parish
- 42°31′27.8″N 70°53′37.0″W
- Location: 28 Street Peter Street; Salem, Massachusetts
- Country: United States
- Denomination: Roman Catholic
- Website: https://www.jpiidivinemercyshrine.org/

History
- Founded: 1903
- Founder: Polish immigrants
- Dedication: St. John the Baptist

Administration
- Division: North Pastoral Region
- Province: Boston
- Archdiocese: Boston

Clergy
- Archbishop: Cardinal Seán Patrick O'Malley
- Pastor(s): Rev. Jacek Walkiewicz, S.Ch.

The Parish of Saint John the Baptist is a parish of the Catholic Church in Salem, Massachusetts, within the Archdiocese of Boston. It was founded in 1903 to serve Polish immigrants in the area.

Originally, Mass was celebrated at Immaculate Conception Parish in Salem, but as Polish immigration to Salem grew, their own church was needed. The first church was erected on Hebert Street, along with a school building. Years later, the parish bought the recently closed Baptist church on St. Peter Street and renovated it, which included adding a second floor. The parish added a large parking lot and opened a school in the 1960s, but the school closed in the early 1970s due to low enrollment.

Facing demographic changes and a shortage of priests, the Archdiocese implemented programs in the early 2000s to combine parishes together under a single pastor. In 2013, it joined with three other Catholic parishes in Salem, St. James, Immaculate Conception, and St. Anne to form the Salem Catholic Collaborative (St. Anne's would leave the collaborative a year later). Rev. Daniel J. Riley was appointed pastor, the first non-Polish pastor in St. John the Baptist's history.

In October 2016, it was announced that Fr. Riley would be leaving the collaborative. Along with his departure, most of the staff was fired and the school building was closed for use, shutting down the bingo that help fund the parish for the last 43 years. In 2017, Fr. Robert Bedzinski, S.Ch. arrived to become the new parish priest.

St. John the Baptist is one of the few remaining Polish-American Roman Catholic parishes in New England in the Archdiocese of Boston. Masses are celebrated daily (except for Tuesdays) at 8:00 AM, and Saturday evening at 4:00 PM. Sunday mass is at 10:00 AM in Polish and 12:00 PM in English. There is also a novena to St. Jude Monday nights at 7 PM.

== Bibliography ==
- Our Lady of Czestochowa Parish - Centennial 1893-1993
- The Official Catholic Directory in USA
- 75th Anniversary Book for St. John The Baptist Parish (1978)
