= Our Lady of the Holy Rosary Parish, Taunton =

Coordinates: 41°54′52.4″N 71°05′37″W

Our Lady of the Holy Rosary Parish
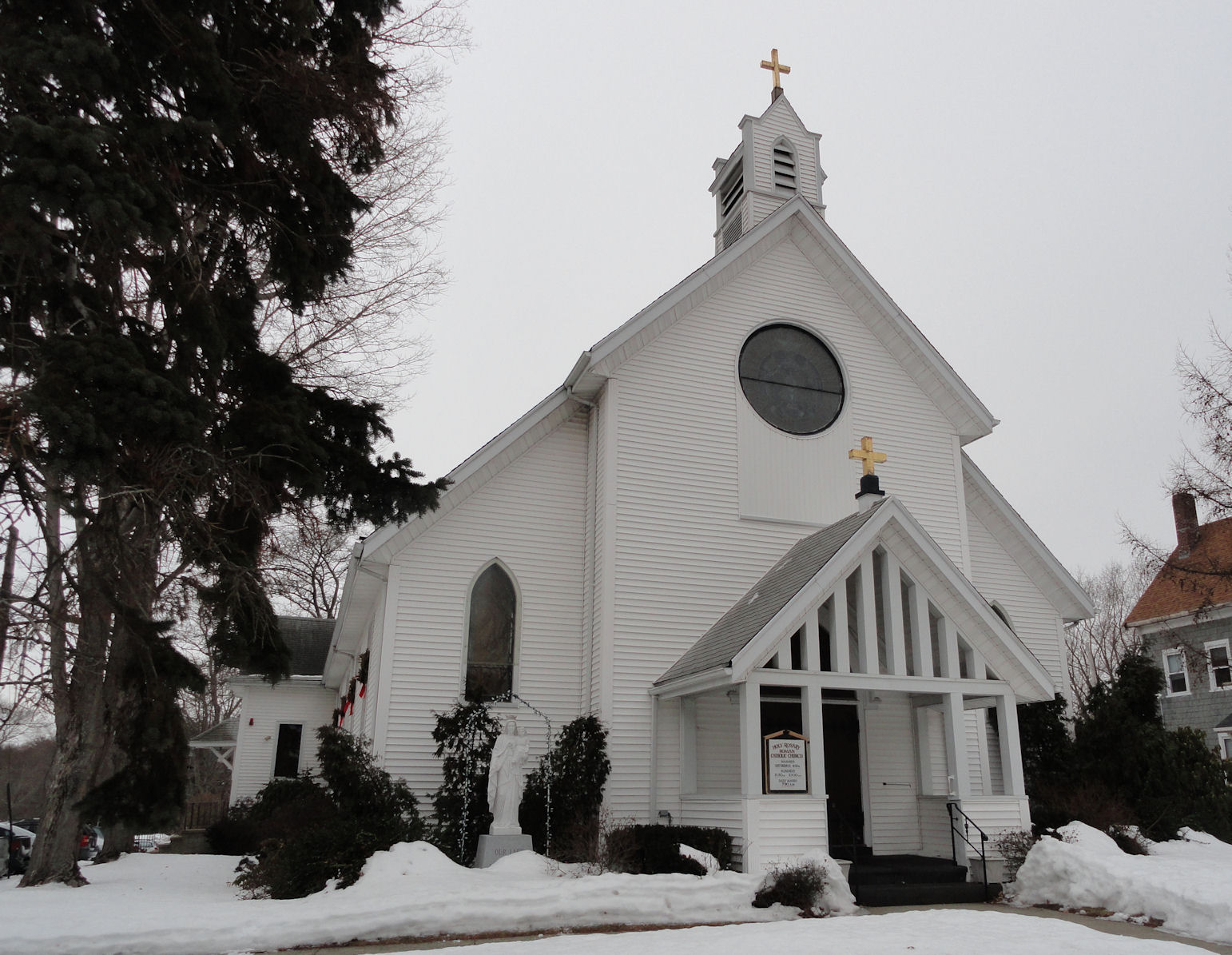
- Our Lady of the Holy Rosary Church
- Our Lady of the Holy Rosary Parish
- Location: Taunton, Massachusetts
- Country: United States
- Denomination: Roman Catholic
- Website: Parish website

History
- Founded: 1909
- Founder: Polish immigrants
- Dedication: Our Lady of the Holy Rosary

Administration
- Province: Boston
- Diocese: Fall River

Our Lady of the Holy Rosary Parish is a parish of the Roman Catholic church designated for Polish immigrants in Taunton, Massachusetts, United States.

It was founded in 1927 in the Diocese of Fall River as one of the Polish-American Roman Catholic parishes in New England.

== Bibliography ==
- Our Lady of Czestochowa Parish - Centennial 1893-1993. Our Lady of Czestochowa, Boston. 1993.
- The Official Catholic Directory in USA
