= Our Lady of Jasna Gora Parish, Clinton =

Coordinates: 42°24′47″N 71°41′10.4″W

Our Lady of Jasna Gora Parish
- Our Lady of Jasna Gora Parish
- Location: 128 Franklin Street; Clinton, Massachusetts
- Country: United States
- Denomination: Roman Catholic
- Website: Parish website

History
- Founded: 1913
- Founder: Polish immigrants
- Dedication: Our Lady of Jasna Gora

Architecture
- Closed: 2010

Administration
- Division: Cluster 11
- Province: Boston
- Diocese: Worcester

Our Lady of Jasna Gora Parish - designated for Polish immigrants in Clinton, Massachusetts, United States.

Founded 1913. It is one of the Polish-American Roman Catholic parishes in New England in the Diocese of Worcester.
Merged July 1, 2010 to form St John the Guardian of Our Lady, Clinton.

== Bibliography ==
- Our Lady of Czestochowa Parish - Centennial 1893-1993. Our Lady of Czestochowa, Boston. 1993.
- The Official Catholic Directory in USA
