= Holy Trinity Parish, Hatfield =

Coordinates: 42°22′32.2″N 72°35′45.3″W

Holy Trinity Parish
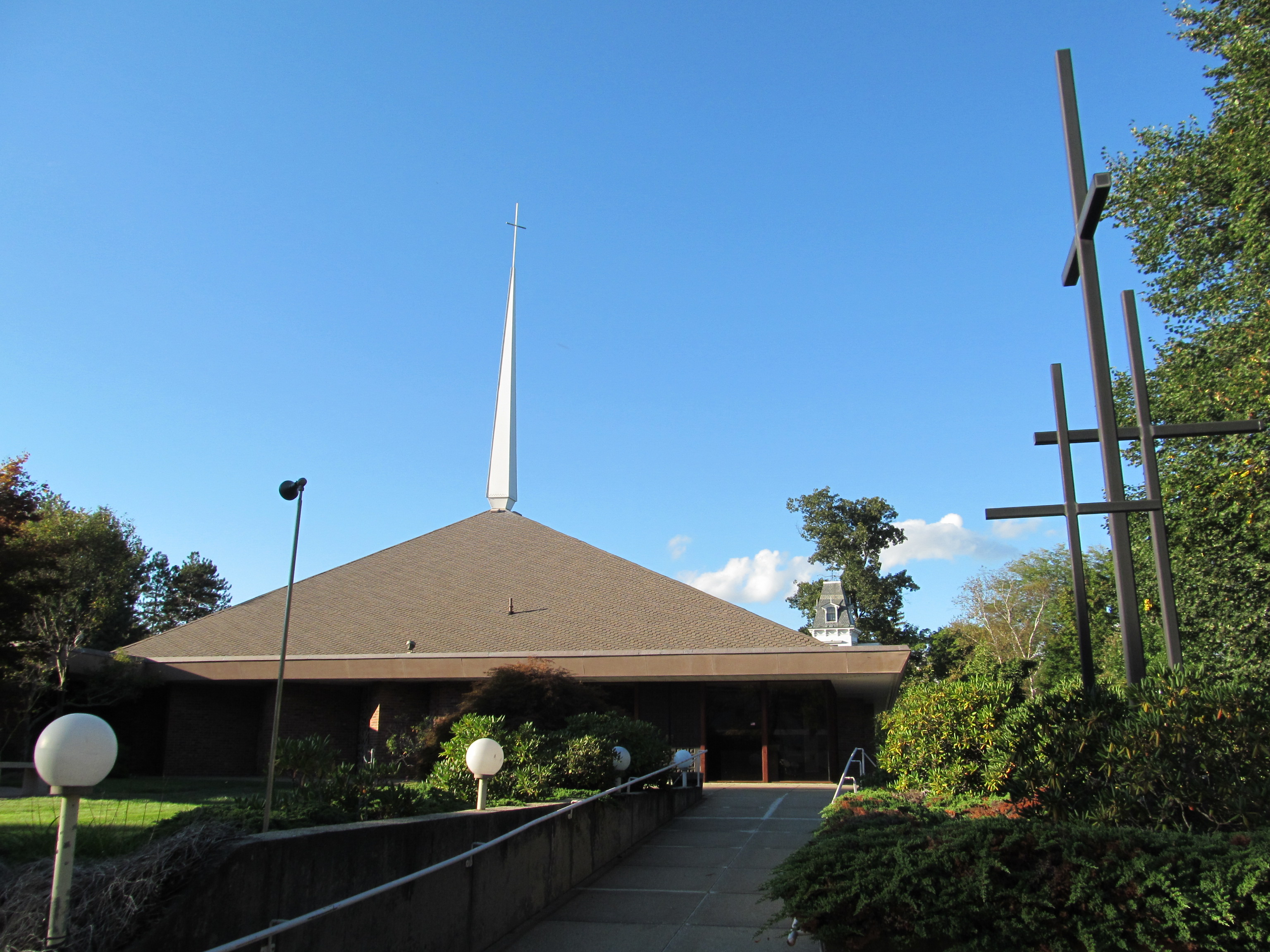
- Holy Trinity Parish in 2012
- Holy Trinity Parish
- Location: 79 Main Street; Hatfield, Massachusetts
- Country: United States
- Denomination: Roman Catholic

History
- Status: defunct
- Founded: 1916
- Founder: Polish immigrants
- Dedication: Holy Trinity

Architecture
- Closed: 2009

Administration
- Division: Region 5
- Province: Boston
- Diocese: Springfield in Massachusetts

Clergy
- Bishop: Most Rev. Timothy A. McDonnell
- Pastor: Rev. Robert J Coonan

Holy Trinity Parish was a church designated for Polish immigrants in Hatfield, Massachusetts, United States.

It was founded in 1916. It was one of the Polish-American Roman Catholic parishes in New England in the Diocese of Springfield in Massachusetts.

The parish was closed at the end of 2009.

== Bibliography ==
- The 150th Anniversary of Polish-American Pastoral Ministry. Webster, Massachusetts: St. Joseph Basilica. September 11, 2005.
- Jendrysik, Stephen R. (2005). The Polish Community of Chicopee (MA). Charleston, SC: Arcadia Publishing. ISBN 0-7385-3892-2.
- The Official Catholic Directory in USA

== See also ==
- Cain, Chad (August 29, 2009). Plan means end, merger for many county parishes. Gazettenet.com.
