= Holy Trinity Parish, Westfield =

Coordinates: 42°07′38″N 72°44′47.7″W

Holy Trinity Parish
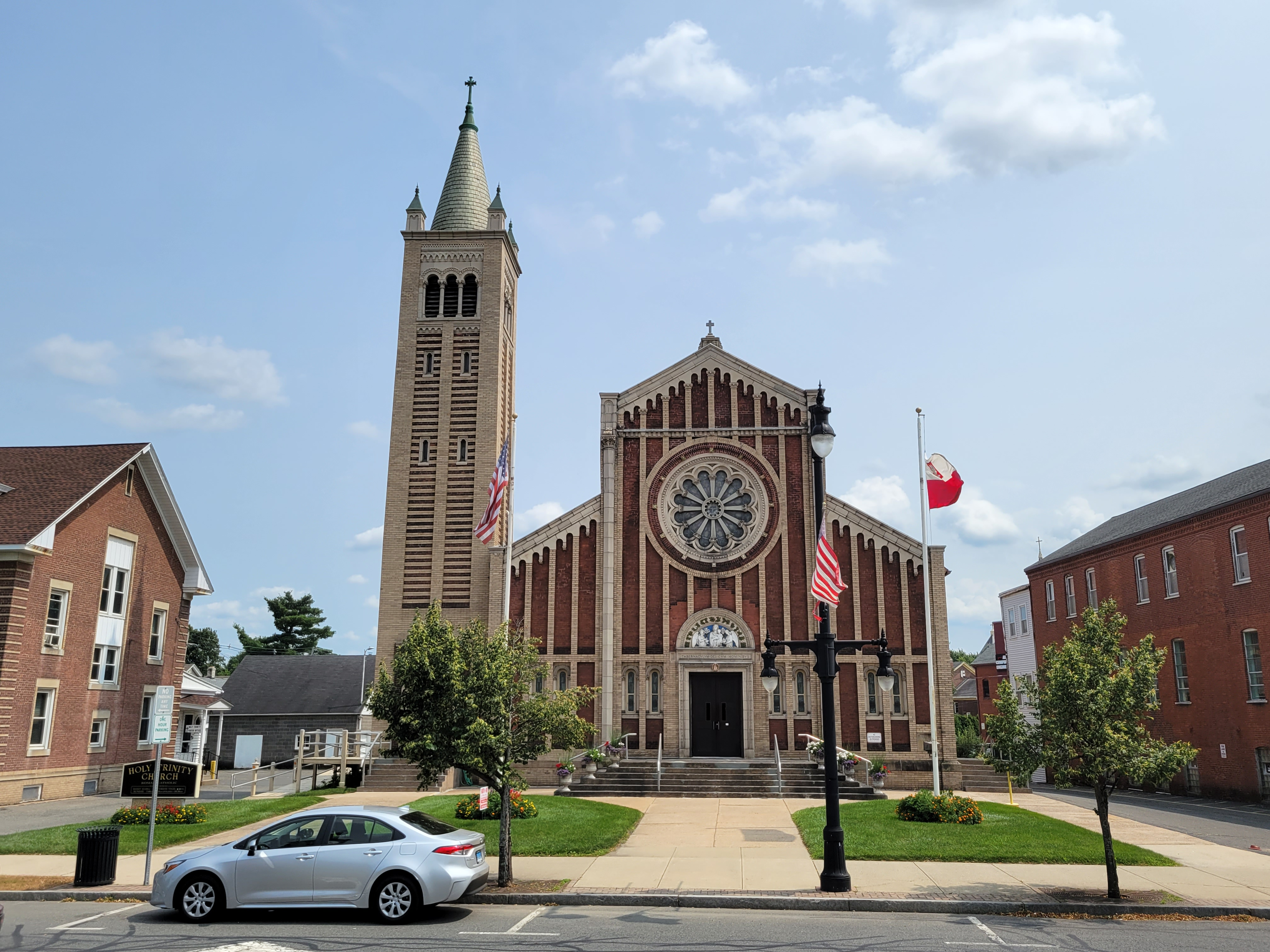
- Holy Trinity Church
- Holy Trinity Parish
- Location: 335 Elm Street; Westfield, Massachusetts
- Country: United States
- Denomination: Roman Catholic
- Churchmanship: Polish
- Website: http://www.holytrinitywestfield.com/

History
- Status: Active
- Founded: 1903
- Founder: Polish immigrants
- Dedication: Holy Trinity

Administration
- Division: Region 10
- Province: Boston
- Diocese: Diocese of Springfield in Massachusetts
- Parish: Missionaries of La Salette

Clergy
- Bishop: Most Rev. William D. Byrne
- Pastor: Rev. Duy Le

Holy Trinity Parish - designated for Polish immigrants in Westfield, Massachusetts, United States.

Founded 1903. It is one of the Polish-American Roman Catholic parishes in New England in the Diocese of Springfield in Massachusetts.

== Bibliography ==
- The 150th Anniversary of Polish-American Pastoral Ministry. Webster, Massachusetts: St. Joseph Basilica. September 11, 2005.
- The Official Catholic Directory in USA
