= St. Casimir Parish, Maynard =

St. Casimir Parish
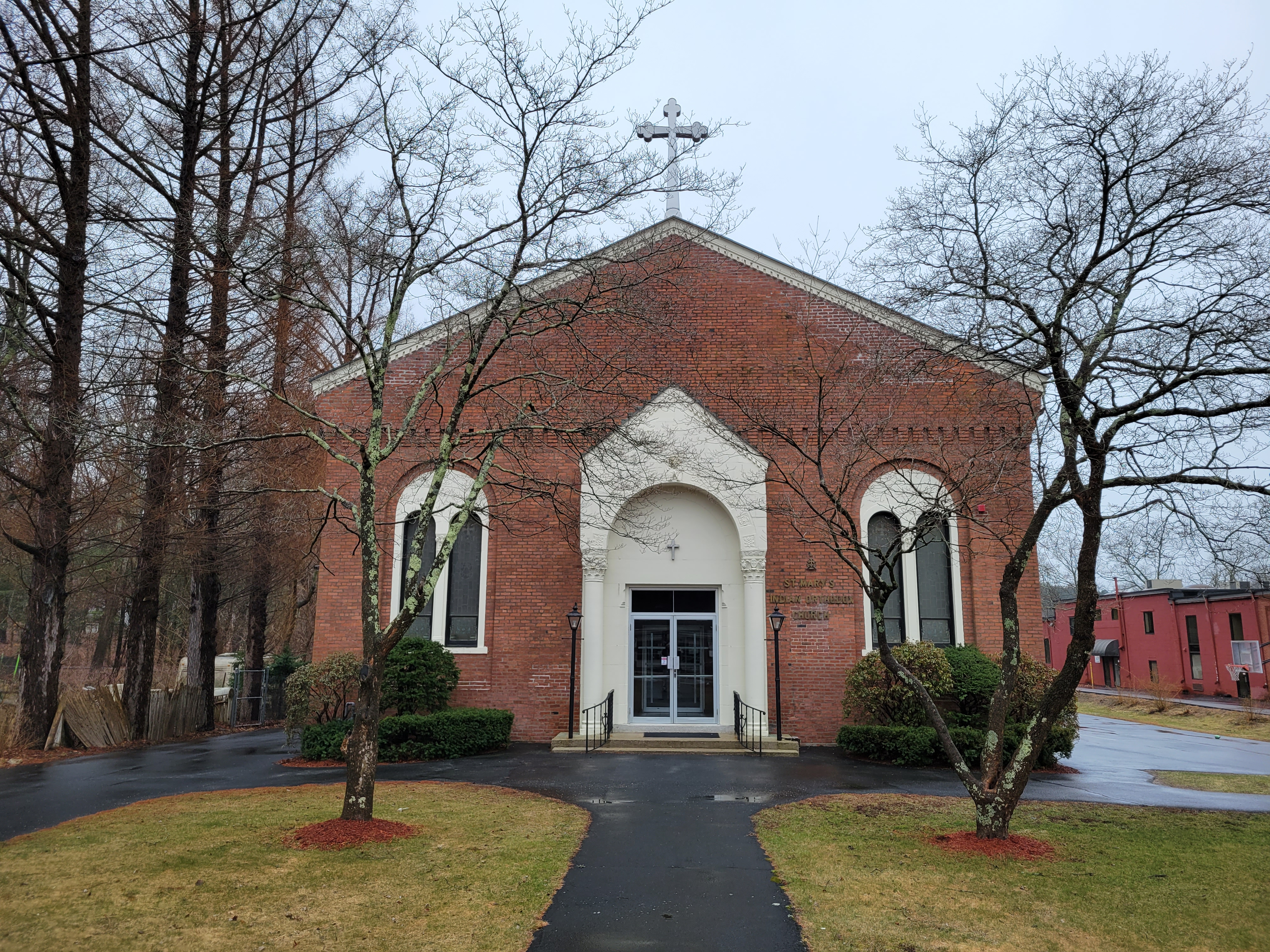
- Saint Casimir's Polish Catholic Church
- St. Casimir Parish
- 42°25′40.1″N 71°28′02.0″W
- Location: 65 Great Road; Maynard, Massachusetts
- Country: United States
- Denomination: Roman Catholic

History
- Founded: 1912
- Founder: Polish immigrants
- Dedication: St. Casimir

Architecture
- Closed: July 1, 1997

Administration
- Division: Vicariate I
- District: West Pastoral Region
- Province: Boston
- Archdiocese: Boston

St. Casimir Parish was a church designated for Polish immigrants in Maynard, Massachusetts, United States.

It was founded in 1912. It was one of the Polish-American Roman Catholic parishes in New England in the Archdiocese of Boston.

The parish was closed July 1, 1997. Parish records moved to the St. Bridget Parish.

== Bibliography ==
- Our Lady of Czestochowa Parish - Centennial 1893-1993
- The Official Catholic Directory in USA
