= St. Casimir Parish, Warren =

Coordinates: 41°53′6.5″N 71°23′1.2″W

St. Casimir Parish
- St. Casimir Parish
- Location: 228 Child Street; Warren, Rhode Island
- Country: United States
- Denomination: Roman Catholic

History
- Founded: 1908
- Founder: Polish immigrants
- Dedication: St. Casimir

Architecture
- Closed: 2017
- Demolished: church & rectory demolished 2017

Administration
- Province: Hartford
- Diocese: Providence

St. Casimir Parish was a parish created for Polish immigrants in Warren, Rhode Island, United States. In September, 1908, St. Casimir's was established as a parish. Bishop Matthew Harrkins of Providence appointed Peter Switala its first pastor. It is one of the Polish-American Roman Catholic parishes in New England in the Diocese of Providence. The church was demolished and parish shut down in 2017 following faltering attendance, staff downsizing, and then-temporary suspensions of service due to building damage.

Church plans were drawn by architect Walter F. Fontaine and contractor Thomas Loughran. The cornerstone was laid on July 25, 1909, by Bishop Harkins and the dedication ceremonies were held on December 19, 1909. A large bell for the Church was donated by the family of Anthony Mikulski. In the year of 1910, the Rosary Society was organized by Father Peter Switala.

== See also ==
- Catholic Church in the United States
- Catholic parish church
- Index of Catholic Church articles
- Pastoral care

== Bibliography ==
- Kruszka, Waclaw (1998). A History of the Poles in America to 1908; Part III: Poles in the Eastern and Southern States. Washington, D.C.: The Catholic University of America Press.
- The 150th Anniversary of Polish-American Pastoral Ministry. Webster, Massachusetts: St. Joseph Basilica. September 11, 2005.
- The Official Catholic Directory in USA
