= Holy Trinity Parish, Lawrence =

Holy Trinity Parish
- Holy Trinity Parish
- 42°42′29″N 71°09′13.4″W
- Location: 35 Essex Street; Lawrence, Massachusetts
- Country: United States
- Denomination: Roman Catholic

History
- Founded: 1905
- Founder: Polish immigrants
- Dedication: Holy Trinity

Architecture
- Closed: November 1, 2004

Administration
- Division: Vicariate III
- District: Merrimack Pastoral Region
- Province: Boston
- Archdiocese: Boston

Holy Trinity Parish was designated for Polish immigrants in Lawrence, Massachusetts, United States.

It was founded 1905. It was one of the Polish-American Roman Catholic parishes in New England in the Archdiocese of Boston.

The parish was closed November 1, 2004.

== Bibliography ==
- Our Lady of Czestochowa Parish - Centennial 1893-1993
- The Official Catholic Directory in USA
