= St. Casimir Parish, Terryville =

Coordinates: 41°40′38.8″N 73°00′11.2″W

Saint Casimir Roman Catholic Church
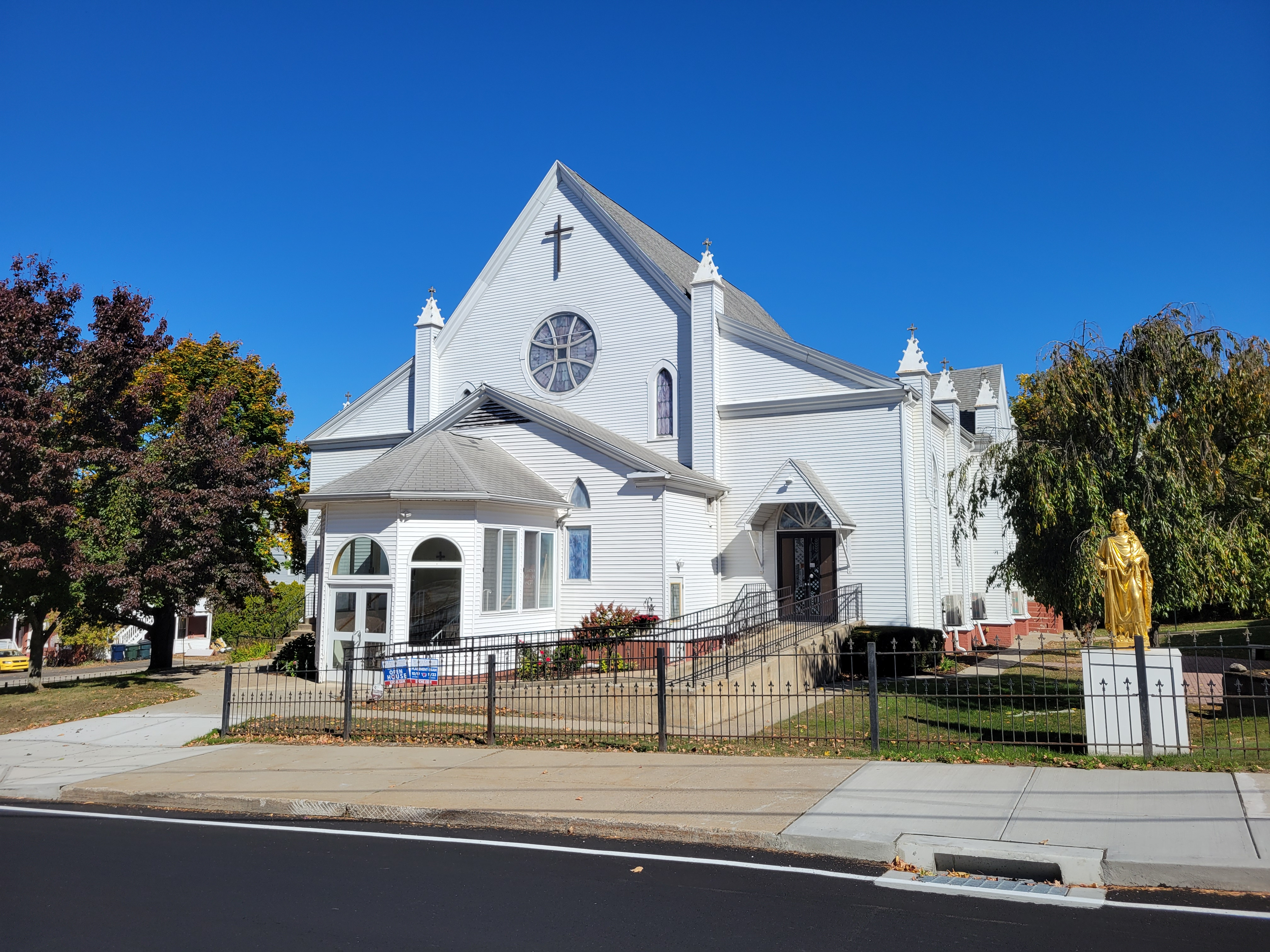
- Saint Casimir Church
- Saint Casimir Roman Catholic Church
- Location: 17 Allen Street; Terryville, Connecticut
- Country: United States
- Denomination: Roman Catholic
- Website: Parish website

History
- Founded: September
- Founder: Polish immigrants
- Dedication: St. Casimir

Administration
- Division: Western Vicariate
- Province: Hartford
- Archdiocese: Hartford

Clergy
- Archbishop: Most Rev. Leonard Blairl,
- Vicar: Rev. Faron Calumba (parochial vicar for Terryville)
- Priest: Rev. Joseph Crowley (Administrator)

St. Casimir Parish - Roman Catholic Church in Terryville, Connecticut, United States.

Founded in 1906. It is one of the Polish-American Roman Catholic parishes in New England in the Archdiocese of Hartford.

In 2017, the parishes of Immaculate Conception, Saint Casimir, and Saint Thomas were merged by decree into the Parish of Saint Maximilian Kolbe. Since that time, these three churches have worked together to build a strong parish of believers in Jesus Christ while respecting the unique identity, rituals, traditions, and roots of each parish.

== History ==
The journey of Saint Casimir Church began in the early 1890s when the number of Polish immigrants in Terryville sharply increased. At first, they worshipped at Immaculate Conception. However, like other nationalities, these early Polish Catholics yearned for a church with a priest to administer to their needs in their native language.

In December 1900, a Polish fraternal organization, the St. Casimir Society, was formed and became the major force in pursuit of a Polish parish in Terryville. After the establishment of by-laws and a resolution to form their own parish, the St. Casimir Society immediately organized a monthly, door-to-door fund drive to raise money to build a church. Within a year, enough money was collected to purchase land. Despite the ongoing fund drives and the purchase of land, local and diocesan opposition seemed insurmountable, but this did not deter these early parishioners from pursuing their dream for a Polish parish. In January 1905, a meeting was held with the Apostolic Delegate in Washington, D.C., and, as a result, in March 1906, Father Joseph Raniszewski was appointed pastor of Saint Casimir Parish.

During his first months in Terryville, Father Raniszewski held Sunday Mass at the Immaculate Conception Church and, then, at rented halls, including the original Lyceum Building. However, since the construction of the church and rectory was started simultaneously upon the new pastor's arrival, the rectory was completed first and was used for daily masses. As of May 1906, the cornerstone of the church was laid in place and, on Labor Day of that same year, Bishop Tierney consecrated St. Casimir Church.

== Pastors ==
- Rev. Joseph Raniszewski (1906 – 1911)
- Rev. Ludwig Rusin (1911 – 1918)
- Rev. Paul Koszczyk (1918 – 1920)
- Rev. Peter Kaczmarski (1920 – 1932)
- Rev. Peter Sroka (1932 – 1959)
- Rev. Julius Pac (1959 – 1975)
- Rev. Stephen Ptaszynski (1976 – 1993)
- Rev. Daniel Karpey (1993 – 1999)
- Rev. Gerald Dziedzic (1999 – 2012)
- Rev. Marcin P Pluciennik (2012 – 2015)
- Rev. Tomasz Sztuber (2015 – 2017) (Administrator)
- Rev. Joseph P. Crowley (since 2017) (Administrator)

== Bibliography ==
- The 150th Anniversary of Polish-American Pastoral Ministry. Webster, Massachusetts: St. Joseph Basilica. September 11, 2005.
- The Official Catholic Directory in United States
