= Immaculate Conception Parish, Springfield =

Coordinates: 42°06′8.9″N 72°36′34.6″W

Immaculate Conception Parish
- Immaculate Conception Parish
- Location: 475 Main Street; Springfield, Massachusetts
- Country: United States
- Denomination: Roman Catholic

History
- Founded: 1905
- Founder: Polish immigrants
- Dedication: Immaculate Conception

Administration
- Division: Region 9
- Province: Boston
- Diocese: Springfield in Massachusetts

Immaculate Conception Parish - designated for Polish immigrants in Springfield, Massachusetts, United States.

Founded 1905. It is one of the Polish-American Roman Catholic parishes in New England in the Diocese of Springfield in Massachusetts.

Citing insufficient parishioners the diocese had planned to close the parish in 2009. Following closure it would have merged with Christ the King Parish in Ludlow. However, the local community opposed the move and became the only parish in Springfield proper to receive a temporary reprieve while efforts were made to reverse the decision.. Re-opened in 2018.

== Bibliography ==
- The 150th Anniversary of Polish-American Pastoral Ministry. Webster, Massachusetts: St. Joseph Basilica. September 11, 2005.
- The Official Catholic Directory in USA

== See also ==
- Pastoral planning in Diocese of Springfield in Massachusetts
