= St. Joseph Parish, Rockville =

Coordinates: 41°52′5.9″N 72°27′50.6″W

St. Joseph Parish
- St. Joseph Parish
- Location: 33 West Street; Rockville, Connecticut
- Country: United States
- Denomination: Roman Catholic
- Website: Parish website

History
- Founded: April 26, 1905
- Founder: Polish immigrants
- Dedication: St. Joseph

Administration
- Province: Hartford
- Diocese: Norwich
- Parish: Pauline

Clergy
- Bishop: Most Rev. Michael Richard Cote
- Vicar(s): Rev. Rafal Walczyk, Ass't. Vicar O.S.P.P.E.
- Pastor: Rev. Tadeusz Zadorozny

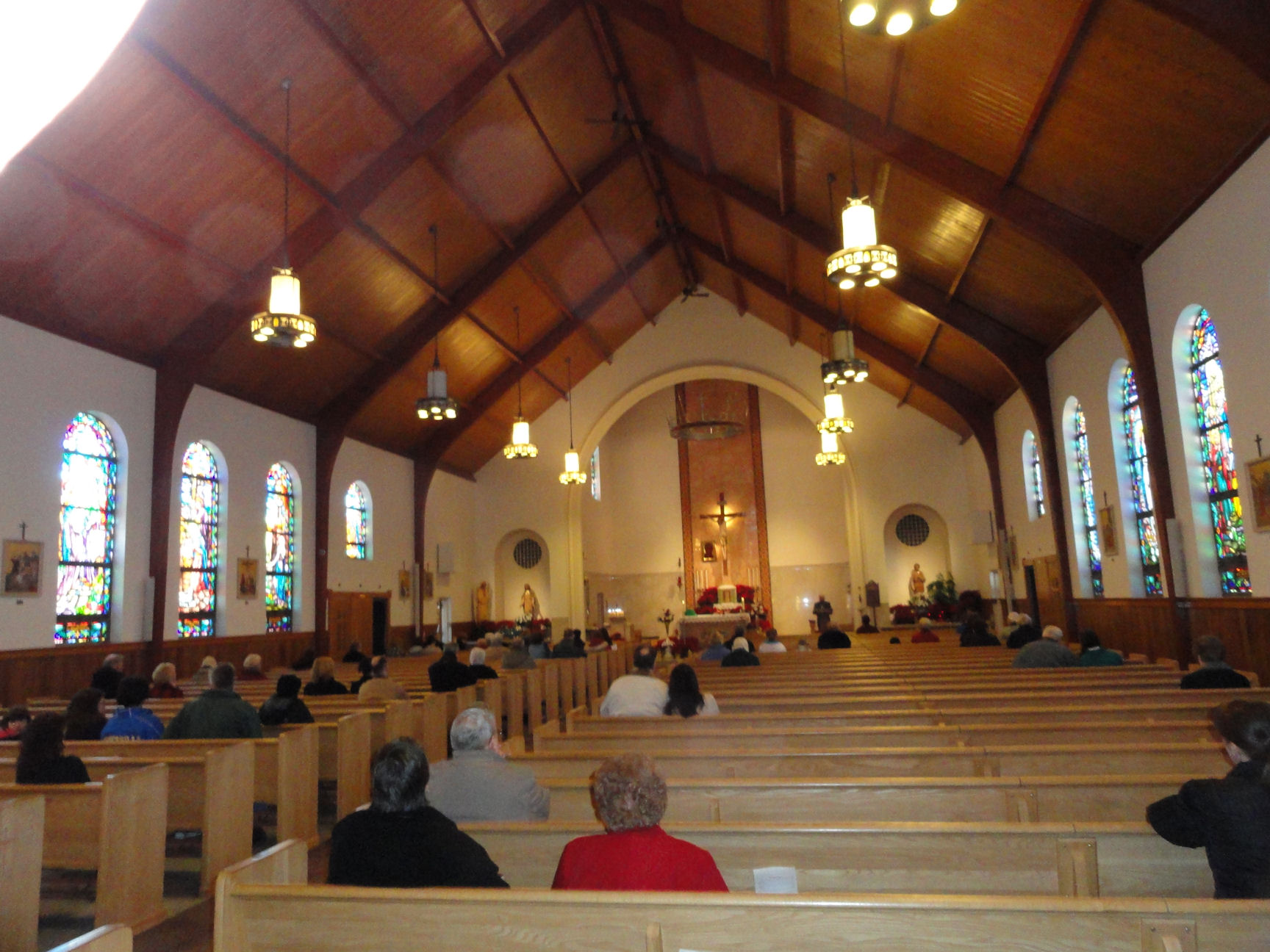
St. Joseph Church Rockville Connecticut interior in January 2011.

St. Joseph Parish - originally established in 1905 for Polish immigrants in Rockville, Connecticut, United States. St. Joseph church has been a multi-ethnic parish since the 1950s under Fr. Hyacinth Lepak (1949–1975) and continues to be a diversely ethnic American parish community. ( See "History" link at www.stjosephct.org for additional background). Visit St. Joseph Church on your tablet or phone for more parish community news and resources.

== Pastors ==
- Rev. Charles Wotypka (1905–1908)
- Rev. Joseph Culkowski (1908–1909)
- Rev. Maximilian Soltysek (1909–1917)
- Rev. Leon Wierzynski (1917–1918)
- Rev. Franciszek Wladasz (1918–1922)
- Rev. Stefan Bartkowski (1922–1927)
- Rev. Zygmunt Woroniecki (1927–1949)
- Rev. Hyacinth Lepak (1949–1975)
- Rev. Aloysius Kisluk (1975–1988)
- Rev. Joseph Hanks (1988–1994)
- Rev. Joseph M. Olczak (1994–2008)
- Fr. Krzysztof Wieliczko O.S.P.P.E. (2008–2010)
- Fr. Krzysztof Drybka O.S.P.P.E. (2010- 2021)
- Fr. Bogdan Olzacki O.S.P.P.E. (2016- 2021)
- Rev. Tadeusz Zadorozny (2021-present)

== Bibliography ==
- Olson, James Stuart (1987). Catholic immigrants in America. St. Mary of Czestochowa Church.
- The 150th Anniversary of Polish-American Pastoral Ministry. Webster, Massachusetts: St. Joseph Basilica. September 11, 2005.
- Geller, Herbert F. Ethnic History Series: European Immigrants and the Catholic Church of Connecticut, 1870-1920. THE SUNDAY POST: Dolores Liptak.
- The Official Catholic Directory in USA
