= St. Hedwig Parish, Southbridge =

Coordinates: 42°04′17.9″N 72°02′2.2″W

St. Hedwig Parish
- St. Hedwig Parish
- Location: 29 Summer Street; Southbridge, Massachusetts
- Country: United States
- Denomination: Roman Catholic

History
- Founded: 1916
- Founder: Polish immigrants
- Dedication: St. Hedwig

Architecture
- Closed: July 1, 2011

Administration
- Division: Cluster 29
- Province: Boston
- Diocese: Worcester

St. Hedwig Parish was a national parish designated for Polish immigrants in Southbridge, Massachusetts, United States. Founded 1916 among other Polish-American parishes in the Diocese of Worcester, it closed July 1, 2011.

== Bibliography ==
- Our Lady of Czestochowa Parish - Centennial 1893-1993. Our Lady of Czestochowa, Boston. 1993.
- The Official Catholic Directory in USA
