= St. Hedwig Cemetery =

St. Hedwig Cemetery may refer to:

- St. Hedwig Cemetery (Massachusetts), in Southbridge, Massachusetts, United States
- St. Hedwig Cemetery (Michigan), in Dearborn Heights, Michigan, United States
- St. Hedwig Cemetery (New Jersey), in Mercer County, New Jersey, United States
- St. Hedwig Cemetery (Wisconsin), in Thorp, Wisconsin, United States
- St. Hedwig Cemetery (Berlin), with St. Hedwig's Cathedral in Berlin, Germany
- St. Hedwig Cemetery (Pennsylvania) in Larksville, Pennsylvania, United States
