= St. Hedwig Parish, Cambridge =

St. Hedwig Parish
- Location within Boston
- 42°22′14.5″N 71°04′57.3″W
- Location: 99 Otis Street (Church), 100 Otis St (Rectory); Cambridge, Massachusetts
- Country: United States
- Denomination: Catholic Church
- Sui iuris church: Latin Church

History
- Founded: 1907
- Founder: Polish immigrants
- Dedication: St. Hedwig

Architecture
- Closed: April 23, 1995

Administration
- Province: Boston
- Archdiocese: Boston

St. Hedwig Parish is a former Catholic parish designated for Polish immigrants in Cambridge, Massachusetts, United States. Founded in 1907, it was one of the Polish-American Roman Catholic parishes in New England within the Archdiocese of Boston.

The last pastor of the parish, from 1964, was Monsignor Francis Chmaj. The parish closed on June 15, 1995 after a final mass was held on April 23, 1995.

After World War II, the parish served as a gathering place for the Polish Armed Forces officers who settled in the Boston area.

== Bibliography ==
- Our Lady of Czestochowa Parish - Centennial 1893–1993
- The Official Catholic Directory in USA
