= St. Andrew Bobola Parish, Dudley =

Coordinates: 42°02′47.6″N 71°53′38.4″W

St. Andrew Bobola Parish
- St. Andrew Bobola Parish
- Location: 54 West Main Street; Dudley, Massachusetts
- Country: United States
- Denomination: Roman Catholic
- Website: http://www.standrewbobola.com/

History
- Founded: 1963
- Founder: Polish immigrants
- Dedication: St. Andrew Bobola

Administration
- Division: Cluster 27
- Province: Boston
- Diocese: Worcester

Clergy
- Bishop: Most Rev. Robert Joseph McManus
- Vicar: Rev. Joseph R Bielonko
- Pastor: Rev. (Chris) Krzysztof Korcz

St. Andrew Bobola Parish was founded by Polish immigrants to Dudley, Massachusetts, United States, in 1963, as part of the Polish-American Roman Catholic parishes in New England and the Diocese of Worcester.

== Bibliography ==
- Our Lady of Czestochowa Parish - Centennial 1893-1993. Our Lady of Czestochowa, Boston. 1993.
- The Official Catholic Directory in USA
