= Richmond, Massachusetts =

- Town
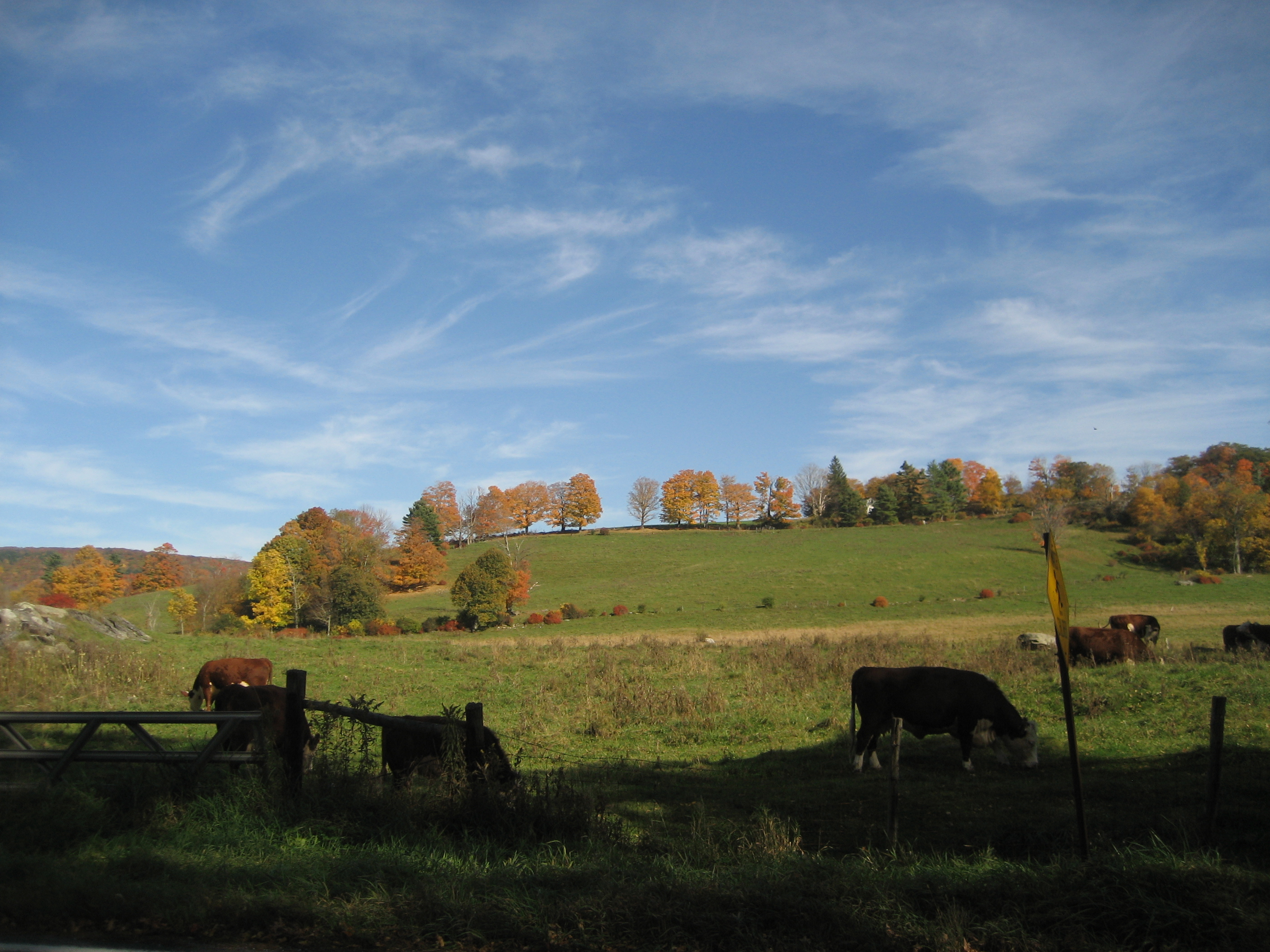
- View of a farm in Richmond

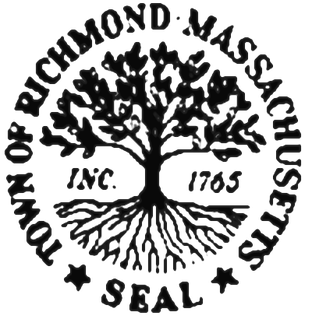
- Seal

- Location in Berkshire County and the state of Massachusetts.
- Coordinates: 42°22′23″N 73°22′05″W
- Country: United States
- State: Massachusetts
- County: Berkshire
- Settled: 1760
- Incorporated: 1765

Government
  - Type: Open town meeting

Area
  - Total: 19.0 sq mi (49.2 km^{2})
  - Land: 18.7 sq mi (48.4 km^{2})
  - Water: 0.31 sq mi (0.8 km^{2})
- Elevation: 1,056 ft (322 m)

Population (2020)
  - Total: 1,407
  - Density: 75.3/sq mi (29.1/km^{2})
- Time zone: UTC-5 (Eastern)
  - Summer (DST): UTC-4 (Eastern)
- ZIP Codes: 01254 (Richmond); 01201 (Pittsfield)
- Area code: 413
- FIPS code: 25-56795
- GNIS feature ID: 0619425
- Website: www.richmondma.org

Richmond is a town in Berkshire County, Massachusetts, United States. It is part of the Pittsfield, Massachusetts Metropolitan Statistical Area. The population was 1,407 at the 2020 census.

== History ==
Present day Richmond was first settled by Micah Mudge and Ichabod Wood in 1759. Mudge migrated up to Richmond from Connecticut via the Housatonic River, while Wood came from Rehoboth on the eastern seaboard. It is thought that the two did not make contact until after the first winter, as their initial settlements were separated by about three miles of dense wilderness.

By 1762, as settlers continued to migrate to the area, Massachusetts was putting pressure on committees to organize all unmarked land into townships. Under the act of 1762, the land encompassing present day Richmond and Lenox, Massachusetts was purchased from two Indian Sachems named Yokun and Ephraim. Two distinct villages began to form, separated by the six-mile mountain ridge known today as Yokun Ridge—Yokuntown to the east and Mt. Ephraim to the west.

Under an Act of Incorporation dated June 21, 1765, these two villages became one town named Richmont. However, the mountain separating the two villages of Richmont presented difficulties in communication, and on February 26, 1767, the eastern portion of the town separated into a district known as Lenox, with its own separate meeting house. The new border was not fully established for years, and there were documented disputes at least five years after the separation. In 1785, Richmont officially became known as Richmond, and in 1787, when the County Court moved from Great Barrington to Lenox, it became clear that Lenox and Richmond were fully functioning as their own towns.

The naming of both Richmond and Lenox are somewhat disputed. It is likely that Francis Bernard, Captain General and Commander in Chief of the Province of Massachusetts Bay in New England, gave Richmont and Lenox their respective names. It is thought by some that he did so with Charles Lennox, Duke of Richmond, in mind, though that has never been proven. Lennox was an influencing, liberal figure and a firm supporter of the Colonies in the debates leading up to the American Revolution. He didn’t become well known until after 1770, though, and his most famous speech wasn’t given until 1778, which has led to debate as to whether or not Richmond and Lenox were originally named after the Duke. At any rate, when Richmont petitioned to have its final consonant changed from “t” to “d”, it was most certainly done in honor of Charles, Duke of Richmond.

The town of Richmond was mostly agrarian until the discovery of iron ore in 1829, which led to an iron works which lasted into the twentieth century.

== Geography ==
According to the United States Census Bureau, the town has a total area of 19.0 square miles (49.2 km^{2}), of which 18.7 square miles (48.4 km^{2}) is land and 0.31 square miles (0.8 km^{2}), or 1.71%, is water.

Richmond is bordered on the north by Hancock and Pittsfield, on the east by Lenox, on the south by Stockbridge and West Stockbridge, and on the west by Canaan, Columbia County, New York.

Massachusetts Route 41 passes from north to south through the town, and Route 295, the state's highest-numbered state route, continues from Route 41 to the corresponding New York state route. The nearest interstate is Interstate 90, also known as the Massachusetts Turnpike. Exit 1 is located two miles further south along Route 41, but only allows for westbound exit and eastbound entrance. The nearest westbound entrance to the interstate is in Canaan, at the Berkshire Spur (Connector) portion of the New York State Thruway, Exit B3. The nearest municipal airport is Pittsfield Municipal Airport, 5.5 miles (8.9 km) away, and the nearest airport serving national flights is Albany International Airport, 45 miles (72 km) northwest of the town. There is no bus service in town, and the nearest bus station is in Pittsfield. There is also a CSX freight rail line which passes through the town.

== Demographics ==
Historical population
| Year | Pop. | ±% |
|---|---|---|
| 1790 | 1,255 | — |
| 1850 | 907 | −27.7% |
| 1860 | 914 | +0.8% |
| 1870 | 1,091 | +19.4% |
| 1880 | 1,124 | +3.0% |
| 1890 | 796 | −29.2% |
| 1900 | 679 | −14.7% |
| 1910 | 650 | −4.3% |
| 1920 | 561 | −13.7% |
| 1930 | 583 | +3.9% |
| 1940 | 624 | +7.0% |
| 1950 | 737 | +18.1% |
| 1960 | 890 | +20.8% |
| 1970 | 1,461 | +64.2% |
| 1980 | 1,659 | +13.6% |
| 1990 | 1,677 | +1.1% |
| 2000 | 1,604 | −4.4% |
| 2010 | 1,475 | −8.0% |
| 2020 | 1,407 | −4.6% |
| 2022* | 1,402 | −0.4% |
* = population estimate. Source: United States census records and Population Estimates Program data.

As of the census of 2000, there were 1,604 people, 643 households, and 480 families residing in the town. The town ranks 16th out of the 32 towns in Berkshire County, and 304th out of 351 in the Commonwealth by population. The population density was 84.6 inhabitants per square mile (32.7/km^{2}), placing it 14th in the county and 293rd in the Commonwealth. There were 833 housing units at an average density of 43.9 per square mile (16.9/km^{2}). The racial makeup of the town was 97.63% White, 1.00% African American, 0.50% Native American, 0.44% Asian, 0.06% Pacific Islander, 0.37% from other races. Hispanic or Latino of any race were 0.56% of the population.

There were 643 households, out of which 27.7% had children under the age of 18 living with them, 64.4% were married couples living together, 8.2% had a female householder with no husband present, and 25.2% were non-families. 20.8% of all households were made up of individuals, and 9.5% had someone living alone who was 65 years of age or older. The average household size was 2.49 and the average family size was 2.89.

In the town, the population was spread out, with 21.5% under the age of 18, 4.9% from 18 to 24, 22.9% from 25 to 44, 35.0% from 45 to 64, and 15.7% who were 65 years of age or older. The median age was 45 years. For every 100 females, there were 96.8 males. For every 100 females age 18 and over, there were 92.2 males.

The median income for a household in the town was $60,917, and the median income for a family was $72,500. Males had a median income of $45,536 versus $36,250 for females. The per capita income for the town was $35,568. About 1.9% of families and 3.1% of the population were below the poverty line, including 0.9% of those under age 18 and 3.2% of those age 65 or over.

== Government ==
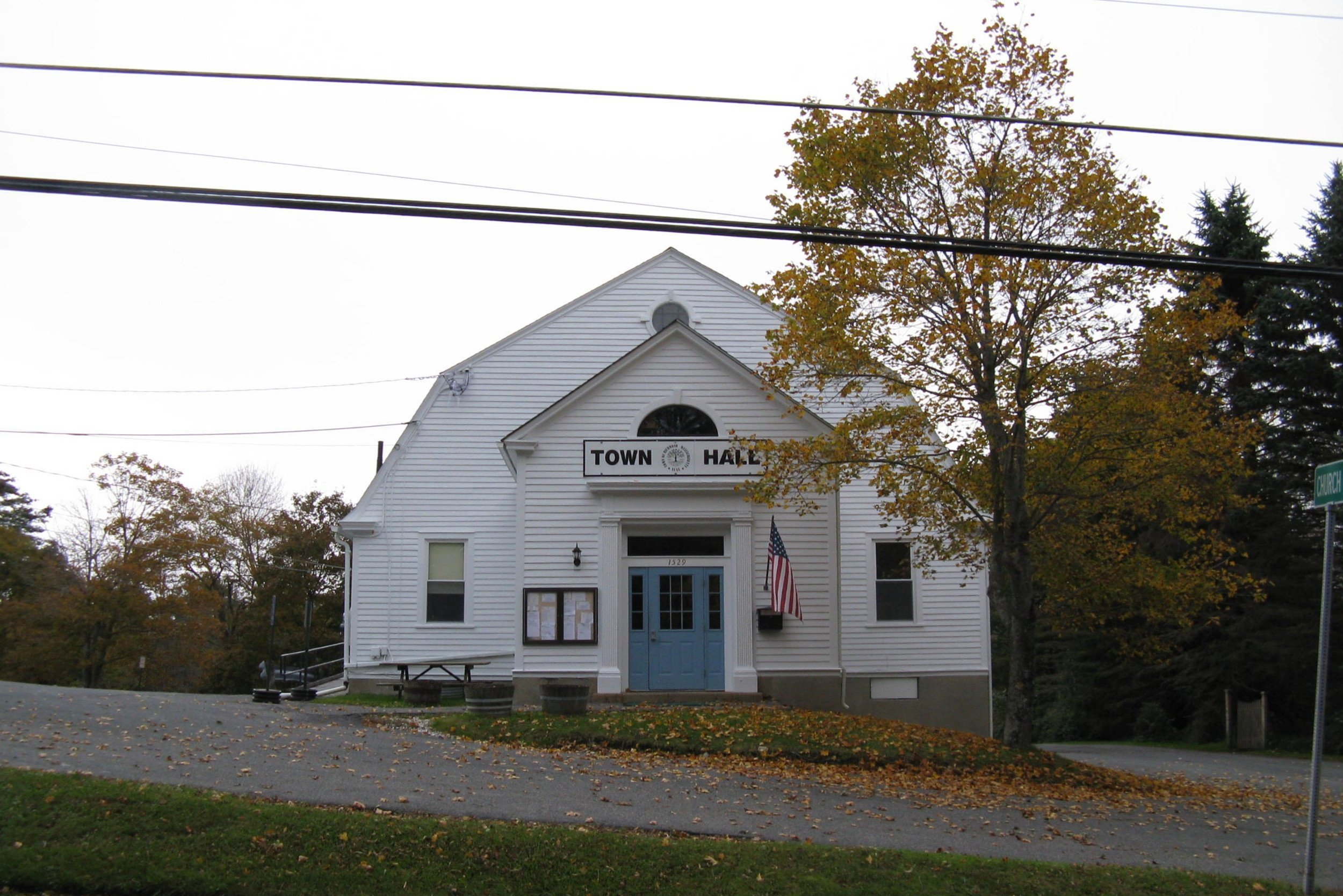
Town Hall

Richmond is governed by the open town meeting form of government, and is governed by a board of selectmen. The town has its own volunteer fire department. The town has its own library and other public services.

On the state level, Richmond is represented in the Massachusetts House of Representatives as part of the Second Berkshire district, represented by Paul Mark, which covers central Berkshire County, as well as portions of Hampshire and Franklin counties. In the Massachusetts Senate, the town is part of the Berkshire, Hampshire and Franklin district, represented by Adam Hinds, which includes all of Berkshire County and western Hampshire and Franklin counties. The town is patrolled by the First (Lee) Station of Barracks "B" of the Massachusetts State Police.

On the national level, Richmond is represented in the United States House of Representatives as part of Massachusetts's 1st congressional district, and has been represented by John Olver of Amherst from June 1991 to 2013 when Olver retired and redistricting put Richard Neal in the 1st district. Massachusetts is currently represented in the United States Senate by Elizabeth Warren and Ed Markey.

Richmond presidential election results
| Year | Democratic | Republican | Third parties | Total Votes | Margin |
|---|---|---|---|---|---|
| 2020 | 78.33% 828 | 20.34% 215 | 1.32% 14 | 1,057 | 57.99% |
| 2016 | 71.10% 706 | 21.95% 218 | 6.95% 69 | 993 | 49.14% |
| 2012 | 74.76% 702 | 24.28% 228 | 0.96% 9 | 939 | 50.48% |
| 2008 | 74.69% 720 | 23.13% 223 | 2.18% 21 | 964 | 51.56% |
| 2004 | 75.25% 751 | 22.65% 226 | 2.10% 21 | 998 | 52.61% |
| 2000 | 63.03% 600 | 26.16% 249 | 10.82% 103 | 952 | 36.87% |
| 1996 | 60.83% 573 | 26.01% 245 | 13.16% 124 | 942 | 34.82% |
| 1992 | 51.22% 482 | 24.02% 226 | 24.76% 233 | 941 | 26.46% |
| 1988 | 53.67% 475 | 46.21% 409 | 0.11% 1 | 885 | 7.46% |
| 1984 | 37.10% 312 | 62.43% 525 | 0.48% 4 | 841 | 25.33% |
| 1980 | 35.45% 324 | 46.61% 426 | 17.94% 164 | 914 | 11.16% |
| 1976 | 45.27% 383 | 51.06% 432 | 3.66% 31 | 846 | 5.79% |
| 1972 | 41.17% 303 | 57.47% 423 | 1.36% 10 | 736 | 16.30% |
| 1968 | 44.92% 252 | 51.52% 289 | 3.57% 20 | 561 | 6.60% |
| 1964 | 64.05% 310 | 34.92% 169 | 1.03% 5 | 484 | 29.13% |
| 1960 | 37.21% 163 | 62.79% 275 | 0.00% 0 | 438 | 25.57% |
| 1956 | 16.83% 70 | 83.17% 346 | 0.00% 0 | 416 | 66.35% |
| 1952 | 22.34% 88 | 77.16% 304 | 0.51% 2 | 394 | 54.82% |
| 1948 | 24.19% 75 | 73.23% 227 | 2.58% 8 | 310 | 49.03% |
| 1944 | 29.67% 81 | 70.33% 192 | 0.00% 0 | 273 | 40.66% |
| 1940 | 33.33% 99 | 65.66% 195 | 1.01% 3 | 297 | 32.32% |

== Education ==
Richmond has one school, Richmond Consolidated School, which serves students in town from preschool through 8th grades. High school students can attend Lenox Memorial Middle/High School, Monument Mountain Regional High School, Pittsfield High School, Taconic High School, or Lee High School.

The nearest community college, Berkshire Community College, is in Pittsfield. The nearest state college is Massachusetts College of Liberal Arts, and the nearest university is the University of Massachusetts Amherst. The nearest private college is Williams College in nearby Williamstown.

== Notable people ==
- Samuel Betts, New York politician and judge
- Augustine Clarke, Anti-Masonic Party leader and Vermont State Treasurer
- Deval Patrick, American politician, civil rights lawyer, author, and businessman
- Edward Aylesworth Perry, Confederate general and post-bellum Governor of Florida
- Roland Hinton Perry, American painter
- Neal Pilson, former president of CBS Sports and Richmond town selectman
- Rix Robinson, Michigan pioneer, fur merchant and politician
