= John W. Donohue =

John William Donohue
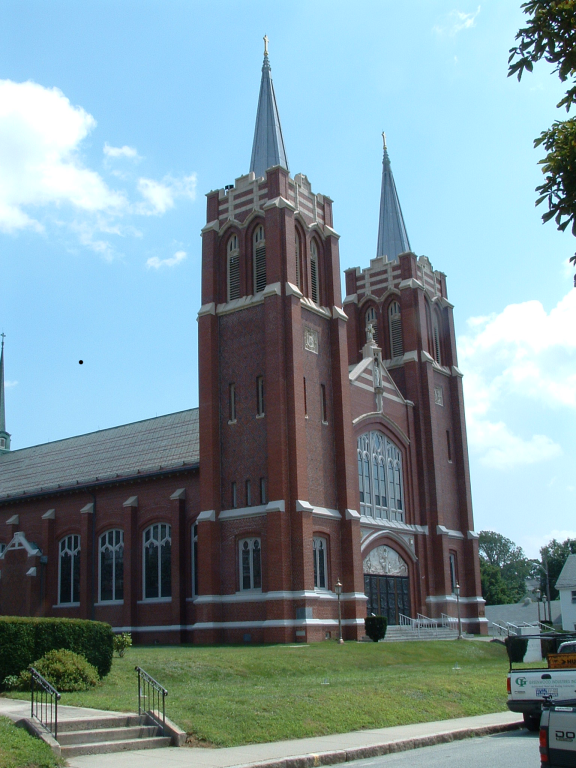
- St. Joseph Basilica, Webster Massachusetts; John W. Donohue, architect
- Born: May 30, 1868; Springfield, Massachusetts
- Died: March 4, 1941 (aged 72); Springfield, Massachusetts
- Occupation: Architect

John W. Donohue, AIA (1869–1941) was an American architect who was active in Western Massachusetts during the first half of the 20th century.

== Life and career ==
John William Donohue was born May 30, 1868, in Springfield, Massachusetts, to Florence J. Donohue and Mary (Walsh) Donohue. His father was a master mason for the Boston and Albany Railroad, and built the headquarters of the railroad in Springfield. Donohue was educated in the Springfield public schools. After graduating from high school in 1887 he entered the civil engineering office of the Boston and Albany before becoming associated with local architect Francis R. Richmond. After seven years with Richmond he opened his own office. Though he was an architect with a general practice, he was appointed architect of the Diocese of Springfield in Massachusetts, and in that role was architect for over twenty Catholic churches in the Springfield diocese, which then also included the territory of the Worcester diocese, in addition to many schools, hospitals and other buildings.

Donohue was associated with architect Burton E. Geckler from 1905 until his retirement in the 1930s. Geckler joined Donohue as a draftsman and later practiced in the same office as an architect. They mostly worked on their projects independently, but collaborated on some projects.

Donohue joined the American Institute of Architects in 1908 and remained a member until his death.

== Personal life ==
Donohue lived at 32 Plainfield Street in Springfield, which has been demolished. He was a parishioner of the R. C. Church of the Sacred Heart in Springfield.

Donohue died March 4, 1941, at home at the age of 72.

== Architectural works ==
=== Churches ===
- St. Casimir, Worcester, Massachusetts (1903–16)
- Our Lady Immaculate, Athol, Massachusetts (1904–05)
- Our Lady of Czestochowa, Worcester, Massachusetts (1904–06)
- St. Vincent de Paul, Lenox Dale, Massachusetts (1904)
- St. Thomas, West Springfield, Massachusetts (1906)
- Holy Trinity, Westfield, Massachusetts (1909)
- Immaculate Heart of Mary, Winchendon, Massachusetts (1909)
- Sacred Heart of Jesus, Easthampton, Massachusetts (1909)
- Our Lady of Mount Carmel, Springfield, Massachusetts (1910–11)
- St. John Cantius, Northampton, Massachusetts (1911–13)
- All Souls, Springfield, Massachusetts (1912–13)
- Immaculate Conception, West Springfield, Massachusetts (1912–13)
- St. Joseph, Gardner, Massachusetts (1912–13)
- St. Joseph, Webster, Massachusetts (1913–14)
- St. Peter, Northbridge, Massachusetts (1913)
- St. Anne, Chicopee, Massachusetts (1915)
- Sacred Heart, Northampton, Massachusetts (1916)
- St. Stephen, Worcester, Massachusetts (1916)
- St. Bernard, Worcester, Massachusetts (1918)
- Blessed Sacrament, Springfield, Massachusetts (1920)
- St. Luke the Evangelist, Westborough, Massachusetts (1920–21)
- Blessed Sacrament, Worcester, Massachusetts (1922–26)
- Our Lady of Mount Carmel, Pittsfield, Massachusetts (1922)
- St. Brigid, Amherst, Massachusetts (1923–24)
- St. Ann, West Springfield, Massachusetts (1924, demolished 2012)
- St. Mary, Uxbridge, Massachusetts (1924–26)
- St. Joseph, Charlton, Massachusetts (1924–25, demolished)
- Corpus Christi, Housatonic, Massachusetts (1910–11)
- Holy Cross, Holyoke, Massachusetts (1925–27)
- Our Lady of Hope, Springfield, Massachusetts (1925–38)
- Our Lady of Vilna, Worcester, Massachusetts (1925–26)
- Our Lady of the Rosary, Russell, Massachusetts (1926)
- Sacred Heart, Southbridge, Massachusetts (1926)
- St. Teresa of the Infant Jesus, Agawam, Massachusetts (1927)
- Our Lady of the Sacred Heart, Springfield, Massachusetts (1929–30)
- St. Mark, Pittsfield, Massachusetts (1931–32)
- St. Mary, Longmeadow, Massachusetts (1931)
- St. Jerome (reconstruction), Holyoke, Massachusetts (1934)
- St. Mary, Pittsfield, Massachusetts (completed 1942)

=== Other parish buildings ===
- Parochial school, St. Mary of the Assumption, Northampton, Massachusetts (1908–09)
- Parochial school and rectory, Holy Name, Springfield, Massachusetts (1909–10)
- Parochial school and chapel, Our Lady of the Rosary, Clinton, Massachusetts (1910–11)
- Parochial school, St. Paul, Worcester, Massachusetts (1911)
- Parochial school, Our Lady of Hope, Springfield, Massachusetts (1917, demolished)
- Parochial school, Our Lady of the Rosary, Springfield, Massachusetts (1919)
- Parochial school, St. John, Clinton, Massachusetts (1919)
- Parochial school, St. Peter, Worcester, Massachusetts (1919 and 1924)
- Parochial school, St. Aloysius, Indian Orchard, Springfield, Massachusetts (1922–24)
- Parochial school, St. Casimir, Worcester, Massachusetts (1922–24)
- Parochial school, St. Mary of the Assumption, Milford, Massachusetts (1923)
- Parochial school and convent, St. Stephen, Worcester, Massachusetts (1923)
- Parochial school annex, Holy Name, Springfield, Massachusetts (1924–26)
- Parochial school, Our Lady of Jasna Gora, Clinton, Massachusetts (1925)
- Parochial school, Our Lady of the Annunciation, Florence, Massachusetts (1925)
- Parochial school, Sacred Heart, Springfield, Massachusetts (1925, demolished)
- Parochial school, St. Leo, Leominster, Massachusetts (1925)
- Parochial high school, St. Bernard, Fitchburg, Massachusetts (1926–27)
- Parochial school, St. Joan of Arc, Chicopee, Massachusetts (1926–27)
- Parochial school, St. Paul, Blackstone, Massachusetts (1927)
- Rectory, All Souls, Springfield, Massachusetts (1928–29)
- Parochial school, Holy Trinity, Greenfield, Massachusetts (1929–30, demolished 2015)
- Rectory, Our Lady of Vilna, Worcester, Massachusetts (1929)
- Convent, St. Leo, Leominster, Massachusetts (1930)

=== Institutions ===
- Various buildings, Mercy Medical Center, Springfield, Massachusetts (1898-99 et seq.)
- St. Luke's Home, Springfield, Massachusetts (1915 and 1926)
- Nurses' Home, Saint Vincent Hospital (former campus), Worcester, Massachusetts (1923)
- St. Luke's Hospital (former), Pittsfield, Massachusetts (1923–26, NRHP 1987)
- O'Leary Hall, College of Our Lady of the Elms, Chicopee, Massachusetts (1924)
- Main Building, La Salle Academy, Providence, Rhode Island (1925)
- Berchmans Hall, College of Our Lady of the Elms, Chicopee, Massachusetts (1929–32)
- Sisters of Providence Motherhouse, Holyoke, Massachusetts (1931)

=== Secular ===
- Indian Orchard Branch Library, Indian Orchard, Springfield, Massachusetts (1908–09, NRHP 1999)
- Lenox High School (former), Lenox, Massachusetts (1908–09, NRHP 2004)

== Gallery of architectural works ==
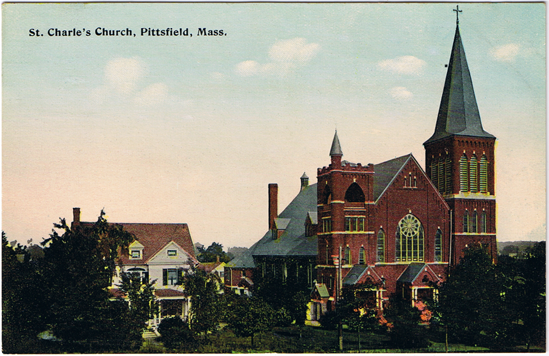
St. Charles R. C. Church, Pittsfield, Massachusetts, 1894-1901.

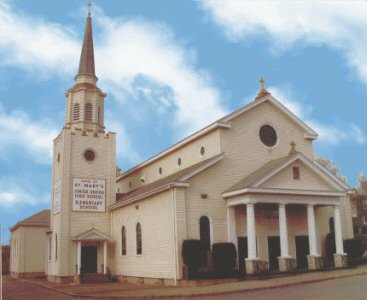
Our Lady of Czestochowa R. C. Church, Worcester, Massachusetts, 1904-06.

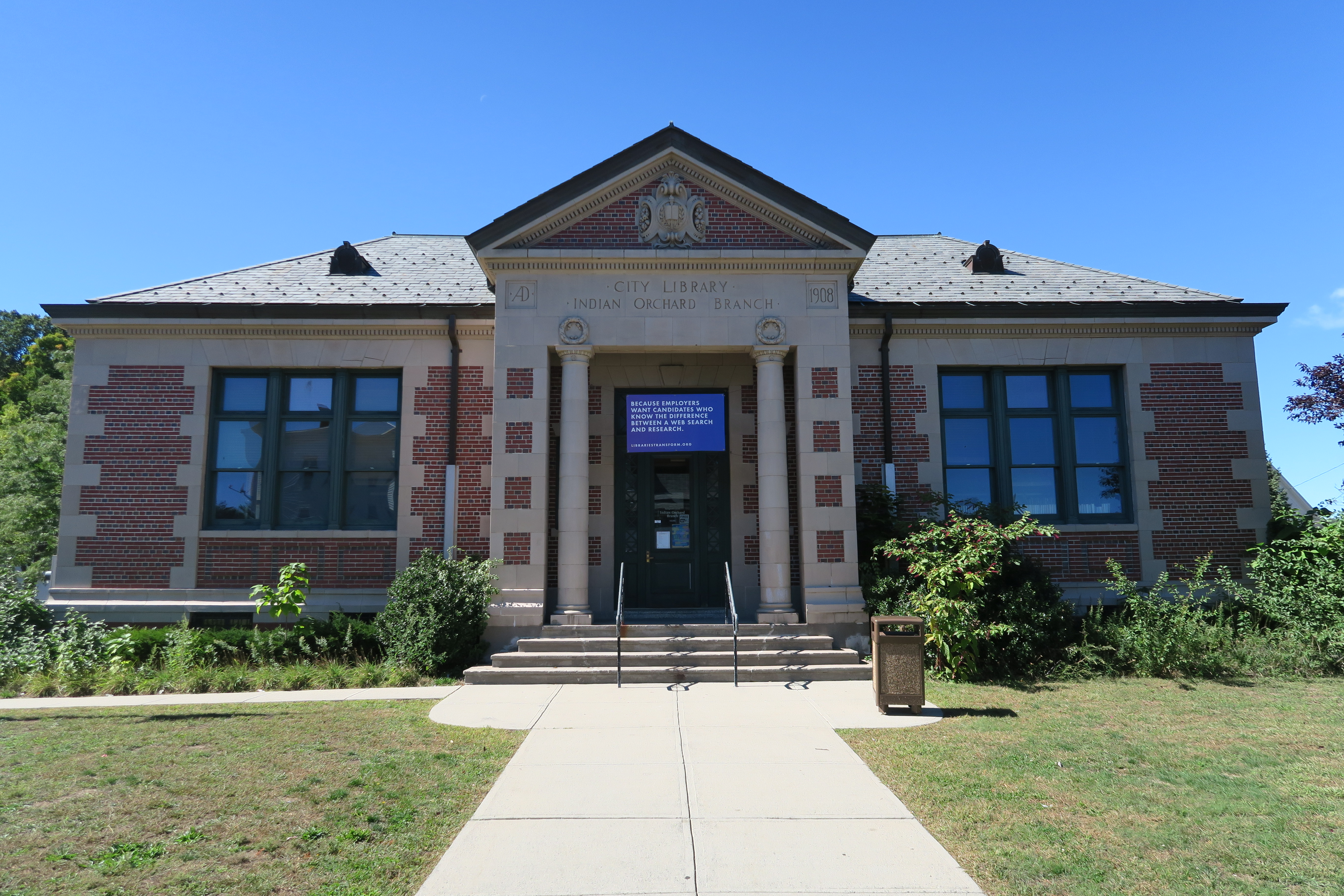
Indian Orchard Branch Library, Indian Orchard, Springfield, Massachusetts, 1908-09.

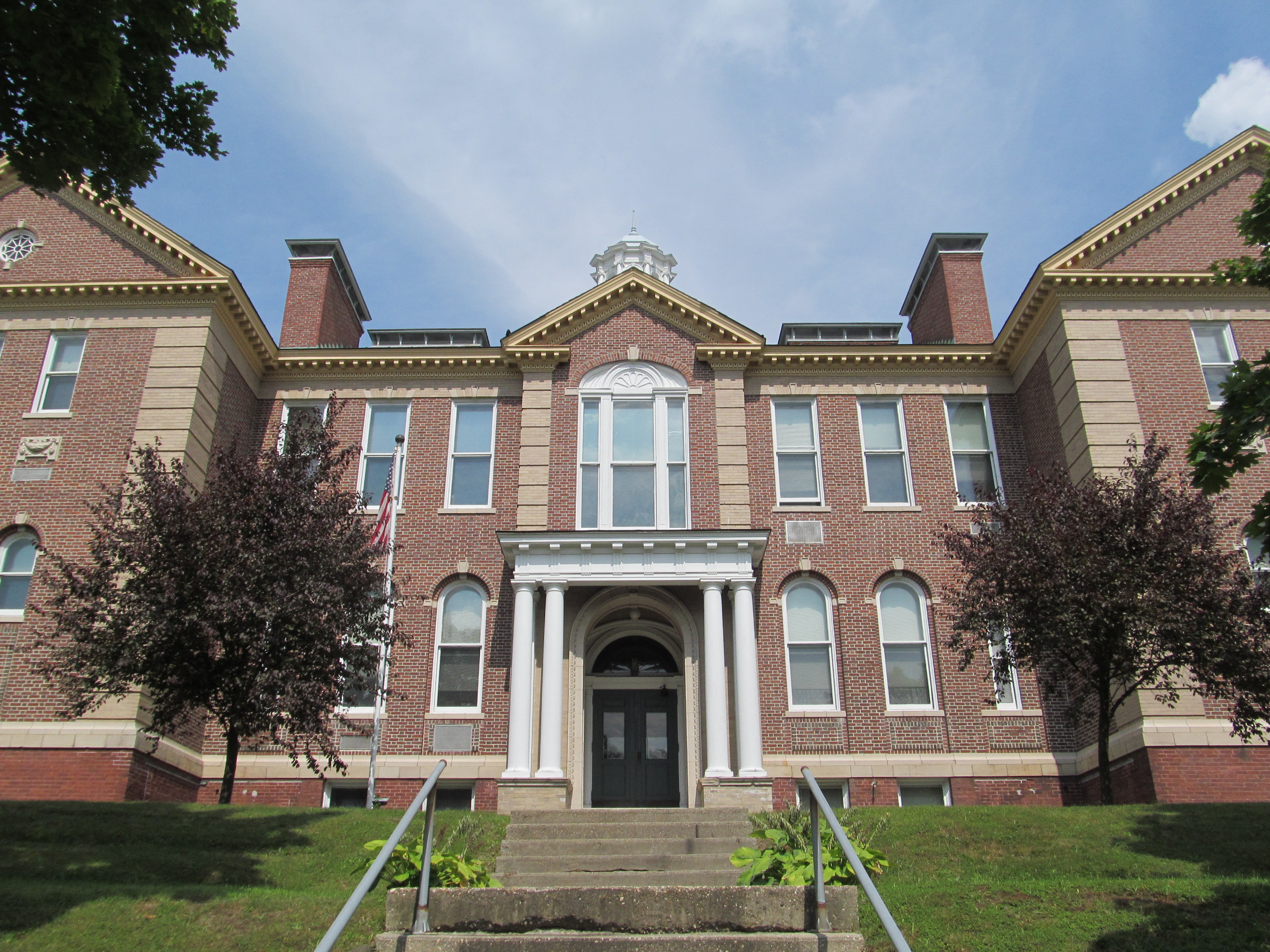
Lenox High School, Lenox, Massachusetts, 1908-09.

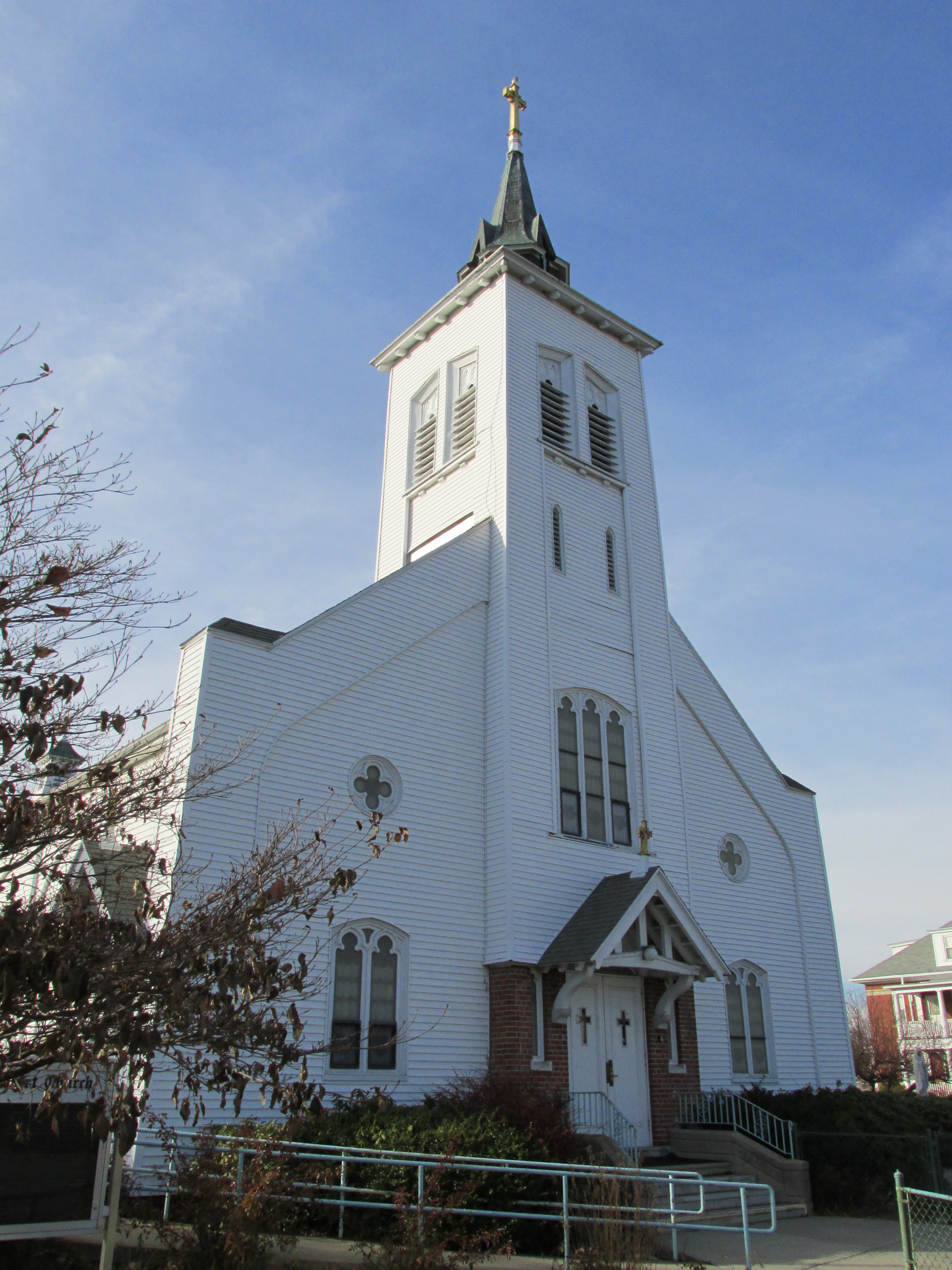
Sacred Heart of Jesus, Easthampton, Massachusetts, 1909.

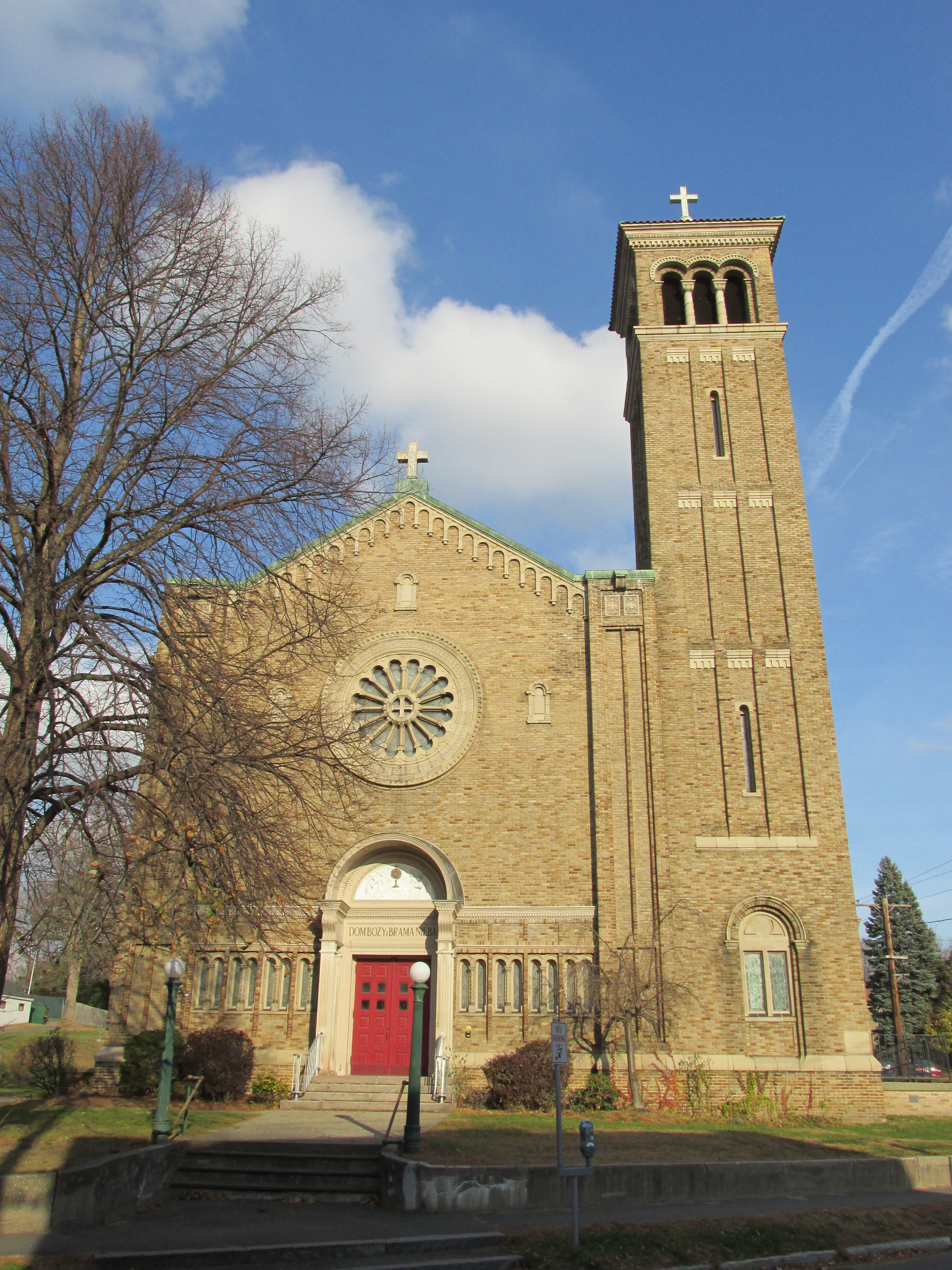
St. John Cantius R. C. Church, Northampton, Massachusetts, 1911-13.

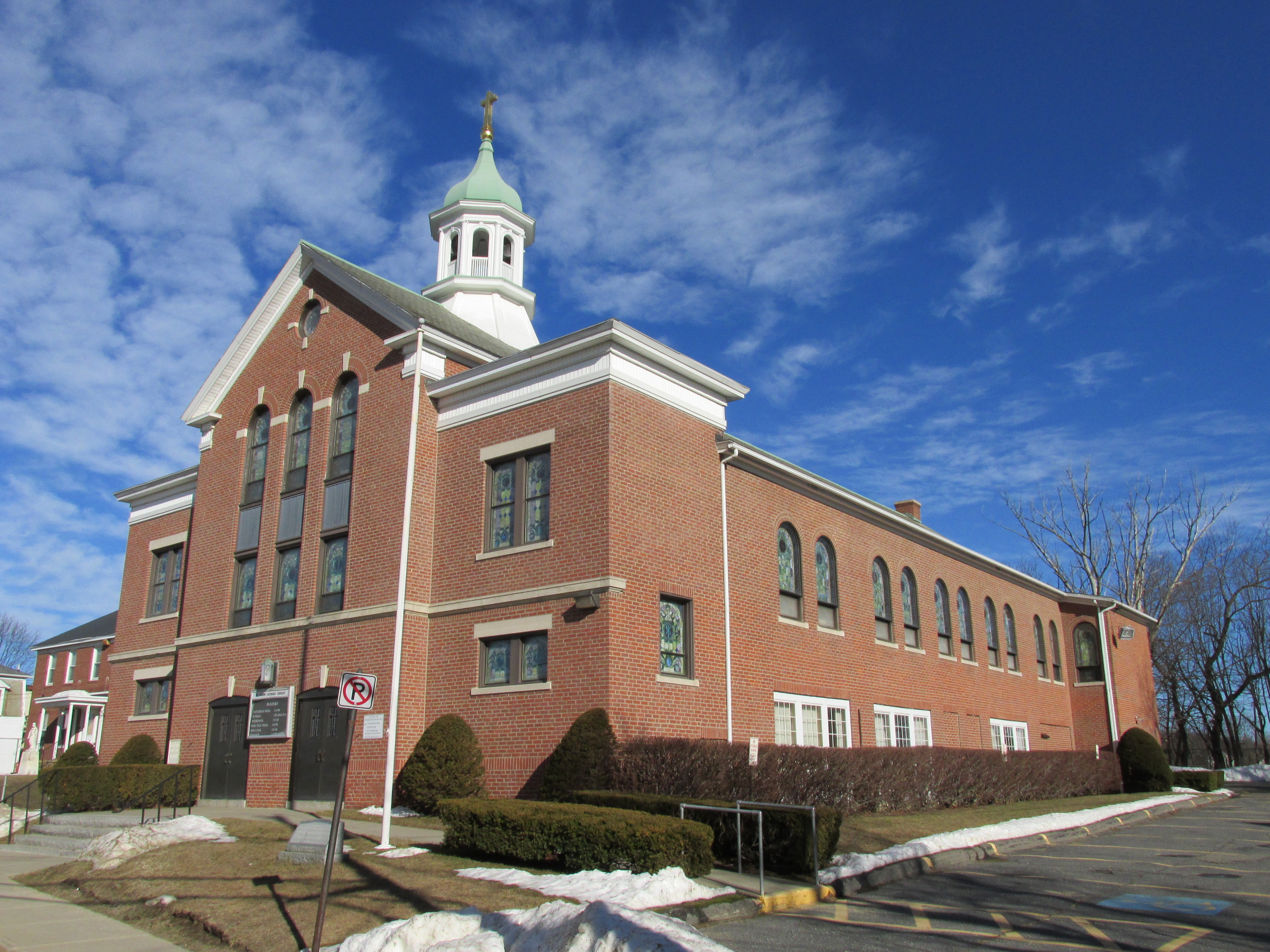
St. Joseph R. C. Church, Gardner, Massachusetts, 1912-13.

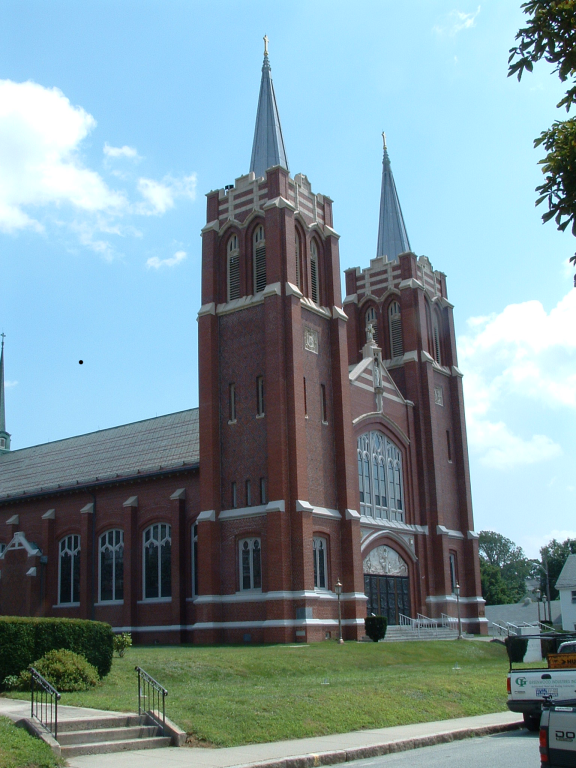
R. C. Basilica of St. Joseph, Webster, Massachusetts, 1913-14.

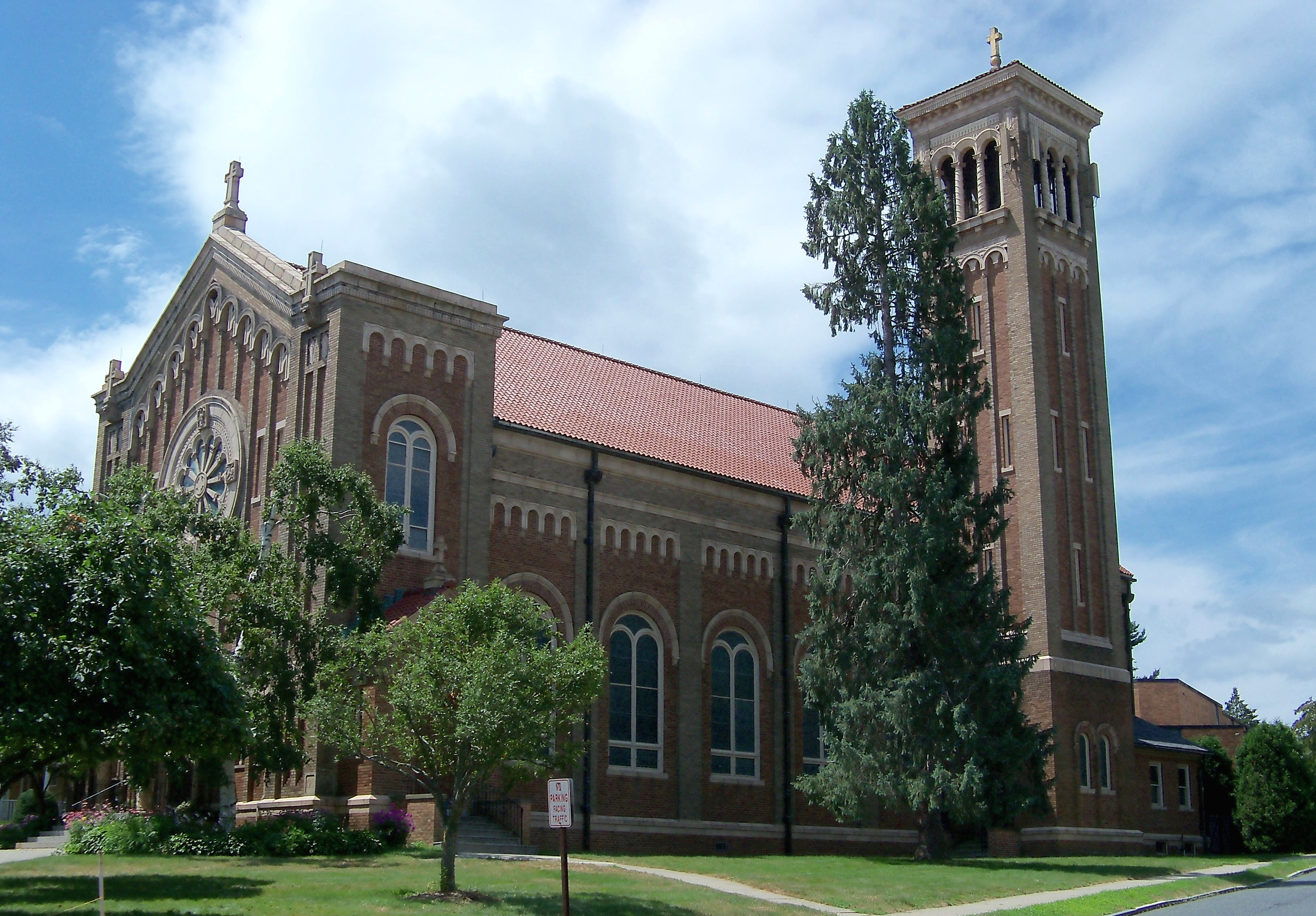
St. Brigid R. C. Church, Amherst, Massachusetts, 1923-24.

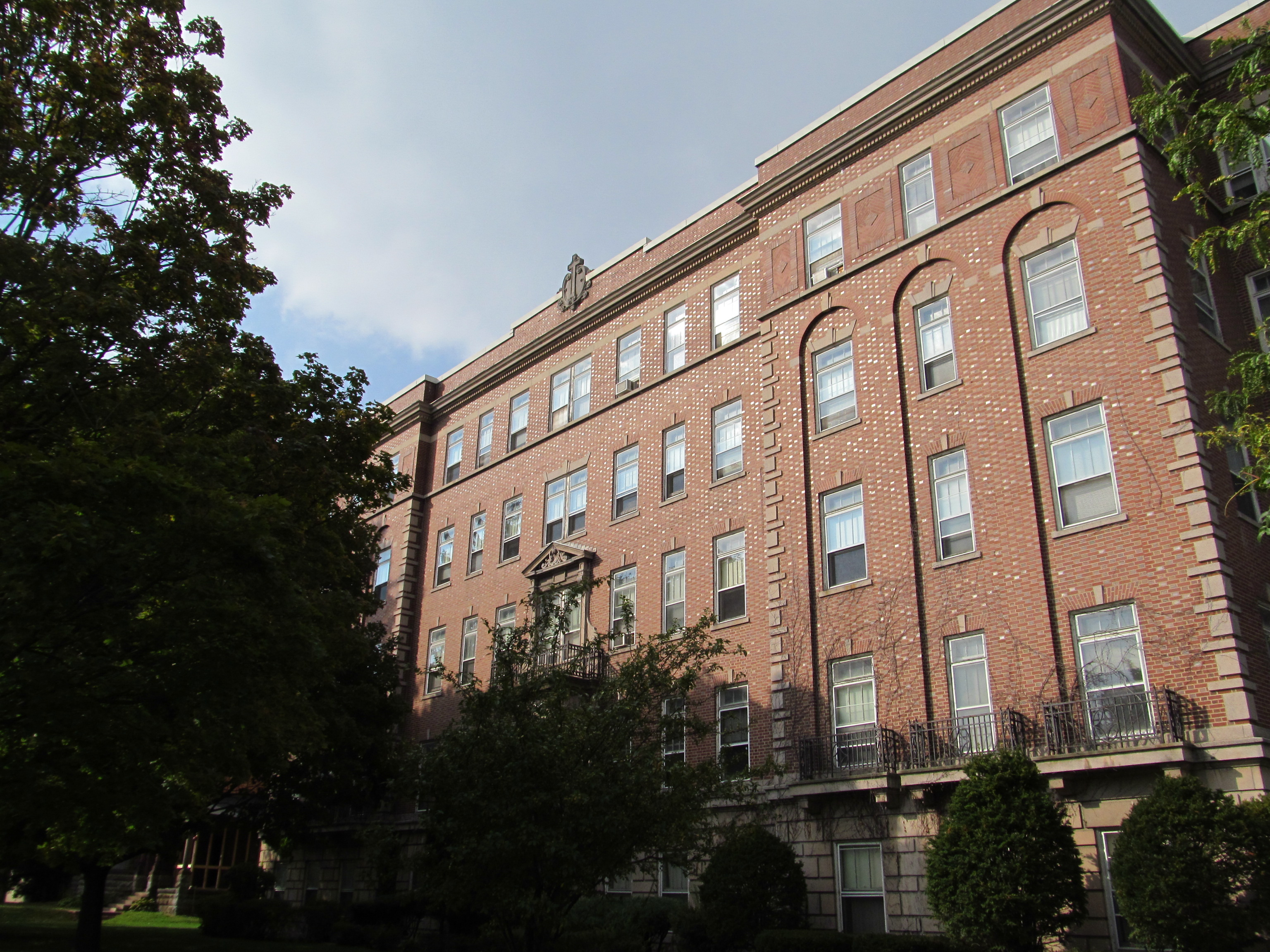
St. Luke's Hospital, Pittsfield, Massachusetts, 1923-26.

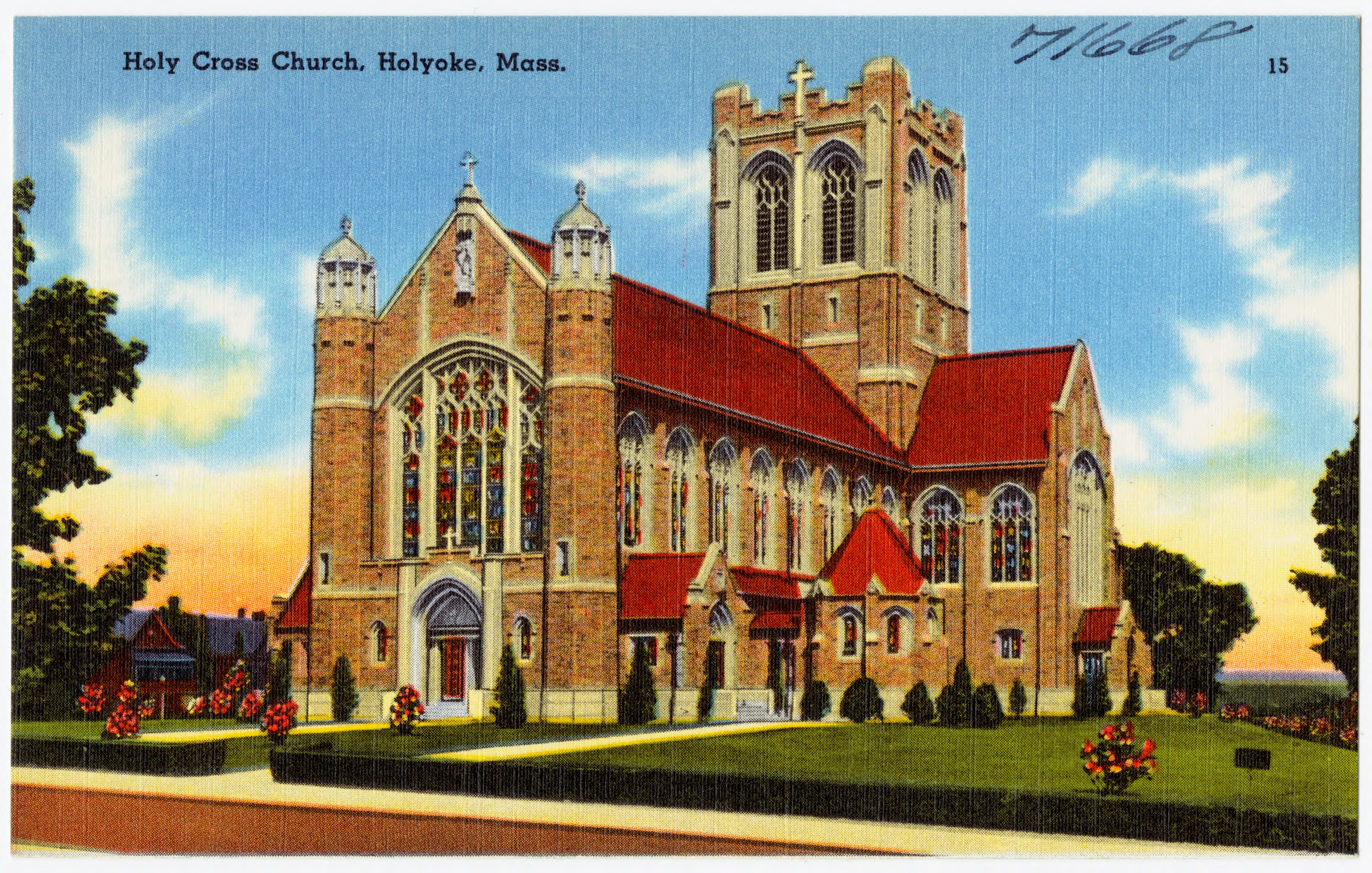
Holy Cross R. C. Church, Holyoke, Massachusetts, 1925-27.

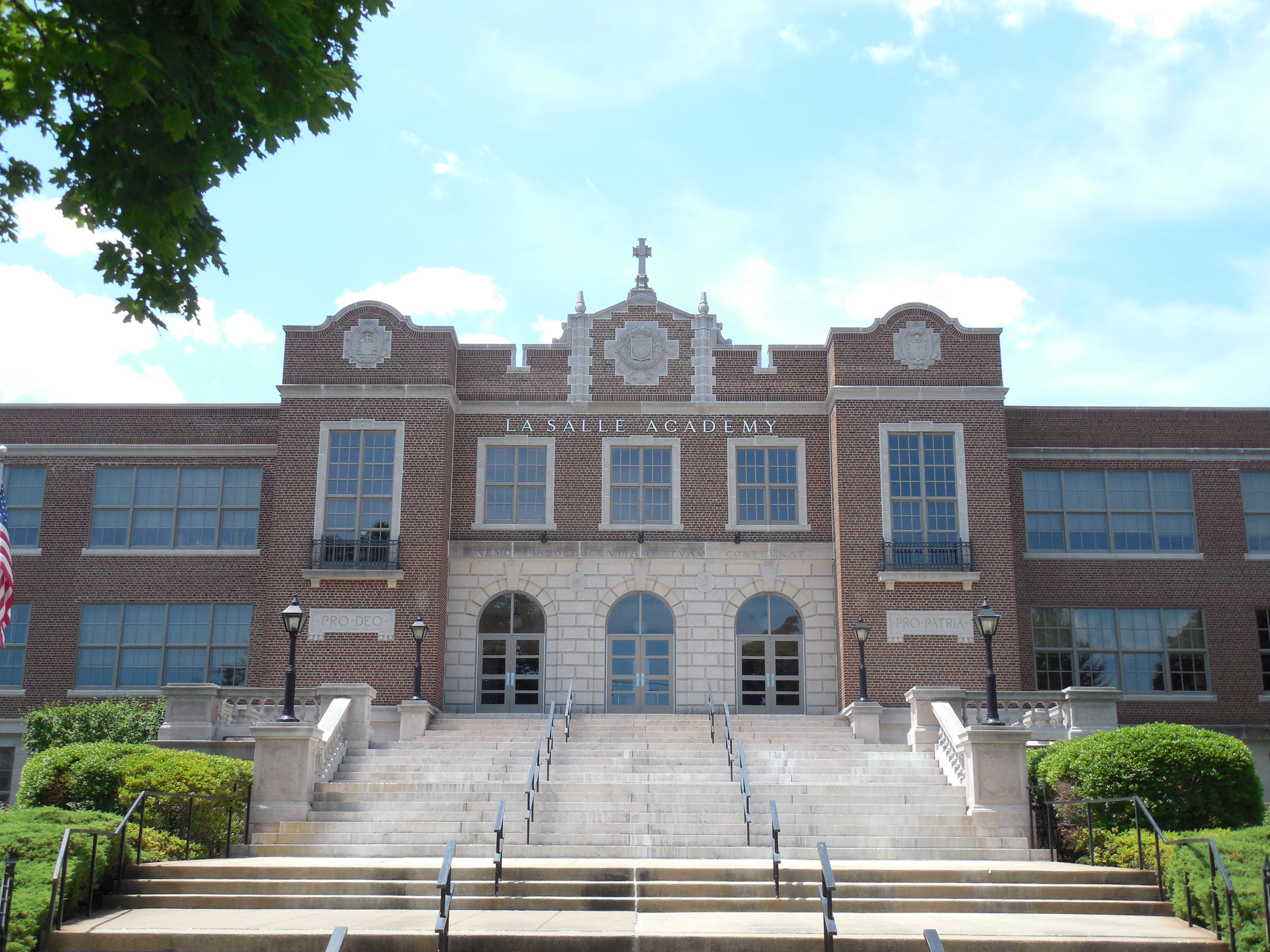
Main Building, La Salle Academy, Providence, Rhode Island, 1925.

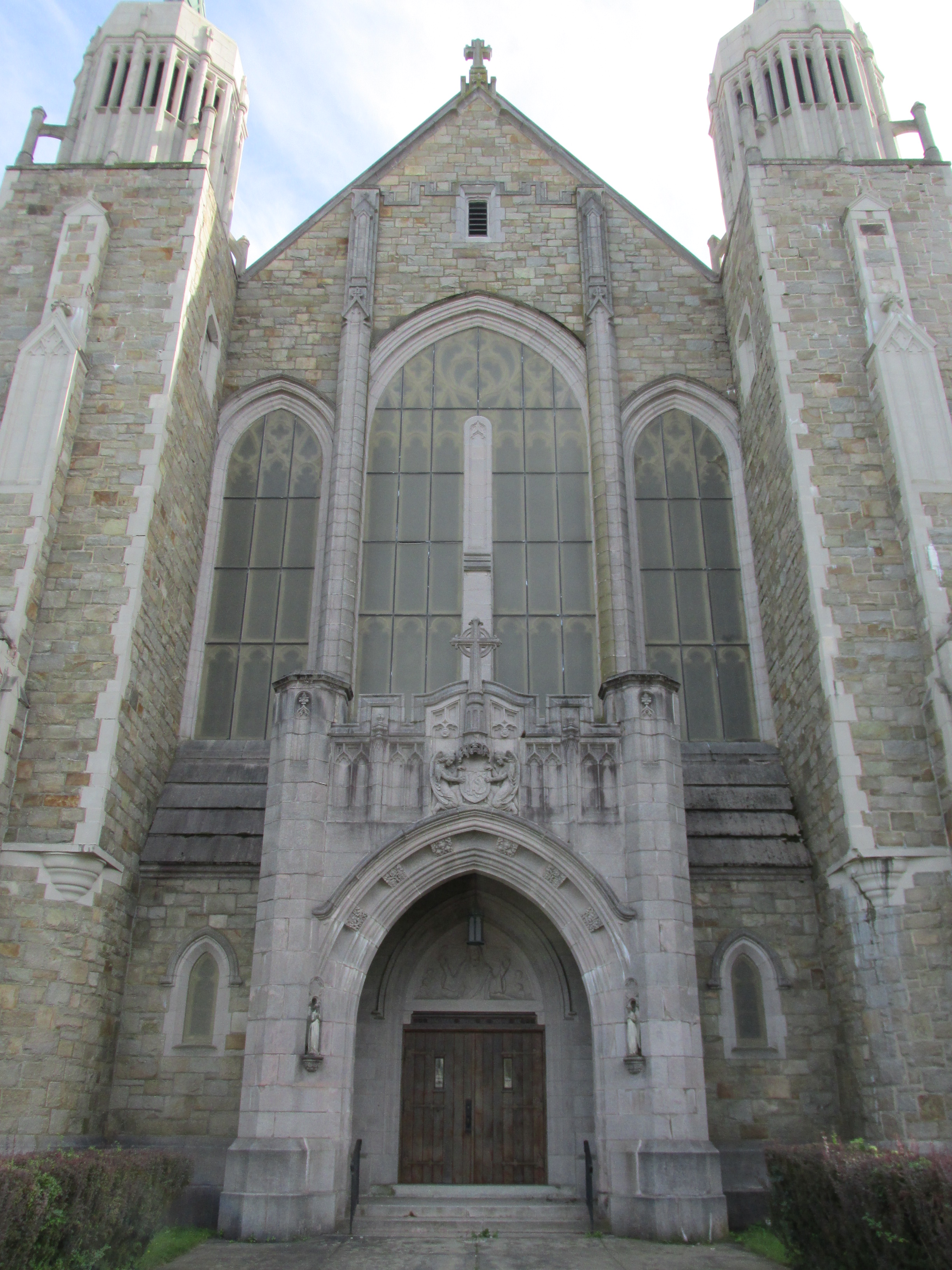
Sacred Heart R. C. Church, Southbridge, Massachusetts, 1926.

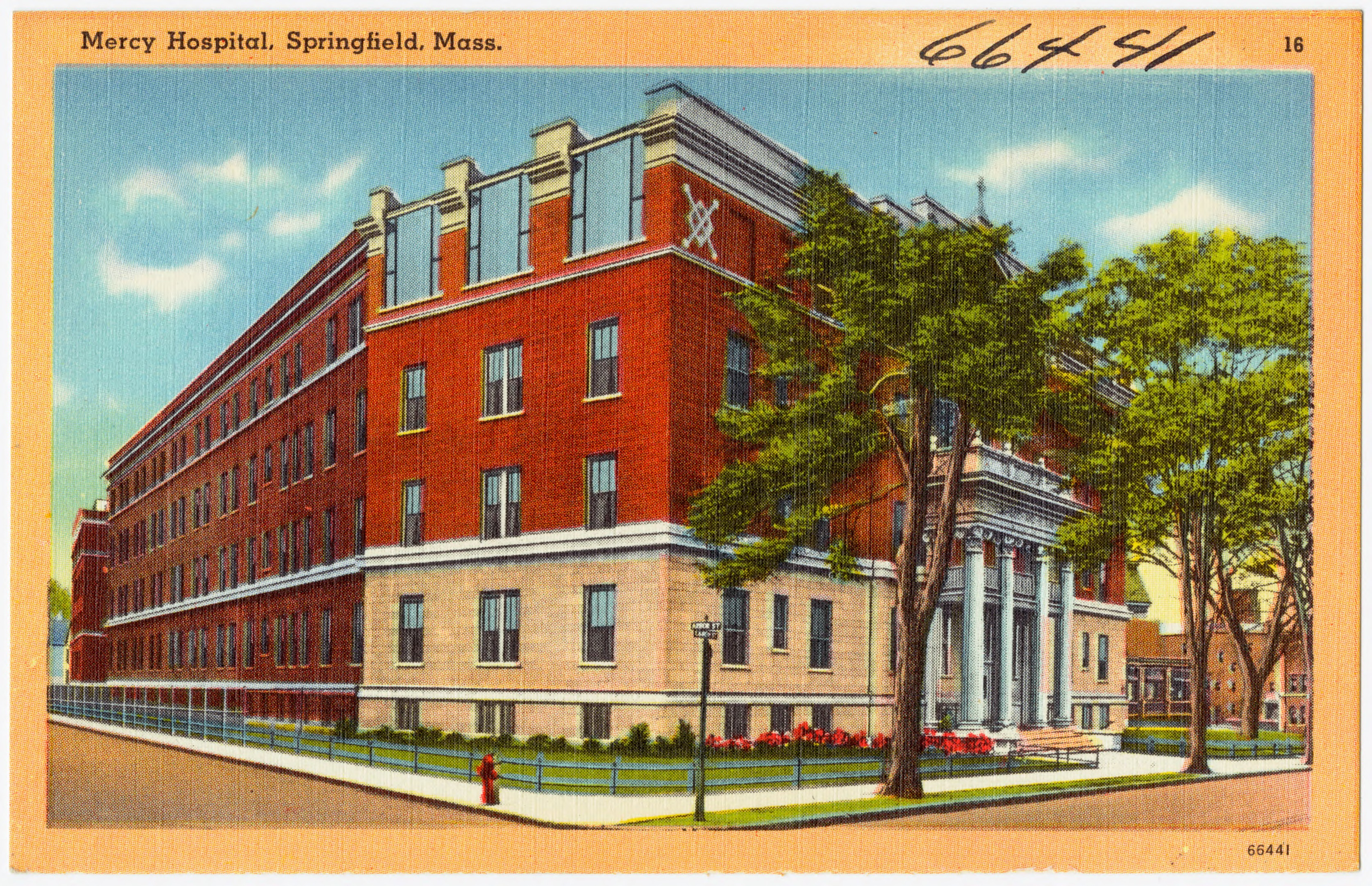
Weldon Rehabilitation Hospital, Mercy Medical Center, Springfield, Massachusetts, 1927.

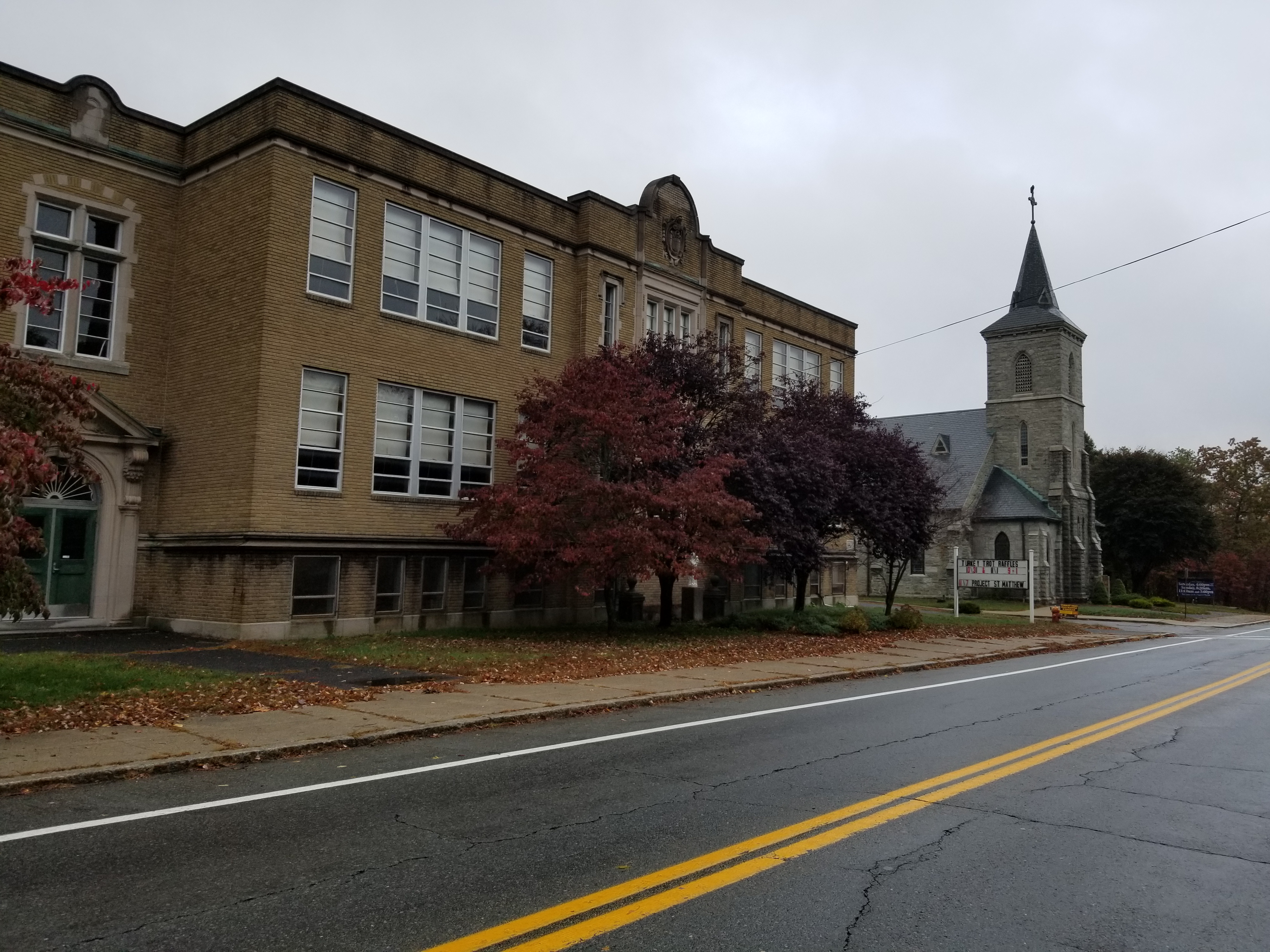
Parochial school, St. Paul R. C. Church, Blackstone, Massachusetts, 1927.

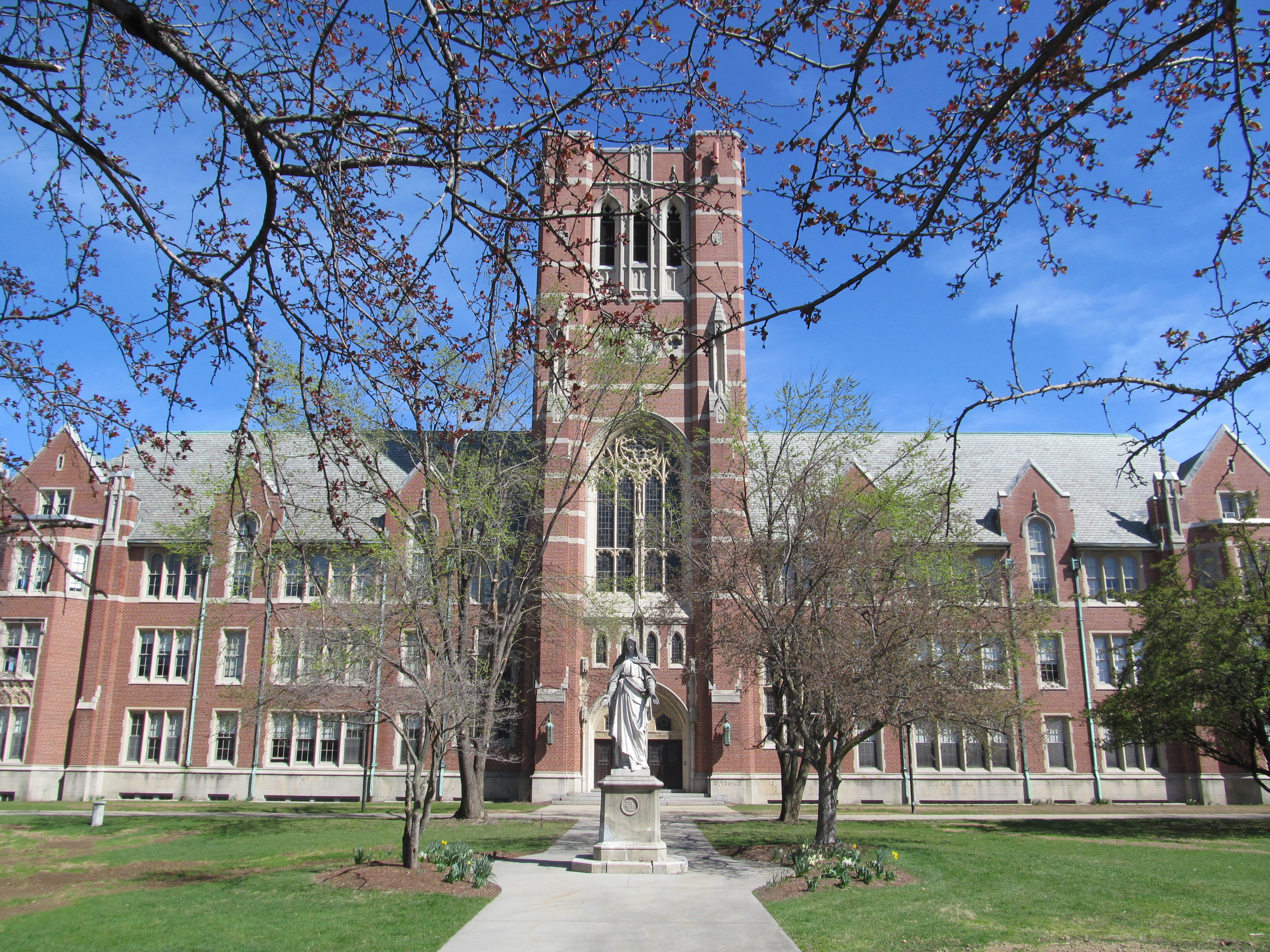
Berchmans Hall, College of Our Lady of the Elms, Chicopee, Massachusetts, 1929-32.
