= Indian Orchard =

Indian Orchard may refer to:

- Indian Orchard, Springfield, Massachusetts, a neighborhood in Springfield, Massachusetts
- Indian Orchard, a village in Texas Township, Pennsylvania
- The Indian Orchard Branch Library, a historic landmark in Indian Orchard, Massachusetts
