= Old Lee High School =

Lee High School
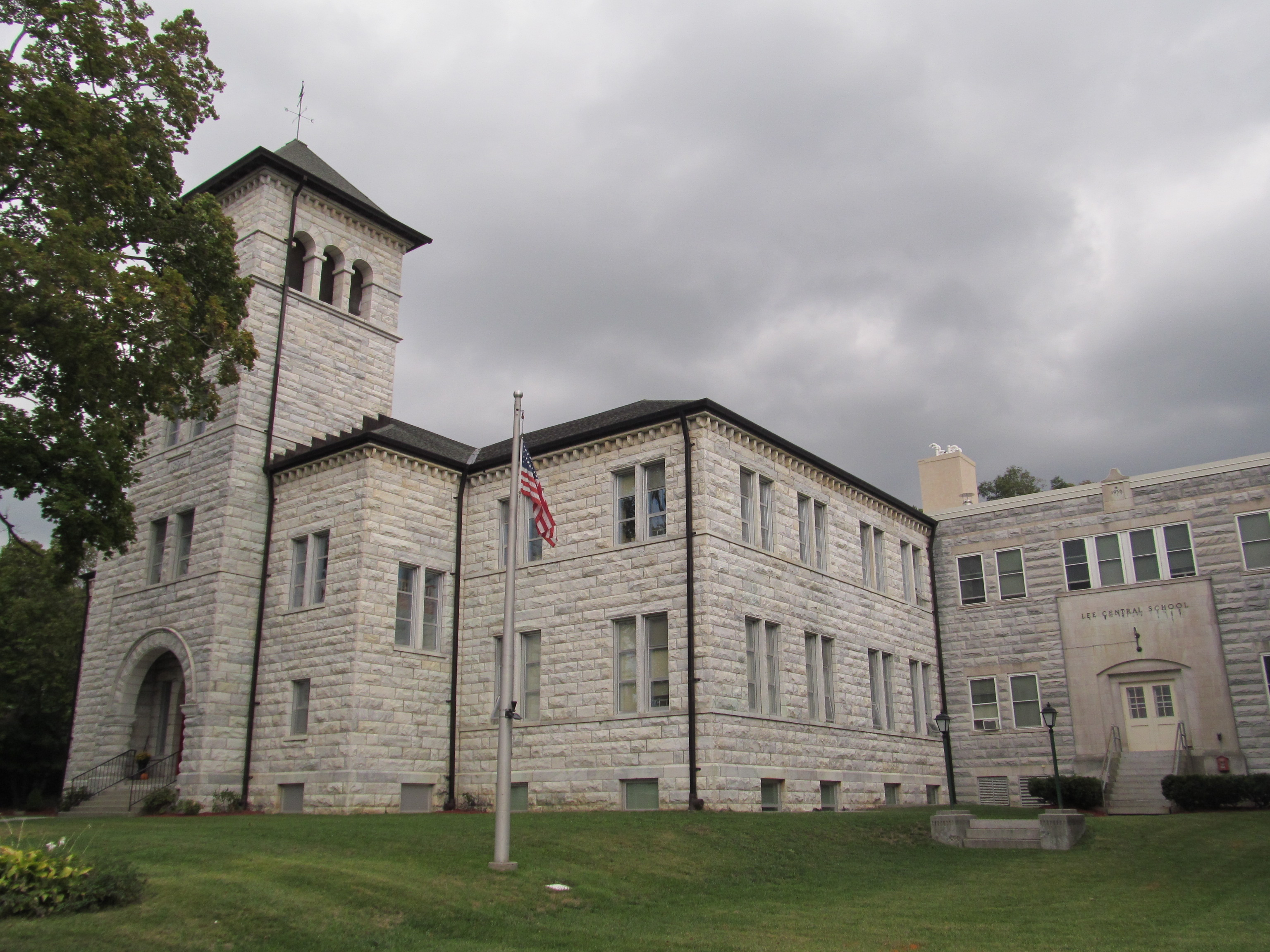
- Site of Lee High School (1894–1916)

Location
- 300 Greylock Street; Lee, Massachusetts 01238; United States; 42°18′24.27″N 73°14′23.70″W

Information
- Type: public secondary school
- Established: 1851; 175 years ago
- School district: Lee Public School District
- Principal: Gregg Brighenti
- Staff: 36.20 (FTE)
- Grades: 7-12
- Gender: coeducational
- Enrollment: 308 (2023-2024)
- Student to teacher ratio: 8.51
- Campus: small town, rural
- Colors: Black & Orange
- Athletics: Berkshire County League
- Nickname: Wildcats
- Newspaper: ‘’Wildcat Newsletter’' (online)
- Yearbook: The Echo
- Website: Lee High School Website

Lee High School is a public high school in Lee, Massachusetts, United States. The school was founded in 1851 and serves students in grades nine through twelve from Lee and the nearby town of Tyringham. Students from neighboring Otis, Sandisfield and Becket. also have the option to attend Lee High School. Through its history and as the student population has increased, the school has transitioned through different buildings and locations. Today it shares a campus with the town's middle school. The schools are officially known as Lee Middle and High School.

== History ==
Lee High School was founded in 1851, marking the beginning of public secondary education in the town. Prior to that and like in many New England villages, education beyond fundamental literacy, arithmetic and civics was provided by private academies to the children of families that could afford additional schooling. Through the years the high school occupied buildings at several locations, The impressive Hyde School was built for the high school in 1894 in the Romanesque Revival style. It still stands at 100 High Street as one of Lee's landmark buildings. In 1916 that building became home to Lee Central School, when the high school moved to another site. In 1962 Lee High School's current campus was established at 300 Greylock Street. In the 2002–2003 school year, the High School moved to a shared campus with the Middle school.

== Academics ==
A general secondary curriculum is provided with vocational and college preparatory course offerings. In addition to the general curriculum, several enrichment and recognition programs are offered, including:

- Advanced Placement classes
- National Merit Scholarships
- Academic Decathlon

Students participate in Mock Trial, sponsored by the Massachusetts Bar Association and in the TV program As Schools Match Wits. In 2016 sixty students were in the graduating class. Eighty-three scholarships, most of which are locally generated, were awarded to graduating seniors. Seventeen members of the Class of 2016 received John and Abigail Adams Scholarships by the Commonwealth of Massachusetts.

== Student life ==
In spite of the school's small size, numerous extracurricular activities are offered.

=== Publications ===
- Wildcat Newsletter, online newspaper
- The Echo, (formerly Ferncliff Echo) yearbook
- Orange Ink

=== Activities ===
- Student Council
- National Honor Society
- Helping Hands
- Band and Chamber Ensemble
- Drama Program with Shakespeare & Company
- Spring Concert
- Annual Talent Show
- Quiz Team
- Career Fair

== Athletics ==
The school's teams are known as the ‘Wildcats’. The school's colors are black and orange. The varsity and junior varsity teams participate in the Berkshire County League. Their traditional rivals include neighboring Lenox Memorial High School, Monument Mountain Regional High School and Pittsfield High School. By season, the varsity sports teams are:

- Fall
  - Cross country - boys & girls
  - Football - boys
  - Golf - boys
  - Soccer - girls
  - Volleyball - girls
- Winter
  - Basketball - boys & girls
  - Ice Hockey - boys
  - Alpine Skiing - boys & girls
  - Swimming - girls
- Spring
  - Baseball - boys
  - Lacrosse - boys & girls
  - Outdoor Track - boys & girls
  - Softball - girls
  - Tennis - boys & girls

In the fall of 2015 the boys’ football and golf teams won the Western Massachusetts championships. In 2019, the football team won the Western Massachusetts Championship again. The boys’ cross country team won the southern division of the Berkshire County League. The girls’ volleyball team was the undefeated champion of Berkshire County. Also, students participate in cooperative teams from neighboring schools in hockey, skiing, and swimming. During the 2015–2016 school year, 330 students from the Middle and High School participated in team sports.

== District consolidation reconsidered ==
Lee High School could be impacted by renewed discussions of school district consolidation. Beginning in the early 1950s, Massachusetts began to encourage and financially incentivize small school districts to consider consolidating with neighboring districts to ensure fiscal sustainability and to strengthen curricular offerings through economies of scale. Nearby Berkshire County communities like Stockbridge, Great Barrington and Dalton choose consolidation, which led to the closure of their local high schools, which were replaced with larger regional high schools. Lee and nearby Lenox considered consolidation but resisted such a move. Short of consolidation, Lee and Lenox eventually partnered to share several non-academic support systems. Over the decades student enrollment figures have continued to decline in most Berkshire County school districts, including in Lee. Once again Lee is engaged in considering full consolidation with Lenox. Beyond the needs of these two towns, there have been calls for broader regionalization of school districts in the southern portion of the county or even for county-wide district consolidation.
