= Lenox Memorial High School (Massachusetts) =

Public school in Lenox, Massachusetts, United States

Location
- 197 East Street; Lenox, (Berkshire County), Massachusetts 01240; United States; 42°21′07.49″N 73°15′31.86″W

Information
- Type: Public; Coeducational; Open enrollment
- Established: 1803
- School district: Lenox Public Schools
- Dean: Brian Cogswell
- Principal: Jeremiah Ames
- Teaching staff: 51.91(FTE)
- Grades: 6–12
- Student to teacher ratio: 8.59
- Campus type: Suburban
- Colors: Maroon and Gold
- Athletics conference: Berkshire County League
- Team name: Millionaires
- Rival: Lee High School
- Accreditation: New England Association of Schools and Colleges
- Publication: Cacophony & Murmur
- Newspaper: Lenox Dispatch
- Yearbook: Xonel
- Website: lmmhs.lenoxps.org/o/lmhs

Lenox Memorial High School is a public high school located in Lenox, Massachusetts, United States, founded in 1803. Since 1966 it has shared a campus with the town's middle school. The schools are officially known as Lenox Memorial Middle and High School.

== History ==
The first school master arrived in Lenox in 1770. Lenox Memorial High School has its origins in the founding of Lenox Academy in 1803. Acquiring a reputation for excellence, the Academy drew students from throughout the region and beyond. Already serving as the town's secondary school, the Academy officially became its public high school in 1866. Lenox responded to its growing student population with the construction of the 1908 school building which served as the high school until 1966. In that year a new campus was opened on the eastern edge of the town that co-located the high school and middle school.

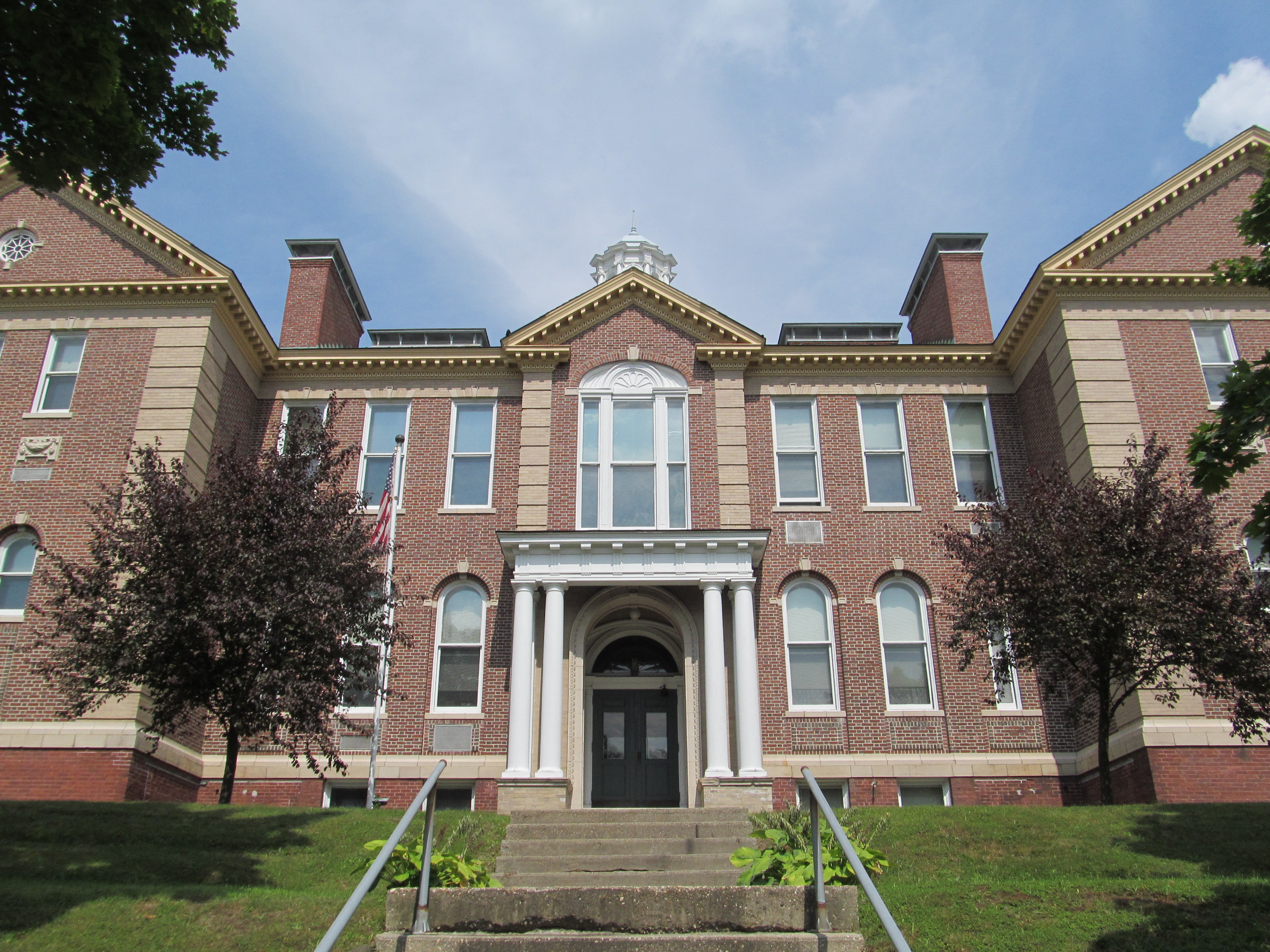
Old Lenox High School, 1908 building

== Academics ==
The school's academic departments include English, Math, Science & Technology, Social Studies, World Languages, Health & Wellness, Studio Art/Music/Wood, and Drama. There are also Special Education, Guidance, and ESL services. Vocational education is not offered however, a tuition agreement with the Pittsfield Public Schools allows Lenox students to enroll in the vocational programs at either Pittsfield High School or Taconic High School.

By meeting eligibility requirements, students are able to enroll in free college courses at Berkshire Community College. An independent study option is also available.

Despite the small size, there are numerous Advanced Placement courses offered including Spanish, French, Latin, Environmental Science, Physics, Calculus (AB and BC), Statistics, English, and Studio Art.

Lenox Memorial has been awarded a Gold medal by U.S. News & World Report each year since 2016. It consistently ranks among the top 20 public high schools in Massachusetts.

== Student life ==
The LMMHS campus includes a library, wood shop, film developing studio, greenhouse, and the Duffin Theater. Numerous after school clubs and activities are offered.

Lenox has strong Visual Arts and Theater departments. The school participates in the Fall Festival of Shakespeare at Shakespeare & Company, as well as producing a musical in the spring.

=== Publications ===
There are three publications, including a newspaper, yearbook and literary magazine.

- Lenox Dispatch, newspaper
- Xonel, yearbook
- Cacophony & Murmur, 9th grade literary magazine

=== Clubs & Activities ===
Many of the clubs and activities are initiated and sustained through student interest. Among them are:

- Active Minds
- Art
- Band
- Drama
- Improv
- Investment Club
- A Capella
- Robotics
- Quiz Team
- Math
- Chess
- Mock Trial
- Model UN
- Student Voices for Empowerment
- Gender Alliance
- Peer Mentoring
- Evergreen
- French Ciné

== Athletics ==
A member of the Berkshire County League under the MIAA, Lenox sports teams are known as the Millionaires in recognition of the town's prominence as a summer colony for some of the country's wealthiest families during the Gilded Age of the late 1800s. However, many students have expressed dismay with the "Millionaires" moniker, arguing that it promotes an elitist and revisionist version of the town's history. Numerous efforts to change the sports teams' name have been unsuccessful. The school's colors are maroon and gold. The chief rival are the Wildcats of Lee High School, in the nearby town of Lee. A rivalry has developed over the years with the Mounties of Mt. Greylock High School in Williamstown for both boys and girls cross country running and skiing.

Fall sports include soccer, cross country running, volleyball, football, crew, and golf. Winter sports include alpine and Nordic skiing, basketball, hockey, and swimming. In the spring the sports offered are tennis, baseball, softball, crew, track & field, and lacrosse. A wider variety of sports are made possible through partnerships with other high schools. These co-ops include hockey with Taconic High School, swimming with Monument Mountain Regional High School in Great Barrington, and football with Lee High School.

The Millionaires have a history of success in athletics across the board, particularly in cross country running, soccer, and skiing. The boys Nordic program has won 8 Massachusetts state titles while the girls have won 15 – most recently in 2020.

== Rejection of regionalization ==
Beginning in the 1950s and 1960s, due to projected declines in student populations and more affordable economies of scale, Massachusetts officials began to encouraged smaller school districts to consolidating into regionalized districts with neighboring towns. Lenox held several votes on consolidating with nearby districts in Lee and Stockbridge. Stockbridge eventually chose to consolidate with Great Barrington, but Lenox and Lee have maintained their independent districts.

== Notable alumni ==
- John Gervasi - Featured on episode 2 season 2 of Married to Real Estate
