= Old Lenox High School building =

- Lenox High School
- U.S. National Register of Historic Places
- U.S. Historic district – Contributing property
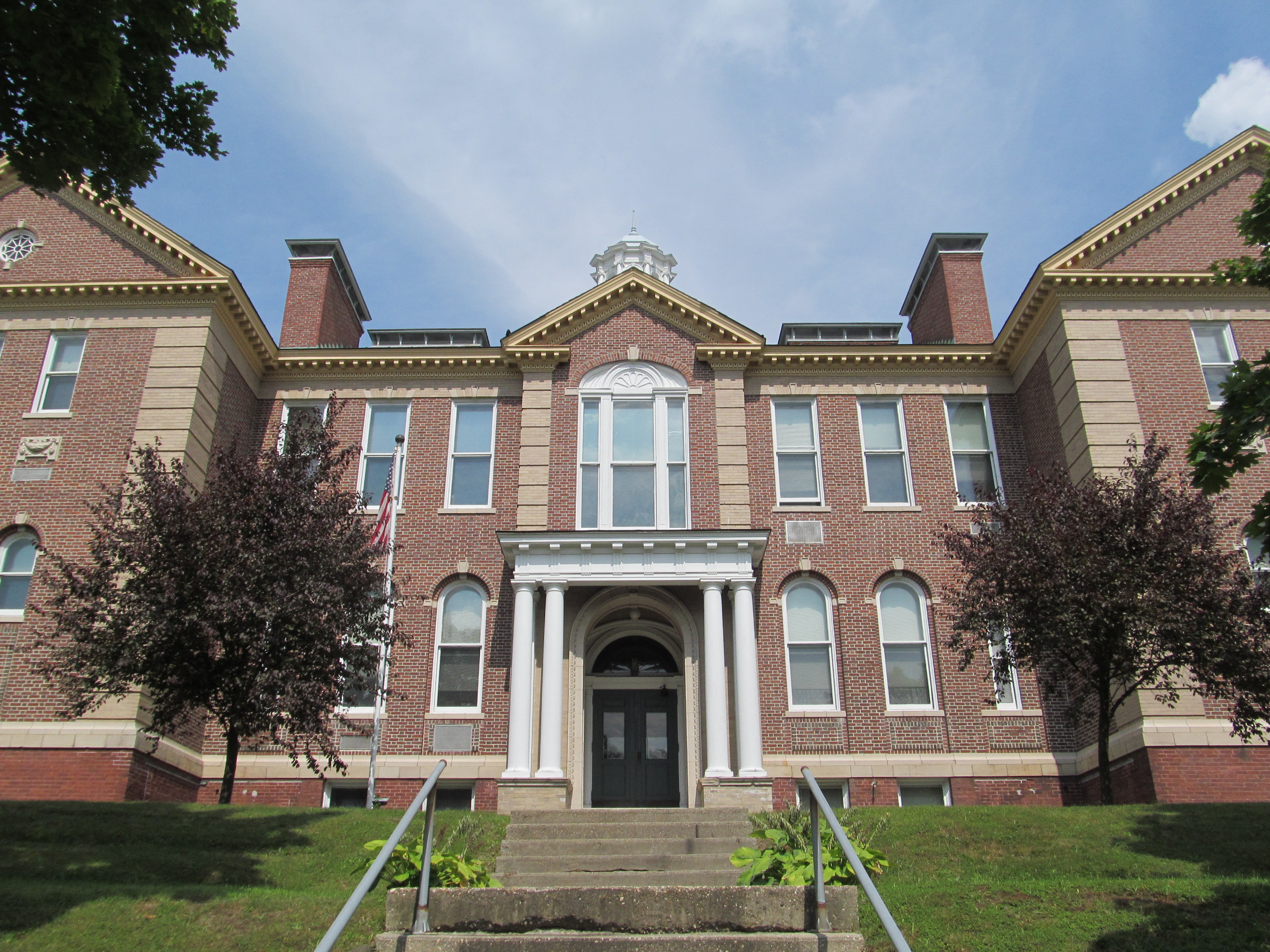

- Location within Massachusetts Location within the United States
- Location: 109 Housatonic St., Lenox, Massachusetts
- Coordinates: 42°21′21″N 73°16′44″W
- Area: 3.8 acres (1.5 ha)
- Built: 1908
- Architect: John W. Donohue
- Architectural style: Colonial Revival, Italian Villa
- Part of: Lenox Village Historic District (ID100006987)
- NRHP reference No.: 04000903

Significant dates
- Added to NRHP: August 25, 2004
- Designated CP: June 27, 2022

The Old Lenox High School building, also formerly known as the Lenox Elementary School and the Marguerite E. Cameron Elementary School, is a historic school building at 109 Housatonic Street in Lenox, Massachusetts. The building was constructed in 1908, and housed the town's high school until 1966, when Lenox Memorial High School opened. The building had been converted into an assisted living facility, and then converted again in 2017 into low-income-housing apartments for seniors - now known as Lenox Schoolhouse Apartments. The building was listed on the National Register of Historic Places in 2004.

== Description and history ==
The Old Lenox High School building is located east of downtown Lenox, on the north side of Housatonic Street at its western junction with High Street. It is a 2-1/2 story masonry structure, built out of red brick with terra cotta trim. It is a basically T-shaped building, with the top of the T serving as the main facade. It consists of a central horizontal main section, with flanking wings that project slightly, from which a long addition extends to the rear. The main entrance is at the center, sheltered by a rectangular portico with paired Doric columns and set recessed in a round-arch opening. Above the entrance is a tall three-part window, and the bay is crowned by a gable.

The school was built in 1908 to a design by John W. Donohue of Springfield, and is a good local example of large-scale Colonial Revival architecture. The school replaced the former Lenox Academy building, which had served as the town's public high school since 1869 (and as a private high school since the academy's founding in 1803). This building underwent major renovations and additions in the 1940s and 1960s. The building was then used as school facilities for grades 4 through 6 until the 1970s, when (known as the Cameron School) it began to serve grades 2 through 5. The school was closed in 1998.

After three years of vacancy, the building was repurposed for use as an assisted living facility. In 2017, the building was renovated into a 38-unit apartment community for seniors.

== Alumni ==
- Jennie Louise Touissant Welcome

== See also ==
- National Register of Historic Places listings in Berkshire County, Massachusetts
