= Providence Court =

- U.S. National Register of Historic Places
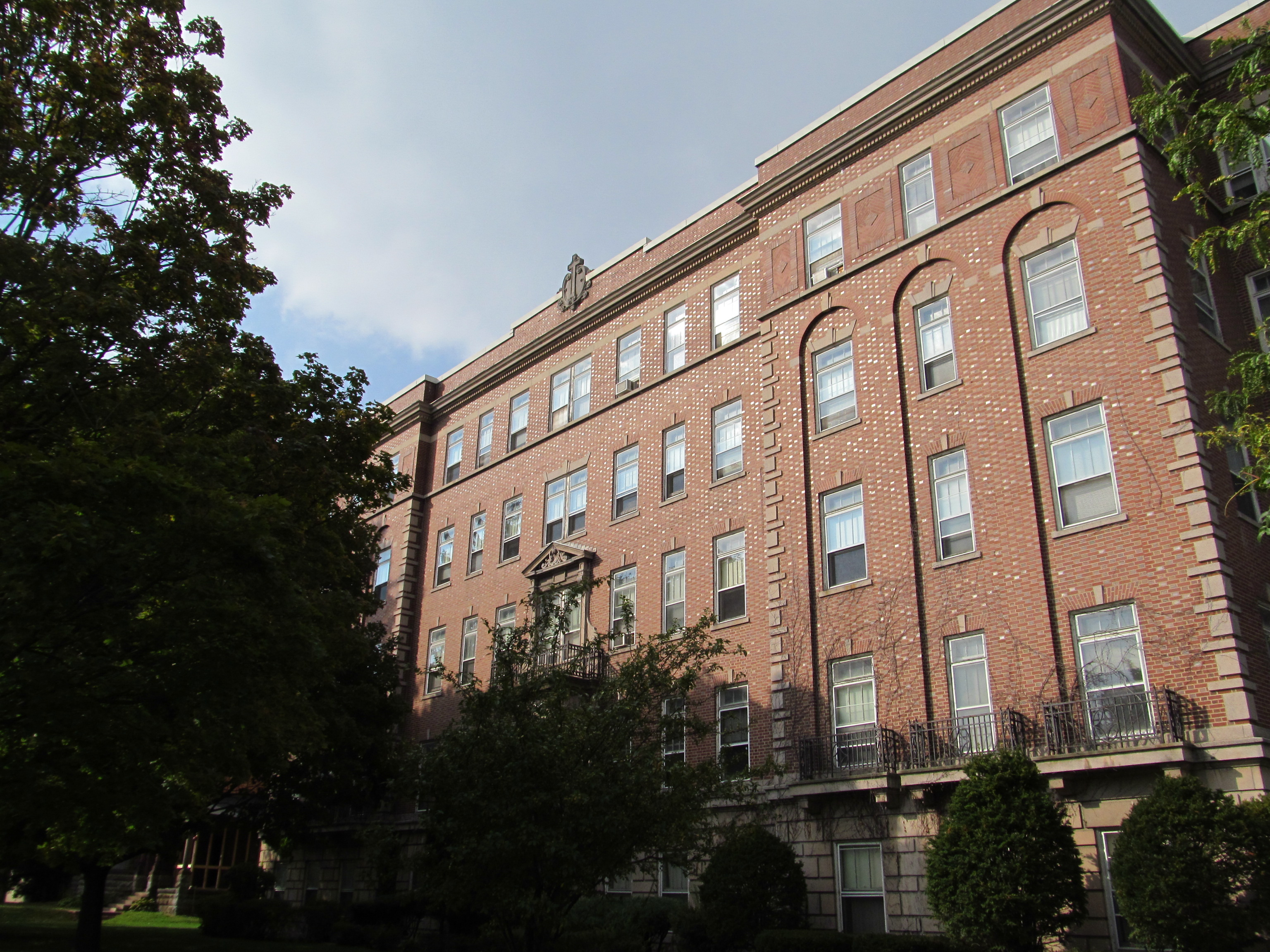
- Providence Court

- Location within Massachusetts Location within the United States
- Location: Pittsfield, Massachusetts
- Coordinates: 42°26′51″N 73°14′47″W
- Built: 1926
- Architect: John W. Donohue
- Architectural style: Colonial Revival, Other
- NRHP reference No.: 87001107
- Added to NRHP: November 20, 1987

Providence Court, previously St. Luke's Hospital, is a historic former hospital building at 379 East Street in Pittsfield, Massachusetts. The Colonial Revival building was constructed in 1926, and was the first Roman Catholic hospital in Berkshire County. St. Luke's merged with Pittsfield General Hospital in 1967 to form Berkshire Medical Center, in the nation's first mergers between religious and non-sectarian hospitals. The building was converted into elderly housing in 1978–1981. It was listed on the National Register of Historic Places in 1987.

== Description and history ==
Providence Court is located on the north side of East Street (Massachusetts Route 9), several blocks east of Pittsfield's central business district. It is a five-story brick and stone structure, in a T shape with a horizontal block at the front and a long projecting wing to the rear of the center. It is basically Colonial/Georgian Revival in character, with limestone trim that includes corner quoining, window sills and keystones, and belt courses. The ground floor, essentially a raised basement, is finished in rusticated limestone, while the upper floors are predominantly in brick. The main entrance, set between the first and second levels, is sheltered by a limestone portico with Tuscan columns.

The Roman Catholic Diocese of Springfield decided in 1916 to establish a hospital in Pittsfield, and dedicated a facility in two converted residences the following year. This space proving inadequate, the diocese purchased the Allen estate on East Street, and converted the estate house into a maternity ward. The present building was constructed on the grounds of the former Allen estate between 1923 and 1926, to design by ecclesiastical architect John W. Donohue of Springfield. It was operated as St. Luke's Hospital until 1967, when it was merged with Pittsfield General Hospital to form what is now known as Berkshire Medical Center. The Pittsfield General facility was enlarged in 1976, and this building was closed. It was purchased by the local housing authority in 1978, and has been converted into elderly housing.

== See also ==
- National Register of Historic Places listings in Berkshire County, Massachusetts
