= Sacred Heart Church Historic District (Southbridge, Massachusetts) =

Historic district in Massachusetts, United States

- U.S. National Register of Historic Places
- U.S. Historic district
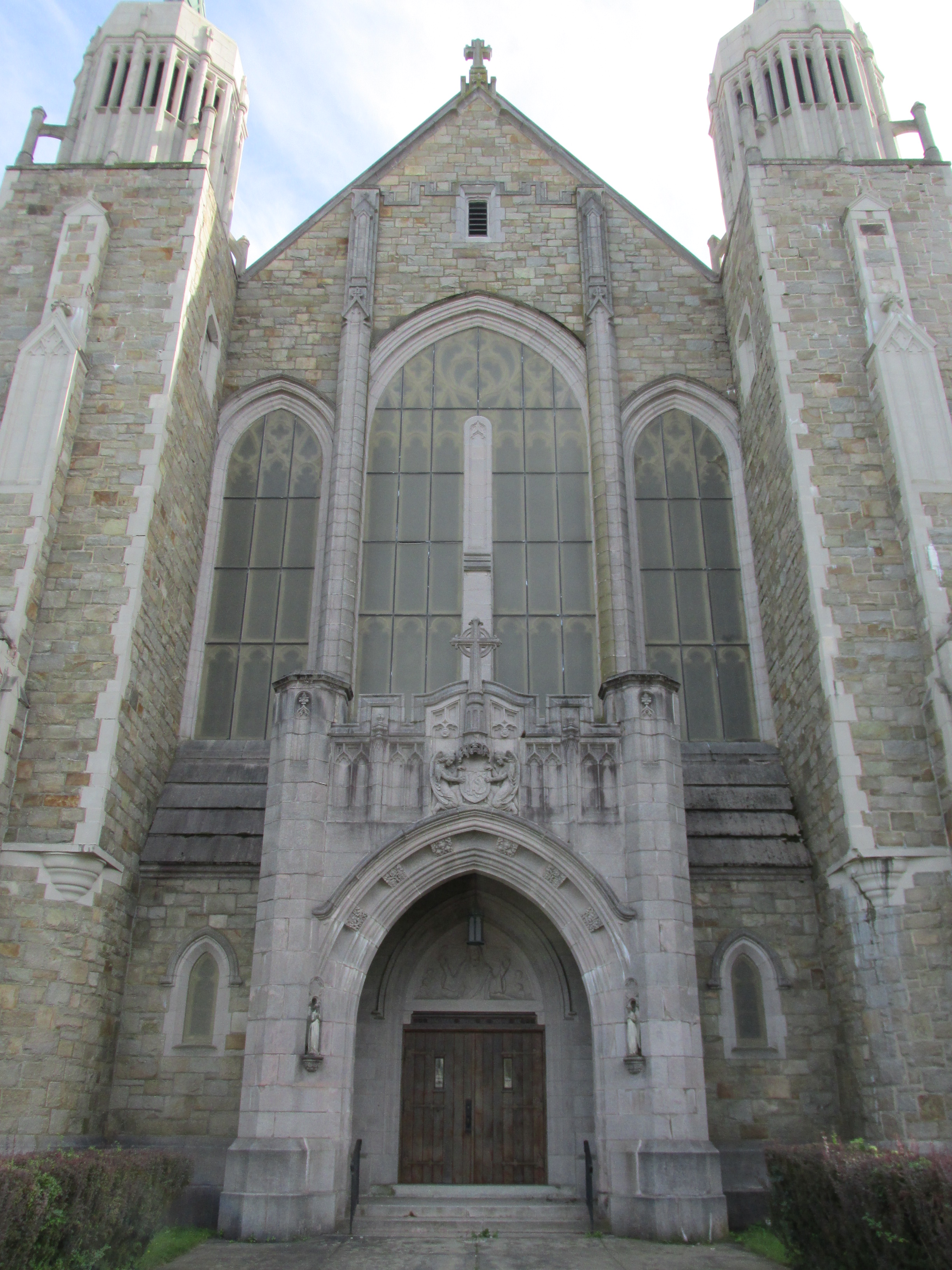
- Sacred Heart Church

- Location within Massachusetts Location within the United States
- Location: Southbridge, Massachusetts
- Coordinates: 42°4′40″N 72°1′44″W
- Built: 1908
- Architect: John W. Donohue (church)
- Architectural style: Colonial Revival, Classical Revival
- MPS: Southbridge MRA
- NRHP reference No.: 89000598
- Added to NRHP: June 22, 1989

The Sacred Heart Church Historic District encompasses the complex of buildings associated with the Sacred Heart Church on Charlton Street in Southbridge, Massachusetts. The complex, which was listed on the National Register of Historic Places in 1989, is the second Roman Catholic parish (after Notre Dame) built to serve Southbridge's growing Franco-American population. The four buildings in the complex were built between 1909 and 1926 in the Colonial Revival style.

The parish was formally established in 1908, and construction on its buildings began in 1909. The first two to be built were the rectory and convent. The rectory, at 40 Charlton Street, is a 2 1/2-story brick structure with a hipped roof which is pierced by a few gable dormers. Its front facade features a central rounded bay, and both side facades have projecting rectangular bays. The convent is of similar styling, except its front facade features two side rounded bays and a central porch. Its rear facade also features an entry porch.

The school, which opened in 1910, was at first run by the Sisters of Nicolette, who also ran the Notre Dame parish school. The building is a large two-story brick block, with projecting sections at the center of each side that rise up to the roof line on three sides, and above the main roof line on the front, which features three round Roman arched doorways. The main roof his hipped, as are the roof lines of the projecting sections.

The church was not completed until 1926. Unlike the other buildings, it has a marked Gothic character, with Gothic-style arched windows, buttresses, and Gothic ornamental detailing.

== See also ==
- National Register of Historic Places listings in Southbridge, Massachusetts
- National Register of Historic Places listings in Worcester County, Massachusetts
