= St. John Cantius Parish, Northampton =

Coordinates: 42°19′13.8″N 72°37′36.8″W

St. John Cantius Parish
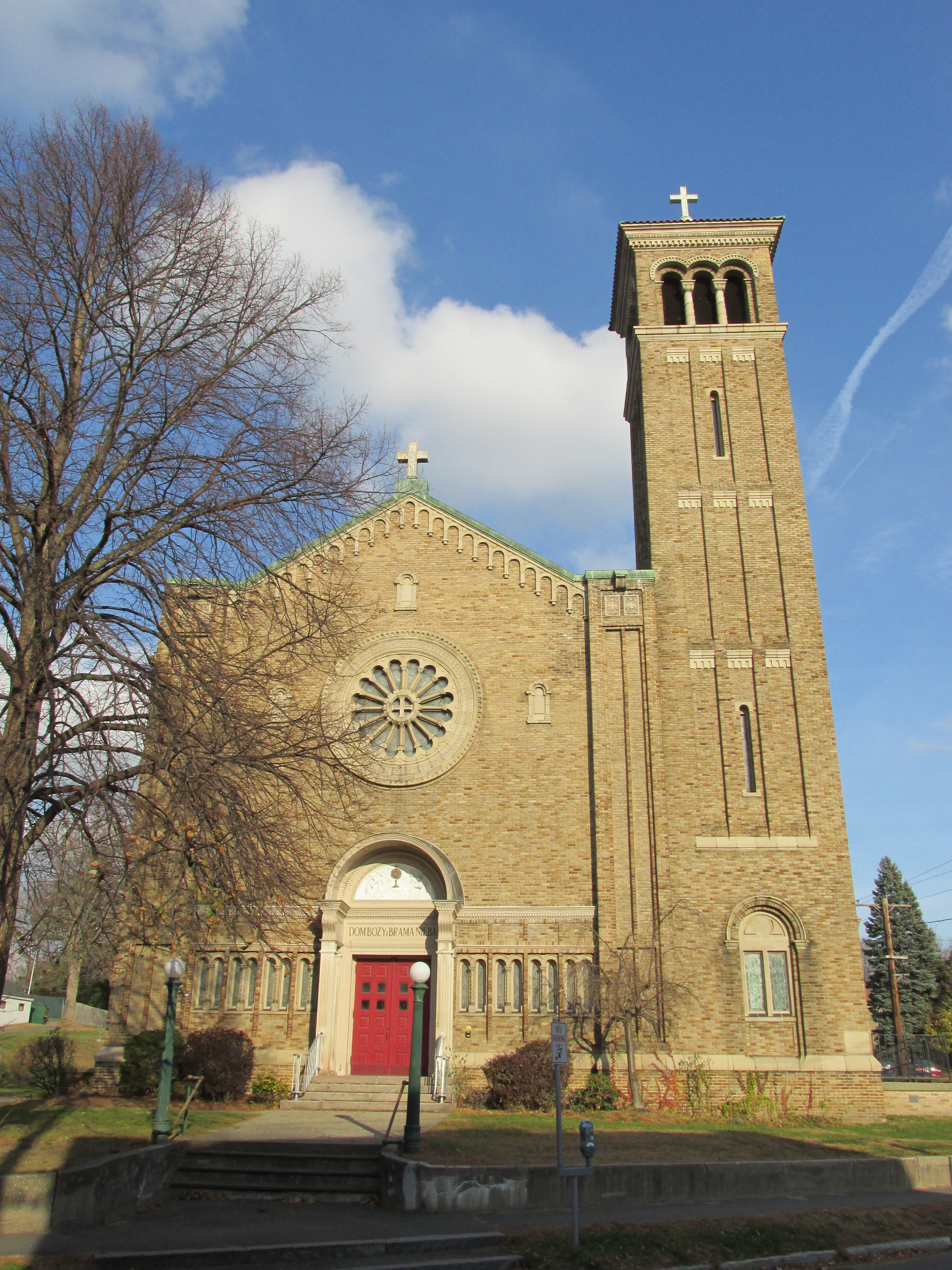
- St. John Cantius Church
- St. John Cantius Parish
- Location: 10 Hawley Street; Northampton, Massachusetts
- Country: United States
- Denomination: Roman Catholic

History
- Founded: 1904
- Founder: Polish immigrants
- Dedication: St. John Cantius

Architecture
- Architect: John W. Donohue

Administration
- Division: Region 5
- Province: Boston
- Diocese: Springfield in Massachusetts

Clergy
- Bishop: Most Rev. Timothy A. McDonnell
- Pastor: Rev. Merle L Lavoie

St. John Cantius Parish is a former Roman Catholic Parish designated for Polish immigrants in Northampton, Massachusetts, United States.

It was founded 1904. It is one of the Polish-American Roman Catholic parishes in New England in the Diocese of Springfield in Massachusetts.

The parish merged with the Sacred Heart Parish in April 2010.

== Bibliography ==
- The 150th Anniversary of Polish-American Pastoral Ministry. Webster, Massachusetts: St. Joseph Basilica. September 11, 2005.
- The Official Catholic Directory in USA
