= Indian Orchard Branch Library =

- U.S. National Register of Historic Places
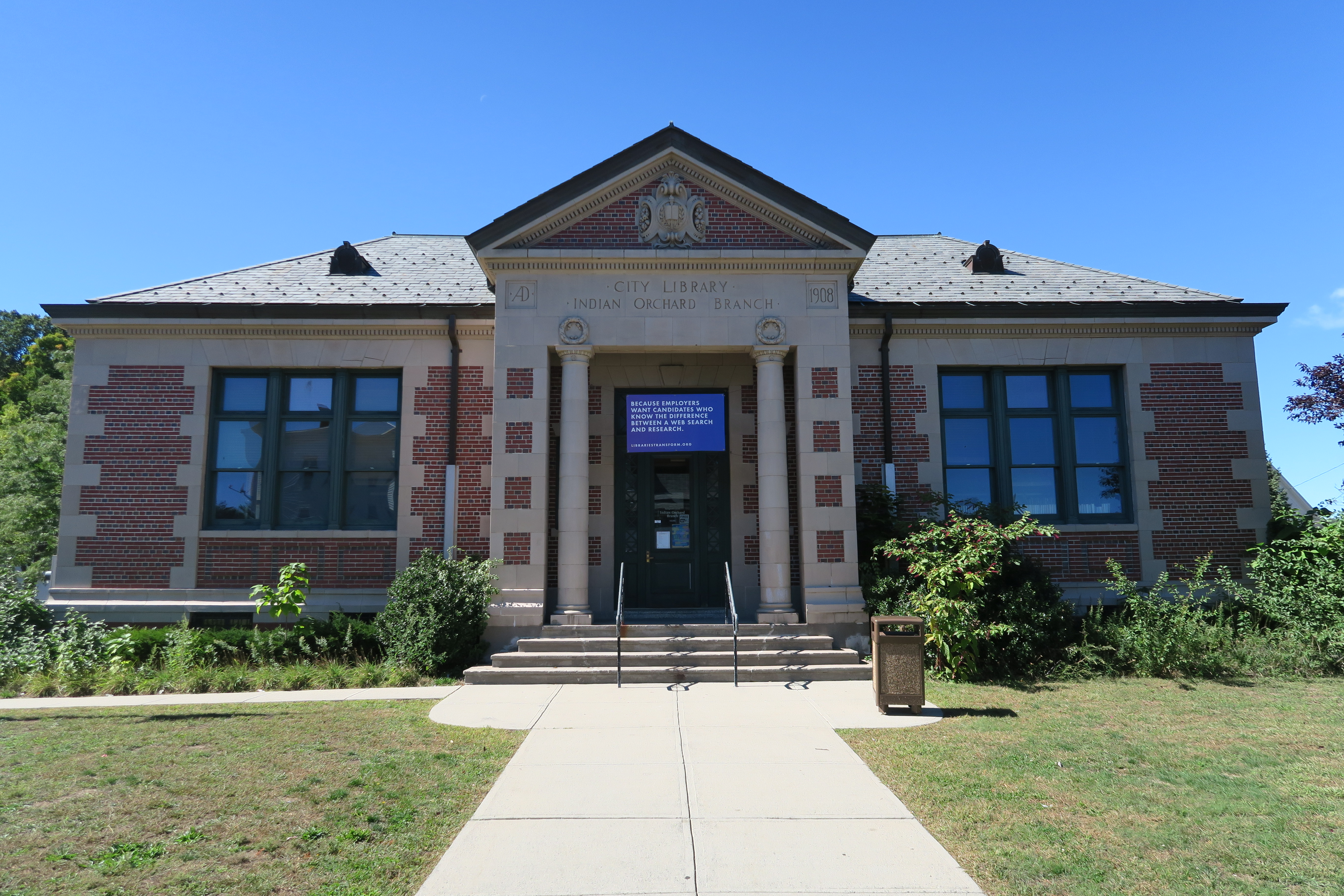
- Indian Orchard Branch Library

- Location within Massachusetts Location within the United States
- Location: 44 Oak St., Springfield, Massachusetts
- Coordinates: 42°9′33″N 72°30′17″W
- Area: less than one acre
- Built: 1909
- Architect: John W. Donohue
- Architectural style: Classical Revival
- NRHP reference No.: 99000258
- Added to NRHP: February 26, 1999

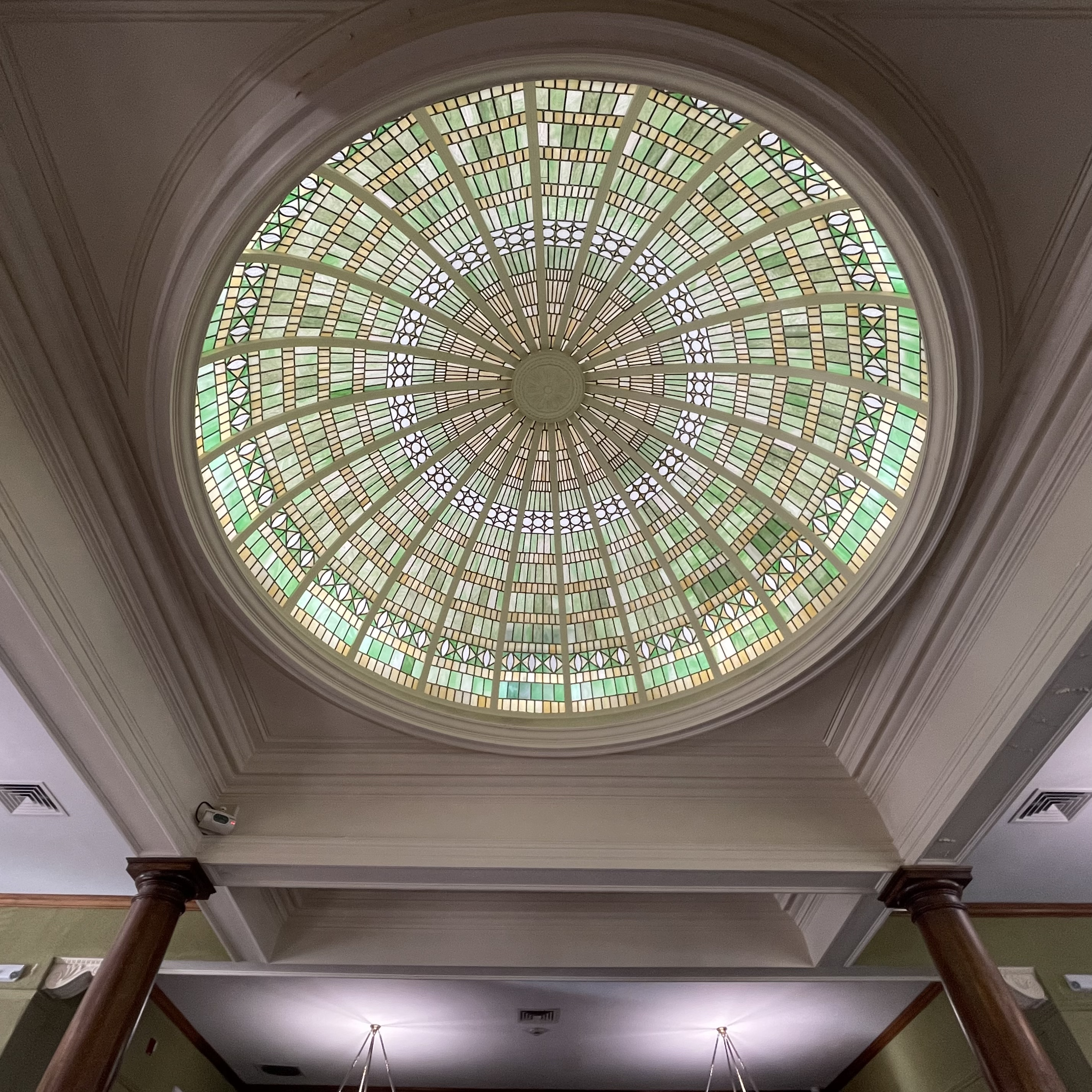
Part of the neoclassical architecture of the original library building contains a cupola and Tuscan columns, pictured here.

The Indian Orchard Branch Library is a historic branch library at 44 Oak Street in Springfield, Massachusetts. The Classic Revival building was constructed in 1909 to a design by John W. Donohue, and was the first permanent branch library building in the Springfield public library system; it was funded in part by a grant from Andrew Carnegie. The building was listed on the National Register of Historic Places in 1999; it continues to serve as a library as a branch of the Springfield City Library system.

== Architecture and history ==
The Indian Orchard Branch Library is located in Springfield's northeastern Indian Orchard neighborhood, at the junction of Worcester and Oak Streets. It consists of the original 1909 building, and an addition made to the rear. The original block is a single story in height, with walls that are mainly brick, and a slate hip roof. A gabled entry vestibule projects to the front, with the entrance recessed behind Tuscan columns. The flanking wall facades each have a band of three windows set in a shared opening. Both the building corners and window openings exhibit stone quoining. The interior retains many original features, including Tuscan columns and pilasters and brick fireplaces.

Indian Orchard developed in the 19th century as a somewhat isolated enclave of industry and residence apart from the rest of the city. Its first library was a private effort founded in 1859 by the Indian Orchard Mills Corporation, which was offered as a free service to area residents. This library had a collection of 1500 volumes by 1884. The city's public library by then had a small collection of 900 volumes maintained by a volunteer. Calls for a permanent branch library began in 1901. Henry Kirke Wight donated space in a commercial building at Oak and Main Streets, which was put to use in 1901. Later in the decade, the city received a grant from philanthropist Andrew Carnegie for new and updated library facilities, which was used in part to fund construction of the present building. It was designed by John W. Donohoe, a prominent local architect, and opened in 1909. The building was featured in a 1911 edition of The American Architect for its simple but elegant Classical Revival design.

== See also ==
- List of Carnegie libraries in Massachusetts
- National Register of Historic Places listings in Springfield, Massachusetts
- National Register of Historic Places listings in Hampden County, Massachusetts
