= Our Lady of Czestochowa Parish, Worcester =

Coordinates: 42°15′6″N 71°47′53″W

Our Lady of Czestochowa Parish
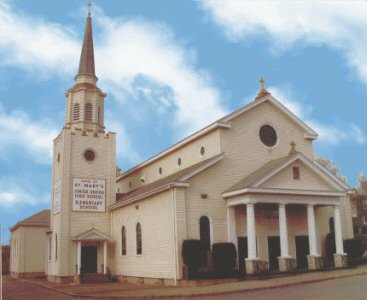
- Our Lady of Czestochowa Parish
- Location: Worcester, Massachusetts
- Country: United States
- Denomination: Roman Catholic
- Website: Parish website

History
- Founded: 29 November 1906
- Founder: Polish immigrants
- Dedication: Our Lady of Czestochowa

Administration
- Division: Cluster 42
- Province: Boston
- Diocese: Worcester

Clergy
- Bishop: Robert Joseph McManus
- Vicar: Edward Michalski
- Pastor: Richard Polek

Our Lady of Czestochowa Parish is a catholic parish designated for Polish immigrants in Worcester, Massachusetts, United States, founded in 1903.

== Bibliography ==
- Proko, Barbara; Baniukiewicz Janice (2003). The Polish Community of Worcester (MA).
- Our Lady of Czestochowa Parish – Celebrating our Hundredth Anniversary 1903-2003. Worcester, Massachusetts. 2003.
