= St. Joseph Parish, Gardner =

Coordinates: 42°34′09″N 71°59′42″W

St. Joseph Parish
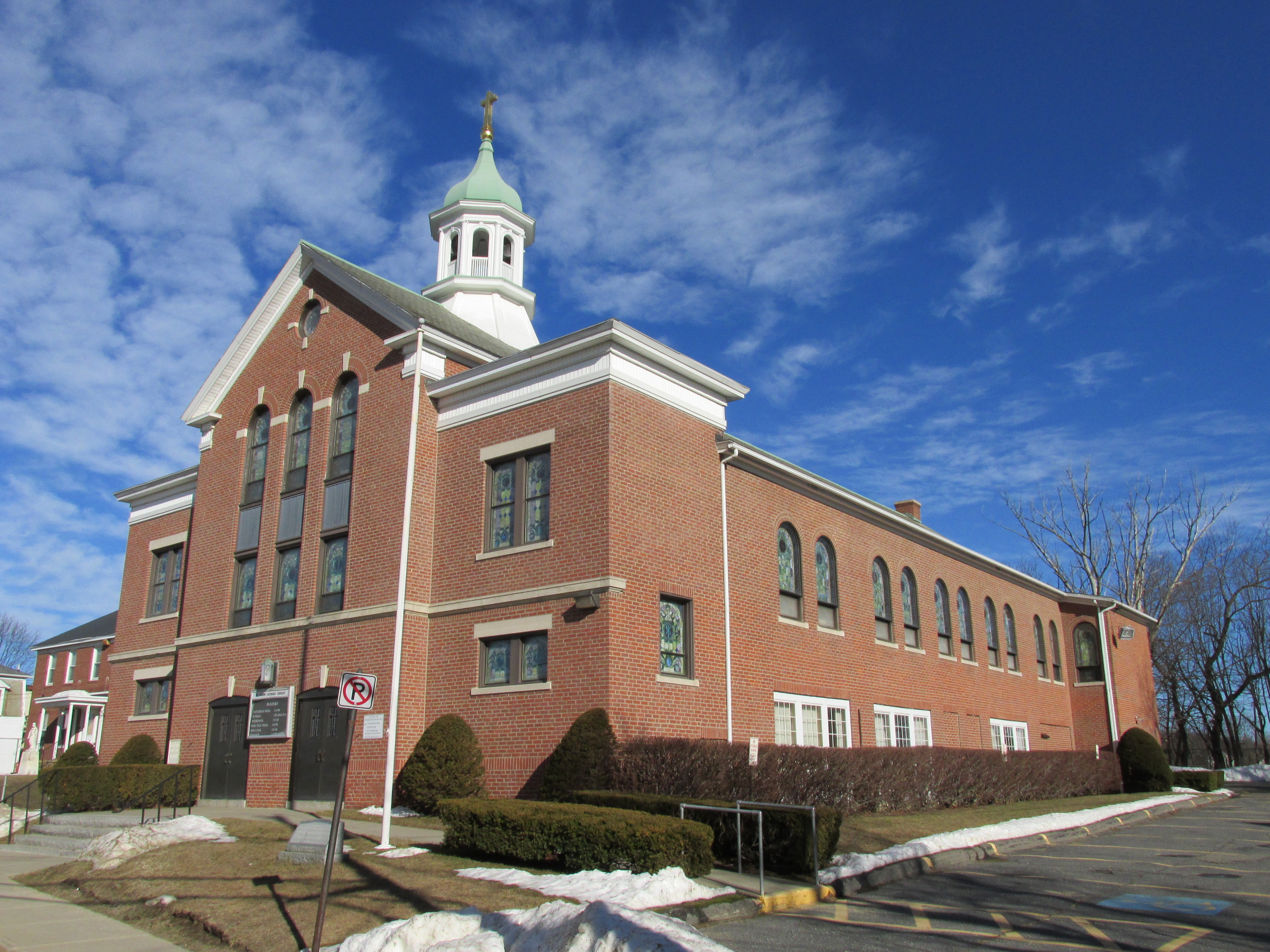
- St. Joseph Church
- St. Joseph Parish
- Location: Gardner, Massachusetts
- Country: United States
- Denomination: Roman Catholic
- Website: Parish website

History
- Founded: December 6, 1908
- Founder: Polish immigrants
- Dedication: St. Joseph

Architecture
- Closed: 2015

Administration
- Division: Cluster 11
- Province: Boston
- Diocese: Worcester

Clergy
- Bishop: Robert Joseph McManus
- Pastor: Thomas M Tokarz

St. Joseph Parish - designated for Polish immigrants in Gardner, Massachusetts, United States. It is one of the Polish-American Roman Catholic parishes in New England in the Diocese of Worcester.

It opened in 1908 and closed in 2015.

== Bibliography ==
- A short parish history from the 1933 Jubilee Book. St. Joseph Parish - Gardner MA: the internet Polish Genealogical Source.
- The 90th Anniversary Booklet 1908-1998. Gardner, Massachusetts. 1998.
- Our Lady of Czestochowa Parish - Centennial 1893-1993. Our Lady of Czestochowa, Boston. 1993.
