= Sacred Heart of Jesus Parish, Easthampton =

Coordinates: 42°16′4.4″N 72°39′36.3″W

Sacred Heart of Jesus Parish
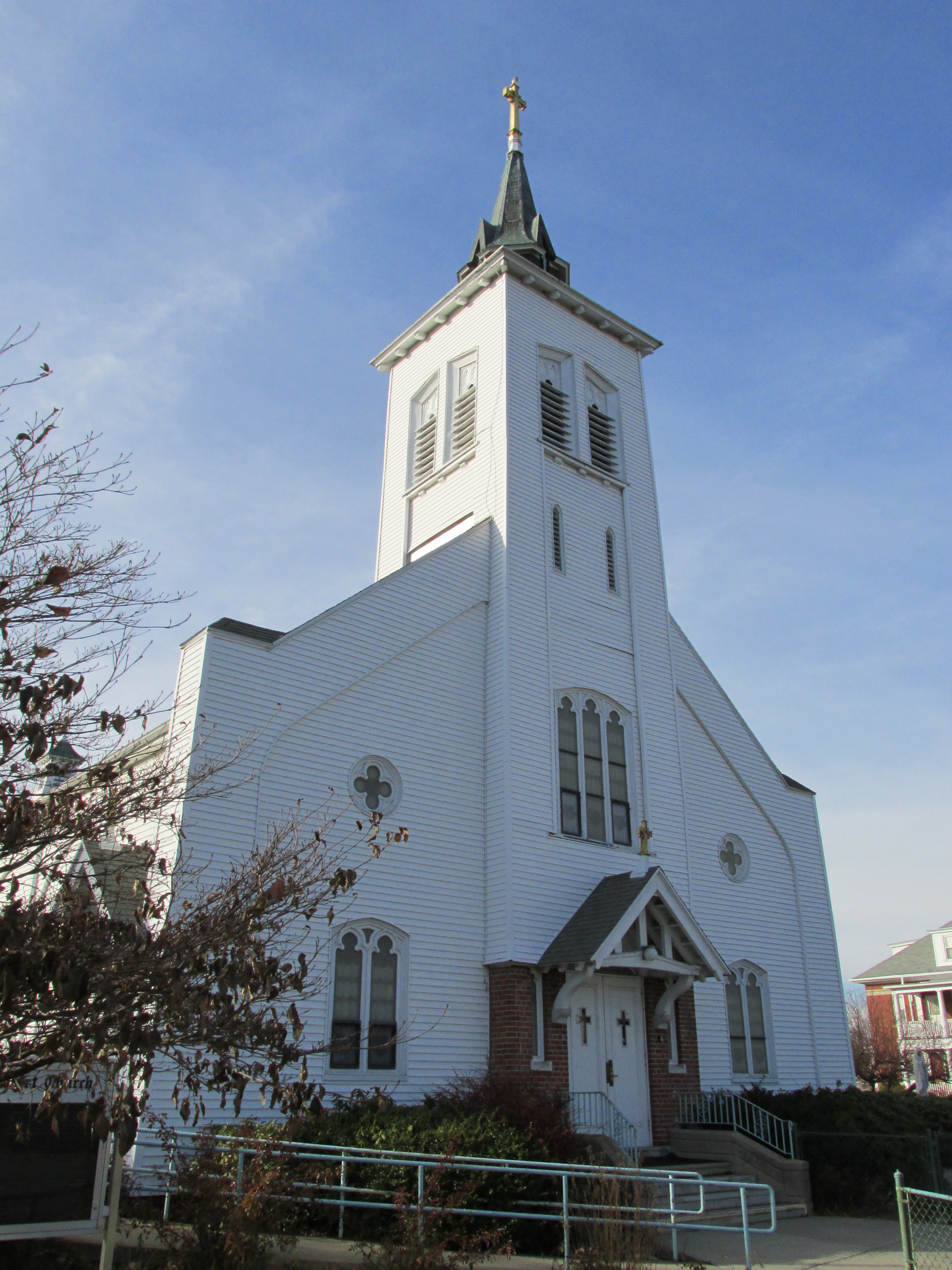
- Sacred Heart of Jesus Parish
- Sacred Heart of Jesus Parish
- Location: 34 Franklin Street; Easthampton, Massachusetts
- Country: United States
- Denomination: Roman Catholic

History
- Founded: 1909
- Founder: Polish immigrants
- Dedication: Sacred Heart of Jesus

Administration
- Division: Region 5
- Province: Boston
- Diocese: Springfield in Massachusetts

Clergy
- Bishop: Most Rev. Timothy A. McDonnell
- Pastor: Rev. James A. Sipitkowski

Sacred Heart of Jesus Parish was designated for Polish immigrants in Easthampton, Massachusetts, United States. It was founded in 1909. It is one of the Polish-American Roman Catholic parishes in New England in the Diocese of Springfield in Massachusetts. It was closed in June 2010.

== History ==
"The Johnny Appleseed" of Polish parishes in western Massachusetts, said Rev. Wladyslaw Kielbasinski, on November 10, 1907, while celebrating Mass in the Easthampton Town Hall, referring to the first parish collection of $9.97, as the beginning of parish fund for the construction of a new church.

November 18, 1909, Rev. John Mard becomes the first Resident Pastor. August 31, 1919, the new Sacred Heart School open to 400 students and 8 Felician Sisters from Enfield, Connecticut.

== School ==
- Sacred Heart School, Easthampton

== Bibliography ==
- The 150th Anniversary of Polish-American Pastoral Ministry. Webster, Massachusetts: St. Joseph Basilica. September 11, 2005.
- The Official Catholic Directory in USA
- Cain, Chad (August 29, 2009). Plan means end, merger for many county parishes. St. Stanislaus B&M Parish - Chicopee MA: Gazettenet.com.
