= Taconic High School =

School in Pittsfield, Massachusetts

Taconic Vocational High School
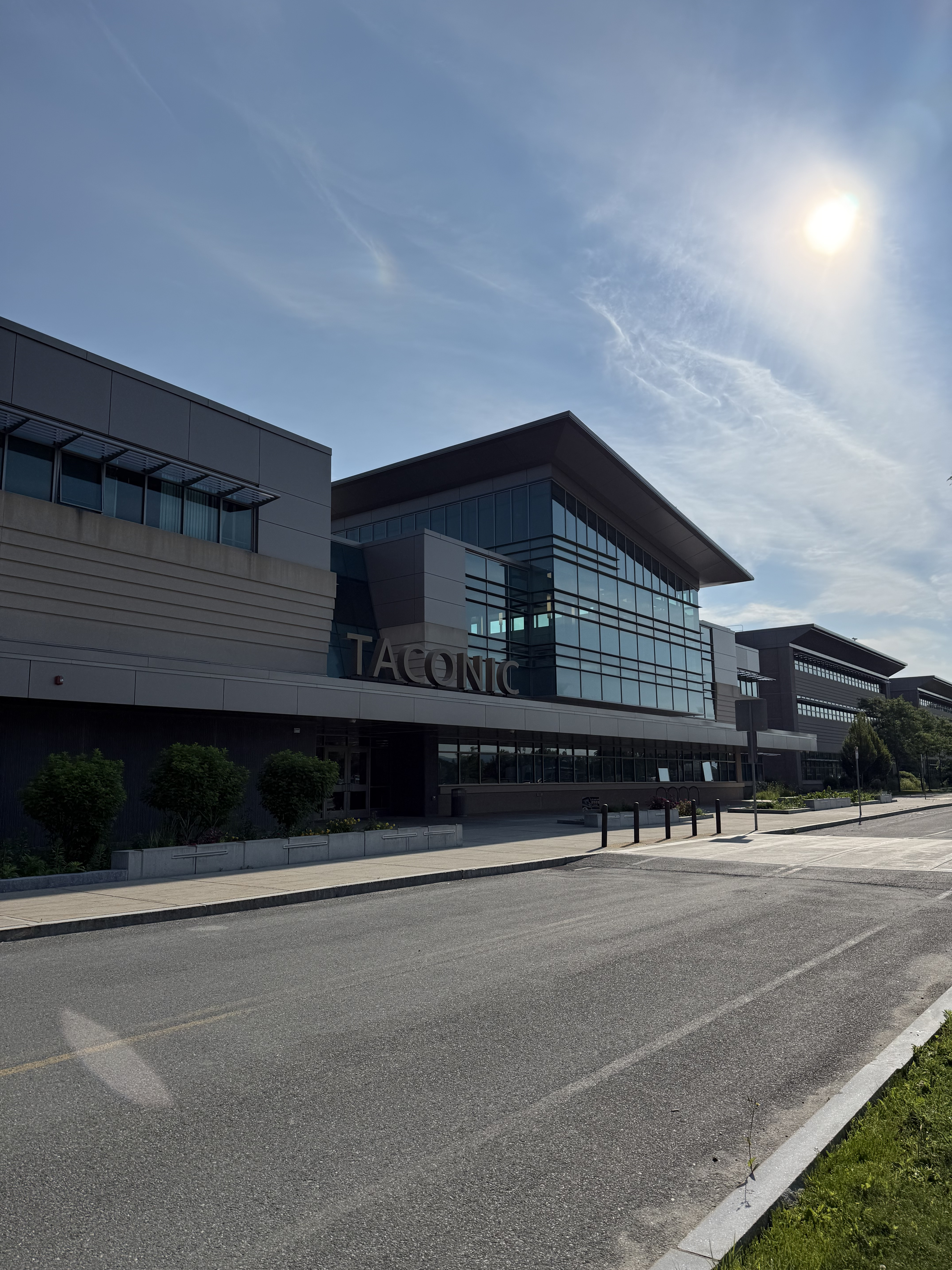

Location
- 96 Valentine Road; Pittsfield, Massachusetts 01201; United States; 42.4592°N 73.2736°W

Information
- Type: Public, Open enrollment
- Established: 1968; 58 years ago
- School district: Pittsfield Public Schools
- Principal: Matthew Bishop
- Staff: 88.74 (FTE)
- Faculty: 136
- Teaching staff: 86
- Grades: 9–12
- Gender: Co-educational
- Enrollment: 824 (2024–2025)
- Student to teacher ratio: 9.29
- Campus type: Suburban
- Colors: Green and gold
- Athletics conference: Berkshire County Conference
- Mascot: Brave
- Team name: Taconic Thunder
- Rival: Pittsfield High School (PHS)
- Accreditation: New England Association of Schools and Colleges
- Publication: The Double-Edged Sword
- Website: taconic.pittsfield.net

Taconic Vocational High School is a vocational high school in Pittsfield, Massachusetts, United States. Taconic was built in 1968 and opened in 1969, which serves as a high school of choice for students in Pittsfield. The school's primary focus is on vocational training and it offers such courses as auto mechanics, printing, drafting, electronics, carpentry, and others. In May 2016, J. H. Maxymillian Inc. broke ground on a $120.8 million plan to construct a new Taconic High School at the same location. The new building was completed in time for the start of the 2018 school year and the old school was demolished upon completion of the new one. An expanded parking lot and soccer field were built where the old school stood in 2019. The new building covers 246,520 square feet. Along with Pittsfield High School, it is one of two high schools in the Pittsfield Public School system. In March 2022, the Taconic Braves were renamed as the Thunder.

== Athletics ==
Taconic has its own volleyball, girls and boys soccer, football, cross country, boys and girls basketball, boys and girls swimming, track and field, baseball and softball teams at the varsity level. It also hosts a co-op golf team with Pittsfield High, and wrestling and ice hockey teams with Pittsfield High and Wahconah Regional High School.

The Thunder have a natural rivalry with Pittsfield High School (PHS) with the two being the two city high schools in Pittsfield. It used to have a rivalry with St. Joe's, which was a private Catholic school in downtown Pittsfield, but has since closed. Taconic and PHS basketball have a big rivalry known as "War on the Floor" which Taconic has generally dominated in the last eight years. However, Pittsfield High has started to pull even, if not ahead, as it split the season series in the 2022–23 and 2023-24 regular seasons.

In addition, the two teams met in the Western Massachusetts Class B Semifinals in 2023-24 and 2024-25. Both games were at Taconic with Taconic being the higher seed and in both games Pittsfield pulled off the upset. Taconic beat Pittsfield four years in a row in football, from 2016-2019, but hasn't won since in the "Battle at BCC".

Taconic won baseball state championships in 2017, 2019 and 2021, while making it to the MIAA Division III Final Four in 2023. Its boys basketball team won its first ever state title in 2023, beating David Prouty for the MIAA Division V crown. It has made seven straight state semifinals, including four straight since COVID, 2022 and 2023 (both in Division V) and 2024 and 2025 (both in Division III).

Taconic won a state title in Bowling in 2024.
