= Pittsfield High School (Massachusetts) =

Coordinates: 42°26′49.10″N 73°14′53.62″W

- PHS

Location
- 300 East Street; Pittsfield, Massachusetts 01201; United States

Information
- Type: Public; Coeducational; Open enrollment
- Established: 1844
- School district: Pittsfield Public Schools
- Dean: Molly West
- Principal: Lynn Taylor
- Staff: https://pittsfieldhigh.pittsfield.net/en-US/staff
- Grades: 9–12
- Age range: 14-18
- Language: English, Spanish
- Colors: Purple and White
- Athletics conference: Berkshire County Conference
- Sports: Yes
- Mascot: The General
- Team name: Generals
- Rival: Taconic High School and St. Joseph Central High School
- Accreditation: New England Association of Schools and Colleges
- Newspaper: Generally Speaking
- Yearbook: The Dome
- Website: http://pittsfieldhigh.pittsfield.net/

Pittsfield High School is a four year comprehensive public high school in Pittsfield, Massachusetts, United States. It serves the city of Pittsfield. The school dates its founding to 1844. It is administered by the Pittsfield Public Schools district and is the oldest of the district's two high schools. Enrollment for the 2014–2015 school year included 916 students. 51% of the student population was female and 49% were male. Students of African American, Asian, Hispanic, Native American, Native Hawaiian, Pacific Islander and Multi-Race, Non-Hispanic ethnicity and heritage comprised 21.8% percent of the student population.

== History ==
Pittsfield High School (PHS) traces its founding to 1844 when a town meeting voted to establish the community's first high school. Six years later in November 1850, PHS opened in a three-room wooden building on a site occupied by the current city hall. Several sites and buildings later, the current facility opened on September 9, 1931.

== Academics ==
Graduation requirements include: 1) earning 244 credits, 2) completing one of four certificate programs (Arts and Sciences, Business and Management Studies, Career/Technical Education or Work Based Learning) and 3) passing the Massachusetts Comprehensive Assessment System (MCAS) exam. The school's academic departments include Business, English, Fine and Performing Arts, Mathematics, Science, Social Studies, Special Education, Career Technical and World Languages.

== Student life ==
=== Activities ===
PHS extracurricular activities include After School Social Club, Art Club, Band, Best Buddies, Cheerleading, Class Council, Computer Club, Mock Trial, Drama Club, Engineering Club, Jazz Lab, Rock Band Club, UNO Club, French Club, Italian Club, Mural Club, Latin Club, Literary Magazine, Orchestra, The Dome yearbook, Generally Speaking student newspaper, Gay Straight Alliance, Morningside/PHS Community Service Learning and Tutoring Project, National Honor Society, New England Math League, PHS/Williams Community Service Learning Project, Peace Jam, Pep Club, Photography Club, Quiz Team, SADD, Horticulture, Silk Screening Club, Spanish Club and Student Government.

=== Athletics ===
PHS fields varsity boys and girls athletic teams. The school was a member of the Berkshire County Conference athletic league. Member schools include Drury High School in North Adams, Hoosac Valley High School in Cheshire, Lee High School in Lee, Lenox Memorial High School in Lenox, Monument Mountain Regional High School in Great Barrington, Mt. Everett Regional High School in Sheffield, Mt. Greylock Regional High School in Williamstown, St. Joseph Central High School (Catholic) in Pittsfield, Taconic High School in Pittsfield and Wahconah Regional High School in Dalton.

Since the Massachusetts Interscholastic Athletic Association (MIAA) revamped its postseason tournaments and structure, it removed Berkshire County's status which effectively ended the old Berkshire league. However, Pittsfield High still maintains rivalries with other county teams. It has won the last five football games against city-rival Taconic in the "Battle at BCC". The football team also has a rival with Wahconah, although the latter has dominated the rivalry in the last 15 years. PHS and Taconic have a big rivalry on the basketball court, nicknamed "War on the Floor" which often takes place at the Boys and Girls Club in Pittsfield. Taconic boys basketball won 16 games straight over the PHS boys until the Generals managed to split the games in 2023.

PHS has varsity cross country, boys and girls soccer, football, boys and girls basketball, boys and girls swimming, cross country skiing, baseball, softball and track and field teams. It also hosts a co-op with Taconic for boys and girls lacrosse and golf. It also is part of a three-school co-op, along with Wahconah and hosted by Taconic for ice hockey and wrestling.

In 2024, the PHS softball team won its first Western Massachusetts title since 2018 and made it to the MIAA Division IV State Final Four. The Pittsfield baseball team won its first Western Massachusetts title in 20 years and made it to the MIAA Division IV State Championship game, losing to Seekonk.

Recent accomplishments of PHS athletic teams

- Eliza Mullen – Alpine State Champion in Slalom and Grand Slalom (2024, 2025)
- Boys Alpine Skiing – State Champions (1999)

== Notable alumni ==
- Elizabeth Banks, actress
- Mark Belanger, professional baseball player
- Ali Louis Bourzgui, actor and singer
- Kim Cobb, climate scientist
- Art Ditmar, professional baseball player
- Elaine Giftos, dancer and actress
- Alan Gionet, news anchor
- Tom Grieve, professional baseball player
- Rick Lisi, professional baseball player
- John Pappalau, professional baseball player
- Robert Prentiss, Massachusetts and New York politician
- Joseph Scelsi, Massachusetts state legislator
- Niraj Shah, co-founder, co-chairman, and CEO of Wayfair
- Howie Storie, professional baseball player
- Matt Torra, professional baseball player
- Earl Turner, professional baseball player
- Charles White Whittlesey, MoH, lieutenant colonel in the United States Army
- Major General Jeannine M. Ryder (Coan)
