= List of churches in the Archdiocese of Boston =

This is a list of current and former Roman Catholic churches in the Archdiocese of Boston in Massachusetts in the United States. The archdiocese includes more than 300 churches. The cathedral church of the diocese is the Cathedral of Holy Cross in Boston. The oldest church in the archdiocese is the Church of the Immaculate Conception in Salem, dedicated in 1857.

The archdiocese is divided into five pastoral regions, each headed by an episcopal vicar.

== Current churches ==
=== Central Region ===
The Central Region covers the cities of Boston and Cambridge

Church	Location	Website	Description/Notes
Basilica and Shrine of Our Lady of Perpetual Help	1545 Tremont St, Boston (Roxbury)	Link	Founded in 1869 by the Redemptorist religious order, the current church was dedicated in 1878. It was declared a minor basilica in 1954
Boston Chinese Catholic Community	St. James the Greater Church, 125 Harrison Ave, Boston (Chinatown)	Link	Founded in 1854 to service Irish immigrants. Now the Boston Chinese Catholic Community
Cathedral of the Holy Cross	1400 Washington St, Boston (South End)	Link	Cathedral dedicated in 1875. It is the largest church in New England, seating 2,000 worshipers.
Shrine of Our Lady of Good Voyage	51 Seaport Blvd, Boston (South Boston)		Founded in 1952, current chapel dedicated in 2017. The shrine is an apostolate of the Cathedral of the Holy Cross
Catholic Parishes of the Blue Hills	Most Precious Blood Church, 25 Maple St, Boston (Hyde Park)		Founded in 1870, current church dedicated in 1880. Now part of Blue Hills
	St. Anne Church, 90 W Milton St, Boston (Readville)		Founded in 1919, current church dedicated in 1882. Nww part of Blue Hills
Catholic Roxbury	St. Mary of the Angels Church, 377 Walnut Ave, Boston (Jamaica Plain)		Founded in 1906. Now part of Catholic Roxbury
	Our Lady of Lourdes Church, 14 Montebello Rd, Boston (Jamaica Plain)		Now part of Catholic Roxbury
	St. Thomas Aquinas Church, 97 South St, Boston (Jamaica Plain)		Now part of Catholic Roxbury
Charlestown Catholic Collaborative	St. Frances de Sales Church, 313 Bunker Hill St, Boston (Charlestown)		Founded in 1859. Now part of the Charlestown Collaborative
	St. Mary – St. Catherine of Siena Church, 46 Winthrop St, Boston (Charlestown)		Founded in 2006 from the merger of St. Catherine of Siena and St. Mary Parishes. Now part of the Charlestown Collaborative
Dorchester Catholic	Holy Family Church, 24 Hartford St, Boston (Dorchester)		Now part of Dorchester Catholic
	St. Peter Church, 311 Bowdoin St, Boston (Dorchester)		Now part of Dorchester Catholic
	St. Patrick Church, 400 Dudley St, Boston (Roxbury)		Founded in 1836. Now part of Dorchester Catholic
Gate of Heaven /St. Brigid Parishes	Gate of Heaven Church, 615 E. Fourth St, Boston(South Boston)		Founded in 1863. Now partnered with St. Brigid Parish
	St. Brigid of Kildare Church, 841 E Broadway, Boston (South Boston)		Founded in 1908.Now partnered with Gate of Heaven Parish
Holy Name	1689 Centre St, Boston (West Roxbury)		Founded in 1927, current church dedicated in 1939
Lourdes Center	698 Beacon St, Boston (Fenway–Kenmore)		Founded in 1949, Lourdes Chapel dedicated in 1963
Madonna Queen of the Universe Shrine	150 Orient Ave, Boston(East Boston)		
Most Holy Redeemer	72 Maverick St, Boston (East Boston)		Founded in 1844 for Irish immigrants, church dedicated that same year
Our Lady of the Airways	International Tower at Logan International Airport (East Boston)		Founded in 1951, the first airport chapel in the United States
Our Lady of the Assumption	404 Sumner St, Boston (East Boston)		Current church dedicated in 1873
Our Lady of Carmel Parish	St. Angela Merici Church, 1540 Blue Hill Ave, Boston Mattapan		Now part of Our Lady of Carmel Parish
	St. Matthew Church, 39 Stanton St, Boston (Dorchester)		Now part of Our Lady of Carmel Parish
Our Lady of Czestochowa	655 Dorchester Ave, Boston (South Boston)		Founded in 1893, the first parish for Polish immigrants in Eastern New England. The church was dedicated in 1894
Paulist Center	5 Park St, Boston (Downtown)		Founded in the 1940s, Holy Spirit Chapel was dedicated in the 1950s
Sacred Heart	39 6th St, Cambridge		Founded in 1842, church dedicated in 1883
Sacred Heart	45 Brooks St, Boston (East Boston)		Founded in 1869, current church dedicated in 1966
Sacred Heart	60 Brown Ave, Boston (Roslindale)		Founded in 1893, current church dedicated in 1910
South Boston-Seaport Catholic Collaborative	St. Monica Church, 331 Old Colony Ave, Boston (South Boston)		Founded in 1907. Part of South Boston Collaborative since 2015
	St. Peter Lithuanian Church, 75 Flaherty Way, Boston (South Boston)		Founded in 1896, current church dedicated in 1904. Part of South Boston Collaborative since 2015
St. Anthony Shrine	100 Arch St, Boston (Downtown)		Founded in 1945, current shrine dedicated in 1955
St. Anthony of Padua	43 Holton St, Boston, (Allston)		Founded in 1885
St. Anthony	400 Cardinal Medeiros Ave, Cambridge		Founded in 1902 for Portuguese immigrants
St. Cecilia	18 Belvidere St, Boston (Back Bay)		Founded in 1888, current church dedicated in 1894
St. Clement Eucharistic Shrine	1105 Boylston St, (Boston Fenway–Kenmore)		Church constructed in 1923, dedicated as a Catholic chapel in 1935
St. Columbkille	321 Market St, Boston (Brighton)		Founded in 1871, current church dedicated in 1880
St. Francis Chapel	800 Boylston St, Boston (Back Bay)		Founded in the Prudential Center in 1969. operated by the Oblates of the Virgin Mary religious order since 1983
St. Francis of Assisi	325 Cambridge St, Cambridge		Church constructed in 1837, founded as a Catholic Parish in 1917
St. Gregory	2215 Dorchester Ave, Boston (Dorchester)		Founded in 1862, current church dedicated in 1881
St. John Chrysostom	4750 Washington St, Boston (West Roxbury)		Founded in 1952, current church dedicated that same year
St. John the Evangelist	2254 Massachusetts Ave, North Cambridge		Romanesque Revival, built in 1904
St. Joseph	68 William Cardinal O'Connell Way, Boston (West End)		Church constructed for Congregationalists in 1834, dedicated as a Catholic parish for Irish immigrants in 1862
St. Joseph – St. Lazarus	59 Ashley St, Boston (East Boston)		Founded as St. Lazarus for Italian immigrants in 1904, church dedicated in 1923. Merged with St. Joseph in 1985
St. Katharine Drexel	517 Blue Hill Ave, Boston (Dorchester)		Founded in 2005 to serve the African-American community
St. Leonard of Port Maurice	320 Hanover St, Boston (North End)		Founded in the 1870s to serve Italian immigrants, current church dedicated in 1899
St. Mark / St. Ambrose Parishes	St. Ambrose Church, 246 Adams St, Boston (Dorchester)		Founded in 1914. Now partnered with St. Mark Parish
	St. Mark Church, 246 Adams St, Boston (Dorchester)		Now partnered with St. Ambrose Parish
St. Martin de Porres Parish	St. Ann Church, 51 Neponset Ave, Boston (Dorchester)		Founded in 1889. Now part of St. Martin de Porres Parish
St. Paul	29 Mount Auburn St, Cambridge		Founded in 1873, current church dedicated in 1923
St. Peter	100 Concord Ave, Cambridge		Founded in 1848
St. Stephen	401 Hanover St, Boston (North End)		Constructed in 1804 by Charles Bulfinch as a Congregationalist church, became a catholic parish in 1862
St. Teresa of Calcutta Parish	St. Margaret Church, 800 Columbia Road (Dorchester)		Now part of St. Theresa of Calcutta
St. Theresa of Avila	2078 Centre St, Boston (West Roxbury)		Founded in 1895

=== Merrimack Region ===
The Merrimack Region covers the Merrimack Valley region of Essex and Middlesex Counties (including Lowell) in the northernmost section of the archdiocese

Name	Image	Location	Description/Notes
All Saints		120 Bellevue Ave, Haverhill	Parish founded in 1998 with the merger of St. Joseph, St. Rita, St. George, and St. Michael Parishes
Blessed Trinity Parish		St. Anne Church, 75 King St, Littleton	Founded in 1945, current church dedicated in 1960. Became part of Blessed Trinity Parish in 2021
		St. Catherine of Alexandria Church, 107 North Main St., Westford	Founded in 1922. Became part of Blessed Trinity Parish in 2021
Corpus Christi Parish at Holy Rosary Church		107 Summer St, Lawrence	
Holy Redeemer Immaculate Conception Collaborative		Holy Redeemer Church, 4 Green St, Merrimac	Founded in 2006 with the merger of Nativity Church and St. Ann Church. Part of the Collaborative since 2015
		Immaculate Conception Church, 42 Green St, Newburyport	Founded in 1844, current church dedicated in 1853. Part of the Collaborative since 2015
Holy Trinity		350 High St, Lowell	Founded in 1904 to serve Polish immigrants and church dedicated that same year.
Immaculate Conception		144 E Merrimack St, Lowell	Current church dedicated in 1877
Lowell Collaborative		St. Anthony of Padua Church, 893 Central St, Lowell	Founded in 1902 to serve Portuguese immigrants, church dedicated in 1908. Became part of Lowell Collaborative in 2016
		Holy Family Church, 75 Chamberlain St, Lowell	Became part of Lowell Collaborative in 2016
Methuen Catholic		St. Monica Church, 212 Lawrence St, Methuen	Founded as a mission in 1897, became a parish in 1917. The current church was dedicated in 1997. Now part of Methuen Catholic
		St. Lucy Church, 254 Merrimack St, Methuen	Now part of Methuen Catholic
Our Lady of Good Counsel		22 Plymouth St, Methuen	Founded in 2000 with the merger of St. Theresa and St. Augustine Parishes
Our Lady of Hope and St. Paul Parishes		Our Lady of Hope Church, 1 Pineswamp Rd, Ipswich	Now partnered with St. Paul Parish
		St. Paul Church, 50 Union St, South Hamilton	Current church dedicated in 1908, parish founded in 1922. Now partnered with Our Lady of Hope Parish
Parish of the Transfiguration		126 Middlesex Ave, Wilmington	Founded in 2018 with the merger of St. Dorothy and St. Thomas of Villanova Parishes
River of Divine Mercy Catholic Communities		Sainte Marguerite d'Youville Church, 1340 Lakeview Ave, Dracut	Now part of River of Divine Mercy Communities
		St. Rita Church, 158 Mammoth Rd, Lowell	Founded in 1910. Now part of River of Divine Mercy Communities
		St. Mary Magdalen Church, 95 Lakeview Ave, Tyngsborough	Current church dedicated in 2011. Now part of River of Divine Mercy Communities
Sacred Hearts Parish		Sacred Hearts Church,165 S Main St, Haverhill	Founded in 1908.
		St. Patrick Church, 114 Center St, Groveland	Now part of Sacred Hearts Parish
St. Agnes and St. Rose of Lima Parishes		St. Agnes Church, 22 Boston St, Middleton	Now partnered with St. Rose of Lima Parish
		St. Rose of Lima Church, 12 Park St, Topsfield	Now partnered with St. Agnes Parish
St. Andre Bessette Parish		St. Joseph Church, 11 Sparhawk St, Amesbury	Now part of St. Andre Bessette Parish
		Star of the Sea Church, 18 Beach Rd, Salisbury	Now part of St. Andre Bessette Parish
St. J's Collaborative		Our Lady of Grace Church, 28 Tarbell St, Pepperell	Now part of St. J's Collaborative
		St. John the Evangelist Church, Townsend	Now part of St. J's Collaborative
St. Robert Bellarmmine		198 Haggetts Pond Rd, Andover	Founded in 1968, current church dedicated in 1982
St. Matthew the Evangelist Parish		St. Theresa of Lisieux Church, 466 Boston Rd, Billerica	Founded in 1945, current church dedicated in 1959. Now part of St. Matthew Parish
		St. Andrew Church, 45 Talbot Ave, North Billerica	Founded as a mission in 1868 to serve Irish immigrants. Current church dedicated in 1921. Now part of St. Matthew Parish
St. Michael		12 Sixth St, Lowell	Founded in 1883 to serve Irish immigrants, current church dedicated in 1900
St. Michael		196 Main St, North Andover	Founded as a mission in 1869, current church dedicated in 1886. Became a parish in 1900
St. Patrick		114 S. Broadway, Lawrence	Founded as a mission in 1869, became a parish in 1872. Current church dedicated in 1894
St. Patrick		284 Suffolk St, Lowell	Founded in 1831, St. Patrick is the third oldest parish in the archdiocese. Current church consecrated in 1874
St. William of York		1352 Main St, Tewksbury	Founded in 1935 by the Oblates of Mary Immaculate religious order

=== North Region ===
The North Region covers the North Shore and the inner inland northern Boston suburbs (“Metro-North”). It Includes portions of Essex, Middlesex, and Suffolk Counties (Lynn, Salem, and Woburn).

Name	Image	Location	Description/Notes
Ave Maria Parish		Our Lady of Assumption Church, 758 Salem St, Lynnfield	Current church dedicated in 1922, became a parish in 1937. Now part of Ave Maria Parish
		St. Mary Goretti Church, 112 Chestnut St, Lynnfield	Established in 1960, current church dedicated in 1961. Now part of Ave Maria Parish
Beverly Catholic Collaborative		St. John the Evangelist Church, 111 New Balch St, Beverly	Now part of Beverly Collaborative
		St. Margaret Church, 672 Hale St, Beverly	Founded as a mission in 1885, current church dedicated in 1887. Now part of Beverly Collaborative
		St. Mary Star of the Sea Church, 253 Cabot St, Beverly	Founded in 1870, current church dedicated in 1898. Now part of Beverly Collaborative
Blessed Mother of the Morningstar		St. Mary of the Assumption Church, 670 Washington Ave, Revere	Founded in 1947, current church dedicated in 1948. Now part of Morningstar
		Our Lady of Grace Church, 194 Nichols St, Chelsea	Founded in 1913, current church dedicated in 1917. Now part of Morningstar
Catholic Churches of Arlington		St. Agnes Church, 32 Medford St, Arlington	Founded as St. Malachy in 1872, renamed St. Agnes in 1900. Now part of Catholic Churches of Arlington
		St. Camillus Church, 185 Concord Tpk, Arlington	Now part of Catholic Churches of Arlington
Catholic Community of Gloucester and Rockport		Holy Family Church, 60 Prospect St, Gloucester	Now part of the Catholic Community
		Our Lady of Good Voyage Church, 142 Prospect St, Gloucester	Founded in 1893 for Portuguese immigrants, church dedicated in 1915. Now part of the Catholic Community
Christ the King Parish		St. Agnes Church, 186 Woburn St, Reading	Became part of Christ the King Parish in 2023
		St. Athanasius Church, 300 Haverhill St, Reading	Became part of Christ the King Parish in 2023
Danvers Catholic Collaborative		St. Mary of the Annunciation Church, 24 Conant St, Danvers	Founded in 1871, current church dedicated in 1937. Became part of Danvers Collaborative in 2023
		St. Richard of Chichester Church, 90 Forest St, Danvers	Founded in 1963. Became part of Danvers Collaborative in 2023
Host Catholic		Holy Family Church, 21 Bessom St, Lynn	Founded in 1922 for Italian immigrants, current church dedicated in 1928. Now part of Host Catholic
		St. Pius V Church, 215 Maple St, Lynn	Founded in 1912, current church dedicated in 1949. Now part of Host Catholic
Immaculate Conception		489 Broadway, Everett	Founded as St. Mary Parish in 1882
Immaculate Conception		600 Pleasant St, Malden	Founded in 1854
Immaculate Conception		133 Beach St, Revere	Founded in 1893
Incarnation		429 Upham St, Melrose	Established in 1958
Lazarus Center for Healing Shrine		47 Butler Ave, Wakefield	Founded as St. Florence Parish, became Lazarus Center in 2023
Mary, Queen of the Apostles Parish		Immaculate Conception Church, 15 Hawthorne Blvd, Salem	Founded in 1825, church dedicated in 1857. It is the oldest parish church in the archdiocese
Mary, Queen of Peace Parish		St. Francis of Assisi Church, 441 Fellsway West, Medford	Founded in 1921. Now part of Mary, Queen of Peace
		St. Joseph Church, 118 High St, Medford	Current church dedicated in 1912. Now part of Mary, Queen of Peace
Most Blessed Sacrament		1155 Main St, Wakefield	
Our Lady of Fatima		50 Walsh Ave, Peabody	Founded as a mission for Portuguese immigrants in 1965. Current church dedicated in 1975
Our Lady of Hope and St. Paul Parishes		St. Paul Church, 50 Union St, Hamilton	Church dedicated in 1908, St. Paul parish founded in 1922. Now Our Lady Parish.
Our Lady Star of the Sea		85 Atlantic Ave, Marblehead	
Peabody Catholic Parishes		St. John the Baptist Church, 17 Chestnut St, Peabody	Founded in 1871, current church dedicated in 1879. Now part of Peabody Catholic
		St. Thomas the Apostle Church, 3 Margin St, Peabody	Founded in 1927, current church dedicated in 1931. Now part of Peabody Catholic
Sacred Hearts		315 Main St, Malden	Founded in 1890, current church dedicated in 1901
Saugus Catholics		Blessed Sacrament Church, 14 Summer St, Saugus	Founded in 1917, Now part of Saugus Catholics
		St. Margaret Mary Church, 431 Lincoln Ave, Saugus	Founded in 1885 as a mission, current church dedicated in 1887. Now part of Saugus Catholics
St. Adelaide		712 Lowell St, Peabody	Founded in 1962 and current church dedicated that same year.
St. Ann		140 Lynn St, Peabody	
St. Anne		292 Jefferson Ave, Salem	Founded in 1901 to serve French-Canadian immigrants. Current church dedicated in 1986
St. Anthony of Padua		46 Oakes St, Everett	Founded in 1927 for Italian immigrants, current church dedicated in 1932
St. Anthony of Padua		250 Revere St, Revere	Founded in 1906 for Italian immigrants, current church dedicated in 1926
St. Charles Borromeo		280 Main St, Woburn	Founded in 1862, current church dedicated in 1869
St. Eulalia		50 Ridge St, Winchester	
St. James		160 Federal St, Salem	Founded in 1850 for Irish immigrants
St. John the Evangelist / St. Thomas Aquinas		St. Thomas Aquinas Church, 248 Nahant Rd, Nahant	Now partnered with St. John the Evangelist Parish
		St. John the Evangelist Church, 174 Humphrey St, Swampscott	Now partnered with St. Thomas Aquinas Parish
St. John Paul II Shrine of Divine Mercy		30 St Peter St, Salem	
St. Joseph		115 Union St, Lynn	
St. Joseph		770 Salem St, Malden	Founded as a mission 1894, because a parish in 1902
St. Joseph		173 Albion St, Wakefield	Founded as a mission in 1854, became a parish in 1871. Current church dedicated in 1980
St. Mary		155 Washington St, Winchester	Founded in 1876 and church dedicated that same year
St. Mary of the Annunciation		46 Myrtle St, Melrose	
St. Mary of the Sacred Heart Parish		Sacred Heart Church, 571 Boston St, Lynn	Established in 1894, current church dedicated in 1912. Now part of St. Mary/Sacred Heart Parish
		St. Mary Church, 8 S. Common St, Lynn	Founded in 1862. Now part of St. Mary/Sacred Heart Parish
St. Patrick		71 Central St, Stoneham	Founded in 1868 for Irish immigrants, current church dedicated in 1887
St. Raphael		512 High St, West Medford	Founded in 1905, current church dedicated in 1993
St. Rose of Lima		601 Broadway, Chelsea	Founded in 1849
St. Stanislaus		171 Chestnut St, Chelsea	Founded in 1905 for Polish immigrants, current church dedicated in 1912
St. Theresa of Lisieux		63 Winter St, North Reading	
Visitation Parish		Sacred Heart Church, 62 School St, Manchester-by-the-Sea	Now part of Visitation Parish
		St. John the Baptist Church, 52 Main St, Essex	Now part of Visitation Parish
Woburn Catholic Collaborative		St. Anthony of Padua Church, 851 Main St, Woburn	Founded as a mission in 1908, current church dedicated in 1928. Now part of Woburn Catholic
		St. Barbara Church, 138 Cambridge Rd, Woburn	Founded in 1954. Now part of Woburn Catholic

=== South Region ===
The South Region covers the South Shore and some adjacent inland areas, in Norfolk and Plymouth Counties (including Plymouth, Quincy, and Weymouth). It is located in the southernmost section of the archdiocese.

Name	Image	Location	Description/Notes
Avon-Holbrook Catholic Collaborative		St. Michael Church, 87 N Main St, Avon	Founded as a parish in 1887, current church dedicated in 1964. Now part of Avon-Holbrook Collaborative
		St. Joseph Church, 153 S Franklin St, Holbrook	Now part of Avon-Holbrook Collaborative
Braintree Catholic Collaborative		St. Clare Church, 1244 Liberty St, Braintree	Founded in 1958. Now part of Braintree Collaborative
		St. Francis of Assisi Church, 856 Washington St, Braintree	Founded in 1903. Now part of Braintree Collaborative
Brockton Catholic Tri-Parish Collaborative		Christ the King Church, 54 Lyman St, Brockton	Founded in 2004 with the merger of Sacred Heart and St. Colman Parishes. Became part of Brockton Collaborative in 2011
		Our Lady of Lourdes Church, 433 West St, Brockton	Became part of Brockton Collaborative in 2011
		St. Edith Stein Church, 71 E. Main St, Brockton	Founded in 2003 with the merger of St. Edward and St. Nicholas Parishes. Became part of Brockton Collaborative in 2011
Catholic Weymouth		Immaculate Conception Church, 1203 Commercial St, Weymouth	Founded in 1882, current church dedicated in 1967. Became part of Catholic Weymouth in 2013
		St. Jerome Church, 632 Bridge St, Weymouth	Became part of Catholic Weymouth in 2013
Christ by the Sea Catholic Collaborative		St. Anthony of Padua Church, 2 Summer St, Cohasset	Founded as a mission in 1866, became a parish in 1866. Current church dedicated in 1964. Became part of Christ by the Sea in 2019
		St. Mary of the Assumption Church, 208 Samoset Ave, Hull	Founded as a mission in 1890, became a parish in 1938. Became part of Christ by the Sea in 2019
Collaborative Parishes of Resurrection and St. Paul		Resurrection Church, 1057 Main St, Hingham	Established in 1957. Now partnered with St. Paul Parish
		St. Paul Church, 147 North St, Hingham	Dedicated in 1871. Now partnered with Resurrection Parish
Divine Mercy Parish		Sacred Heart Church, 386 Hancock St, Quincy	Founded in 1903, became part of Divine Mercy Parish in 2020
		St. Ann Church, 757 Hancock St, Quincy	Founded in 1922, became part of Divine Mercy Parish in 2020
		St. Mary Church, 115 Crescent St, Quincy	Founded in 1840, became part of Divine Mercy Parish in 2020
Holy Apostles Parish		Our Lady of the Lake Church, 575 Monponsett St, Halifax	Now part of Holy Apostles Parish
		St. John the Worker Church, 1 Maquan St, Hanson	Now part of Holy Apostles Parish
Holy Family		601 Tremont St, Duxbury	Founded in 1945, current church dedicated in 1988
Holy Family		403 Union St, Rockland	Founded in 1882, current church dedicated in 1886
Holy Trinity Parish		Most Blessed Sacrament Church, 1031 Sea St, Quincy	Now part of Holy Trinity Parish
		Our Lady of Good Counsel Church, 237 Sea St, Quincy	Now part of Holy Trinity Parish
Light of Christ Catholic Collaborative		St. Bridget Church, 455 Plymouth St, Abington	Current church dedicated in 1863. Now part of Light of Christ Collaborative.
		Holy Ghost Church, 518 Washington St, Whitman	Current church dedicated in 1880. Now part of Light of Christ Collaborative
Mary, Queen of Martyrs Parish		Our Lady of Lourdes Church, 130 Main St, Carver	Became part of Mary, Queen of Martyrs in 2018
		St. Kateri Tekakwitha Church, 126 S Meadow Rd, Plymouth	Founded in 1882, current church dedicated in 1884. Became part of Mary, Queen of Martyrs in 2018
		St. Peter Church, 86 Court St, Plymouth	Became part of Mary, Queen of Martyrs in 2018
Our Lady of the Angels Parish		St. Mary of the Sacred Heart Church, 32 Hanover St, Hanover	Became part of Our Lady of the Angels Parish in 2022
Our Lady of the Assumption / St. Ann by the Sea		Our Lady of the Assumption Church, 40 Canal St, Marshfield	Partnered with St. Ann by the Sea Parish
		St. Ann by the Sea Church, 587 Ocean St, Marshfield	Partnered with Our Lady of the Assumption Parish
Our Lady Queen of Peace Collaborative		St. Thomas More Church, 7 Hawthorn Rd, Braintree	Founded in 1938. Became part of Our Lady Collaborative in 2022
		Sacred Heart Church, 72 Washington St, Weymouth	Founded in 1869. Became part of Our Lady Collaborative in 2022
Our Lady of the Visitation Parish		St. Elizabeth Church, 350 Reedsdale Rd, Milton	Now part of Our Lady of the Visitation Parish
		St. Mary of the Hills Church, 29 St. Mary's Rd, Milton	Now part of Our Lady of the Visitation Parish
St. Agatha		432 Adams St, Milton	Founded in 1922, current church dedicated in 1936
St. Albert the Great and St. Francis Xavier Collaborative		St. Albert the Great Church, 1140 Washington St, Weymouth	Founded in 1950, church dedicated in 1954. Now part of St. Albert/St. Francis Collaborative
		St. Francis Xavier Church, 234 Pleasant St, South Weymouth	Became part of part of St. Albert/St. Francis Collaborative in
St. Ann		103 N. Main St, West Bridgewater	Established in 1927
St. Christine		1295 Main St, Marshfield	Founded in 1944, current church dedicated in 1960
St. Bernadette		1031 N. Main St, Randolph	
St. Bonaventure		803 State Rd, Plymouth	
St. Isidore Parish		Sts. Martha & Mary Church, 354 Bedford St, Lakeville	Founded in 1958, became part of St. Isidore Parish in 2021
		Sacred Heart Church, 340 Center St, Middleborough	Founded in 1885, became part of St. Isidore Parish in 2021
St. John the Baptist and St. Joseph Parishes		St. John the Baptist Church, 44 School St, Quincy	Now partnered with St. Joseph Parish
		St. Joseph Church, 550 Washington St, Quincy	Now partnered with St. John Parish
St. John the Evangelist		210 Central St, East Bridgewater	Founded as a mission in 1863, became a parish in 1903. Current church dedicated in 1955
St. Oscar Romero		700 Washington St, Canton	Founded as St. John the Evangelist in the 1860s, became St. Oscar Romero Parish in 2021
Stoughton Catholic Parishes		Immaculate Conception Church, 122 Canton St, Stoughton	Now part of Stoughton Catholic Parishes
		St. James Church, 560 Page St, Stoughton	Now part of Stoughton Catholic Parishes
St. Mary		211 N. Main St, Randolph	Founded in 1851, current church dedicated in 1989
Sts. Mary and Joseph Collaborative		St. Joseph Church, 272 Main St, Kingston	Now partnered with St. Mary Parish
		St. Mary Church, 313 Court St, Plymouth	Founded in 1915. Now partnered with St. Joseph Parish
St. Mary of the Nativity		1 Kent St, Scituate	
St. Patrick		335 Main St, Brockton	Church dedicated in 1859
St. Pius X		101 Wolcott Rd, Milton	Founded in 1954 and church dedicated that same year. Now part of Catholic Parishes of the Blue Hills
St. Thomas Aquinas		103 Center St, Bridgewater	Founded in the 1840s, church dedicated in 1860

=== West Region ===
The West Region covers the MetroWest Area and the Route 128 tech corridor, including Framingham, Newton, and Waltham. It is located in the western sections of the archdiocese.

Name	Image	Location	Description/Notes
Apple Valley Catholic Community		St. Elizabeth of Hungary Church, 89 Arlington St, Acton	Now part of Apple Valley
		St. Isidore Church, 429 Great Rd, Stow	Now part of Apple Valley
Ascension Parish		St. Bridget Church, 1 Percival St, Maynard	
		Our Lady of Fatima Church, 160 Concord Rd, Sudbury	
Catholic Parishes of Lexington		Sacred Heart Church, 6 Follen Rd, Lexington	Founded as a mission for Italian immigrants in 1927, current church dedicated in 1949. Now part of Catholic Parishes of Lexington
		St. Brigid Church, 1981 Massachusetts Ave, Lexington	Founded as a mission in 1848 for Irish immigrants, became a parish in 1886. Current church dedicated in 1957. Now part of Catholic Parishes of Lexington
Concord-Carlisle Catholic Collaborative		St. Irene Church, 181 East St, Carlisle	Now part of Concord-Carlisle Collaborative
		Holy Family Church, 12 Monument Square, Concord	Founded in 2004 with the merger of Our Lady of Christians and St. Bernard Parishes. Now part of Concord-Carlisle Collaborative
Corpus Christi-St. Bernard		1523 Washington St, West Newton	Founded in 2006 with the merger of St. Bernard and Corpus Christi Parishes.
Good Shepherd Parish		St. Ann Church, 134 Cochituate Rd, Wayland	Now part of Good Shepherd Parish
		St. Zepherin Church, 99 Main St, Wayland	Founded in 1889. Now part of Good Shepherd Parish
Immaculate Conception		11 Prospect St, Marlborough	Founded in 1850, church dedicated in 1871
Mary Immaculate of Lourdes		270 Elliot St, Newton	Founded as St. Mary in 1870, church dedicated in 1910 as Mary Immaculate of Lourdes.
Medfield & Norfolk Catholic Collaborative		St. Edward the Confessor Church, 133 Spring St, Medfield	Founded as a mission in 1893, became a parish in 1901. Current church dedicated in 1980. Became part of Medfield/Norfolk Collaborative in 2014
		St. Jude Church, 86 Main St, Norfolk	Founded in 1959. Became part of Medfield/Norfolk Collaborative in 2014
Most Precious Blood & St. Theresa Parish		Most Precious Blood Church, 30 Centre St, Dover	Founded in 1960. Merged with St. Theresa Parish in 2010
		St. Theresa Church, 35 S. Main St, Sherborn	Founded as a mission in 1924, became a parish in 1945. Current church dedicated in 1993. Merged with Most Precious Blood Parish in 2010
Natick Catholic Community		St. Linus Church, 119 Hartford St, Natick	Now part of Natick Community
		St. Patrick Church, 44 E. Central St, Natick	Founded in 1852, current church dedicated in 1892.. Now part of Natick Community
New Roads Catholic Community		St. Luke Church, 132 Lexington St, Belmont	Now part of New Roads Community
		St. Joseph Church, 130 Common Street, Belmont	Founded in 1949
Our Lady Comforter of the Afflicted		920 Trapelo Rd, Waltham	Founded in 1930, current church dedicated in 1963
Our Lady of Sorrows		59 Cottage St, Sharon	Founded as a mission in 1869, became a parish in 1906.
Plainville-Wrentham Catholic Collaborative		St. Martha Church, 227 South St, Plainville	Founded in 1951, current church dedicated in 1953. Now part of Plainville-Wrentham Collaborative
		St. Mary Church, 130 South St, Wrentham	Parish founded and church dedicated in 1928. Now part of Plainville-Wrentham Collaborative
Sacred Heart		311 River St, Waltham	Founded in 1922 by the Stigmatine Fathers. Current church started in 1958
Sacred Heart and Our Lady's Collaborative		Our Lady Help of Christians Church, 573 Washington St, Newton	Dedicated in 1881. Now part of Sacred Heart/Our Lady's Collaborative
		Sacred Heart Church, 1317 Centre St, Newton	Dedicated in 1891. Now part of Sacred Heart/Our Lady's Collaborative
St. Antoine Davelui		45 Ash St, Auburndale (Newton)	Found in 2013 for Korean immigrants
St. Blaise		1158 S. Main St, Bellingham	Founded in 1962
St. Bridget		830 Worcester Rd, Framingham	Founded in 1878, current church dedicated in 1931
St. Cecilia		54 Etsy St, Ashland	Founded as a mission in 1857, became a parish in 1884. Current church dedicated in 1960 or 1961
St. Brendan		384 Hartford Ave, Bellingham	Founded in 1895
St. Catherine of Siena		549 Washington St, Norwood	Founded in 1890
St. George		74 School St, Framingham	Church dedicated in 1848
St. Ignatius Loyola		28 Commonwealth Ave, Chestnut Hill	Founded by the Jesuit Order in 1926 to serve Boston College and the local community. Current church dedicated in 1951
St. Joan of Arc Parish		St. Denis Church, 157 Washington St, Westwood	Now part of Joan of Arc Parish
		St. Margaret Mary Church, 845 High St, Westwood	Now part of Joan of Arc Parish
St. John the Evangelist		20 Church St, Hopkinton	Founded in 1866, current church dedicated in 1889
St. John-St Paul Catholic Collaborative		St. John the Evangelist Church, 9 Glen Rd, Wellesley	Became part of St. John - St. Paul Collaborative in 2015
		St. Paul Church, 502 Washington St, Wellesley	Founded as a mission in 1912, current church started in 2016. Became part of St. John - St. Paul Collaborative in 2015
St. Joseph		151 Village St, Medway	
St. Joseph		1382 Highland Ave, Needham	Founded as a mission in the 1850s, became a parish in 1890. Current church dedicated in 1966
St. Jude		147 Main St, Waltham	Founded in 1949, current church dedicated in 1952
St. Julia		374 Boston Post Rd, Weston	
St. Mary		58 Carpenter St, Foxborough	Founded in 1959
St. Mary		1 Church Square, Franklin	Founded as a mission church in 1871, became a parish in 1877. Current church dedicated in 1927
St. Mary		708 Washington St, Holliston	Church dedicated in 1883
St. Mary of the Assumption		25 Avery St, Dedham	Founded in 1857, current church dedicated in 1900
St. Mary		133 School St, Waltham	Founded in 1835, church started construction in 1858
St. Matthias		409 Hemenway St, Marlborough	
St. Michael		90 Concord Rd, Bedford	
St. Michael		20 High St, Hudson	Gothic style church built in 1889
St. Stephen		221 Concord St, Framingham	
St. Susanna		262 Needham St, Dedham	
St. Tarcisius		562 Waverly St, Framingham	Founded in 1908
St. Thomas the Apostle		82 Exchange St, Millis	Parish founded and church consecrated in 1937
St. Timothy		650 Nichols St, Norwood	Founded in 1962, current church dedicated in 1963
St. Veronica Parish		St. Malachy Church, 99 Bedford St, Burlington	Parish founded and church dedicated in 1964. Now part of St. Veronica Parish
		St. Margaret Church, 111 Winn St, Burlington	Now part of St. Veronica Parish
Walpole Catholic Collaborative		Blessed Sacrament Church, 10 Diamond St, Walpole	Now part of Walpole Collaborative
		St. Mary Church, 176 Washington St, East Walpole	Now part of Walpole Collaborative
Watertown Catholic		Sacred Heart Church, 770 Mount Auburn St, Watertown	Now part of Watertown Catholic
		St. Patrick Church, 212 Main St, Watertown	Founded as a mission in 1837, became a parish in 1847. Current church dedicated in 1906. Now part of Watertown Catholic

== Former churches ==
Name	Image	Location	Description/Notes
Holy Cross Cathedral		Franklin Street, Boston	Dedicated in 1803, Holy Cross was the first Catholic church in Boston, it became the first cathedral in the new diocese in 1808. It was closed in 1860 and later demolished.
Our Lady of Mount Carmel		128 Gove St, Boston (East Boston)	Closed in 2004, parishioners kept seven-year vigil to prevent sale of building by archdiocese. Building finally sold in 2015
Church of the Immaculate Conception		775 Harrison Ave, Boston (South End)	The original collegiate church of Boston College, designed by Patrick Keely and dedicated in 1861. Closed in 2007 and later converted to residential use
St. Charles Borromeo		30 Taylor St, Waltham	Closed in 2021
St. Helen Church		383 Washington St, Norwell	Closed in 2022 and sold to the Town of Norwell
