= St. Mary's Roman Catholic Church Complex =

St. Mary's Roman Catholic Church Complex may refer to:

- St. Mary's Catholic Church (Davenport, Iowa), listed on the U.S. National Register of Historic Places (NRHP) as St. Mary's Roman Catholic Church Complex
- St. Mary's Roman Catholic Church Complex (Waltham, Massachusetts), also NRHP-listed

== See also ==
- St. Mary's Roman Catholic Church (disambiguation)
