= Shrine of St. Anthony (Boston) =

Coordinates: 42.3547°N 71.0585°W

St. Anthony Shrine
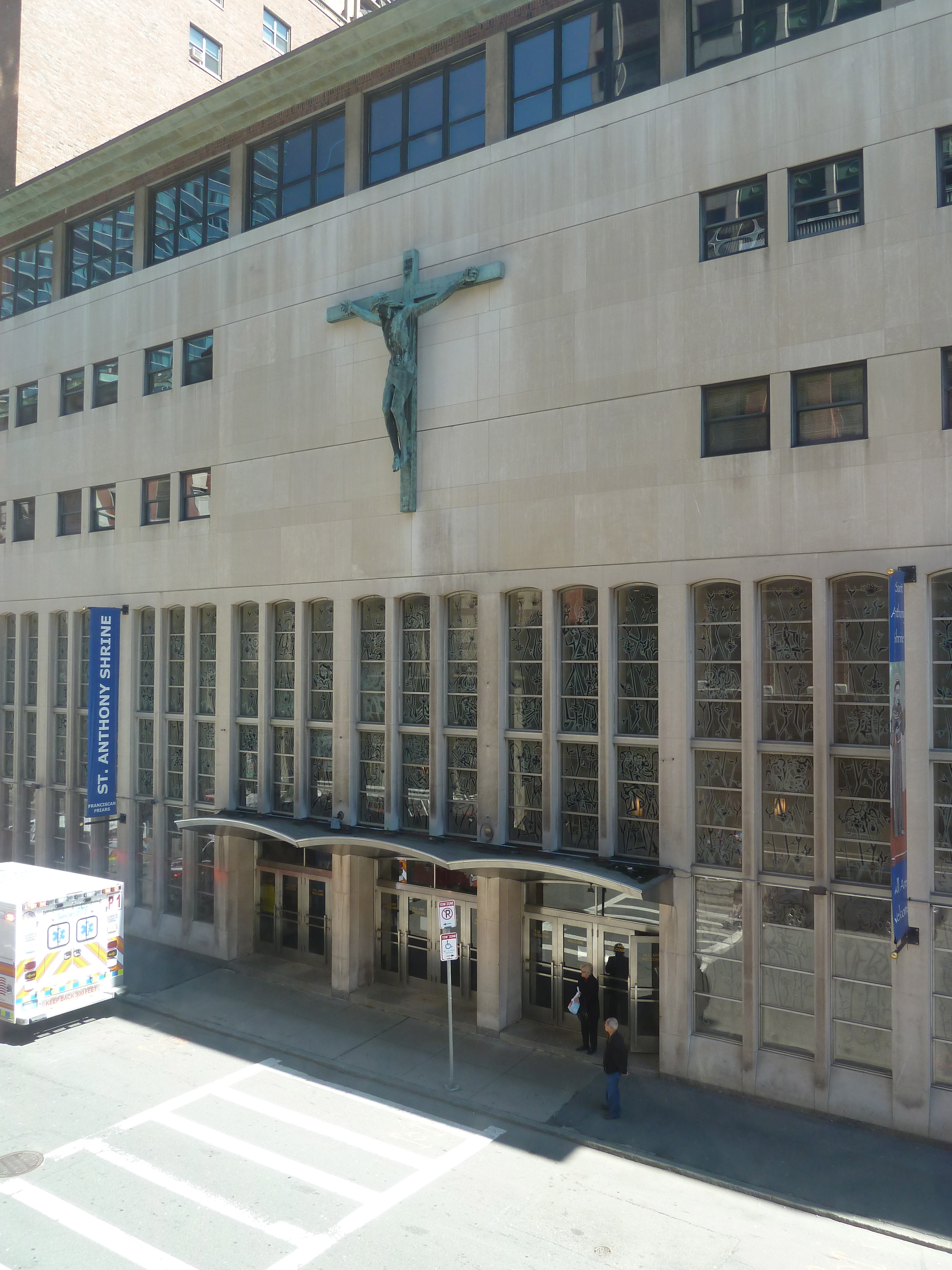

General information
- Location: 100 Arch St. Boston, MA 02110
- Completed: Nov. 23, 1955

Website
- https://stanthonyshrine.org/

St. Anthony's Shrine, the "Church on Arch Street," is a center for Roman Catholic ministry in Boston, Massachusetts directed by the Franciscan friars of Holy Name Province. The Shrine has served the residents and workers of Boston since its completion in 1955, the community is driven by its dedication to the mission of "welcoming all people through prayer and outreach."

== History ==
=== Construction and early years ===
The friars had been serving in the Boston area since 1860. The Archbishop of Boston donated his former mansion in Brookline to them in 1927, which they then converted into St. Francis Friary, a retreat house for laymen which opened the following year. In 1944, shortly after being appointed archbishop, Richard Cushing suggested that the friars open a chapel of ease in the downtown area of the city.

The friars agreed and in 1945 began to hear confessions in the Oratory of St. Thomas More, which was served by the secular clergy of the Archdiocese of Boston. Plans proceeded with establishing their own chapel, for which a small, four-story building was acquired on 103 Arch Street to serve as a temporary chapel. A number of connecting lots across the street were soon also purchased by Holy Name Province of the friars.

Construction of the first spaces for a new chapel begin during the summer of 1946 and the temporary shrine was opened on February 19, 1947, Ash Wednesday of that year, and thus could accommodate the large numbers of faithful who sought the imposition of blessed ashes as per custom on that day. The first rector was the Rev. Harold R. Blake, O.F.M., who supervised a group of eight friars who commuted daily from the friary in Brookline for the first few months of operation. The decision was made to name the new chapel for St. Anthony, who had been declared a Doctor of the Church earlier that year by Pope Pius XII.

The friars moved into the basement of the first lot they had bought, living in the basement while work began preparing a new friary for them. The work was continuous. By the end of the first year of operation, it was estimated that approximately 300,000 confessions had been heard. Some 6,000 were heard by just 25 priests on Christmas Eve 1947 alone.

The final stage of construction of the permanent chapel was begun with a groundbreaking ceremony in October 1952 which was presided over by Cushing and the civil officials of the city. The architect was a friar of the Province, Brother Cajetan Baumann, O.F.M., known for the many churches and friaries he designed throughout the country. The cornerstone of the chapel was laid a year later, and was completed in time for its opening on December 31, 1954, at a final cost of $4.5 million. The mosaic behind the altar was conceived and executed by American Modernist painter Peppino Mangravite.

The chapel and friary were dedicated on November 23, 1955, by Cushing, who by then had been made an official affiliate of the friars, granted to individuals of particular help to the Order.

=== St. Francis House ===
In 1981 the friars opened a breadline, providing a free lunch to those in need; two years later they were serving some 200 people daily. Louis Canino, OFM the rector at the time, decided on a more comprehensive approach. He arranged the purchase of an eleven-story building several blocks away, on Boylston Street. St. Francis House, as the new facility was called, allowed friars and lay volunteers to offer sit-down meals. St. Francis House was dedicated in 1984. The center began hiring a professional staff providing clothing, psychological services, and nursing care as well. St. Francis House has since created its own board of directors and is a separate non-profit, but the friars and the Shrine have still remained connected with the people and the work there.

Since its formation, St. Francis House has become the largest day center for homeless individuals in Massachusetts, serving an average of 500 impoverished or homeless people per day, and operating throughout the year. It has also expanded its services, offering a host of basic services including food, toiletries, clothing, and sanitation. St. Francis House also offers rehabilitative services, including workforce development, housing services, and recovery support.

== See also ==
- List of churches in the Roman Catholic Archdiocese of Boston
