= Our Lady of Czestochowa Parish, Boston =

Our Lady of Czestochowa Parish
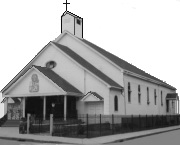
- Our Lady of Czestochowa Parish
- 42°19′40″N 71°03′26″W
- Location: Dorchester, Boston, Massachusetts
- Country: United States
- Denomination: Catholic Church
- Website: ourladyofczestochowa.com

History
- Founded: October 2, 1893
- Founder: Polish immigrants
- Dedication: Black Madonna of Częstochowa
- Dedicated: November 18, 1894

Administration
- Division: Vicariate II
- District: Central Pastoral Region
- Province: Boston
- Archdiocese: Boston

Clergy
- Archbishop: Richard Henning
- Vicar: Andrzej Treder
- Pastor: Jerzy Żebrowski

Our Lady of Czestochowa Parish is a Catholic parish in Boston, Massachusetts, United States, on Dorchester Ave, founded in 1893 and designated for Polish immigrants.

== Child pornography arrest ==
In 2012 Andrzej Urbaniak was suspended as the parish priest after he was charged with possession of child pornography on a parish computer. He was arrested while downloading child pornography and admitted to the police that he had downloaded and shared it.

== Bibliography ==
- Our Lady of Czestochowa Parish; Sophie Kulik; Stanley Sadowski (1993). Our Lady of Czestochowa Parish - Centennial 1893-1993. Boston, Massachusetts: Our Lady of Czestochowa Parish.
