= Edward T. P. Graham =

American architect

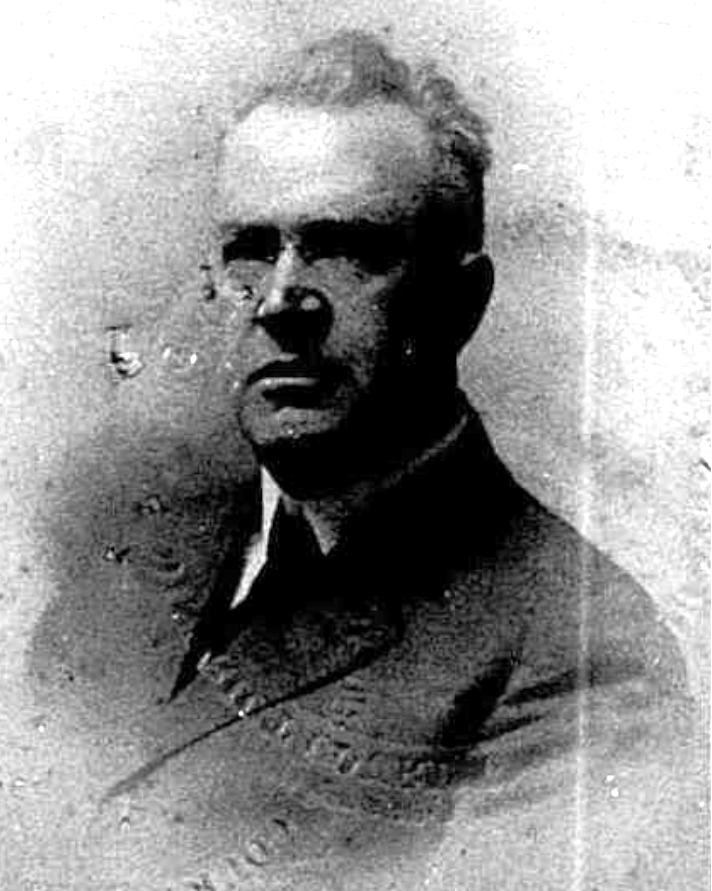
- Graham in 1924
- Born: February 2, 1872; Cambridge, Massachusetts, U.S.
- Died: September 3, 1964 (aged 92)
- Education: Harvard College S.B. (1900); Boston College M.A. (1915)
- Occupation: Architect
- Buildings: Holy Name Church; Mary Immaculate of Lourdes Church; St. Mary's Church; St. Paul Church

Edward T. P. Graham (February 2, 1872 – September 3, 1964) was an American architect best known for his design of Roman Catholic churches in Boston, Massachusetts and throughout the Midwest.

== Early life ==
Graham was born in Cambridge, Massachusetts on February 2, 1872, the son of Thomas Augustus Graham and Helena (Kenny) Graham. He attended Cambridge High School and Harvard University, where he received an S.B. degree in 1900, and Boston College where he received a master's degree in 1915.

== European travels and associations ==
In 1901 Graham received the first Austin Traveling Fellowship under which he traveled and studied in Europe for the next two years. Then he worked for one year with Peabody and Stearns of Boston before opening an office of his own there, with an office later also in Cleveland, Ohio where he was associated with the firm of F. Stillman Fish. He made his home first in Brookline and then, for the last forty-five years of his life, at 67 Oxford Street, Cambridge.

== Legacy ==
During his long career he designed many schools, hospitals, churches, and public buildings for states and cities in New England and the Midwest. Among them were in Boston: The Forsyth Dental Infirmary, City Hall Annex, two buildings of the City Hospital, the Registry of Motor Vehicles; in Cambridge, the Church of St. Paul, and five buildings for St. Elizabeth Hospital, Brighton. In Harvard's Twenty-fifth Anniversary Report he wrote, "As to style in architecture, I believe that the free mediaeval styles offer the best field for further development of architecture in any country, our own included. There is formalism in the Renaissance and all since attempted in its manner, which is crippling, and restricting. Structure, dressed in transparent rather than opaque robes, is what should be followed in building."

== Death ==
Graham continued in his practice as an architect until a short time before his death, in Boston on September 3, 1964. At the time of his death Graham was described as "the dean of Boston architects."

== Notable works ==
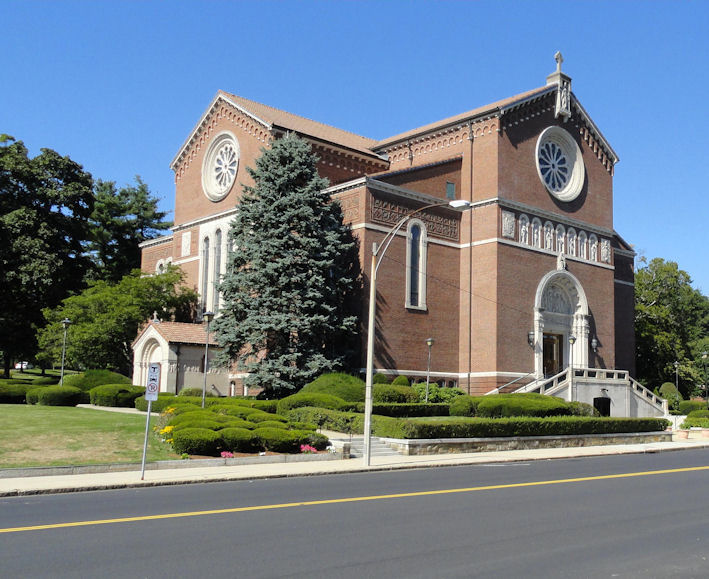
Holy Name Church West Roxbury, MA

- Church of the Holy Name, West Roxbury, MA
- Our Lady Of Lourdes Church, Jamaica Plain, MA
- St. John Church, Winthrop, MA
- St. Paul Church, Cambridge, Massachusetts
- Mary Immaculate of Lourdes Church, Newton, MA
- St. Philip Neri Church, Newton, MA (demolished 2017)
- St. Joseph Church, Quincy, MA
- St. Anthony Church, Revere, MA
- St. Anthony's-by-the-Sea, Gloucester, MA
- St. James Church Medford, MA
- Holy Rosary Church, Lawrence, MA
- Sacred Heart Church, Lexington, MA
- St. Paul Church, Hamilton, MA
- Holy Ghost Church, Whitman, MA
- St. Coleman Church, Brockton, MA
- St Margaret Church, Burlington, MA (Graham's last church)
- St. Mary Church, Akron, OH
- St. Joseph Church, Canton, OH
- St. Ignatius of Antioch Church, Cleveland, OH (with F. Stillman Fish)
- St. James Church, Cleveland, OH
- St. Cyril and Methdius Church, Lakewood, OH
- Our Lady of Peace Church, Cleveland, OH
- St. Patrick Church, Youngstown, OH
- Church of the Annunciation, Cincinnati, OH
- St. Malachy Church, Near West Side neighborhood, Chicago, IL
- St. Agnes Parish Center, Chicago, IL
- Chapel, St John Preparatory School, Danvers, MA
- Boy's Latin School, Cleveland, Ohio
- St. Mary's Church (Dedham, Massachusetts) rectory
- St. Mary's Church and Convent (1907), Cambridge, MA

== Buildings by Edward T. P Graham ==
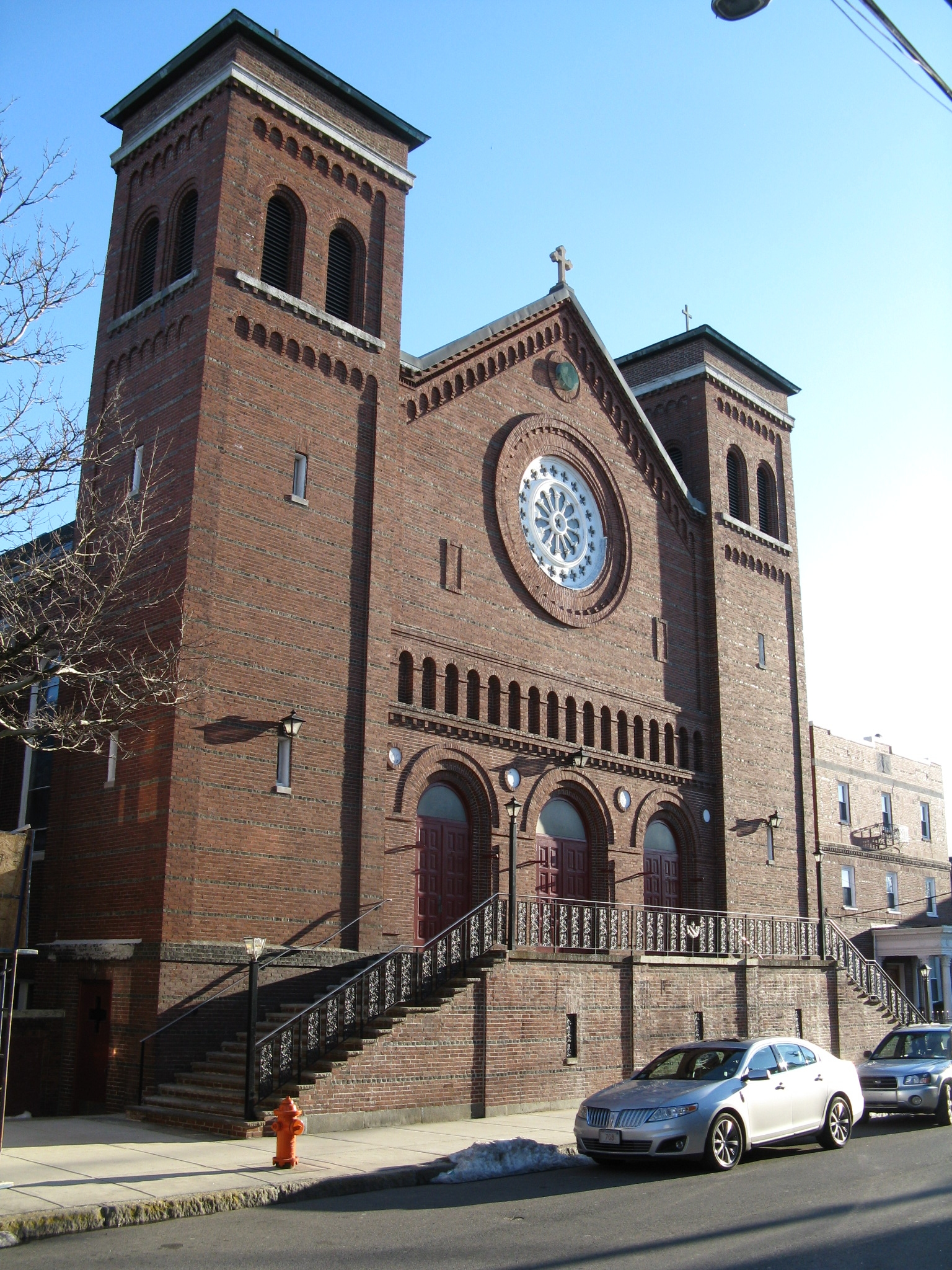
St Stanislaus Bishop and Martyrs Church, Chelsea MA

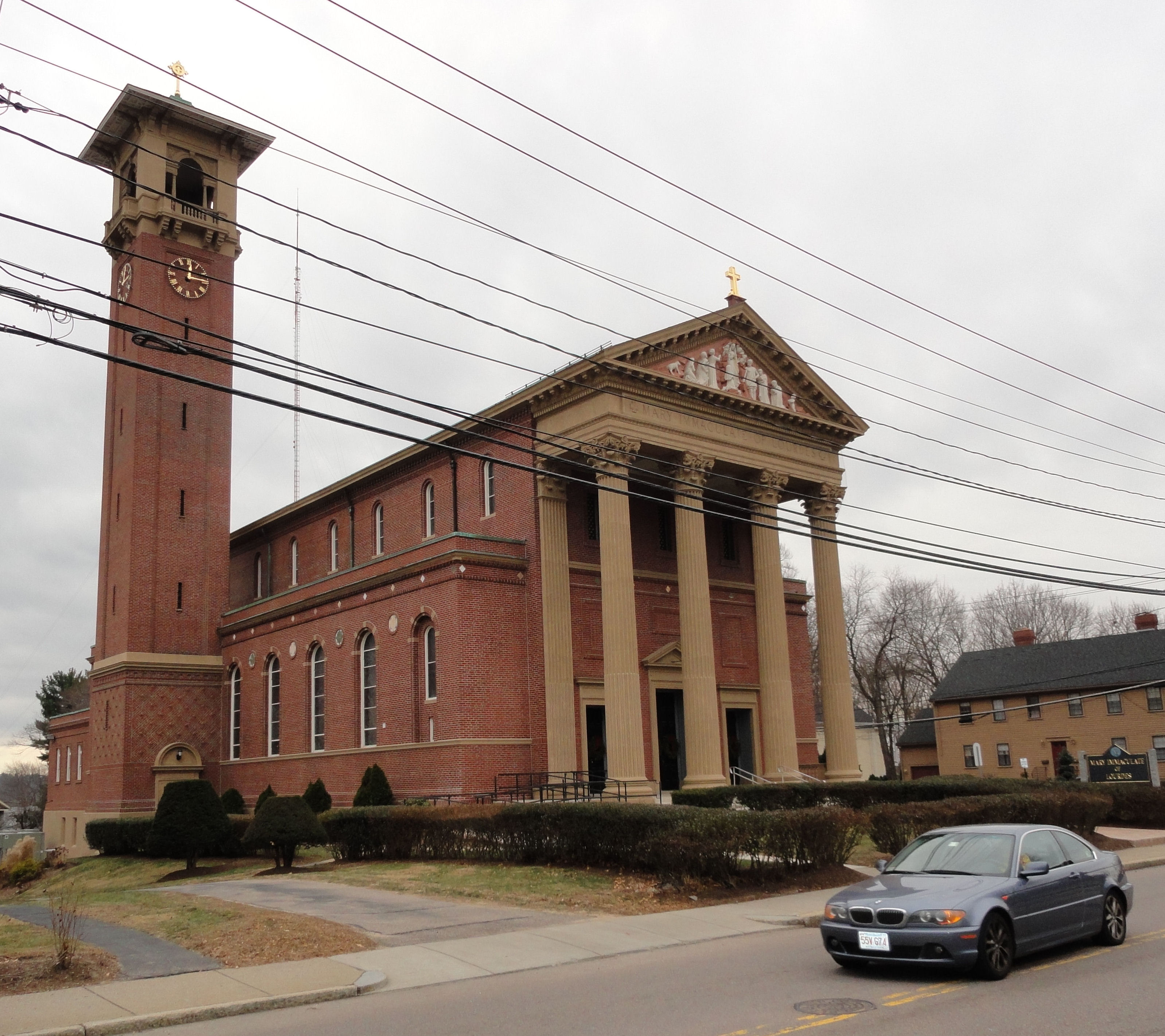
Mary Immaculate of Lourdes Church, Newton MA

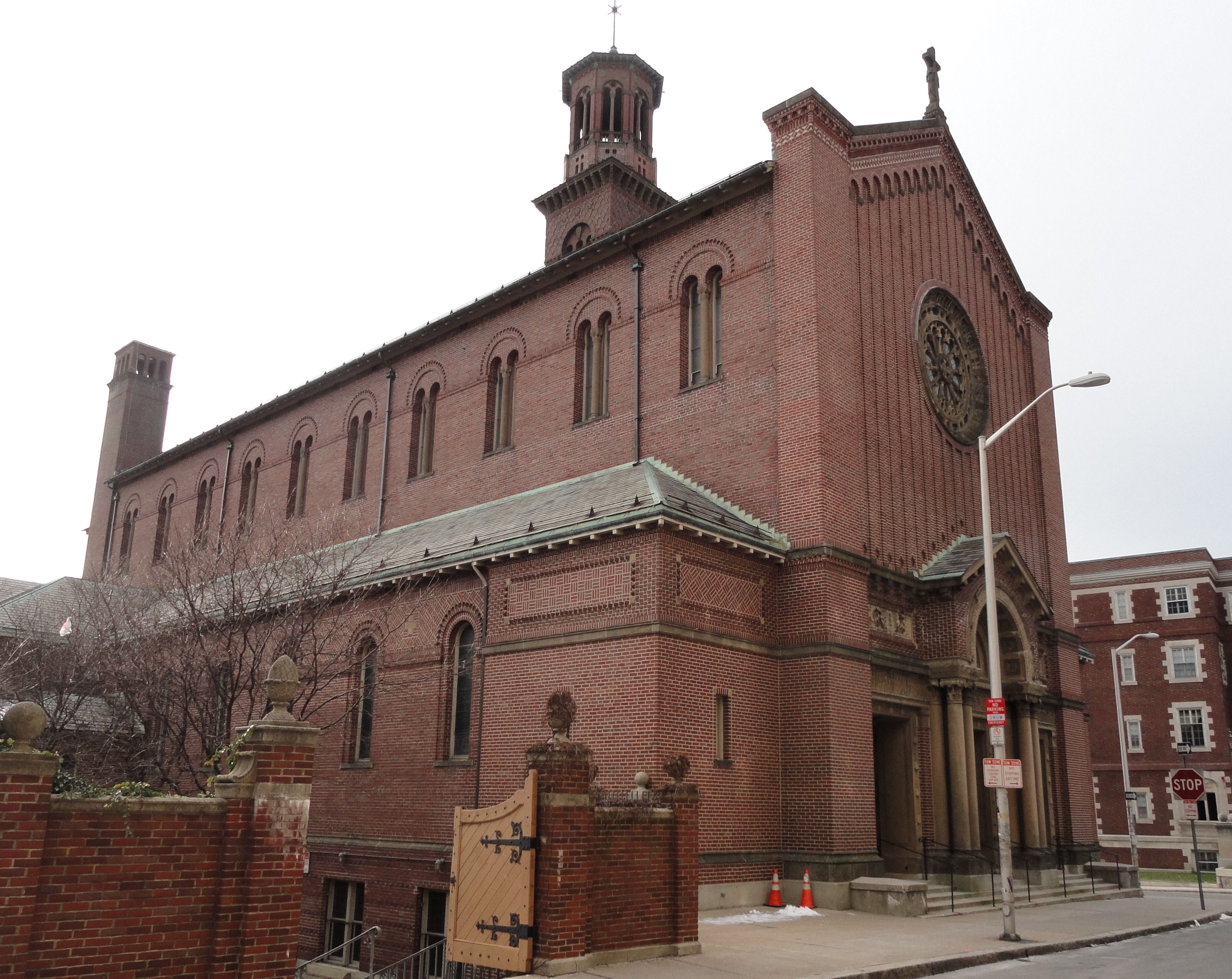
St. Paul Church, Cambridge MA

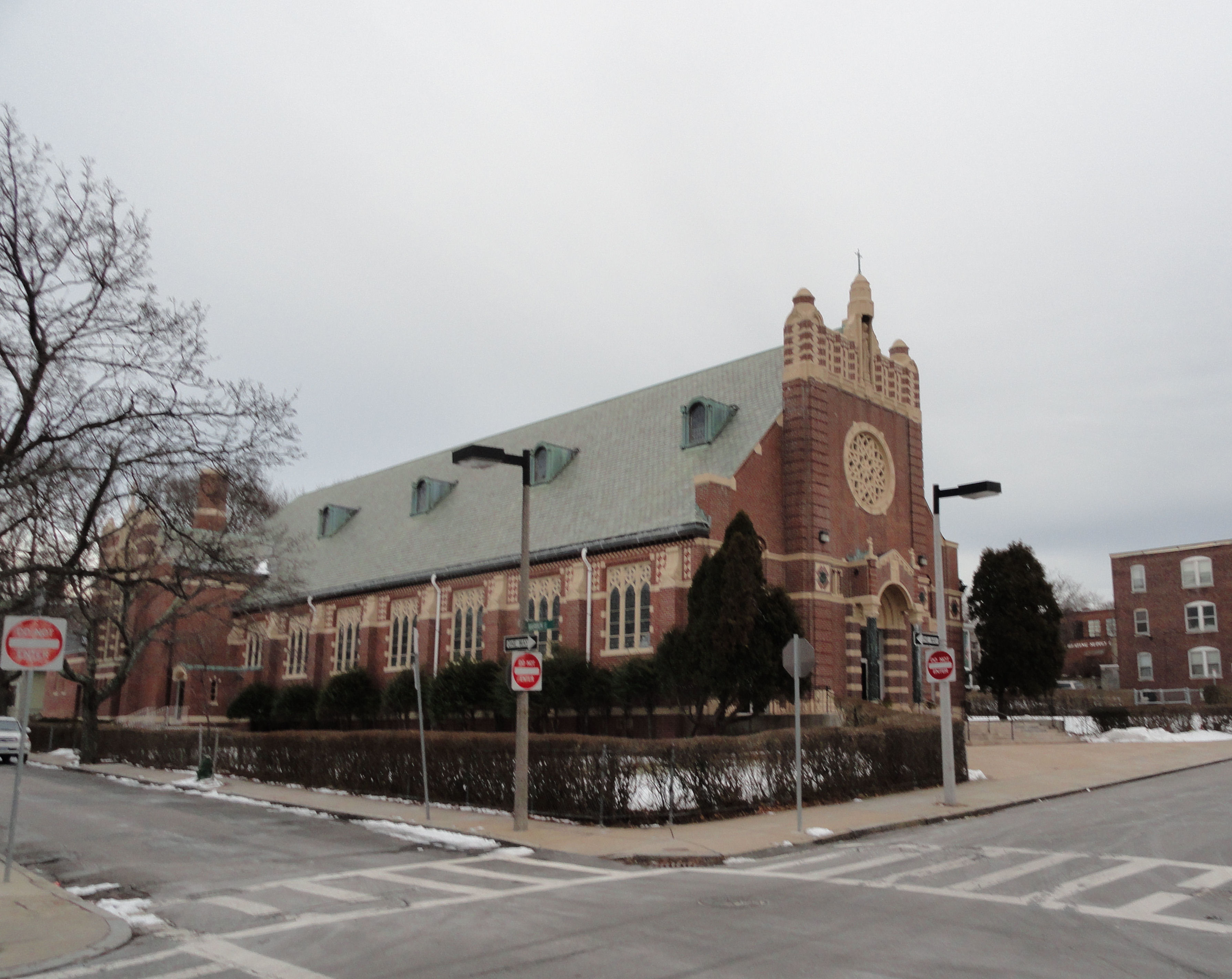
Our Lady of Lourdes Church, Jamaica Plain, MA

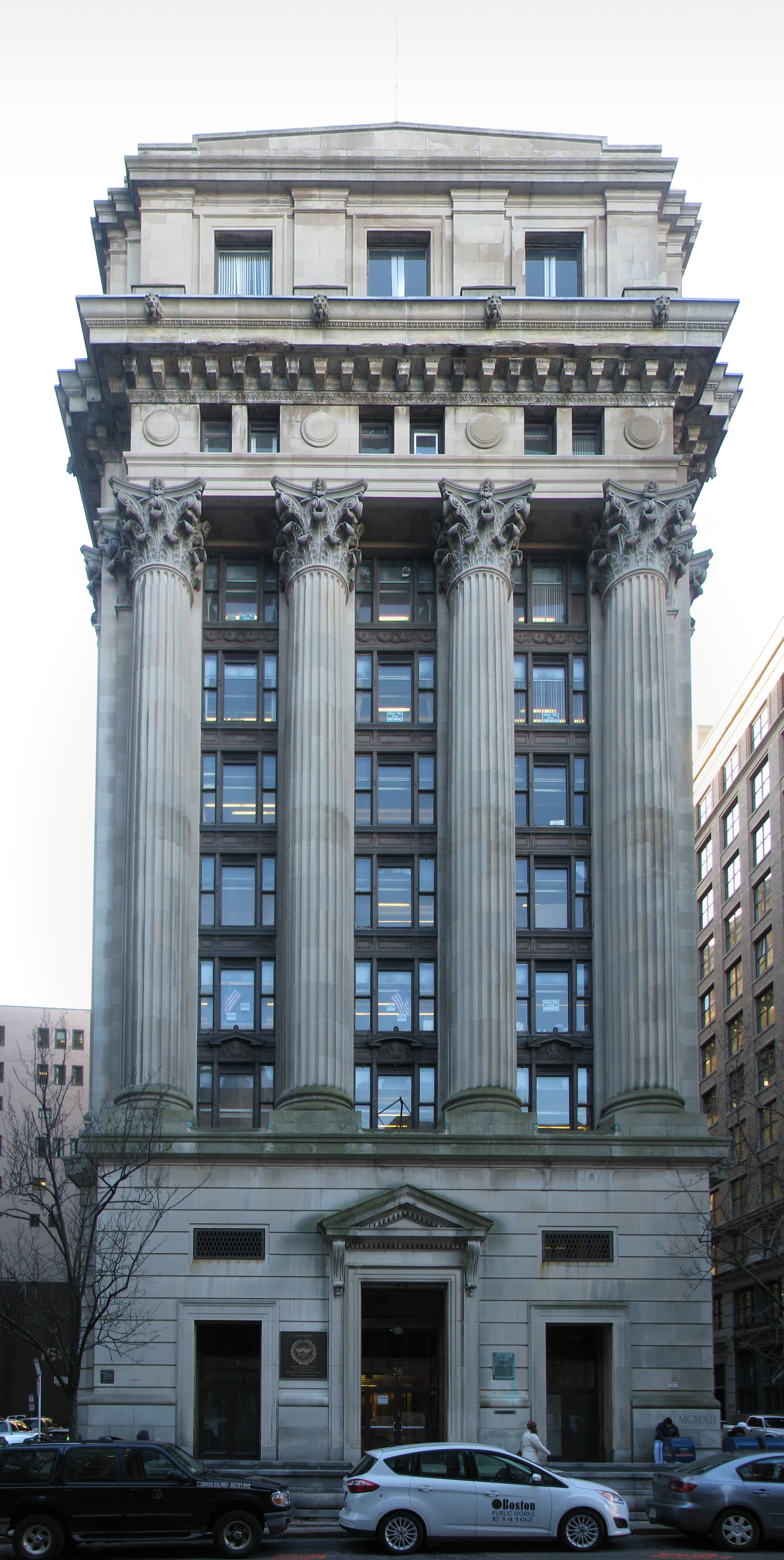
Boston City Hall Annex, Boston, MA

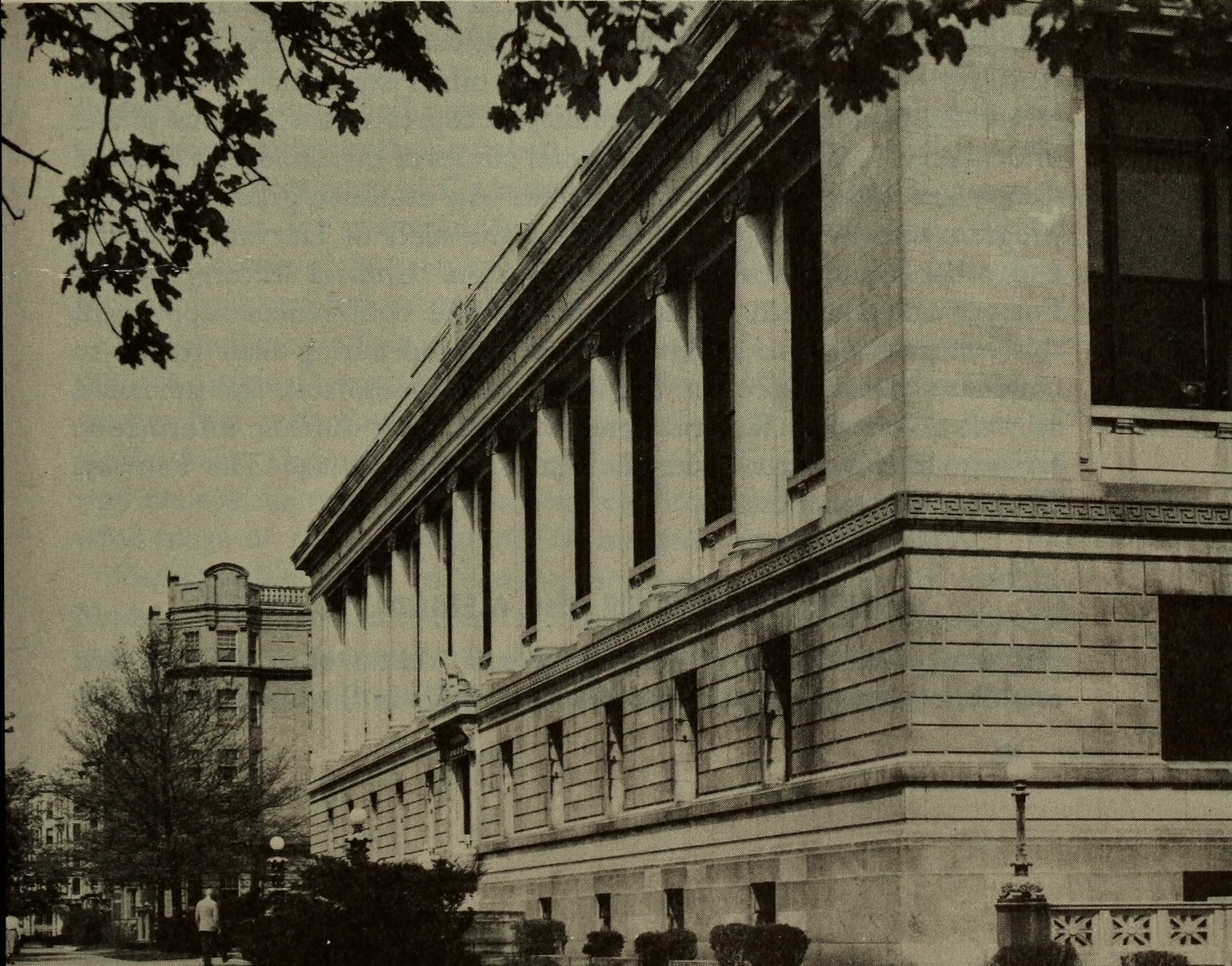
Forsyth Dental Infirmary, Boston, MA
