= Holy Name Church (West Roxbury, Massachusetts) =

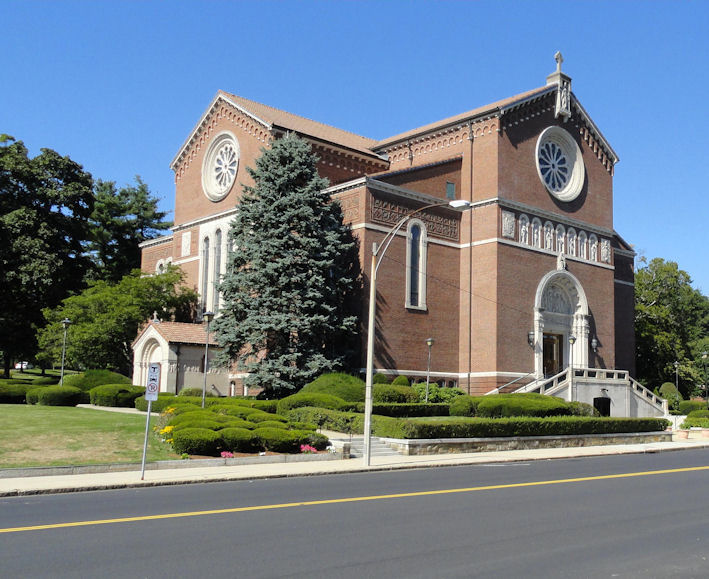

- Location of Holy Name Church in West Roxbury, MA Holy Name Church (the United States)
- 42°17′17.3″N 71°08′48.1″W
- Location: 1689 Centre Street; West Roxbury, Massachusetts
- Country: United States
- Denomination: Roman Catholic
- Website: Parish website

History
- Founded: 1927

Architecture
- Architect: Edward T. P. Graham

Administration
- Province: Boston
- Archdiocese: Boston

Clergy
- Archbishop: Archbishop Richard Garth Henning
- Pastor: Father TK Macdonald

Holy Name Church in West Roxbury is a Roman Catholic church of the Archdiocese of Boston.

Among the largest and most distinguished buildings in the western section of Boston, the imposing Romanesque Revival church dominates the rotary where it is located and provides an interesting contrast to the Gothic St. Theresa Roman Catholic Church, a mile down Centre Street. Holy Name Church is a relatively large building with an upper and lower church.

== Founding and early development ==
The parish was founded in 1927 under the leadership of Fr. William P. McNamara, the first pastor. It was developed from Sacred Heart in Roslindale and St. Teresa in West Roxbury. Prior to the construction of a church, services were held in the Bellevue Community Theatre in Roslindale.

Although the basement church was ready for Midnight Mass in 1929 work on the superstructure progressed more slowly and the church was not completed until 1939.

December 1942 saw the funeral of a number of victims of the Cocoanut Grove fire at Holy Name.

In 1944, during renovations at Holy Cross Cathedral, ordinations were held at Holy Name.

== Architecture ==
The architect of the church was Edward T. P. Graham who designed many Roman Catholic churches in Boston and the Midwest. The design of the dome in the main sanctuary is replicated from that of the Basilica di San Clemente in Rome. St. Clemente had been the titular church of Boston Cardinal William Henry O'Connell when Holy Name was built. Above the entrance is a frieze with niches holding statues of saints.

== Holy Name Complex ==
A large Colonial Revival style rectory, also designed by Graham, is situated directly behind the church. The Holy Name Elementary School, Parish Hall and Convent designed in 1953 by architects Perry, Shaw and Hepburn is located directly across the street.

The stained glass was provided by the studios of Wilbur H. Burnham, Boston who would also supply glass to St. Theresa Church of West Roxbury.

== Pipe organ ==
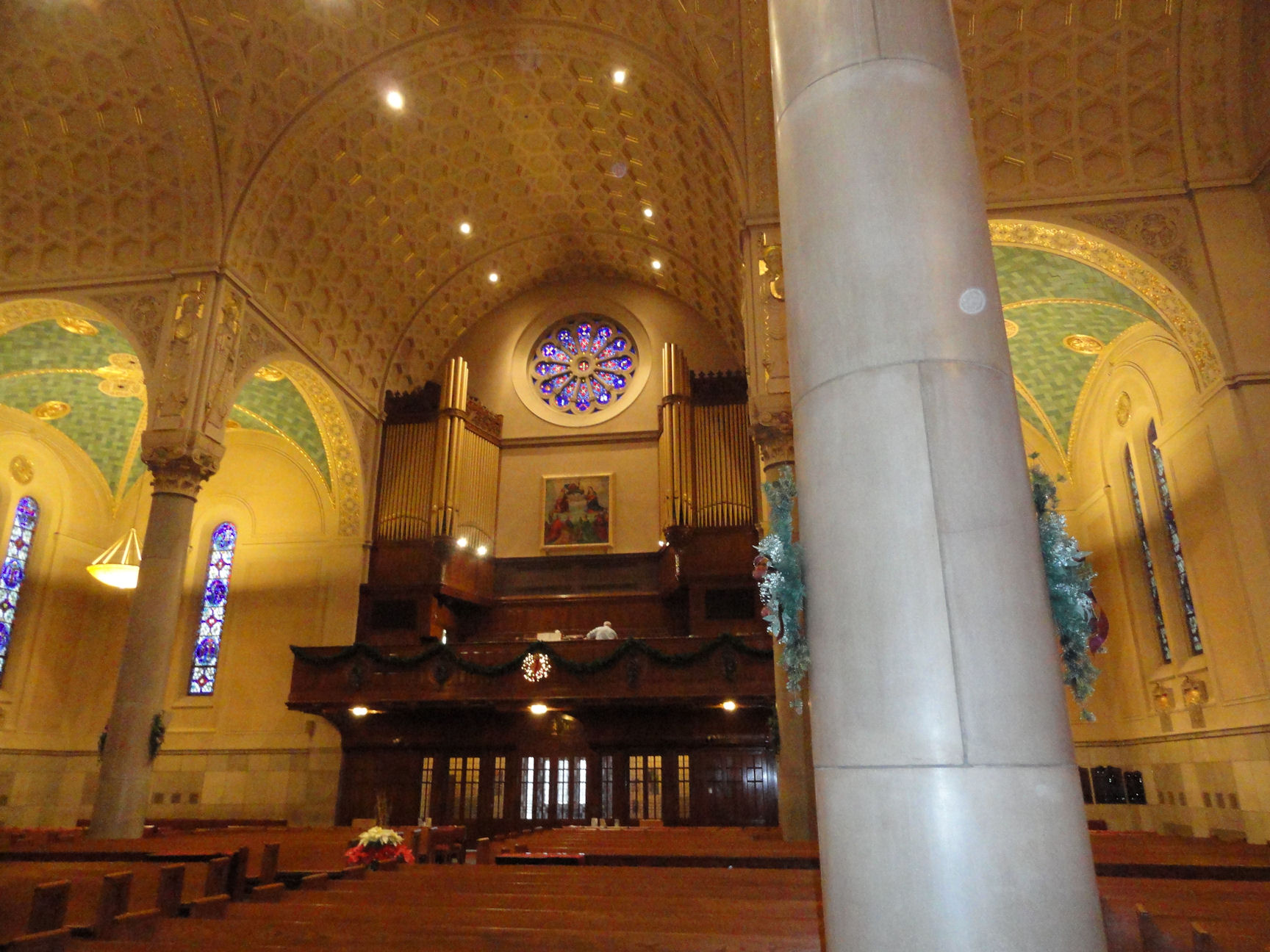
The Wicks organ, designed by Heny Vincent Willis

In 1938 the church became home to one of the most distinguished organs in Boston, a large 3 manual organ opus 1691 built by the Wicks Organ Company It was designed by Henry Vincent Willis, grandson of "Father" Willis of the prestigious British organ building firm. Henry Vincent Willis was the tonal designer for Wicks at the time.

Prior to his employment at Wicks, Willis had worked for the Midmar-Losh Organ Company where he was heavily involved in the development of the largest organ in the World, the Boardwalk Hall Auditorium Organ in the Atlantic City Convention Center.

The pipes are divided between two large cases in the gallery and a separate 16 rank instrument located in the sanctuary. Both organs are controlled by twin 3-manual drawknob consoles, one in the gallery and the second in the sanctuary directly behind the altar.

The organ was one of the instruments featured in the 2000 convention of the Organ Historical Society.

In 2005, after more than 60 years of daily use, a complete refurbishing of the organ was begun. This work was completed in 2006.

== Gallery ==
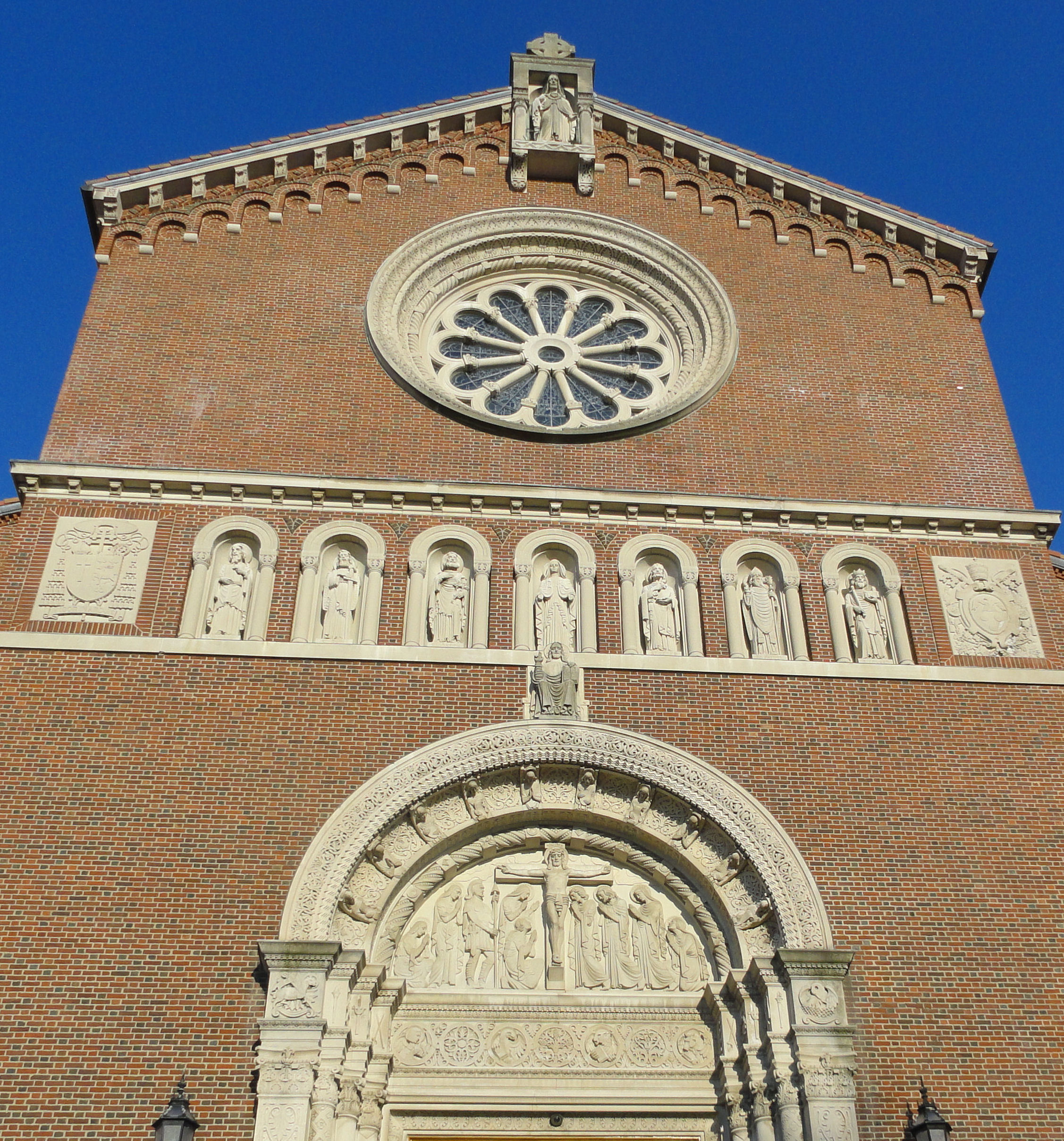
Holy Name front facade

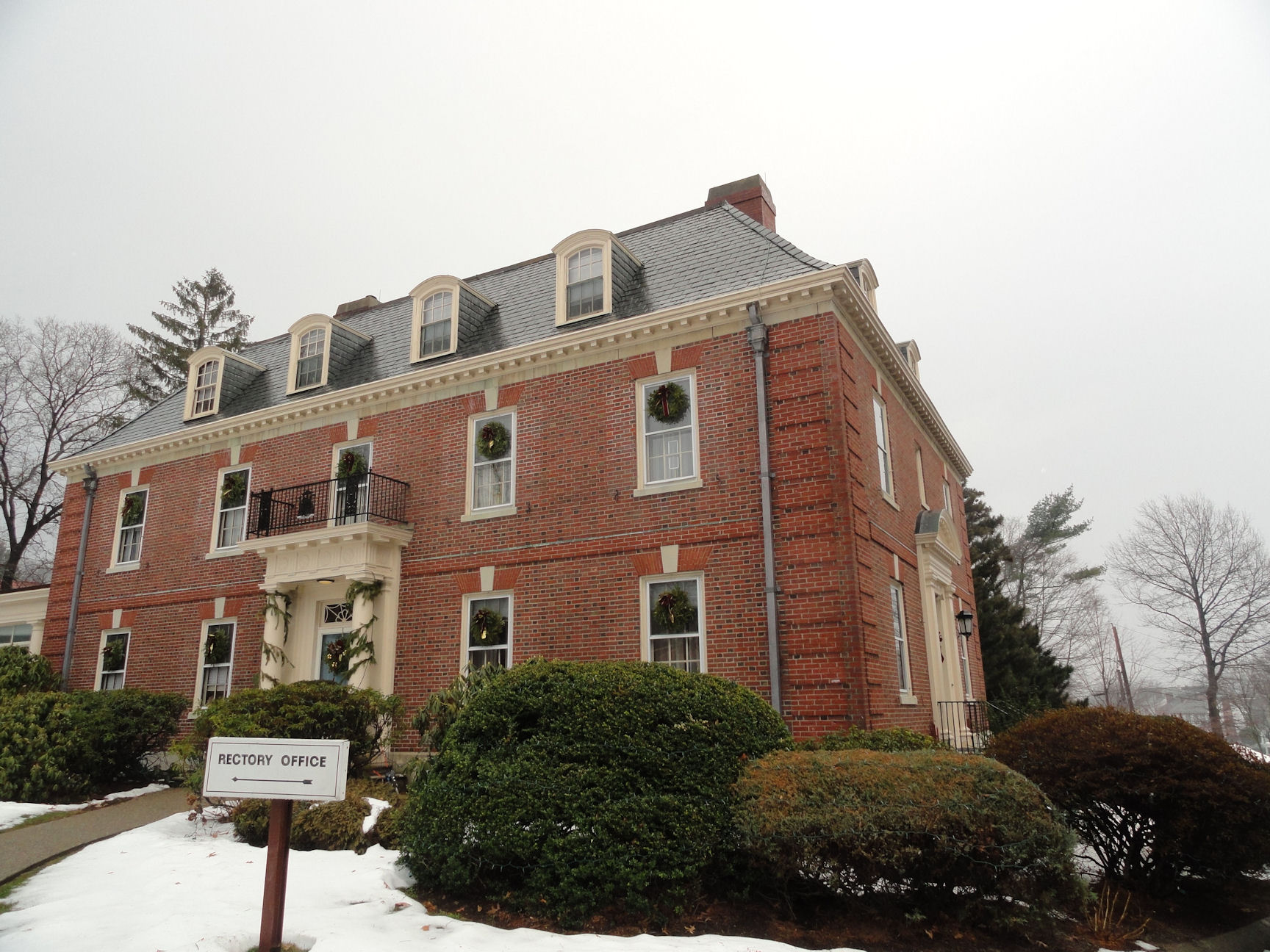
Exterior detail: Holy Name Rectory, also by Edward T. P. Graham. Directly behind the church.

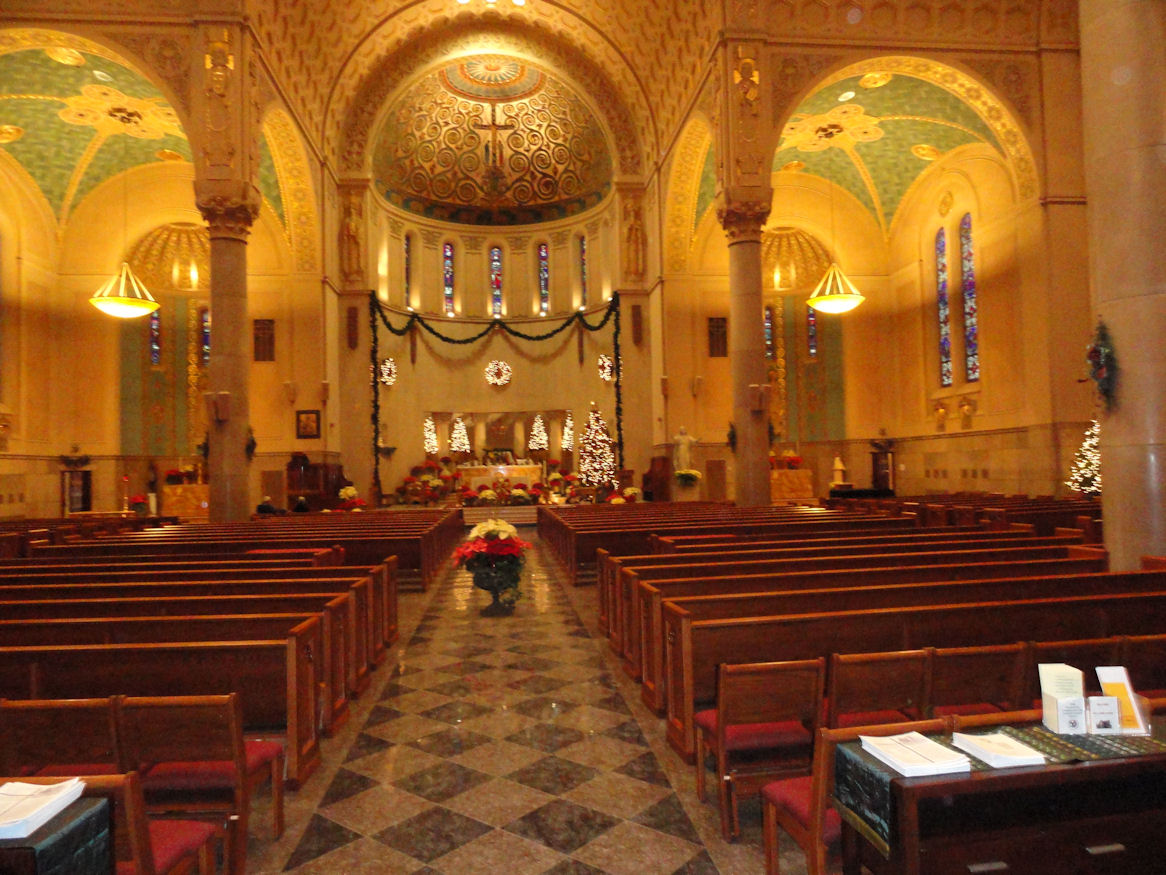
The church interior. Notice the sanctuary dome which is a copy of that of St. Clemente Bascilica Rome.

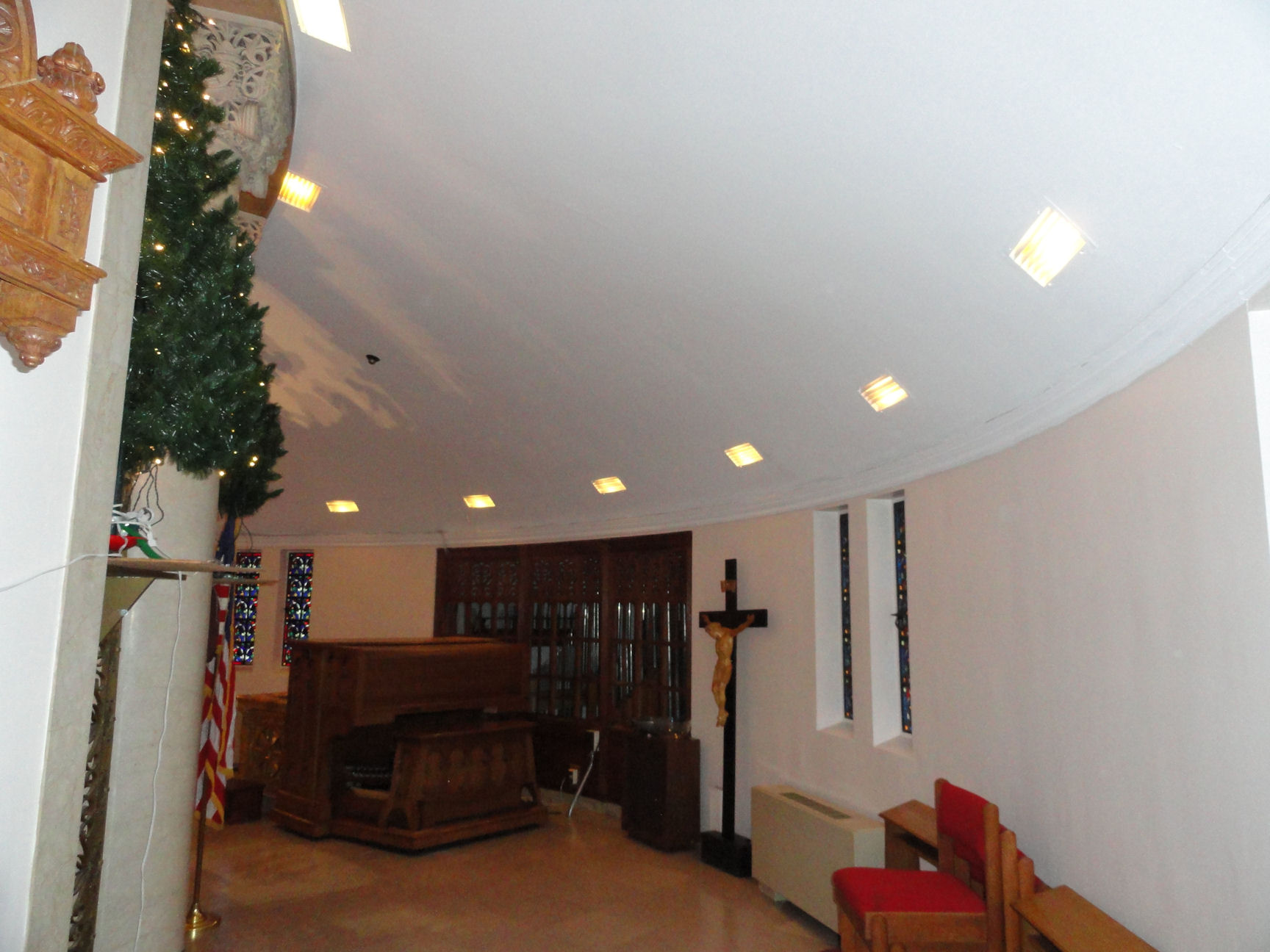
Interior detail: The second console and Sanctuary division of the Wicks organ, behind the altar.

== See also ==
- List of churches in the Roman Catholic Archdiocese of Boston
