= Mary Immaculate of Lourdes Church (Newton, Massachusetts) =

Coordinates: 42°18′44.6″N 71°13′14.8″W

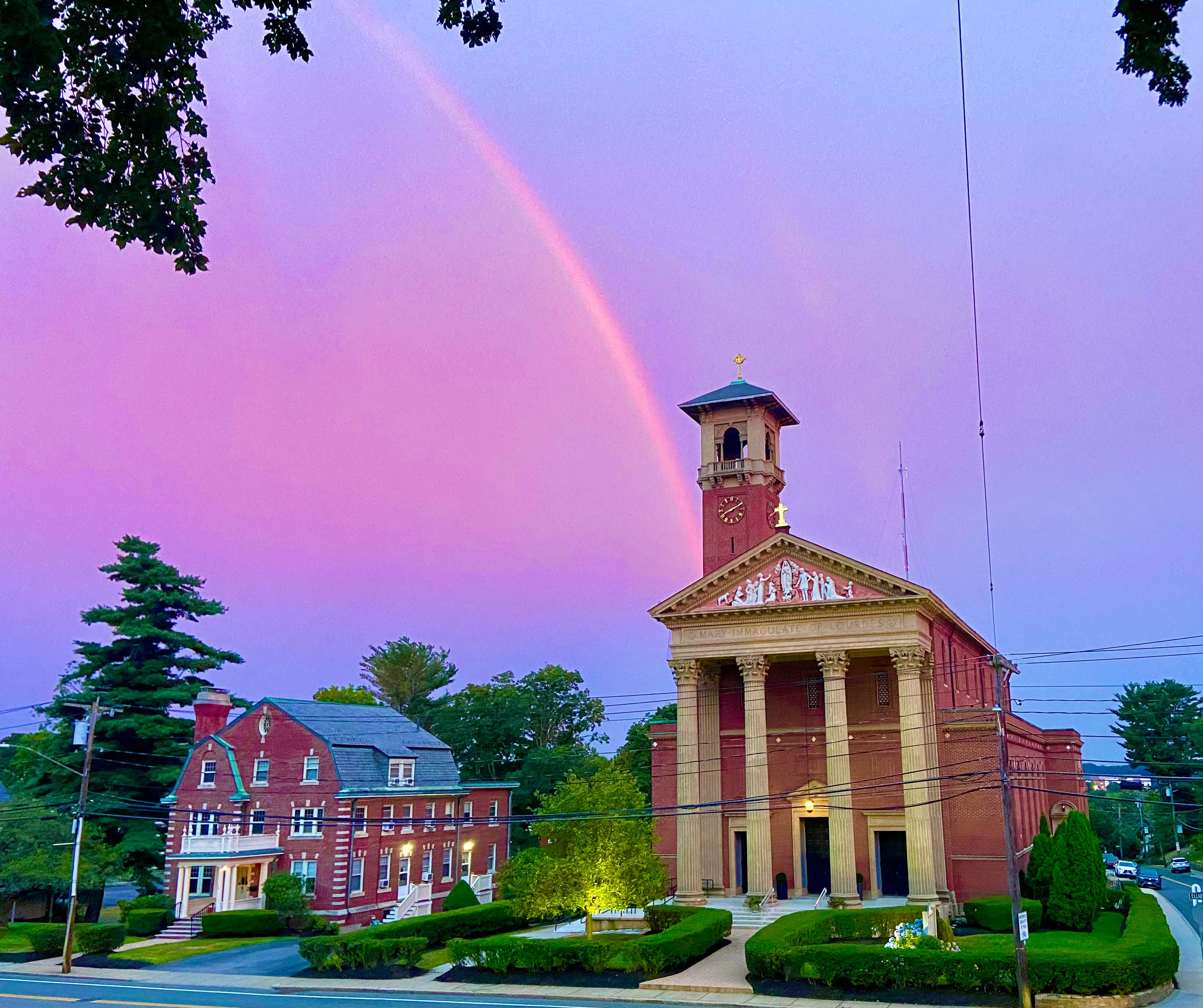
- The church in 2024
- Mary Immaculate of Lourdes Church
- Country: United States
- Denomination: Roman Catholic
- Website: maryimmaculateoflourdesnewtonma.org

History
- Former name: St. Mary's Church
- Founded: 1870
- Founder: John McCarthy
- Dedication: William Henry Cardinal O'Connell
- Dedicated: 24 November 1910

Architecture
- Architect: Edward T. P. Graham
- Architectural type: Romanesque Revival & Italianate
- Years built: 1909-1910
- Groundbreaking: 3 October 1909
- Construction cost: $150,000

Specifications
- Materials: Red brick, terra-cotta tiles

Administration
- Archdiocese: Archdiocese of Boston
- Parish: Mary Immaculate of Lourdes Parish

Clergy
- Pastor: Charles J. Higgins

Mary Immaculate of Lourdes Church, formerly referred to as St. Mary's, is a Roman Catholic parish of the Archdiocese of Boston located in Newton Upper Falls, Massachusetts. The fourteenth and current pastor is Fr. Charles Jeremiah Higgins. The parish is known locally for its rich liturgical life, and in particular as one of the few Boston parishes to offer the Tridentine Mass. The church forms part of the Newton Upper Falls Historic District, listed in the National Register of Historic Places.

== History ==
=== Early years ===
The first permanent congregation, consisting mainly of Irish factory workers, was led as time allowed by the priests of St. Mary's parish in Waltham, with greater regularity from 1844 onward. the priest Bernard Flood was appointed missionary to the Newton congregation in 1852, and around this time funds began to be collected for the purpose of constructing a church. Sunday services were infrequent until about the year 1860, when the congregation abandoned the Cahill home and began to meet in the nearby Elliot Hall in High Street. In 1867 John McCarthy succeeded Flood and immediately began to plan the construction of a church; the congregation numbered about 300 by this time.

=== St. Mary's Church ===
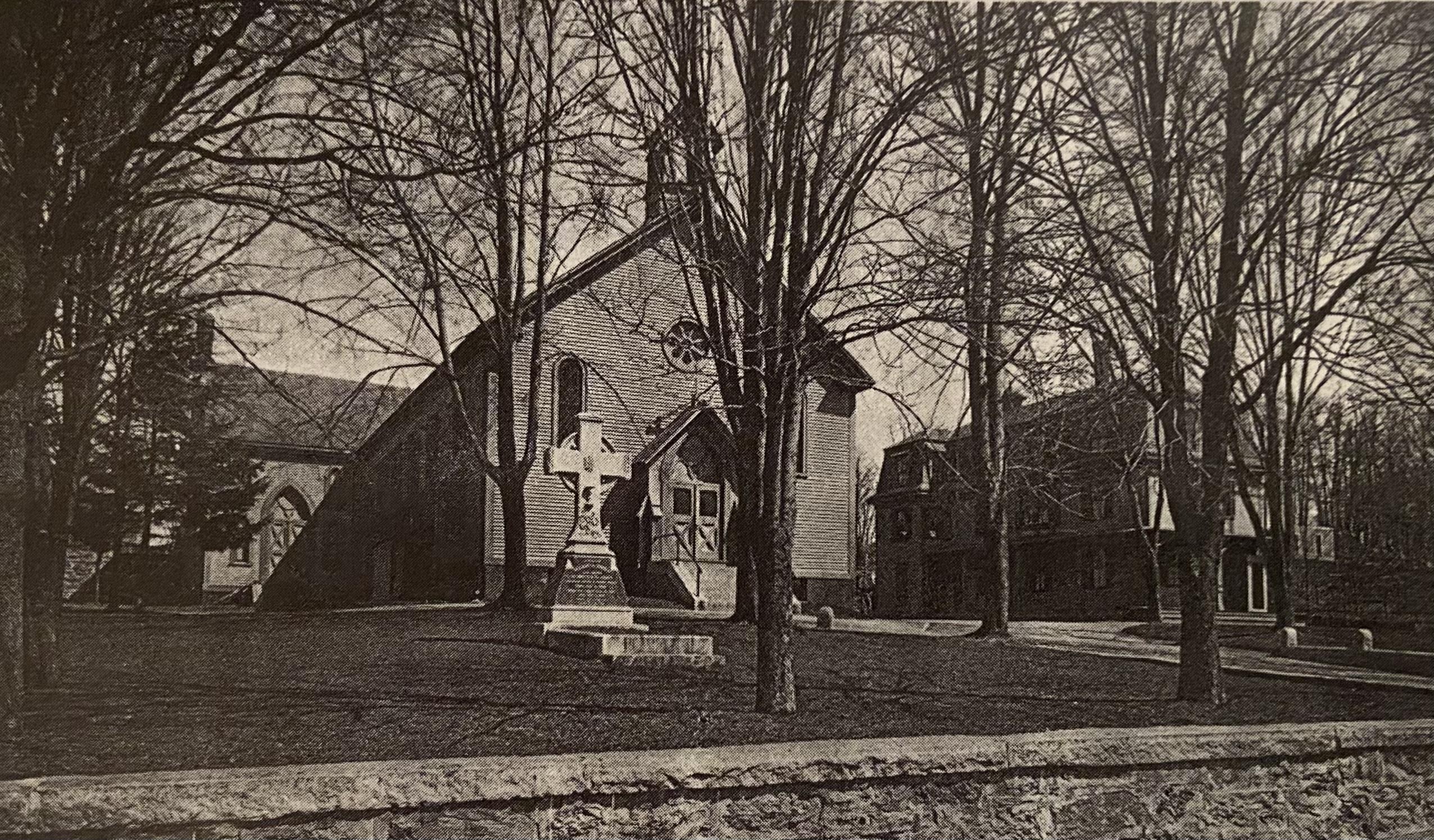
Original St. Mary's Church and rectory c.1905

By 1864 a plot of land had been purchased on the east side of Chestnut Street and soon after a wood frame gothic church called St. Mary's was built. In 1870, St. Mary's was made its own parish.

Martin O'Brien succeeded Dolan in October, 1885. O'Brien was responsible for the purchase of more adjoining land. He was pastor until his death in 1890. By the time of O'Brien's death separate parishes were established for Newton Lower Falls and Newton Centre.

=== Danahy ===
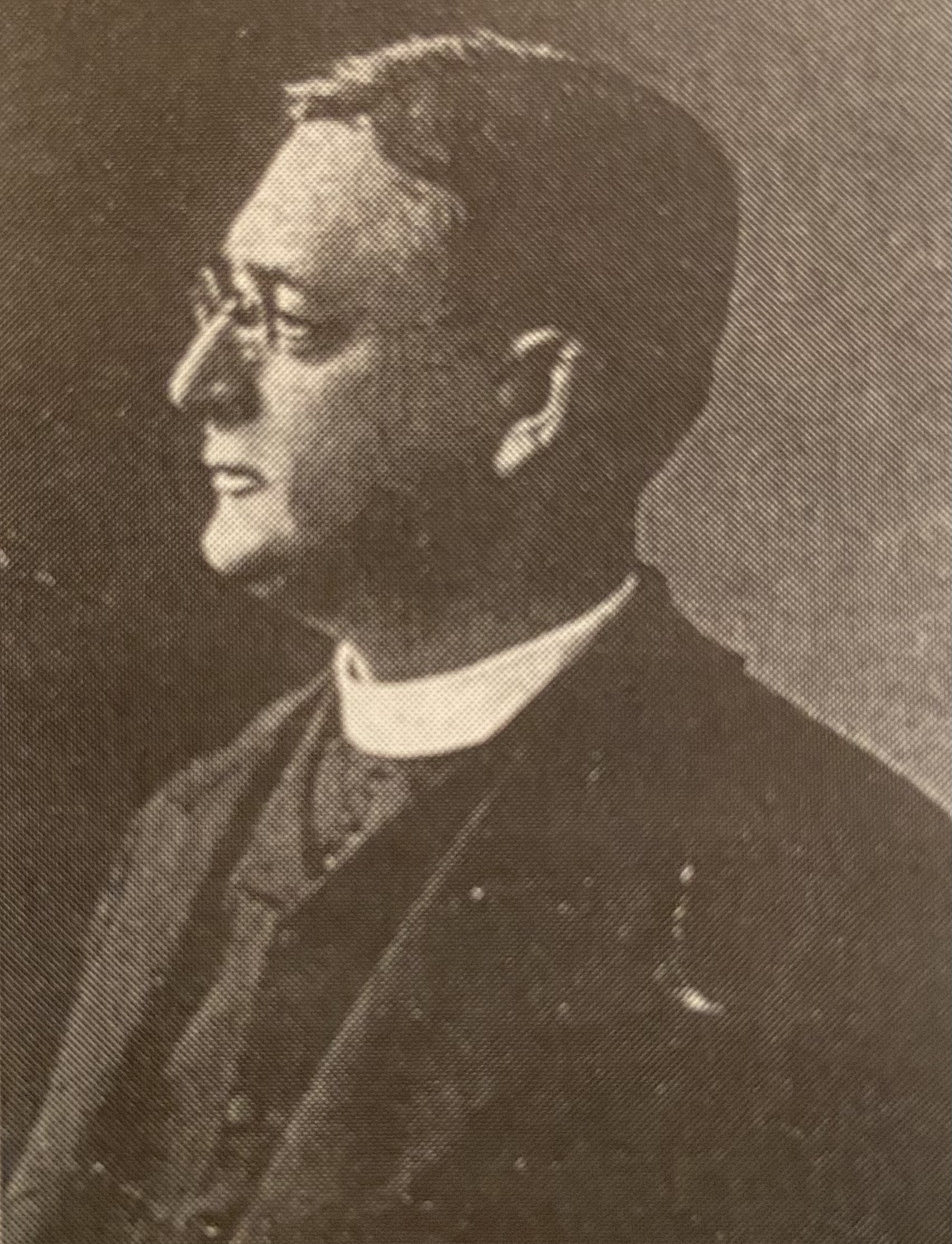
Timothy J. Danahy

Timothy J. Danahy became pastor of St. Mary's upon the death of O'Brien in November 1890. Danahy, whom an official diocesan history describes as "a pronounced example of the strong and original characters to be found among the pastors of the 'old school,'" was born on December 8, 1846 in Killarney, County Kerry, Ireland. His family emigrated to America during the years of the potato famine and settled in Roxbury, where Danahy received his early education. He studied for the priesthood at Holy Cross College and St. Joseph's Seminary and College and was ordained on December 22, 1877. Following assignments in South Boston and Quincy, he was made pastor of St. Mary's in 1890.Danahy's obituary described him as "a disciplinarian at all times, strict to himself and those around him, and at all times a student."

=== Mary Immaculate of Lourdes church ===
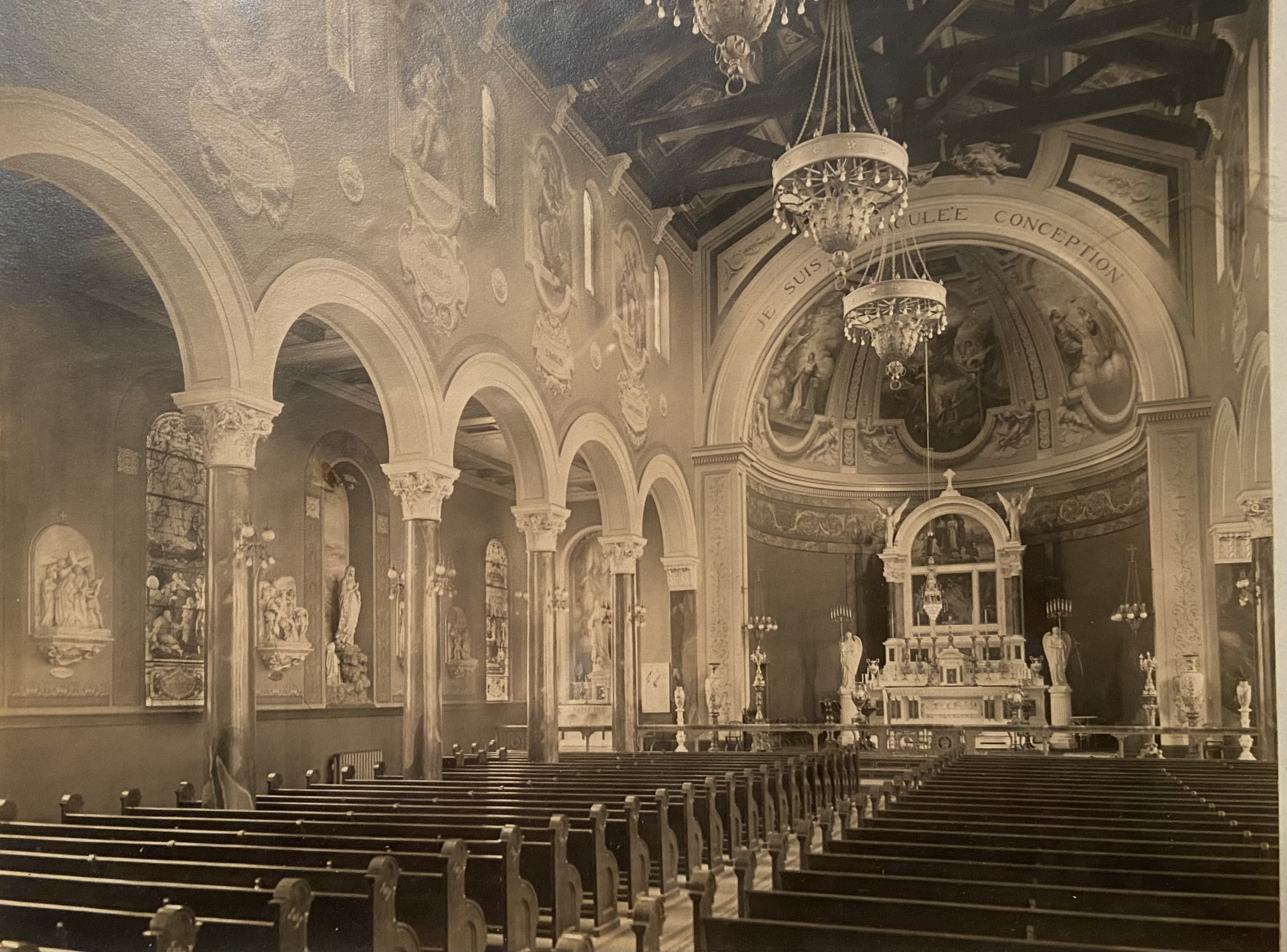
The church at the time of its dedication, 1910

Danahy oversaw the construction of a new gothic chapel for the mission of St. Joseph's in Needham, which at that time was a dependency of Saint Mary's. At the time of the construction of the new church, the congregation numbered approximately 1,500 people.

=== 21st Century ===
In 2004 the Archdiocese of Boston placed Mary Immaculate on the list of churches designated for possible closure In 2006 the archdiocese said it might keep it open and close another church instead.

== Architecture ==
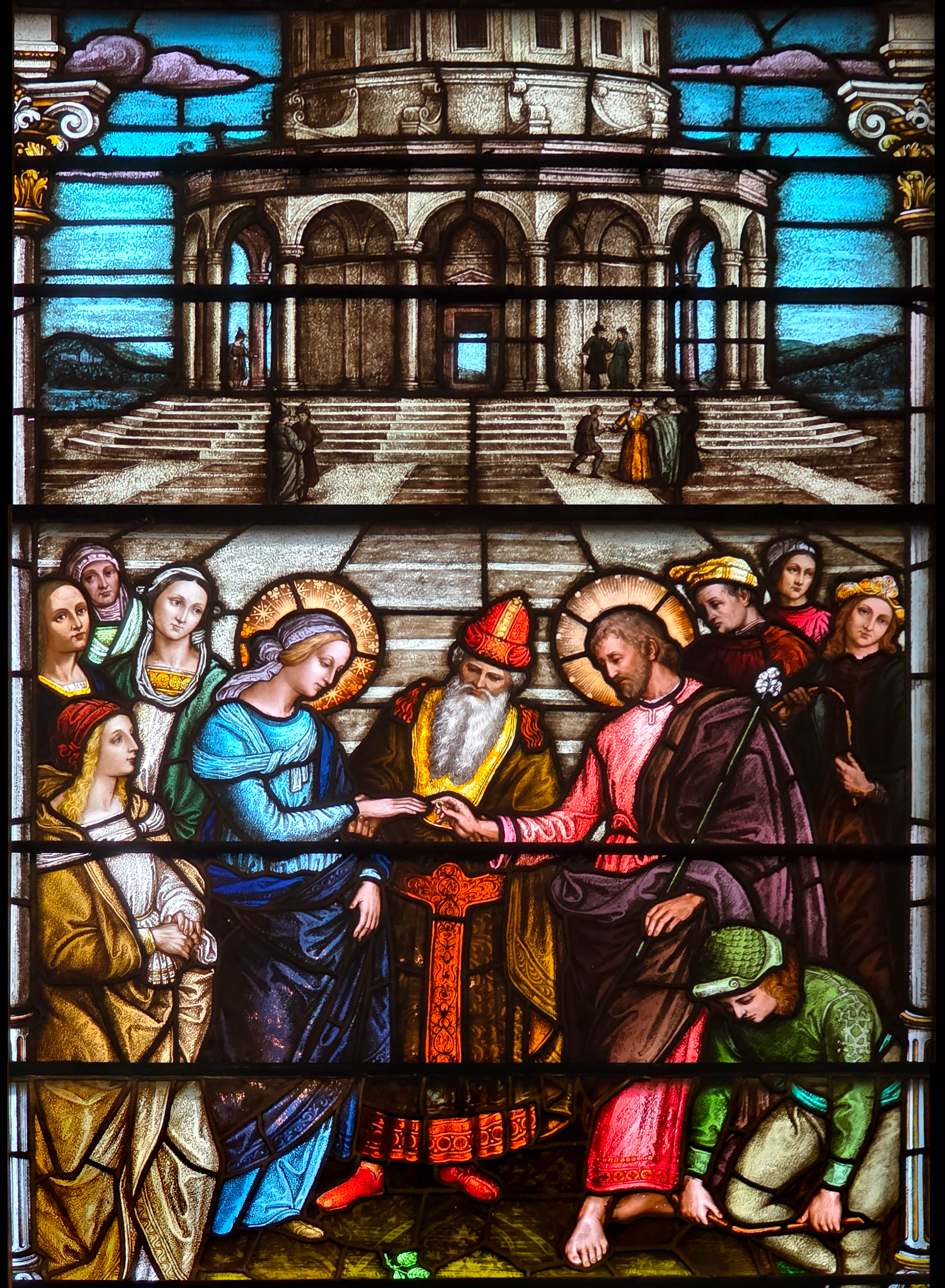
Franz Xaver Zettler Stained Glass Window after Raphael's 'The Marriage of the Virgin Mary'

The church is designed in the Romanesque style with Italianate features. The church was designed by architect Edward T. P. Graham and has frescoes by Gonippo Raggi.
