= Holy Trinity Parish (Lowell, Massachusetts) =

Coordinates: 42°38′23.2″N 71°17′56″W

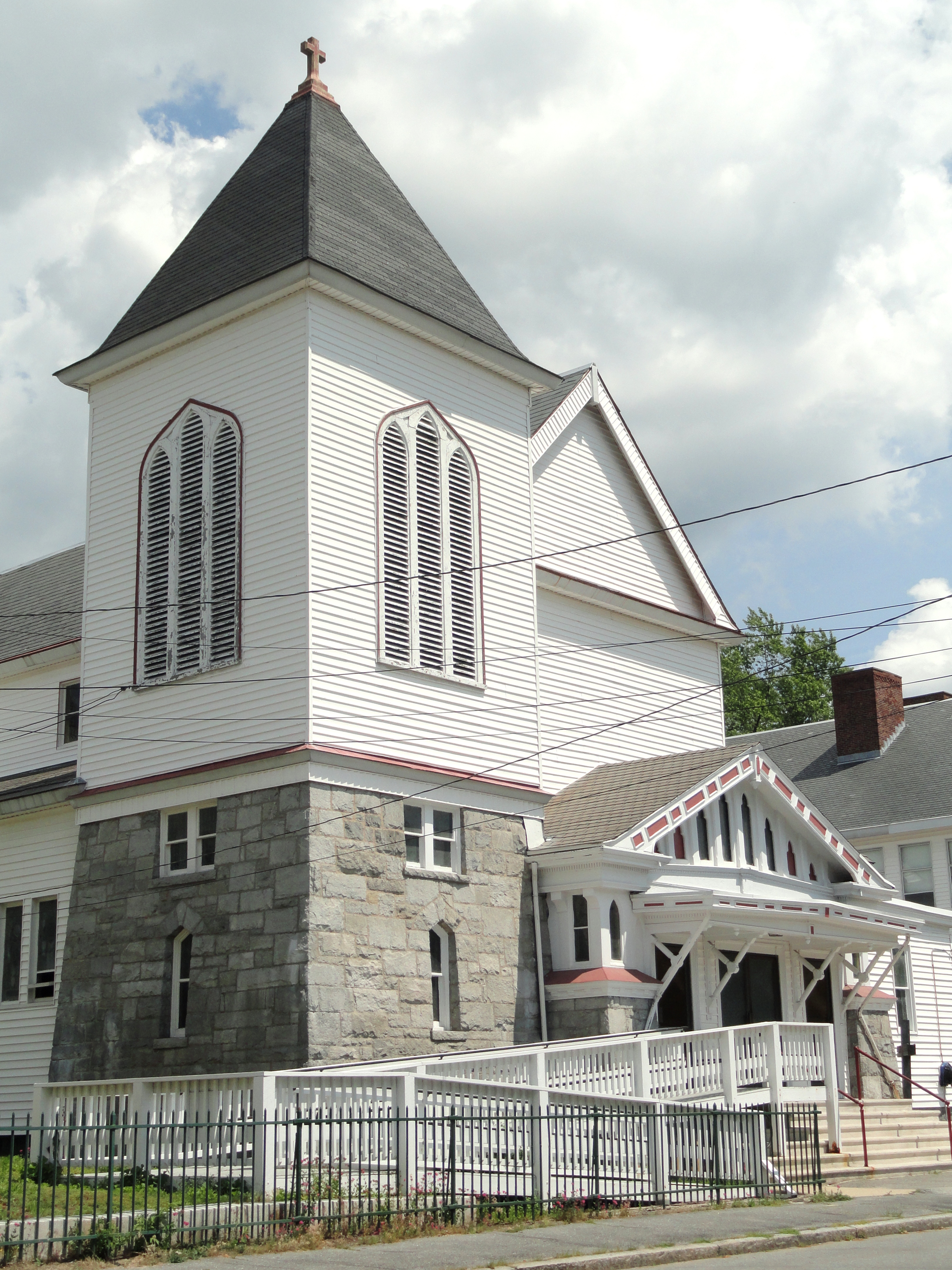
- Holy Trinity Parish
- Location: Lowell, Massachusetts
- Country: United States
- Denomination: Roman Catholic
- Website: holytrinitylowell.org

History
- Founded: 1904
- Founder: Polish immigrants
- Dedication: Holy Trinity
- Consecrated: August 19, 1904

Administration
- Division: Vicariate II
- District: Merrimack Pastoral Region
- Province: Boston
- Archdiocese: Boston

Clergy
- Archbishop: Seán Patrick O'Malley
- Bishop: Arthur M. Coyle
- Vicar: Kenneth Healey
- Pastor: Nicholas A. Sannella

Holy Trinity Parish is a Catholic Church in the Boston archdiocese designated for Polish immigrants in Lowell, Massachusetts, United States, founded in 1904.

== Bibliography ==
- Sophie Kulik; Stanley Sadowski (1993). Our Lady of Czestochowa Parish - Centennial 1893-1993. Boston, Massachusetts: Our Lady of Czestochowa Parish.
