= St. Charles Borromeo Church (Waltham, Massachusetts) =

Historic church in Massachusetts, United States

- U.S. National Register of Historic Places
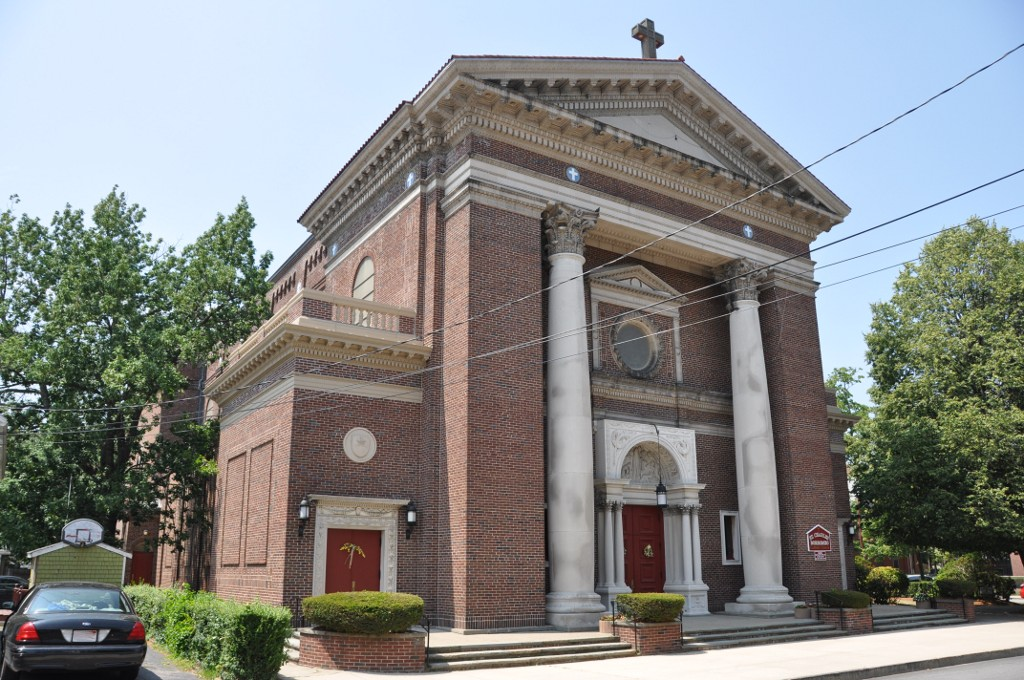

- Location within Massachusetts Location within the United States
- Location: 51 Hall St. Waltham, Massachusetts
- Coordinates: 42°22′8.3″N 71°14′8.0″W
- Built: 1915
- Architect: James F. Monaghan
- Architectural style: Renaissance
- MPS: Waltham MRA
- NRHP reference No.: 89001569
- Added to NRHP: September 28, 1989

St. Charles Borromeo Church is a former parish of the Catholic Church in Waltham, Massachusetts. It is noted for its historic church building, completed in 1922. A high quality example of Italian Renaissance Revival architecture, it is emblematic of the shift on Waltham's south side from a predominantly Protestant population to one of greater diversity. The building was listed on the National Register of Historic Places in 1989.

== Description and history ==
St. Charles Borromeo Church is located at the southwest corner of Hall and Cushing Streets, in a residential area east of Moody Street, the main commercial artery on Waltham's south side. It is a tall cruciform structure with no tower, built out of terra cotta brick with stone trim. Its front facade, oriented toward Hall Street, is dominated by two colossal Corinthian columns set in a recess on either side of the main entrance, which is flanked by clustered columns and topped by a rounded arch. A modillioned and dentillated fully pedimented gable stands above. The interior of the nave has rows of Tuscan columns, round-arch clerestory windows, and murals on the walls.

The Roman Catholic Archdiocese of Boston decided in 1909 to establish a second parish in Waltham, and services were first held in a community hall on Moody Street later that year. Construction of this building began in 1915, but was delayed by funding concerns, and was not restarted until 1922. A fire gutted the interior of the nearly finished building in 1927, after which it was refurbished. The building was designed by James F. Monaghan, a noted ecclesiastical architect.

In 2014, the parish began to be jointly administered with St. Mary's, though regular Mass continued to be celebrated at St. Charles', usually in its smaller chapel. This proved untenable during the COVID-19 pandemic, leading the archdiocese to merge the parishes and close St. Charles'. The property was sold to Waltham-based developers Hall Street Partners, who are converting the structure to condominiums set to be occupied by the end of 2024.

== See also ==
- National Register of Historic Places listings in Waltham, Massachusetts
