= St. Albert the Great Church (Weymouth, Massachusetts) =

Coordinates: 42°11′51.1″N 70°55′47.2″W

St. Albert the Great Church is a Roman Catholic parish located in Weymouth, Massachusetts. Its pastor is Father Charles J. Higgins, VF, and the parochial vicar is Father Peter J. Casey. It rose to recognition in 2004 after parishioners staged a 24-hour vigil at the church in response to announcements by the archdiocese that it would close. The parish shares its priests with nearby St. Francis Xavier Church and Masses are shared between the two parishes.

== History ==
=== Beginnings (1950-65) ===
St Albert the Great Church was founded in 1950, as a response by the Archdiocese of Boston to the city's massive population growth. The city's population more than doubled from 1940 to 1960, partially because of a new naval air station that opened in 1941, and partially because of the exodus from cities and into suburbs that began with the proliferation of the automobile. On 29 April 1951, the groundbreaking ceremony was performed. A newspaper article from that time stated that " the spiritual welfare of Weymouth is ensured for the future.," and contained a photo of the site. During the period when the building was being constructed, services were held in a bowling alley. In January 1954, Father Connors, the parish's first pastor, was given permission to perform the dedication ceremony. The parish was dedicated to St. Albert the Great, also known as Albertus Magnus, a 13th-century German Dominican friar, theologian, bishop and one of 36 official Doctors of the Church. A month later, the church was given solemn blessing and benediction. In 1953, Father Eugene P. McNamara came to St. Albert's as his first assignment as parochial vicar. He left a few years later. The parish quickly became established in the community and experienced immense growth, nearly doubling its membership from 465 to 950 from 1951 to 1962.

=== Decline and financial strains (1966-02) ===
In the late 1960s, the parish began experiencing demographic decline, financial struggles, and political strain. The parish correspondence files in the archdiocesan archives reveal conflicts about the implementation of Vatican II reforms at the parish during 1970 and 1971. One of the parochial reforms urges pastors to increase lay participation in the management of parish finances. Parishes now created lay 'parish boards' or 'councils' which were supposed to meet with pastors regularly. After only one year in existence, the St. Albert the Great parish board wrote a letter to the archdiocesan Moderator of Councils requesting that he use his influence to encourage the church's pastor to involve himself more in board activities. Although the pastor was the Council Board Chairman, the letters, signed by eight lay board members and two priests denoted as spiritual directors, indicate that the priest stopped showing up after the first board meeting, and was avoiding and ignoring all the board members. The letters indicate this is not merely an issue of communication, stating:

"The majority of parishioners in St. Albert's parish share the knowledge that the parish is in a state of decline. They are discouraged and disillusioned and are confused as to where they should turn now. The only chance for survival for the future of this parish is throughout cooperation with the pastor. We need the guidance and direction of the Pastor as recommended by the writings of Vatican II."

During the years that followed, a new pastor brought greater openness, but with this new transparency the board and parishioners discovered just how drastic the financial situation was. With budget shortfalls and outstanding debts to the archdiocese, the parish engaged in a number of fundraising drives. By 1976, a parish team was going house-to-house distributing new envelopes and a parish census as part of the pastor's new "increased income appeal." The pastor's written explanation on these forms emphasized the need for donations to keep St. Albert's financially stable, saying:

"Please remember this Appeal represents a SOUND INVESTMENT in our wonderful parish with its excellent programs and fine facilities that will reflect the love and generosity of ALL parishioners. It will guarantee a renewed and fiscally-sound St. Albert's parish. The parish is counting on YOU!"

These fundraising efforts provided some short-term relief, but within a short while, the parish was in hot water yet again. It became clear to the board that with weekly collections as their only source of revenue, the parish could "scarcely keep even." By the mid-1970s, the parish was relying on social activities and gaming like Beano in the parish hall to keep its finances afloat. By 1980, parish leadership warned churchgoers not to let the few dedicated Beano volunteers become overworked, because the profits from hosting the game had "paid for all our major improvements and supported the various programs of the church." The situation at St. Albert's had become so drastic that by the late 90s, under the leadership of Father Lawrence J. Borges, 'giving' had been integrated into the parish identity. The title of a 1999 parish bulletin read: "St. Albert the Great: A Stewardship Parish." The weekly bulletins during this time regularly featured a "Stewardship Corner," where exceptional acts of giving or requests for donations were recorded. In 2001, the pastor, Father John J. Nichols, and the finance committee released a quarterly financial report containing the following message:

"Father Nichols and your parish Finance Committee want to thank you for your generous response for increased offertory contributions. We are not surprised as you have always responded when we asked. Asking for money is always difficult and really should not be necessary. We all have a personal obligation to support the church as would be appropriate given our individual circumstances, as Disciples of Christ. Just as there is a price to pay to live as free Americans, there too is a cost to worship where and how we chose [sic]."

=== New leadership and stability (2002-04) ===
The desperate and accusatory tone in this report probably related to money the church had recently borrowed from the archdiocese to make parish improvements. In 2002, as the child sex-abuse scandals began to shake the American Catholic Church, Father Nichols retired (for reasons unrelated to the abuse scandals) and was replaced by Father Ronald Coyne, a popular but controversial priest, who preached a gospel of love and supported a more democratic Church. Known for rejecting Church dogma on the existence of hell, Father Coyne brought to the parish a renewed sense of ownership and community. He inspired the parish community by installing new stained-glass windows, and was known to remind mass attendees, "You are gifted and you are the church." An older parishioner from St. Albert's once described the new atmosphere at the church to a reporter from the magazine Boston:

“We had a priest once who spent money to install new glass doors. He pointed at them during a sermon and said, 'I had those doors installed so I'll know who arrives for Mass late and who leaves early.'"

The parishioner told him that was when he decided this was no longer the church for him. When the reporter asked what brought him back, he responded, “Father Ron." According to the magazine Boston, another parishioner, Weymouth resident Eileen Rowan, called Father Coyne “the most human side of the Catholic Church one could ever meet.” While his charismatic nature made him popular with parishioners, the financial burdens of the parish were still significant. Father Coyne acknowledged the sexual abuse cases while still requesting financial support from parishioners in this written message:

"This is not an easy time to contribute to the Church, but your generosity assures me that you trust the leadership of our parish. Your investment financially and spiritually guarantees a healthy future."

The main financial stress on the parish at that time was a $150,000 debt to the archdiocese, most of it from a recent loan that was used for church and rectory renovations. With both revived parish morale and increasing numbers of parishioners, the debt was paid off in two years.

By 2002, in the midst of scandals, mass attendance around the archdiocese declines from around 17.5% in 2001 to a little less than 15% the following year. The Catholic Appeal, one of the archdiocese's main fundraising tools, took a harder hit, going from $17 million raised in 2001 to $8 million the year later. The archdiocesan budget deficits that came with this caused Bernard Cardinal Law, Boston's archbishop, to consider parish and school closings. On 13 December 2002, Cardinal Law resigned from office and left Boston for Rome shortly after, allegedly hours before state troopers with subpoenas arrived to seek jury testimony. On July 1, 2003, Seán O'Malley was appointed the new archbishop.

=== Closure announcement and occupation (2004-05) ===
In late 2003, Archbishop O'Malley requested that parish leaders meet in their clusters, or regional parish groupings, to discuss whether one or two parishes should close if he decided that region had too many for the local Catholic population to support. O'Malley cited reasons including urban decline, priest shortages, declining mass attendance, and a decline in archdiocesan revenue as result of the sex-abuse scandals. The process consisted of each parish choosing another parish (or itself) from its cluster to recumbent for closure. Some participants and dubious observers have compared the method to the television series Survivor, in which contestants form cliques and use strength to win challenges and vote other members off the island. The process was semi-successful. In some clusters, a consensus was reached about which parish should close. In others, suspicions about hierarchal influences and inflated church attendance statistics arose. When the cluster meetings ended, around 100 parishes for the archbishop to evaluate for closure. The Presbyteral Council, a group of priests chosen to assist the archbishop with running the archdiocese, came up with an additional 24 parishes that had refused to make a recommendation, and 13 more after reviewing individual circumstances, making a total of roughly 137 parishes up for closure by May 2004. On May 15, 65 closure announcements were sent out, and more followed a few days later. St. Albert's received a closure announcement.

By August 2004, multiple parishes had begun to protest the announcements, refusing to close. Father Coyne received a standing ovation after his final mass at the church on September 1. Boston Globe reporter Bella English reported at the time:

"Kleenex boxes dotted every pew. Worshipers lined the outer aisles, stood in the back, crowded into the foyer and spilled onto the front steps."

During that last Mass, a member of the parish board read a statement expressing gratitude to Father Coyne, saying:

“We will no longer blindly follow the mandates set down by the institution. We now understand that we are the church and we are followers of Christ and not the Archdiocese of Boston.”

After mass, a group of parishioners announced a 'perpetual vigil,' and retreated into the basement to begin their occupation. Shifts were assigned, but food and water were stored in case safe access to the building was blocked. Occupiers entertained themselves with knitting, coffee, and camaraderie. Media flocked to the church to report on the occupiers. Parishioners filed a civil lawsuit against the Archdiocese of Boston arguing that the archdiocese did not own the church, but acted as its trustee. Daily prayer services and rosaries were held. Later, priestless communion services were held, which is officially considered blasphemy within the Catholic Church. The occupiers were receiving consecrated hosts from sympathetic but anonymous nearby priests. The parishioners protested the closure and argued it was unjustified, citing their secure finances, high mass attendance, dynamic adult and children's groups, and donations to charity. Archdiocese of Boston spokesman Father Christopher Coyne told the New York Times in September 2004 that St. Albert the Great would not be allowed open, and that it would be more difficult for the archdiocese to allow it now, because it would imply that the way to reverse a closure decision is "to sue the archdiocese and occupy the church," and implied that other factors came into play, such as St. Albert's lack of a school. He then stated:

"We're downsizing because we just can't continue to maintain the number of churches in the entire archdiocese. We just don't need five churches in Weymouth. They are the smallest church. We're doing this all across the archdiocese and they are not alone."

As of October 2004, 29 parishes were officially closed. Fifty-nine parishes had closed by May 2005. St Albert the Great and dozens of others remained occupied, engulfed in civil lawsuits, or awaiting appeal decisions from the Vatican. By June 2005, 15 appeals had been sent to the Vatican by parishes, nine churches were being occupied, and several more were bringing civil lawsuits to the archdiocese. The Council of Parishes was formed to represent the interests of occupied parishes and those resisting closure, made up of parishioners from 16 parishes on the original closure list.

=== Closure decision reversal to present (2005-present) ===
On 13 June 2005, the Archdiocese of Boston officially revoked the decision to close St. Albert the Great Church. Father Mark O'Connell, assistant for canonical affairs stated:

“[Archbishop Séan O'Malley] spent a couple of months trying to bring this out the best way possible. On June 13, he completed that canonical process.”

The archbishop announced, "the parish remains open as a full parish." He appointed Father Laurence J. Borges as pastor. Father Borges was the pastor at St. Albert's from 1994 to 1999, and at the time was stationed at St. Stephen Parish in Framingham. He retired in 2009, and left St. Albert the Great for St. Gregory's in Dorchester, where he was assigned the parochial vicar.

In September 2015, St. Albert parishioners gathered in Weymouth Elks Lodge to celebrate the 10th anniversary of their vigil, which lasted 10 months in total and led to eight other parishes holding their own.
