= St. Mary's Roman Catholic Church Complex (Waltham, Massachusetts) =

Historic church in Massachusetts, United States

- U.S. National Register of Historic Places
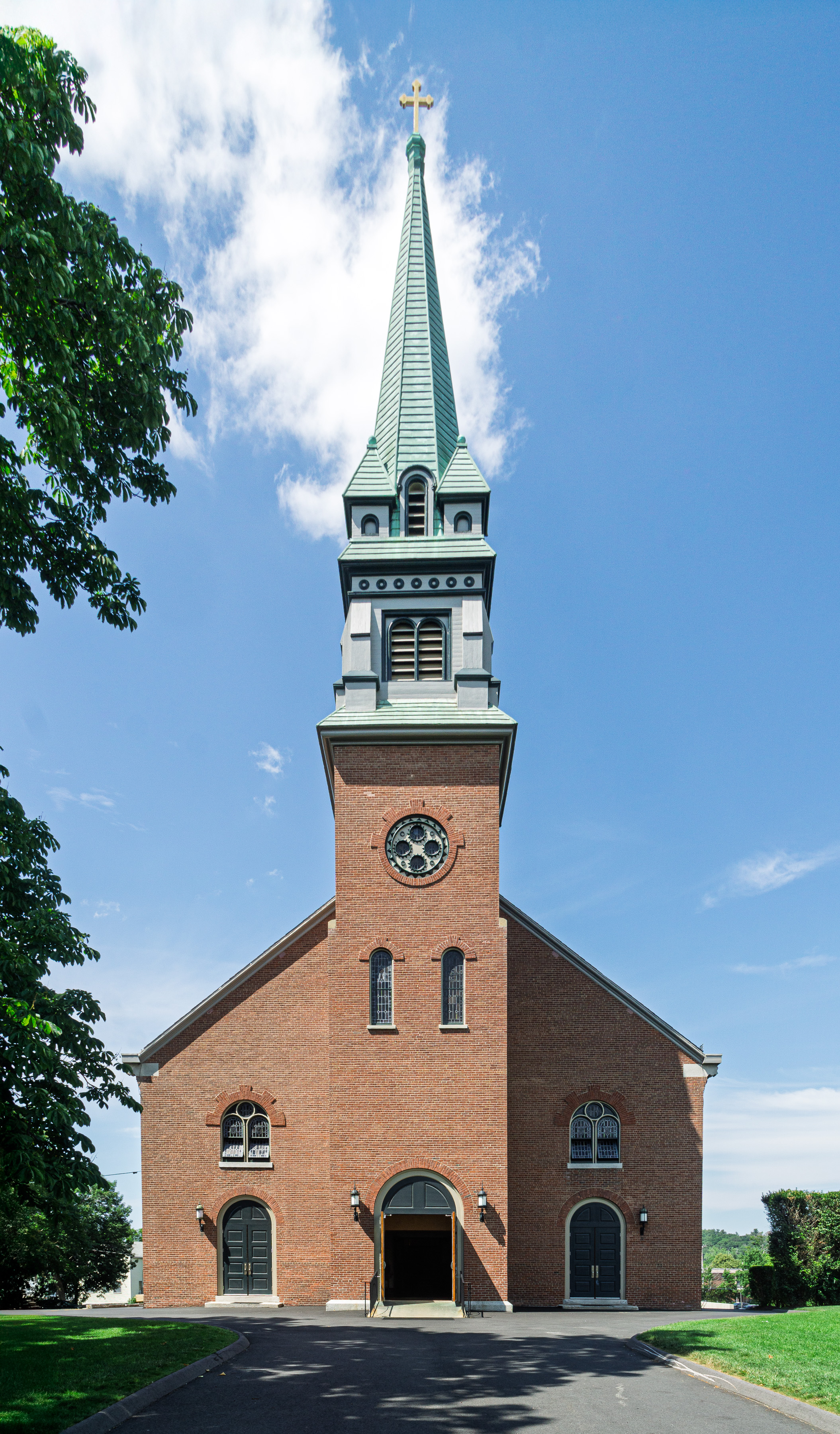
- 2025

- Location within Massachusetts Location within the United States
- Location: 133 School Street, Waltham, Massachusetts
- Coordinates: 42°22′44″N 71°14′14″W
- Area: 4.8 acres (1.9 ha)
- Built: 1858
- Architect: Cowen & Hanrahan; Et al.
- Architectural style: Colonial Revival, Second Empire, Romanesque
- MPS: Waltham MRA
- NRHP reference No.: 89001527
- Added to NRHP: September 28, 1989

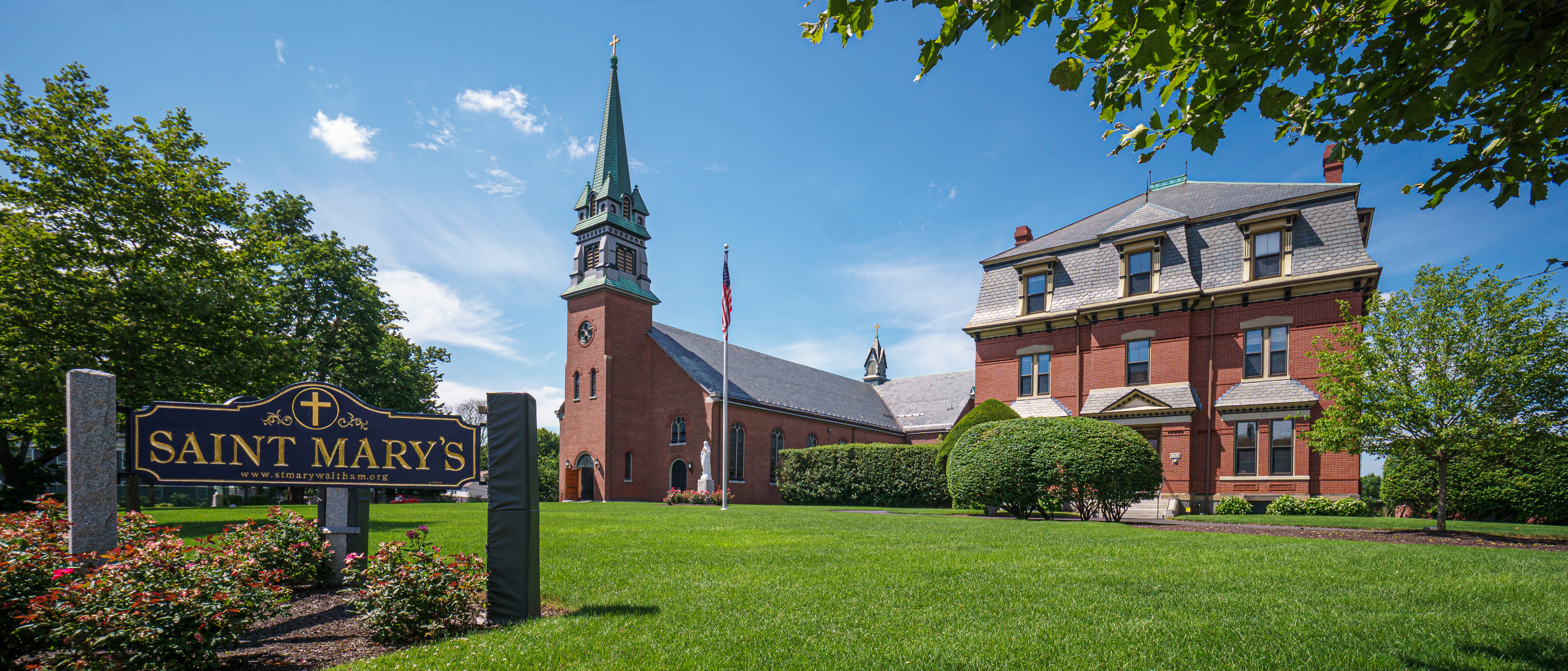
Church and rectory

St. Mary's Roman Catholic Church Complex is a historic multi-building church complex at 133 School Street in Waltham, Massachusetts. Established as a parish in 1835, it is the city's oldest Roman Catholic establishment. Its 1858 Romanesque Revival church and 1872 Second Empire rectory are particularly fine architectural examples of their styles. The complex was listed on the National Register of Historic Places in 1989.

== Description and history ==
St. Mary's is located on School Street west of Lexington Street, one block north of Waltham's Central Square, and its property extends around the district court just to its east, and north to Pond Street. The oldest building in the complex is the Romanesque Revival brick church, whose construction began in 1858 and was not completed until 1872. Work to enlarge the church began soon thereafter, in 1875. The rectory, built in 1882–83, is one of Waltham's finest Second Empire buildings, and includes a period carriage house. A parochial school built later in the 1880s was demolished in the 1970s. The Classical Revival high school was built in the 1920s, and a Georgian Revival education center was built behind the church in the 1930s.

The parish was established in 1835 to minister to the city's growing Irish Catholic population, and its first church was built soon afterward. That wood-frame structure was destroyed by fire in 1846, forcing a relocation of the parish to Watertown. It returned to Waltham with the construction of the present church.

== See also ==
- National Register of Historic Places listings in Waltham, Massachusetts
