= Our Lady of Czestochowa Parish =

Our Lady of Czestochowa Parish may refer to:

- Our Lady of Czestochowa Parish, Boston, Massachusetts
- Our Lady of Czestochowa Parish, Coventry, Rhode Island
- Our Lady of Czestochowa Parish, Turners Falls, Massachusetts
- Our Lady of Czestochowa Parish, Worcester, Massachusetts

== See also ==
- Our Lady of Częstochowa-St Casimir Parish, New York City
- Our Lady of Częstochowa Church, Orzechowo, Poland
