= List of churches in the Diocese of Providence =

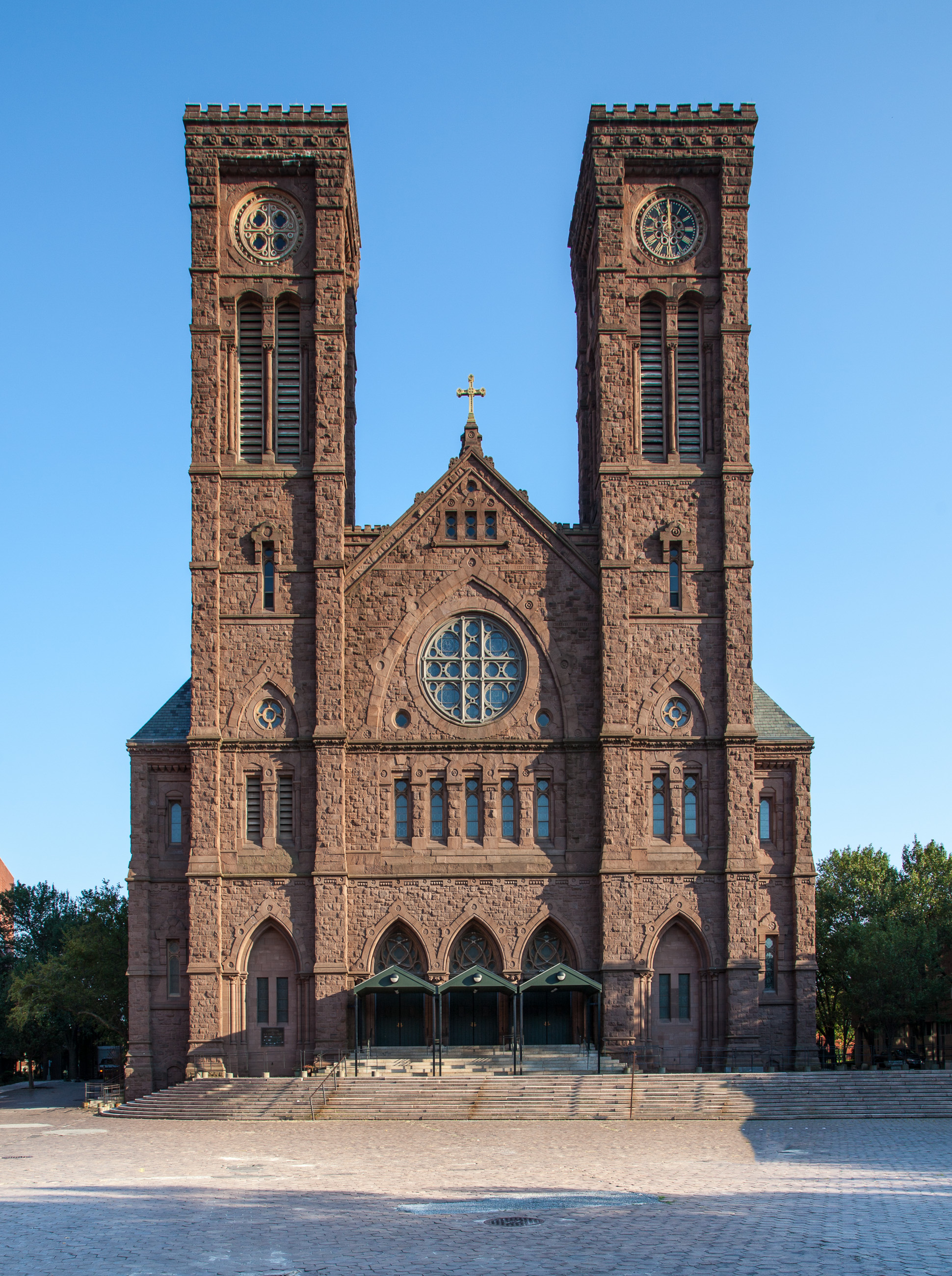
Cathedral of SS Peter and Paul

This is a list of current and former Roman Catholic churches in the Roman Catholic Diocese of Providence in the State of Rhode Island in the United States. The diocese covers all five counties in Rhode Island.

The cathedral church of the archdiocese is the Cathedral of Saints Peter and Paul, built from 1878 to 1889 in Providence.

== Providence County ==
=== Providence ===
Name	Image	Location	Description/notes
Assumption of the Blessed Virgin Mary		791 Potters Ave, Providence	Founded in 1871, current church dedicated in 1912
		St. Anthony Mission Church, 549 Plainfield St, Providence	Supervised by Assumption of the BVM Parish
Blessed Sacrament		239 Regent Ave, Providence	Parish founded in 1888; current church dedicated in 1904
Cathedral of SS. Peter and Paul		30 Fenner St, Providence	Built 1878–1889; listed in NRHP
Holy Ghost		472 Atwells Ave, Providence	Parish founded in 1889 for Italian immigrants. Current church dedicated in 1910
Holy Name of Jesus		107 Camp St, Providence	Parish founded in 1882, current church dedicated in church in 1900
Our Lady of Lourdes		901 Atwells Ave, Providence	Current church dedicated in 1925; listed on NRHP.
Our Lady of the Rosary		21 Traverse St, Providence	Current church dedicated in 1906 for Portuguese immigrants
St. Adalbert		866 Atwells Ave, Providence	Founded in 1902 for Polish immigrants; current church dedicated in 1926
St. Agnes		100 Chatham St, Providence	
St. Anne		2 Russo St, Providence	
St. Augustine		20 Old Rd, Providence	Founded in 1929
St. Bartholomew		297 Laurel Hill Ave, Providence	
St. Charles		178 Dexter St, Providence	
St. Edward		997 Branch Ave, Providence	Merged into St. Anthony Parish in North Providence in 2022
St. Joseph		92 Hope St, Providence	Gothic church built 1851; listed on NRHP
St. Mary's on Broadway		538 Broadway, Providence	Current church dedicated in 1869
St. Michael		239 Oxford St, Providence	Parish founded 1857; Anglo-Norman Gothic style church built 1915; listed on NRHP
St. Patrick		244 Smith St, Providence	
St. Pius V		55 Elmhurst Ave, Providence	Founded in 1918 to serve the Providence College community.
St. Raymond		1240 N Main St, Providence	Founded in 1911
St. Sebastian		67 Cole Ave, Providence	Parish founded in 1915, church started construction that same year.
St. Thomas		65 Fruit Hill Ave, Providence	
		Holy Cross Church, 118 King Philip St, Providence	Became a mission church of St. Thomas Parish in 2018

=== Burrillville ===
Name	Image	Location	Description/notes
Burrillville Catholic Collaborative		Our Lady of Good Help Church, 1063 Victory Hwy, Mapleville	Now part of Burrillville Catholic Collaborative
		St. Theresa of the Child Jesus Shrine, 35 Dion Dr, Burrillville	Became mission of Our Lady of Good Help in 2019. Now part of Burrillville Catholic Collaborative
St. Patrick		45 Harrisville Main St, Harrisville	Founded in 1854, current church dedicated in 1938. Now part of Burrillville Catholic Collaborative

=== Central Falls ===
Name	Image	Location	Description/notes
Holy Spirit Parish		St. Matthew Church, 1030 Dexter St, Central Falls	Founded as St. Matthew in 1906 for French-Canadian immigrants, church dedicated in 1929. Now part of Holy Spirit Parish
St. Joseph		391 High St, Central Falls	Founded in 1905 for Polish immigrants, Church built in 1915

=== Cranston ===
Name	Image	Location	Description/notes
Holy Apostles		800 Pippin Orchard Rd, Cranston	Founded in 1991, current church dedicated in 1994
Immaculate Conception		237 Garden Hills Dr, Cranston	Current church dedicated in 1968
St. Mark		9 Garden Ct, Cranston	Founded in 1950, current church dedicated in 1952
St. Mary		1525 Cranston St, Cranston	Founded in 1925 for Italian immigrants, current church dedicated in the 1920s
St. Matthew		1299 Elmwood Ave, Cranston	Founded in 1909
St. Paul		30 Warwick Ave, Cranston	Founded in 1907, current church dedicated in 1933

=== Cumberland ===
Name	Image	Location	Description/notes
Our Lady of Fatima		1 Fatima Dr, Cumberland	Founded for Portuguese immigrants, the current church was dedicated in 1965.
St. Aidan-St. Patrick Parish		1460 Diamond Hill Rd, Cumberland	St. Aidan and St. Patrick Parishes merged in 2018
St. Joan of Arc		3357 Mendon Rd, Cumberland	Founded in 1929, church dedicated in 1963
St. John Vianney		3587 Diamond Hill Rd, Cumberland	
St. Joseph		1303 Mendon Rd, Cumberland	Founded as a mission and church dedicated in 1899; listed on NRHP

=== East Providence ===
Name	Image	Location	Description/notes
Our Lady of Loreto		346 Waterman Ave, East Providence	Founded in 1920 to serve Italian immigrants, current church dedicated in 1968
Sacred Heart		118 Taunton Ave, East Providence	
St. Brendan		60 Turner Ave, Riverside	Founded as a mission in 1893, became a parish in 1909. Current was church dedicated in 1969
St. Francis Xavier		81 N. Carpenter St, East Providence	Founded in 1914 for Portuguese immigrants. Current church dedicated in 1916
St. Margaret		1098 Pawtucket Ave, Rumford	Founded as a mission in 1887, became a parish in 1888
St. Martha		2595 Pawtucket Ave, East Providence	Founded in 1956

=== Johnston ===
Name	Image	Location	Description/notes
Our Lady of Grace		4 Lafayette St #2712, Johnston	Founded in 1913 as a mission for Italian immigrants
St. Robert Bellarmine		1804 Atwood Ave, Johnston	Founded in 1963, current church dedicated in 1966
St. Rocco		927 Atwood Ave, Johnston	Parish founded in 1903 for Italian immigrants, church dedicated in 1951

=== Lincoln area ===
Name	Image	Location	Description/notes
St. Ambrose		191 School St, Albion	Founded in 1892
St. Jude		301 Front St, Lincoln	Current church dedicated in 1967
St. James		33 Division St, Manville, Lincoln	Founded in 1875, current church dedicated in 1932

=== North Providence ===
Name	Image	Location	Description/notes
Mary, Mother of Mankind		25 4th St, North Providence	Founded as a chapel in 1954, was upgraded to a mission and then a parish in 1967. Current church dedicated in 1980
St. Anthony		1413 Mineral Spring Ave, North Providence	Founded as a mission in 1931, became a parish in 1944. Current church dedicated in 1969
		Church of the Presentation of the Blessed Virgin Mary, 1081 Mineral Spring Ave, North Providence	Founded in 1913. Merged into St. Anthony Parish in 2022

=== Pawtucket ===
Name	Image	Location	Description/notes
Holy Family Parish		Our Lady of Consolation Church, 10 Charles St, Pawtucket	Church constructed in the 1920s. Became part of Holy Family Parish in 2009
		Sacred Heart of Jesus Church, 38 Park St, Pawtucket	Became part of Holy Family Parish in 2009
		St. Joseph Church, 195 Walcott St, Pawtucket	Founded in 1874, church dedicated in 1878. Became part of Holy Family Parish in 2009
St. Anthony		32 Lawn Ave, Pawtucket	Founded in 1926 for Portuguese immigrants
St. John the Baptist		68 Slater St, Pawtucket	Founded in 1886 for French-Canadian immigrants. Current church dedicated in 1927; listed on NRHP
St. John Paul		St. Cecelia Church, 745 Central Ave, Pawtucket	Became part of St. John Paul II Parish in 2011
St. Mary of the Immaculate Conception		103 Pine St, Pawtucket	Founded in 1853, church dedicated in 1887; listed on NRHP
St. Teresa of the Child Jesus		358 Newport Ave, Pawtucket	

=== Smithfield area ===
Name	Image	Location	Description/notes
St. John the Evangelist		63 Church St, Slatersville,	Founded in 1872
St. Michael		80 Farnum Pike, Smithfield	Founded in 1875 for Irish immigrants, current church dedicated in 1967
St. Philip		622 Putnam Pike, Greenville	Founded in 1858, reverted to mission status in the 1870s. Became a parish again in 1942, current church dedicated in 1989

=== Woonsocket ===
Name	Image	Location	Description/notes
Holy Trinity Parish		Holy Family Church, 414 S Main St, Woonsocket	Merged into Holy Trinity Parish in 2018
		Our Lady, Queen of Martyrs Church, 1409 Park Ave, Woonsocket	Merged into Holy Trinity Parish in 2018
St. Agatha and Precious Blood Parishes		St. Agatha Church, 34 Joffre Ave, Woonsocket	Founded in 1953, partnered with Precious Blood Parish
		L'Eglise du Precieux Sang (Precious Blood), 94 Carrington Ave, Woonsocket	Founded in 1873 for French-Canadian immigrants. Partnered with St. Agatha Parish. listed on NRHP
St. Anthony		128 Greene St, Woonsocket	Founded in 1924 for Italian immigrants, current church dedicated in 1928
St. Joseph		1200 Mendon Rd, Woonsocket	
St. Stanislaus Kostka		174 Harris Ave, Woonsocket	Founded in 1905 for Polish immigrants

=== Other communities ===
Name	Image	Location	Description/notes
St. Eugene		1251 Putnam Pike,Chepachet	Founded in 1956
St. Paul The Apostle		116A Danielson Pike, Foster	Founded in 1972
St. Joseph		183 Sayles Ave, Pascoag	Founded in 1884, reverted to a mission in 1886, current church dedicated in 1932
St. Joseph		144 Danielson Pike, Scituate	Founded in the early 1900s, became a parish in 1940, current church dedicated in 1973

== Bristol County ==
=== Barrington ===
Name	Image	Location	Description/notes
Holy Angels		341 Maple Ave, Barrington	Founded in 1913, current church dedicated in 1963
St. Luke		108 Washington Rd, Barrington	Founded as a mission in 1936, church dedicated in 1939, became a parish in 1942

=== Bristol ===
Name	Image	Location	Description/notes
Our Lady of Mt. Carmel		141 State St, Bristol	Founded in 1917
St. Elizabeth		577 Wood St, Bristol	
St. Mary		330 Wood St, Bristol	

=== Warren ===
Name	Image	Location	Description/notes
Saint Mary of the Bay		645 Main St, Warren	Founded in 1851, current church consecrated in 1970
		St. Alexander Church, 218 Main St, Warren	Founded in 2015. Merged into Saint Mary of the Bay Parish in 2023
St. Casimir		391 High St, Warren	Founded in 1908 to serve Polish immigrants
St. Thomas the Apostle		500 Metacom Ave, Warren	Founded in 1952 for Portuguese immigrants

== Kent County ==
=== Coventry ===
Name	Image	Location	Description/notes
SS. John and Paul		341 S Main St, Coventry	Founded in 1955
St. Vincent de Paul and Our Lady of Czenstochowa Parishes		St. Vincent de Paul Church, 6 St Vincent De Paul St, Coventry	Now partnered with Our Lady of Czenstochowa Parish Parish
		Our Lady of Czenstochowa Church, 445 Washington St, Coventry	Founded in 1905 to serve Polish immigrants. Now partnered with St. Vincent de Paul Parish

=== East Greenwich ===
Name	Image	Location	Description/notes
Our Lady of Mercy		65 3rd St, East Greenwich	Founded as Holy Name Church in 1853, later became Our Lady of Mercy. Current church dedicated in 1965

=== Warwick ===
Name	Image	Location	Description/notes
SS Rose and Clement		111 Long St, Warwick	
St. Gregory the Great		360 Cowesett Rd, Warwick	Founded in 1961
St. Kevin		333 Sandy Lane, Warwick	
St. Peter		360 Fair St, Warwick	Founded in 1933, church dedicated in 1936
St. Timothy & St. Rita Parishes		St. Timothy Church, 1799 Warwick Ave, Warwick	Now partnered with St. Rita Church
		St. Rita Church, 722 Oakland Beach Ave, Warwick	Now partnered with St. Timothy Church

=== West Warwick ===
Name	Image	Location	Description/notes
Christ the King		124 Legris Ave, West Warwick	Founded in 1931
Our Lady of Good Counsel		60 Pleasant St, West Warwick	Founded in 1903
Sacred Heart		820 Providence St, West Warwick	Parish founded for Italian immigrants, current church dedicated in 1929
St. Anthony		10 Sunset Ave, West Warwick	Current church dedicated in 1925, parish founded for Portuguese immigrants
SS. John & James and St. Mary Mission		St. John & James Church, 20 Washington St, West Warwick	Merged with St. Mary Mission in 2019
		St. Mary Mission, 68 Church St, West Warwick	Dedicated in 1844, St. Mary is the oldest Catholic church in the diocese. Merged with SS. John and James Parish in 2019. St. Mary is listed on the National Register of Historic Places (NRHP)
St. Joseph		854 Providence St, West Warwick	Founded in 1899
SS. Peter and Paul		48 Highland St, West Warwick	

== Newport County ==
=== Newport ===
Name	Image	Location	Description/notes
Jesus Saviour		509 Broadway, Newport	
St. Augustin		2 Eastnor Rd, Newport	Current church dedicated in 1911
St. Joseph		79-93 Broadway, Newport	Founded as parish in 1884, reverted to mission in 1886, became parish again in 1893. Current church dedicated in 1932
St. Mary		14 William St, Newport	Built in 1848, listed on the NRHP; John F. Kennedy and Jacqueline Bouvier wed there in 1953

=== Portsmouth ===
Name	Image	Location	Description/notes
St. Anthony		2836 E Main Rd, Portsmouth	Founded in 1908
St. Barnabas		1697 E Main Rd, Portsmouth	Founded in 1963, current church dedicated in 1965

=== Tiverton ===
Name	Image	Location	Description/notes
Holy Ghost		316 Judson St, Tiverton	Founded as a mission in 1913, current church dedicated in 1915. Became a parish in 1923
St. Madeleine Sophie		35 Lake Rd, Tiverton	Merged with St. Catherine of Siena in Little Compton in 2023. Now a secondary worship site
St. Theresa and St. Christopher Parish		St. Theresa Church, 265 Stafford Rd, Tiverton	Founded as a parish in 1960, current church dedicated in 1974. Now merged with St. Christopher Church
		St. Christopher Church, 1554 Main Rd, Tiverton	Current church dedicated in 1910. Now merged with St. Theresa Parish.

=== Other communities ===
Name	Image	Location	Description/notes
St. Mark		60 Narragansett Ave, Jamestown	Founded as a mission in 1893, current church dedicated in 1960
St. Catherine of Siena		74 Simmons Rd, Little Compton	Merged with St. Madeleine Sophie in Tiverton in 2023.
St. Lucy		909 W Main Rd, Middletown	Founded in 1951, current church dedicated in 1991

== Washington County ==
=== Kingstown area ===
Name	Image	Location	Description/notes
St. Bernard		275 Tower Hill Rd, North Kingstown	Founded in 1874
St. Francis de Sales		381 School St, North Kingstown	Founded in 1960, current church dedicated in 2011
Christ the King		180 Old North Rd, Kingston	Founded in 1960, church dedicated in 1966. Serves the University of Rhode Island community
St. Francis of Assisi		114 High Street, Wakefield,	Founded in 1879, current church dedicated in 1932
		St. Romuald Chapel, 61 Atlantic Avenue, Matunuck	Seasonal chapel operated by St. Francis of Assisi Parish

=== Narragansett ===
Name	Image	Location	Description/notes
St. Mary, Star of the Sea		864 Point Judith Rd,Narragansett	Founded as a parish in 1960,
St. Thomas More		Narragansett	Founded as a mission in the 1870s, became a parish in 1917. Current church dedicated in 1908

=== Westerly area ===
Name	Image	Location	Description/notes
St. Clare and St. Vincent de Paul Parishes		St. Clare Church, 4 St Clares Way, Westerly	Founded as a mission in the 1910s, current chapel dedicated in 1940. Now merged with St. Vincent de Paul Parish
		St. Vincent de Paul Church, 7 Church St, Bradford	Now merged with St. Vincent de Paul Parish
St. Pius X		44 Elm St, Westerly	

=== Other communities ===
Name	Image	Location	Description/notes
Our Lady of Victory		169 Main St, Ashaway	
St. Andrew		Spring St., New Shoreham, Block Island	
St. Mary		437 Carolina Back Rd, Carolina	
		St. James Chapel, 2079 Matunuck Schoolhouse Rd, Charlestown	Supervised by St. Mary Parish
Kateri Tekakwitha		84 Exeter Rd, Exeter	
St. Joseph		1105 Main St, Hope Valley	Founded as a mission in 1923, current church dedicated in 1940

=== Eastern Rite churches ===
Name	Image	Location	Description/notes
St. Basil the Great		15 Skyview Dr, Lincoln	MelKite Greek Catholic Church. Founded in 1909, current church dedicated in 1988
St. Michael		394 Blackstone St, Woonsocket	Ukrainian Catholic Church, founded in 1909,

=== Former churches ===
Name	Image	Location	Description/notes
All Saints		323 Rathbun St, Woonsocket	Opened as St. Aloysius Gonzaga in 1957, became All Saints in 2007, closed in 2022
Immaculate Conception		Westerly	Former church, built in 1886; now operated as a performance hall; listed on NRHP
Our Lady of Mount Carmel		12 Spruce St, Federal Hill, Providence	Opened in 1925; closed in 2015; sold in 2019 for redevelopment
Sacred Heart		415 Olo St, Woonsocket	Merged into Holy Trinity Parish in 2018, church closed
St. Ann		1493 Cranston St, Cranston	Founded in 1858, church dedicated in 1928. Church closed in 2013
St. Ann		83 Cumberland St, Woonsocket	Built in 1913; closed in 2000; converted to arts center; listed on NRHP
St. Benedict		135 Beach Ave, Warwick	Merged into St. Kevin Parish, church building closed in 2021
St. Brigid		1231 Plainfield St, Johnston	Parish closed in 2018, became a mission of St. Rocco Parish Closed in 2019
St. Casimir		348 Smith St, Providence	Parish formed in 1919 for ; Lithuanian immigrants; closed in 2017
St. Catherine		3252 Post Rd, Warwick	Merged into SS Rose and Clement Parish in 2021. Church sold in 2023.
St. Charles Borromeo		8 Daniels St, Woonsocket	Founded in 1846, Gothic church dedicated in 1871. Merged with All Saints Parish in 2019. Building listed on NRHP
St. Edward		396 Weeden St, Pawtucket	Closed in 2017
St. Elias		80 Hamilton St, Woonsocket	Melkite Greek Catholic Church, founded in the 1930s, merged into St. Basil the Great Parish, church closed
St. Francis of Assisi		618 Jefferson Blvd, Warwick	Merged into SS Rose and Clement Parish in 2021. Church sold in 2023
St. George Maronite		48 Main St, Pawtucket	Originally an Episcopal church built between 1852 and 1853. became St. George Maronite Catholic Church in 1977, destroyed by fire in 2005
St. Jean Baptiste		324 Main St, Warren	Church closed in 2017
St. Lawrence		Centredale	Church closed in 2010
St. Leo the Great		695 Central Ave, Pawtucket	Founded in 1916, church dedicated in 1917. Became part of John Paul II Parish in 2011. Closed in 2018
St. Patrick		Cumberland	Parish merged with St. Aidan Parish in 2018, church closed
