= Gilbane, Inc. =

National construction and real estate development company

Coordinates: 41.819071°N 71.415497°W

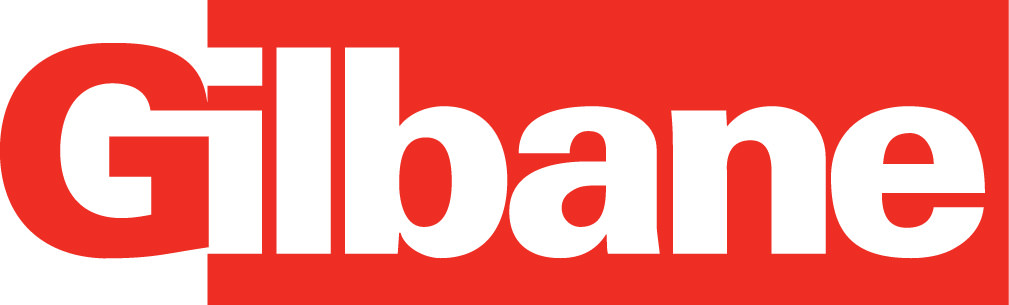
- Company type: Private
- Industry: Construction and real estate development
- Founded: 1870
- Founder: William H. Gilbane
- Headquarters: Providence, RI, United States
- Key people: Edward T. Broderick (CEO)
- Subsidiaries: Gilbane Building Company; Gilbane Development Company
- Website: https://www.gilbaneco.com/inc/

Gilbane, Inc. (Gilbane) is a national construction and real estate development firm. It is the parent organization of Gilbane Building Company and Gilbane Development Company. Gilbane, Inc. is a sixth-generation, family-owned business.

== History ==
=== Founding and early history ===
Gilbane has its roots to 1870 when founder William H. Gilbane started a carpentry and general contracting firm. His brother Thomas Gilbane joined him and the officially formed William Gilbane and Brother in 1883. The company first focused on building homes and later expanded to churches, hospitals and other buildings. Some of the earlier buildings they constructed include the Roger Williams Park Museum of Natural History and Planetarium and the Holy Name Church. Despite a fire destroying the company headquarters in 1897, Gilbane continued in business and in 1900 constructed a home for then Brown University president William Faunce. The construction established a relationship with the university by where Gilbane would later build an administrative building and the Brunonia Hall dormitory. By 1900, it employed more than 200 people.

Gilbane was officially incorporated as Gilbane Building Company in 1908. William H. Gilbane’s sons, William J. Gilbane and Thomas F. Gilbane, joined the company as president and vice president in the late 1930s and in 1943 the company was awarded the Army-Navy “E” Award by Under-Secretary of the Navy, James Forrestal.

Gilbane was involved with the construction of the 1964 New York World's Fair, mainly the IBM Corporation Pavilion, the India Pavilion, the Hawaii Pavilion and the New England States Pavilion. In 1970, Gilbane formed Gilbane Development Company, a sister company for real estate development, financing, construction, operations and management.

=== 2010 to present ===
In 2010, Gilbane acquired two separate companies: Innovative Technical Solutions, Inc. (ITSI), a California-based engineering and construction company on August 4, and W.G. Mills Inc., a construction management company based in Florida on November 15.

In 2014, William J. Gilbane Jr. became vice chair and director of Gilbane, Inc. In 2015, Gilbane Building Company named Michael McKelvy its president and chief operating officer. McKelvy was appointed CEO in 2016, succeeding Thomas F. Gilbane Jr., who remained at the company as chairman.

In 2016, Gilbane was named one of the top corporate charitable contributors by the Boston Business Journal. In 2018, Gilbane completed improvements to Fenway Park. In 2020, William J. Gilbane III was named to the Gilbane Inc. board of directors. In 2022, fifth-generation Gilbane family members, Daniel M. Gilbane and Paul J. Choquette III, were named to new leadership positions with the company with Gilbane named as Managing Director and President and Choquette as Regional President. As of 2024, Gilbane has more than 45 offices within the United States and internationally. In 2024, Adam Jelen assumed the role of President and CEO of Gilbane Building Company.

Notable projects from Gilbane Inc.'s subsidiary, Gilbane Building Company, include the 1964 New York World's Fair, the 1980 Winter Olympics facilities in Lake Placid, New York, the Vietnam Veterans Memorial and the National Air and Space Museum in Washington D.C., and the Fenway Park clubhouse improvements in Boston.

Notable projects of Gilbane’s other subsidiary, Gilbane Development Company, include facilities in Campustown for Iowa State University students and the first “purpose-built” student housing, 257 Thayer, in Providence, Rhode Island.

=== Partial list of projects ===
Year	Name	Image	Location	Description/notes
1964	1964 New York World's Fair		New York City	IBM Corporation Pavilion, the India Pavilion, the Hawaii Pavilion and the New England States Pavilion.
1982	Vietnam Veterans Memorial		Washington, D.C.	
1993	O'Hare International Airport		Chicago, Illinois	Terminal 5
2004	World War II Memorial		Washington, D.C.	
