= Santo Christo Church (Fall River, Massachusetts) =

Historic church in Massachusetts, United States

- Santo Christo Parish / Holy Christ Parish
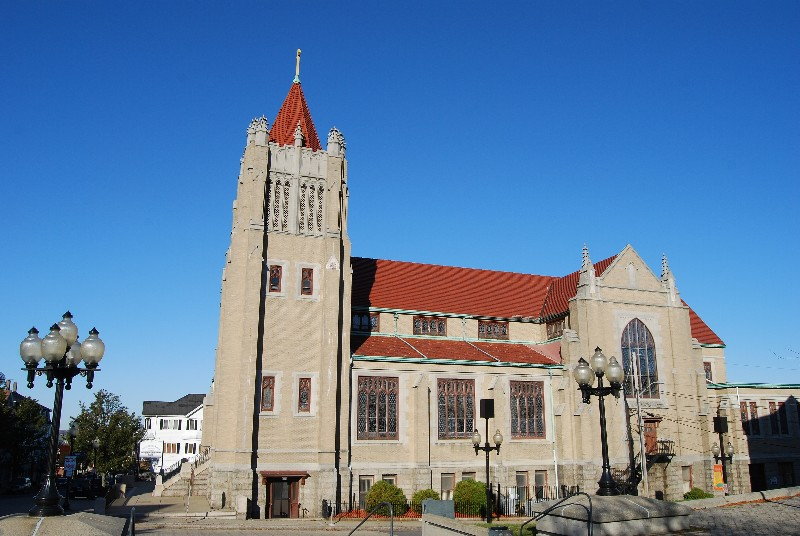
- Santo Christo Church
- Address: 185 Canal St, Fall River, MA 02721
- Country: United States
- Denomination: Roman Catholic
- Website: www.santochristo.com

History
- Status: Active
- Founder: Rev. Antonio Gomes da Silva Neves
- Dedication: Lord Holy Christ of the Miracles
- Dedicated: June 14, 1948

Architecture
- Architect: Murphy & Hindle
- Architectural type: Church
- Style: Gothic Revival
- Completed: 1948
- Construction cost: $150,000

Administration
- Diocese: Roman Catholic Diocese of Fall River

Clergy
- Rector: Very Rev. Jeffrey Cabral, J.C.L.

- Santo Christo Church
- U.S. National Register of Historic Places
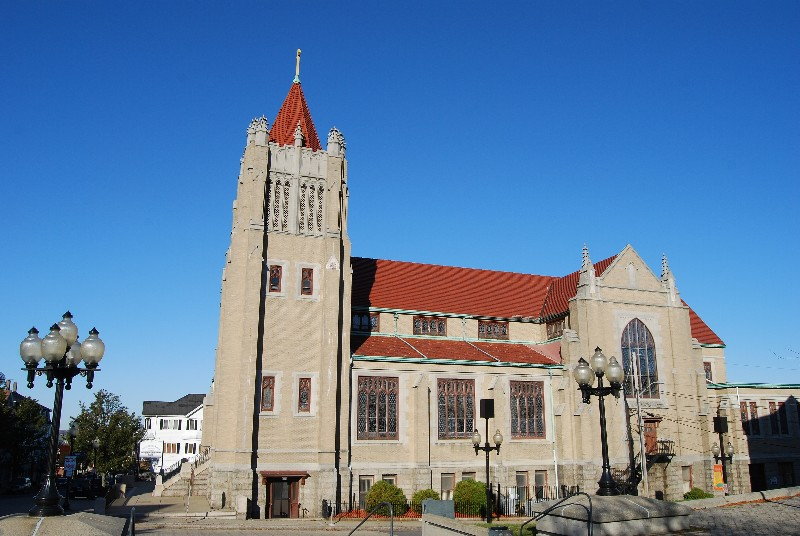

- Location within Massachusetts Location within the United States
- Location: Fall River, Massachusetts
- Coordinates: 41°42′1″N 71°9′48″W
- Built: 1924
- Architect: Murphy & Hindle
- Architectural style: Gothic Revival
- MPS: Fall River MRA
- NRHP reference No.: 83000715
- Added to NRHP: February 16, 1983

Santo Christo Church is an historic church located at 240 Columbia Street in Fall River, Massachusetts, dedicated to the Lord Holy Christ of the Miracles. The parish was formally established in 1889 to serve in the local Portuguese community, after two decades of itinerant services by priests from New Bedford.

The Gothic Revival-style church building was built in 1924–27 to a design by the architectural firm of Murphy & Hindle. It is stylistically subdued, but has fine stained glass windows, a tile roof with copper coping, and cast stone pinnacles.

The building was listed on the National Register of Historic Places in 1983. A building restoration project began in late 2013. As of July 2018 the pastor is the Very Rev. Jeffrey Cabral, J.C.L., who is also the Judicial Vicar for the Diocese of Fall River.

Masses are celebrated in English Sunday's at 10:00am and Portuguese Saturday at 4pm and Sunday 8am and 12pm (Summer hours: 8am and 11am).

== History ==
On May 4, 1889, the Portuguese Catholics purchased the Baptist chapel located on the corner of Columbia and Canal Streets. Before purchase, Protestants from the chapel attempted to convert the Portuguese. In late autumn of 1889, the chapel was inaugurated with a Solemn Mass, and St Anthony’s Mission was revived. It served the entire Portuguese Catholic community of Fall River. For the next three years it was under the direction of the pastor of St John the Baptist. Father Manuel C. Terra frequently said Mass at the mission. While in Fall River, visiting priests would lodge at the homes of parishioners. As the mission continued to grow, a burden was now placed on St John the Baptist Parish. Father Neves presented to Bishop Harkins the need for the mission to be elevated to parish status with its own clergy. On June 26, 1892, the mission became a parish and Father Cândido d’Ávila Martins was appointed its first pastor. At Father Neves’ suggestion the parish received a new name: “Senhor Santo Christo dos Milagres” (Holy Christ of the Miracles). Inexplicably, the name of the church was misspelled, as in Portuguese, there is no ‘H’ in Cristo.

From May 1889 to June 1892, the mission was under the care of St John the Baptist Parish in New Bedford; Holy Mass was celebrated here on Sundays only. The mission served the entire Portuguese Catholic population of Fall River. This building was the parish church until 1906.

== Current Church Building ==
Father Manuel Silva, third pastor of Santo Christo, had the present church constructed over the basement. Work on the upper church began in 1925; the exterior was completed in 1927. The bells in the tower were donated by Dentist Joseph Carvalho. In 1940, the fourth pastor Fr. Bettencourt made an appeal to the parishioners and started to collect funds for the completion of the interior of the upper church. The hard-working people of the parish were able to raise $100,000.

=== Plastering ===
The plastering of the upper started in the fall of 1941. Because of the Great Depression of the 1930s and our nation’s involvement in the Second World War (1941-45), the interior of the superstructure was not completed until 1948.

=== Dedication and Completion ===
Bishop James E. Cassidy blessed the new church on Sunday, June 13, 1948. On the following Sunday, a banquet was held at the State Armory on Bank Street, Fall River. Six years later, parishioners celebrated the final payment of the $150,000 debt incurred in 1925 with the building of the exterior walls. Festivities began on April 24, 1954, with a Te Deum presided by Father Bettencourt with Fathers Anthony Gomes and Daniel Freitas. On the next day, Bishop James L. Connolly (who succeeded Bishop Cassidy in May 1951) presided over a Mass of thanksgiving; that evening, at a banquet held at the State Armory, the mortgage was burned.

== 2013 Restoration ==
In the fall of 2013 a major restoration of the church building began. The renovation of the exterior, envisioned to be carried out in three phases, would consist of a restored belfry; new protective covers and frames for the stained glass windows; the replacement of clay roof tiles with asphalt shingles; new gutters; new front and side doors; and the repair of all leaks. The initial phase involved the church façade and tower. As of the spring of 2017, Phase 2 was nearly completed (restoration of the nave’s exterior walls, windows and roof; new front and side doors), with expenses thus far totaling $1.25 million — much less than was originally estimated. Phase 3 involves the exterior walls and roof of the north (sanctuary) end of the church. The fourth and last phase of the building restoration will involve the interior: plaster repairs, lighting upgrades, and fresh paint.

== See also ==
- Cult of the Lord Holy Christ of the Miracles
- National Register of Historic Places listings in Fall River, Massachusetts
