= Cult of the Lord Holy Christ of the Miracles =

Religious veneration

Senhor Santo Cristo dos Milagres Festa do Senhor Santo Cristo dos Milagres
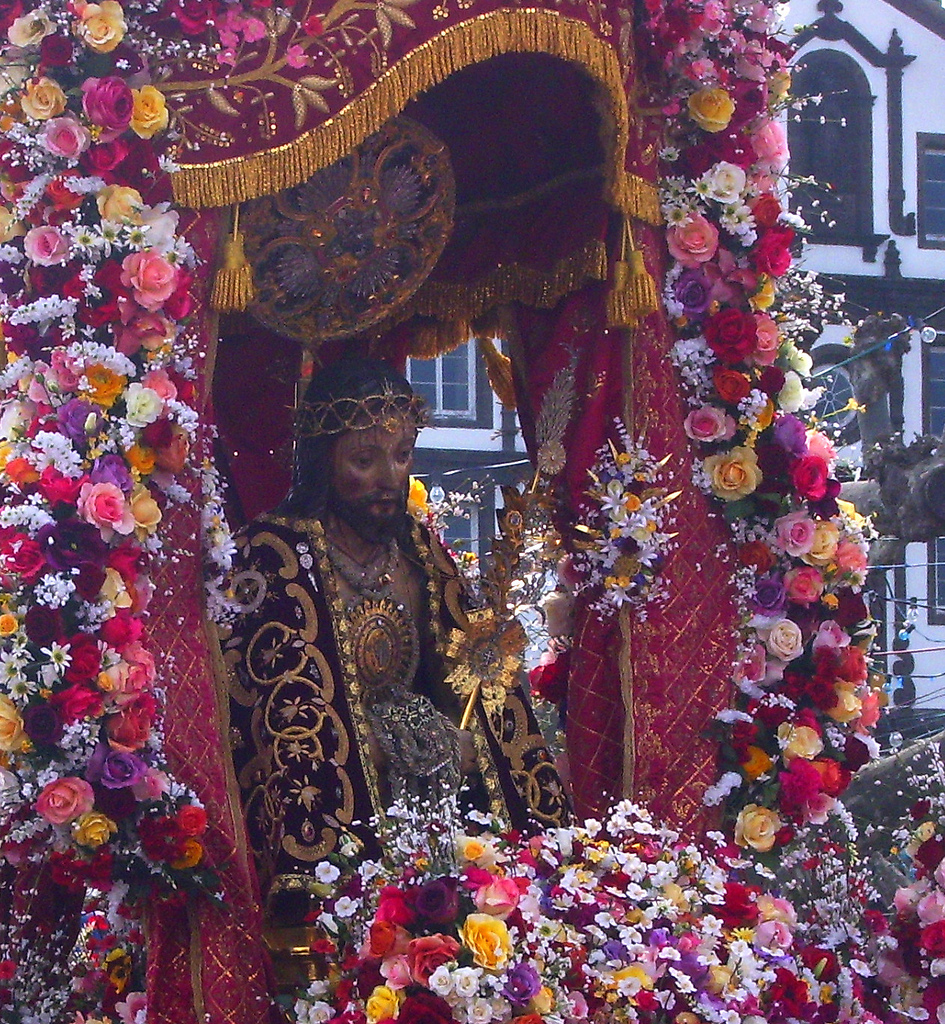
- The image of The Lord Holy Christ of the Miracles at the beginning of the procession in His honour in Ponta Delgada, Azores.
- Status: Active
- Genre: Religious Feast
- Date: Fifth Sunday of Easter
- Begins: Fifth Sunday of Easter
- Ends: Ascension Thursday
- Frequency: Annually
- Venue: Campo de São Francisco
- Locations: Ponta Delgada, Azores
- Country: Portugal
- Years active: 1700
- Inaugurated: 13 April 1700
- Founder: Venerable Mother Teresa da Anunciada
- Most recent: 24 April 2016
- Previous event: 3 May 2015
- Next event: 14 May 2017
- Website: www.senhorsantocristo.com www.santo-cristo.com

The Cult of the Lord Holy Christ of the Miracles (Portuguese: Culto do Senhor Santo Cristo dos Milagres), popularly known as Senhor Santo Cristo or Santo Cristo dos Milagres is a religious veneration associated with an image of Jesus Christ, depicted in the events of the New Testament (presented in Luke 23:1-25). The wooden image of Christ, by unknown artist, in a Renaissance-style representation of the Ecce Homo, represents the episode of Jesus of Nazareth's life when the martyred religious figure was presented to the crowd following his whipping, and includes a crown of thorns, uncovered torso and bruised/beaten body. Narrated in the New Testament, the artist represented in grande artistic style the contrast between violence on the body and the serenity of the expression, emphasized by the gaze from the image.

Normally, this statue and piece of art is on display in the Sanctuary of the Lord Holy Christ, in the Convent of Our Lady of Hope (in Ponta Delgada, on the island of São Miguel in the Azores), but annually leads a procession through the streets of the city. The festivals in honour of the Lord Holy Christ of the Miracles occur on the fifth Sunday after Easter, the day on which a great procession winds the streets of the provincial capital, and terminating on the Thursday of Ascension. These events are the most and oldest religious devotions still carried out in Portugal, with the popular feasts at the Sanctuary of the Sovereign Mother, in Loulé, and the 20th century celebrations in honour of Our Lady of Fátima having comparable interest. Annually, the celebrations in Ponta Delgada attract thousands of Azoreans, Luso-descendants and peoples from the various islands of the archipelago to São Miguel.

== History ==
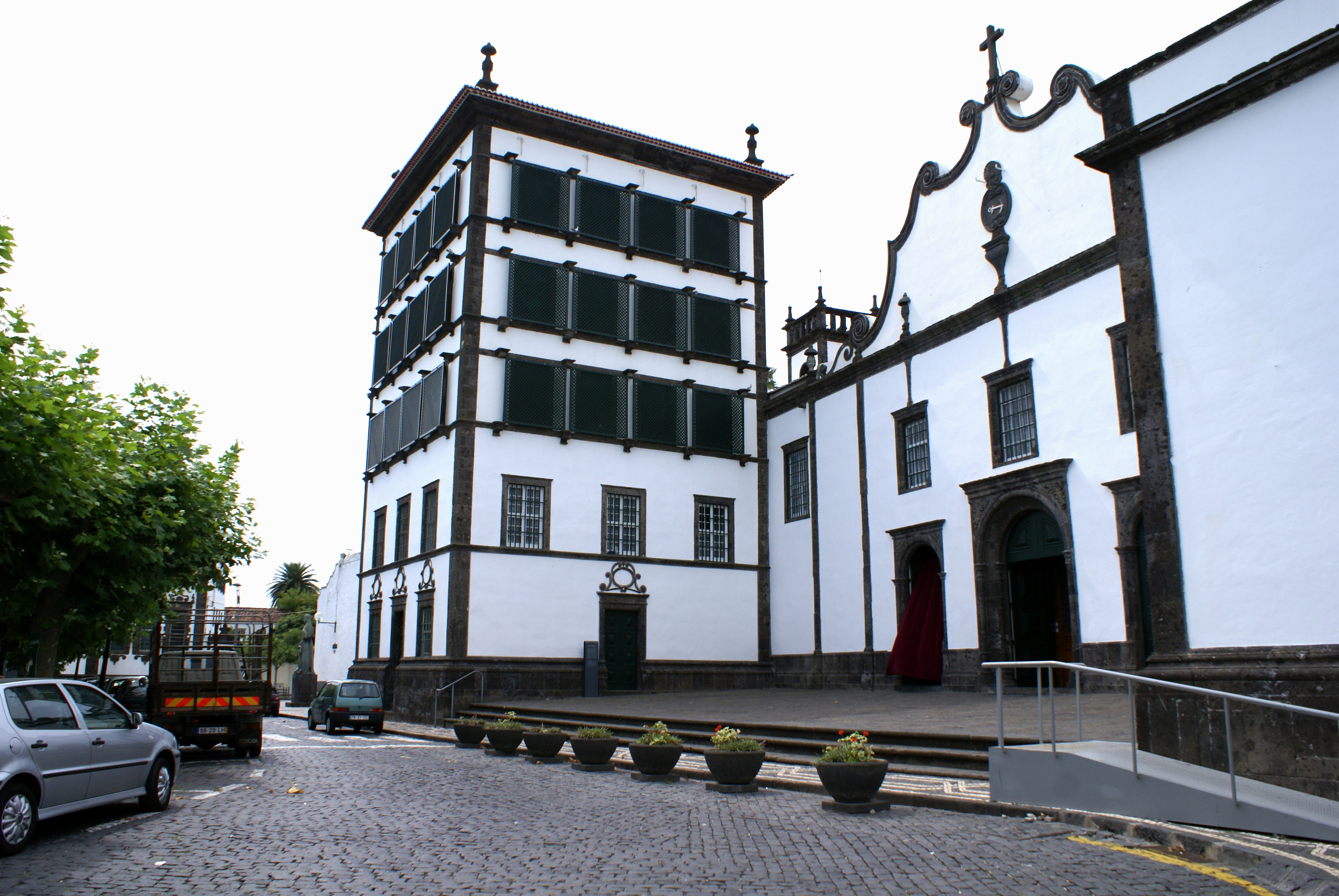
The Convent of Our Lady of Hope, in Ponta Delgada, Azores, is the sanctuary of the Lord Holy Christ of the Miracles.

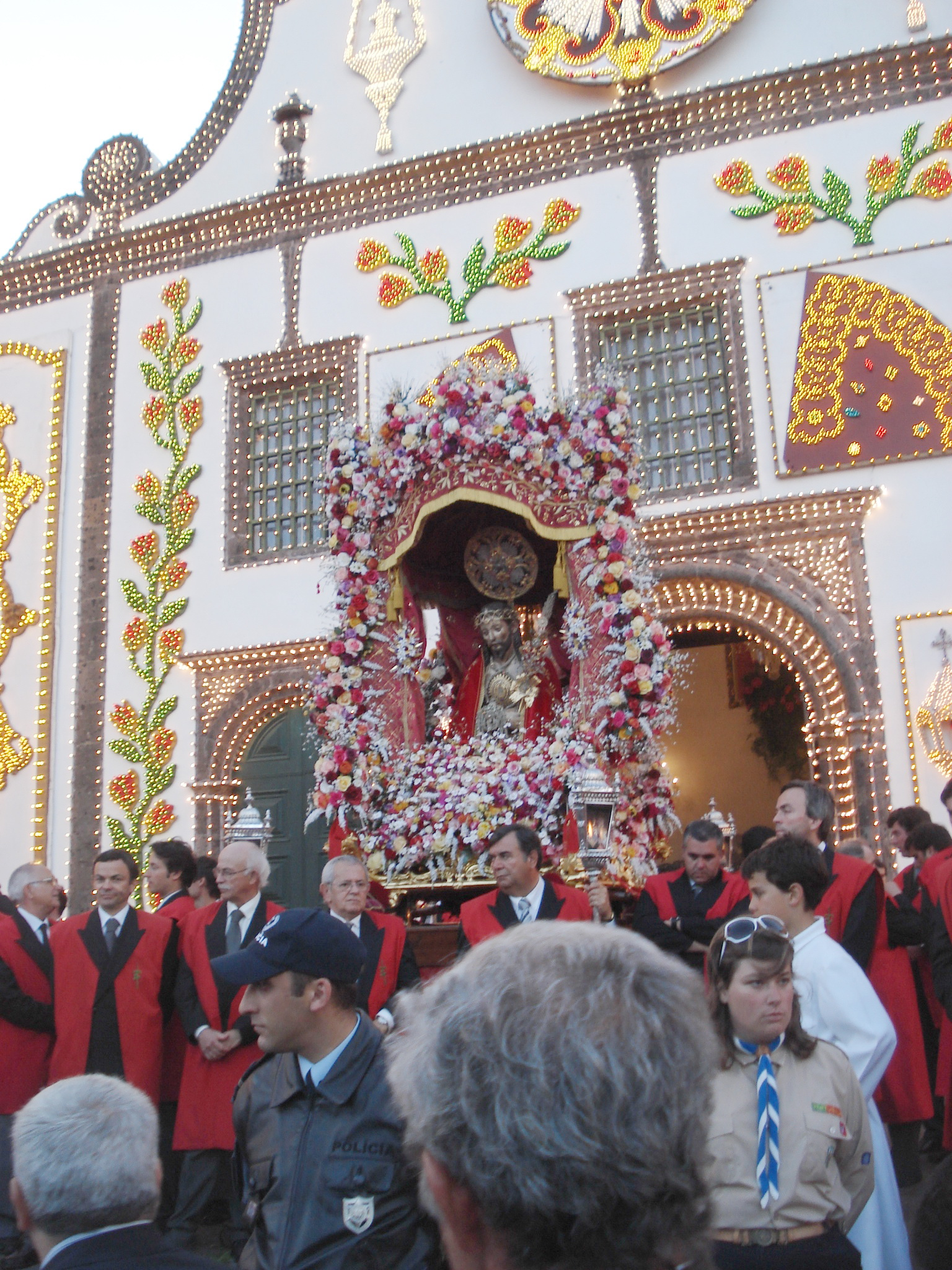
The exit of the image of the Lord Holy Christ of the Miracles from the Convent at the beginning of the annual procession.

The foundations of this cult began in the formation of the Convent of Caloura, which was established by the two daughters of Jorge da Mota, a resident of Vila Franca do Campo, whom had sheltered in the small Vale de Cabaços. Documentation attributes Pope Paul III (1534-1549) with the gift of the image to the religious curia whom visited Rome in order to obtain a pontifical bull to authorize the foundation of the first convent on the island of São Miguel. Yet, similar documents suggest the gift of the image of Christ was attributed to his predecessor, Pope Clement VII (1523-1534). Regardless, the image was placed in a niche, where it was maintained for a few years.

Owing to the Convent of Caloura's position over a clifftop by the sea, it was susceptible to attacks by pirates and corsairs, then abundant in the waters of the archipelago at the time. Consequently, many of the sisters moved to the newer convents that became constituted in areas with more protection, including the Convent of Saint Andrew (in Vila Franca do Campo) and the Convent of Our Lady of Hope (in Ponta Delgada). It was in the latter that Mother Inês de Santa Iria, a nun originating from Galicia, moved with the image of the "Ecce Homo" in 1541, where it remained. The Convent was founded by Rui Gonçalves da Câmara and his wife Filipa Coutinho, who had stayed with a group of the sisters in Vale de Cabeças after the 1522 Vila Franca earthquake.

The devotion to the image and what it represented began in the 17th and 18th centuries, following the principles adopted by the Catholic Church, following the Council of Trent, in the defense of the cult and veneration of images, following the Protestant Reformation. The veneration of this image of Christ came at the impulse of Venerable Mother Teresa da Anunciada. The nun entered the Convent of Esperança in the 17th century, along with her biological sister Joana de Santo António, both noble born and with strong personalities. Teresa da Anunciada was profoundly devout and, fed by her saintly character, inspired many to refer to her as "Mother", even as she was not a Reverend Mother Superior. From the moment of her entrance to the convent, Mother Teresa da Anunciada adopted an attitude of profound devotion to the image of the "Ecce Homo", building an intimate relationship and treating the image in honorifics, such as seu Senhor and seu Fidalgo. The two sisters were supported by the supposed miraculous character of the image. Joana de Santo António, before being transferred to the Convent of Saint Andrew, alerted the locals to the miraculous character of one of the patterns that covered the visible breast of the image. Mother Teresa da Anunciada not only made efforts to exalt the image of the "Ecce Homo", but also called for religious vassalage and adherence in the name of Jesus Christ. Although impeded by the abbess of the convent, she was able to erect a chapel for the image and adorn it with regalia associated with a monarch. To this end, she accepted donations from numerous faithful from around the island, from the Kingdom and some from overseas. It was following the visit of José Rodrigo da Câmara and the Princess Rohan to the Convent in 1690, that the incremental leap associated with this veneration took form. Pedro II of Portugal, by regal decree dated 2 September 1700, conceded an annuity of 12,000 réis in order to maintain an olive oil lamp in front of the altar to Senhor Santo Cristo.

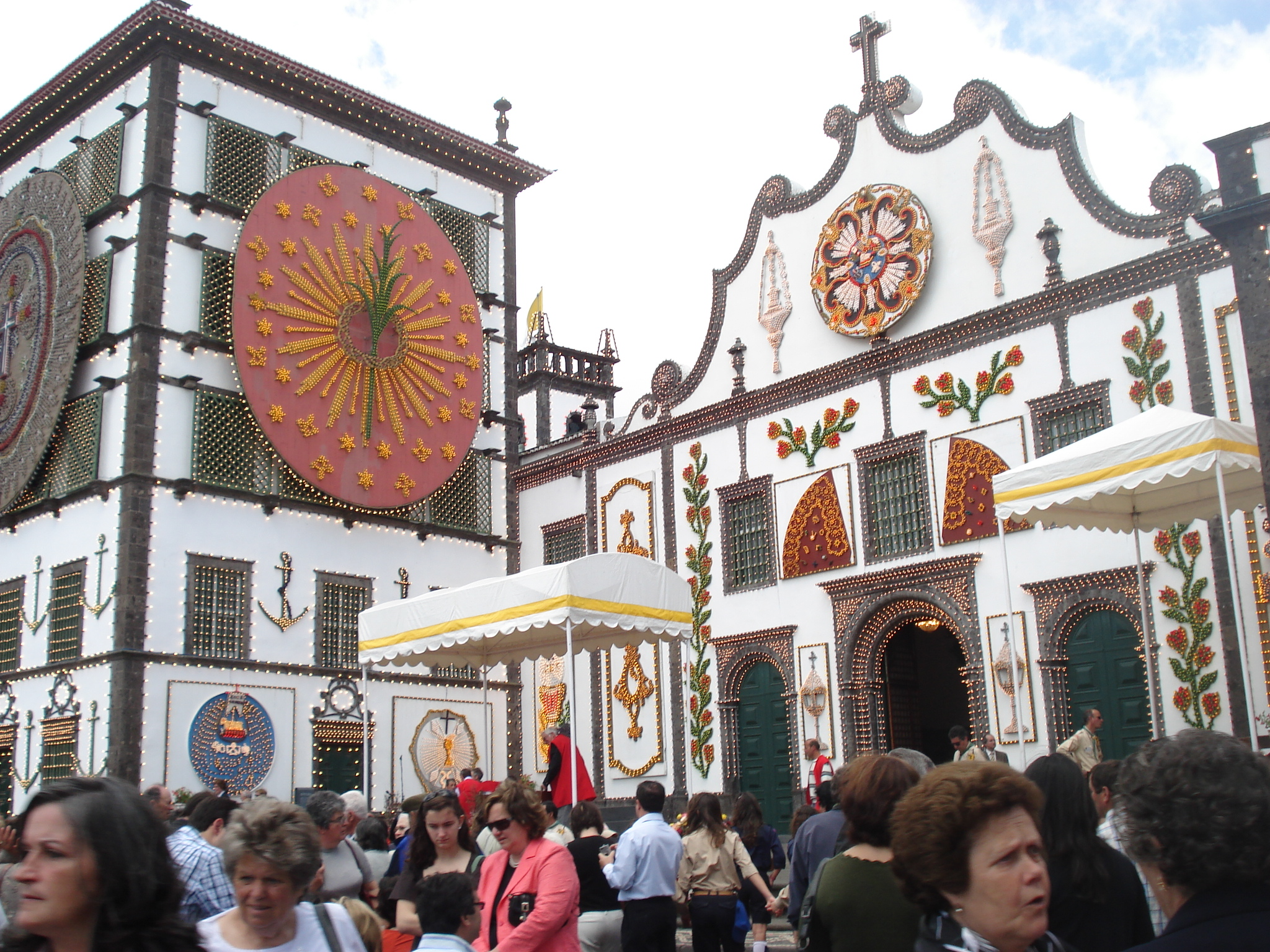
The decorated facade of the Convent of Our Lady of Hope, the sanctuary of the Lord Holy Christ of the Miracles.

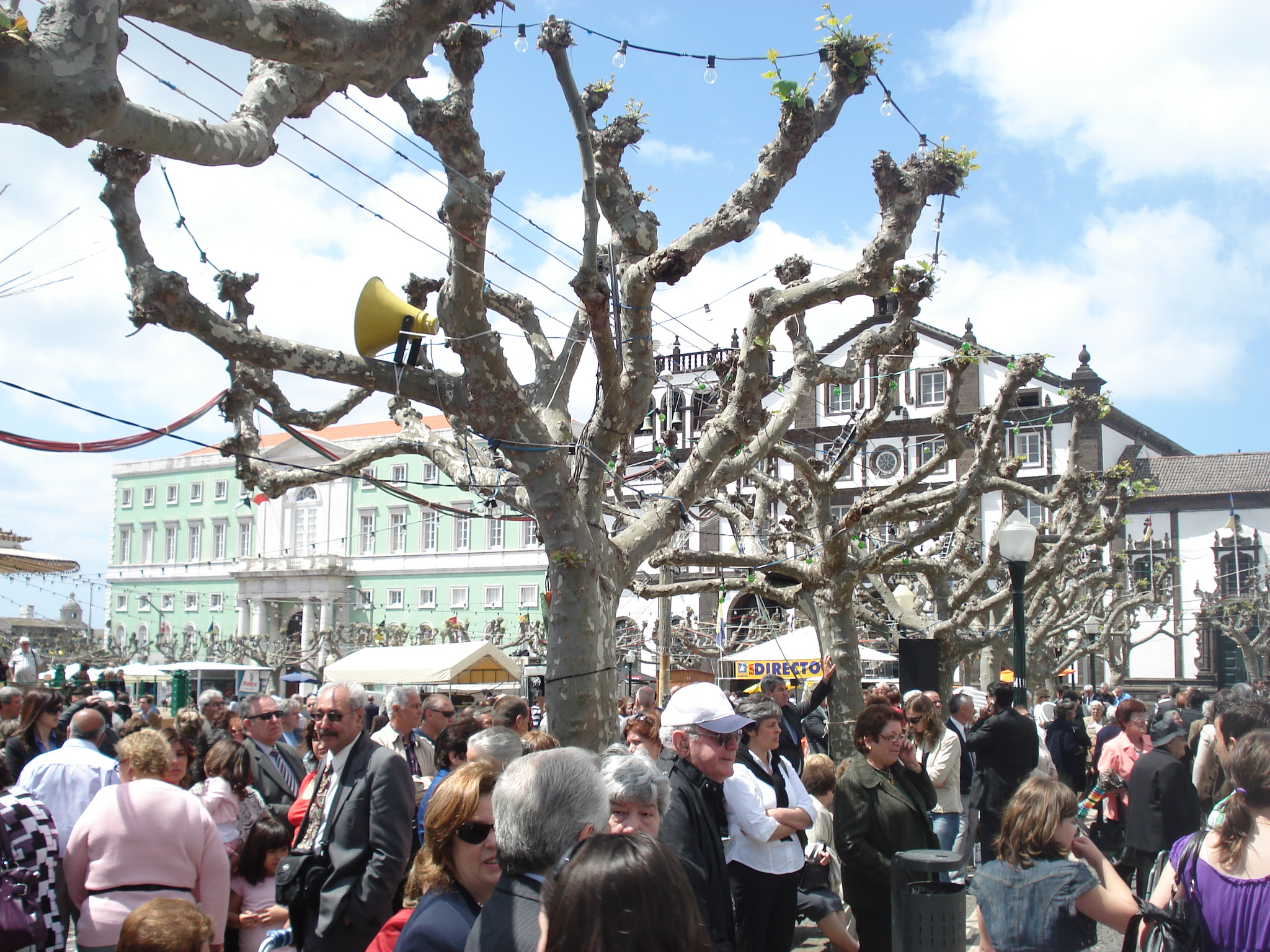
The Campo de São Francisco square following the traditional open-air mass.

In 1700, the island of São Miguel was rocked by tremors and earthquakes, which lasted several days. Influenced by the nun, the council of the Misericórdia and the nobles of the city, decided to take the image of Santo Cristo in procession from the Convent through the city. This they believe would temper God's response and curtail the unceasing tremors on the island. The sister organized and institutionalized many of the characteristic rituals of the annual procession, including the first appearance of confeitos (sugar candies) and the ceremonial traditions that have rigidly followed the celebration, with the support and collaboration of the local populous. This included the movements of the dolly from the lower choir to the altar, before exiting the Church and circling the Campo de São Francisco: all choreographed by the Sister Anunciada.

At the beginning of the afternoon, on 13 April 1700, the brotherhoods and religious communities gathered at the Convent, along with the nobles and crowd of faithful who believed that Divine intervention would occur at the appearance of the holy image. The date of this first procession is a point of controversy: the fisherman Urbano de Moendonça Dias recorded it as 11 April 1700, while Luciano Mota Vieira suggested it was in the year 1698. Upon its appearance there was an outcry of emotion, tears and exaltation, in addition to testimonies of anguish from the faithful. Many of the poor followed the procession barefoot (owing to the poverty at the time), while the members of the nobility carried the statue in the direction of the Convent of Saint Andrew. This act was similar what to the Captain-Donatário and his entourage did in the early years of the procession: the high nobility and members of authority, in their finest clothes, followed or participated in the movement of the image throughout the streets. In reality, the procession lead a circuitous route stopping at the convents along the route, with the choirs singing "Miserere mei Deus", stopping at: the Convent of Saint Francis (today the Church of Saint Joseph); Convent of Grace; Convent of Saint John (today the location of the Theatre Micalense); Convent of Saint Andrew (today the main Carlos Machado Museum); the Convent of the Jesuit College (the Church of the Jesuit College); and Convent of the Conception (today the Palace and Church of the Conception).

It was the celebrations of 17 December 1713, when the procession assumed an unparalleled acclamation of its populous. Earthquakes had been plaguing the islands of the archipelago, affecting directly the lives of the peoples of Ginetes, Candelária and Mosteiros: riverbeds erupted in sulphureous fumaroles and tremors plagued the islanders. The leaders of Ponta Delgada decided to bring the image out and complete a procession to the convents and churches wherein all the participants would be barefoot. Yet, on leaving the Church of the Jesuit College, in the direction of the Convent of Saint Andrew, the holy image (to the wonder and amazement of all) fell outside the grounds, and immediately all seismic activities ceased. This was seen as divine intervention; some supplicated themselves on the ground at the place that image fell, praying to God and asking for pity, others flagellating themselves, while others cried out their faults and begged God for His intersession. Meanwhile, there was little damage to the image (apart from observed damage on the right arm), and the image was washed and cleaned at the Convent of Saint Andrew. As the procession continued, the tears and sobs of the distressed faithful continued well into the night even as they returned to the Convent of Our Lady of Hope.

== Rituals ==
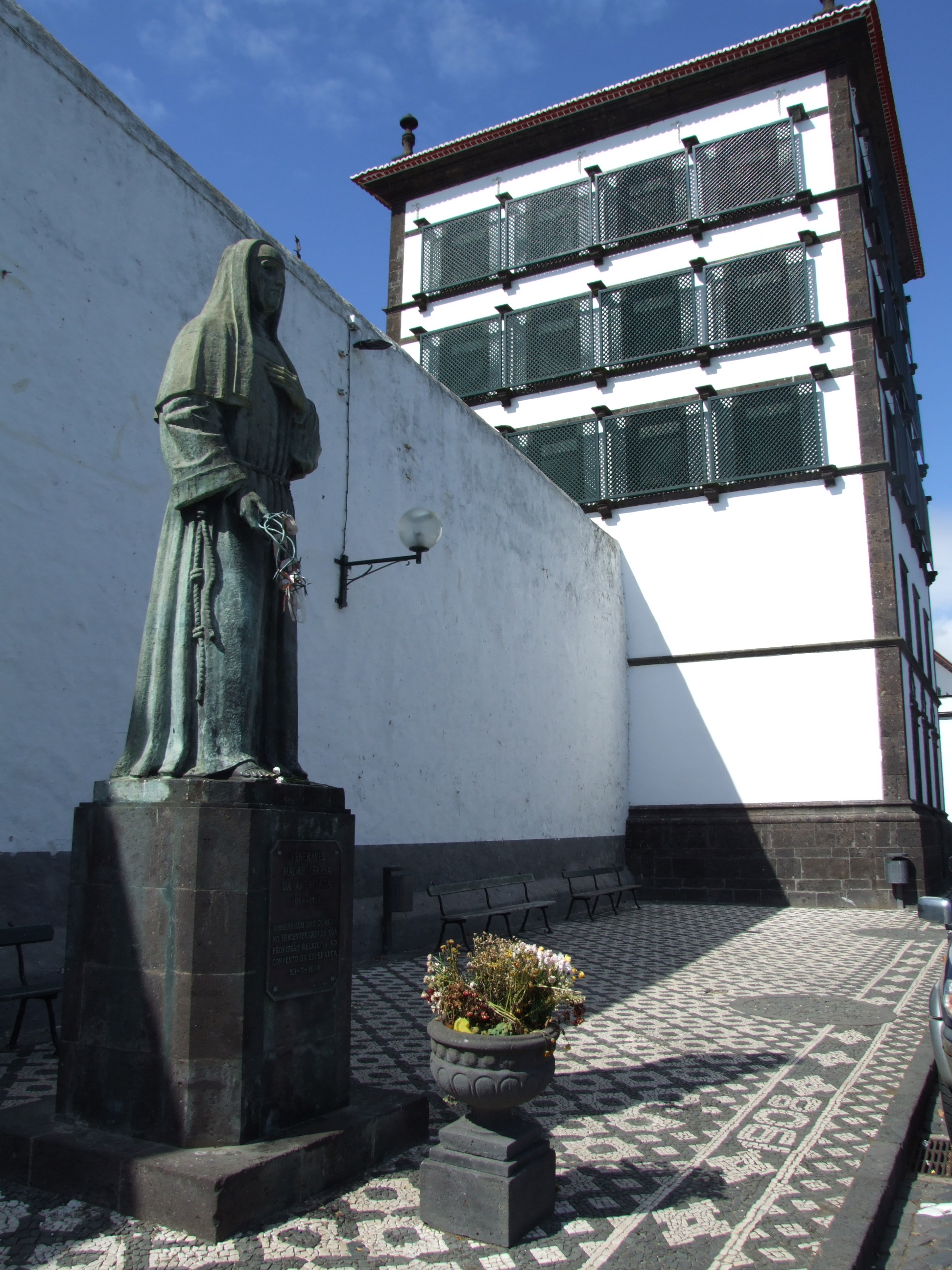
The statue of Venerable Mother Teresa da Anunciada in front of the Convent of Our Lady of Hope. She was the person most dedicated to the Cult of the Lord Holy Christ of the Miracles.

During these celebrations, the Brotherhood in conjunction with the sisters organize the illumination of the Convent of Our Lady of Hope and lighting of the Campo de São Francisco. Locals and visitors to the region normally congregate in the square, by the lights of the fancifully decorated tower and Church facade of the Church of Nossa Senhora da Esperança.

On the Saturday proceeding the procession, many devotees present themselves to the image of the Lord Holy Christ of the Miracles and make promises to God, at many times on their knees travelling along Campo de São Francisco. In the afternoon, the image is delivered by the sisters of the convent to the Brotherhood responsible for the celebrations. At this time, the image is moved to the altar of the Church of Our Lady of Hope, where it remains until Sunday. In reality, this tradition was altered, and for need of space, the image has been transferred to the nearby Church of Saint Joseph (across the Campo de São Francisco from the Convent).

Between Saturday and Sunday morning many faithful gather and stand watch in adoration of the image, with some traveling in pilgrimage to the Church from around the island.

On the Sunday afternoon is the grand procession: the cortege runs through the principal arterial of the city, passing the churches and convents of the city.

=== Procession ===
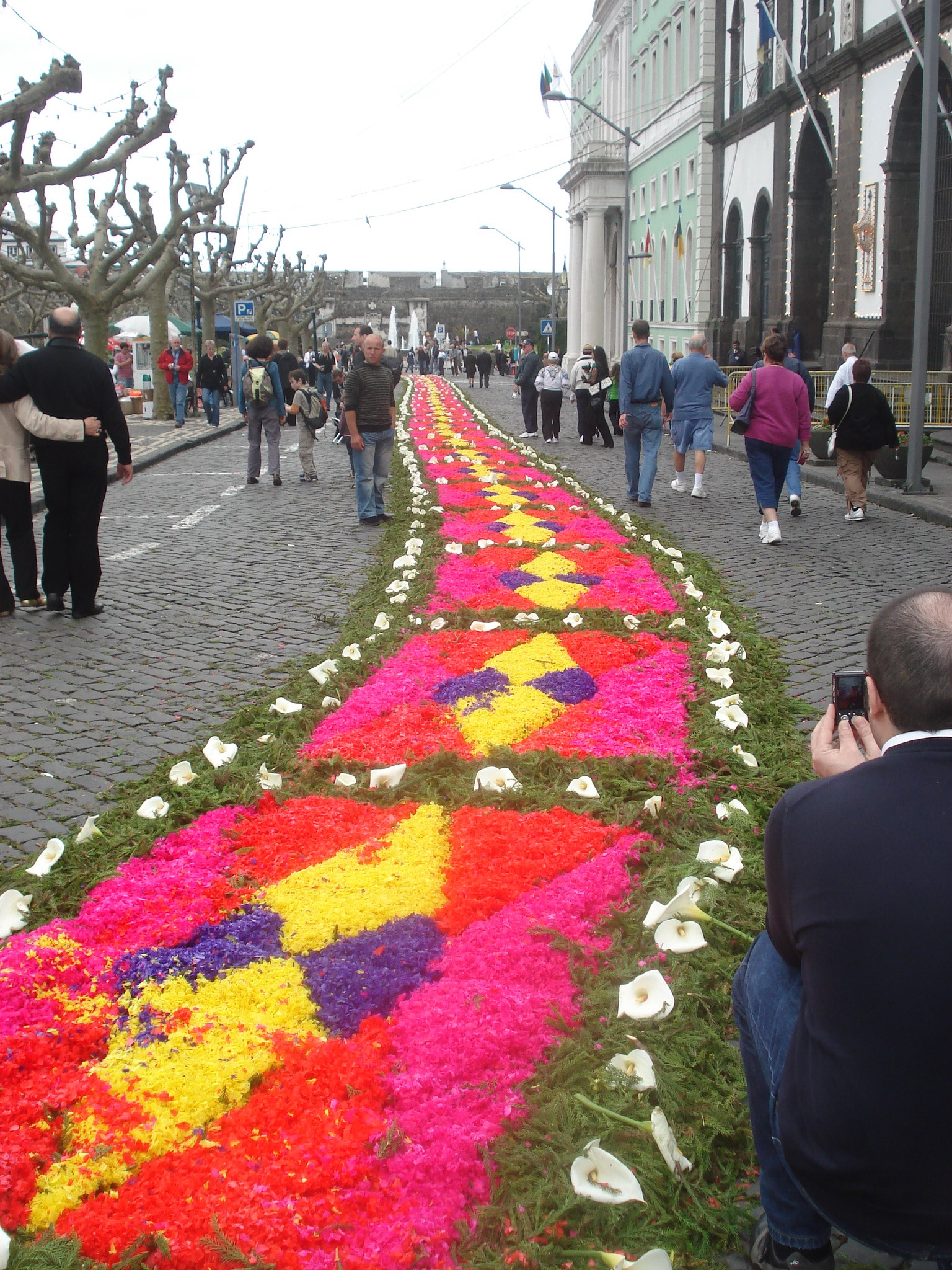
The flowered tapestry path leading from the Convent of Hope: the route of the procession is marked by the flower-laid mats.

The first procession in honour of the Lord Holy Christ of the Miracles occurred through the initiative of Mother Teresa da Anunciada, with the support of the island population, following a series of earthquakes where the nun hoped to obtain divine intervention. To this end, the image was moved to the altar of the Convent, then left the Church and followed a route to the other churches and convents of Ponta Delgada. From documents of the period, at the appearance the image at the doors of Esperança there was a commotion from the gathered crowd and the earth tremors stopped.

During the celebrations the crowd and image circles the Campo de São Francisco and Convent of Our Lady of Hope (site of the sanctuary) in a profound devotion, faith and respect. In addition to the homage to the image of Christ, several faithful pay "promises" to God during these celebrations, usually involving exchanges for grants by God.

Throughout most of the year, the image is guarded in the chapel/sanctuary of the Convent, located in the Church of Nossa Senhora da Esperança, opposite the main altar, separated by glass and iron grade that runs through the Church's nave.

Following the first procession, the tradition of running the streets of the city with the image has continued annually, with some interruptions due to rare meteorological circumstances.

== Sanctuary ==
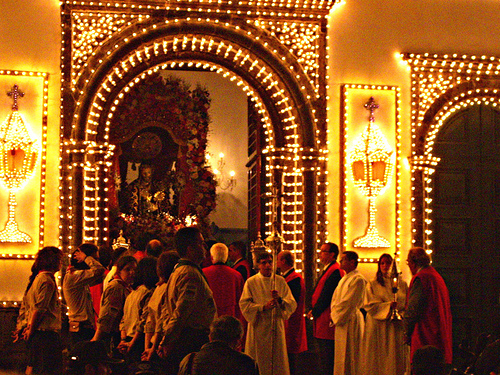
The return of the image of the Lord Holy Christ to the Convent of Our Lady of Hope.

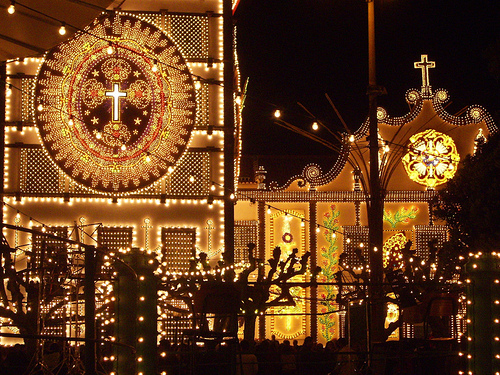
The illuminated Convent and Shrine of the Lord Holy Christ of the Miracles.

Until the intervention of Mother Teresa da Anunciada, the image of the Lord Holy Christ of the Miracles was on display in a small altar below the lower choir. The nun succeeded in construction of a new altar for the image, that embodied the affinity of her veneration and devotion. In reality, though, the conditions were not adequate since the dust accumulated from the high-choir on to the image, and the floorboards were noisy, creating distractions during meditation. With this, the sister attempted to erect a more solemn, dignified chapel for the image, with the support of the population and donatives from the Crown.

The primitive chapel today does not exist. This chapel was completed and consecrated on 5 March 1771, in a transitional Baroque-to-Rococo style. The entrance to this chapel, through the low choir is guarded by a series of azulejo ties, authored by António de Oliveira Bernardes, and dated to 1712, that represented the chapters in the birth (north) and passion of Christ (south). The interior of the chapel are azulejos executed by the Royal Factory of Rato (Portuguese: Real Fábrica do Rato) in Lisbon, from 1786 to 1787.

=== Treasure ===
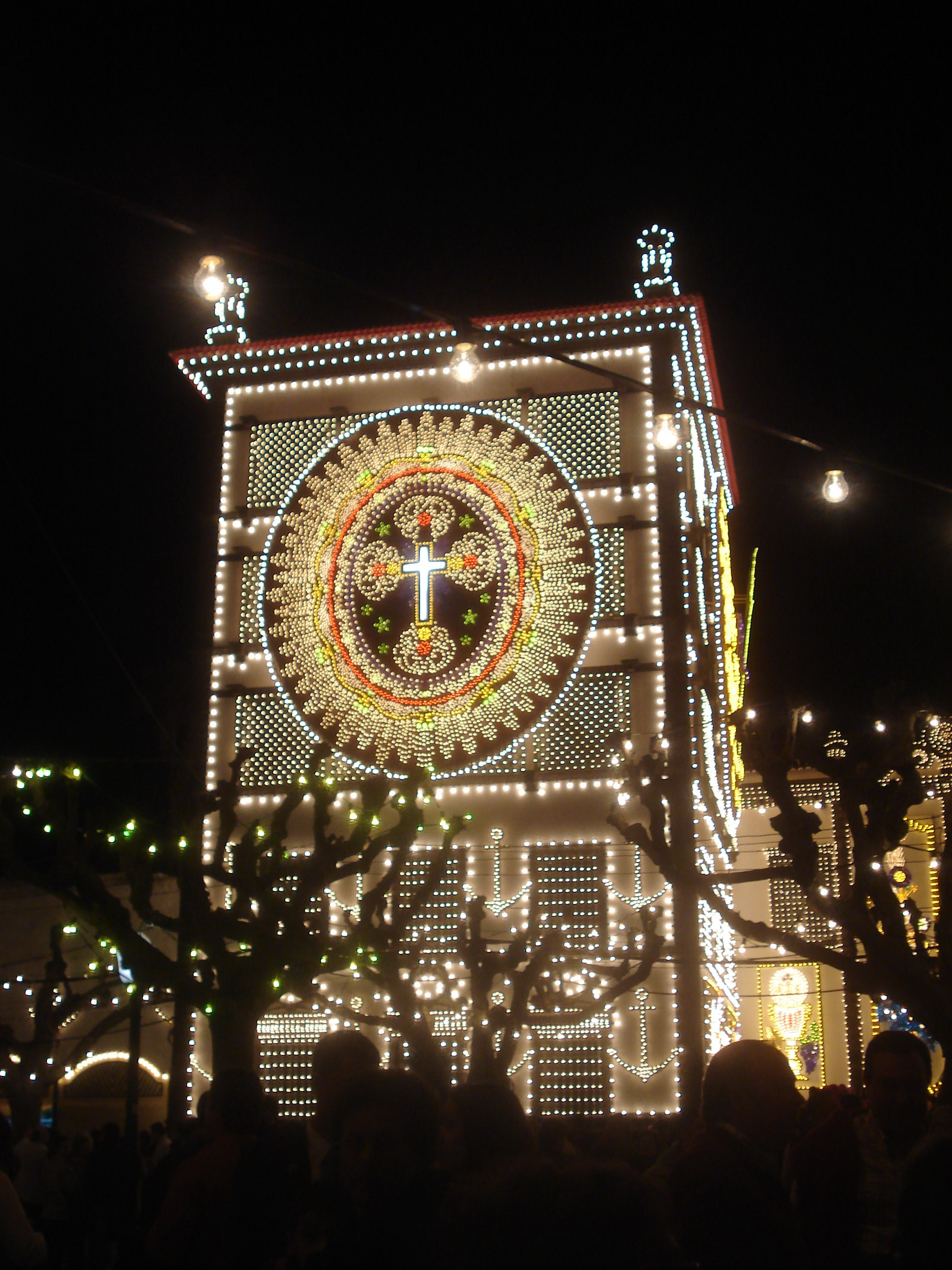
The illuminated Campo de São Francisco and tower of the Convent of Our Lady of Hope during the evenings prior to the procession date.

The treasure of the Lord Holy Christ of the Miracles includes a group of jewellery and decorative pieces that adorn the image, including specifically the various capes that have been draped on the torso. Decorated with twine of gold and silver, and several precious stones, it represents one of the major treasures from the second half of the 18th century. The elements of this reliquary include donatives from faithful, nobles and members of the Portuguese crown, who have made promises to God, and reimbursed in kind.

Many of these treasures came from the influence of Mother Teresa da Anunciada, who originally sought to ennoble the simple "Ecco Homem" image, her "master and noble". Many of the pieces were contributed long after her death (16 May 1738); José da Câmara and his wife Margarida Tomásia contributed the sceptre, the Crown of Thorns, the reliquary on the image's breast, rope and glitter that adorns the image as decoration, that included pearls, topaz, emeralds and other precious stones. The first sceptre, which was made of silk flowers, was originally ordered by Anunciada from the Mother Jerónima do Sacramento in the Convent of Santo André.

The various red capes, which drape the torso, are donations from local communities or from the immigrants in the Portuguese diaspora. Many believe that following their blessing, the capes offer a miraculous power to heal the sick.

The first stretcher used to carry the image was richly decorated in flowers, was designed and decorated by Mother Teresa da Anunciada for the first procession. Few alterations have been made to this platform.

== The expansion of the "cult" around the world ==
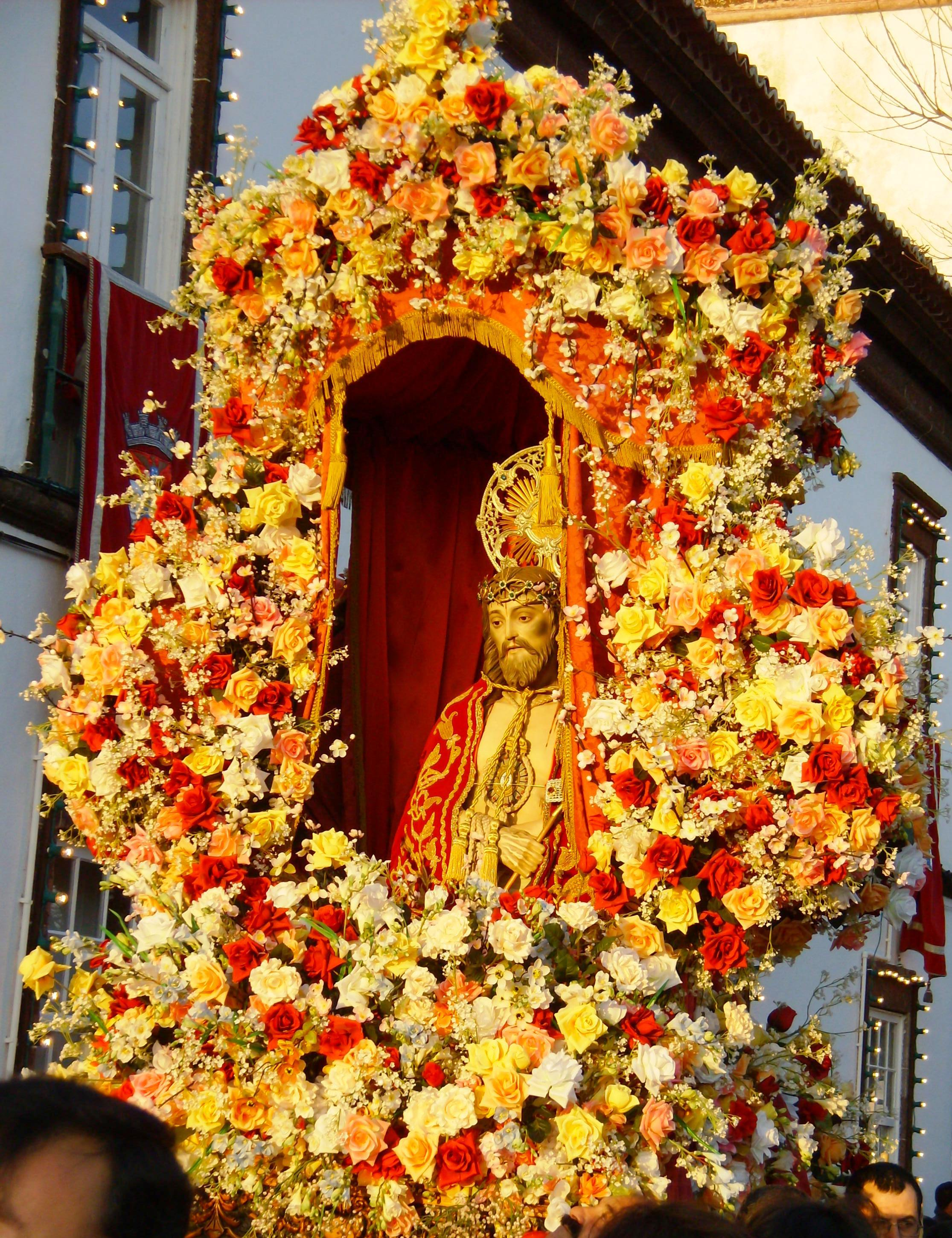
The image of the Lord Holy Christ of the Miracles in Vila do Porto, Santa Maria island.

The cult and the devotion of the Lord Holy Christ of the Miracles of Ponta Delgada on São Miguel island, quickly spread to the other islands of the Azores archipelago, having to that fact, above all, to the financial difficulties of the inhabitants of the other islands in it travel to Ponta Delgada to venerate the original image. Currently, the Lord Holy Christ of the Miracles is devoted throughout the islands, and, after Ponta Delgada, the largest feasts and processions dedicated to him are those of Vila do Porto, on the Santa Maria and Graciosa islands.

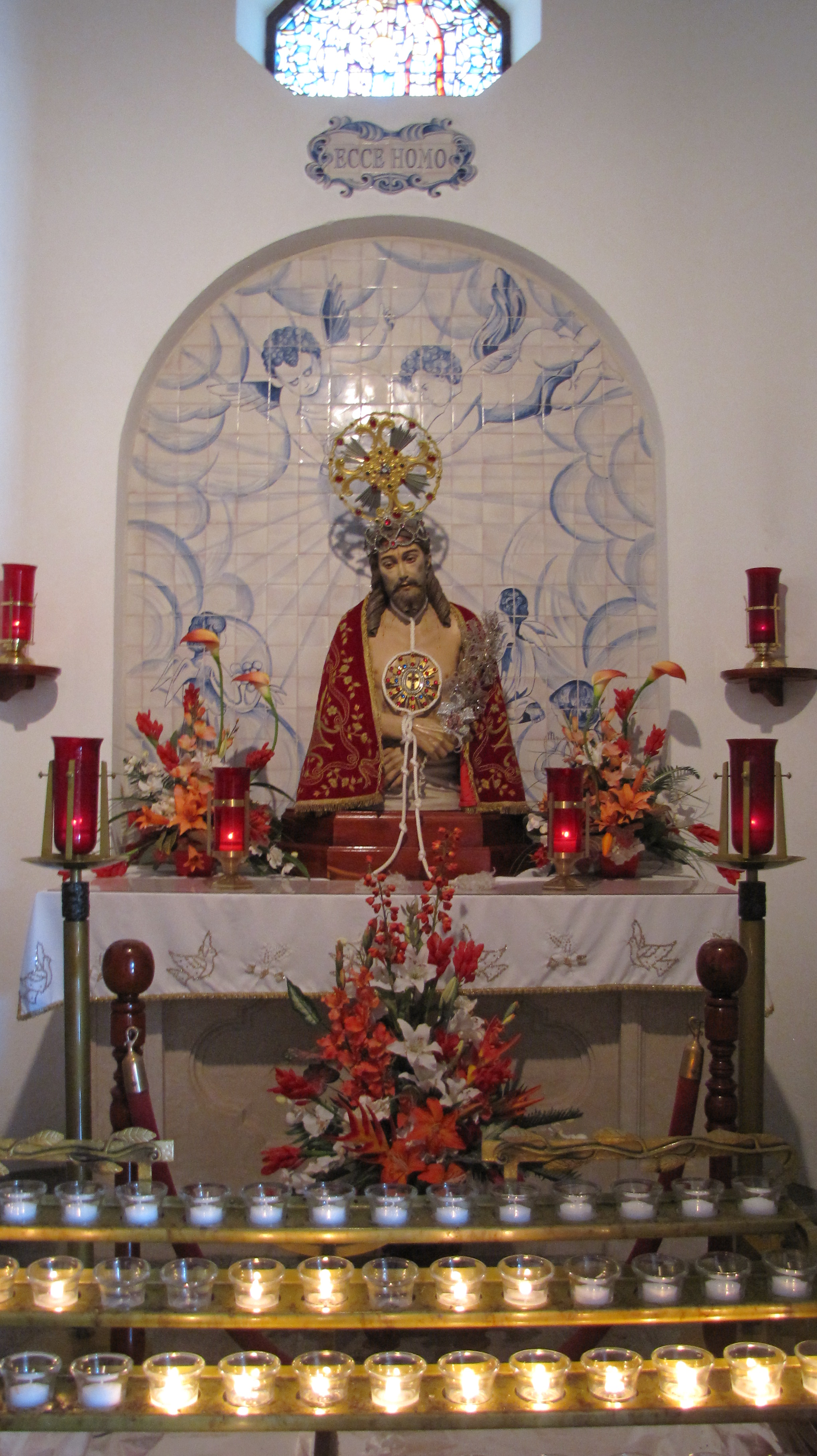
The image of the Lord Holy Christ of the Miracles in Hamilton, Bermuda islands.

Due to the emigration of many Azoreans to the United States and Canada, particularly coming from the São Miguel island, the worship and devotion to Senhor Santo Cristo dos Milagres was expanded and became by holding celebrations and processions in some cities in the Americas. Examples are the cities of Montreal, Brampton, Cambridge, London, Kingston, Winnipeg in the province of Manitoba and Leamington in the province of Ontario, Canada, as well as in the capital itself, in Toronto; and the cities of Fall River and Cambridge, Massachusetts, among others in the state of Rhode Island in the United States. In Fall River there was even a parish church built dedicated to the Holy Christ.

In the city of Hamilton, on the Bermuda islands, is also held a solemn procession in honor of the Holy Christ of Miracles.

== See also ==
- Santo Christo Church (Fall River, Massachusetts)
