= Ambrose J. Murphy =

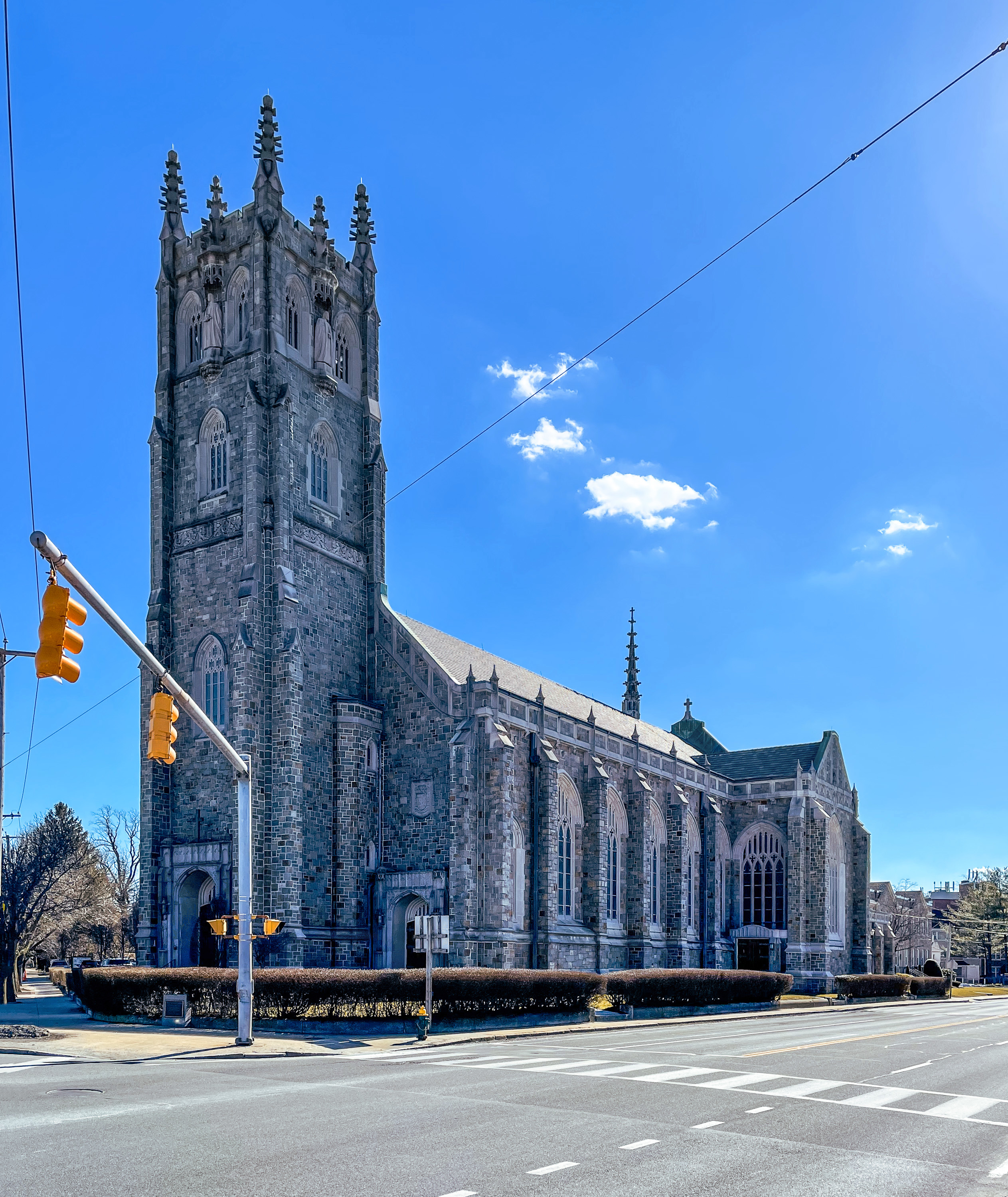
- Saint Paul Church, Cranston, Rhode Island
- Born: July 12, 1869; Worcester, Massachusetts
- Died: May 27, 1949 (aged 79); Providence, Rhode Island
- Known for: Architect, partner in Murphy and Hindle, Murphy, Hindle and Wright and Ambrose J. Murphy

Ambrose J. Murphy (1869–1949) was an American architect whose practice was based in Providence Rhode Island. He was a specialist in ecclesiastical work and, in a career that spanned over 40 years, designed many buildings for the Roman Catholic Diocese of Providence Rhode Island and Fall River Massachusetts.

== Early life and career ==
Murphy was born July 12, 1869, in Worcester, Massachusetts, where he likely was educated. He began his architectural career with his uncle James Murphy (1834–1907), an ecclesiastical architect in Providence, Rhode Island. After this he worked briefly as a draughtsman for Martin & Hall.

== Architectural practice ==
In 1900 he entered into a partnership with Franklin R. Hindle to form the firm Murphy & Hindle. Benjamin W. Wright joined the firm, now known as Murphy, Hindle & Wright, in 1907. The firm was dissolved in 1917 after which Murphy continued to work under his own name.

In 1918 Murphy began working with Samuel M. Morino, who continued with him and eventually inherited the office after Murphy retired in 1942. Murphy died on May 27, 1949.

== Legacy ==
Ambrose Murphy began his career at roughly the same time that Charles Maginnis of Boston, Massachusetts, was beginning his. Murphy may have been influenced by Maginnis's beliefs. His ecclesiastical buildings are said to be admired locally and some are on National Registers.

== Works ==
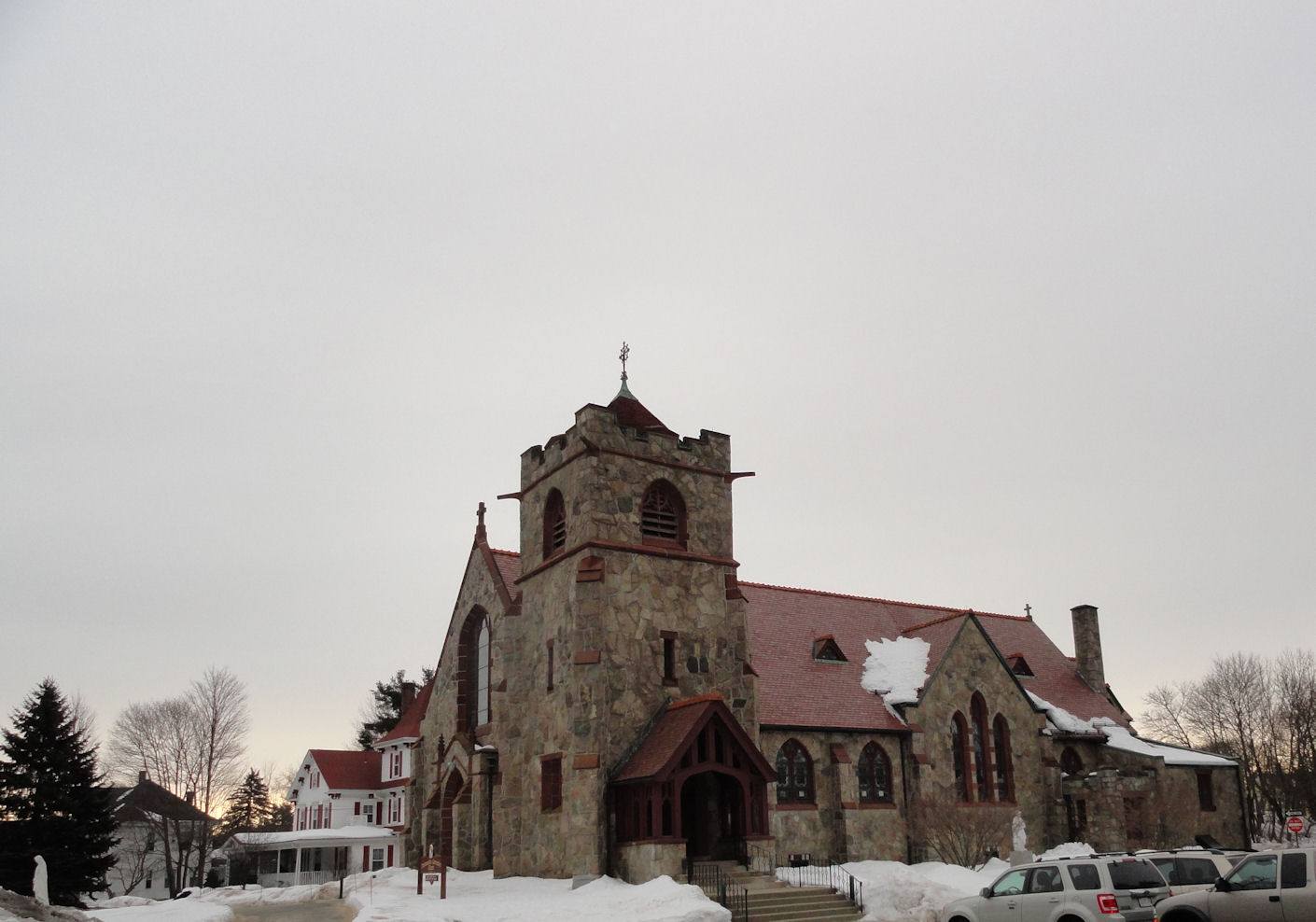
Immaculate Conception Church, North Easton, Massachusetts (1905)

=== with James Murphy ===
- 1896–1900 Holy Name of Jesus Church, Providence, Rhode Island

=== Murphy and Hindle ===
- 1900 St. Anthony Church, Providence, Rhode Island
- 1900 St. Andrew Summer Church, Block Island, Rhode Island
- 1903 St. Agnes Church, Providence, Rhode Island
- 1905 Our Lady of Lourdes Church, Providence, Rhode Island
- 1905 Immaculate Conception Church, North Easton, Massachusetts
- 1905 St. Thomas Moore Church, Narragansett, Rhode Island
- 1906 Our Lady of the Rosary Church, Providence, Rhode Island
- 1907 St. Ann Church, Cranston, Rhode Island (St Ann's Parish closed in 2013; church is now St George Maronite Catholic Church. http://www.stgeorgemaronitecatholicchurch.com/ )
- 1908 Immaculate Conception Church, Providence, Rhode Island (The church and the entire surrounding neighborhood were demolished for "Urban Renewal" circa late 1950s.)
- St. Patrick Church, Providence Rhode Island (demolished, 1980, due to structural problems)

=== Murphy, Hindle and Wright ===
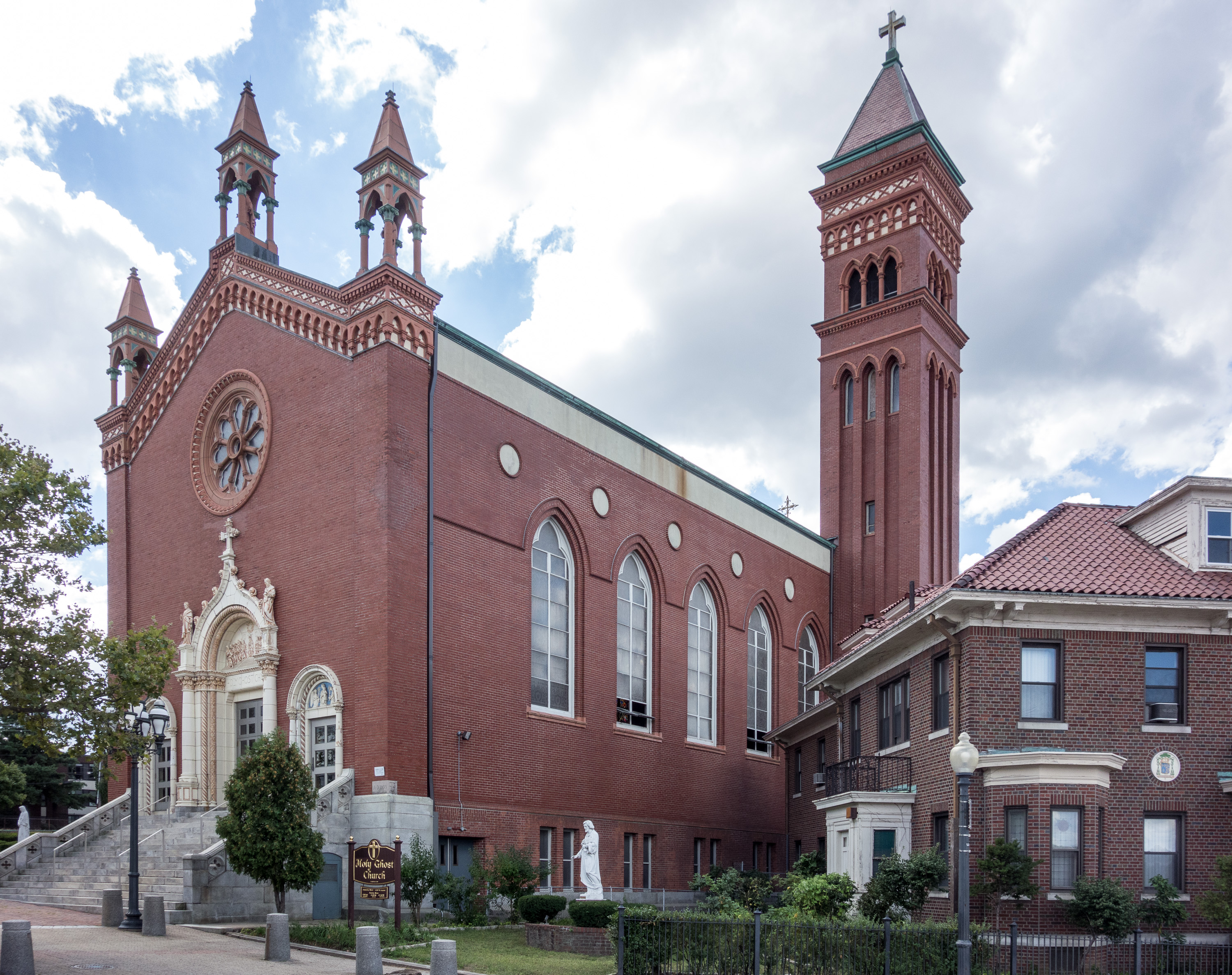
Holy Ghost Church, 472 Atwells Ave, Providence, RI

- 1908 Holy Ghost Church, Providence, Rhode Island
- 1909 St. Ann Church, Providence, Rhode Island
- 1912 Assumption Church, Providence, Rhode Island
- 1914 St. Rita Church, Warwick, Rhode Island
- 1901-1915 St. Michael Church (The current building replaced the second church built in 1868, and designed by his uncle James Murphy. In 1906, services were moved from the old church into the much larger basement chapel of the new church while the Upper Church was being completed. The Upper Church was dedicated on October 3, 1915.) The parish complex is on the National Register of Historic Places.

=== Ambrose J. Murphy ===
- 1916 St. Sebastian Church, Providence, Rhode Island
- 1919 Our Lady of Mt. Carmel Church, Bristol, Rhode Island
- 1924 Our Lady of Consolation Church, Pawtucket, Rhode Island
- 1924 Santo Christo Church, Fall River, Massachusetts
- 1925 Our Lady of Lourdes Church, Providence, Rhode Island
- 1927 St. Anthony Church, Woonsocket, Rhode Island
- 1928 Jesus Savior Church, Newport, Rhode Island
- 1930 St. Paul Church, Edgewood, Cranston, Rhode Island (with Samuel Morino, supervising architect)
- 1931 St. Matthew Church, Cranston, Rhode Island
- 1933 St. Alexander Church, Warren, Rhode Island (basement only, superstructure built by Joseph M. Mosher)
- 1935 St. Mary Church, Cranston, Rhode Island
- 1937 St. Patrick Church, Harrisville, Burrillville, Rhode Island
- 1939 Our Lady of Grace Church, Johnston, Rhode Island (Basement church, new upper church built late 1960s)
- 1942 St. Mary Star of the Sea Church, Narragansett, Rhode Island
