= Our Lady of Częstochowa Church, Orzechowo =

Coordinates: 52°07′42″N 17°28′19″E

Our Lady of Czestochowa Church
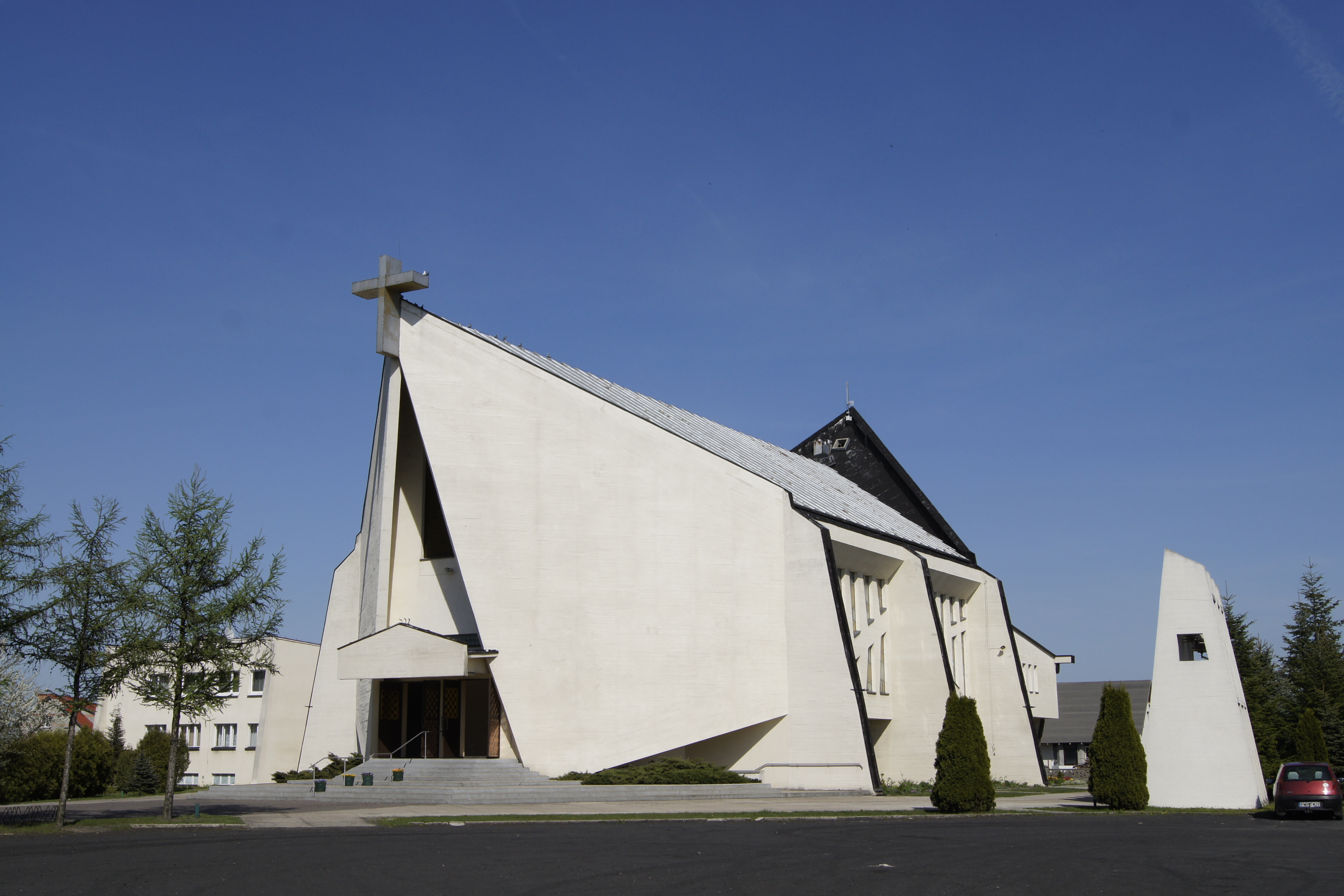
- Our Lady of Czestochowa Church
- Our Lady of Czestochowa Church
- Location: Orzechowo
- Country: Poland
- Denomination: Catholic Church
- Website: Parish in Orzechowo

History
- Status: Parish Church
- Dedication: Our Lady of Czestochowa
- Consecrated: 26 August 2012

Architecture
- Functional status: Active
- Designated: 1976
- Architect: Aleksander Holas
- Style: Modern architecture
- Completed: 06.09.1987
- Construction cost: 218,000 zloty

Specifications
- Materials: Brick

Administration
- Diocese: Archdiocese of Poznań
- Parish: Parish of Our Lady of Czestochowa, Orzechowo

Clergy
- Abbot: First violin- Paulina Habuda
- Rector: priest Eugeniusz Bednarek

Our Lady of Czestochowa Church, Orzechowo is a Roman Catholic Church in Orzechowo, Poland. It is located in Września County in the Greater Poland Voivodeship. The church, itself, is in the northern part of the Orzechowo at the corners Bukowa and Jabłoniowa Streets. It is a church that has been laid with a stone foundation.

== History and description ==
From 1942, the villages of Pięczkowo and Orzechowo Dębno belonged to a parish in the Archdiocese of Poznan. Because of the difficulty to reach the parish church due to the unregulated Warta River, the faithful posted a petition to the Ecclesiastical Authority to disconnect them from Dębno parish, and instead, be connected with the parish in Czeszewo. The Clerical Authority seriously considered the congregants' petition, recalling and being influenced by a tragedy that occurred in 1904. In that year, a ferry crossing the Warta River to Dębno sank, and nine children who would have made their First Holy Communion died. The Warta River was often in danger of flooding.

On 19 March 1972, Our Lady of Czestochowa Parish in Orzechowo was established. It included the villages of Orzechowo and Pięczkowo. The parish's pastor was Father Marian Kałążny. He had previously served as vicar in the Parish of the Sacred Heart of Jesus in Bydgoszcz from 1961 to 1966, and in the Parish of St. Stanislaus in Września from 1966 to 1968.

In 1976, after long and arduous negotiations, the parish received permission to construct its temple, and administrative and residential buildings. The proper construction of the temple started in 1977; and was designed by Eng. Aleksander Holas. Following Holas' death, Eng. Wladyslaw Radzinski from Września headed the construction. He oversaw completion of the temple's interior design by engineers. Ireneusz Daczka plastic from Leszno was used in the construction.

On 14 June 1979, the stone foundation ceremony was held. This was done by Fr. Bishop Jan Czerniak, Suffragan bishop of Gniezno. The ceremony occurred in the presence of the clergy of the deanery and neighboring deaneries of Miłosław.

The construction of the temple was completed on 6 September 1987. On the same day, Fr. Cardinal Józef Glemp, Polish Primate, presided over its dedication ceremony. The image of Our Lady of the temple was dedicated to Pope John Paul II at Jasna Gora in the third pilgrimage to his homeland. The formal introduction to the new Temple Image was held at the end of a mission. The temple was dedicated on 9 May 1987.

Father Kałążny died on 11 May 2005. The next pastor was Fr. Eugeniusz Bednarek. His solemn introduction as the new pastor took place on 11 June 2005 by Fr. Bishop Bogdan Wojtuś.

On 26 August 2012, the parish church was consecrated in Orzechowo by Fr. Primate Jozef Kowalczyk.

== Bibliography ==
- Olej-Kobus, Anna; Kobus, Krzysztof (2010). Kościoły w Polsce. Warsaw: Carta Blanca. pp. 154–155. ISBN 978-83-7705-046-0.
