= Our Lady of Lourdes Church Complex =

Historic church in Rhode Island, United States

- U.S. National Register of Historic Places
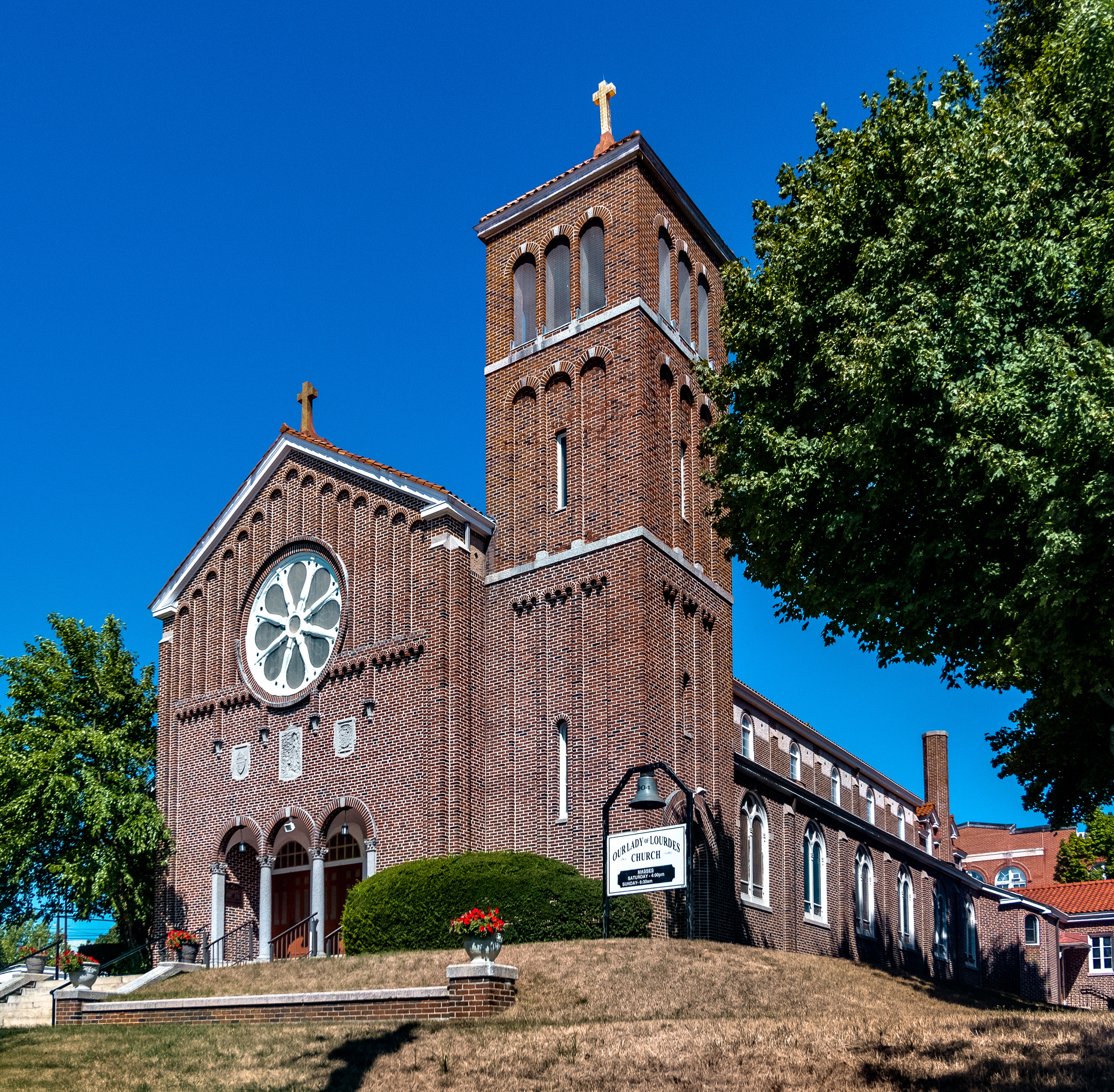
- Our Lady of Lourdes Church

- Location within Rhode Island Location within the United States
- Location: Providence, Rhode Island
- Coordinates: 41°49′32″N 71°26′52″W
- Area: 2 acres (0.81 ha)
- Built: 1905
- Architect: Murphy, Ambrose J. Fontaine, Walter
- Architectural style: Late 19th And 20th Century Revivals, Romanesque
- MPS: Providence MPS
- NRHP reference No.: 90000343
- Added to NRHP: March 15, 1990

Our Lady of Lourdes Church Complex is an historic Roman Catholic church complex at 901–903 Atwells Avenue in Providence, Rhode Island within the Diocese of Providence.

== Description ==
Our Lady of Lourdes consists of four buildings: a church, rectory, school, and convent. The church is a steel-frame structure clad in brick, designed by Ambrose Murphy and built in 1925. The rectory is a two-story brick structure with hip roof; it was built in 1912. The original rectory, built in 1905 to a design by Walter Fontaine, was converted for use as a convent when the new rectory was built. The school building, also built in 1905 to a Fontaine design, is the largest structure in the complex, and originally served as both school and church until the student population grew too large for the educational facilities. The complex was listed on the National Register of Historic Places in 1990.

== History ==
Our Lady of Lourdes was originally established for French Canadian immigrants to Rhode Island. There was often disputes between the French Canadian Catholics and Irish Catholics due to Our Lady of Lourdes operating in French opposed to English. In 1920, the parish decided to construct a new church. Architect and resident of the parish, Almanzor J. Samson offered to design the church. However, this was vetoed by the Bishop of Providence, William A. Hickey who instead selected the Irish-American architect Ambrose J. Murphy to design the church which was completed by 1928. Subsequent alterations involved adding French to the stained glass windows and stations of the cross in 1935.

The schoolhouse constructed in 1905 was run by nuns from the Order of Jesus & Mary. They asserted that all education, except religion, would be in English opposed to French. However, by the 1930s, French was the predominant language of instruction. This continued until the school closed in 1969.

== See also ==
- Catholic Church in the United States
- Catholic parish church
- Index of Catholic Church articles
- National Register of Historic Places listings in Providence, Rhode Island
- Pastoral care
