= Saint Paul Church (Cranston, Rhode Island) =

Coordinates: 41°46′34.01″N 71°24′03.00″W

St. Paul Church
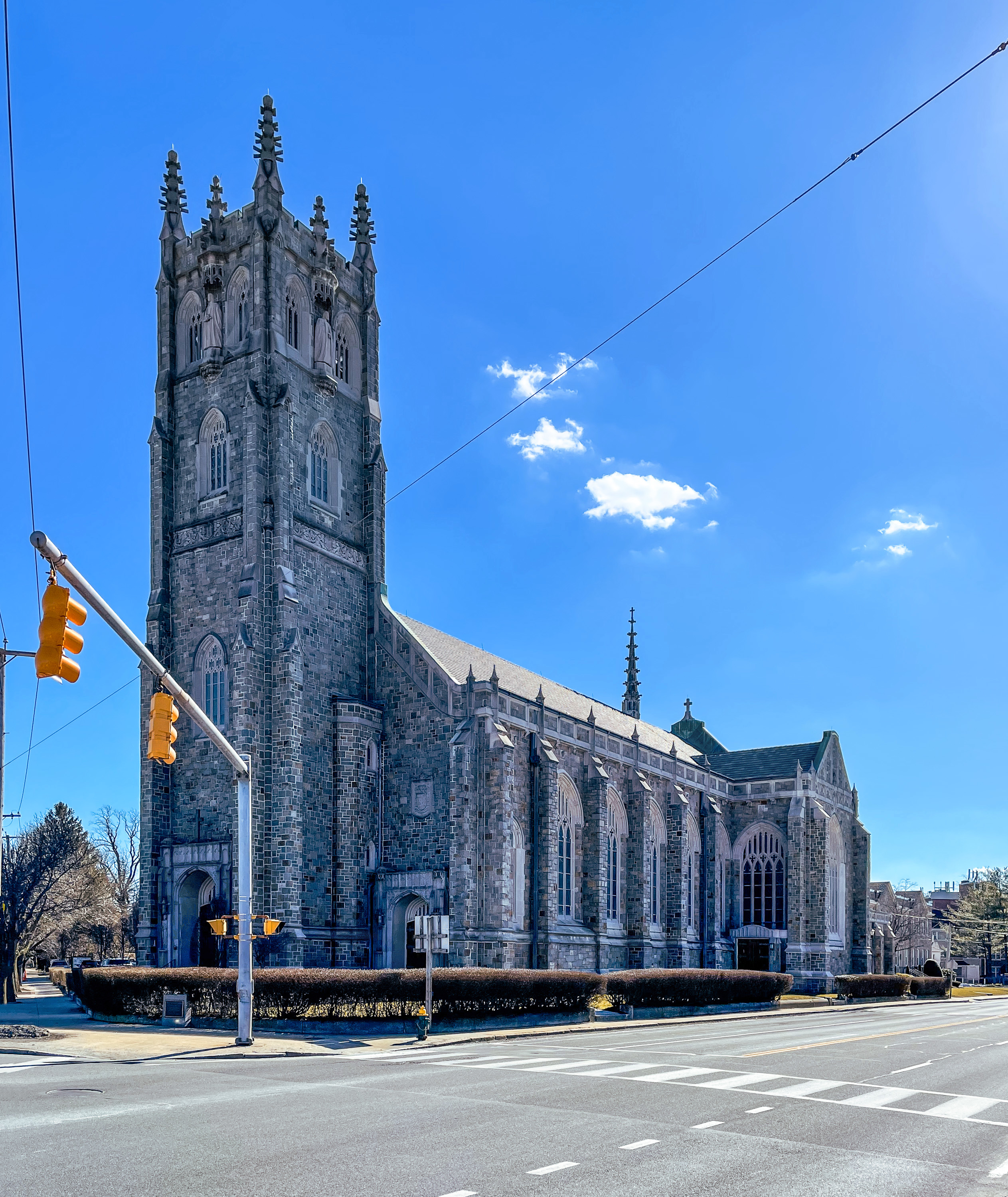
- St. Paul Church
- Location: 30 Warwick Avenue (1 St. Paul Place); Cranston, Rhode Island
- Country: United States
- Denomination: Catholic

Architecture
- Architect(s): Ambrose J. Murphy principal architect Samuel Morino supervising architect

Administration
- Province: Hartford
- Diocese: Providence

Clergy
- Bishop: Most Rev. Thomas J. Tobin
- Pastor: Rev. Thomas Woodhouse

Saint Paul Church, located in Cranston, Rhode Island, is a church and parish of the Diocese of Providence.

== History ==
Saint Paul Church was founded in 1907 in the Edgewood section of Cranston. The founding pastor, Father Michael McCabe, resolved that a permanent Church would not be built until a suitable school had been erected for the education of the children of the parish. The building of the school preceded the completion of the church for several years.

== Architecture ==
Saint Paul church was designed in the neo-Gothic style, begun in 1929, by the firm of ecclesiastical architect Ambrose J. Murphy, with Samuel M. Morino as chief architect. The design of the church was "hoped to be the equal of any church in the diocese of Providence."

The church's "crowning glory" is its stained-glass windows portraying scenes from the Bible and the lives of the Saints. The glass was designed by the firm of Earl Edward Sanborn of Boston, Massachusetts. In 2019, several of these historic windows were damaged by vandals throwing rocks.

== Services ==
In 2023, Saint Paul Church was served by Father Thomas J. Woodhouse, Paul Shea as Deacon Assistant, and Julie Bradley as Director of Faith Formation.

The church also offers service, education, and outreach programs for multiple age groups.

Each year, the church offers several adult retreats or nights of recollection.

== See also ==
- Catholic Church in the United States
- Index of Catholic Church articles
- Catholic parish church
- Pastoral care
- St. Paul's Church (disambiguation)
