= Our Lady of Czestochowa Parish, Coventry =

Coordinates: 41°41′43.9″N 71°32′13.8″W

Our Lady of Czestochowa Parish
- Our Lady of Czestochowa Parish
- Location: 445 Washington Street; Coventry, Rhode Island
- Country: United States
- Denomination: Roman Catholic

History
- Founded: 1905
- Founder: Polish immigrants
- Dedication: Our Lady of Czestochowa
- Dedicated: April 21, 1907

Administration
- Province: Hartford
- Diocese: Providence

Clergy
- Bishop(s): Most Rev. Thomas J. Tobin, D.D.
- Pastor: Jacek Ploch

Our Lady of Czestochowa Parish is a Catholic parish designated for Polish immigrants in Coventry, Rhode Island (Former Quidnick village), United States.

Founded in 1905, it is in the Diocese of Providence.

== See also ==
- Catholic Church in the United States

== Bibliography ==
- A brief parish history from the 1957 Jubilee Book; Our Lady of Czestochowa Parish - Quidnick RI. Quidnick, Rhode Island: the internet Polish Genealogical Source. 1957.
- Kruszka, Waclaw (1998). A History of the Poles in America to 1908; Part III: Poles in the Eastern and Southern States. Washington, D.C.: The Catholic University of America Press.
- The 150th Anniversary of Polish-American Pastoral Ministry. Webster, Massachusetts: St. Joseph Basilica. September 11, 2005.
