= Holy Trinity Parish (Lubin) =

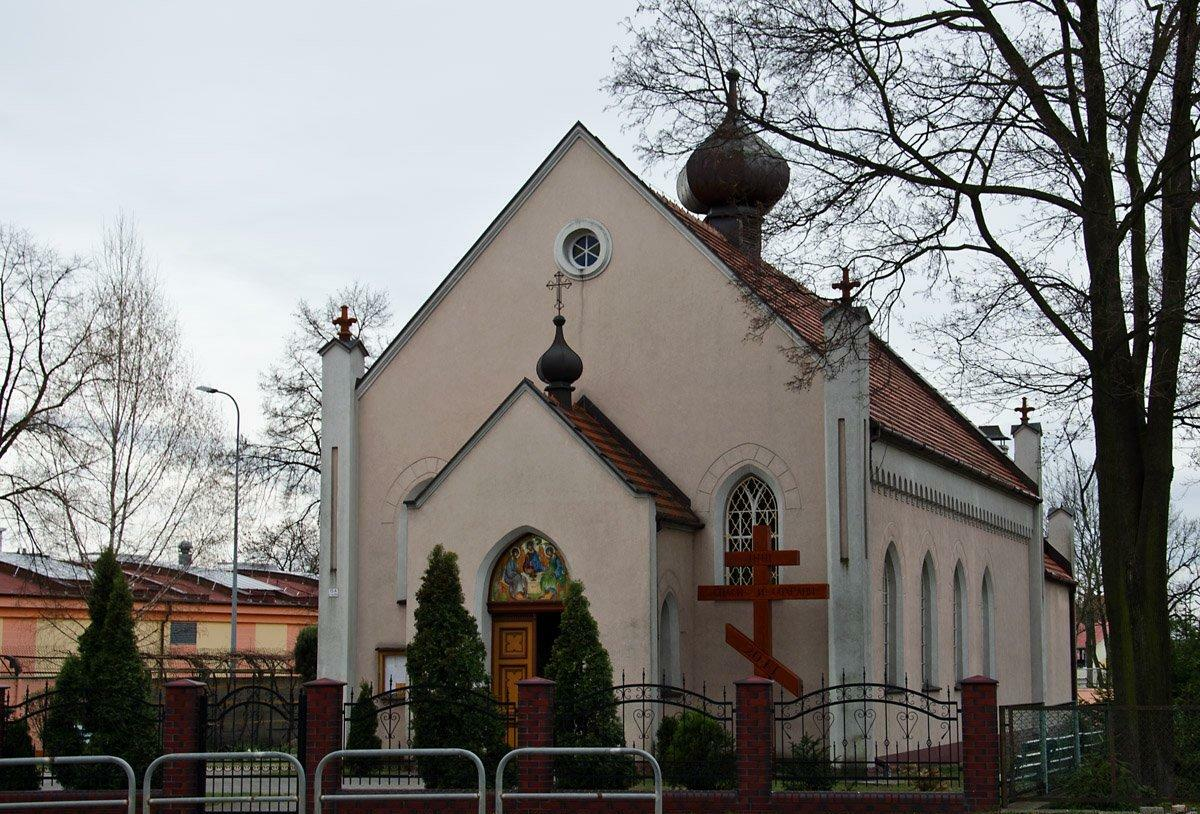
Holy Trinity Orthodox Church

The Holy Trinity Parish is an Orthodox parish in Lubin, Poland. The parish has a single Orthodox church, the Holy Trinity Orthodox Church in Lubin.

== History ==
The first Orthodox religious service in Lubin took place a few years after World War II, in 1949. The architect of the religious orthodox community was Father Jan Lewiarz from Zimna Woda.

The parish was erected on 9 January 1951, and was initially granted a devastated (in 60%) postevangelical (lutheran) church in the Old Lubin district. In 1952, thanks to the financial support of the metropolitan fundraising, the renovation of the church began. Unfortunately, lack of financial resources and no further support from the authorities made it impossible to complete the planned work.

An important event for the congregation was the visitation of bishop Stefan (Rudyk) on 3 June 1956.

Until 1958 the church in Lubin was a branch of the parish in Zimna Woda. The first pastor of the independent parish of the Holy Trinity was Father Michał Rydzanicz.

On 24 November 1959 the parish was given a building at 1 Maja Street, which had served as an evangelical (lutheran) chapel and later as a sports hall for the local female gymnasium; the temple in Old Lubin was taken over by the Roman Catholic Church. Adaptation of the building into an orthodox church required considerable financial investments and renovation works. After its completion, the temple was consecrated by Rev. Atanazy Slawinski.

Over the years the church underwent further renovations and construction works, the decor was enriched, including installation of an iconostasis, addition of a vestibule and a presbytery (altar). Since 30 January 2006, the function of the parish priest is held by Father Bogdan Repeła, M.A.

In 2013 the parish had about 350 members, living in Lubin and surrounding villages.

== List of parish priests ==
- 1951–1956 – Jan Lewiarz
- 1956–1960 – Michał Rydzanicz
- 1960–1962 – Jerzy Zilitynkiewicz
- 1962–1973 – Jan Rydzaj
- 1973–2006 – Michał Żuk
- od 2006 – Bogdan Repeła

== Literature ==
- Parafia Prawosławna Świętej Trójcy w Lubinie.
- Kalendarz Prawosławny 2018, Wydanie Warszawskiej Metropolii Prawosławnej, ISSN 1425-2171, p.208
- Hierarchia i kler kościoła prawosławnego w granicach II Rzeczypospolitej i Polski powojennej w XIX–XXI wieku, ks. Grzegorz Sosna i m. Antonina Troc-Sosna, Ryboły 2012
