= Michael Tierney (bishop) =

Irish-born prelate

Michael Tierney Most Reverend
- Bishop of Hartford
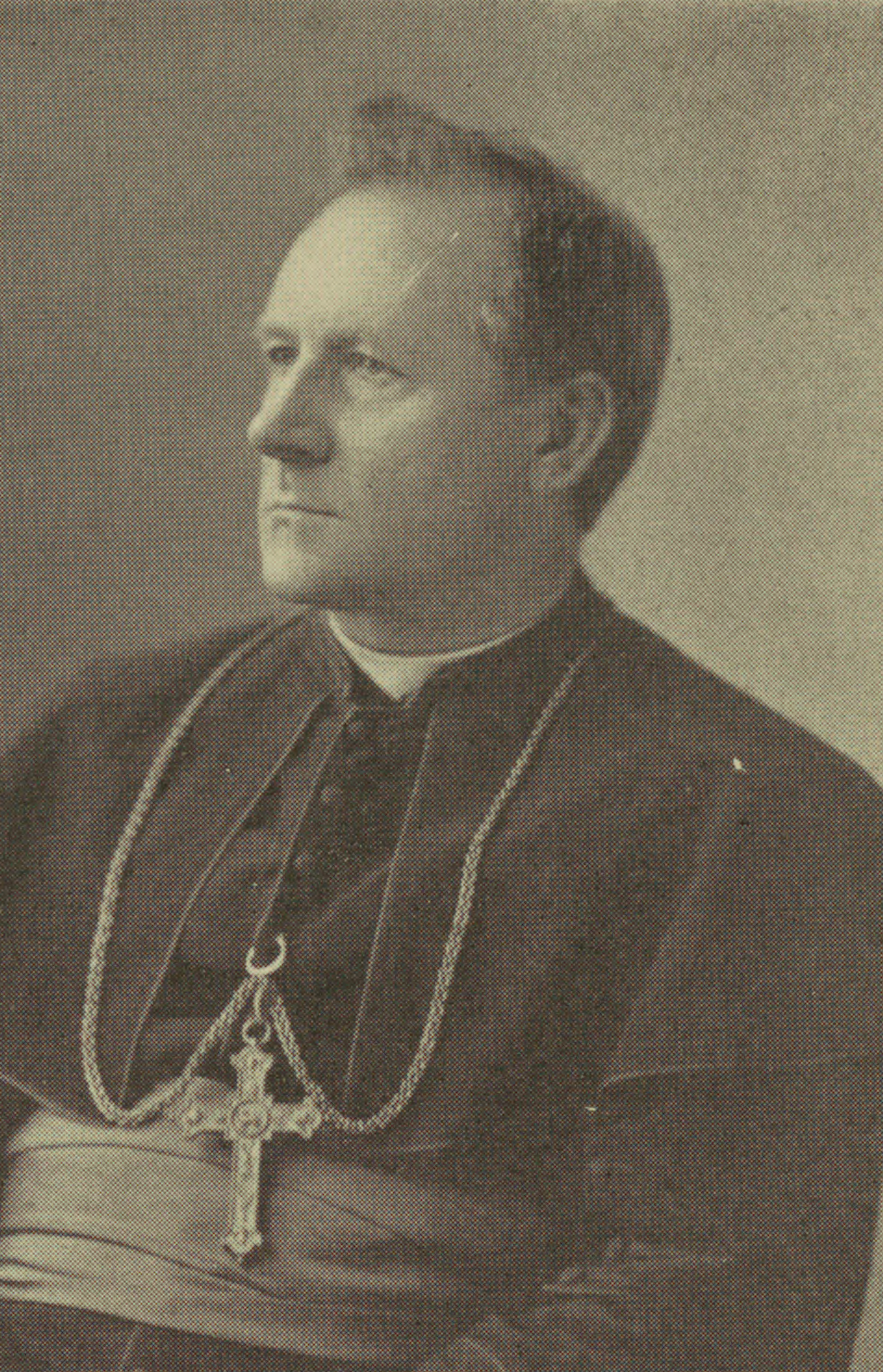
- Church: Catholic
- See: Hartford
- In office: February 22, 1894 – October 5, 1908
- Predecessor: Lawrence Stephen McMahon
- Successor: John Joseph Nilan

Orders
- Ordination: May 26, 1866 by John J. Conroy
- Consecration: February 22, 1894 by John Joseph Williams

Personal details
- Born: September 29, 1839 Ballylooby, County Tipperary, Ireland
- Died: October 5, 1908 (aged 69) Hartford, Connecticut, United States
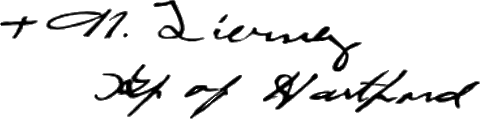
- Signature

Michael Tierney (September 29, 1839 – October 5, 1908) was an Irish-born American Catholic prelate who served as bishop of Hartford from 1894 until his death in 1908.

== Biography ==
=== Early life ===
Tierney was born on September 29, 1839, in Ballylooby, County Tipperary, in Ireland to John and Judith (née Fitzgerald) Tierney. After his father died in Ireland during the Great Famine, his mother brought the family to the United States, settling in South Norwalk, Connecticut.

Deciding to become a priest, Tierney entered St. Thomas Seminary in Bardstown, Kentucky. He then attended the Grand Séminaire de Montréal in Montreal in the British Province of Lower Canada. Tierney finished his formation as a priest at St. Joseph's Seminary in Troy, New York.

=== Priesthood ===
Tierney was ordained to the priesthood in Troy on May 26, 1866, by Bishop John Joseph Conroy for the Diocese of Hartford. At this time, the diocese included the states of Connecticut and Rhode Island.

After Tierney's ordination, Bishop Patrick McFarland named him chancellor of the diocese and rector of Cathedral of Saints Peter and Paul in Providence, Rhode Island. Tierney then served as pastor of St. Mary of the Star of the Sea Parish in New London, Connecticut. In 1872, the Vatican separated Rhode Island from the Diocese of Hartford, forming the Diocese of Providence. That same year, Tierney was transferred to Saint John the Evangelist Parish in Stamford, Connecticut.

In 1877, McFarland named Tierney as rector of St. Peter's Pro-Cathedral in Hartford in 1877. St. Peter's had been designated the pro-cathedral of the diocese, pending the construction of the first St. Joseph's Cathedral. As pastor, Tierney was responsible for the pastoral care of Catholic inmates at Wethersfield State Prison in Wethersfield, Connecticut, and parishioners at St. Lawrence O'Toole Chapel in Hartford.

McFarland also tasked Tierney with overseeing the construction of the cathedral. Tierney had extensive experience in building churches in his previous assignments. Bishop Thomas Galberry laid the cornerstone for the cathedral in 1877. In 1883, Tierney was appointed pastor of St. Mary's Parish in New Britain, Connecticut. Bishop Lawrence McMahon consecrated the first Cathedral of St. Joseph in 1892.

== Bishop ==
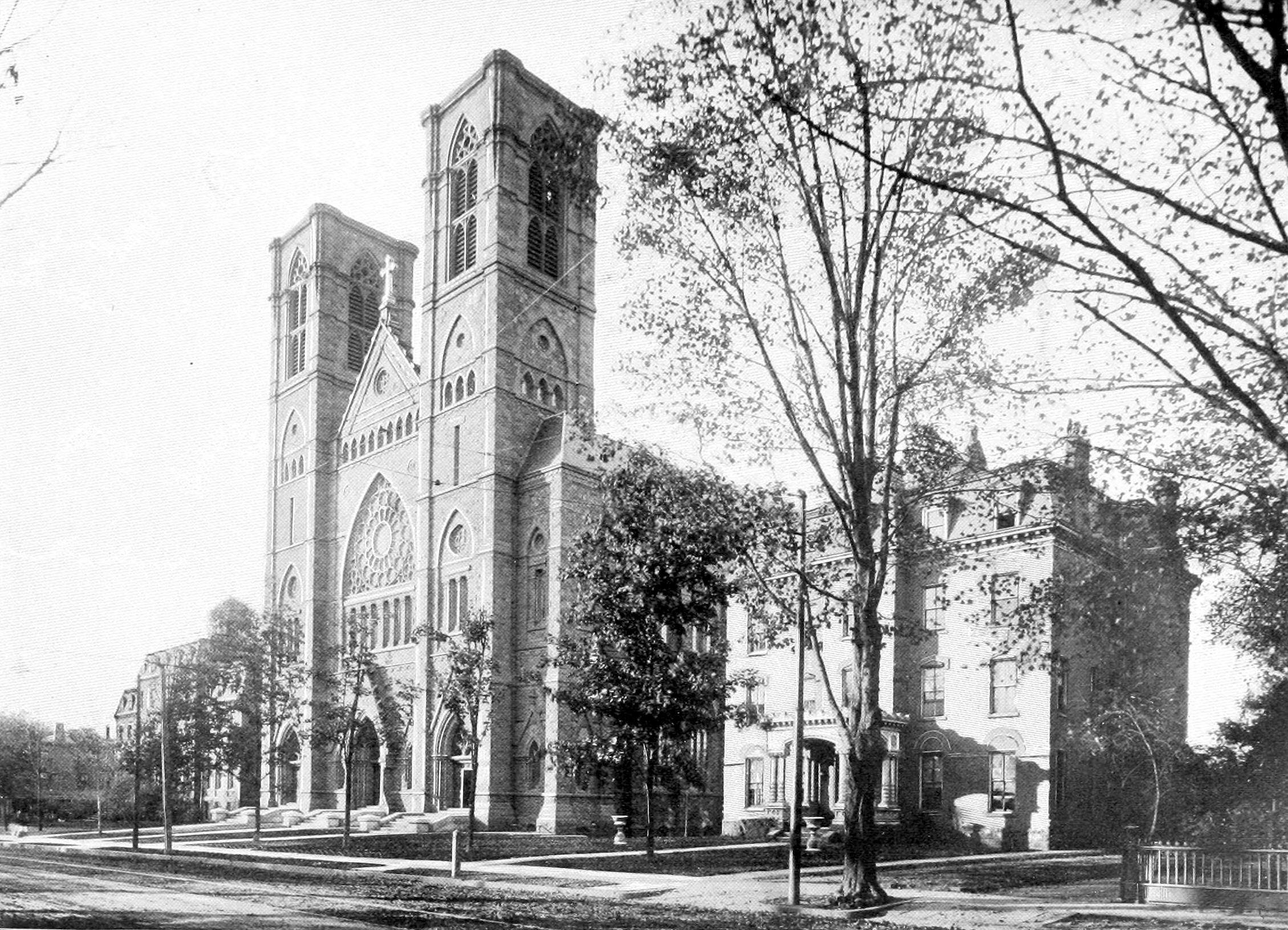
First Cathedral of St. Joseph, Hartford, Connecticut (1900) Destroyed by fire in 1956

On December 2, 1893, Tierney was appointed the sixth bishop of Hartford by Pope Leo XIII. He received his episcopal consecration on February 22, 1894, from Archbishop John Williams, with Bishops Matthew Harkins and Thomas Beaven serving as co-consecrators, at the first Cathedral of St. Joseph. One of Tierney's early acts was to send Reverend Tomasz Misicki to New Britain to assist the Polish community in establishing Sacred Heart Parish.

During his 14-year-long tenure, Tierney founded St. Thomas Seminary in Bloomfield, Connecticut; St. Mary's Home for the Aged; St. John's Industrial School; the hospitals at Hartford, New Haven, Bridgeport, Waterbury, and Willimantic; and numerous charitable institutions conducted by the Sisters of the Holy Ghost and the Little Sisters of the Poor. He also established a diocesan missionary band to preach retreats to Catholics and non-Catholics alike. At the time of his arrival in Hartford, there were 98 parishes, 204 priests, and 48 parochial schools; by the time of his death, there were 166 parishes, 300 priests, and 76 parochial schools.

=== Death and legacy ===
Tierney died on October 5, 1908, in Hartford, at age 69.

Catholic Church titles
Preceded by Lawrence Stephen McMahon	Bishop of Hartford; 1894–1908	Succeeded by John Joseph Nilan
