= Union Episcopal Church (Claremont, New Hampshire) =

Historic church in New Hampshire, United States

- English Church
- U.S. National Register of Historic Places
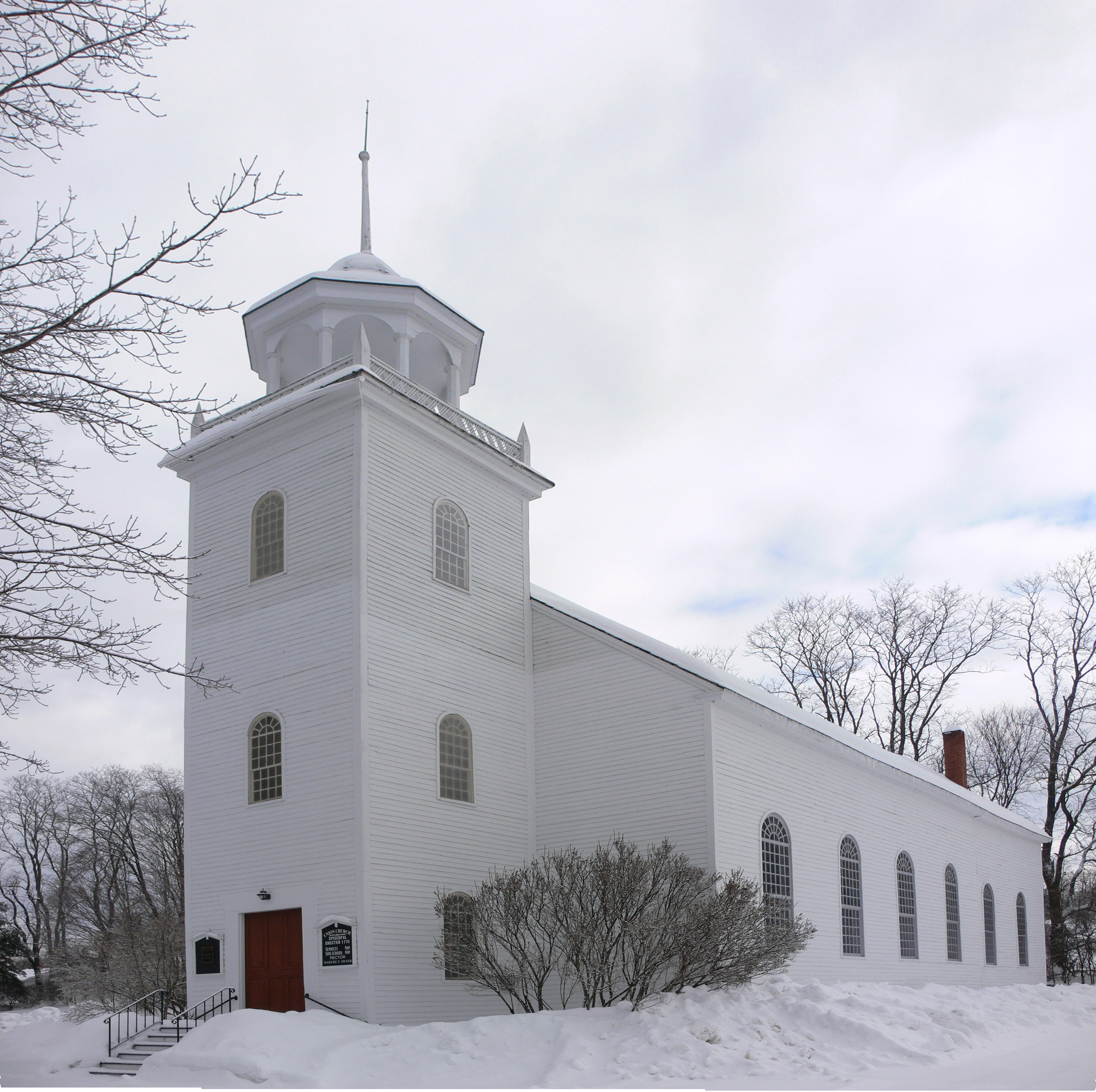

- Location within New Hampshire Location within the United States
- Location: 133 Old Church Road; Claremont, New Hampshire
- Coordinates: 43°23′02″N 72°22′17″W
- Area: 6 acres (2.4 ha)
- Built: 1773
- Architect: Rice, Ebenezer
- NRHP reference No.: 80000318
- Added to NRHP: February 1, 1980

Union Episcopal Church, also known as the English Church, is a historic church located on Old Church Road in Claremont, New Hampshire, in the United States. Built in 1773, it is the oldest surviving Episcopal church building in New Hampshire and is also the state's oldest surviving building built exclusively for religious purposes. It is an active parish in the Episcopal Diocese of New Hampshire. On February 1, 1980, it was added to the National Register of Historic Places.

The church reported 32 members in 2019 and 59 members in 2023; no membership statistics were reported in 2024 parochial reports. Plate and pledge income reported for the congregation in 2024 was $3,343 with average Sunday attendance (ASA) of nine persons.

== Early history ==
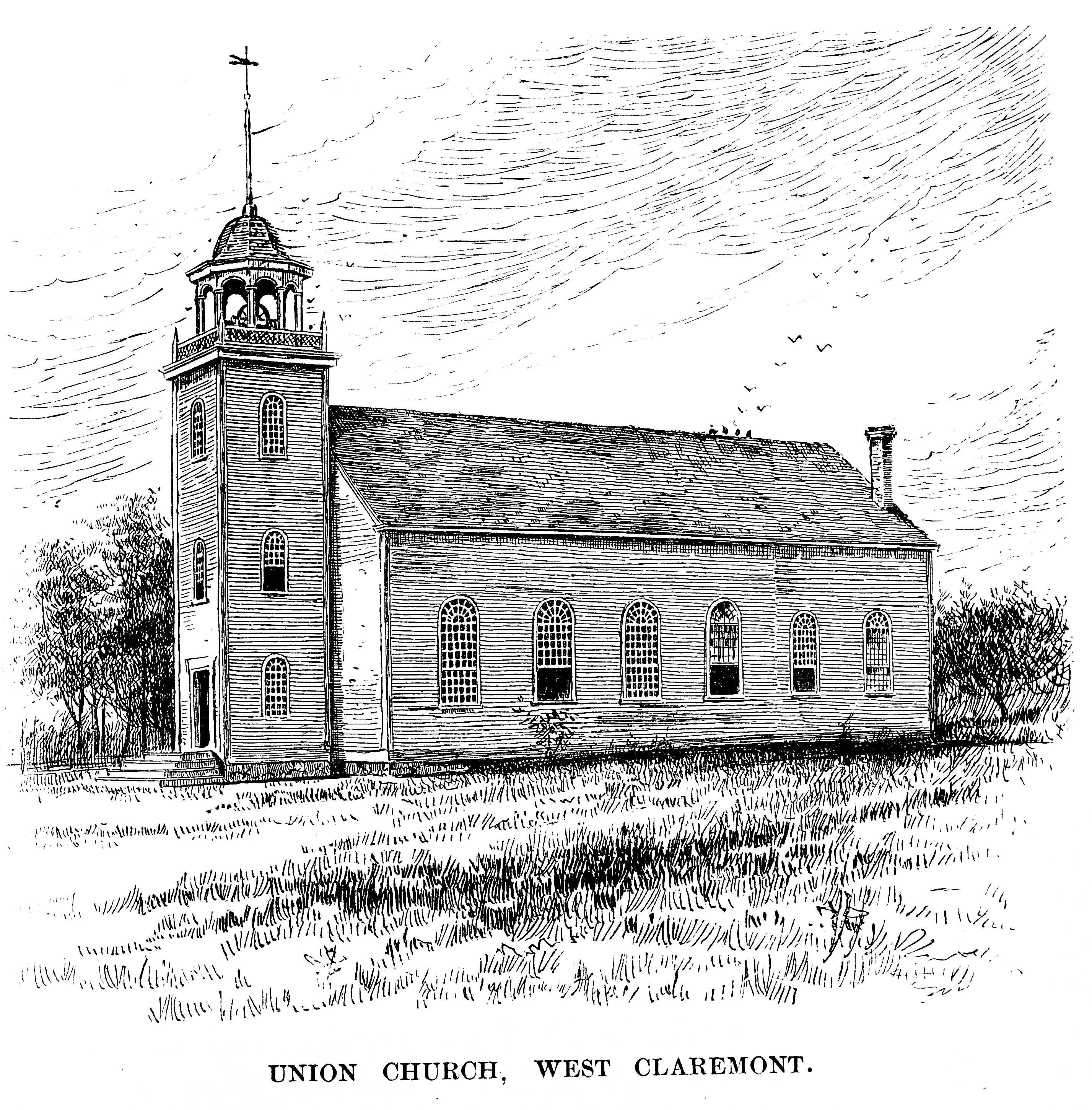
Engraving published in 1885

The parish was organized in 1771 and chartered by the New Hampshire legislature in 1794 as Union Church Parish. At that time local Episcopalians and Congregationalists were considering uniting to hire one minister to serve both groups, but this never happened. The next year the Rev. Daniel Barber, who had once been a Congregational minister, became Union's rector. His son, the Rev. Virgil Barber, also became an Episcopal priest, but left the church in 1816 to become a Jesuit priest and to later found St. Mary's Parish in Claremont, the first Roman Catholic church in New Hampshire.

When the church was built, it was a relatively modest structure despite its massive roof framing timbers. The tower was added in 1801, and the building was lengthened by some 25 feet (7.6 m) in 1820, at which time a pulpit and reading desk were added. These interior additions were removed in 1850 and replaced by the present altar configuration. The property also includes a relatively rare set of period horse sheds.

== See also ==
- National Register of Historic Places listings in Sullivan County, New Hampshire
- New Hampshire Historical Marker No. 57: Union Church
