= William Tyler (bishop) =

Right Rev. William Tyler
- Bishop of Hartford
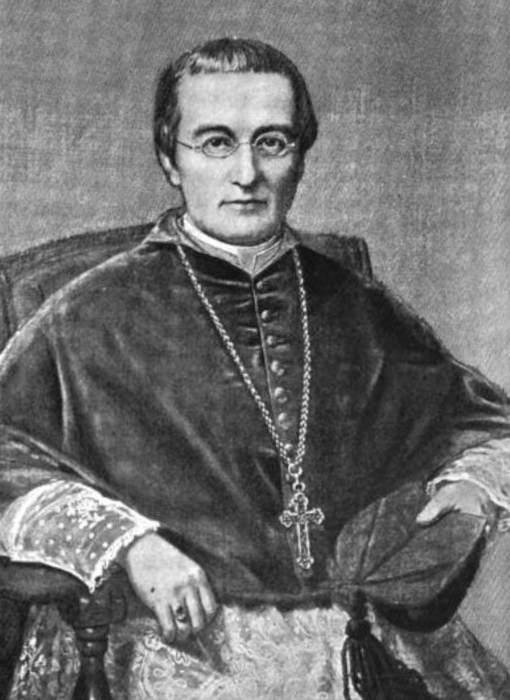
- Church: Roman Catholic Church
- See: Hartford
- In office: March 17, 1844 – June 18, 1849
- Predecessor: none
- Successor: Bernard O'Reilly

Orders
- Ordination: June 3, 1829
- Consecration: March 17, 1844

Personal details
- Born: June 5, 1806 Derby, Vermont
- Died: June 18, 1849 (aged 43) Providence, Rhode Island

William Tyler (June 5, 1806 – June 18, 1849) was an American Catholic prelate who served as the first bishop of Hartford from 1844 until his death in 1849. He is remembered for his efforts to assist the increasing population of Irish Catholic immigrants to the diocese and for his humility and dedication to service.

== Biography ==
=== Early life ===
One of eight children, William Tyler was born on June 5, 1806, in Derby, Vermont. His father, Noah Tyler, was a farmer. His mother, Abigail Barber was the sister of Reverend Daniel Barber, and aunt of Reverend Virgil Barber, both Episcopalian ministers who converted to Catholicism. The family moved to Claremont, New Hampshire, when William Tyler was a child.

Tyler had three brother; Israel, Ignatius and George. His four sisters joined the Sister of Charity of St. Vincent de Paul. Tyler converted to Catholicism at either age 15 or 16.

Deciding to become a priest, Tyler completed his classical training at an academy run by Virgil Barber in Claremont. Tyler in 1826 travelled to Boston, Massachusetts, to study theology and philosophy under Bishop Benedict Fenwick.

=== Priesthood ===
Tyler was ordained to the priesthood for the Diocese of Boston in Boston by Fenwick on June 3, 1829. At this time, the diocese included all six New England states. After his ordination, Tyler spent one year serving as a curate at Holy Cross Cathedral in Boston. Fenwick then sent him to work in a parish in Sandwich, Massachusetts. Tyler then went to Aroostook County in Northern Maine to perform missionary work. After his return to Boston, Fenwick appointed Tyler as vicar general of the diocese

=== Bishop of Hartford ===
In early 1843, during the Fifth Provincial Council of Baltimore, Fenwick asked the bishops to endorse the splitting of Rhode Island and Connecticut into a separate diocese from the Diocese of Boston to reduce his administrative workload. On November 28, 1843, Pope Gregory XVI erected the Diocese of Hartford and appointed Tyler as its first bishop. Tyler was reluctant to accept the appointment, but Fenwick persuaded him to take it. Tyler received his episcopal consecration on March 17, 1844, from Fenwick, with Bishops Richard Whelan and Andrew Byrne serving as co-consecrators, at Assumption Cathedral in Baltimore, Maryland.

At this time, the new Diocese of Hartford included all of Connecticut and Rhode Island. The total Catholic population of the diocese was close to 10,000, but only 600 lived in the Hartford area. Since 2,000 Catholics were living in Providence, Rhode Island, Tyler decided to move the episcopal see there. He designated the first Sts. Peter and Paul Church in that city as his cathedral. At the time of Tyler's consecration, the diocese had only six priests.

One of Tyler's first acts was to solicit financial assistance for the diocese from the Society for the Propagation of the Faith in Lyon, France, and the Leopoldine Society in Austria. Their aid allowed him to prepare two seminarians in Ireland and one in Massachusetts for future service in Hartford. Tyler would later recruit more priests from the new seminaries in the United States.

During the 1840s, the introduction of textile mills and other factories in Southern New England started drawing in large numbers of Irish Catholic immigrants. This was a poor population with few resources to support parishes. Concerned about the education of the children in these family, Tyler in 1847 invited religious sisters from the Confraternity of the Blessed Virgin Mary to open the first Catholic school in Providence.

As bishop in Providence, Tyler lived modestly. A friend remarked that any stable in the city was better than the episcopal residence, and that it "...could easily have been drawn by oxen from one end of Providence to the other". Tyler refused to use a carriage, insisted on walking everywhere. He distributed food to the needy every Monday at his residence. Tyler went out to visit the sick in their homes rather than delegating the job to his other priests.

Lacking a talent for public speaking, Tyler would carefully write out his homilies before mass. A non-drinker, he frequently preached the benefits of temperance, despite the irritation it caused some of his wealthier congregants.

With the establishment of mills and factories in Southern New England in the 1830s, more Catholic Irish and French-Canadian immigrants started arriving in Rhode Island and Connecticut. At that time, there were few seminaries in the United States that were graduating priests. Tyler recruited clergy from All Hallows College in Ireland to minister to these Catholics.

=== Death ===
Tyler's fragile health was further compromised after he contracted tuberculosis. In May 1849, Tyler attended the Seventh Provincial Council of Baltimore with the other American bishops. At that time, he sent a request to the Vatican for the appointment of a coadjutor bishop to assist him in the diocese. On the trip back to Providence, Tyler contracted rheumatic fever,

Tyler died in Providence on June 18, 1849, at age 45.The Tyler School in Providence was dedicated in August 1849 in Tyler's memory.

== See also ==
- Catholic Church hierarchy
- Catholic Church in the United States
- Historical list of the Catholic bishops of the United States
- List of Catholic bishops of the United States
- Lists of patriarchs, archbishops, and bishops

Catholic Church titles
Preceded by None	Bishop of Hartford; 1844–1849	Succeeded by Bernard O'Reilly
