= Daniel Barber (minister) =

Daniel Barber (October 1756 – 1834) was an American priest of the Episcopal Church priest who became a prominent convert to Catholicism.

== Life ==
Barber was born in Simsbury, Connecticut.

Barber served two terms as a soldier in the Continental Army. At thirty years old, he was ordained a minister of the Episcopal Church at Schenectady, New York. He married Chloe Case, daughter of Judge Owen of Simsbury, Connecticut, and about 1787, with his wife, his three sons, and a daughter, moved to Claremont, New Hampshire. He exercised the duties of the ministry at the Union Church for thirty years. The reading of a Catholic book opened up for him the issue of the validity of Anglican orders, by impugning Archbishop Parker's consecration. He visited for a conference Bishop Cheverus, then a priest in Boston. Cheverus answered his questions and gave him a number of books to read.

In 1807, at the instance of her parents, he baptized Fanny Allen, daughter of General Ethan Allen, who subsequently became a convert and died a nun in the convent of the Hotel-Dieu, Montreal. A visit he made there greatly impressed him, and Miss Allen's change of faith indirectly had much to do with his own conversion.

His son, Virgil Horace Barber, who was a minister in charge of an Episcopal academy at Fairfield, near Utica, New York, read John Milner's "End of Controversy" after a visit to Claremont. This visit resulted in the conversion of both husband and wife in 1817. The following year Virgil returned to Claremont from New York, taking with him Father Charles Ffrench, a Dominican who was officiating there at St. Peter's church. The priest remained a week in Daniel Barber's house preaching and saying Mass, with the result that he had seven converts, including Chloe Barber and her children, Mrs. Noah Tyler, who was Daniel Barber's sister, and her eldest daughter Rosetta. Mrs. Tyler was the mother of William Tyler, first Bishop of Hartford, Connecticut. Her husband and six other children were subsequently converted.

Daniel Barber's son and grandson, Vergil and Samuel, eventually entered the Jesuits. Vergil's wife Jerusha joined the Visitation order. Vergil and Jerusha's three daughters became Ursuline nuns.

Daniel Barber was not baptized with his wife, but on 15 November 1818, gave up his place as minister of the Episcopal parish of Claremont. Barber went to visit friends in Maryland and Washington, where he entered the Catholic Church. Chloe Barber died in her seventy-ninth year, 8 February 1825. Daniel spent the rest of his life, after the death of his wife, in Maryland and Pennsylvania, near his son Virgil. He died in 1834 at the house of the Society of Jesus at Saint Inigoes, Maryland.

== Works ==
Two pamphlets, printed at Washington, "Catholic Worship and Piety Explained and Recommended in Sundry Letters to a Very Dear Friend and Others" (1821), and "History of My Own Times", give details of his life and convictions.

In "History of My Own Times" (Washington, 1827) he states that his father and mother were Congregational Dissenters, of strict Puritan principles, and he continued in that sect until his twenty-seventh year, when he joined the Episcopalians.
