= Lawrence Stephen McMahon =

Canadian-born prelate

Most Reverend Lawrence Stephen McMahon
- Bishop of Hartford
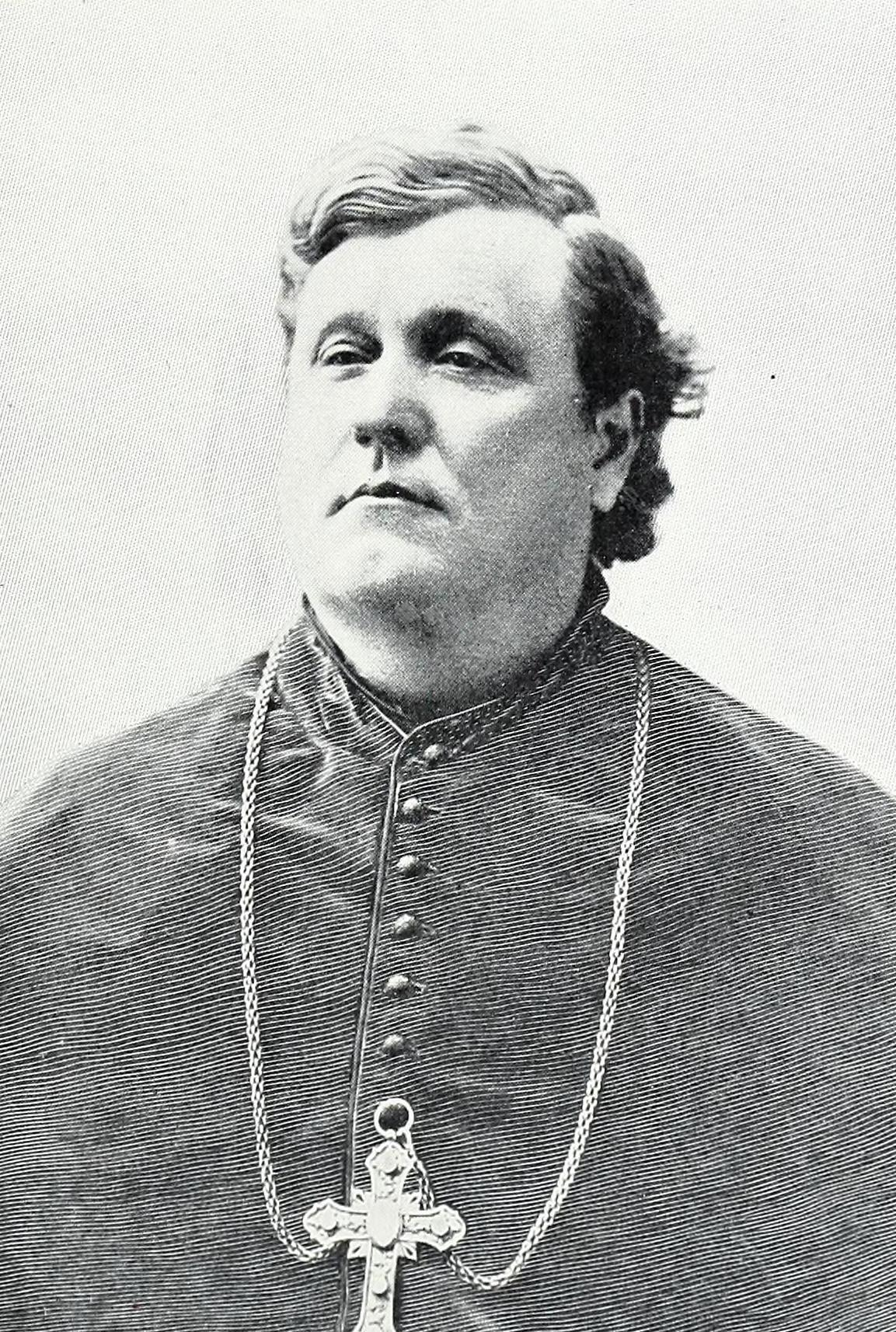
- Church: Catholic Church
- See: Hartford
- In office: August 10, 1879 – August 21, 1893
- Predecessor: Thomas Galberry, O.S.A.
- Successor: Michael Tierney

Orders
- Ordination: March 24, 1860 by Costantino Patrizi Naro
- Consecration: August 10, 1879 by John Joseph Williams

Personal details
- Born: December 26, 1835 St. John, New Brunswick, Canada
- Died: August 21, 1893 (aged 57) Lakeville, Connecticut, United States
- Education: College of the Holy Cross; Collège de Montréal; St. Mary's Seminary
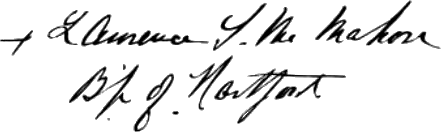
- Signature

Lawrence Stephen McMahon (December 26, 1835 – August 21, 1893) was a Canadian-born American Catholic prelate who served as bishop of Hartford from 1879 until his death in 1893.

== Biography ==
=== Early life ===
Lawrence McMahon was born on December 26, 1835, in Saint John in the British Province of New Brunswick to Owen and Sarah McMahon. In 1839, his family emigrated to the United States, settling in Charlestown, Massachusetts. His younger brother, John McMahon, joined the priesthood and later became pastor of St. Mary Parish in Charlestown

Lawrence McMahon attended public school in Boston for his primary education. At age 15, he entered the College of the Holy Cross in Worcester, Massachusetts. When Holy Cross closed in 1852 due to a fire, he traveled to the Collège de Montréal in Montreal in the British Province of Lower Canada to study rhetoric. He then entered St. Mary's Seminary in Baltimore, Maryland to study philosophy.

Bishop John Fitzpatrick of Boston had planned to send McMahon to Rome to study at the Pontifical Urban College for the Propagation of the Faith. However, the warfare in Italy due to the Italian unification movement made that trip impractical. McMahon instead went to the Seminary of Aix in France, where he studied theology for the next three years. He later went to reside at the Pontifical French Seminary in Rome while attending lectures at the Pontifical Lateran University.

=== Priesthood ===
McMahon was ordained to the priesthood for the Diocese of Boston in Rome on March 24, 1860, by Cardinal Costantino Patrizi Naro. After McMahon returned to Boston, the diocese assigned him as a curate at Holy Cross Cathedral in Boston.

In 1862, during the American Civil War, the 28th Massachusetts regiment, an Irish immigrant unit in the Union Army, contacted the archdiocese, asking them to assign a priest as their a chaplain. After all the other priests in the diocese turned down the army request, McMahon volunteered.

McMahon joined the regiment in South Carolina in June 1862. In July 1862, he accompanied them to Virginia. That year, he participated in the Second Battle of Bull Run, the Battle of Antietam and the Battle of Fredericksburg, all in Virginia. After the battles, McMahon would tend to the sick and dying in the Union camp. By the spring of 1863, McMahon had become disabled by an infectious disease and was sent to an army hospital in Washington D.C. The regiment discharged him in June 1863.

After his army discharge in 1863, the diocese appointed McMahon as pastor of a parish in Bridgewater, Massachusetts. He was later sent to St. Lawrence Parish in New Bedford, Massachusetts, which had a large number of French-Canadian and Portuguese immigrants. McMahon was conversant in French, but struggled in Portuguese. He recruited other priests who were fluent in those languages into the city. He also erected a new church and a hospital under the care of the Sisters of Mercy.

When the Vatican erected the Diocese of Providence in 1872, it included New Bedford along with several counties in Southeastern Massachusetts. McMahon was incardinated, or transferred, to the new diocese. Thomas Francis Hendricken, the first bishop of Providence, appointed McMahon as his vicar general.

=== Bishop of Hartford ===
On May 16, 1879, McMahon was appointed the fifth bishop of Hartford by Pope Leo XIII. He received his episcopal consecration on August 10, 1879, from Archbishop John Williams, with Bishops John Loughlin and Patrick O'Reilly serving as co-consecrators, at the first St. Joseph's Cathedral in Hartford.

After become bishop, McMahon soon liquidated the diocese's $60,000 debt. He also continued to execute the building plans of his predecessors for the first Cathedral of St. Joseph. He hired the architect, Patrick Keely, who had constructed many Catholic churches around the country, along with the sculptor Joseph Sibbel. McMahon dedicated the cathedral in May 1892.

During McMahon's 14-year tenure as bishop, many different ethnic groups started arriving in the diocese. Unlike some other American bishops, McMahon welcomed all of them; his only stipulation was that they behave as Catholics. McMahon established 48 parishes in the diocese These included national parishes for Italian, Slovak, Lithuanian and German immigrants. He also opened 16 parochial schools.

When confronted with criticism by French-Canadian nationalists, who were deeply suspicious of Irish clergy, he faced them in a public meeting. McMahon told the group that if they knew of any available French-Canadian priests, they should send them to him. He also told the group that he wanted their children to become priests,

That they are Canadian, Irish or German makes no difference to me...I am the father of all...send me your children...poor and intelligent...who have the disposition of the priesthood and I will take charge of their education.

After the meeting, his relations with the French-Canadian community improved. In 1992, McMahon consecrated the first Cathedral of St. Joseph.

=== Death and legacy ===
McMahon died on August 21, 1893, in Lakeville, Connecticut, at age 57. He was interred in the crypt in the first Cathedral of St. Joseph. After the cathedral was destroyed by fire in 1958, his remains were re-interred in the Bishop's Plot at Mount St. Benedict Cemetery in Bloomfield, Connecticut.

Catholic Church titles
Preceded by Thomas Galberry, O.S.A.	Bishop of Hartford; 1879—1893	Succeeded by Michael Tierney
