= St. Mary – St. Catherine of Siena Parish =

Roman Catholic parish in Charlestown, MA, United States

Coordinates: 42°22′25.22″N 71°03′41.94″W

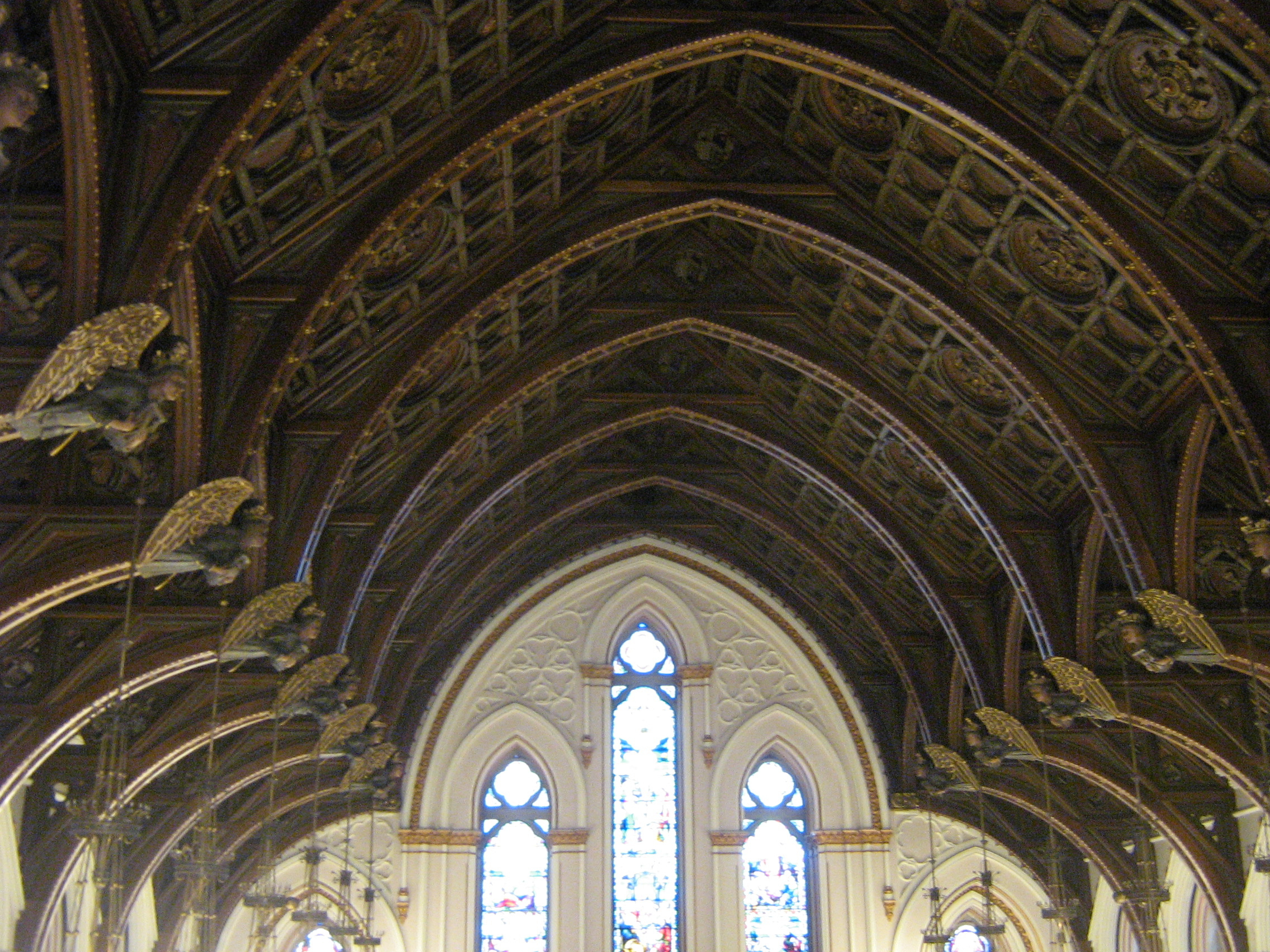
Hammerbeam ceiling at St. Mary's church building in Charlestown.

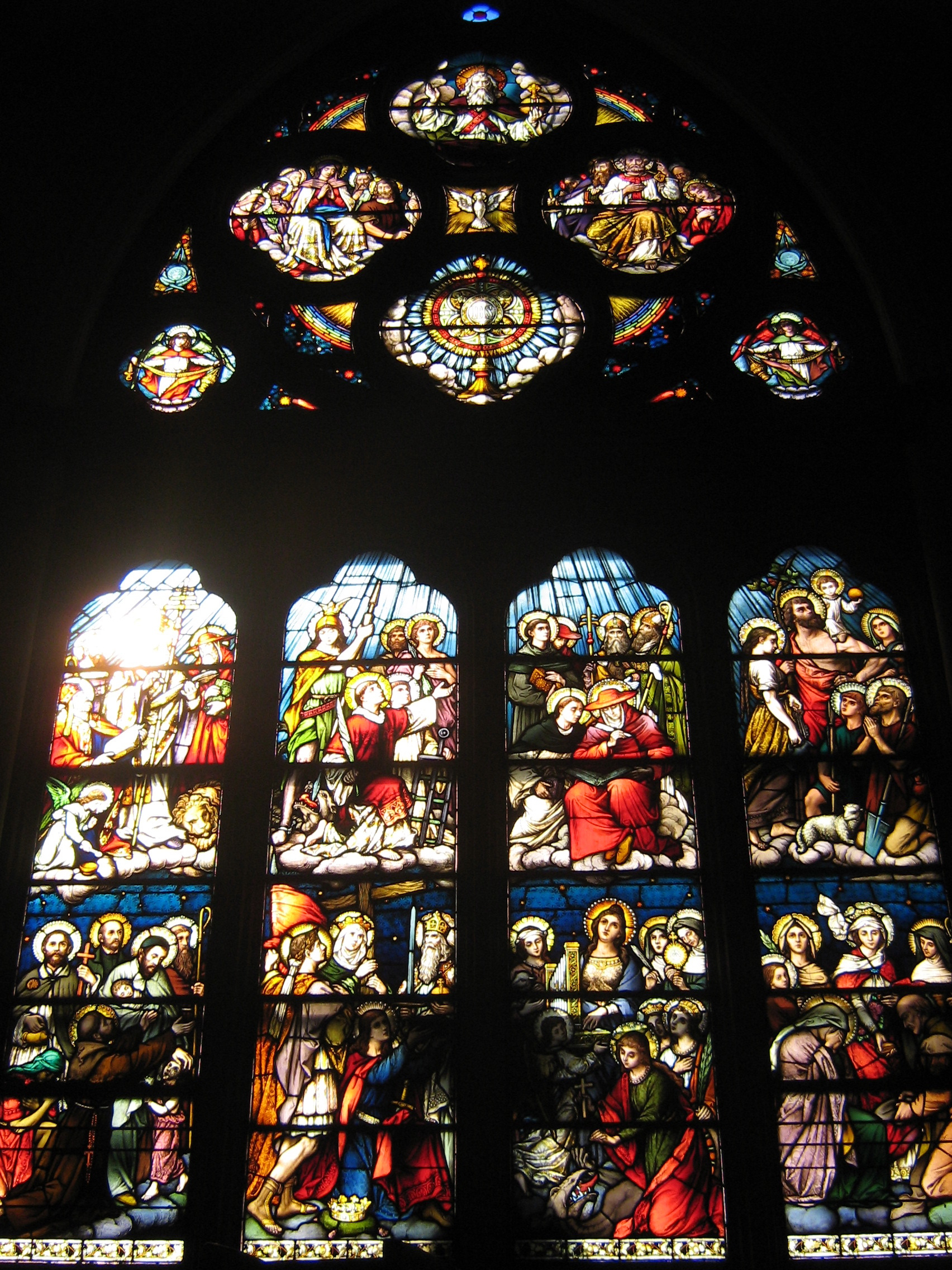
Stained glass window in choir gallery of St. Mary's church building, by Franz Mayer & Co.

St. Mary – St. Catherine of Siena is a historic Roman Catholic parish in Charlestown, Massachusetts. It resulted from the 2006 merger of two older parishes, St. Catherine of Siena on Vine St. and St. Mary's on Warren and Winthrop. The parish occupies the latter's building, which was one of the later masterpieces of Patrick Keely. Built between 1887 and 1893, its ornate interior boasts stained glass windows by Franz Mayer & Co. and a hammer-beam oak ceiling with angels, carved by Keely himself.

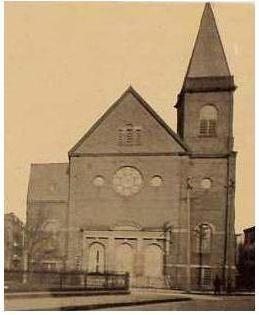
Vintage postcard of St. Catherine of Siena (c.1900).

The St. Catherine's building, a Romanesque design completed in 1895, was closed in 2008. Visually the brick building is a well-known landmark visible from the Tobin Bridge. Four of the stained glass windows from the shuttered church were installed in the Seaport Shrine.

== History ==
The original Parish of St. Mary's was established by Bishop Benedict Joseph Fenwick on Old Rutherford Avenue in 1828. In 1847, there was a revival of the anti-immigrant, anti-Catholic Know nothing sentiment and a mob gathered and stoned St. Mary's. With the arrival of more immigrants, hostility increased. In 1853, a young Irish woman named Hannah Corcoran had become a Baptist. Her mother and a Catholic priest took her to Philadelphia. Nativist pamphleteers alleged kidnapping and murder and there was widespread public disorder. A Charlestown mobbed, inflamed by the handbills, came very close to storming the house of pastor Patrick F. Lyndon.

Rev. William Byrne became pastor of St. Mary's in 1874; he became vicar general of the diocese in 1878 and served in both capacities until 1881 when he became president of Mount St. Mary College in Emmitsburg, Maryland.

Om October 29, 1887 pastor John McMahon laid the cornerstone for the new St. Mary's on Warren St. He was the younger brother of Bishop Lawrence Stephen McMahon of the Diocese of Hartford, who was at that time overseeing the completion of St. Joseph's Cathedral, designed by Patrick Keely. Father McMahon chose Keely to design the new St. Mary's. The Gothic exterior combines Rockport granite with brick trim. The altar was likely designed by Thomas F.Houghton, Keely's son-in-law and principal draftsman. The Stations of the Cross are by Joseph Sibbel and duplicate those he supplied for St. Joseph's in Hartford.

The first service was held May 26, 1889 in the basement; the sermon preached by Bishop McMahon of Hartford. On August 13, 1890 the funeral for poet John Boyle O'Reilly was held in the church with thousands in attendance.

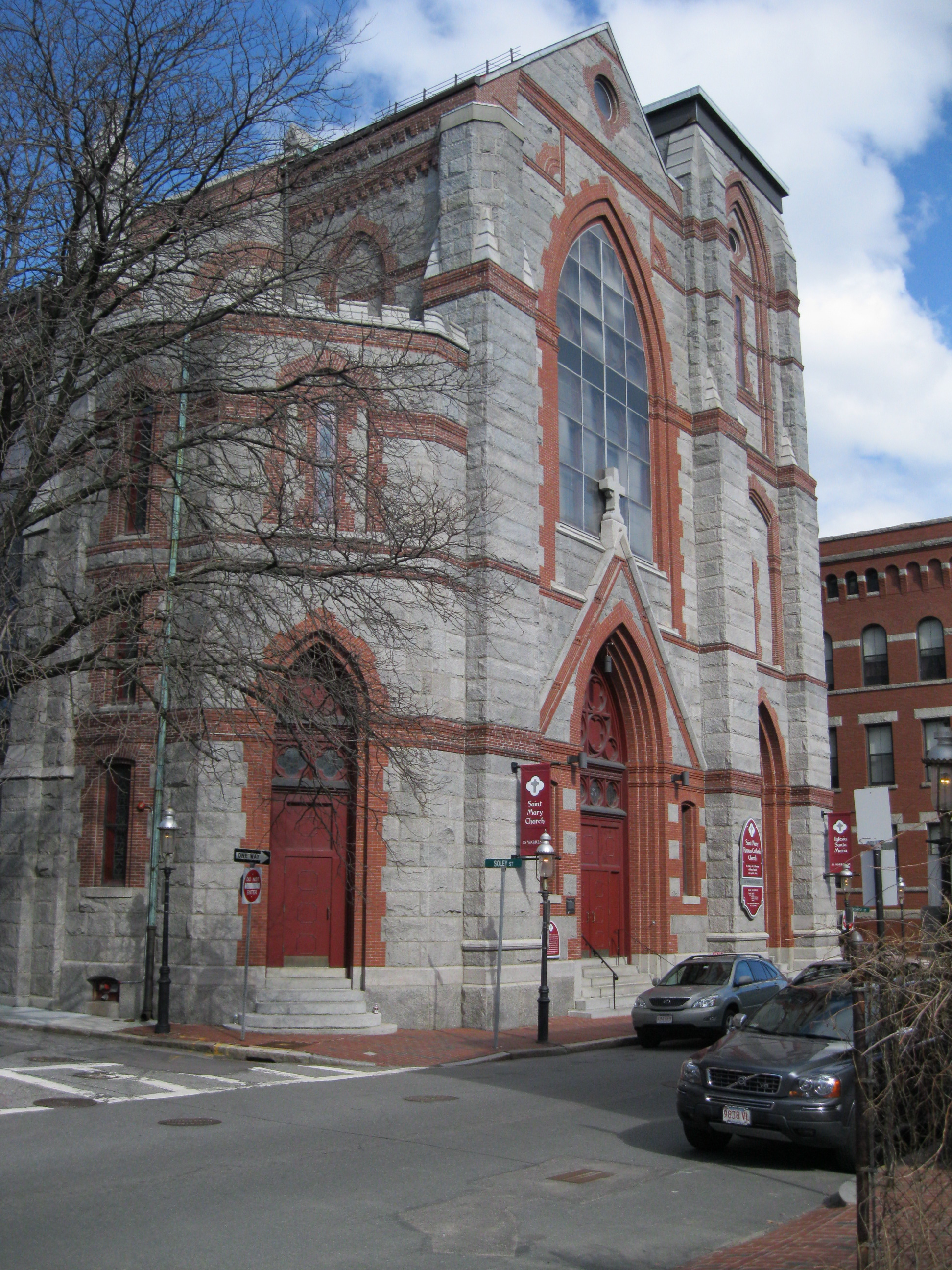
St. Mary's Church, Charlestown
