= Hammerbeam roof =

Type of English Gothic roof

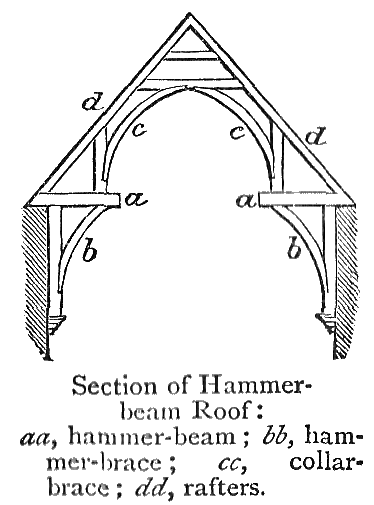
Illustration of a single hammer-beam truss. The collar-braces (c) join to the hammer posts on the bottom and collar beam on top. Chambers 1908

A hammerbeam roof is a decorative, open timber roof truss typical of English Gothic architecture and has been called "the most spectacular endeavour of the English Medieval carpenter". They are traditionally timber framed, using short beams projecting from the wall on which the rafters land, essentially a tie beam which has the middle cut out. These short beams are called hammer-beams and give this truss its name. A hammerbeam roof can have a single, double or false hammerbeam truss.

== Design ==
A hammer-beam is a form of timber roof truss, allowing a hammerbeam roof to span greater than the length of any individual piece of timber. In place of a normal tie beam spanning the entire width of the roof, short beams – the hammer beams – are supported by curved braces from the wall, and hammer posts or arch-braces are built on top to support the rafters and typically a collar beam. The hammerbeam truss exerts considerable thrust on the walls or posts that support it. Hammerbeam roofs can be highly decorated including ornamented pendants and corbels, with church roofs often including carved angels.

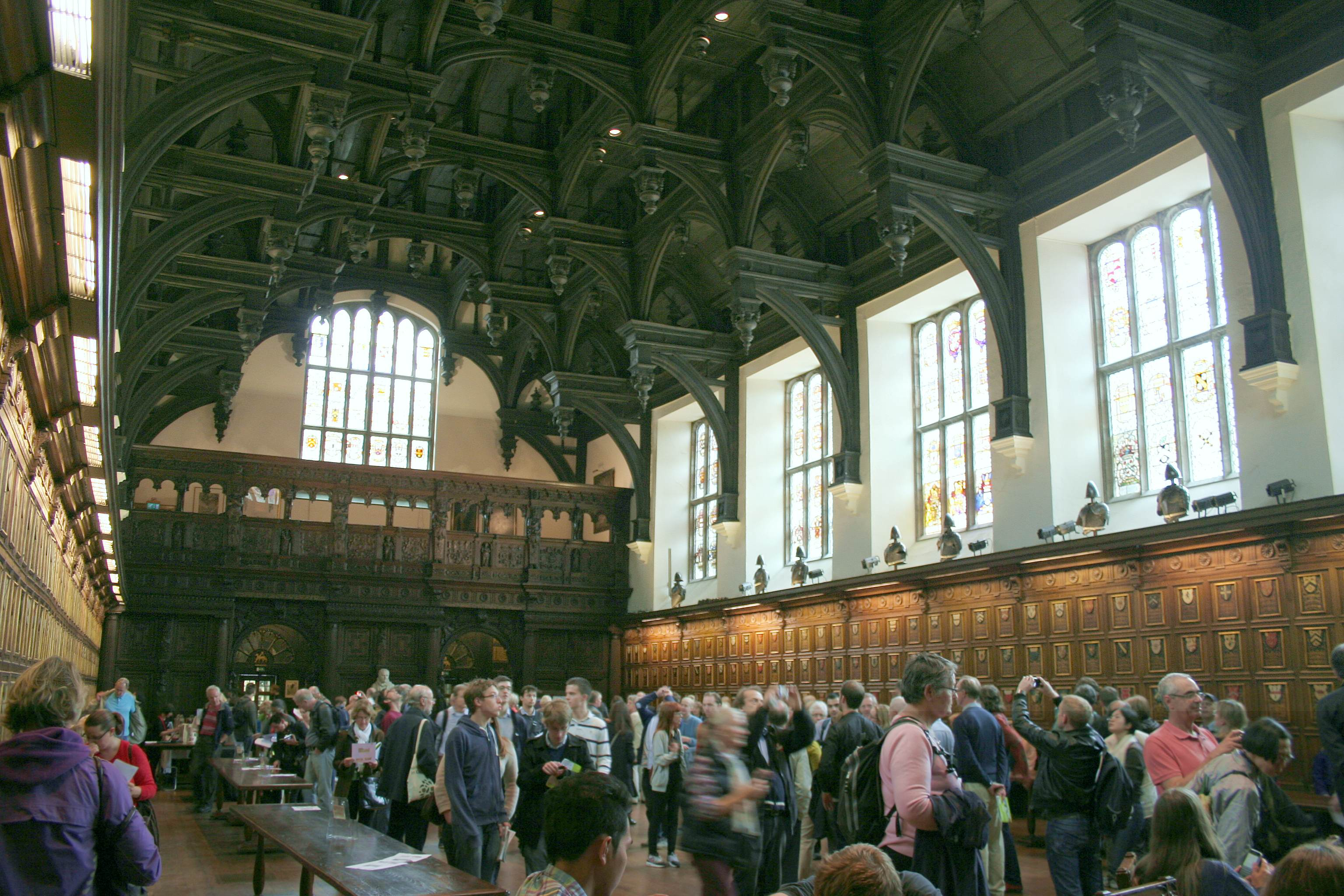
Interior of the Middle Temple hall in London, showing its double-hammerbeam roof

A roof with one pair of hammer beams is a single hammerbeam roof. Some roofs have a second pair of hammer beams and are called double hammerbeam roofs (truss).

A false hammerbeam roof (truss) has two definitions:

1. There is no hammer post on the hammer beam as sometimes found in a type of arch-brace truss; or
2. The hammer beam joins into the hammer post, instead of the hammer post landing on the hammer beam.

== Examples ==
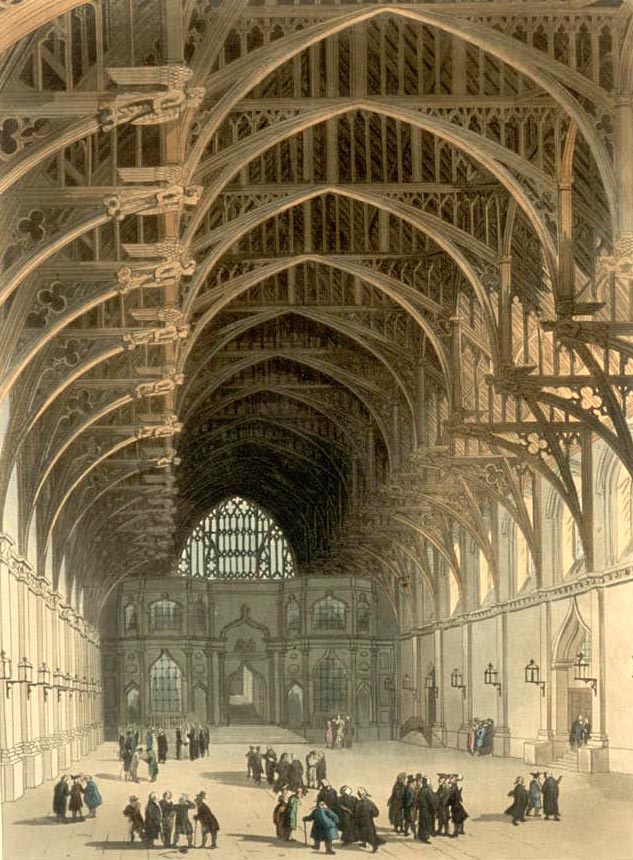
Westminster Hall in the early 19th century

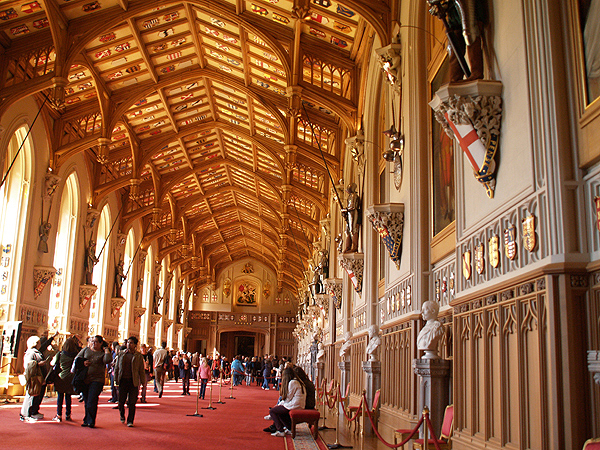
A modern false hammerbeam roof at Windsor Castle

Possibly the earliest hammer-beamed building still standing in England, built in about 1310 and located in Winchester Cathedral Close, is the Pilgrims' Hall, now part of The Pilgrims' School. The lantern of Ely Cathedral (begun 1334) was also an early building to use hammer-beams, though in this case they are arranged around an octagon and concealed by timber vaulting. The carpenter was William Hurley.

The roof of Westminster Hall, which underwent renovation from 1395 to 1399, is a fine example of a hammerbeam roof. The span of Westminster Hall is 20.8 metres (68 ft. 4 in.), and the opening between the ends of the hammer beams 7.77 metres (25 ft. 6 in). The height from the paving of the hall to the hammerbeam is 12.19 m (40 ft.), and to the underside of the collar beam 19.35 metres (63 ft. 6 in.), so that an additional height in the centre of 7.16 m (23 ft. 6 in.) has been gained. In order to give greater strength to the framing, a large arched piece of timber is carried across the hall, rising from the bottom of the wall piece to the centre of the collar beam, the latter also supported by curved braces rising from the end of the hammerbeam.

Other important examples of hammerbeam roofs exist over the halls of Hampton Court and Eltham palaces, and Burghley House near Stamford. There are also numerous examples of smaller dimensions in churches throughout England, particularly in the eastern counties. The ends of the hammerbeams are usually decorated with winged angels holding shields; the curved braces and beams are richly moulded, and the spandrels in the larger examples filled in with tracery, as can be seen in Westminster Hall. Sometimes, but rarely, the collar beam is similarly treated, or cut through and supported by additional curved braces, as in the hall of the Middle Temple, London. There are also secular examples over the Parliament Hall in Edinburgh, the Great Hall in Edinburgh Castle, the Great Hall of Athelhampton House, Dorchester, Dorset and the Great Hall of Darnaway Castle in Moray.

== Modern roofs ==
As part of an extensive restoration project undertaken by Historic Scotland, the hammerbeam roof of the Great Hall at Stirling Castle was completely restored. Green oak from 350 Perthshire trees was used to fabricate and erect 57 hammerbeam trusses spanning approximately 15 metres. Since its construction around 1502 by King James IV of Scotland, structural loads from the roof had caused the walls of the hall to deflect outwards. To ensure that the ridge of the roof would be level and straight, the trusses were each made with a slightly different pitch and span. The restoration started in 1991 and was completed in 1999.

A spectacular modern example of a hammer-beam roof is the new Gothic roof of St George's Hall at Windsor Castle, designed by Giles Downe and completed in 1997, though it does not actually have horizontal hammer-beams. This replaced the previous flatter roof which was destroyed in the 1992 Windsor Castle fire. Other modern examples are in the chapel of New College, Oxford and the Great Hall of Dartington Hall, Totnes (the latter's form based on traces of the medieval roof visible in the wall plaster).

It is incorrectly believed by some that the widest hammerbeam roof in England at 72 ft (22 m) wide is in the train shed at Bristol Temple Meads railway station by Isambard Kingdom Brunel. In fact, the station roof uses modern cantilever construction; the hammerbeam style elements are purely decorative. The hammer posts and brackets support nothing, as all the weight of the roof is braced and supported by the massive side walls via the main timber ribs of the roof and the pillars inside the train shed.

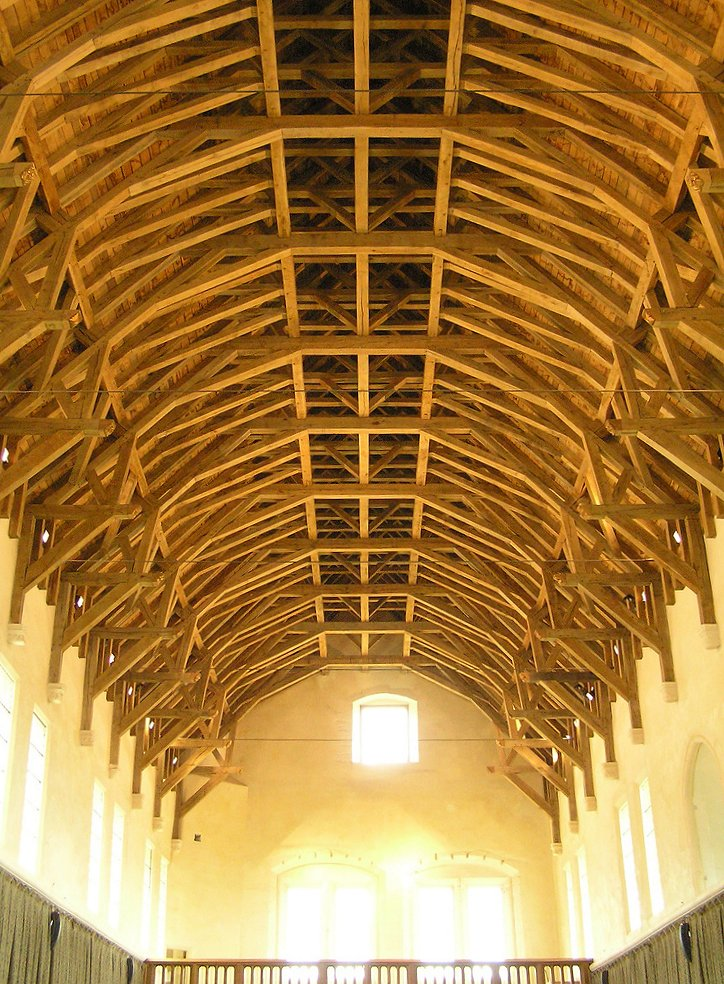
The modern single hammerbeam roof in the Great Hall at Stirling Castle

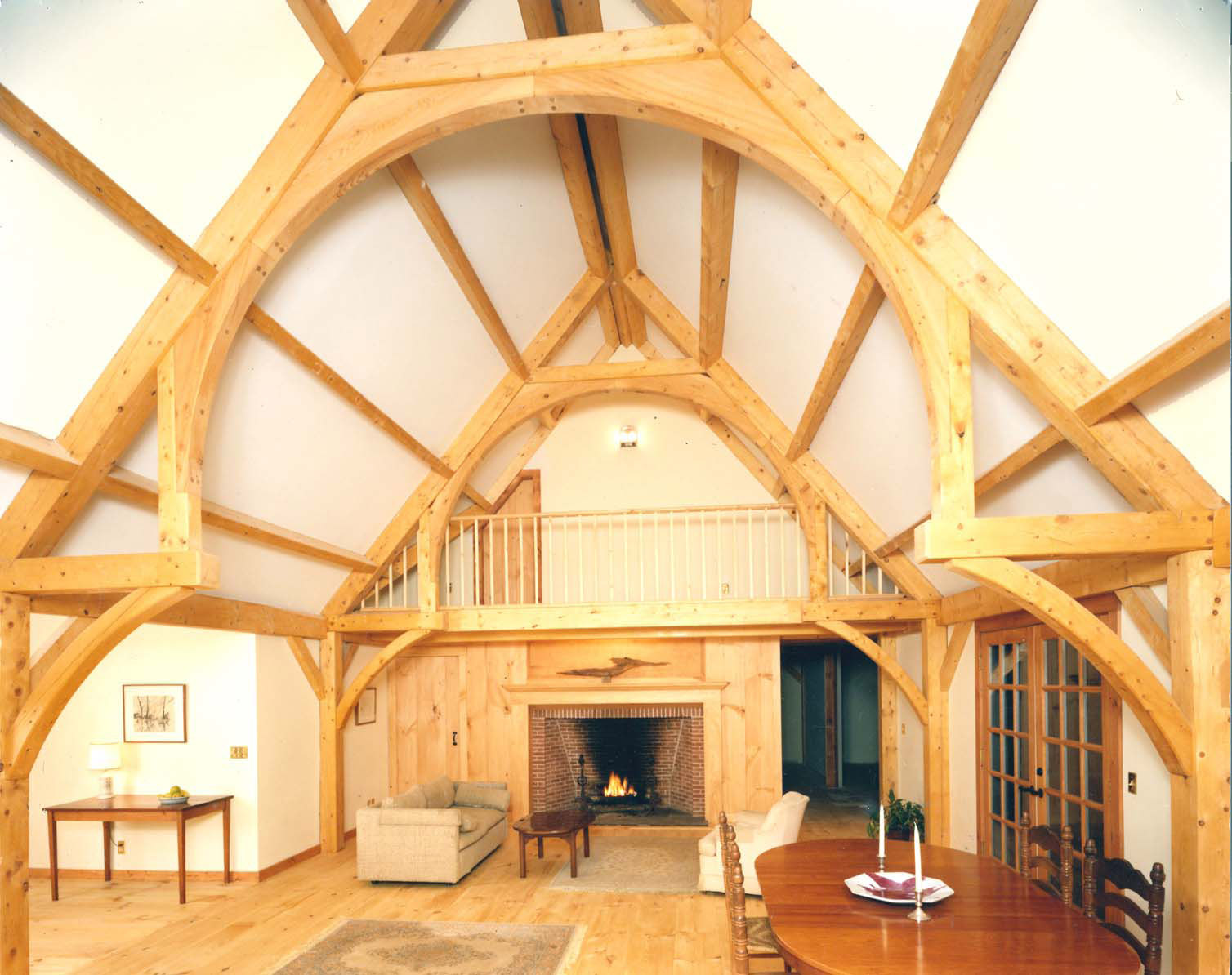
Hammerbeam used inside a modern timber frame residence

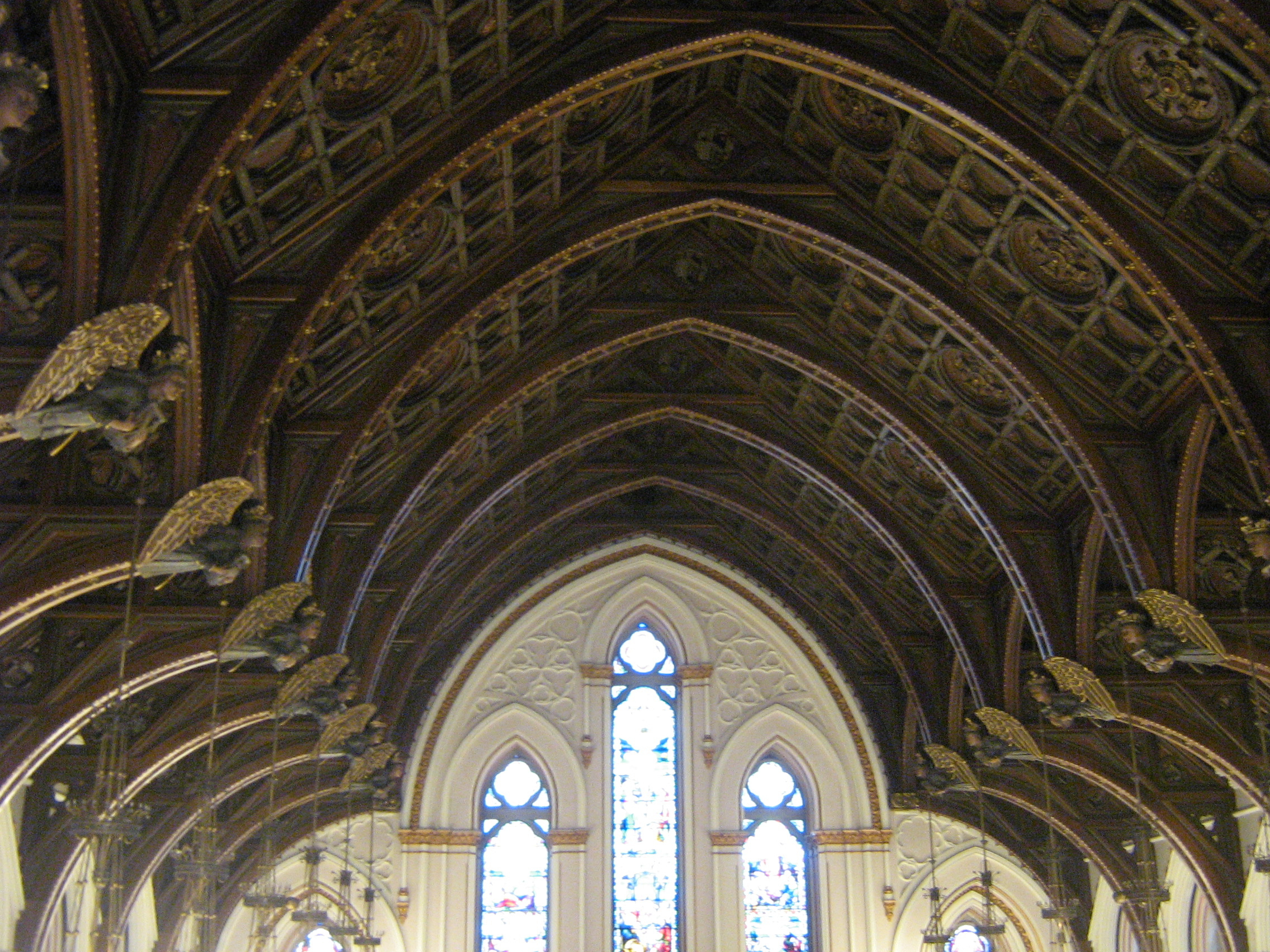
Single hammerbeam ceiling, carved in oak by Patrick Keely at St. Mary – St. Catherine of Siena Parish, Charlestown, Massachusetts

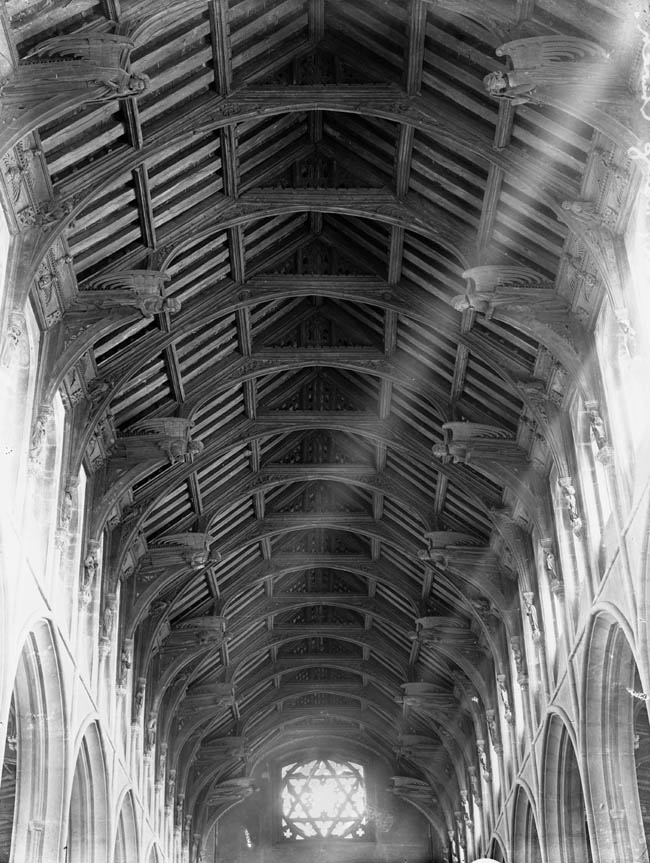
A false hammerbeam roof, Angel's roof, St Mary's Church, Bury St Edmunds, Suffolk

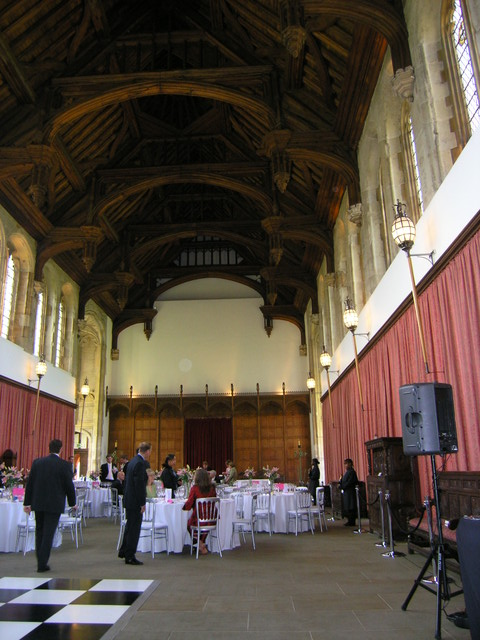
A false hammerbeam roof in the Great Hall of Eltham Palace, England

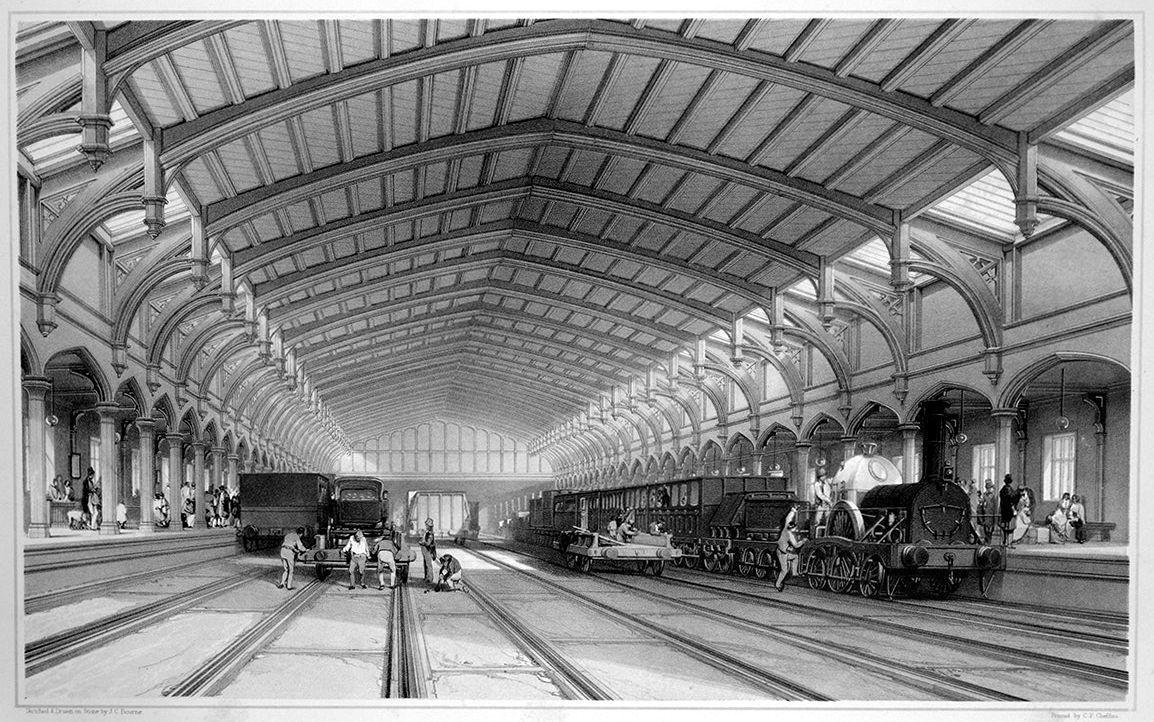
The hammerbeam elements in Bristol's Temple Meads station are purely decorative, not structural.

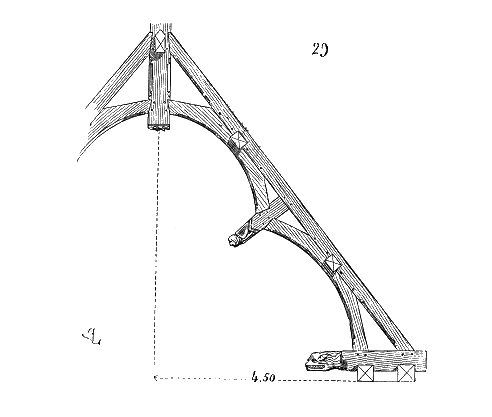
A false hammer-beam roof in the Dictionary of French Architecture from the 11th to the 16th Century (1856) by Eugène Viollet-le-Duc

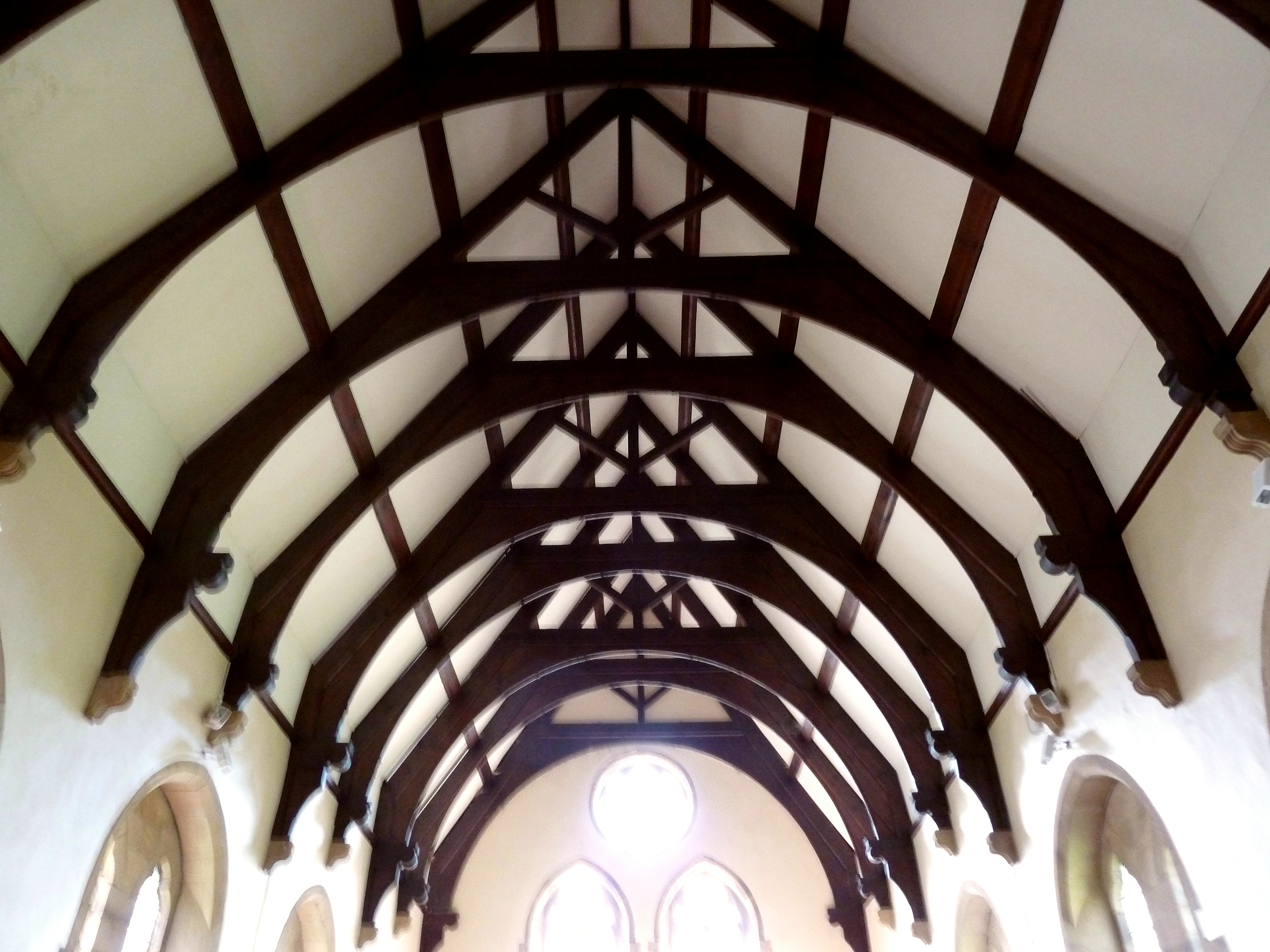
1870 arch-braced hammerbeam roof by Mallinson & Barber at the Church of St Thomas, Thurstonland, West Yorkshire

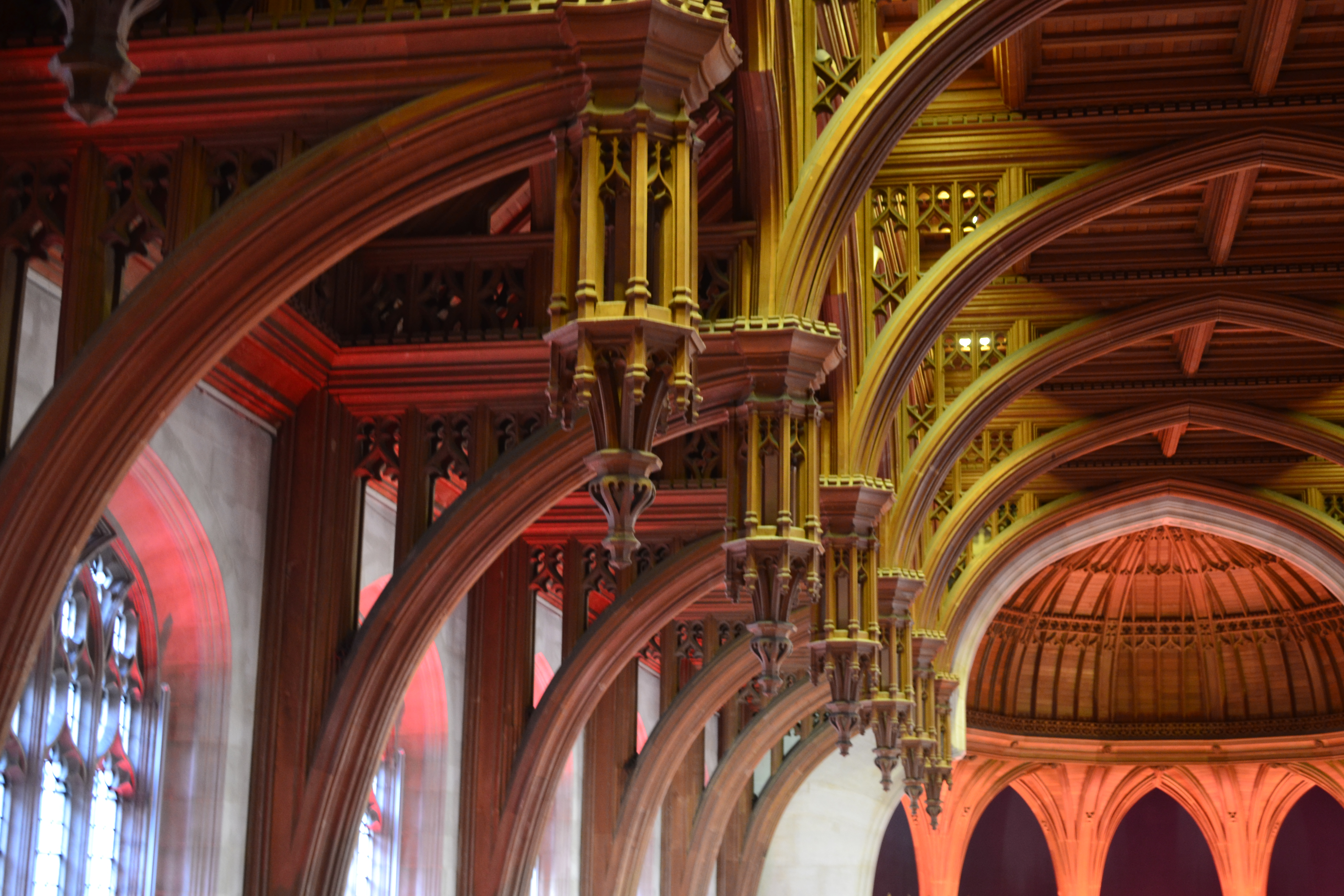
The ornamented pendants in the Great Hall of the Wills Memorial Building (University of Bristol), completed in 1925, bombed in 1940 and restored in the 1960s

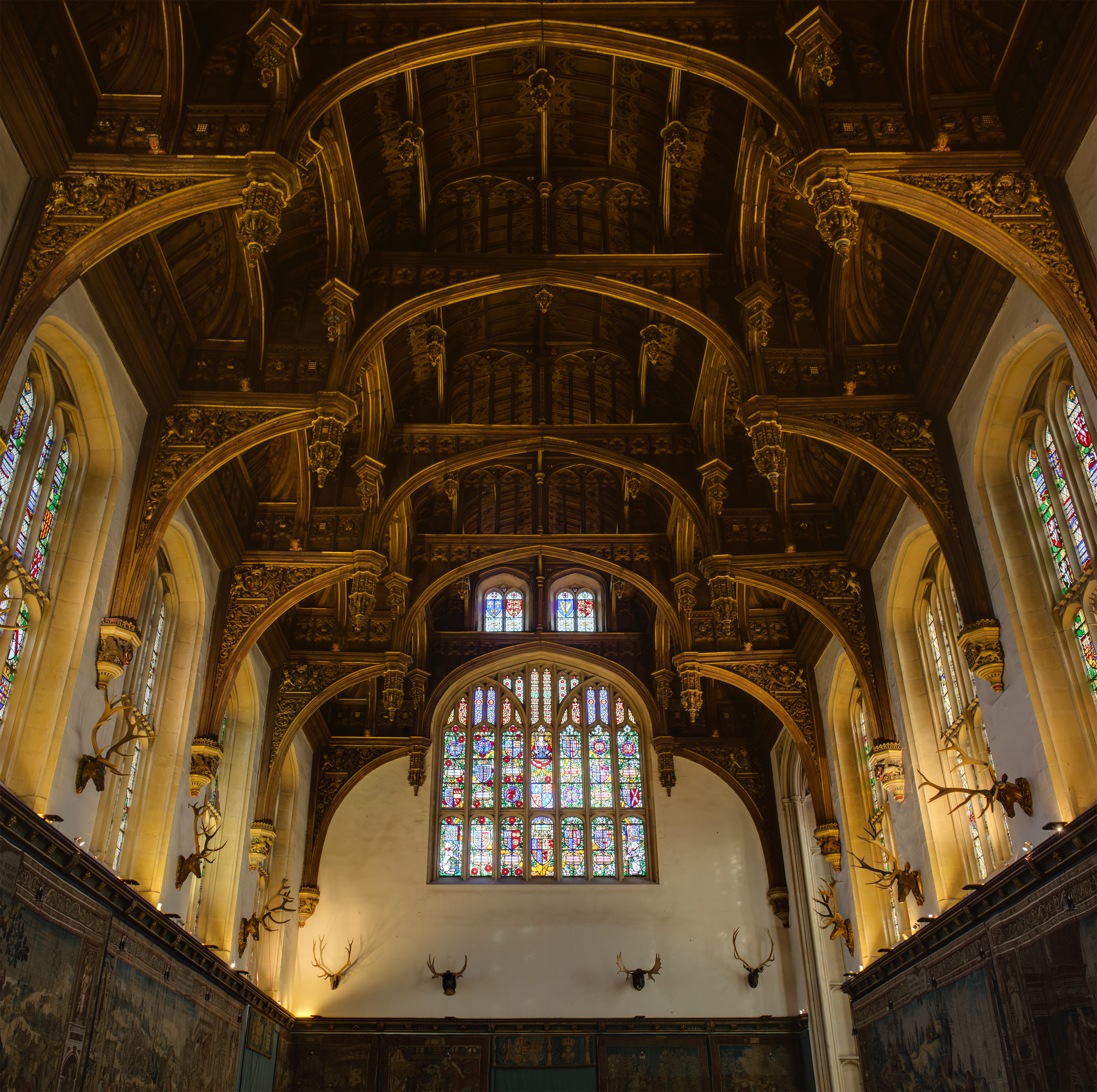
Hampton Court's ornate hammerbeam roof in the Great Hall
