= Basilica of Saint John the Evangelist =

Coordinates: 41.0517°N 73.5400°W

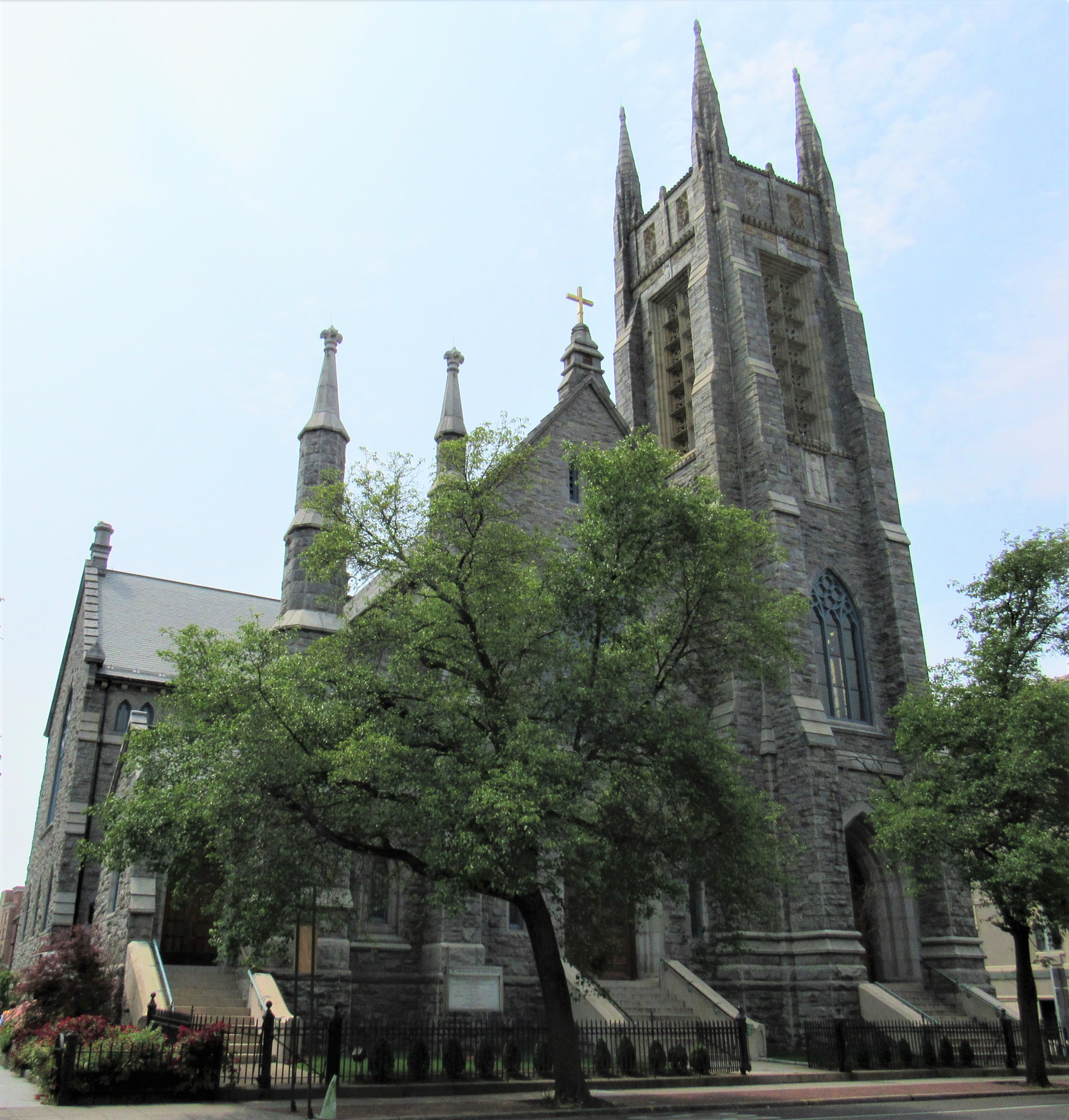
- Basilica of Saint John the Evangelist
- Location: 279 Atlantic Street; Stamford, Connecticut
- Country: United States
- Denomination: Roman Catholic
- Website: stjohnbasilica.org

Architecture
- Architect: James Murphy

Administration
- Province: Hartford
- Diocese: Bridgeport

Clergy
- Bishop: Most Rev. Frank J. Caggiano
- Rector: Rev. Msgr. Stephen M. DiGiovanni, H.E.D.
- Pastor: Very Rev. Cyprian P. La Pastina

The Basilica of Saint John the Evangelist is a Catholic parish church and minor basilica in Stamford, Connecticut, USA. It was founded in the 1850s and the current church was built in 1868 to meet the increasing needs of the congregation. It serves a multi-lingual congregation, including descendants of the original congregation. This Basilica is most well known for their Solemn Mass.

== History ==
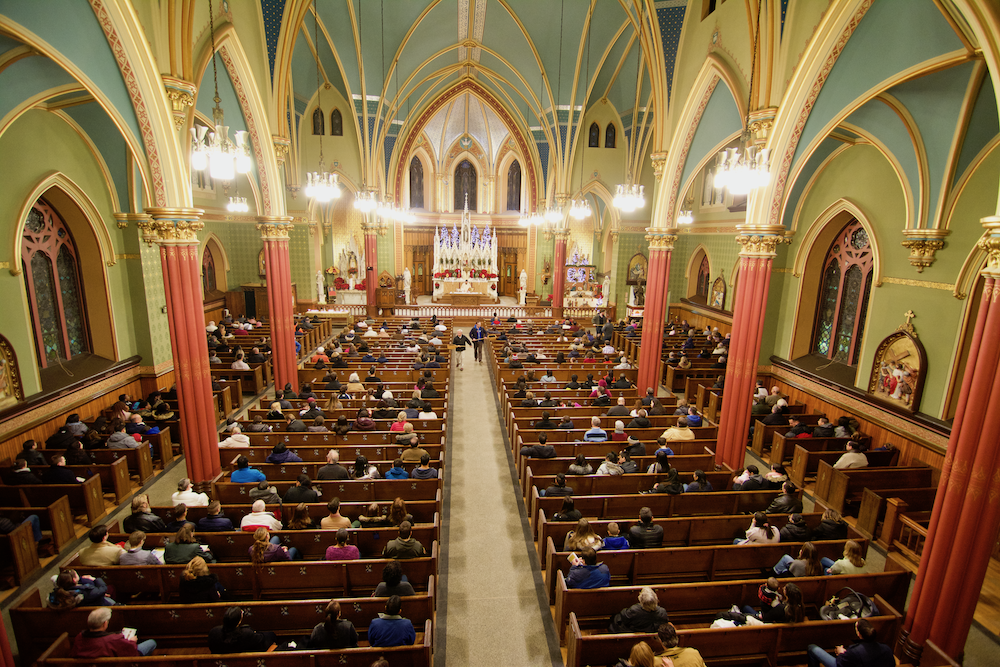
Interior of the Basilica

In 1849, Stamford's small Catholic community purchased land, and, on July 4, broke ground for the original church of Saint John the Evangelist on Meadow Street. The small, one-story wooden framed church structure measured 60 feet by 40 feet, with some rudimentary gothic decorations, a small steeple and a bell. It was dedicated in 1851. By 1854, Saint John's became an independent mission, with Father Edward J. Cooney, its first pastor.

To meet the growing Catholic population, a larger church was built in 1868. A few years later, the adjacent property and private home was purchased to serve as a rectory, and another parcel was purchased to be used in the future for the new parish school and convent. (Note: The rectory and adjacent buildings had been used prior to the Civil War as a stop on the Underground Railroad, which assisted hundreds of African American slaves to freedom.) James Murphy of Providence, Rhode Island was the architect of the new stone church, having designed and constructed fifty-six of the Catholic churches throughout New England. The interior was designed by John Ennis, a Dublin theater designer. The Saint John the Evangelist church was completed and consecrated on May 30, 1886, by Bishop Lawrence Stephen McMahon. It was the largest in the state at the time. It is known as "The Mother Church of Stamford."

Two new convents were constructed at the site of the new church on Atlantic Street. The Saint John's School, completed in 1906 and directly behind the new church, was staffed by the Sisters of Mercy and operated until its closure in 1973. Saint John's Parish donated most of the funding for the construction and outfitting of Saint Joseph's Hospital, which opened its doors in Stamford in 1942 and served the community until 1999.

=== Diverse community ===
Saint John's Parish had been founded by impoverished Irish Catholic immigrants and over time served a congregation of widening backgrounds. Since 1890 apostolates have begun for the Italian immigrants (1890), Polish and Slovak immigrants (1900), Hispanic community, and Haitian Catholics (1972).

=== Urban development ===
In response to Saint John's support of the city's urban development program through donations of seed money and land, the city named the three affordable housing apartments, Saint John's Towers after the parish. The Bishop of Bridgeport and the Pastor of Saint John's Church are ex-officio members of the board of directors of the Saint John's Urban Development Corporation, the legal entity that oversees the housing complex.

=== Minor Basilica ===
On July 16, 2009, Pope Benedict XVI raised Saint John's Parish to the dignity and title of Minor Basilica based upon its sanctuary size, historical importance, art and recognition within the Diocese. At that time, there were 65 Minor Basilicas in the United States and 1,561 in the world. Regarding the state of the sanctuary and its artwork:

The gothic High Altar of white Carrera marble and golden Mexican onyx dates to the church’s opening in 1886. The altar crucifix above the tabernacle is from the original 1851 church. The three stained-glass windows above the sanctuary, depicting the Incarnation, the Crucifixion, and the Resurrection, are Dutch in origin and the oldest in the church, dating to 1886."

== Overview ==
The rector of the church is Monsignor Stephen M. DiGiovanni. Mass is held and confessions are heard each day. On Sunday there are Latin, English and French & Creole services.

Saint John's membership consists of people of domestic and international backgrounds. Confessions are heard daily before each Mass in Italian, Spanish, French, Creole, Portuguese, as well as English.

The church has a seating capacity of 1,600 and exterior dimensions of 100 by 180 feet.
