= Bernard O'Reilly (bishop of Hartford) =

Catholic bishop (1803 – c. 1856)

Right Rev. Bernard O'Reilly
- Bishop of Hartford
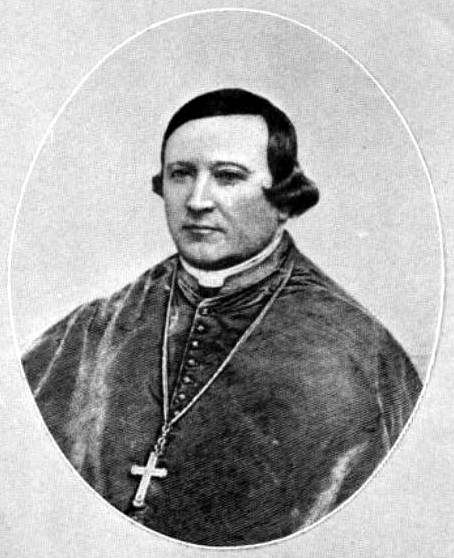
- Church: Roman Catholic Church
- See: Hartford
- In office: 10 November 1850 – after 23 January 1856
- Predecessor: William Tyler
- Successor: Francis Patrick McFarland

Orders
- Ordination: 16 October 1831
- Consecration: 10 November 1850

Personal details
- Born: 1 March 1803 Columcille, County Longford, Ireland
- Died: 23 January 1856 (aged 52) (presumed) SS Pacific (disappeared)

Bernard O'Reilly (1 March 1803 – after 23 January 1856) was an Irish-born Catholic prelate. Known for his service during the 1832 cholera outbreak in New York, he later served as Bishop of Hartford from 1850 until his death in 1856.

== Biography ==
=== Early life ===
Bernard O'Reilly was born on 1 March 1803 in Columcille, County Longford, in Ireland. His brother was Reverend William O'Reilly, who eventually became vicar general of the Diocese of Hartford.

Bernard O'Reilly embarked for the United States in January 1825, planning to study there for the priesthood. He attended the Seminary of Montreal in Montreal, Quebec, before completing his theological studies at St. Mary's Seminary in Baltimore, Maryland.

=== Priesthood ===
O'Reilly was ordained a priest for the Diocese of New York in Philadelphia by Bishop Francis Kenrick on 13 October 1831. After his ordination, the diocese assigned O'Reilly to the pastoral staff at St. James Parish in Brooklyn, New York. During the cholera epidemic in New York during the summer of 1832, O'Reilly distinguished himself caring for the sick; he contracted the disease twice.

The diocese in December 1832 transferred O'Reilly to serve as pastor at St. Patrick Parish in Rochester, New York, then the only Catholic parish in that city. Under O'Reilly's direction, the parishioners purchased a larger Methodist church to replace their current one. In 1834, O'Reilly was sent to a new Catholic parish in Rochester, St. Mary's Church of the Assumption. However, a financial collapse in Rochester forced the closure of St. Mary's later in 1834 and O'Reilly returned to St. Patrick.

One night in December 1839, O'Reilly was attacked while sleeping by a priest he had suspended. O'Reilly was injured, but was sufficiently recovered to deliver a speech on Valentine's Day in February 1840 O'Reilly in 1847 traveled to Mexico to serve as executor of his brother's substantial estate. While there, he ministered to US Army troops fighting in the Mexican-American War.

In 1847, the Vatican erected the Diocese of Buffalo, which included the Rochester area. O'Reilly was now incardinated, or transferred, to the new diocese. The first bishop of Buffalo, John Timon, named O'Reilly as his vicar general. His duties included the supervision of the diocesan seminary in Buffalo.

=== Bishop of Hartford ===
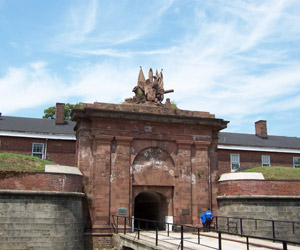
Fort Columbus (now known as Fort Jay) New York City (2005)

On 9 August 1850, O'Reilly was appointed the second bishop of Hartford by Pope Pius IX. He received his episcopal consecration on 10 November 1850 from Timon, with Bishops John McCloskey and John Fitzpatrick serving as co-consecrators, at St. Patrick Church in Rochester.

One of O'Reilly's battles was with anti-Catholic prejudice. In May 1851, the commandant of Fort Columbus in New York Harbor ordered the jailing of 21 Catholic soldiers for refusing to attend Protestant religious services. He tried one of the soldiers, who was found guilty and sentenced to the stockade for two months. In response, O'Reilly wrote a fiery letter denouncing the action to the Boston Pilot newspaper in Boston. He signed the letter with the pseudonym "Roger Williams". Williams was the Protestant founder of the Providence Plantations in 1636 and a champion of religious freedom. The War Department of the US Government in Washington D.C. overturned the soldier's conviction in July 1851.

During the 1850s, there were few American priests and religious sisters in New England to serve the growing Irish Catholic immigrant populations. As a result, bishops were forced to recruit them from other American states and from Ireland. In 1851, O'Reilly persuaded the Sisters of Mercy in Pittsburgh, Pennsylvania, to send a contingent of religious sisters to Providence. They started teaching Sunday school and recruiting other sisters. They then began providing food to the poor and took over the school at the Cathedral of Sts. Peter and Paul. Also in 1851, the sisters, with O'Reilly's help, opened the first Catholic orphanage in Rhode Island, the second in the entire New England region. Two other orphanages would open during O'Reilly's tenure as bishop.

In 1852, during a trip to Ireland, O'Reilly convinced several newly graduated priests from All Hallows College in Dublin to come to the United States. He also recruited Reverend Thomas Hendricken from St. Patrick's College in Maynooth, Ireland, a future bishop of the Diocese of Providence. The Sisters of Mercy also established convents in Hartford and New Haven, Connecticut.

O'Reilly attended the First Plenary Council of Baltimore in 1852. After the end of the council, he traveled to Washington for a meeting with US President Millard Fillmore.

Throughout the 1850s, there was extensive prejudice against Catholics and Irish immigrants in New England. During their travels throughout Providence, the sisters frequently became targets of taunts and insults. At one point in 1855, a mob marched on the Sisters of Mercy convent in that city. When they arrived at the convent, they found it being guarded by O'Reilly and a group of young Irish men. He told the mob, "The sisters are in their home. They shall not leave it for an hour. I shall protect them while I have life, and if needs be, register their safety with my blood." At this point, the mob dispersed.

=== Death ===
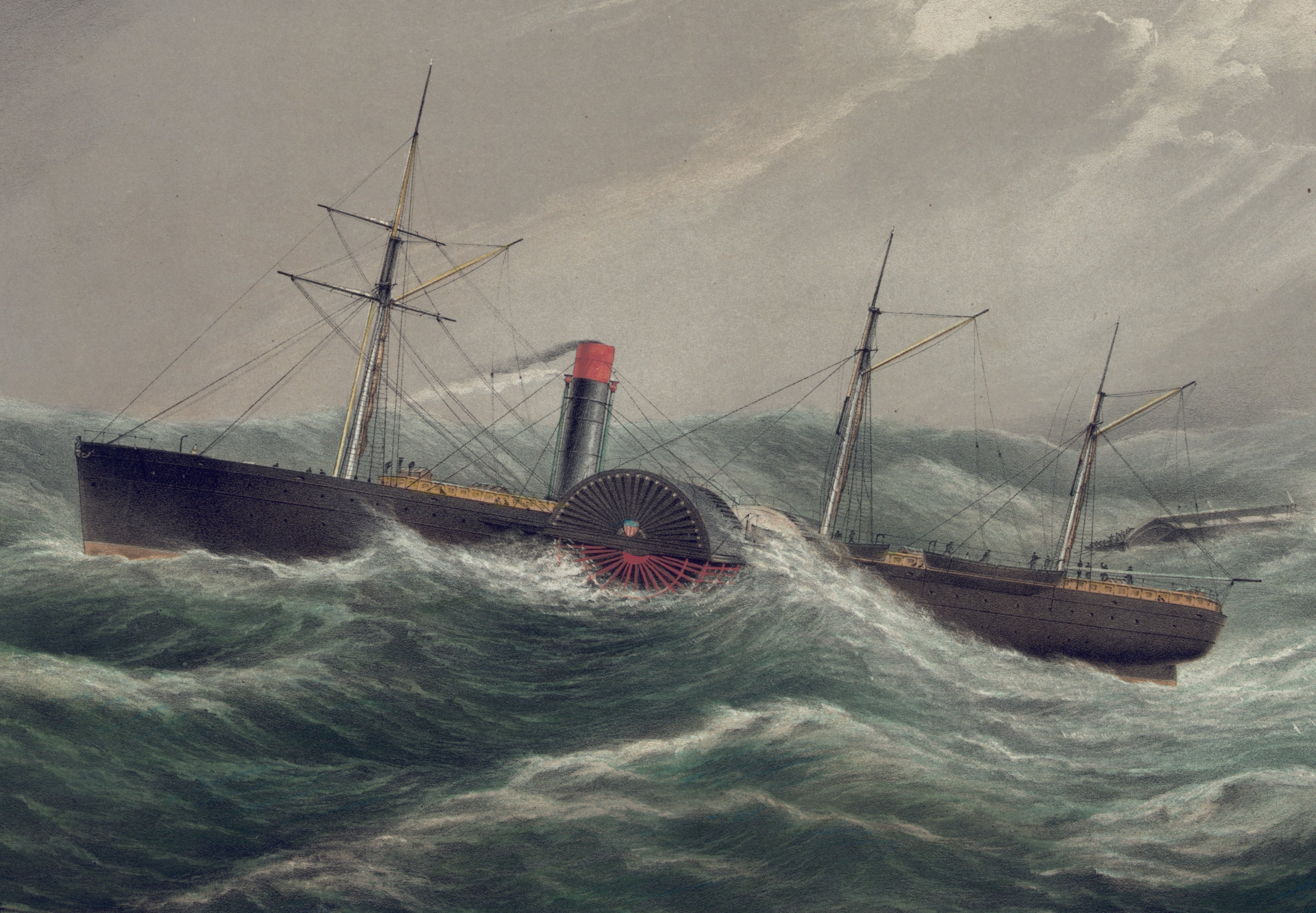
USM Pacific (1849)

O'Reilly visited Europe to recruit more priests in December 1855. After stopping in Ireland to visit his parents, O'Reilly boarded the SS Pacific in Liverpool, England, on 23 January 1856 for the voyage home.

The Pacific never arrived in New York; the speculation then was that the ship hit an iceberg and sank off the coast of Newfoundland.

== See also ==
- Catholic Church in the United States
- Historical list of the Catholic bishops of the United States
- List of Catholic bishops of the United States
- Lists of patriarchs, archbishops, and bishops

Catholic Church titles
Preceded by William Tyler	Bishop of Hartford; 1850–1856	Succeeded by Francis Patrick McFarland
