= Mary Augustine Barber =

American educator and Visitation sister

Sister Mary Augustine
- Jerusha Booth Barber

Personal life
- Born: Jerusha Booth; July 20, 1789 Newtown, Connecticut
- Died: January 1, 1860 (aged 70) Summerville, near Mobile, Alabama, U.S.
- Spouse: Virgil Horace Barber (m. 1807)
- Children: Mary (b. 1810); Abigail (b. 1811); Susan (b. 1813); Samuel (b. 1814); Josephine (b. 1816)

Religious life
- Religion: Roman Catholic
- Order: Visitation of Holy Mary
- Institute: Georgetown Visitation
- Profession: Educator
- Consecration: February 23, 1820

Senior posting

Jerusha Booth Barber, in religion, Sister Mary Augustine (née Jerusha Booth; also Mrs. Jerusha Barber; Sister Mary Austin; Sister May Augustin; 1789 - January 1, 1860) was a 19th-century American educator and Visitation sister. She entered the Georgetown Visitation Convent in 1818, with her husband entering the Jesuits. She founded a convent of visitation in Kaskaskia, Illinois, in 1836, remaining there till 1844. She taught in a convent in St. Louis, Missouri, from 1844 till 1848, and in Mobile, Alabama, until the time of her death. Her only son, Samuel, became a Jesuit, and her four daughters entered the convent.

== Early years ==
Barber was born in Newton, Connecticut, in 1789. Her parents were pious Protestants, strict members of their church.

== Career ==
She married Virgil Horace Barber on September 20, 1807, when she was 19 and he was about 25. The husband and wife did not precipitately embrace the Catholic religion, but the husband thought Protestantism too superficial, too recent, too worldly and too inconsistent. He had been an Episcopalian clergyman and principal of their academy in Fairfield, New York. He determined to become a Roman Catholic and moved to New York where his mentor, Benedict Joseph Fenwick, received his family into the Catholic Church in 1816. Jerusha was 28 and they had five children: Mary (b. 1810); Abigail (b. 1811); Susan (b. 1813); Samuel (b. 1814); and Josephine (b. 1816). For support they opened a school, but after eight months both determined to join the religious life and, under Fenwick's direction, moved to Georgetown in Washington, D.C.

In Washington, D.C., the couple went through the process of separation. Jerusha and her children were placed in a convent while the husband went to Rome to study towards ordination. In 1818 Jerusha entered the Visitation convent of Georgetown which also housed her three eldest daughters, while the baby, Josephine, was placed in the home of Fenwick's mother. When she thought she was pregnant, she left the community for a short period, but soon returned. On February 23, 1820, husband and wife took their religious vows, she as Sister Mary Augustine.

Mary was a woman of superior education, and the convent and school progressed rapidly during her residence. In 1836 she founded a visitation convent in Kaskaskia, Illinois, where she remained until 1844. She was especially successful in training the younger sisters to be accomplished teachers, and was engaged in this occupation in the convent of St. Louis from 1844 till 1848, and in Mobile up to the time of her death. She died in Summerville, near Mobile, in 1860. Their only son, Samuel, became a Jesuit, and their four daughters entered the Ursuline convent.
