= Francis Patrick McFarland =

Catholic bishop

The Right Reverend Francis Patrick McFarland
- Bishop of Hartford
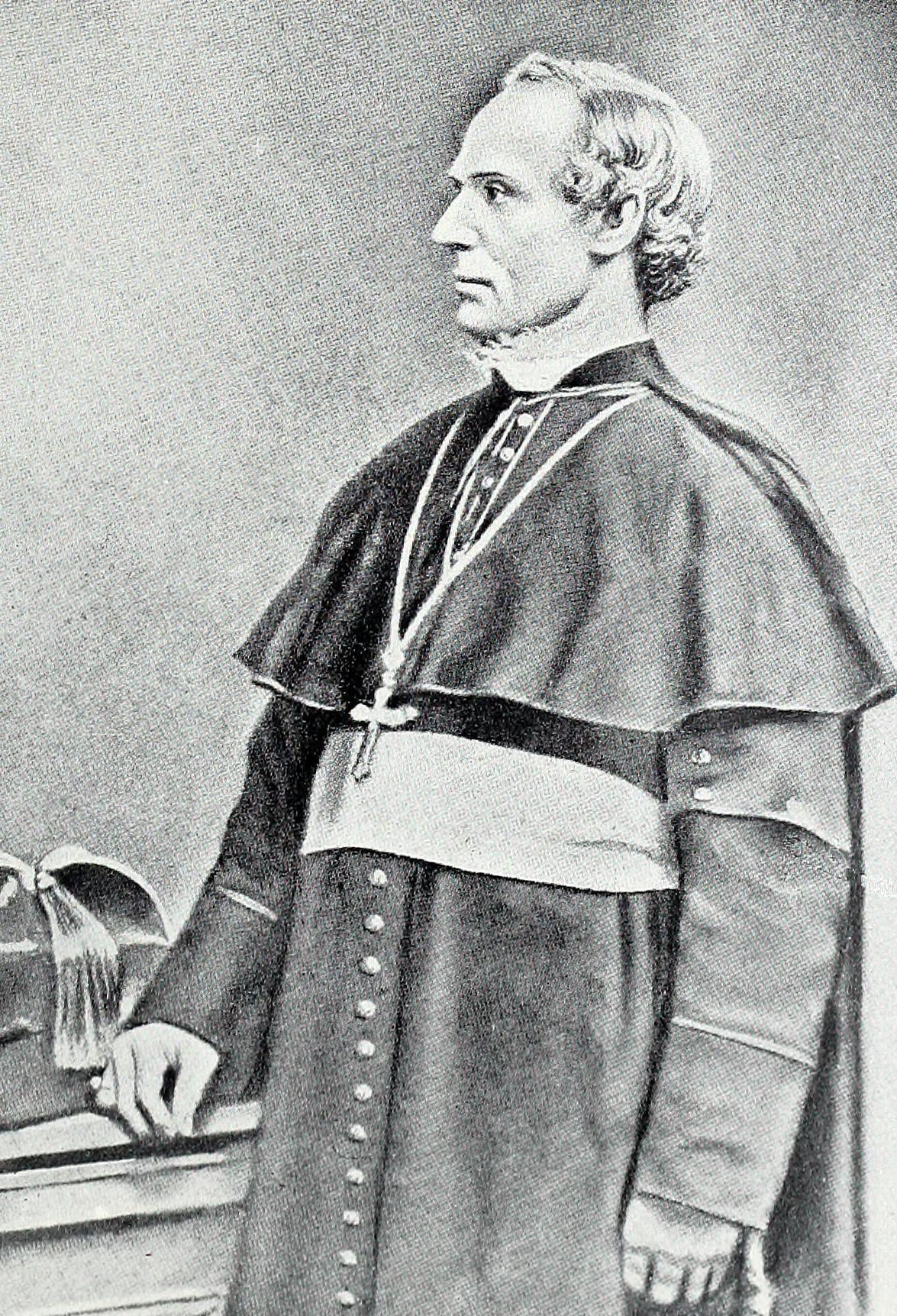
- Church: Catholic
- Diocese: Hartford, Connecticut
- Appointed: January 8, 1858
- Predecessor: Bernard O'Reilly
- Successor: Thomas Galberry

Orders
- Ordination: May 18, 1845 by John Joseph Hughes
- Consecration: March 14, 1858 by John Joseph Hughes

Personal details
- Born: April 16, 1819 Franklin, Pennsylvania, US
- Died: October 2, 1874 (aged 55) Hartford, Connecticut, US
- Parents: John McFarland and Mary McKeever
- Education: Mount St. Mary's College

Francis Patrick McFarland (April 16, 1819 – October 2, 1874) was an American Catholic prelate who served as bishop of Hartford from 1858 until his death in 1874.

== Biography ==
=== Early life ===
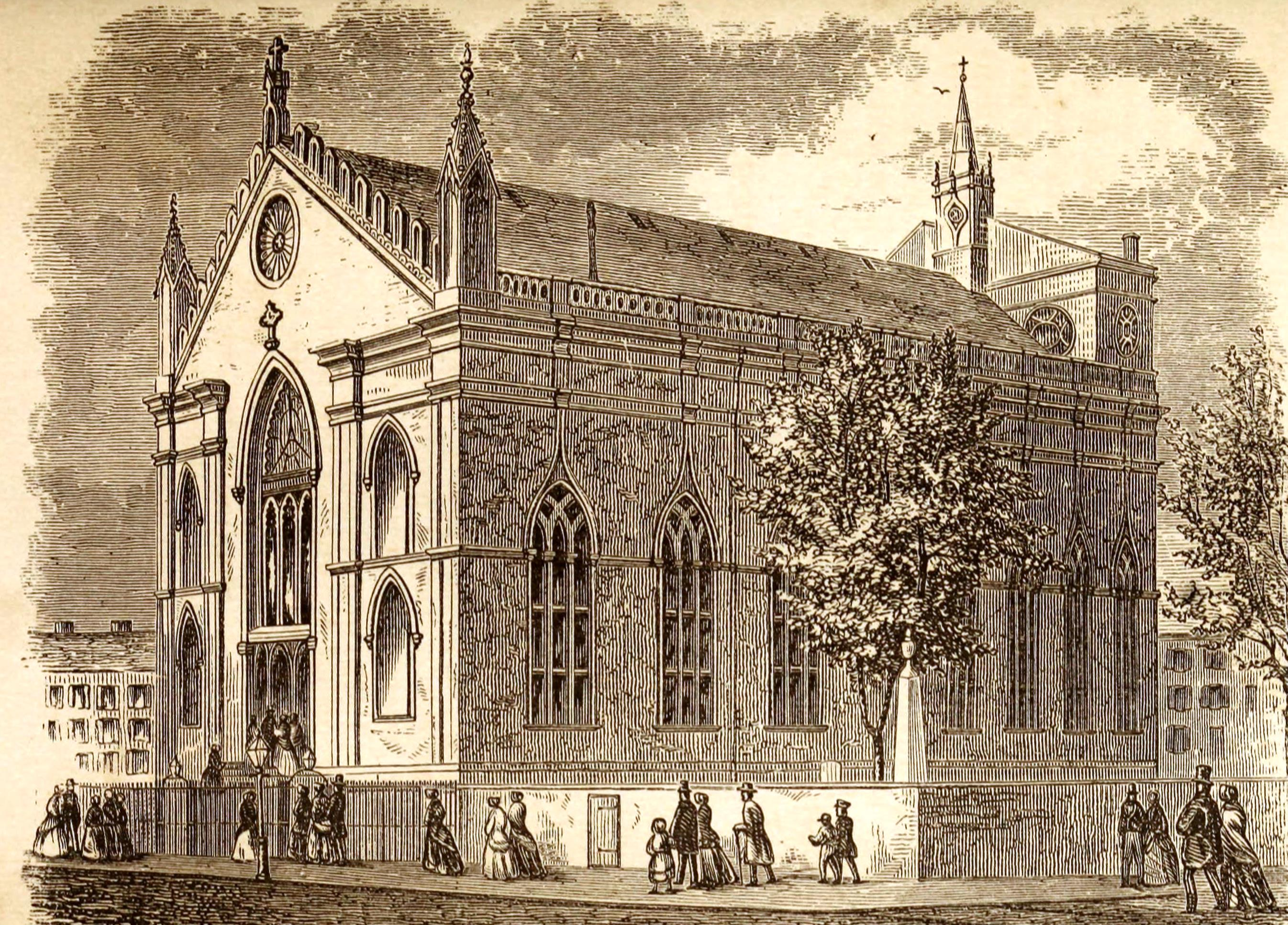
St. Patrick Old Cathedral, New York City (1876)

Francis McFarland was born in Franklin, Pennsylvania on April 16, 1819. His parents, John McFarland and Mary McKeever, emigrated to the United States from Armagh in Ireland. They took up farming near Waynesboro, Pennsylvania.

After finishing his early education, Francis was employed as teacher in the village school. Deciding that he want to become a priest, he then entered Mount St. Mary's College in Emmitsburg, Maryland. McFarland graduated from Mount St. Mary's with high honours and was hired to teach there.

=== Priesthood ===
On May 18, 1845, McFarland was ordained into the priesthood for the Diocese of New York at St. Patrick's Old Cathedral in New York City by Bishop John Hughes. After McFarland's ordination, Hughes appointed him to the faculty of St. John's College in the Bronx. While teaching at St. John's, he also made missionary journeys to remote parts of the diocese, frequently visiting the sick in Stamford, Connecticut.

McFarland soon realized that he enjoyed pastoral work more than teaching. He left St. John's to serve as an assistant pastor at the Church of St. Joseph in the Greenwich Village section of New York City. The diocese in 1846 then assigned McFarland to conduct missionary work out of St. Mary's Church in Watertown in the North Country region of New York State.

In 1847, the Vatican removed all of Upstate New York from the Diocese of New York, creating the Dioceses of Buffalo and Albany. Since Watertown now resided in the Diocese of Albany, McFarland was incardinated, or transferred there. In March 1851, the first bishop of Albany, John McCloskey, moved McFarland to serve as pastor at St. John's Parish in Utica, New York.

=== Bishop of Hartford ===
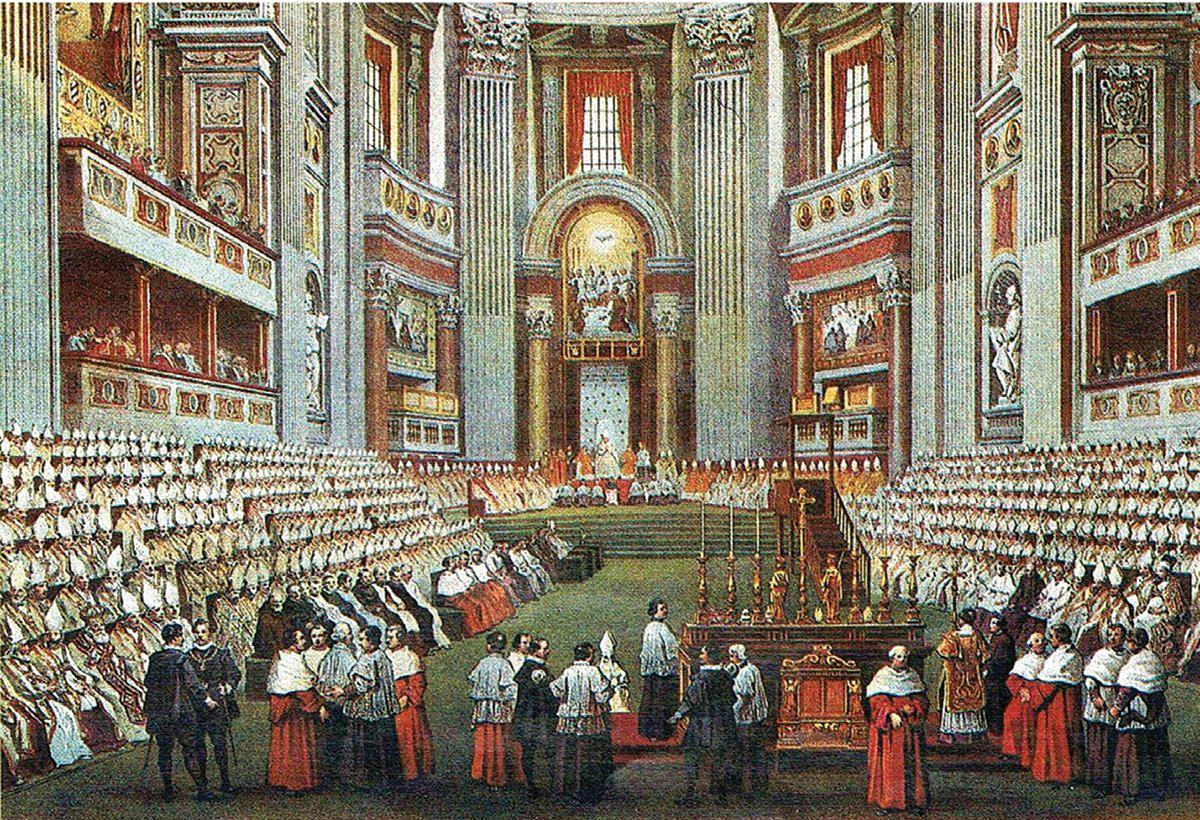
First Vatican Council, Rome (1870)

On March 9, 1857, Pope Pius IX appointed McFarland as vicar apostolic of the new Apostolic Vicariate of Florida. This position would have given him ecclesiastical jurisdiction over the entire State of Florida. However, McFarland declined the appointment.

One year later, in January 1858, Pius IX named McFarland as the second bishop of Hartford, which he accepted. He was consecrated at St. Patrick's Church in Providence, Rhode Island on March 14, 1858, by Archbishop Hughes; the sermon was delivered by Bishop McCloskey.

At this time, the Diocese of Hartford included the states of Connecticut and Rhode Island. Because the majority of Catholics in the diocese lived in Providence, Rhode Island, rather than Hartford, Connecticut, McFarland followed the lead of his two predecessors by residing in Providence.

McFarland made repeated attempts to communicate to the community that Catholics were loyal Americans. After the outbreak of the American Civil War in 1861, he encouraged Catholics to actively support the federal government. McFarland frequently spoke to congregations at Protestant churches in Rhode Island.

While visiting England in 1863, McFarland met Reverend Florimonde DeBruycker, a Belgian priest. McFarland convinced him to come to Connecticut to organize French-Canadian workers into parishes. He would ultimately recruit more Belgian priests to staff both French-Canadian and German parishes. McFarland also recruited an Italian priest to minister to the growing Italian immigrant population in New Haven, Connecticut.

To staff schools, orphanages and other charitable institutions, McFarland recruited religious brothers and sisters from the Franciscan Friars, the Sisters of the Third Order of St. Francis, the Christian Brothers, the Sisters of Charity, and the Congregation De Notre Dame.

In 1869, McFarland travelled to Rome to participate with other bishops in the First Vatican Council. While there, he announced his plan to resign as bishop of Hartford because he was no longer healthy enough to handle the job. The American bishops then asked Pius IX to lessen McFarland's responsibilities by moving Rhode Island out of the Diocese of Hartford into its own diocese. The Vatican erected the Diocese of Providence in 1872 and McFarland decided to remain as bishop in Hartford.

In 1872, McFarland moved the episcopal see to Hartford. Since Hartford did not have a suitable church to be a cathedral, he purchased an estate in Hartford to serve as the site of the new cathedral. He built a convent there for the Sisters of Mercy religious order and designated the convent chapel, St. Joseph's, as the diocesan pro-cathedral (temporary cathedral). McFarland dedicated the convent chapel in 1873. It would be up to his successors to construct Hartford's cathedral

=== Death and legacy ===
By 1873, McFarland's health was declining rapidly. He visited Aiken, South Carolina, a popular winter resort, and then Richlands, Virginia, in efforts to rebuild his strength. He finally returned to Hartford to spend his remaining time.

McFarland died in Hartford on October 2, 1874, at age 55. He was buried on the grounds of St. Joseph's Chapel, then reinterred in the crypt of the first St. Joseph's Cathedral in 1892. After the cathedral was destroyed by fire in 1958, McFarland's remains were re-interred with those of other bishops in Mount Saint Benedict Cemetery in Bloomfield, Connecticut.

== See also ==
- Catholic Church in the United States
- Historical list of the Catholic bishops of the United States
- List of Catholic bishops of the United States

Catholic Church titles
Preceded by Bernard O'Reilly	Bishop of Hartford; 1858–1875	Succeeded by Thomas Galberry
