= Joseph Sibbel =

American sculptor

- Born: June 7, 1850; Dülmen
- Died: July 10, 1907 (aged 57); New York City
- Occupation: Sculptor

Joseph Sibbel (b. Dulmen, 7 June 1850; d. in New York City, 10 July 1907) was a German-born sculptor.

As a boy he evinced the inclination for cutting ornaments and figures from wood, which attracted the attention of his teacher, who urged the parents of the boy to send him to Munster, Westphalia. At the establishment of the wood carver, Friedrich A. Ewertz, Sibbel developed an interest in ecclesiastical sculpture. He spent his leisure time in visiting the studio of the sculptor Theodore Achterman, where he acquired the art of modeling in clay.

In 1873 he emigrated to Cincinnati, Ohio. Here he joined several other artists from the same workshop, who had established an atelier for ecclesiastical sculpture, mostly in wood. When this enterprise failed, he tried his hand at secular sculpture with a certain Louis Rebisso. When this establishment also failed, Sibbel came to New York, where he established the studio from which issued his many works. To emulate foreign ecclesiastical decoration was his aim. His first work in New York was a lectern, cast in bronze, for the Episcopal Stewart Memorial Cathedral in Garden City, Long Island. Here the young artist broke loose from the ordinary form by placing religious groups in front of the stand. Below the customary eagle with spread wings he designed an upright figure of Christ blessing a group at his feet. The sermon desk proper he adorned with a symbolical group of three figures, typifying youth, maturity, and age, listening to the word of God from above.

It was not until he furnished for the cathedral in Hartford, Connecticut, a series of alto-relievos, prominent among which was an altar picture representing the Christ-child disputing with the Scribes in the temple, that the Catholic churches began to appreciate him. These and a series of Stations of the Cross were cast in imitation alabaster, and attracted much attention, as did his colossal statue of Archbishop Feehan of Chicago. A second cast of those Stations of the Cross can be found in Charlestown at St Mary– St. Catherine of Siena Parish in Charlestown, Massachusetts. His works showed emancipation from the conventionality of the cloister-art of modern times. His best-known work is the heroic statue of St. Patrick in St. Patrick's Cathedral, New York. Here also are to be found his statues of St. Anselm, St. Bernard of Clairvaux, St. Alphonsus Liguori, and St. Bonaventure.

Two heroic panels, representing "Our Lady Comforter of the Afflicted" and "The Death of St. Joseph", are erected in the Church of St. Francis Xavier in St. Louis, Missouri. These groups, each twelve feet high and eight feet wide, were carved from one block weighing nearly nine tons. The four heroic statues in St. Joseph's Seminary, Dunwoodie, New York, have been classed as the final step in his break from conventionality. These figures represent Isaac Jogues, the slain apostle of the Mohawk Native Americans; St. Rose of Lima, the first canonized saint of the New World; St. Turibius; and Kateri Tekakwitha, the Mohawk woman and first Native American convert to Catholicism. In these statues the artist ventured on a new path in religious sculpture, portraying typical American subjects.

Among his last works was the exterior and interior statuary decoration of St. Paul's Cathedral in Pittsburgh. Among these statues are represented the Apostles and Doctors of the Church, executed in Indiana limestone. In the conception of each statue there is expressed a different idea, for instance the marble statue representing Purgatory. Here the artist represents in two figures a very complex idea. Out of the flames of torture there rises a female figure, symbolic of a liberated soul casting off the veil of darkness and beholding the light of eternal reward. Below, there appears a still afflicted soul, represented by a wan male figure imploring intercession.
