= Thomas Galberry =

Irish Augustinian friar

Right Reverend Thomas Galberry O.S.A.
- Bishop of Hartford
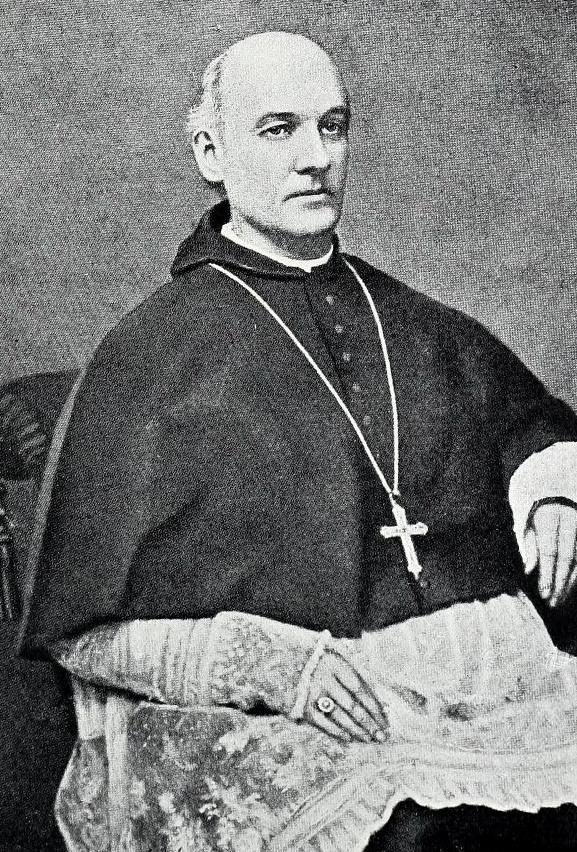
- Church: Roman Catholic Church
- See: Hartford
- In office: March 19, 1876 – October 10, 1878
- Predecessor: Francis Patrick McFarland
- Successor: Lawrence Stephen McMahon

Orders
- Ordination: December 20, 1856 by John Neumann
- Consecration: March 19, 1876 by John Joseph Williams

Personal details
- Born: May 28, 1833 Naas, County Kildare, Ireland
- Died: October 10, 1878 (aged 45) New York, New York, United States
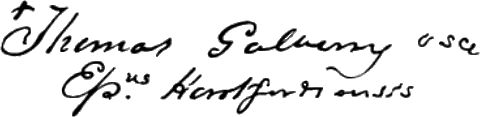
- Signature

Thomas Galberry, OSA (May 28, 1833 – October 10, 1878) was an Irish-born Catholic prelate who served as bishop of Hartford from 1876 until his death in 1878. He was a member of the Augustinians.

Galberry previously served as the president of Villanova College in Pennsylvania from 1827 to 1876 and as provincial superior of the Augustinian missions in the United States in 1874.

== Biography ==
=== Early life ===
Thomas Galberry was born on May 28, 1833, in Naas, County Kildare, in Ireland to Thomas and Margaret (née White) Galberry. In 1836, his family moved to the United States, where they settled in Philadelphia, Pennsylvania. Galberry received his early education at schools in Philadelphia.

At age 14, Galberry in 1847 enrolled at Villanova College to study the classics. The Augustinian order had opened Villanova in 1844. After graduating in 1851, Galberry decided to become a priest. He entered the Augustinian novitiate at Villanova in January 1852. A year later, Galberry made his profession to the Augustinians. He then studied theology, scripture and oratory at Villanova for three more years. During this time, Galberry also served as a professor and disciplinarian at the college.

=== Priesthood ===
Galberry was ordained to the priesthood for the Augustinian Order by Bishop John Neumann in Philadelphia on December 20, 1856. After his ordination, Galverry taught at Villanova College until 1858. At that time, the Augustinians assigned him as pastor of the St. Denis Mission Parish in Havertown, Pennsylvania.

In January 1860, the Augustinians transferred Galberry to St. John's Mission Parish in Lansingburgh, New York. At his new parish, Galberry tore down the dilapidated church building in 1864, replacing it with the new St. Augustine's Church in 1865. To staff a parish school, Galberry recruited a contingent of religious sisters from the Sisters of St. Joseph in Carondelet, Missouri, building a convent for them. He also founded St. Johns-on-the-Hill Cemetery in Lansingburgh.

In 1866, the Augustinians also named Galberry as commissary general of the Commissariat of Our Lady of Good Counsel. This position put him in charge of all the Augustinian mission churches in the United States. The Augustinians transferred him from St. Augustine Parish in 1870 to St. Mary's Parish in Lawrence, Massachusetts.

=== President of Villanova ===
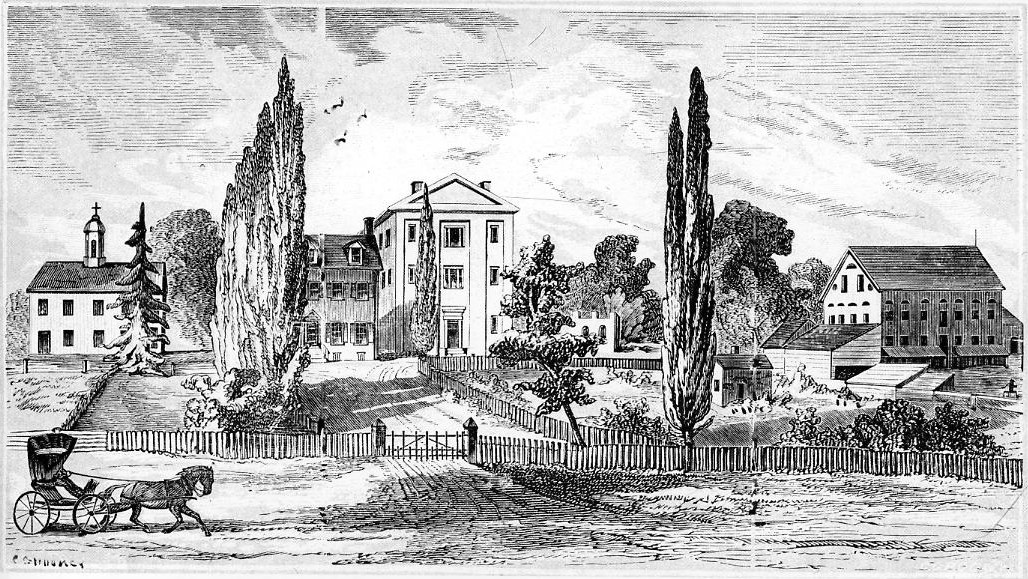
Villanova College, Villanova, Pennsylvania (1849)

After two years in Lawrence, Galberry in 1872 was appointed president of Villanova College. He erected the center and west wings of the college building and upgraded the course of studies.

When the Our Lady of Good Counsel Commissariat was converted into the Province of St. Thomas of Villanova in 1874, Galberry was elected provincial superior.

=== Bishop of Hartford ===
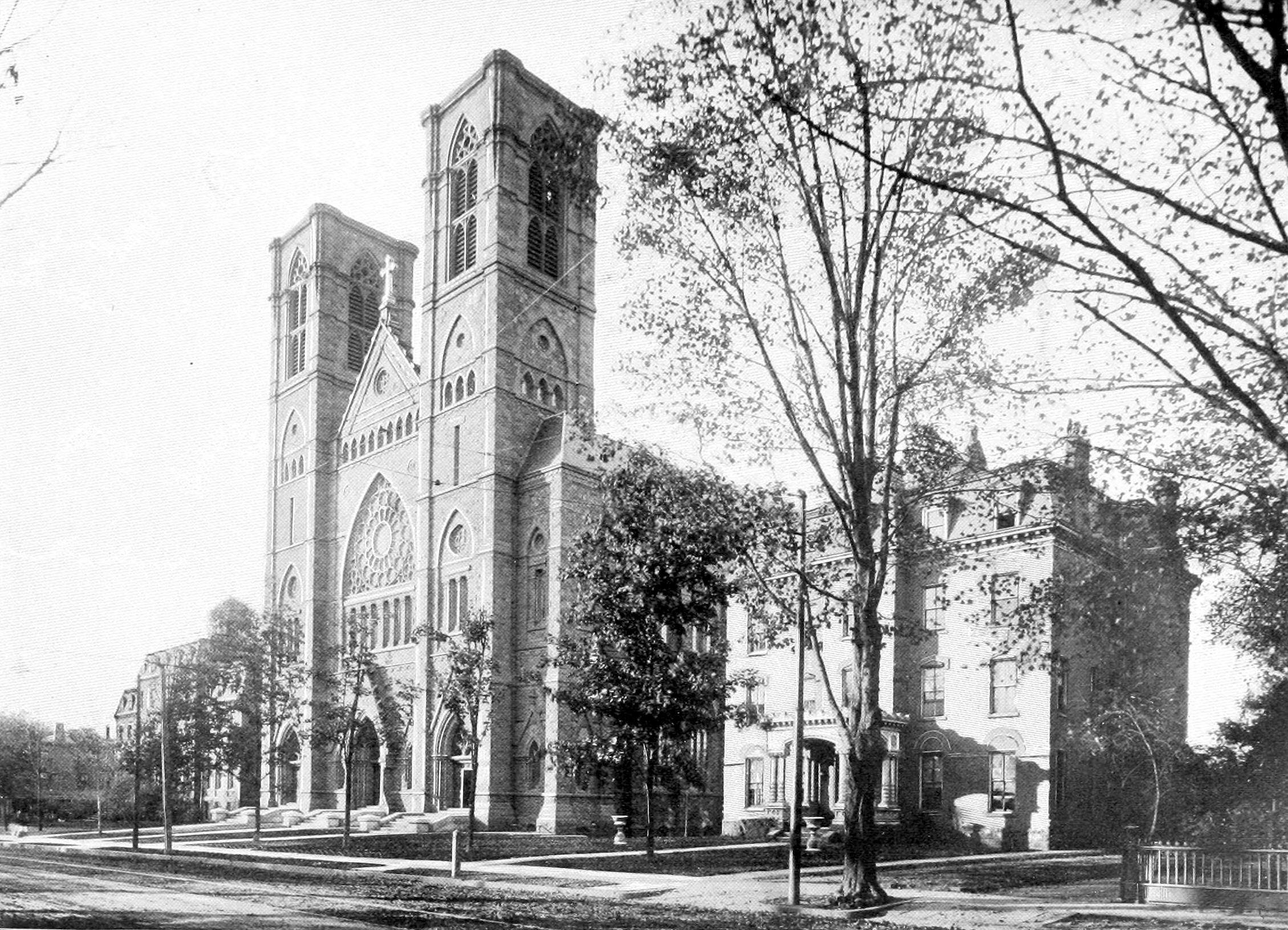
First Cathedral of St. Joseph, Hartford, Connecticut (1900). Destroyed by fire in 1958

On March 15, 1875, Galberry was appointed as the fourth bishop of Hartford by Pope Pius IX. However, he did not want to leave the Augustinians and Villanova; he declined the appointment in April 1875. However, Pius IX insisted that Garlway accept it.

Galberry immediately acquiesced to the pope and was consecrated as bishop on March 19, 1876, by Archbishop John Williams. Bishops Patrick O'Reilly and Edgar Wadhams serving as co-consecrators, at St. Peter's Church in Hartford.

At this time, the cathedral in Hartford, St. Joseph's was still being planned. Bishop McFarland had been using the chapel at the Sisters of Mercy convent as the pro-cathedral (temporary cathedral). McFarland designated St. Peter to serve as his pro-cathedral. He created a diocesan newspaper, The Connecticut Catholic and opened a new parish school for boys.

Galberry took his ad limina visit to the Vatican in 1876, visiting Catholic landmarks in Italy and France. He laid the cornerstone for the first Cathedral of St. Joseph in April 1877.

=== Death and legacy ===
Seeking a chance to rebuild his strength, Galberry left by train for Villanova College on October 10, 1878. Arriving in New York City later that day, he was suddenly stricken with a gastric haemorrhage. His companions brought Galway to the Grand Union Hotel in Midtown Manhattan and summoned a doctor. As Galberry's condition deteriorated, several of his Augustinian colleagues from Villanova rushed to his bedside.

Galway died in the Manhattan hotel the night of October 10; he was age 45. He was buried initially in the crypt of the first St. Joseph Cathedral in Hartford. When the cathedral was destroyed by fire in 1958, his remains, with those of other bishops, were re-interred in the Bishops' Plot at Mount Saint Benedict Cemetery in Bloomfield, Connecticut.

Catholic Church titles
Preceded by Francis Patrick McFarland	Bishop of Hartford; 1876–1878	Succeeded by Lawrence Stephen McMahon
