= Virgil Horace Barber =

The Reverend Virgil Horace Barber S.J.

Orders
- Ordination: December 1822

Personal details
- Born: May 9, 1782 Claremont, New Hampshire
- Died: March 25, 1847 (aged 64) Georgetown, District of Columbia
- Denomination: Catholic Church
- Education: Dartmouth College

Virgil Horace Barber (May 9, 1782, in Claremont, New Hampshire – March 25, 1847, in Georgetown, D.C.) was an American Jesuit.

== Life ==
Virgil Barber was born May 9, 1782, in Claremont, New Hampshire, where his father, Daniel Barber was an Episcopal priest. Virgil was educated at the Cheshire Academy, then went to Springfield, Vermont, to study surveying. In 1801 he entered Dartmouth College. Virgil was ordained an Episcopal priest and in 1807 became pastor of St. John's Episcopal Church in Waterbury, Connecticut. He then married Jerusha Booth of Vergennes, Vermont.

In 1814, Barber became principal of the Episcopalian Academy at Fairfield, New York. He said that the first step leading to his conversion to Catholicism was the reading of "A Novena to St. Francis Xavier", a book belonging to an Irish servant girl. This raised doubts concerning his Protestant faith, which his bishop, John H. Hobart, and other Episcopalian ministers could not solve for him. By this time, his father had begun to have some religious reservations and shared with Virgil some books he had been given by Roman Catholic Bishop of Boston, Jean-Louis Lefebvre de Cheverus.

During a visit to New York City, in 1816, he called on Benedict J. Fenwick, with the result that he resigned his Episcopalian charge at Fairfield, and went to New York, where he and his wife Jerusha were received into the Roman Catholic Church with their five children, Mary (born 1810); Abigail (born 1811); Susan (born 1813); Samuel (born 1814); and Josephine (born 1816). At first he opened a school in New York, but this lasted only seven months. Both he and his wife determined to enter religious life, he in the Society of Jesus, and she in the Visitation Order. Under the direction of Fenwick, in June 1817 they set out for Georgetown, D. C., where Barber and his son Samuel went to the college of the Jesuit Fathers. Jerusha entered the Georgetown Visitation Monastery, where the three oldest girls were received as boarding students. The youngest child, Josephine, then ten months old, was taken care of by Fenwick's mother.

The superior at Georgetown, John Grassi, shortly after sailed for Rome and took Barber with him as a novice. Barber remained there a year and then returned to Georgetown, where he continued his studies until December 1822, when he was ordained a priest at Boston. After his ordination he was sent to his old home, Claremont, New Hampshire, where in 1823, he built St. Mary's Church, the first Roman Catholic Church in the state. He laboured there for two years and then spent some time on the Indian missions in Maine, and was after recalled to Georgetown College, where he passed the remainder of his days.

Nearly three years after their separation, February 23, 1820, husband and wife met in the chapel of Georgetown Visitation Monastery to make their vows in religion. She first went through the formula of the profession of a Visitation nun, and he the vows of a member of the Society of Jesus. Their five children, the eldest being ten and the youngest three and a half years old, were present. Jerusha Barber had been admitted into the Visitation monastery on July 26, 1817, taking the name of Sister Mary Augustine. Her novitiate was one of severe trials, as well on account of her affection for her husband as on account of her children, who were a burden to the community then in a state of poverty. She served in the monastery of Georgetown, and the convents of Kaskaskia, St. Louis, and Mobile, where she died January 1, 1860.

Mary, the eldest daughter, entered the Ursuline convent, Mt. Benedict, near Charlestown, Massachusetts, as Sister Mary Benedicta, August 15, 1826, and died in the convent of the order in Quebec, May 9, 1844. Abigail, and Susan also became Ursulines at Canadian convents. Josephine became a Visitandine sister, like her mother. Abigail died in Quebec, December 8, 1879, and Susan in the convent at Three Rivers, Canada, January 24, 1837. Samuel, the son, graduated at Georgetown College in 1831 and immediately entered the Society of Jesus. After his novitiate he was sent to Rome, where he was ordained. He returned to Georgetown in 1840, and died, aged fifty years, at St. Thomas's Manor, Maryland on February 23, 1864.

== See also ==
- New Hampshire historical marker no. 41: First Roman Catholic Church
