= Holy Cross Parish, New Britain =

Coordinates: 41°40′58″N 72°47′17.8″W

Holy Cross Church
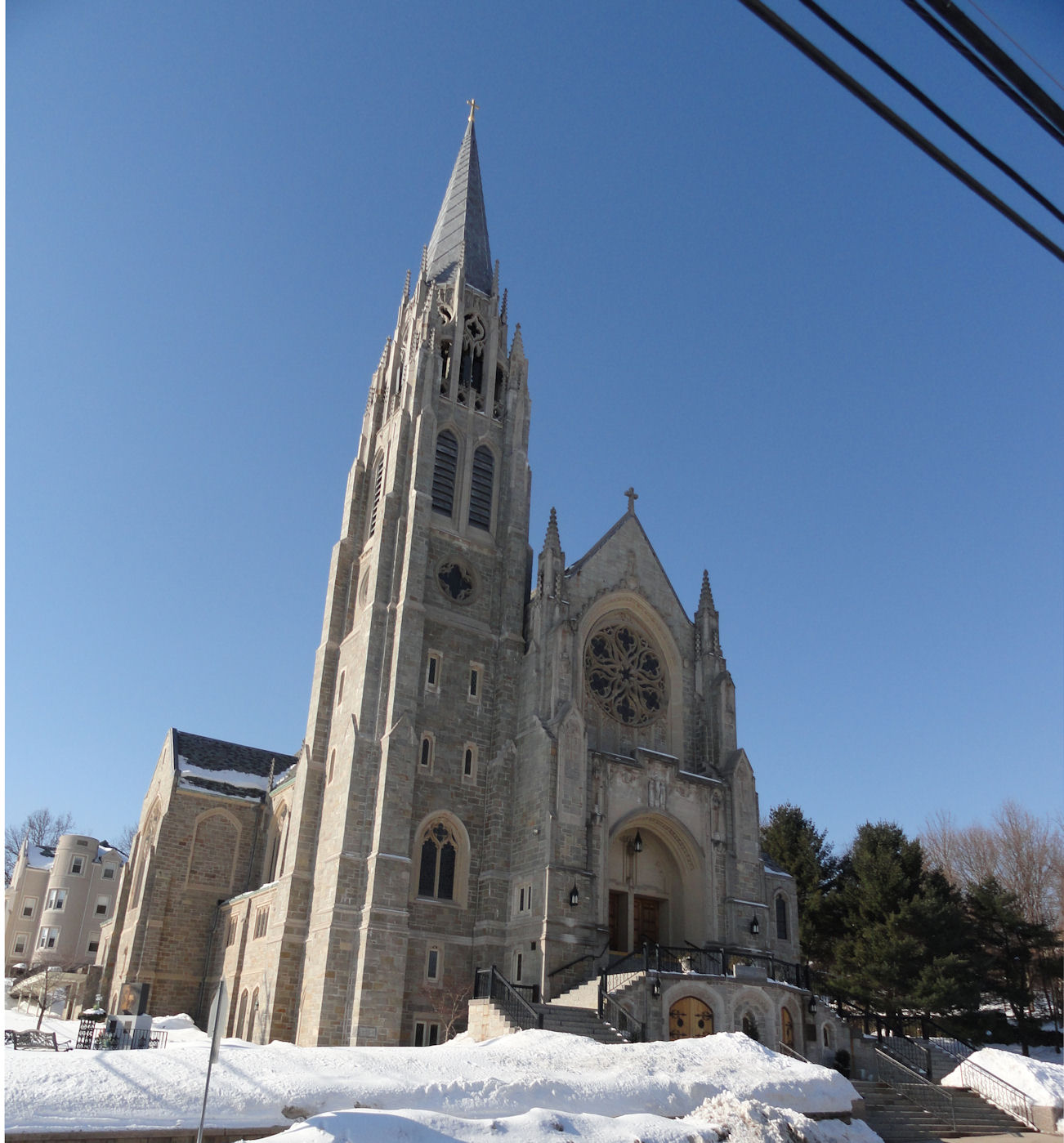
- Holy Cross Church
- Location: 31 Biruta Street; New Britain, Connecticut
- Country: United States
- Denomination: Roman Catholic
- Website: http://holycrosschurchnb.org/

History
- Founded: April 8, 1927
- Founder: Polish immigrants
- Dedication: Holy Cross
- Dedicated: July 11, 1927

Administration
- Province: Hartford
- Archdiocese: Hartford

Clergy
- Archbishop: Most Rev. Leonard Paul Blair, S.T.D. Emeritus: Most Rev. Henry Mansell, D.D.; Most Rev. Daniel A. Cronin, S.T.D.
- Bishop(s): Most Rev. Christie Macaluso, D.D. Emeritus: Most Rev. Peter A. Rosazza, D.D.
- Vicar: Rev. Sebastian Kos
- Pastor: Rev. Dariusz Gosciniak

Holy Cross Parish (Polish: Parafia Świętego Krzyża w New Britain) is a Roman Catholic parish located in New Britain, Connecticut, United States. Founded on April 8, 1927, it is in the Archdiocese of Hartford and is one of dozens of Polish-American Roman Catholic parishes in New England.

== History ==
Membership in New Britain's original Polish national parish, Sacred Heart, had risen to about 9000 when a movement for a second parish was sponsored by the Holy Trinity Society, founded on April 8, 1927. On November 3, 1927, Bishop John Joseph Nilan authorized Fr. Stephen Bartowski to organize what became Holy Cross Parish. The first Mass was offered on November 13 at a local hall. Fr. Bartkowski broke ground for a new church on Farmington Ave. on December 29, 1927. A year later, Fr. Bartkowski offered the first Mass in the new wooden church, which was dedicated on July 11, 1927 by Auxiliary Bishop Maurice F. McAuliffe. So many Poles soon crossed over from Sacred Heart that Bishop John Joseph Nilan recognized Holy Cross Parish as a national instead of a territorial parish, as originally planned.

The 1936 neo-Gothic church was designed by architect Anthony J. DePace of New York.

== Pipe organ ==
The church includes a Casavant Frères Pipe Organ (Opus 3650, 1988), situated at the back of the gallery under a large west-end rose window. The placement on the central axis allows an organ of modest proportions to fill a large building. Considerable tonal variety is available on the three manual divisions and pedal and includes appropriate divisional choruses that are balanced individually and are structured to work together in the ensemble of the instrument as a whole. The Trompette-en-Chamade is effective not only as the crowning glory for the ensemble but also in solo and dialogue roles. While this instrument speaks with a decidedly French accent, it has proven extremely effective in presenting the music of Bach and his contemporaries and in accompanying the singing of the congregation and choirs of the parish.

== Saint John Paul II School ==
In the year 1928, a new Polish parish was established on Farmington Avenue in the City of New Britain, Connecticut under the leadership of Rev. Stefan Bartkowski. The Most Rev. Maurice F. McAuliffe, Bishop of Hartford, dedicated Holy Cross Church on July 1, 1928. That same year, eight Sisters of St. Joseph, Third Order of St. Francis were asked to teach the Polish language and religion to the children of the newly founded parish after school hours. In the first two years 600 pupils enrolled. The efforts of the Sisters and the support of the Pastor laid the foundation for the present day parish school. The school was closed in 2015.
