= St. Mary Parish (Newington, Connecticut) =

St. Mary Church
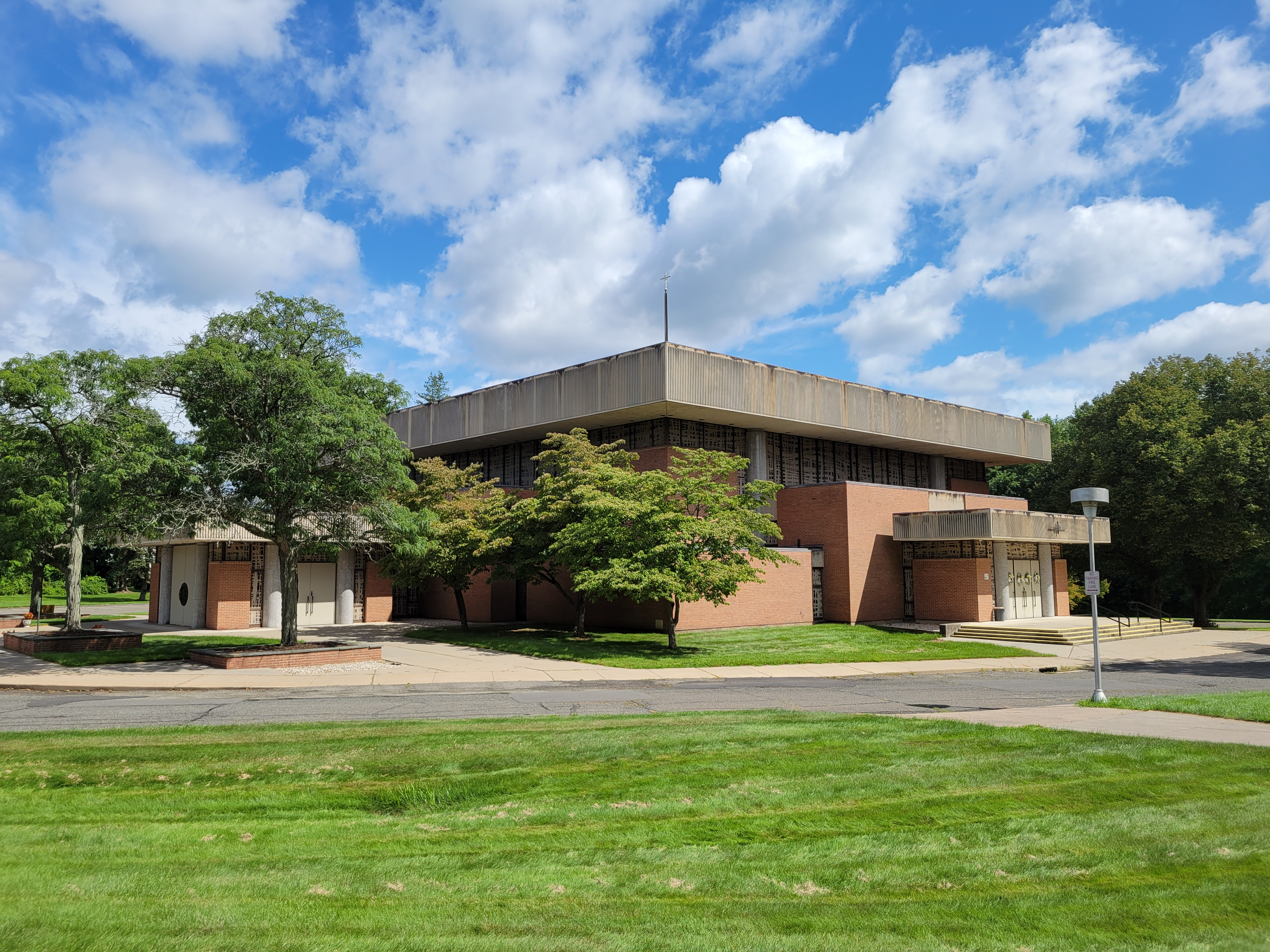
- Saint Mary Church
- St. Mary Church
- 41°41′59″N 72°43′59″W
- Location: 626 Willard Avenue; Newington, Connecticut
- Country: United States
- Denomination: Roman Catholic

History
- Founded: 1924

Administration
- Division: Vicariate: Hartford
- Province: Hartford
- Archdiocese: Hartford

Clergy
- Archbishop: Most Rev. Leonard P. Blair
- Pastor: Rev. Shawn Daly

St. Mary Church is a Roman Catholic church, part of Annunciation Parish, located in Newington, Connecticut. St. Mary School closed in 2016. A new pastor, Fr Shawn Daly was appointed in 2016 to oversee the restructuring of the new Annunciation Parish, combining St. Mary Church with Holy Spirit Church in Newington.

== History ==
St. Mary Parish began as a portable, one-story chapel mission of St. Brigid Parish in Elmwood. Constructed in just two days, the chapel was able to accommodate only 200 parishioners at once. The chapel's first mass was celebrated on June 6, 1920 by Reverend William F. Odell.

In 1924, Rev. Edward Shaughnessy, formerly a chaplain at Mount St. Joseph's Academy in Hartford, was assigned to the mission. Father Shaugnessy served the parish mission for six years until failing health forced him to retire in 1930.

Throughout the 1920s, the town of Newington reflected the nationwide migration of families from the cities to the suburbs. Over the decade, the town's population jumped by 65%, spurring a rapid growth of Catholicism and the need for more spiritual guidance closer to home than the parish church in Elmwood. The rising population as well as the construction of a large Veteran's Hospital in Newington pushed Bishop John Nilan of the then Diocese of Hartford to acquire a site on Willard Avenue for the construction of a new parish church. The new Georgian-style structure would accommodate 450 worshippers, doubling the capacity of the old chapel. It was designed by Whiton & McMahon and constructed by Joseph Clark under the supervision of Rev. Francis Nolan, pastor of St. Justin Parish in Hartford. Upon its completion, it was dedicated by Bishop Nilan on 20 November 1935.

The newly appointed pastor of the parish was to be Reverend George Clark, who began a number of ambitious construction plans upon being appointed in 1936. During his time as pastor, a new tower, choir loft, and bell tower were erected. Father Clark's crowning achievement was the construction of a nine-room convent in 1952. Just four years later, in December 1956, he died, yet he left Newington Catholics with their own parish church.

Following Father Clark as pastor was Reverend Joseph F. Buckley, who had been appointed on 3 September 1955. Father Buckley quickly realized that the population of his parish was continuing to grow rapidly. He attributed this growth to the shift from agricultural to industrial employment in Newington and its surrounding suburbs. Determined to meet the needs of the expanding population once and for all, Father Buckley began a $225,000 capital building fund campaign in October 1955. Just over two years later, in December 1957, the parish had raised over $300,000 which would fund the parish's ten-year construction plan.

First on Father Buckley's list of parish improvements were a parochial school and auditorium-gymnasium, both completed in 1958. The school could accommodate 450 students and was complete with ten classrooms, a library, a science room, and a medical room. In addition to the school, Father Buckley also oversaw the construction of a new convent of brick and limestone which would house the five Sisters of Notre Dame de Namur who would staff the newly constructed school. Both the school and the convent were dedicated on 2 November 1958 by Archbishop Henry J. O'Brien of the Archdiocese of Hartford. The school first opened in 1958 as a junior high school, serving 165 students in grades seven and eight. In addition, 1,800 children of the parish participated in public Catholic instruction classes. Continued expansion allowed the addition of the ninth grade in 1959 and the sixth grade in 1961 with the next lowest grades added each year thereafter. By 1966, St. Mary School served children in all nine grades.

Father Buckley next set his sights on a new rectory. The old rectory was first moved from Willard Avenue to a new site on Cedar Street, only to be replaced by a contemporary, two-story rectory in 1960. This rectory still serves the parish today and is complete with all the necessities of a contemporary parish.

The last structure to be erected was a new church, one which would once and for all meet the needs of the parish. In 1965, Father Buckley began the last and most ambitious undertaking of his ten-year construction plan for the new church, hiring the distinguished young architect Richar Quinn of Russell, Gibson, von Dohlen Architects, AIA. Just two years later, on 2 April 1967, the new church was dedicated by Archbishop Henry J. O'Brien, who laid the cornerstone and blessed the new structure at 11:30 a.m. surrounded by 1,200 worshipers. In addition to Father Buckley, the now prosperous parish was staffed by Father John O'Connor, Father Leslie Fogarty, Father Joseph Sheehan, Father Nicholas Cesaro, and Father Martin Scholsky, some on a part-time basis.

Father Buckley retired in 1970 due to his health, yet he had surely left his mark on the parish. What was once a tiny parish mission in 1920 had now grown into a full-fledged modern complex which would eventually encompass 26 acres and be valued at four million dollars — all in just over four decades.

Today, Annunciation Parish, comprising both St. Mary Church and Church of the Holy Spirit, serve nearly 4,000 registered families in Newington, Connecticut.

== Bibliography ==
- St. Mary's Church. South Hackensack, New Jersey: Custombook, Inc., Ecclesiastical Color Publishers. 1967.
