= Maurice F. McAuliffe =

American Catholic prelate (1875–1944)

His Excellency. The Most Reverend Maurice Francis McAuliffe
- Bishop of Hartford; Titular Bishop of Dercos
- In office: 1934 to 1944
- Predecessor: John Joseph Nilan
- Successor: Henry Joseph O'Brien
- Previous post: Auxiliary Bishop of Hartford (1926 to 1934)

Orders
- Ordination: July 29, 1900 by Franz Leopold von Leonrod
- Consecration: April 28, 1926 by John Joseph Nilan

Personal details
- Born: June 17, 1875 Hartford, Connecticut, US
- Died: December 14, 1944 (aged 69) Hartford
- Denomination: Roman Catholic
- Education: Mount St. Mary's College; Catholic University of Eichstätt-Ingolstadt
- Motto: In caritate Dei (In love of God)

Maurice Francis McAuliffe (June 17, 1875 – December 15, 1944) was an American Latin Catholic prelate of the Catholic Church. He served as the bishop of the Diocese of Hartford in Connecticut, U.S., from 1934 until his death in 1944. He previously served as an auxiliary bishop of the same diocese from 1926 to 1934.

== Biography ==
=== Early life ===
Maurice McAuliffe was born in Hartford, Connecticut, to Daniel and Catherine (née Noonan) McAuliffe. He graduated from St. Peter's School in Hartford and Hartford Public High School in 1894, and attended Mount St. Mary's College in Emmitsburg, Maryland, for a year. He then continued his studies at the Grand Seminary of Saint-Sulpice in Issy, France, and at the Catholic University of Eichstätt-Ingolstadt in Eichstätt, Germany.

=== Priesthood ===
McAuliffe was ordained to the priesthood in Eichstätt on July 29, 1900, by Bishop Franz Leopold von Leonrod. Following his return to Connecticut, McAuliffe was appointed to the faculty of St. Thomas Seminary in Hartford. He served as vice-president of the seminary from 1906 until 1921, when he was advanced to president. The Vatican elevated McAuliffe to the rank of domestic prelate in 1924.

=== Auxiliary Bishop of Hartford ===
On December 17, 1925, McAuliffe was appointed an auxiliary bishop of Hartford and titular bishop of Dercos by Pope Pius XI. He received his episcopal consecration on April 28, 1926, from John Joseph Nilan, with John Murray and William A. Hickey serving as co-consecrators, at St. Joseph's Cathedral in Hartford,. He selected as his episcopal motto: In Caritate Dei (Latin: "In Love of God").

=== Bishop of Hartford ===
Following the death of Nilan, Pius XI named McAuliffe as the eighth bishop of Hartford on April 23, 1934. During his ten-year-long tenure, he established 25 parishes, nine parochial schools, and several junior high schools. In 1942, McAuliffe invited the Jesuits to found Fairfield College Preparatory School in Fairfield, Connecticut, now part of the Diocese of Bridgeport. He organized the campaign to raise $1 million for improvements to St. Francis Hospital in Hartford. McAuliffe was a supporter of the Legion of Decency.

=== Death and legacy ===
McAuliffe was admitted to St. Francis Hospital on December 3, 1944, and placed in an oxygen tent. He later died at age 69.

McAuliffe Hall on the campus of Fairfield University is named in his honor. The Knight of Columbus Council 3181 – Bishop Maurice F. McAuliffe in Windsor, Connecticut is also named in his honor.

Catholic Church titles
Preceded by John Joseph Nilan	Bishop of Hartford; 1934–1944	Succeeded by Archbishop Henry Joseph O'Brien
