= Helen M. Feeney =

American nun

Helen Margaret Feeney
- Born: Mary Louise Feeney; September 7, 1919; Stamford, Connecticut, US
- Died: November 16, 2004 (aged 85); West Hartford, Connecticut
- Education: Sacred Heart Academy
- Alma mater: Diocesan Sisters College (BA); Boston College (MEd)
- Occupation(s): Nun, ecclesiastical administrator
- Employer: Archdiocese of Hartford
- Title: Chancellor
- Term: 1986–1994
- Awards: Pro Ecclesia et Pontifice

Helen Margaret Feeney (1919–2004) was an American ecclesiastical administrator and member of the Sisters of St. Joseph who served as the first woman chancellor of the Roman Catholic Archdiocese of Hartford (1986–1994). She was only the fifth woman to serve as chancellor of a US archdiocese. Feeney was named to the Connecticut Women's Hall of Fame in 1995.

== Early life and education ==
Feeney was born Mary Louise Feeney in Stamford, Connecticut, to parents William and Helen (Steblar) Feeney. She attended Sacred Heart Academy and entered the Sisters of Saint Joseph Convent in West Hartford, Connecticut, in 1937, professing her perpetual vows in 1943 and legally becoming Sister Helen Margaret. She received her bachelor's degree from the Diocesan Sisters College, a master's degree in education with a specialization in reading from Boston College, and a sixth-year certificate in professional education and administration from the University of Connecticut.

Feeney taught in Catholic schools across Connecticut for many years. She was principal of St. James School in Danielson from 1972 to 1974, coordinator of elementary schools in the greater Waterbury area from 1974 to 1978, and assistant superintendent of elementary schools for the Archdiocese of Hartford from 1978 to 1986.

== Career and service ==
In 1986, Archbishop John Francis Whealon appointed Feeney as the first woman Chancellor of the Archdiocese, the highest position in the Roman Catholic Church open to women. As chancellor, Feeney was the archdiocese's chief administrator, responsible for contracts, salaries, personnel, buildings, and documents. She modernized the chancery building and offices, overseeing the introduction of computers and the construction of a new visitor entrance. She also instituted the archdiocese's first archives. Daniel Cronin appointed her as his "delegate for special needs" after she stepped down as chancellor. She was succeeded by Daniel J. Plocharczyk, a priest.

Feeney served on the boards of various organizations, including St. Agnes Home for young women, Saint Francis Hospital, Catholic Charities, and Catholic Family Services. She held various offices, including director of the Archdiocesan Mission Co-op and director of the Archdiocesan Office for Religious. She was awarded the Pro Ecclesia et Pontifice by Pope John Paul II in 1993 and the Distinguished Catholic Women's Award in 1994. She was inducted into the Connecticut Women's Hall of Fame in 1995.

== Personal life ==
Feeney died at the Sisters of Saint Joseph Healthcare Center in West Hartford on November 16, 2004.
