= Christie Macaluso =

American prelate of the Catholic Church (born 1945)

His Excellency, The Most Reverend Christie Albert Macaluso
- Auxiliary Bishop Emeritus of Hartford
- Church: Catholic
- Archdiocese: Hartford
- Appointed: March 18, 1997
- Installed: June 10, 1997
- Retired: December 15, 2017
- Other posts: Auxiliary Bishop Emeritus of Hartford (2017–pres.); Titular Bishop of Grass Valley (1997–pres.)

Orders
- Ordination: May 22, 1971 by John Francis Whealon
- Consecration: June 10, 1997 by Daniel Anthony Cronin, Paul Loverde, and Peter A. Rosazza

Personal details
- Born: June 12, 1945 (age 81) Hartford, Connecticut, U.S.
- Education: St. Thomas Seminary; St. Mary's Seminary; Trinity College; New York University
- Motto: Veritas liberabit vos; (The truth will set you free)

Styles of Christie Albert Macaluso
- Reference style: His Excellency; The Most Reverend
- Spoken style: Your Excellency
- Religious style: Bishop

Christie Albert Macaluso (born June 12, 1945) is an American Catholic prelate who served as auxiliary bishop of the Archdiocese of Hartford in Connecticut from 1997 to 2017.

== Biography ==
=== Early life and education ===
Christie Macaluso was born on June 12, 1945, in Hartford, Connecticut, to Albert Carl and Helen (née Meaney) Macaluso; his father's family was from Palermo, Sicily, and his mother was of Irish descent.

Macaluso studied at St. Thomas Seminary in Bloomfield, Connecticut, and St. Mary's Seminary in Baltimore, Maryland, obtaining a Bachelor of Philosophy degree and a Master of Sacred Theology degree.He also holds a Master of Philosophy degree from Trinity College, and a Master of Psychology degree from New York University.

=== Priesthood ===
Macaluso was ordained to the priesthood for the Archdiocese of Hartford by Archbishop John Francis Whealon on May 22, 1971. After his ordination, Macaluso served as assistant pastor at St. Thomas the Apostle Parish in West Hartford, Connecticut, and at St. Joseph Parish in New Britain, Connecticut.

Macaluso later became a professor of philosophy at St. Thomas Seminary. In 1980, he was appointed dean of the seminary and rector in 1985. While serving as rector, Macaluso was also assigned as a weekend assistant pastor at St. Francis Parish in Torrington, Connecticut, and Sacred Heart Parish in Bloomfield, Connecticut.

In 1991, Macaluso was named pastor of the Cathedral of St. Joseph Parish in Hartford. He was also appointed as episcopal vicar for the Hartford Vicariate in 1995. Macaluso was raised by the Vatican to the rank of honorary prelate in 1995.

=== Auxiliary Bishop of Hartford ===
On March 18, 1997, Pope John Paul II appointed Macaluso as an auxiliary bishop of Hartford and titular bishop of Grass Valley. He was consecrated on June 10, 1997, by Archbishop Daniel Cronin, with bishops Paul Loverde and Peter A. Rosazza serving as co-consecrators. Macaluso selected as his episcopal motto: "Veritas Liberabit Vos", meaning "The Truth Will Set You Free" (John 8:32).

As an auxiliary bishop, Macaluso served as vicar general of the archdiocese and moderator of the curia.

Pope Francis accepted Macaluso's letter of resignation as auxiliary bishop of Hartford on December 15, 2017. In retirement, he serves as auxiliary bishop emeritus of Hartford.

== See also ==
- Catholic Church hierarchy
- Catholic Church in the United States
- Historical list of the Catholic bishops of the United States
- List of Catholic bishops of the United States
- Lists of patriarchs, archbishops, and bishops

== Episcopal succession ==
Catholic Church titles
Preceded by Peter A. Rosazza	Auxiliary Bishop of Hartford; 1997–2017	Succeeded by Juan Miguel Betancourt
