= Joseph Francis Donnelly =

American Catholic bishop

Joseph F. Donnelly
- Auxiliary Bishop of Hartford
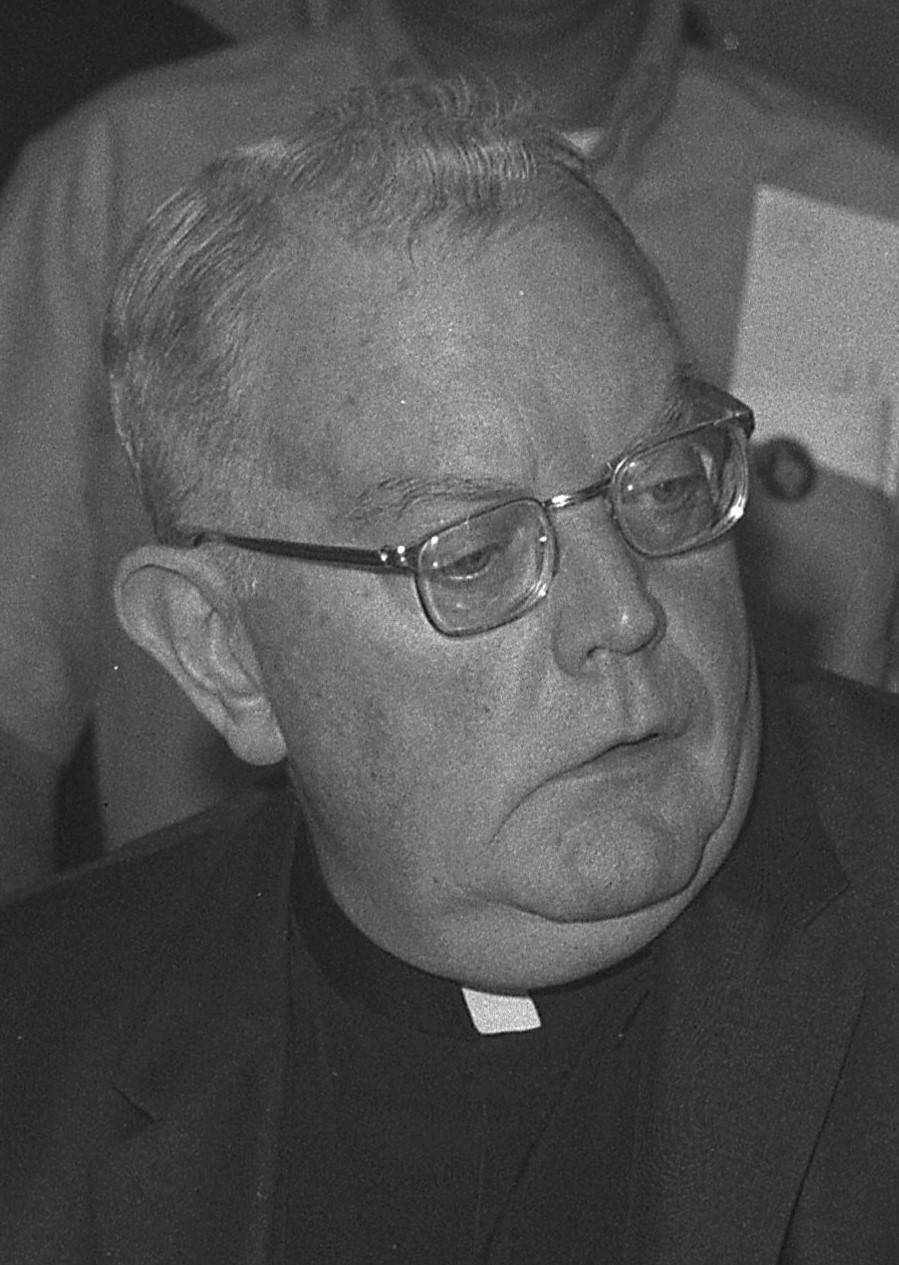
- Donnelly in 1970
- Church: Catholic Church
- See: Titular Bishop of Nabala
- Appointed: November 9, 1964
- In office: January 28, 1965 – June 30, 1977

Orders
- Ordination: June 29, 1934
- Consecration: January 28, 1965 by Henry Joseph O'Brien

Personal details
- Born: May 1, 1909 Norwich, Connecticut, United States
- Died: June 30, 1977 (aged 68) New Haven, Connecticut, United States
- Motto: Opus Justitiae Pax (Peace is the Work of Justice)

Joseph Francis Donnelly (May 1, 1909 – June 30, 1977) was a bishop of the Catholic Church in the United States. He served as Auxiliary Bishop of the Archdiocese of Hartford from 1965 to 1977.

== Biography ==
Born in Norwich, Connecticut, Donnelly was ordained a priest on June 29, 1934, for the Diocese of Hartford. On November 9, 1964 Pope Paul VI appointed him as the Titular Bishop of Nabala and Auxiliary Bishop of Hartford. He was consecrated a bishop by Henry O'Brien, Archbishop of Hartford, on January 28, 1965. The principal co-consecrators were Vincent Hines, Bishop of Norwich, and John Hackett, Auxiliary Bishop of Hartford. Donnelly was an ardent supporter of farm laborers and served as the chairman of the Bishop's Committee on Farm Labor. He also spent 20 years on the Connecticut Board of Mediation and Arbitration with fifteen of those years as its chairman. He served as Hartford's auxiliary bishop until his death on June 30, 1977, at the age of 68.

Catholic Church titles
New title	Auxiliary Bishop of Hartford; 1965–1977	Succeeded by John Gregory Murray
