= Juan Miguel Betancourt =

Latin Catholic auxiliary bishop

His Excellency, The Most Reverend Juan Miguel Betancourt S.E.M.V.
- Auxiliary Bishop of Hartford; Titular Bishop of Curzola
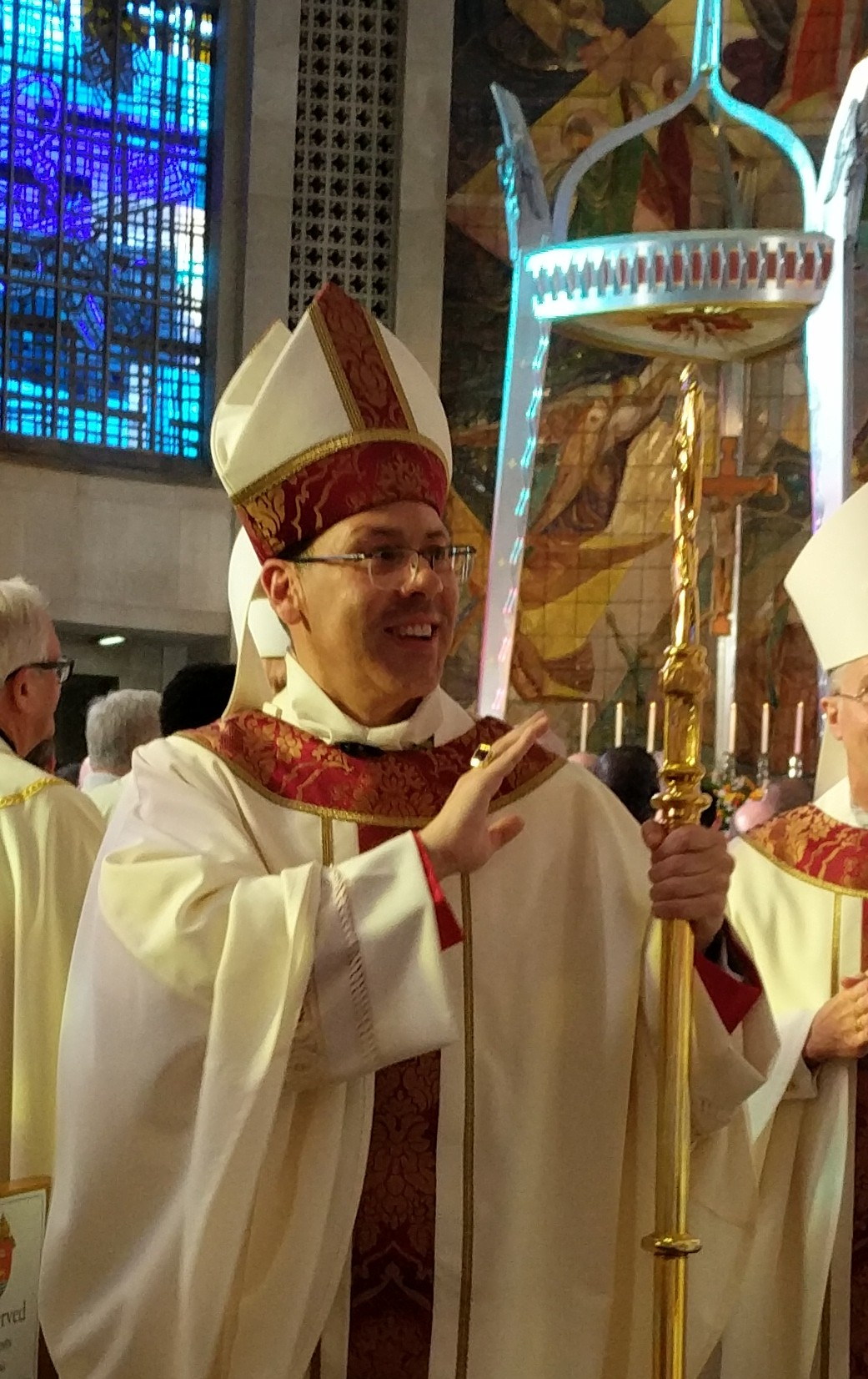
- Archdiocese: Hartford
- Appointed: September 18, 2018
- Installed: October 18, 2018
- Other post: Titular Bishop of Curzola

Orders
- Ordination: April 21, 2001 by Iñaki Mallona Txertudi
- Consecration: October 18, 2018 by Leonard Paul Blair, Timothy Broglio, and Andrew H. Cozzens

Personal details
- Born: Juan Miguel Betancourt Torres; June 1, 1970 (age 56) Ponce, Puerto Rico, US
- Denomination: Catholic Church
- Education: University of Puerto Rico; Pontifical Catholic University of Puerto Rico; Pontifical Biblical Institute
- Motto: Ecce agnus Dei (Behold the Lamb of God)

Styles of Juan Miguel Betancourt
- Reference style: His Excellency; The Most Reverend
- Spoken style: Your Excellency
- Religious style: Bishop

Juan Miguel Betancourt, S.E.M.V. (born June 1, 1970, in Ponce, Puerto Rico) is an American prelate of the Catholic Church who has been serving as an auxiliary bishop for the Archdiocese of Hartford in Connecticut since 2018.

== Biography ==
=== Early life ===
Juan Miguel Betancourt was born in Ponce, Puerto Rico on June 1, 1970, to Miguel and Gloria Betancourt. He is the oldest of three children. Betancourt joined the Society of the Servants of the Eucharist and Mary on January 1, 1992, and took perpetual vows to the order on August 6, 2000.

Betancourt graduated with a Bachelor of Natural Sciences degree from the University of Puerto Rico and received a Master of Divinity degree from the Pontifical Catholic University of Puerto Rico in Ponce.

=== Priesthood ===
On April 21, 2001, Betancourt was ordained a priest in Puerto Rico by Bishop Iñaki Mallona Txertudi for the Servants of the Eucharist and Mary(Esclavos de la Eucaristia y de Maria Virgen). Following his ordination, Betancourt went to Rome to study at the Pontifical Biblical Institute, earning a Licentiate in Sacred Scripture in 2005. After returning to Puerto Rico, he taught at the Pontifical Catholic University of Puerto Rico and the Regina Cleri Major Seminary, both in Ponce, for one year.

In 2006, Betancourt was assigned by his order to be the pastor of St. Francis de Sales Parish in the Archdiocese of Saint Paul and Minneapolis in Minnesota. He also served as a professor of sacred scripture at the Saint Paul Seminary School of Divinity in St. Paul, Minnesota and as a vice rector of formation and associate academic dean from 2006 until 2018. He taught undergraduate theology at the University of St. Thomas in Minnesota from 2006 through 2009.

=== Episcopacy ===
On September 18, 2018, Pope Francis appointed Betancourt as titular bishop of Curzola and auxiliary bishop of the Archdiocese of Hartford. He was consecrated on October 18, 2018, at the Cathedral of St. Joseph in Hartford by Archbishop Leonard Blair, with Archbishop Timothy Broglio and Bishop Andrew H. Cozzens as co-consecrators.

Betancourt serves on the Committee on Doctrine, the Clergy, the Consecrated Life and Vocations Committee, and the Subcommittee on Divine Worship in Spanish for the United States Conference of Catholic Bishops. He is also the Chair of the Subcommittee on the Translation of Scripture for the Conference.

In January 2026, he accepted the appointment to serve as the USCCB Bishop Liaison for the next Synod on Synodality and is the Chair of the USCCB Synod Implementation and Evaluation Task Force. The Synod will take place during the Vatican assembly in October 2028.

Betancourt has been a member of the Trinity Health of New England Board of Directors since 2019.

On October 11, 2025, Bishop Betancourt was admitted to the Equestrian Order of the Holy Sepulchre of Jerusalem-Eastern Lieutenancy with the rank of Knight Commander of the Holy Sepulchre with Star. The investiture ceremony took place at St Patrick's Cathedral, New York. He serves as one of the chaplains in the Connecticut Section of the Eastern Lieutenancy.

== See also ==
- Catholic Church hierarchy
- Catholic Church in the United States
- Historical list of the Catholic bishops of the United States
- List of Catholic bishops of the United States
- Lists of patriarchs, archbishops, and bishops

Catholic Church titles
Preceded by Christie Macaluso	Auxiliary Bishop of Hartford; 2018-Present	Succeeded by -
