= The Catholic Transcript =

American magazine

- Cover of the June 2020 issue
- Type: Monthly magazine
- Owner(s): Archdiocese of Hartford
- Publisher: Archbishop Leonard Paul Blair
- Founded: June 1898
- Headquarters: 467 Bloomfield Ave. Bloomfield, CT 06002-2999
- Circulation: 80,000
- ISSN: 1081-4353

The Catholic Transcript is a monthly magazine of the Roman Catholic Archdiocese of Hartford, Connecticut, serving Hartford, New Haven and Litchfield Counties. It is the largest catholic newspaper in Connecticut.

== History ==
The Catholic Transcript traces its roots to April 1896, when the Diocese of Hartford purchased the Connecticut Catholic Publishing Company. The Connecticut Catholic became the official weekly newspaper of the Diocese of Hartford. In April 1898, the name of the newspaper was changed from The Connecticut Catholic to The Catholic Transcript. It was first published by that name on June 17, 1898, as a weekly paper. It remained a weekly until October 25, 1996. As demand declined, The Catholic Transcript became a monthly paper, and since December 1996, it has been published on a monthly basis.

From the start, The Catholic Transcript operated with the full support of the Bishop of the Archdiocese of Hartford, Michael A. Tierney, and continues so to this day under Archbishop Leonard Paul Blair. In the July 1, 1898, issue, Bishop Tierney wrote, "I hereby approve of the Catholic Transcript and cordially recommend it to the clergy and faithful of the Diocese."
