= WJMJ =

Hartford, Connecticut; United States
- Broadcast area: Greater Hartford
- Frequency: 88.9 MHz (HD Radio)
- Branding: WJMJ Catholic Radio

Programming
- Format: Soft adult contemporary, soft oldies, and Catholic talk and teaching
- Subchannels: HD2: EWTN Spanish-language Catholic radio; HD3: EWTN English-language Catholic radio
- Affiliations: ABC News Radio; EWTN Radio

Ownership
- Owner: Roman Catholic Archdiocese of Hartford; (St. Thomas Seminary)

History
- First air date: December 24, 1976; 49 years ago
- Call sign meaning: Jesus, Mary, and Joseph

Technical information
- Licensing authority: FCC
- Facility ID: 62175
- Class: B
- ERP: 2,300 watts
- HAAT: 436 meters (1,430 ft)
- Transmitter coordinates: 41°42′13.4″N 72°49′55.4″W
- Translators: 93.1 W226AG (Hamden); 107.1 W296AO (New Haven)
- Repeater: 91.1 WSHU-HD3 (Fairfield)

Links
- Public license information: Public file; LMS
- Website: www.ortv.org/WJMJ/wjmj.htm

WJMJ (88.9 FM) is a non-profit, non-commercial, radio station licensed to Hartford, Connecticut. It is owned by St. Thomas Seminary in Bloomfield, Connecticut, which is owned by the Archdiocese of Hartford. Its transmitter tower is atop Johnnycake Mountain in Burlington, Connecticut. The station has an effective radiated power (ERP) of 2,300 watts. For its programming to be heard in other parts of Connecticut, WJMJ has FM translators on 107.1 in New Haven and 93.1 in Hamden. It is also heard on a digital subchannel of 91.1 WSHU-FM-HD3 in Fairfield, Connecticut.

The "JMJ" in the call sign stands for Jesus, Mary, and Joseph. Its daytime programming consists of "music you can't hear anywhere else", including soft adult contemporary and soft oldies, hosted by local disc jockeys. Nighttime and Sunday specialty programs feature classical music, adult standards, and Roman Catholic talk and teaching shows.

== History ==
In the 1970s, Archbishop John F. Whealon decided to start a radio station as a way to bring the Gospel to a wider audience through a format of inspiring messages and pleasant music. WJMJ says it is the first archdiocesan-operated radio station in the United States, signing on the air on December 24, 1976. The WJMJ radio studios were originally in Glastonbury, Connecticut. They moved to Bloomfield in the early 1980s. A fire tower originally stood where the WJMJ radio tower is located.

In 2009, the WJMJ studios were moved to Prospect, Connecticut, which also houses the Office of Radio and Television of the Archdiocese of Hartford. In 2018, WJMJ began broadcasting from a new tower at 1,430 feet (440 meters) in height above average terrain (HAAT). That gives the station a signal covering most of Central Connecticut and reaching part of Western Massachusetts.

"Festival of Faith", the 14-hour block of radio shows on Sunday which included recorded worship services and talk shows produced by an assortment of area Protestant and Eastern Orthodox churches was discontinued in May 2008. On Sunday, June 1, 2008, WJMJ began airing local Catholic programming, as well as material from the EWTN network. WJMJ also carries live Metropolitan Opera broadcasts on Saturday afternoons.

After many years of monaural broadcasting, FM stereo broadcasts began in January 2009.

== Translators ==
Call sign	Frequency	City of license	FID	ERP (W)	HAAT	Class	FCC info
W226AG	93.1 FM	Hamden, Connecticut	58602	10	140 m (459 ft)	D	LMS
W296AO	107.1 FM	New Haven, Connecticut	62174	3	101 m (331 ft)	D	LMS
