= Francis Patrick Keough =

American prelate

His Excellency, The Most Reverend Francis Patrick Keough
- Archbishop of Baltimore
- See: Archdiocese of Baltimore
- Appointed: November 29, 1947
- Installed: February 24, 1948
- Term ended: December 8, 1961
- Predecessor: Michael Joseph Curley
- Successor: Lawrence Shehan
- Previous post: Bishop of Providence (1934-1947)

Orders
- Ordination: June 10, 1916 by John Joseph Nilan
- Consecration: May 22, 1934 by Amleto Giovanni Cicognani

Personal details
- Born: December 30, 1890 New Britain, Connecticut, US
- Died: December 8, 1961 (aged 70) Baltimore, Maryland, US
- Denomination: Roman Catholic Church
- Education: St. Thomas Seminary; Grand Seminary of Saint-Sulpice; St. Bernard's Seminary
- Motto: Maria spes nostra (Mary, our hope)
- Coat of arms: Francis Patrick Keough's coat of arms

Styles of Francis Patrick Keough
- Reference style: His Excellency; The Most Reverend
- Spoken style: Your Excellency
- Religious style: Bishop

Francis Patrick Keough (December 30, 1890 – December 8, 1961) was an American prelate of the Roman Catholic Church. He served as bishop of the Diocese of Providence in Rhode Island from 1934 to 1947 and as archbishop of the Archdiocese of Baltimore in Maryland from 1947 until his death.

== Biography ==
=== Early life ===
Francis Keough was born on December 30, 1890, in New Britain, Connecticut, the second and youngest son of Patrick and Margaret (née Ryan) Keough. His parents were Irish immigrants, and his father died when Francis was only five years old. He received his early education at the parochial school of St. Mary's Church in New Britain, and began his studies for the priesthood at St. Thomas Seminary in Bloomfield, Connecticut.

In 1911, Keough went to study the Grand Seminary of Saint-Sulpice in Issy-les-Moulineaux, France. However, he was forced to return home in 1913 following the outbreak of World War I in Europe. Keough then completed his theological studies at St. Bernard's Seminary in Rochester, New York.

=== Priesthood ===
On June 10, 1916, Keough was ordained a priest in Hartford, Connecticut, for the Diocese of Hartford by Bishop John Nilan. After his ordination, the diocese assigned Keough as a curate at St. Rose Parish in Meriden, Connecticut. He remained at St. Rose until Nilan appointed him three years later as his private secretary in 1919.

During the next 15 years, Keough served as the diocesan director of the Society for the Propagation of the Faith, as assistant chancellor of the diocese, and as chaplain of two institutions.

=== Bishop of Providence ===
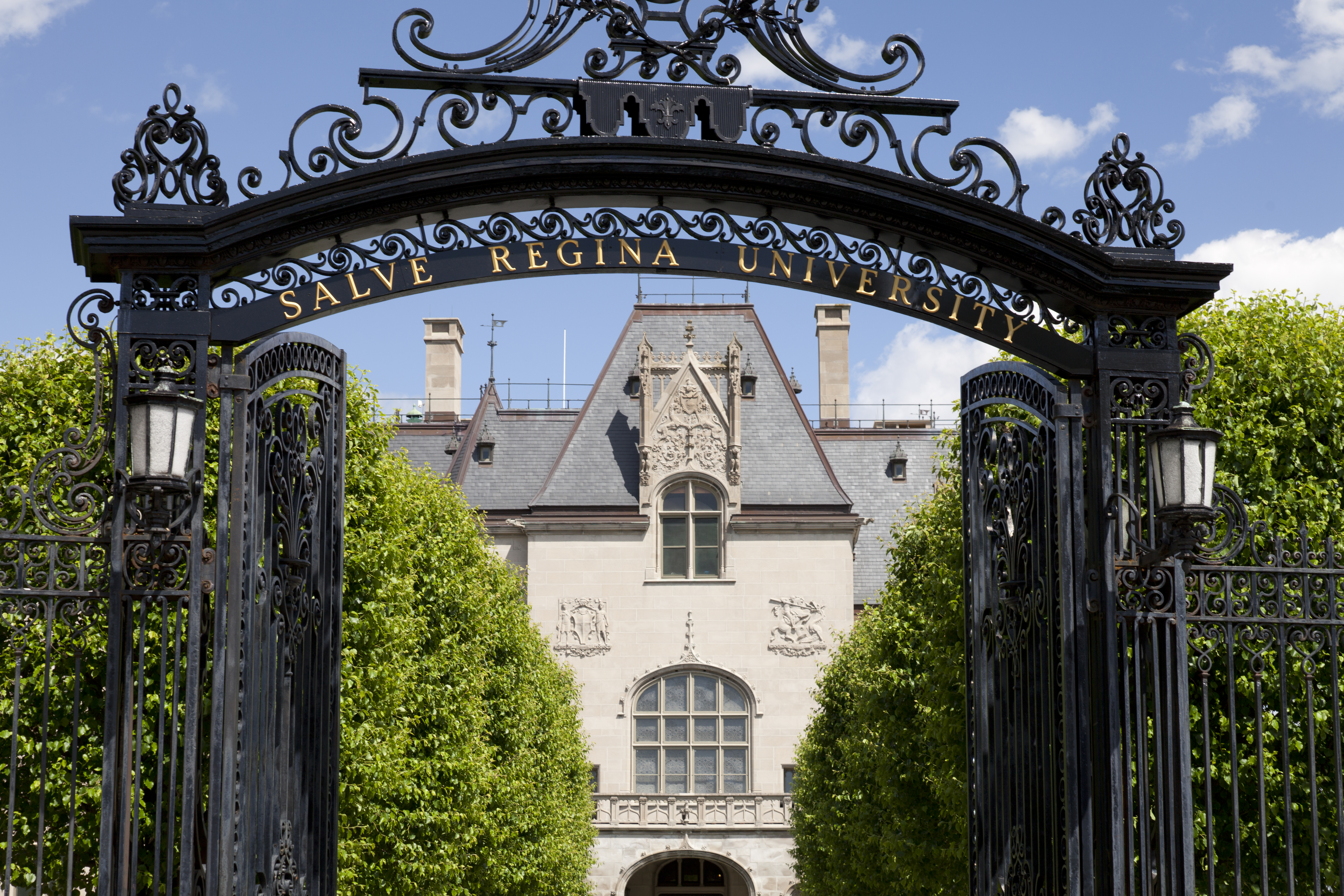
Salve Regina College, Newport, Rhode Island (2016)

On February 10, 1934, Keough was appointed the fourth bishop of Providence by Pope Pius XI. He received his episcopal consecration at the Cathedral of Saints Peter and Paul in Providence, Rhode Island, on May 22, 1934, from Archbishop Amleto Cicognani, with Archbishop John Murray and Bishop James Cassidy serving as co-consecrators.

During Keough's tenure in Providence, the Catholic population of the diocese increased from 325,000 to 425,000, and the number of clergy grew by fifty percent. To meet the needs of this booming population, he erected 15 new parishes and built four high schools.

One of Keogh's goals in Providence was to establish a minor seminary to provide a high school and early college education to young men entering the priesthood. The 1938 New England hurricane caused severe damage along the Rhode Island coastline, prompting the owner of one heavily damaged mansion in Warwick Neck to donate it to the diocese. After renovating the mansion, Keough opened Our Lady of Providence Seminary there in 1939. He worked to ease tensions between the French- and English-speaking members of his congregation, and reduced the heavy financial debts burdening the diocese.

In 1942, during World War II, Keough delivered the blessing at the launching of the SS William Coddington. It was the first Liberty ship constructed in the shipyards in the Field's Point section of Providence. After the war, Keough worked strenuously to increase contributions to Catholic Charities in the diocese. These donations rose from $263,000 in 1933 to over $1 million by 1948.

In 1947, Keough worked with the Sisters of Mercy to open Salve Regina College in a former mansion in Newport, Rhode Island, the first college for Catholic women in the diocese.

=== Archbishop of Baltimore ===
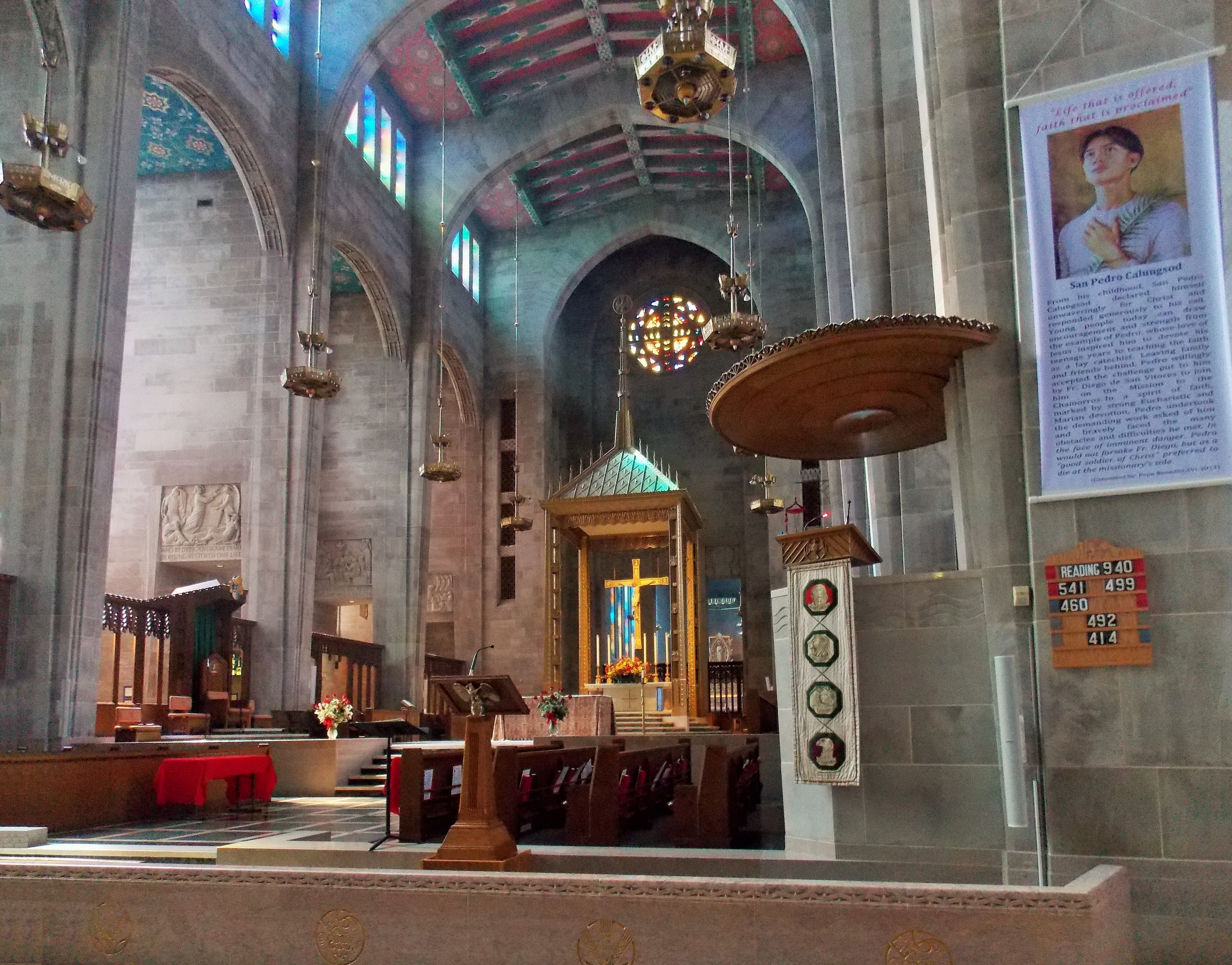
Cathedral of Mary Our Queen, Baltimore, Maryland (2014)

On November 29, 1947, Keough was named by Pope Pius XII as the eleventh archbishop of Baltimore. He was installed in the Basilica of the National Shrine of the Assumption in Baltimore on February 24, 1948. During Keough's 14 years in Baltimore, the Catholic population of the archdiocese grew from 265,000 to 400,000. He erected 18 parishes in the growing suburbs and outskirts of Baltimore. He himself moved out of Baltimore to a Long Crandon, an estate in Timonium, Maryland.

Like other Catholic bishops of the early Cold War era, Keough was a strong foe of Soviet communism. He supported the founding of the Maryland Action Guild, an anti-communist organization. At a commencement address at the University of Notre Dame in 1950, he warned that 2000 years of Christianity was "...crumbling before the juggernaut of communism."

Keough broke ground in 1954 for the Cathedral of Mary Our Queen in Baltimore, which was consecrated five years later in 1959. He also built many new schools, homes, orphanages and other institutions. In 1956, Keough banned Catholics in the archdiocese from viewing the 1956 film Baby Doll, ostensibly because of its sexual themes.

Keough served as a trustee of the Catholic University of America in Washington, D.C., and as a member of the American Board of Catholic Missions. He served three terms as chair of the National Catholic Welfare Conference. Keough was known as the "Archbishop of the poor" due to his dedication to orphans and the aged. He played a key role in the 1958 publication of Discrimination and Catholic Conscience, a joint statement by the United States Catholic Conference and the National Conference of Catholic Bishops condemning racial discrimination in the United States.

The Vatican named him as an assistant to the papal throne in 1959. That same year, he was the commencement speaker at Mount St. Mary College in Emmitsburg, Maryland. He called for a "crusade of prayer" during the 1959 state visit of Soviet Premier Nikita Khrushchev to the United States.

=== Death and legacy ===
Francis Keough died in Baltimore from a cerebral thrombosis on December 8, 1961, at age 70.

- Bishop Keough Regional High School in Pawtucket, Rhode, opened in 1971 and closed in 2015.
- Seton Keough High School in Baltimore opened in 1988 with the merger of Archbishop Keough High School and Seton High School. It closed in 2017.

== See also ==
- Catholic Church hierarchy
- Catholic Church in the United States
- Historical list of the Catholic bishops of the United States
- List of Catholic bishops of the United States
- Lists of patriarchs, archbishops, and bishops

== Episcopal succession ==
Catholic Church titles
Preceded by William A. Hickey	Bishop of Providence; 1934–1947	Succeeded by Russell J. McVinney
Preceded by Michael Joseph Curley	Archbishop of Baltimore; 1947–1961	Succeeded by Lawrence Shehan
