= Peter A. Rosazza =

American prelate

His Excellency, The Most Reverend Peter Anthony Rosazza
- Auxiliary Bishop Emeritus of Hartford; Titular Bishop of Oppidum Novum
- Archdiocese: Hartford
- Appointed: February 28, 1978
- Installed: June 24, 1978
- Retired: June 30, 2010
- Other post: Titular Bishop of Oppidum Novum

Orders
- Ordination: June 29, 1961 by Pierre Brot
- Consecration: June 24, 1978 by John Francis Whealon, John Francis Hackett, and Ulises Aurelio Casiano Vargas

Personal details
- Born: February 13, 1935 (age 91) New Haven, Connecticut, US

Styles of Peter Anthony Rosazza
- Reference style: His Excellency; The Most Reverend
- Spoken style: Your Excellency
- Religious style: Bishop

Peter Anthony Rosazza (born February 13, 1935) is an American prelate of the Roman Catholic Church. He served as an auxiliary bishop of the Archdiocese of Hartford in Connecticut from 1978 to 2010.

== Biography ==
=== Early life ===
The eldest child of Aldo and Agatha (née Dinneen) Rosazza, Peter Rosazza was born on February 13, 1935, in New Haven, Connecticut, and raised in Torrington, Connecticut. He attended St. Francis Elementary School in Torrington and graduated from Torrington High School in 1952.

Rosazza studied at Dartmouth College in Hanover, New Hampshire, for a year before entering St. Thomas Seminary in Bloomfield, Connecticut. He then attended St. Bernard Seminary in Rochester, New York and Saint-Sulpice Seminary in Paris

=== Priesthood ===
Rosazza was ordained to the priesthood by Bishop Jacques Le Cordier for the Archdiocese of Hartford in Rome on June 29, 1961. After returning to Connecticut, Rosazza served as assistant pastor at St. Timothy Parish in West Hartford, Connecticut. He later joined the faculty of St. Thomas Seminary, where he taught French, Spanish, and Italian. In 1972, Rosazza became co-pastor of Sacred Heart Parish, the mother church of Hartford's Hispanic Catholic community.

=== Auxiliary Bishop of Hartford ===
Pope Paul VI appointed Rosazza as an auxiliary bishop of the Archdiocese of Hartford and titular bishop of Oppidum Novum on February 28, 1978. He was consecrated on June 24, 1978, by Archbishop John Whealon, with Bishops John Hackett and Ulises Vargas serving as co-consecrators.

As auxiliary bishop, Rosazza was assigned in 1981 to pastoral work in Waterbury, Connecticut. Between 1980 and 1986, he served as a member of the Committee of Bishops that wrote the pastoral letter Economic Justice for All. In 1988, he was transferred to a parish in New Haven, Connecticut. On February 2, 1997, Rosazza was named episcopal vicar for Spanish-speaking Catholics in the archdiocese.

Rosazza was a member of the United States Conference of Catholic Bishops' (USCCB) Committee for Social Development and World Peace and was liaison with Brazilian Catholics for the Committee on Migration and Refugees. He also served as bishop advisor to the National Catholic Student Coalition. He was one of the founders of the Naugatuck Valley Project, a coalition of churches and labor union locals as well as ECCO (Elm City Congregations Organized), a community organization of 18 churches in the New Haven, Connecticut area. Rosazza was one of five American bishops who drafted the USCCB pastoral letter on the U.S. Economy and Catholic social teaching.

On January 19, 2004, Rosazza announced the resignation of Andrew Brizzolara, the pastor of St. Michael's Parish in New Haven. Brizzolara had been accused of sexual abuse in the 1980s during his time serving in the Archdiocese of Boston. In December 2009, Rosazza sat for a one-hour public radio interview on the Colin McEnroe show.

On June 30, 2010, Pope Benedict XVI accepted Rosazza's letter of resignation as auxiliary bishop of the Diocese of Hartford, submitted when Rosazza turned age 75 on February 13, 2010.

== See also ==
- Catholic Church hierarchy
- Catholic Church in the United States
- Historical list of the Catholic bishops of the United States
- List of Catholic bishops of the United States
- Lists of patriarchs, archbishops, and bishops

== Episcopal succession ==
Catholic Church titles
Preceded by -	Auxiliary Bishop of Hartford; 1978–2010	Succeeded by -
