= St. Thomas Seminary =

Former Roman Catholic seminary in Connecticut

Coordinates: 41.8072°N 72.7334°W

The Pastoral Center, located in Bloomfield, Connecticut, is operated by the Archdiocese of Hartford. It is an office facility, a library, a chapel and a retirement home for diocesan priests. The Pastoral Center opened as St. Thomas Seminary in 1897, serving as a minor seminary for the archdiocese. The seminary closed during the 1990s.

== Pastoral Center ==
The Pastoral Center serves as the headquarters of the Central Services Offices for the Archdiocese of Hartford. It also houses the Archbishop O'Brien Library and the St. Thomas Seminary Chapel.

In 2007, Archbishop Henry J. Mansell dedicated the Archbishop Daniel A. Cronin Residence for retired priests. a state of the art facility. The apartment suites were built in two of the four former dormitory halls of the seminary.

== Former St. Thomas Seminary ==
Former St. Thomas Seminary
- Motto: Spes Messis in Semine; Hope to Harvest the Seeds
- Type: Private
- Active: 1897–1990s
- Location: Bloomfield, Connecticut; United States
- Campus: Rural
- Colors: Blue and White
- Nickname: Saints

=== History ===
==== Collins Street (1897–1930) ====
St. Thomas Seminary was founded in 1897 by Bishop Michael Tierney to prepare priests for what was then the Diocese of Hartford. The seminary was located at 352 Collins Street in Hartford, in what previously served as the Chinese College.Tierney appointed Monsignor John Synnott as the first president of St. Thomas. The first class had 37 students.

The first floor of St. Thomas contained a study hall, classrooms, refectory, and parlors. The second floor consisted of a chapel, a dormitory, and the professors' rooms. The diocese was soon forced to added another building to the seminary.Due to the increasing enrollment at St. Thomas, the archdiocese decided in the 1920s to move to a larger site in Bloomfield. Bishop John J. Nilan laid the cornerstone for the new St. Thomas in 1928.

==== Bloomfield (1930 – 1990s) ====
In 1930, St. Thomas opened at its new location in Bloomfield. The seminary campus was designed by architect Louis A. Walsh of Waterbury and built by W. F. O'Neil. During its first 45 years, the seminary educated seminarians for the Diocese of Hartford. In 1942, seminarians from the Dioceses of Albany, Burlington, and Manchester enrolled at the seminary. The following year, the Dioceses of Portland and Springfield in Massachusetts sent students to St. Thomas. The seminary closed in the 1990s.

=== Curriculum ===
At its founding in 1897, St. Thomas offered a five-year classical program. It included of courses in Latin, Greek, and English, as well as systematic training in French and German. Other courses in the program were mathematics, natural sciences, Christian doctrine, and history.

The seminary later changed to a six-year program, offering four years of high school and the first two years of college. Students completing the six-year program would receive an Associate of Arts degree.The two-year college program for 1954 to 1955 provided the following curriculum:

Freshman Year:

- Appreciation of Literature, Poetry
- Latin Literature, Livy, Tacitus, Horace, Cicero
- Latin Composition
- Elementary Greek
- French, German or Italian
- General Inorganic Chemistry
- Religion
- Public Speaking
- Music
- Mathematics

Sophomore Year:

- Novel, Composition
- Latin Literature, Horace, Cicero, St. Augustine, Tacitus
- Latin Composition
- Advanced Greek
- French, German or Italian
- Modern European History
- Religion
- Public Speaking
- Physics
- Music

=== Seminary life ===
==== Student organizations ====
- Stella Matutina – The Stella Matutina, (Morning Star) was the seminary's quarterly literary magazine. It was founded in 1917. The first editors of the magazine were Patrick Flynn, Lester Loughran, and Harry O'Brien. Its twofold plan was to foster "the literary inclinations of the undergraduates and of uniting the alumni more closely to their ALMA MATER." The Stella Matutina contained articles and poetry by seminarians.. The articles ranged from seminary life to current events, as well as academic papers. Later volumes contained photographs.
- Literary and Debating Society – produced monthly programs and also showed films
- King's Masquers – produced four plays a year
- Glee Club – performed twice yearly
- Schola Cantorum – sang for the special feast day liturgies
- Orchestra – gave two public performances a year, organized in 1942
- Printing Club – printed programs for the various school activities
- Camera Club – photographed major seminary events and displayed photographs
- Third Order of St. Francis – A bi-weekly spiritual club
- Mission Society – founded in 1920

==== Athletics ====
Basketball and baseball were among the sports played at the original seminary on Collins Street. Among St. Thomas' biggest rivals was Hartford High School. A tennis team was started in 1924. After moving to Bloomfield, basketball was briefly dropped due to a lack of facilities. Sports added to replace basketball included ice hockey (1932), bowling (1934), and golf.

St. Thomas also offered intramural sports, including basketball, baseball, handball, tennis, ice hockey, golf, bowling, touch football, volleyball, softball, and billiards. The largest intramural sports event was the annual Field Day, with inter-class rivalry.

=== Rectors ===
This is a list of rectors at the St. Thomas Seminary and the current Pastoral Center:

- Right Reverend John Synnott (1897–1921)
- Reverend Maurice F. McAuliffe (1921–1934)
- Reverend Henry J. O'Brien (1934–1940)
- Reverend Joseph M. Griffin (1940–1947)
- Right Reverend Monsignor Raymond G. LaFontaine (1947–1954)
- Right Reverend Monsignor John J. Byrnes (1954–1967)
- Reverend James J. Conefrey (1967–1975)
- Reverend John J. Kiely (1975–1980)
- Reverend Charles B. Johnson (1980–1985)
- Reverend Christie A. Macaluso (1985–1991)
- Reverend Robert A. O'Grady (1991–1996)
- Reverend Aidan N. Donahue (1996–2001)
- Reverend Monsignor Gerard G. Schmitz (2001–2014)
- Most Reverend Christie A. Macaluso (2014–present)

=== St. Thomas alumni who became bishops ===
- Francis P. Keough – bishop of Providence (1934 –1947); archbishop of Baltimore (1948 – 1961)
- Henry J. O'Brien – auxiliary bishop of Hartford (1934 – 1945); bishop of Hartford (1945 – 1953); archbishop of Hartford (1953 – 1968)
- Matthew F. Brady – bishop of Burlington (1938 – 1944); bishop of Manchester (1944 – 1959)
- Peter L. Gerety – coadjutor bishop of Portland (1966 – 1969); bishop of Portland (1969 – 1974); archbishop of Newark (1974 – 1986)
- Vincent J. Hines – bishop of Norwich (1959 – 1975)
- Robert E. Mulvee – auxiliary bishop of Manchester (1977 – 1985); bishop of Wilmington (1985 – 1995); coadjutor bishop of Providence (1995–1997); Bishop of Providence (1997 – 2005)
- Joseph F. Donnelly – auxiliary bishop of Hartford (1964 – 1977)
- John F. Hackett – auxiliary bishop of Hartford (1953 – 1986)
- Peter A. Rosazza – auxiliary bishop of Hartford (1978 – 2010)
- Ambrose Battista De Paol – auxiliary bishop of Miami (1983 – 2007); apostolic pro-nuncio to Sri Lanka (1983 – 1988); apostolic delegate to South Africa (1988 – 1997); apostolic pro-nuncio to Lesotho (1988 – 1997); apostolic nuncio to Swaziland (1993 – 1997); apostolic delegate to Namibia (1994 – 1997); apostolic nuncio to Botswana (1994 – 1997); apostolic nuncio to Japan (1997 – 2004); apostolic nuncio to Australia (2004 – 2007)
- Paul S. Loverde – auxiliary bishop of Hartford (1988 – 1994); bishop of Ogdensburg (1994 – 1999); bishop of Arlington (1999 – present)
- Christie A. Macaluso – auxiliary bishop of Hartford (1997 – present)
- Joseph K. Symons – auxiliary bishop of St. Petersburg (1981 – 1983); bishop of Pensacola-Tallahassee (1983 – 1990); bishop of Palm Beach (1990 – 1998)
