= Diocesan Sisters College =

Catholic college in Connecticut, US (1949–1969)

Diocesan Sisters College was a sisters' college in Bloomfield, Connecticut. It was formed in 1949. Its primary goal was to educate nuns who would then be teachers in Catholic schools. It closed in 1969.
