= John Francis Whealon =

American prelate

His Excellency, The Most Reverend John Francis Whealon
- Archbishop of Hartford; Titular Bishop of Andrapa
- See: Archdiocese of Hartford
- Appointed: December 28, 1968
- Term ended: August 2, 1991
- Predecessor: Henry Joseph O'Brien
- Successor: Daniel Anthony Cronin
- Other posts: Auxiliary Bishop of Cleveland (1961–1966); Bishop of Erie (1966–1968)

Orders
- Ordination: May 26, 1945
- Consecration: July 6, 1961 by Egidio Vagnozzi

Personal details
- Born: January 15, 1921 Barberton, Ohio, US
- Died: August 2, 1991 (aged 70) Hartford, Connecticut, US
- Denomination: Roman Catholic Church
- Education: University of Ottawa; Pontifical Biblical Institute

John Francis Whealon (January 15, 1921 – August 2, 1991) was an American prelate of the Roman Catholic Church. He served as archbishop of the Archdiocese of Hartford in Connecticut from 1968 to 1991.

Whealon previously served as an auxiliary bishop of the Diocese of Cleveland in Ohio from 1961 to 1966 and as bishop of the Diocese of Erie in Pennsylvania from 1966 to 1968.

== Biography ==
=== Early life ===
John Whealon was born in Barberton, Ohio, to John Joseph and Mary Christina (née Zanders) Whealon. He received his early education at St. Augustine School in Barberton from 1927 to 1934, and attended St. Charles College in Catonsville, Maryland, from 1934 to 1940. Returning to Ohio, Whealon studied theology at St. Mary's Seminary in Cleveland from 1940 to 1945.

=== Priesthood ===
Whealon was ordained to the priesthood on May 26, 1945. He briefly served as a curate at St. Peter Parish in Akron, Ohio, then entered the University of Ottawa, where he earned a Doctor of Sacred Theology degree.

Upon his return to Ohio, Whealon served as a curate at St. Dominic Parish in Shaker Heights and professor of Sacred Scripture at St. Mary's Seminary from 1946 to 1948. He furthered his studies at the Pontifical Biblical Institute in Rome from 1948 to 1950. He returned to Ohio and was named a curate at St. Aloysius Parish in Cleveland in 1950.

Whealon resumed his post as professor at St. Mary's Seminary in 1952, and became rector of Borromeo Seminary in Wickliffe the following year. He was named a papal chamberlain in 1955, and raised to the rank of domestic prelate in 1959. He contributed to Catholic Biblical Quarterly and was vice president of the Catholic Biblical Association (1959–60).

=== Auxiliary Bishop of Cleveland ===
On June 5, 1961, Whealon was appointed as an auxiliary bishop of Cleveland and Titular Bishop of Andrapa by Pope John XXIII. He received his episcopal consecration on July 6, 1961, from Archbishop Egidio Vagnozzi, with Bishops Paul John Hallinan and Floyd Lawrence Begin serving as co-consecrators. Between 1962 and 1965, Whealon attended all four sessions in Rome of the Second Vatican Council.

=== Bishop of Erie ===
Following the resignation of Archbishop John Mark Gannon, Whealon was named the sixth bishop of Erie by Pope Paul VI on December 9, 1966.

=== Archbishop of Hartford ===
On December 28, 1968, Whealon was appointed archbishop of Hartford by Paul VI following the resignation of Archbishop Henry O'Brien. During his 23-year-long administration, Whealon established a program to train married men to be ordained as deacons, advocated the promotion of women within the structure of the Church, and developed a team ministry in which clerical and lay people administer a parish together. In 1986, he appointed Sister Helen M. Feeney to be first woman chancellor of the archdiocese and only the fifth woman chancellor in the country. Whealon also founded the radio station WJMJ in Hartford. He was active on ecumenical issues, and was chair of the Committee on Ecumenism of the National Conference of Catholic Bishops and head of ChrisConn, the Christian conference of Connecticut.

=== Death and legacy ===
John Whealon died unexpectedly during a surgical procedure at St. Francis Hospital in Hartford on August 2, 1991. The archdiocese's annual fundraising golf tournament is named in his honor. Additionally, a Waterbury, Connecticut, council of the Knights of Columbus bears his name - the Archbishop John F. Whealon Council 10865.

In 2012, a Connecticut man sued the archdiocese, claiming that he had been sexually abused when an altar boy in the 1970s by Ivan Ferguson, an archdiocesan priest. The plaintiff accused Whealon of covering up Ferguson's criminal acts and allowing his transfers to other assignments. In 2017 another man sued the archdiocese for negligence, claiming that Daniel McSheffery, an archdiocesan priest at St. George Parish in Guilford, Connecticut, sexually abused him over 250 times, starting at age nine. The plaintiff claimed that Whealon knew that McSheffery was a danger to children.

== Viewpoints ==
=== Abortion ===
Whealon left the Democratic Party in 1988 because of his opposition to abortion rights for women, declaring in his column in the weekly Catholic Transcript that he was "unable in conscience to remain a registered Democrat" because of the party's support of legal and government-financed abortions. In 1974, he said that Catholic healthcare professionals who participated in abortions faced excommunication. Whealon resigned from a local television station's program advisory committee because the station refused to cancel an episode of the comedy series Maude that dealt with abortion.

=== Birth Control ===
Whealon described a State of Connecticut-sponsored advertising campaign that encouraged sexually active adults to use condoms to prevents HIV/AIDS as "a commendable effort but a serious mistake to present condoms as the answer to the threat."

=== War ===
Whealon supported the participation of the United States in Vietnam War and defended the maintenance of nuclear weapons.

Catholic Church titles
Vacant Title last held by Angelo Cesare Vigiani	— TITULAR — Bishop of Andrapa; 1961–1966	Vacant
Preceded by John Mark Gannon	Bishop of Erie; 1966–1968	Succeeded by Alfred Michael Watson
Preceded by Henry Joseph O'Brien	Archbishop of Hartford; 1968–1991	Succeeded by Daniel Anthony Cronin
