= Henry Joseph O'Brien =

American prelate

- Archbishop of Hartford
- Church: Catholic Church
- Archdiocese: Archdiocese of Hartford
- In office: April 7, 1945 – November 20, 1968
- Predecessor: Maurice F. McAuliffe
- Successor: John Francis Whealon
- Other post: Titular Archbishop of Uthina (1968-1971)
- Previous posts: Titular Bishop of Sita (1940-1945); Auxiliary Bishop of Hartford (1940-1945)

Orders
- Ordination: July 8, 1923 by Désiré-Joseph Mercier
- Consecration: May 14, 1940 by Amleto Giovanni Cicognani

Personal details
- Born: July 21, 1896 New Haven, Connecticut, United States
- Died: July 23, 1976 (aged 80) Hartford, Connecticut, United States

Henry Joseph O'Brien (July 21, 1896 – July 23, 1976) was an American prelate of the Roman Catholic Church. He served as the first Archbishop of Hartford from 1945 to 1968.

== Biography ==
Ordination history of Henry Joseph O'Brien
History
Episcopal consecration
- Consecrated by: Amleto Giovanni Cicognani
Episcopal succession
Bishops consecrated by Henry Joseph O'Brien as principal consecrator
- John Francis Hackett: March 19, 1953
- Paul J. Girouard, M.S.: March 7, 1956
- Edward Aloysius McGurkin, M.M.: October 3, 1956
- Vincent Joseph Hines: March 17, 1960
- Joseph Francis Donnelly: January 28, 1965
- Peter Leo Gerety: June 1, 1966

Henry O'Brien was born in New Haven, Connecticut, to Michael and Anna (née Sweeney) O'Brien. After graduating from New Haven High School in 1914, he studied at St. Thomas Seminary in Bloomfield (1914–1917) and at St. Bernard's Seminary in Rochester, New York (1917–1919).

In 1919, he was sent to the Catholic University of Leuven in Belgium, where he was ordained to the priesthood on July 8, 1923. Following his return to the United States later that year, he served as a curate at St. Mary's, Windsor Locks until 1924, when he was transferred to St. Thomas Aquinas, Fairfield. He became a professor at St. Thomas Seminary in 1926, later becoming its vice-president (1932) and afterwards president (1934).

On March 19, 1940, O'Brien was appointed Auxiliary Bishop of Hartford and Titular Bishop of Sita by Pope Pius XII. He received his episcopal consecration on the following May 14 from Archbishop Amleto Giovanni Cicognani, with Bishops Maurice F. McAuliffe and Joseph Edward McCarthy serving as co-consecrators. Following the death of Bishop McAuliffe in December 1944, O'Brien was named ninth Bishop of Hartford on April 7, 1945. The number of Catholics and parishes in Connecticut grew substantially during the post-World War II era. When the Diocese of Hartford was elevated to the rank of an archdiocese on August 6, 1953, O'Brien was made its first archbishop. At the same time, O'Brien became Metropolitan of the Hartford Province (Hartford, Bridgeport, Norwich, Providence).

The Cathedral of St. Joseph was destroyed by a fire of suspicious origin on 31 December 1956. The archbishop immediately began plans to construct a new cathedral on the same site. Ground was broken for the new edifice on 8 September 1958. The new structure was consecrated on 15 May 1962 by Auxiliary Bishop John F. Hackett; due to illness, Archbishop O'Brien was unable to preside. While O'Brien was staunchly opposed to birth control, the Archdiocese under his leadership gave $15,000 to a private birth control organization that advocated the symptothermic method, a refinement of the rhythm method used by many Catholics to avoid pregnancy. He later joined his fellow Catholic bishops in Connecticut in opposing a bill that would have permitted abortions for pregnancies resulting from rape. He attended all four sessions of the Second Vatican Council between 1962 and 1965. In 1965 he launched a campaign to end employment discrimination by refusing to do business with discriminatory concerns.

After twenty-three years as head of the Hartford Archdiocese, O'Brien resigned on November 20, 1968; he was appointed Titular Archbishop of Uthina on the same date. He was apostolic administrator of the Archdiocese until March 19, 1969, when his successor, John F. Whealon, was installed in the Cathedral of St. Joseph. He resigned his titular see on January 5, 1971. He died at St. Francis Hospital in Hartford on July 23, 1976, two days after his 80th birthday. He was interred in the bishops' plot at Mount St. Benedict Cemetery, Bloomfield, Connecticut.

Catholic Church titles
Preceded by Bishop Maurice F. McAuliffe	Archbishop of Hartford; 1945–1969	Succeeded by John Francis Whealon
