= John Francis Hackett =

American prelate

His Excellency, The Most Reverend John Francis Hackett
- Auxiliary Bishop of Hartford
- Church: Catholic
- Archdiocese: Hartford

Orders
- Ordination: June 29, 1936 by Jean Verdier
- Consecration: March 19, 1953 by Henry Joseph O'Brien, Francis Patrick Keough, and Matthew Francis Brady

Personal details
- Born: December 11, 1911 New Haven, Connecticut, U.S.
- Died: May 30, 1990 (aged 78) Hartford, Connecticut, U.S
- Education: St. Thomas Seminary; Saint-Sulpice Seminary
- Motto: Manete in Christo (Abide in Christ)

John Francis Hackett (December 7, 1911 – May 30, 1990) was an American prelate of the Roman Catholic Church in the United States. He served as an auxiliary bishop of the Archdiocese of Hartford in Connecticut from 1953 to 1986.

== Biography ==
=== Early life ===
Hackett was born on December 7, 1911, in New Haven, Connecticut, one of seven children of Thomas J. and Anne (Whalen) Hackett. He received his early education at public schools in New Haven, including Lovell School and Hillhouse High School. In 1929, he began his studies for the priesthood at St. Thomas Seminary in Bloomfield, Connecticut. In 1931, he was sent to continue his studies at Saint-Sulpice Seminary in Issy, France.

=== Priesthood ===
On June 29, 1936, Hackett was ordained a priest for the Diocese of Hartford by Cardinal Jean Verdier at Notre Dame Cathedral in Paris. Following his return to Connecticut, Hackett was assigned as a curate at St. Aloysius Parish in New Canaan, Connecticut, where he remained for nine years. From 1945 to 1952, he served as secretary to Bishop Henry Joseph O'Brien and assistant chancellor of the diocese. He was named vice-chancellor in 1951 and chancellor in 1953.

=== Auxiliary Bishop of Hartford ===
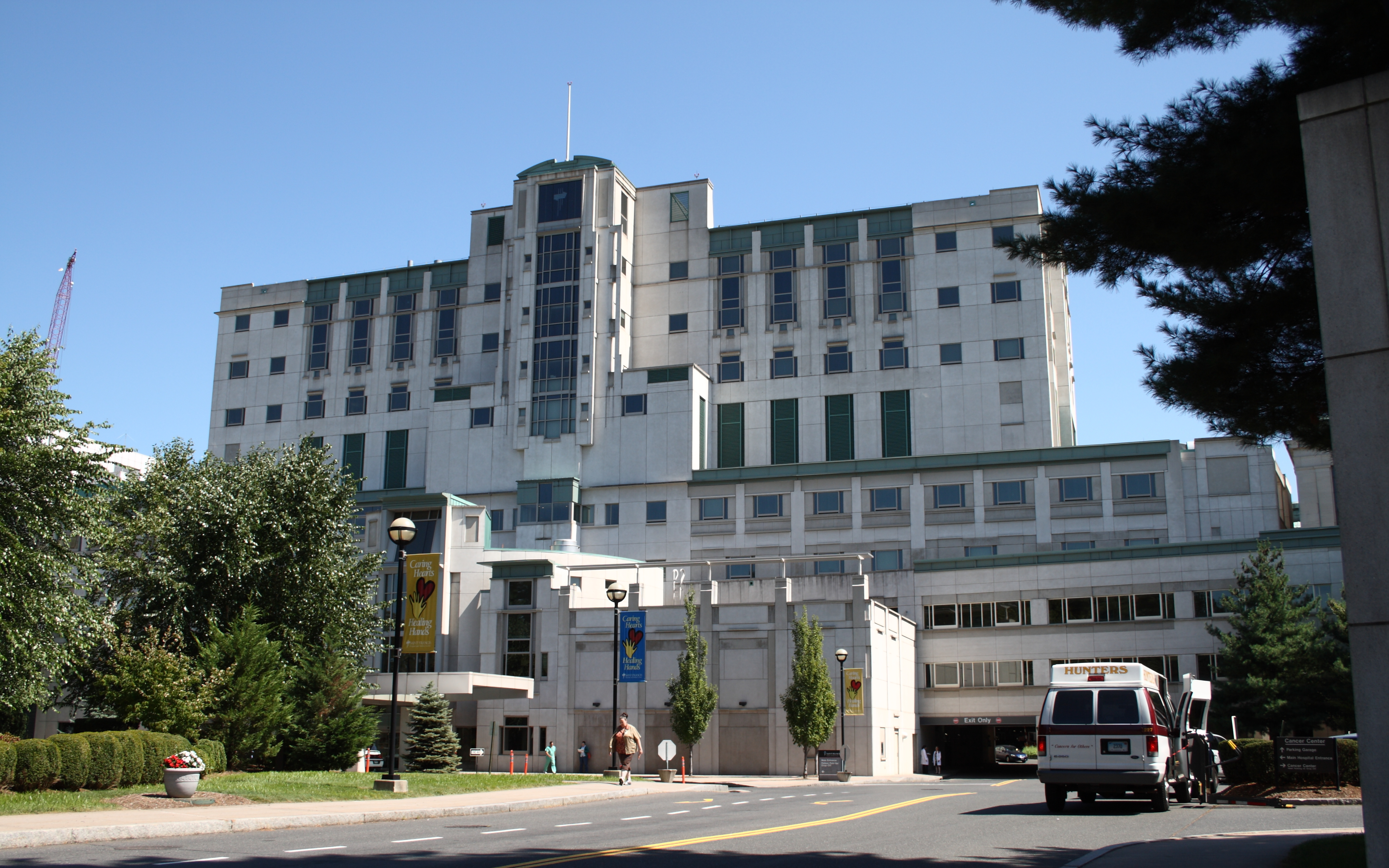
St. Francis Hospital & Medical Center, Hartford, Connecticut (2009

On December 10, 1952, Hackett was appointed auxiliary bishop of Hartford and titular bishop of Helenopolis in Palaestina by Pope Pius XII. He received his episcopal consecration on March 19, 1953, from O'Brien, with Archbishop Francis Patrick Keough and Bishop Matthew Francis Brady serving as co-consecrators, at St. Joseph's Cathedral in Hartford. Hackett selected as his episcopal motto: Manete In Christo (Latin: "Remain in Christ"). The Diocese of Hartford was elevated to an archdiocese in August of that year. In 1959, Hackett relinquished his duties as chancellor to become vicar general of the archdiocese.

Hackett served as a board member of Saint Francis Hospital in Hartford, St. Mary's Hospital in Waterbury, Connecticut, and the Hospital of St. Raphael in New Haven. He also served as president of the New England Conference of Catholic Hospitals and chair of the New England Regional Conference of the National Conference of Catholic Bishops.

=== Retirement and death ===
Hackett retired as auxiliary bishop of Hartford on December 7, 1986.He died from cancer at St. Francis Hospital, at age 78.

Catholic Church titles
Preceded by –	Auxiliary Bishop of Hartford; 1953–1986	Succeeded by –
