= William A. Hickey =

American Catholic prelate (1869–1933)

His Excellency, The Most Reverend William Augustine Hickey
- Bishop of Providence; Titular Bishop of Claudiopolis
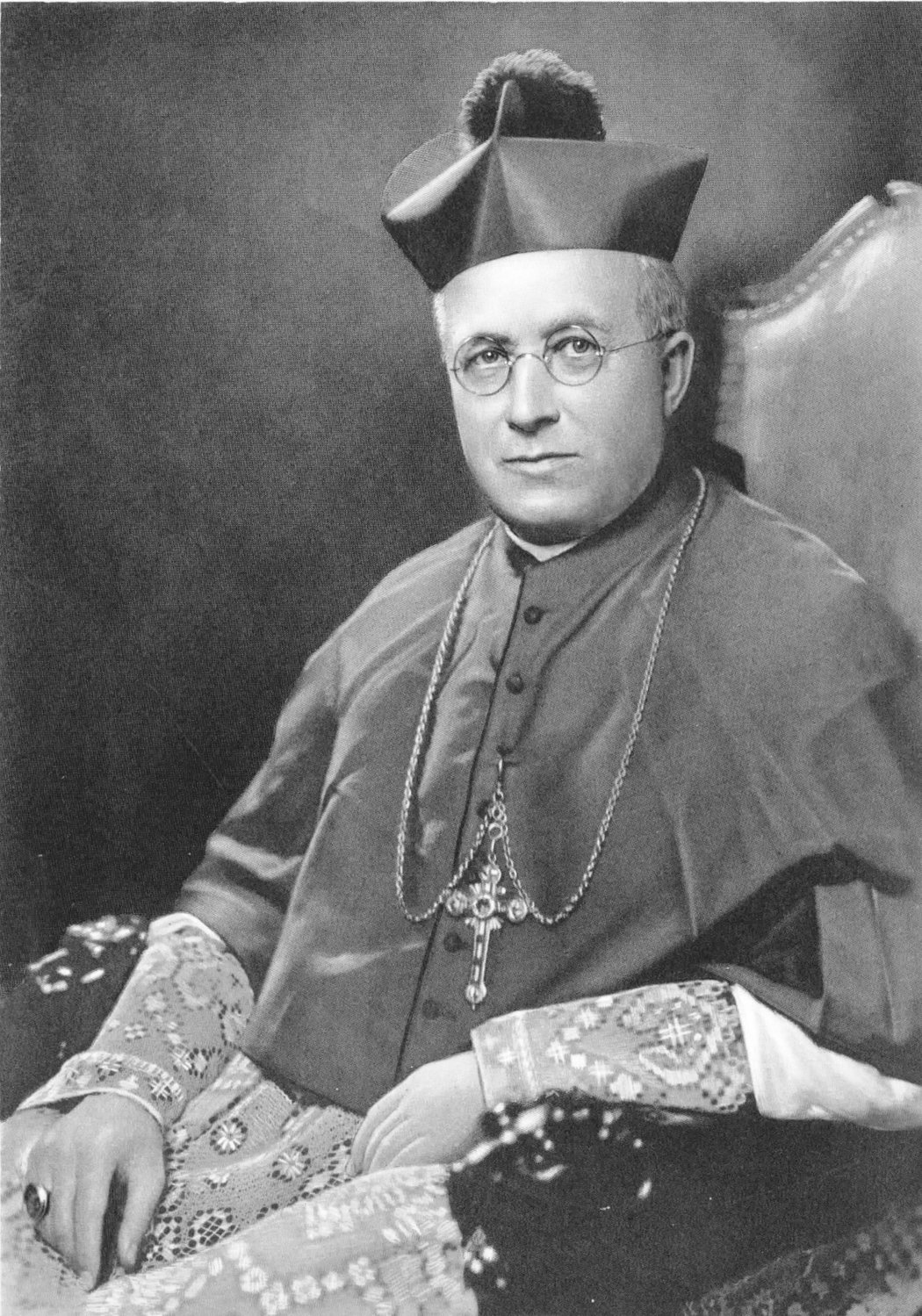
- William A. Hickey
- See: Diocese of Providence
- Predecessor: Matthew Harkins
- Successor: Francis Patrick Keough

Orders
- Ordination: December 22, 1893 by John Joseph Williams
- Consecration: April 10, 1919 by Thomas Daniel Beaven

Personal details
- Born: May 13, 1869 Worcester, Massachusetts, US
- Died: October 4, 1933 (aged 64) Providence, Rhode Island, US
- Denomination: Roman Catholic
- Education: College of the Holy Cross; St. Sulpice Seminary; St. John's Seminary
- Motto: Dominus regit me (The Lord governs me)

Styles of William Augustine Hickey
- Reference style: The Most Reverend
- Spoken style: Your Excellency
- Religious style: Monsignor
- Posthumous style: none

William Augustine Hickey (May 13, 1869 – October 4, 1933) was an American Catholic prelate who served as bishop of Providence in Rhode Island from 1921 until his death in 1933.

== Biography ==
=== Early life ===
William Hickey was born on May 13, 1869, in Worcester, Massachusetts, to William and Margaret (née Troy) Hickey. His father served in both the Union Army and the Union Navy during the American Civil War. Hickey attended the College of the Holy Cross in Worcester, Massachusetts, then went to France to study at St. Sulpice Seminary in Issy-les-Moulineaux. Upon his return to Massachusetts, Hickey attended St. John's Seminary in Boston.

=== Priesthood ===
Hickey was ordained to the priesthood for the Diocese of Worcester by Archbishop John Williams on December 22, 1893. He then held several pastoral roles in Worcester County.

From 1903 to 1917, Hickey served as a pastor in Gilbertville, Massachusetts, where he would preach in four different languages (English, French, Polish, and Lithuanian) every Sunday. He was then transferred to St. John's Parish in Clinton, Massachusetts, where he built a parochial school and parish hall. Hickey gained a reputation as an accomplished and patriotic speaker. After the United States entered World War I in 1917. U.S. Senator David I. Walsh made these comments about Hickey:

Father Hickey has...been a soldier camping in the homes of the sick and the poor under the white banner of the Church, fighting for salvation; has battled for Christ in the trenches of humanity. Not a day has passed over his head since our boys first left Clinton that he has not prayed for his people.

=== Coadjutor bishop and bishop of Providence ===
On January 16, 1919, Hickey was appointed coadjutor bishop of Providence and titular bishop of Claudiopolis in Isauria by Pope Benedict XV. Hickey received his episcopal consecration on April 10, 1919, from Bishop Thomas Beaven, with Bishops Louis Walsh and Daniel Feehan serving as co-consecrators, in the Cathedral of Saints Peter and Paul in Providence. He was immediately appointed as apostolic administrator for the diocese by the incumbent Bishop Matthew Harkins. Hickey automatically became the third bishop of Providence on Harkin's death on May 25, 1921.

==== Language controversy ====
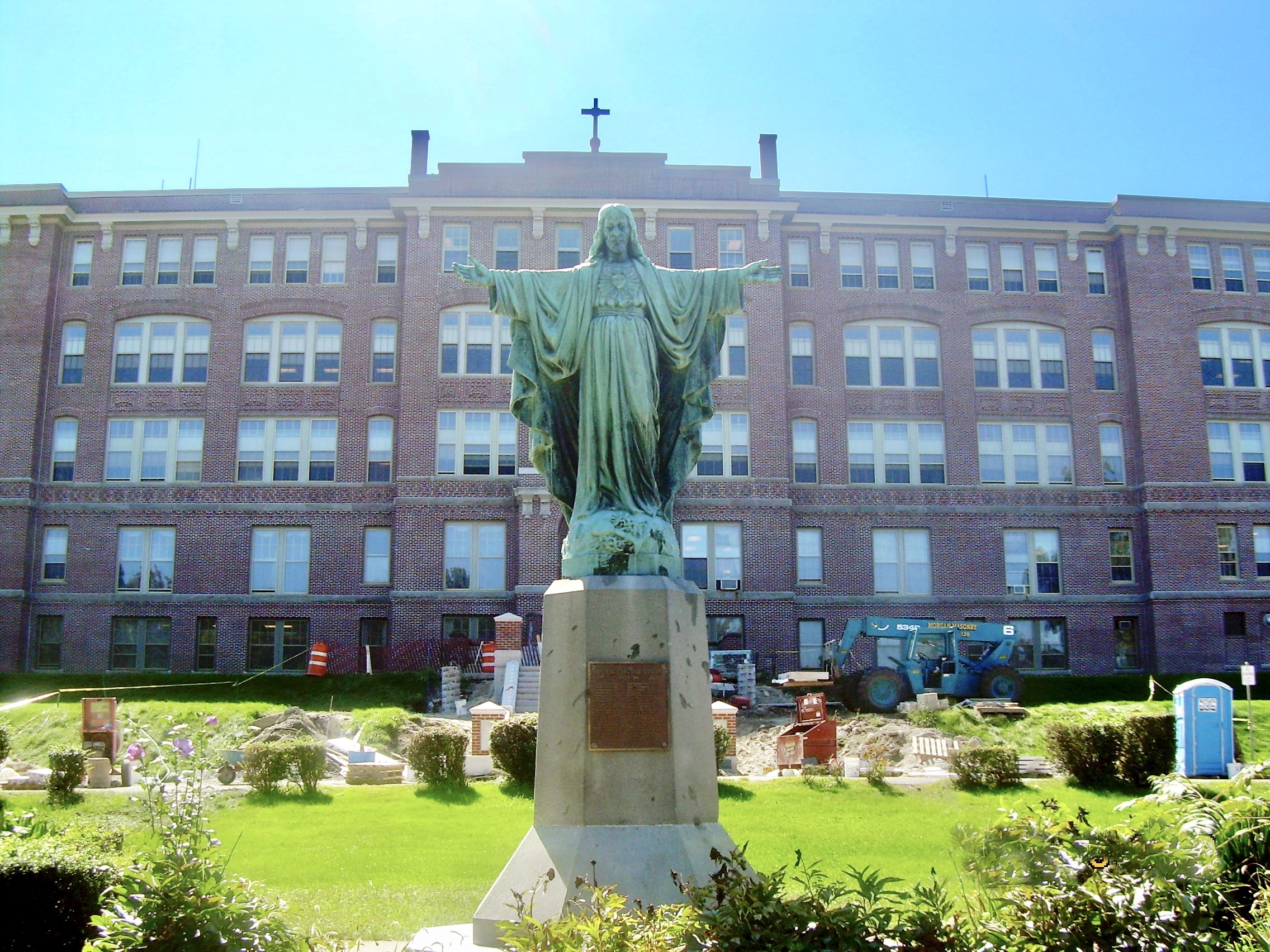
Mount Saint Charles Academy, Woonsocket, Rhode Island (2006)

In 1919, the Federation of Canadian Catholic Churches in America announced plans to build a Catholic high school in Woonsocket, Rhode Island, a community with a majority French-Canadian population. As the local population started fundraising for the new school, they learned that Hickey was only going to allow classes there to be taught in English

For decades, the diocese had fostered French-language schools and had recruited both French and French-Canadian sisters to teach there.However, by the 1920's, dioceses across the United States were switching to English instruction. When Mount Saint Charles Academy opened in 1924, the classes were in English. Elphege Daignault, a Woonsocket lawyer, started organizing a protest movement. In one swipe at Hickey, who had Irish parents, he labeled the Irish-American clergy in the diocese as “national assassins". While Daignault had wide support in the parish, not everyone agree with his vitriolic attacks on Hickey and other Irish clergy.

in 1924, the dissidents founded the newspaper La Sentinelle, to express their opposition to the language decision. The dissidents were now called Sentinellists.They first appealed Hickey's decision to Archbishop Pietro Fumasoni-Biondi, the apostolic delegate, or Vatican representative, to the United States. When that appeal failed, Daignault sued the diocese in state court in Rhode Island. The Rhode Island Supreme Court eventually ruled against him, saying that it had no jurisdiction in church affairs. By this point, the controversy had gained publicity in French-Canadian communities throughout the United States and Canada. The Sentinellists finally sent a delegation to the Vatican to appeal directly to Pope Pius XI; he refused to see them.

In 1928, four years after the language controversy started, Hickey excommunicated Daignault and 62 other Sentinellists. He placed La Sentinelle on the Index Librorum Prohibitorum., prohibiting Catholics from reading it. Hickey went further in 1929, barring the excommunicated individuals from entering any Catholic churches in the diocese Daignault and the other excommunicated Sentinellists quickly recanted their opposition to Hickey and he lifted their excommunications.

=== Death ===
Hickey died in Providence on October 4, 1933, from a heart attack at age 64.

== Episcopal succession ==
Catholic Church titles
Preceded by Matthew Harkins	Bishop of Providence; 1921–1933	Succeeded by Francis Patrick Keough
