= Sacred Heart Academy (Hamden, Connecticut) =

Location
- 265 Benham Street; Hamden, New Haven County, Connecticut 06514; United States
- Coordinates: 41°22′1″N 72°55′53″W

Information
- Type: Private, All-Girls
- Motto: Excelsior (Ever higher)
- Religious affiliation: Roman Catholic
- Established: 1946
- CEEB code: 070263
- President: Sheila O'Neill
- Principal: Kathleen Mary Coonan
- Faculty: 68
- Grades: 9–12
- Enrollment: 500
- Average class size: 18-23
- Student to teacher ratio: 10:1
- Campus size: 127 acres (0.51 km^{2})
- Colors: Red and white
- Athletics conference: Southern Connecticut Conference
- Mascot: Shark
- Nickname: SHA
- Team name: Sharks
- Accreditation: New England Association of Schools and Colleges
- Publication: PRISM (literary magazine)
- Newspaper: Alethea
- Yearbook: Clelian
- Tuition: $16,500
- Alumni: 7000+
- Website: www.sacredhearthamden.org

Sacred Heart Academy is a young women's college preparatory, Roman Catholic high school in Hamden, Connecticut, and part of the Roman Catholic Archdiocese of Hartford. It is run by the Apostles of the Sacred Heart of Jesus, an order of religious sisters founded in Italy by Mother Clelia Merloni. The school is located atop Mt. Sacred Heart, which is the U.S. Provincialate of the sisters. Their team mascot is the Shark. Their brother school was Notre Dame High School West Haven, Connecticut, and their sister school is Cor Jesu Academy in St. Louis, Missouri.

== History ==
Sacred Heart Academy was founded on September 9, 1946, by Sr. M. Antonine Signorelli of the Missionary Zelatrices of the Sacred Heart of Jesus, who later became the Apostles of the Sacred Heart of Jesus. Initially located in New Haven, Connecticut, the school was established to provide a Catholic college preparatory education to local young women. The first class contained 17 students, but enrollment numbers rapidly grew. To accommodate increasing popularity, the school was expanded in 1948 with the building of Clelian Hall and in 1957, the school relocated to its current location on Benham Street in Hamden, Connecticut. The school has continued to expand throughout the years, adding classrooms, computer labs, and recreational facilities as needed. Currently, the school sits on the same 127-acre (0.51 km^{2}) campus on Benham Street in Hamden and has a student body of about 500 girls, representing 55 different schools from 36 towns across Connecticut.

== Activities at Sacred Heart ==
=== Athletics ===
Sacred Heart Academy competes as a member of the Southern Connecticut Conference (SCC). Each season, students can choose from a variety of sports teams, including field hockey, volleyball, soccer, swimming, cross country running, and cheerleading in the fall, basketball and indoor track in the winter, and lacrosse, softball, tennis, and track and field in the spring. All students, regardless of athletic involvement, have access to a gymnasium, fitness center, Olympic-size outdoor track, softball field, and two playing fields.

=== Fine arts ===
Students interested in drama, music, or art may be involved in a variety of activities to showcase their talents. Each fall, students audition for a musical production which takes place in November. Recent shows have included Annie (2013), White Christmas (2012), The Wiz (2011), Hairspray (2010), Fiddler on the Roof (2009), Les Misérables (2008), Beauty and the Beast (2007), Annie (2006), Sound of Music (2005), Anything Goes (2004), Guys and Dolls (2003), and West Side Story (2002). Shows performed in 2013 and 2012 took place at the Shubert Theatre in New Haven, Connecticut. Students may also join the Drama Club, which puts on a performance each spring.

A variety of music groups meet after school each week. The student orchestra includes a wide variety of string, brass, and woodwind instruments. Members of the orchestra receive course credit. There are also two choirs on campus. The concert choir is open to all students, while the smaller chamber choir requires auditions. Students involved in both the choirs and the orchestra put on several concerts each year. This smaller group traveled to Paris in April 2012, where they performed at Notre Dame Cathedral and Chartres Cathedral.

An Art Club meets occasionally after school, and a student art show takes place at least once every year, showcasing the artwork of students in various elective classes.

== Science at Sacred Heart ==
Sacred Heart Academy has received a great deal of media attention for the scientific accomplishments of its students. Each year since 1998, students enrolled in biotechnology classes have worked on advanced research projects and have presented their findings at a national conference. Early projects caught the attention of Applied Biosystems, which led to their donation of an automated DNA sequencer (an ABI Prism 310 Genetic Analyzer) to the school, making Sacred Heart the first high school in the country to have such technology. In 2005, using funding from a three-year grant from the Vernal W. and Florence H. Bates Foundation, a group of students identified genes implicated in osteoporosis and sequenced the calcitonin and collagen 1 alpha1 receptor genes in Bos taurus. Their findings were presented at a conference in Hilton Head Island, South Carolina, and their sequences were published in GenBank. Following their successes, another group of students continued their project, submitting additional sequences for the calcitonin and vitamin D receptors in Bos taurus and presenting their findings at the Annual Conference sponsored by American Society of Human Genetics in New Orleans, Louisiana. Additional groups of students have presented in Washington, D.C. These accomplishments helped make Sacred Heart the recipient of a grant from the John G. Martin Foundation of Farmington for a molecular science research laboratory.
