= Archdiocese of Hartford =

Latin Catholic jurisdiction in the US

Archdiocese of Hartford Archidioecesis Metropolitae Hartfortiensis
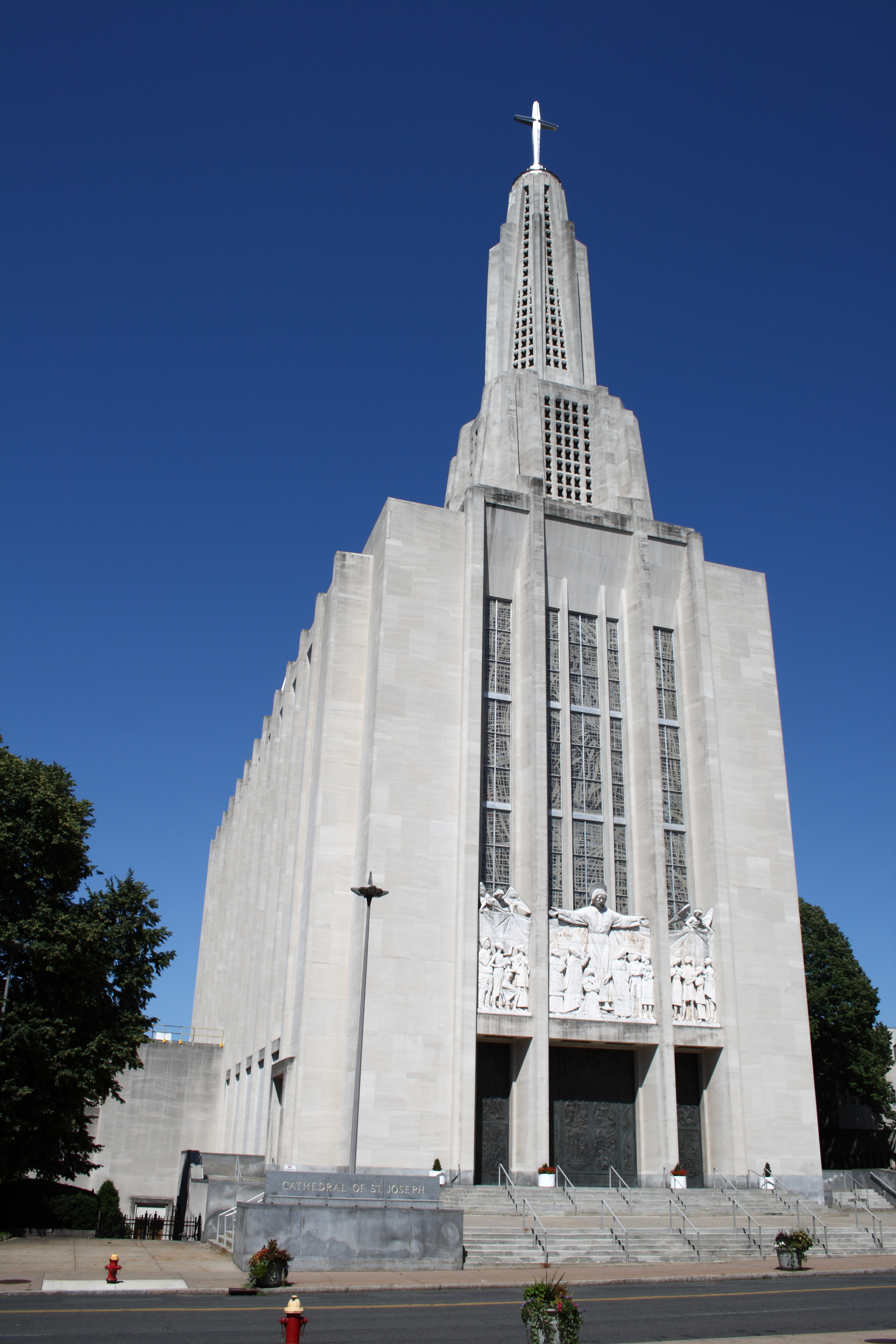
- Cathedral of Saint Joseph

- Coat of arms

Location
- Country: United States
- Territory: Connecticut counties of Hartford, Litchfield, and New Haven
- Episcopal conference: United States Conference of Catholic Bishops
- Ecclesiastical region: Region I
- Ecclesiastical province: Hartford
- Deaneries: 7 Deaneries
- Coordinates: 41°46′05″N 72°41′28″W

Statistics
- Population: Total; Catholics: 1,949,519; 538,185 (27.6%)

Information
- Denomination: Catholic Church
- Sui iuris church: Latin Church
- Rite: Roman Rite
- Established: November 28, 1843
- Cathedral: Cathedral of St. Joseph
- Patron saint: Saint Joseph

Current leadership
- Pope: Leo XIV
- Metropolitan Archbishop: Christopher J. Coyne
- Suffragans: Diocese of Bridgeport; Diocese of Norwich; Diocese of Providence
- Auxiliary Bishops: Juan Miguel Betancourt
- Vicar General: Msgr. James A. Shanley
- Episcopal Vicars: John P. Melnick; John J. Georgia; Joseph T. Donnelly
- Judicial Vicar: George S. Mukuka
- Bishops emeritus: Daniel Anthony Cronin; Peter A. Rosazza; Christie Macaluso; Leonard Paul Blair

Map
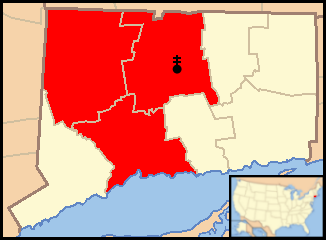

Website
- archdioceseofhartford.org

The Archdiocese of Hartford (Latin: Archidioecesis Hartfortiensis) is an archdiocese of the Catholic Church in Connecticut in the United States. It is a metropolitan see. The other dioceses in its ecclesiastical province are Bridgeport, Norwich, and Providence.

It was established as the Diocese of Hartford in 1843. The mother church of the Archdiocese of Hartford is the Cathedral of Saint Joseph in Hartford. It covers Hartford, Litchfield and New Haven counties. Christopher J. Coyne is the archbishop.

== History ==
=== 1700 to 1843 ===
During the 18th century, the Congregationalists represented the dominant religious faith in the British Province of Connecticut, with very few Catholics in residence. Between 1780 and 1781, just before the end of the American Revolution, the first Catholic mass in the province was celebrated in Lebanon. A reference stated "Mass was first celebrated, continuously and for a long period, within the limits of the State of Connecticut."

In 1789, several years after the formation of the United States, the Vatican erected the Diocese of Baltimore to cover its entire territory, including Connecticut. Several years later, in 1808, the Vatican erected the Diocese of Boston, containing Connecticut and the rest of New England. Until 1818, Congregationalism was the official religion in the state, receiving taxpayer support. When that status was repealed, it opened the door for the Catholic Church to establish itself in Connecticut.

In the 1820s, Irish Catholic immigrants started arriving in Connecticut to construct the Farmington Canal and Enfield Falls Canal. The bishops in Boston, along with many of their priests, would periodically visit Catholic communities in Connecticut to celebrate mass, perform marriages, and baptize babies. Bishop Benedict Fenwick of Boston in 1829 purchased an existing Episcopalian church in Hartford to create Holy Trinity, the first Catholic church in the state. In 1835, a church census found 720 Catholics in the state. By the 1840s, the population in the region had grown sufficiently to move Fenwick to petition the Vatican for a diocese for Connecticut and Rhode Island.

=== 1843 to 1858 ===
On November 28, 1843, Pope Gregory XVI erected the Diocese of Hartford, which included both Connecticut and Rhode Island. The pope selected William Tyler of Boston as the first bishop of Hartford.

At the time of its creation, the Diocese of Hartford had only 600 Catholics living in Hartford as opposed to 2,000 in Providence. For that reason, Tyler petitioned the Vatican to move the diocesan see to Providence. As bishop, Tyler refused a carriage, going everywhere by foot. He arranged for food to be distributed at his house every Monday to the hungry. He personally went out on sick calls in the parish. Tyler recruited clergy from All Hallows College in Ireland, and received financial assistance from the Society for the Propagation of the Faith in Lyon, France, and the Leopoldine Society in Austria. Tyler died in 1849 after six years in office.

The second bishop of Hartford was Bernard O'Reilly of the Diocese of New York, named by Pope Pius IX in 1850. He worked to secure priests for the diocese, and defended Catholics from the anti-Catholic movements of the era. He funded St. Mary's Theological Seminary, located initially in the episcopal residence, and taught the first week of classes. In 1852 he traveled to Europe in an attempt to obtain more priests for the diocese. Among those recruited were a number of students from All Hallows College, Dublin. In January 1856, O'Reilly was lost at sea on board the steamer Pacific. The Diocese of Hartford would be without a bishop for the next two years.

=== 1858 to 1877 ===
Francis McFarland of New York was named bishop of Hartford by Pius IX in 1858. Due to his declining health, McFarland petitioned the Vatican to divide his diocese. In 1872, the Vatican erected the Diocese of Providence, taking all of the Rhode Island from the Diocese of Hartford. The diocese was reduced to the state of Connecticut and Fisher's Island in New York.

After the division, McFarland purchased the Morgan estate for the construction of a cathedral. He introduced into the diocese the Franciscan Friars, the Sisters of the Third Order of St. Francis, who settled at Winsted, the Christian Brothers, the Sisters of Charity, and the Congregation De Notre Dame. He also built a convent near the cathedral for the Sisters of Mercy. McFarland died in 1874.

=== 1877 to 1945 ===
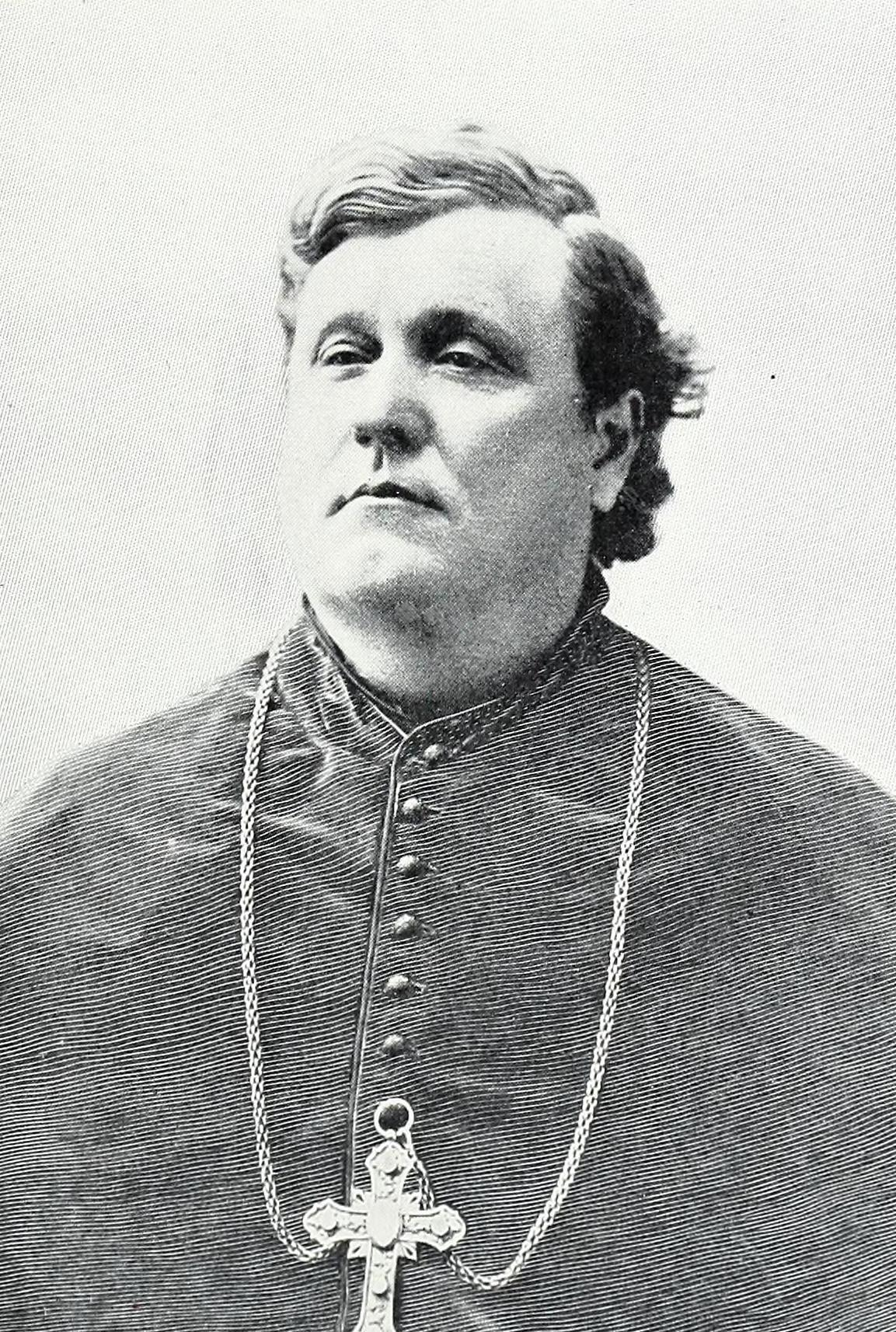
Bishop McMahon (1900)

Thomas Galberry, an Augustinian friar and former president of Villanova College, was installed as the 4th bishop of Hartford in 1877. Galberry only served for two years before an abrupt death but he was able to lay down the cornerstone of the original cathedral. Galberry was followed by Lawrence S. McMahon. McMahon had served as chaplain with the 28th Massachusetts. Under his leadership of 14 years, 48 parishes as well as 16 school parishes were established. The sixth bishop, Michael Tierney, helped with the creation of five diocesan hospitals.

John Joseph Nilan became the seventh bishop while John Murray became the first auxiliary bishop of Hartford. Murray later became the Archbishop of St. Paul.

=== 1945 to 2000 ===
In 1945, Pope Pius XII appointed Auxiliary Bishop Henry O'Brien as the ninth bishop of Hartford. The number of Catholics and parishes in Connecticut grew substantially during the post-World War II era. The pope in 1953 elevated the Diocese of Hartford to the Archdiocese of Hartford. The pope also erected the new Dioceses of Norwich and Bridgeport, taking their territory from the archdiocese, but making them suffragan dioceses of it. O'Brien was named as the first archbishop of Hartford.

The Cathedral of St. Joseph was destroyed by a suspicious fire in 1956. O'Brien immediately began plans to construct a new cathedral on the same site. Ground was broken for the new edifice in 1958 and it was dedicated in 1962. In 1965, he launched a campaign to end employment discrimination by refusing to do business with discriminatory concerns. O'Brien retired in 1968.

In 1968, Bishop John Whealon from the Diocese of Erie was appointed archbishop of Hartford by Pope Paul VI. During his 23-year-long administration, Whealon established a program to train married men to be ordained as deacons, advocated the promotion of women within the structure of the church, and developed a team ministry in which clerical and lay people administer a parish together. In 1986, he appointed Sister Helen M. Feeney to be first woman chancellor of the archdiocese and only the fifth woman chancellor in the country. Whealon also founded the radio station WJMJ in Hartford. He was active on ecumenical issues, and was chair of the Committee on Ecumenism of the National Conference of Catholic Bishops and head of ChrisConn, the Christian conference of Connecticut. Whealon died in 1991. The next archbishop of Hartford was Bishop Daniel Cronin from the Diocese of Fall River, named by Pope John Paul II in 1992.

=== 2000 to present ===
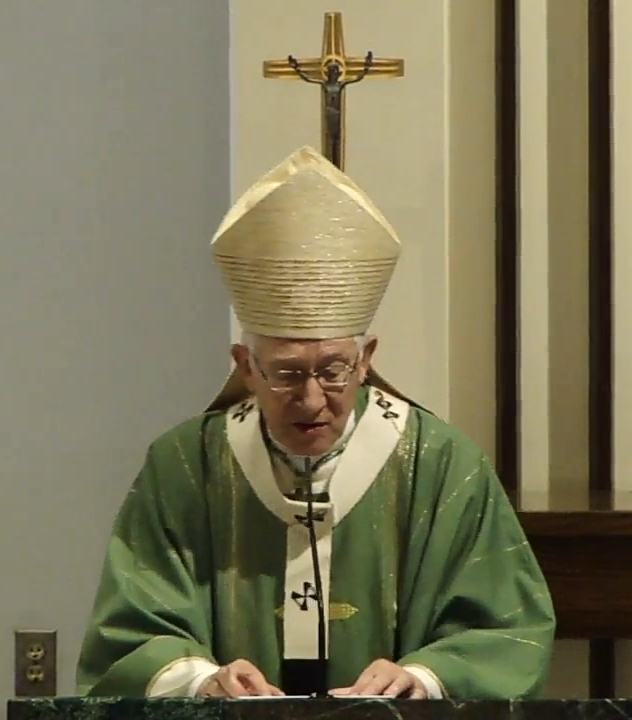
Archbishop Blair (2021)

After Cronin retired as archbishop in 2003, John Paul II that same year named Bishop Henry J. Mansell of the Diocese of Buffalo as his replacement. As of 2007, the archdiocese included about 470,000 Catholics, more than 500 priests, 216 parishes and almost 300 deacons. Mansell retired in 2013. In February 2005, Roman Kramek, a former archdiocesan priest, was deported to Poland after serving nine months in prison for sexually assaulting a teenage girl in 2002. In November 2005, the archdiocese paid $22 million to settle sexual abuse claims brought by 43 people against 14 priests, the majority of cases occurring in the 1960s and 1970s.

In August 2013, Michael Miller, a Franciscan friar who previously served at St Paul Parish in Kensington, pleaded guilty to possession of child pornography, publishing an obscenity, and three counts of risk of injury to a minor. He was sentenced to 5–20 years in prison. On January 22, 2019, the archdiocese released a list of 48 clergy who were "credibly accused" of committing acts of sex while serving in the archdiocese. The archdiocese also revealed that $50.6 million was paid to settle more than 140 claims of sexual abuse. In March 2020, a joint settlement of $7.48 million was issued by both the Archdiocese of Hartford and Hopkins School in New Haven for shielding acts of abuse committed by Glenn Goncalo when he taught at Hopkins in 1990 and 1991. Goncalo had committed suicide in 1991.

Mansell was succeeded in 2013 by Bishop Leonard Blair of the Diocese of Toledo, appointed by Pope Francis. In October 2020, Michael J. McGivney, the founder of the Knights of Columbus, was beatified in a ceremony at the Cathedral of St. Joseph. McGivney had served as a curate at St. Mary's Church in New Haven in 1882.

In March 2023, a eucharistic miracle allegedly happened during a Mass at St. Thomas Church in Thomaston where McGivney had last served as pastor. An extraordinary minister of Holy Communion was running out of hosts during communion. It was reported that the hosts self-multiplied in the ciborium. The archdiocese forwarded the claim to the Dicastery for the Doctrine of the Faith at the Vatican for investigation.

On June 26, 2023, Pope Francis appointed Bishop Christopher J. Coyne of the Diocese of Burlington as coadjutor archbishop to assist Archbishop Blair until his retirement in 2024. Coyne appeared at a press conference at the Pastoral Center in Bloomfield with his three predecessor archbishops.

== Coat of arms ==
The coat of arms of the Archdiocese of Hartford displays a red background at the top of the shield with blue and white waves across the bottom. The shield has a deer and a Paschal banner. The blue and white waves represent the Connecticut river. The deer, also known as a hart, is crossing the river at a ford; thus hart+ford = Hartford. It is analogue to the coat of arms of Oxford, England. The Paschal banner is a symbol of Jesus Christ. The coat of arms was designed by Pierre de Chaignon Larose for Bishop Nilan (1910–1934).

== Bishops ==
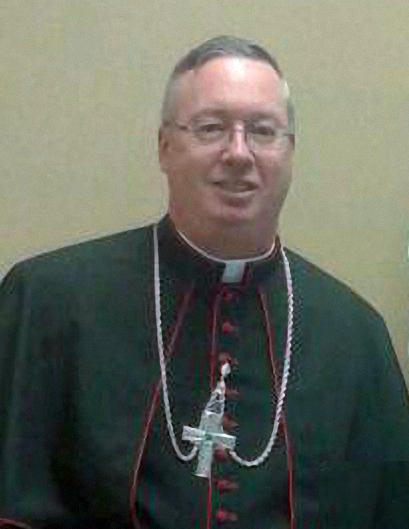
Archbishop Coyne (2011)

=== Bishops of Hartford ===
1. William Tyler (1843–1849)
2. Bernard O'Reilly (1849–1856)
3. Francis Patrick McFarland (1858–1874)
4. Thomas Galberry (1877–1879)
5. Lawrence S. McMahon (1879–1893)
6. Michael Tierney (1894–1908)
7. John J. Nilan (1910–1934)
8. Maurice F. McAuliffe (1934–1944)
9. Henry J. O'Brien (1945–1953), elevated to Archbishop

=== Metropolitan Archbishops of Hartford ===
1. Henry J. O'Brien (1953–1969)
2. John F. Whealon (1969–1991)
3. Daniel Anthony Cronin (1992–2003)
4. Henry J. Mansell (2003–2013)
5. Leonard P. Blair (2013–2024)
6. Christopher J. Coyne (2024–present; Coadjutor Archbishop 2023–2024)

=== Current auxiliary bishop of Hartford ===
Juan Miguel Betancourt (2018–present)

=== Former auxiliary bishops of Hartford ===
- John Gregory Murray (1920–1925), appointed Bishop of Portland and later Archbishop of Saint Paul
- Maurice F. McAuliffe (1925–1934), appointed Bishop of Hartford
- Henry Joseph O'Brien (1940–1945), appointed Bishop and later Archbishop of Hartford
- John Francis Hackett (1953–1986)
- Joseph Francis Donnelly (1965–1977)
- Peter A. Rosazza (1978–2010)
- Paul S. Loverde (1988–1993), appointed Bishop of Ogdensburg and later Bishop of Arlington
- Christie Macaluso (1997–2017)

=== Other archdiocesan priests who became bishops ===
- Thomas Francis Hendricken, appointed Bishop of Providence in 1872
- Bonaventure Broderick, appointed Auxiliary Bishop of San Cristóbal de la Habana in Cuba in 1903
- Thomas Joseph Shahan, appointed Rector of The Catholic University of America, and in 1914 Auxiliary Bishop of Baltimore
- Joseph Edward McCarthy, appointed Bishop of Portland in Maine in 1932
- Francis Patrick Keough, appointed Bishop of Providence in 1934 and later Archbishop of Baltimore
- Matthew Francis Brady, appointed Bishop of Burlington in 1938 and later Bishop of Manchester
- Patrick Joseph McCormick, appointed Rector of The Catholic University of America twice and later, in 1950, Auxiliary Bishop of Washington
- Vincent Joseph Hines, appointed Bishop of Norwich in 1959
- Peter Leo Gerety, appointed Coadjutor Bishop of Portland in 1966 and subsequently succeeded to that see, and later Archbishop of Newark

== Education ==
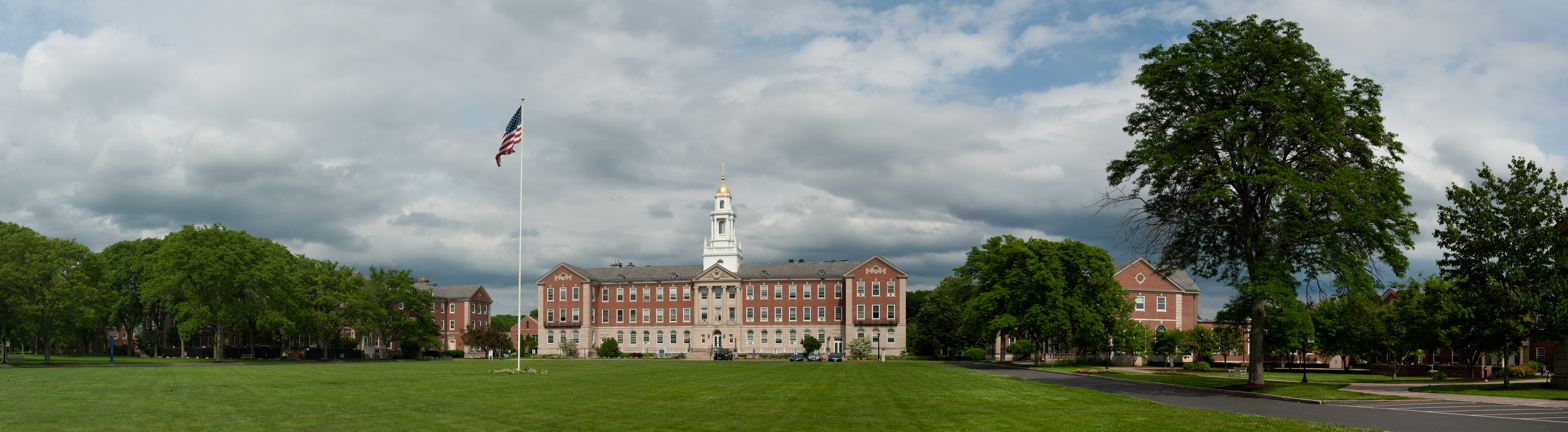
University of St. Joseph, West Hartford, Connecticut (2019)

=== High schools ===
- Academy of Our Lady of Mercy, Lauralton Hall – Milford
- Canterbury School – New Milford
- East Catholic High School – Manchester
- Holy Cross High School – Waterbury
- Northwest Catholic High School – West Hartford
- Notre Dame High School – West Haven
- Sacred Heart Academy – Hamden
- St. Paul Catholic High School – Bristol

=== Seminaries ===
St. Thomas Seminary – Bloomfield

== Media ==
- The Catholic Transcript magazine
- WJMJ radio

== Province of Hartford ==
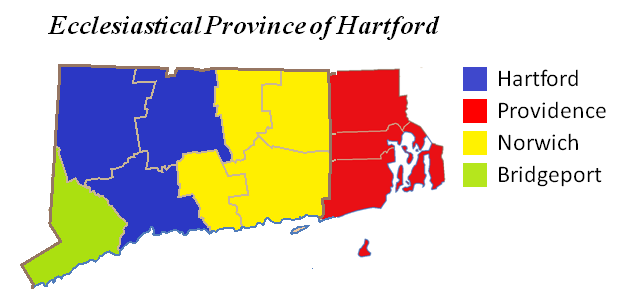
Ecclesiastical Province of Hartford

See: List of Catholic bishops in the United States#Province of Hartford
