= Henry J. Mansell =

American Roman Catholic prelate (1937–2026)

His Excellency, The Most Reverend Henry Joseph Mansell
- Archbishop Emeritus of Hartford
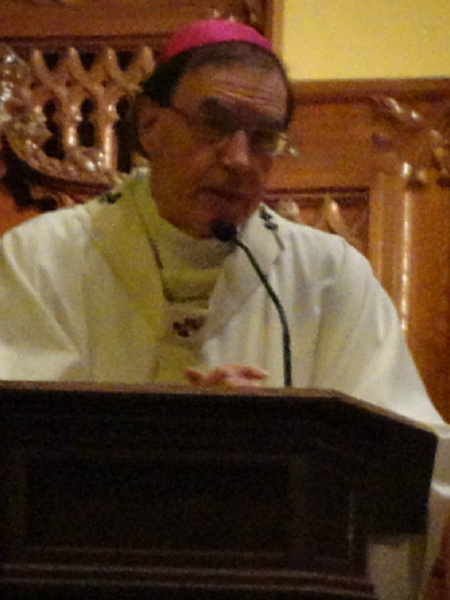
- Archdiocese: Hartford
- Appointed: October 20, 2003
- Installed: December 18, 2003
- Retired: October 29, 2013
- Predecessor: Daniel Anthony Cronin
- Successor: Leonard Paul Blair
- Previous posts: Auxiliary Bishop of New York and Titular Bishop of Marazanae (1992–1995); Bishop of Buffalo (1995–2003)

Orders
- Ordination: December 19, 1962 by Martin John O'Connor
- Consecration: January 6, 1993 by Pope John Paul II, Giovanni Battista Re, and Justin Francis Rigali

Personal details
- Born: Henry Joseph Mansell; October 10, 1937 New York City, U.S.
- Died: April 21, 2026 (aged 88) Connecticut, U.S.
- Denomination: Catholic
- Residence: Connecticut
- Parents: Henry; Bridget
- Education: St. Joseph's Seminary, Pontifical Gregorian University
- Motto: Blessed be God
- Coat of arms: Henry Joseph Mansell's coat of arms

Styles of Henry Joseph Mansell
- Reference style: His Excellency; The Most Reverend
- Spoken style: Your Excellency
- Religious style: Archbishop

Henry Joseph Mansell (October 10, 1937 – April 21, 2026) was an American prelate of the Catholic Church. He served as archbishop of the Archdiocese of Hartford in Connecticut from 2004 to 2013.

Mansell previously served as bishop of the Diocese of Buffalo in New York State from 1995 to 2003 and as an auxiliary bishop of the Archdiocese of New York in New York City from 1992 to 1995.

== Biography ==
=== Early life ===
Henry Mansell was born on October 10, 1937, in the Bronx section of New York City to Henry and Bridget (née Finn) Mansell. He was baptized at St. Augustine's Church in the Bronx three weeks later. He has a sister, Ann. Mansell attended Cathedral College in Manhattan from 1951 to 1955. He then entered St. Joseph's Seminary in Yonkers, New York, earning a bachelor's degree in 1959.

=== Priesthood ===
Mansell was ordained to the priesthood in Rome at the Basilica of Sacro Cuore di Cristo Re for the Archdiocese of New York by Archbishop Martin O'Connor on December 19, 1962. He earned a Licentiate of Sacred Theology from the Pontifical Gregorian University in Rome in 1963, and did postgraduate work at the Catholic University of America in Washington, D.C. until 1965.

After his return from Washington, the archdiocese assigned Mansell to pastoral positions in at parishes in Harrison, New York and the Bronx, then at Saints John and Paul Parish in Larchmont, New York. He was appointed director of the Office of Parish Councils on June 9, 1972, and vice chancellor of the archdiocese on July 1, 1985. On March 17, 1986, Mansell was raised by the Vatican to the rank of honorary prelate. He later became director of priest personnel and chancellor (1988) of the archdiocese.

=== Auxiliary Bishop of New York ===
On November 24, 1992, Mansell was appointed an auxiliary bishop of New York and titular bishop of Marazanae by Pope John Paul II. He received his episcopal consecration on January 6, 1993, from the pope in St. Peter's Square in Rome, with Archbishops Giovanni Re and Justin Rigali serving as co-consecrators. He selected as his episcopal motto, "Blessed be God" (Psalms 68:36).

=== Bishop of Buffalo ===
John Paul II appointed Mansell as the twelfth bishop of Buffalo on April 18, 1995. He was installed on June 12, 1995, at St. Joseph's Cathedral in Buffalo.

During his tenure, Mansell visited every parish in the diocese, most of them multiple times. He also promoted Catholic education, and health care and social service institutes within the diocese. Mansell established the Catholic Health, combining the Catholic hospitals, nursing homes, and other health care facilities in the diocese under one administration. In 1996, Mansell instituted the diocese's vicariate structure, and in 1997 he led the diocese in celebrating its 150th anniversary. He instituted a televised "Daily Mass" celebrated from a chapel at St. Joseph Cathedral.

Mansell received honorary doctorates from Niagara University in Lewiston, New York, in May 1996, from St. Bonaventure University in Saint Bonaventure, New York, in August 1996, and from Canisius College in Buffalo in May 1997. In September 2003, New York Governor George Pataki named Mansell to the State Commission on Education Reform.

In Mansell's farewell letter to the diocese in 2003, he said that, "Buffalo is a very strong diocese," and that its parishes, schools, and social service agencies "guarantee strength...for years to come." In 2006, Buffalo Business First reported that Mansell's successor, Bishop Edward Kmiec, said that some statistics were too optimistic, and that the diocese would have to close some parishes and schools to address declining attendance and enrollment, as well as a $3 million diocesan debt.

=== Archbishop of Hartford ===
John Paul II appointed Mansell as the fourth archbishop of Hartford on October 20, 2003. He was installed on December 18, 2003. On June 29, 2004, Mansell received the pallium from John Paul II in Rome.

In 2005, the archdiocese paid $22 million to settle sexual abuse claims brought by 43 people against 14 priests, the majority of cases occurring in the 1960s and 1970s. Mansell was quoted in a New York Times article stating: "[It is] part of a healing process for the persons whose lives have been severely harmed by the evil of sexual abuse and for the Church itself." Mansell was a proponent of the Traditional Latin Mass.

=== Retirement ===
Having reached the mandatory retirement age of 75, Mansell submitted his letter of resignation as archbishop of Hartford to Pope Francis. Mansell was succeeded by Bishop Leonard P. Blair in December 2013.

Mansell died in Connecticut on April 21, 2026, at the age of 88.

== See also ==
- Catholic Church in the United States
- Historical list of the Catholic bishops of the United States
- List of Catholic bishops of the United States
- Lists of patriarchs, archbishops, and bishops

== Episcopal succession ==
Catholic Church titles
Preceded by Daniel A. Cronin	Archbishop of Hartford; 2003–2013	Succeeded by Leonard Paul Blair
Preceded by Edward D. Head	Bishop of Buffalo; 1995–2003	Succeeded by Edward U. Kmiec
Preceded by Juan María Uriarte Goiricelaya	Titular Bishop of Marazanae; 1992–1995	Succeeded by David Dias Pimentel
Preceded by –	Auxiliary Bishop of New York; 1992–1995	Succeeded by –
