= Leonard Paul Blair =

Catholic archbishop (born 1949)

His Excellency, The Most Reverend Leonard Paul Blair
- Archbishop Emeritus of Hartford
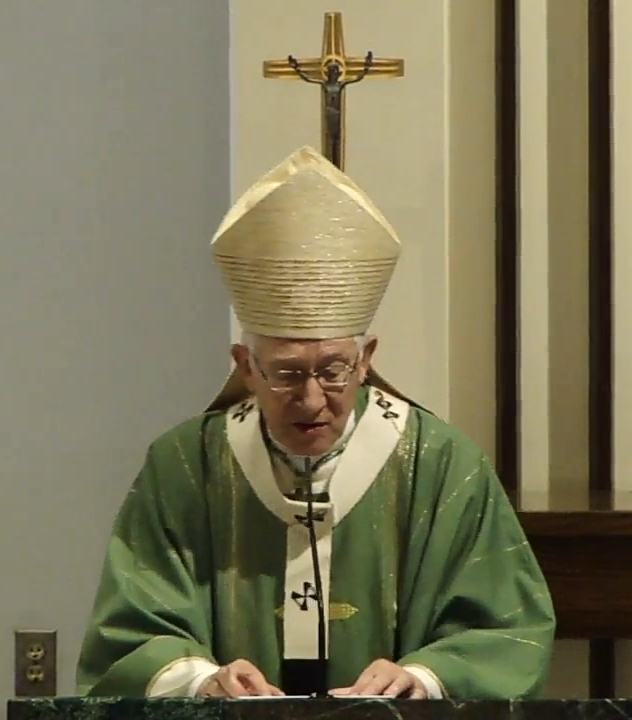
- Church: Roman Catholic Church
- Archdiocese: Archdiocese of Hartford
- Appointed: October 29, 2013
- Installed: December 16, 2013
- Retired: May 1, 2024
- Predecessor: Henry J. Mansell
- Successor: Christopher J. Coyne
- Previous posts: Auxiliary Bishop of Detroit and Titular Bishop of Voncariana (1999–2003); Bishop of Toledo (2003–2013)

Orders
- Ordination: June 26, 1976 by John Francis Dearden
- Consecration: August 24, 1999 by Adam Maida, Edmund Szoka, and Dale Joseph Melczek

Personal details
- Born: Leonard Paul Blair; April 12, 1949 (age 77) Detroit, Michigan, US
- Denomination: Roman Catholic
- Education: Pontifical Gregorian University; Pontifical University of St. Thomas Aquinas
- Motto: Pasce oves meas (Feed my sheep)

Styles of Leonard Paul Blair
- Reference style: His Excellency; The Most Reverend
- Spoken style: Your Excellency
- Religious style: Archbishop

Leonard Paul Blair (born April 12, 1949) is an American Catholic prelate who served as Archbishop of Hartford from 2013 to 2024. He previously served as Bishop of Toledo in Ohio from 2003 to 2013 and as an auxiliary bishop for the Archdiocese of Detroit from 1999 to 2003.

== Biography ==
=== Early life ===
Leonard Blair was born on April 12, 1949, in Detroit, Michigan. He first studied at Sacred Heart Major Seminary in Detroit, where he obtained a Bachelor of Arts in History.

=== Priesthood ===
Blair was ordained to the priesthood on June 26, 1976, for the Archdiocese of Detroit by Cardinal John Dearden. After his ordination, Blair studied at the Pontifical North American College in Rome. He earned a Bachelor of Sacred Theology from the Pontifical Gregorian University; a Licentiate of Theology with a specialization in patristics and the history of theology from the Gregorian: and a Doctor of Theology from the Pontifical University of St. Thomas Aquinas

Blair served as assistant pastor or pastor in several parishes in the archdiocese, including St. Martin de Porres in Warren, Our Lady of Queen of Peace in Harper Woods, St. Christopher in Detroit, and St. Paul in Grosse Pointe Farms

Blair's archdiocesan positions included assignments at vicar general and chancellor. He taught theology and patristics at Sacred Heart Major Seminary, where he also served as dean of studies. From 1994 to 1997 he worked as personal secretary to Cardinal Edmund Szoka, who was then a senior official in the Roman Curia.

=== Auxiliary Bishop of Detroit ===
On July 8, 1999, Blair was appointed by Pope John Paul II as an auxiliary bishop of the Archdiocese of Detroit and Titular Bishop of Voncariana. He received his episcopal consecration on August 24, 1999, at the Cathedral of the Most Blessed Sacrament in Detroit from Cardinal Adam Maida, with Cardinal Szoka and Bishop Dale Melczek serving as co-consecrators.

=== Bishop of Toledo ===
Blair was appointed bishop of the Diocese of Toledo by John Paul II on October 7, 2003. He was installed on December 4, 2003.

On April 28, 2004, Blair suspended the ministry of Gerald Robinson, a diocese priest, after his arrest on murder charges. Robinson had been charged with killing Sister Margaret Ann Pahl at Mercy Hospital in Toledo, Ohio. Robinson was convicted of murder in 2006 and sentenced to 15 years to life in prison.

==== Sisters of St. Francis controversy ====
On May 9, 2005, Blair directed the Sisters of St. Francis to cancel a three-day workshop by New Ways Ministry at the order's campus in Tiffin, Ohio. In stating his objections, Blair stated:

The positions of New Ways Ministry are not at all in accord with the guidelines for pastoral care which the bishops of the United States issued in 2006 regarding 'Ministry to Persons with a Homosexual Inclination.' Nor does New Ways Ministry present the full, authentic teaching of the Catholic Church on homosexuality.

==== LCWR controversy ====
In April 2008, the Congregation for the Doctrine of the Faith (CDR) at the Vatican directed Blair to conduct a doctrinal assessment of the Leadership Conference of Women Religious (LCWR), the umbrella organization for nuns in the United States. The Vatican was concerned that the LCWR was straying from church priorities and doctrines. Blair submitted his report to the CDR in 2010, noting that "The current doctrinal and pastoral situation of LCWR is grave and a matter of serious concern." In April 2012, the CDR appointed Archbishop J. Peter Sartain, assisted by Blair and Bishop Thomas J. Paprocki, to create a plan for the overhaul of the LCWR. In response, the LCWR voted to reject the CDR plan, creating a standoff. After the installation of Pope Francis in 2013, pressure on the LCWR eased and by 2015 the affair concluded without had sanctions against the LCWR.

==== Komen Foundation controversy ====
In July 2011, Blair told parishes and parochial schools in the Diocese of Toledo not to raise funds for the Susan G. Komen Foundation, citing concerns that the money could be used to fund embryonic stem-cell research. Blair stated:

As best we can determine, at present the Komen Foundation does not fund cancer research that employs embryonic stem cells. However, their policy does not exclude that possibility. They are open to embryonic stem cell research, and may very well fund such research in the future.

Blair's statement also referred to Komen's relationship with Planned Parenthood, a provider of abortion and women's health services. Because of these factors, Blair urged Catholic donors, both corporate and individually, to consider alternative organizations when supporting breast cancer research.

=== Archbishop of Hartford ===
Pope Francis appointed Blair as the fifth archbishop of Hartford on October 29, 2013; he was installed on December 16, 2013. On January 22, 2019, he announced that the archdiocese had paid $50.6 million to settle 142 claims of sexual abuse on the part of 29 priests of the archdiocese and three priests from other dioceses. Most involved the abuse of minors. Some 23 of those accused were no longer living; accusations dated as far back as 1953 and almost all occurred before 1990. He celebrated a "Mass of Reparations" at which he said that "on my knees as a bishop ... I ask forgiveness of God, of the wider community and our own Catholic community. I ask it especially of all the victims of sexual abuse and their families. I ask it for all the church leadership has done or failed to do."

Pope Francis accepted his resignation on May 1, 2024.

== See also ==
- Catholic Church hierarchy
- Catholic Church in the United States
- Historical list of the Catholic bishops of the United States
- List of Catholic bishops of the United States
- Lists of patriarchs, archbishops, and bishops

Catholic Church titles
Preceded by -	Auxiliary Bishop of Detroit; 1999–2003	Succeeded by -
Preceded by James Robert Hoffman	Bishop of Toledo; 2003–2013	Succeeded by Daniel Edward Thomas
Preceded by Henry J. Mansell	Archbishop of Hartford; 2013–2024	Succeeded by Christopher J. Coyne
