= Daniel Cronin (bishop) =

Catholic archbishop

His Excellency, The Most Reverend Daniel Anthony Cronin
- Archbishop Emeritus of Hartford
- Archdiocese: Hartford
- Appointed: December 10, 1991
- Installed: January 28, 1992
- Retired: October 20, 2003
- Predecessor: John Francis Whealon
- Successor: Henry J. Mansell
- Previous posts: Bishop of Fall River (1970-1992); Auxiliary Bishop of Boston and Titular Bishop of Egnatia (1968-1970)

Orders
- Ordination: December 20, 1952 by Clemente Micara
- Consecration: September 12, 1968 by Richard Cushing, Jeremiah Francis Minihan, and Thomas Joseph Riley

Personal details
- Born: November 14, 1927 (age 99) Newton, Massachusetts, US
- Motto: Ad obœdiendum fidei (For obedience of faith)

Styles of Daniel Anthony Cronin
- Reference style: His Excellency; The Most Reverend
- Spoken style: Your Excellency
- Religious style: Archbishop

Daniel Anthony Cronin (born November 14, 1927) is an American prelate of the Roman Catholic Church. He served as an auxiliary bishop of the Archdiocese of Boston in Massachusetts from 1968 to 1970, as bishop of the Diocese of Fall River in Massachusetts from 1970 to 1992, and as archbishop of the Archdiocese of Hartford in Connecticut from 1992 to 2003.

== Biography ==
=== Early life ===
Daniel Cronin was born on November 14, 1927, in Newton, Massachusetts eldest son of Daniel G. and Emily (Joyce) Cronin. He attended St. Peter School in Cambridge, Massachusetts and graduated from Boston College High School in Boston in 1945. He studied at St. John's Seminary in Boston from 1945 to 1949, and then studied at the Pontifical North American College in Rome.

=== Priesthood ===
Cronin was ordained to the priesthood in Rome by Cardinal Clemente Micara on December 20, 1952. He then earned a Licentiate of Sacred Theology (1953) and Doctorate of Sacred Theology (1956) from the Pontifical Gregorian University.

Cronin did pastoral work in Salisbury, Lynn, and Waltham, all in Massachusetts. He then was appointed as an attaché of the Apostolic Internunciature to Ethiopia in 1957. The Vatican named him an attaché of the Secretariat of State in 1961 and as a papal chamberlain in 1962.

=== Auxiliary Bishop of Boston ===
On June 10, 1968, Cronin was appointed as an auxiliary bishop of Boston and titular bishop of Egnatia by Pope Paul VI. He received his episcopal consecration on September 12, 1968, from Cardinal Richard Cushing, with Bishops Jeremiah Minihan and Thomas Riley serving as co-consecrators, at the Cathedral of the Holy Cross in Boston.

Cronin selected as his episcopal motto: "Ad Oboediendum Fidei", meaning, "For Obedience of Faith" from Romans 1:5. As an auxiliary bishop, he also served as pastor of St. Raphael Parish in Medford, Massachusetts.

=== Bishop of Fall River ===
Cronin was named by Paul VI as the fifth bishop of Fall River on October 30, 1970. He succeeded Bishop James Connolly. Cronin was installed at St. Mary of the Assumption Cathedral in Fall River on December 16, 1970.

=== Archbishop of Hartford ===
On December 10, 1991, Cronin was appointed the third archbishop of Hartford by Pope John Paul II. He succeeded Archbishop John Whealon. Cronin was installed at the Cathedral of St. Joseph in Hartford on January 28, 1992. He received the pallium, a vestment worn by metropolitan bishops, from John Paul II at St. Peter's Basilica on June 29, 1991.

On October 20, 2003, John Paul II accepted Cronin's resignation as archbishop of Hartford.

== Views ==
=== Abortion ===
In 1975, Cronin publicly denounced U.S. Senator Ted Kennedy when Kennedy declared that he would not vote to outlaw abortion rights for women, although saying that he did not personally support it. Cronin once remarked,

"The dominion of human life is in the hands of God. The gift of life starts from the time of conception and ends at the time of natural death."

== See also ==
- Catholic Church hierarchy
- Catholic Church in the United States
- Historical list of the Catholic bishops of the United States
- List of Catholic bishops of the United States
- Lists of patriarchs, archbishops, and bishops

== Episcopal succession ==
Catholic Church titles
| Preceded by John Francis Whealon | Archbishop of Hartford; 1992–2003 | Succeeded by Henry J. Mansell |
| Preceded by James Louis Connolly | Bishop of Fall River; 1970–1992 | Succeeded by Seán Patrick O'Malley, O.F.M. |
| Preceded by - | Auxiliary Bishop of Boston; 1968–1970 | Succeeded by - |
