= John Joseph Nilan =

American prelate

His Excellency. The Most Reverend John Joseph Nilan
- Bishop of Hartford
- In office: 1910-1934
- Predecessor: Michael Tierney
- Successor: Maurice F. McAuliffe

Orders
- Ordination: December 21, 1878 by John McCloskey
- Consecration: April 28, 1911 by Cardinal William Henry O'Connell

Personal details
- Born: August 1, 1855 Newburyport, Massachusetts, US
- Died: April 13, 1934 (aged 78) Hartford, Connecticut, US
- Denomination: Roman Catholic
- Education: St. Joseph Seminary, Troy, New York
- Motto: Dominus firmamentum meum (The Lord is my foundation)

John Joseph Nilan (August 1, 1855 – April 13, 1934) was an American prelate of the Roman Catholic Church. He served as bishop of Hartford from 1910 until his death in 1934.

== Biography ==
=== Early life ===
John Nilan was born in Newburyport, Massachusetts and received his early education at the elementary and high schools in Newburyport. After graduating from the Nicolet College Seminary in Nicolet, Quebec, in 1875, he continued his studies at St. Joseph Seminary in Troy, New York.

=== Priesthood ===
Nilan was ordained to the priesthood for the Archdiocese of Boston by Cardinal John McCloskey at St. Joseph on December 21, 1878. After his ordination, the archdiocese assigned Nilan to serve as a pastor at a parish in Framingham, then afterwards at St. James Parish in Boston. He was pastor of St. Joseph Parish in Amesbury from 1892 to 1910.

=== Bishop of Hartford ===
On February 14, 1910, Nilan was appointed the seventh bishop of Hartford by Pope Pius X. He received his episcopal consecration on April 28, 1910, from Cardinal William Henry O'Connell, with Bishops Louis Sebastian Walsh and Daniel Francis Feehan serving as co-consecrators. He selected as his episcopal motto: "Dominus firmamentum meum" (Latin: "The Lord is my foundation"). One of his first acts as bishop was the establishment of a home for orphan children.

During his tenure, he concerned himself with fostering many ethnic parishes to serve Connecticut's diverse population.

Nilan died at St. Francis Hospital in Hartford, on April 13, 1934.

Catholic Church titles
Preceded by Michael Tierney	Bishop of Hartford; 1910–1934	Succeeded by Maurice F. McAuliffe
