= Thomas Francis Doran =

American prelate

The Most Reverend Thomas Francis Doran
- Auxiliary Bishop of Providence
- Church: Roman Catholic
- Diocese: Roman Catholic Diocese of Providence
- Elected: February 26, 1915
- Successor: Denis Matthew Lowney

Orders
- Ordination: July 4, 1880 by Thomas Francis Hendricken
- Consecration: April 28, 1915 by Matthew Harkins

Personal details
- Born: October 1, 1856 Barrington, Rhode Island
- Died: Providence, Rhode Island
- Coat of arms

Thomas Francis Doran (October 4, 1856 – January 3, 1916) was an American prelate of the Roman Catholic church who served as an auxiliary bishop for the Diocese of Providence in Rhode Island from 1915 to 1916.

== Biography ==
=== Early life ===
Thomas Doran was born in Barrington, Rhode Island on October 4, 1856, to James and Catherine Nolan Doran. He received his primary education in Barrington, then attended high school in Warren, Rhode Island and Barrington. Doran then entered Mount St. Mary's College in Emmitsburg, Maryland, graduating in 1876. He then continued his education at Mount St. Mary's, taking courses in philosophy and theology.

=== Priesthood ===
Doran was ordained a priest for the Diocese of Providence by Bishop Thomas F. Hendricken on July 4, 1880, in St. Charles Church in Woonsocket, Rhode Island. After his ordination, Doran was assigned temporarily to St. Mary's Parish in Taunton, Massachusetts. In November 1880, he was sent to St. Mary's Parish in Newport, Rhode Island, to serve as assistant pastor. In 1887, while still serving at St. Mary's, Doran was named chancellor for the diocese. He was named parochial vicar in 1894. Doran was transferred in 1894 from St. Mary's to Immaculate Conception Parish in Providence to be its pastor. Two years later, he left Immaculate Conception to serve as rector of the Cathedral in Providence.

In 1888, Doran entered the Rhode Island Militia as a first lieutenant and chaplain. He went with the troops to their annual six-day encampments at Oakland Beach, Rhode Island. He continued with the militia until 1895. After St. Joseph's Hospital opened in Providence in 1892, Doran served as its treasurer and chief financial officer. In 1899, Doran was appointed pastor of St. Joseph's Parish in Providence, a position he would hold for 17 years. Pope Pius X named Doran in 1905 as a domestic prelate, with the title monsignor, and in 1911 as a prothonotary apostolic.

=== Auxiliary Bishop of Providence ===
On February 26, 1915, Pope Benedict XV named Doran as titular bishop of Halicarnassus and as an auxiliary bishop of the Diocese of Providence. He was consecrated by Bishop Matthew Harkins on April 28, 1915.

Thomas Doran died of pneumonia in Providence on January 3, 1916, having served as bishop for only one year. The Providence Visitor had these comments about Doran:

His sterling character and admirable qualities of mind and heart made him known, and most favorably so, throughout the length and breadth of the State, and even beyond its borders. Every class and creed among the population, among whom he was held in the highest esteem, can consider his death in no other sense than a personal loss.

== Episcopal succession ==
Catholic Church titles
Preceded by –	Auxiliary Bishop of Providence; 1915–1916	Succeeded by –
