= Robert Charles Evans =

Robert Charles Evans may refer to:

- Sir Charles Evans (mountaineer) (Robert Charles Evans, 1918–1995), British mountaineer, surgeon, and educator
- Robert C. Evans (born 1947), American Catholic prelate
