= Bernard Matthew Kelly =

American lawyer

- Church: Roman Catholic Church
- Appointed: November 25, 1963
- Term ended: June 14, 1971

Orders
- Ordination: June 3, 1944 (Priest)
- Consecration: January 30, 1964 (Bishop) by Russell McVinney

Personal details
- Born: May 7, 1918 Providence, Rhode Island, US
- Died: 5 December 2006 (aged 88) Keyser, West Virginia, US
- Coat of arms

Bernard Matthew Kelly (May 7, 1918 – December 5, 2006) was a Roman Catholic auxiliary bishop.

== Background ==
Born in Providence, Rhode Island on May 7, 1918, Kelly attended his elementary and middle School studies at Providence College and in his studies to the priesthood at the Pontifical Roman Seminary in Rome and the Theological College of the Catholic University of America in Washington, D.C. He was ordained priest on June 3, 1944. After ordination, Kelly received his doctorate at the Catholic University in Canon Law and served as assistant pastor and as an instructor at La Salle Academy in Providence. He also served as chaplain of Mother of Hope Novitiate in Warwick, Rhode Island and as spiritual director of Our Lady of Providence Seminary in Warwick Neck. In 1947, Kelly was named marriage defender of the Diocese of Providence.

== Ordination, resignation and reconciliation with the Church ==
Kelly was named titular bishop of Tegea and auxiliary bishop of Providence on November 25, 1963 by Pope Paul VI. Russell McVinney, Bishop of Providence ordained him bishop on January 30 of the following year and his co-consecrators were Joseph McShea, Bishop of Allentown, and Gerald Vincent McDevitt, Auxiliary Bishop in Philadelphia.

At the forefront of the ecumenical movement came from Second Vatican Council, in what he participated in its third and fourth sessions, Kelly spoke in front of an evangelical Protestant congregation in 1965. In 1971, he drew controversy when, in a sermon, he called it "scandalous that churchmen are so concerned about abortion and yet have nothing to say about destruction of human life in Laos." Disappointed with the church's position on the Vietnam War, he left active ministry on June 14, 1971. He later married and then served as director of a hospital in Florida and opened his own law firm in Rhode Island. Later on he worked as an attorney in Rhode Island and West Virginia, where he had lived since 1990; he died in Keyser in 2006.

== Sources ==
- The functions reserved to pastors. A historical synopsis and a commentary. (= Canon law studies). Catholic University of America Press, Washington 1947, OCLC, worldcat.org, (also dissertation, Catholic University of America 44).
