= Diocese of Providence =

Latin Catholic ecclesiastical jurisdiction in Rhode Island, USA

Diocese of Providence Dioecesis Providentiensis

Catholic
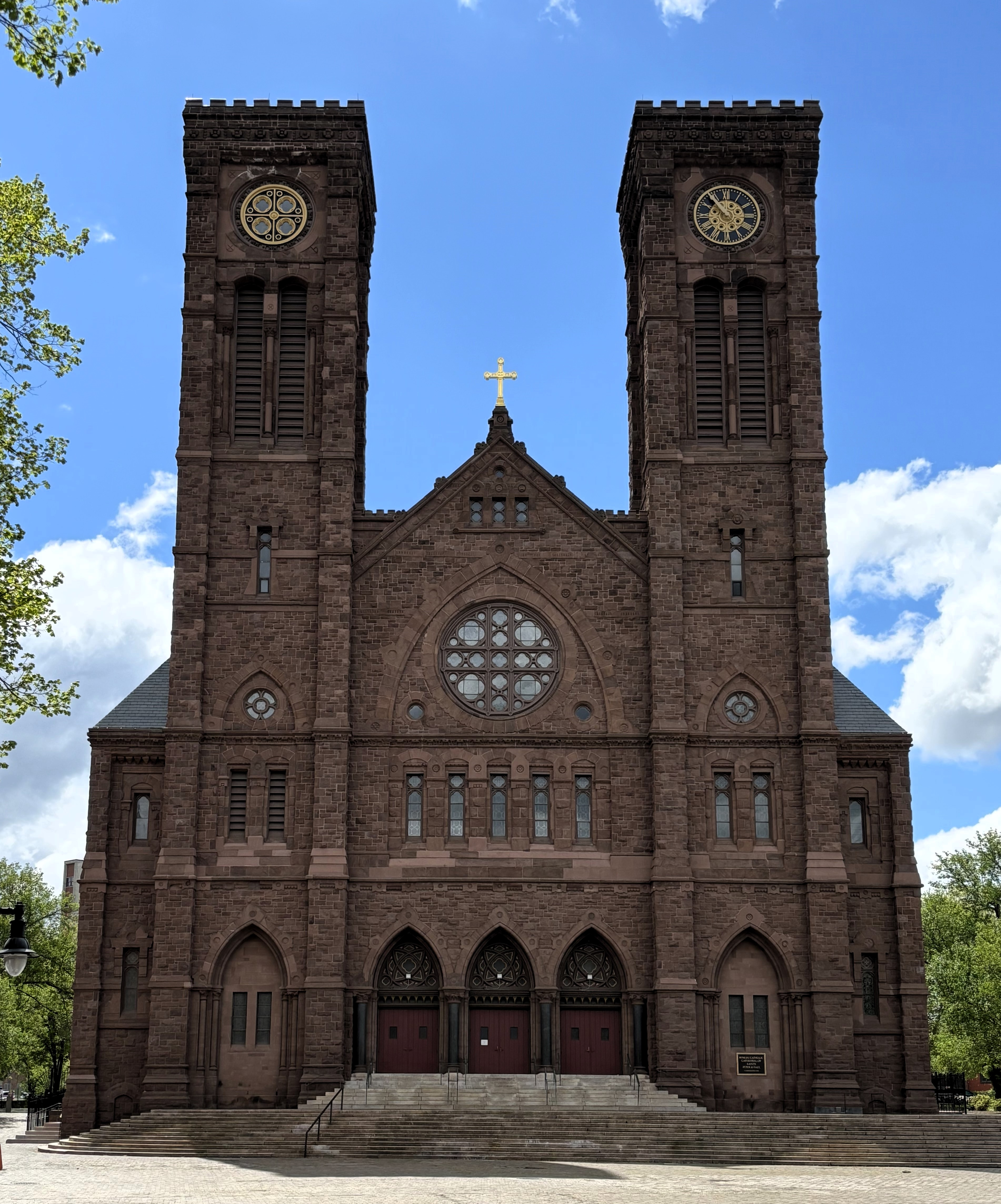
- Cathedral of Saints Peter and Paul

- Coat of arms

Location
- Country: United States
- Territory: State of Rhode Island
- Ecclesiastical province: Archdiocese of Hartford
- Coordinates: 41.8197°N 71.4168°W
- Population: (as of 2018); 679,000 (67.5%)

Information
- Denomination: Catholic
- Sui iuris church: Latin Church
- Rite: Roman Rite
- Established: February 16, 1872
- Cathedral: Cathedral of Saints Peter and Paul
- Patron saint: Our Lady of Providence
- Secular priests: 195

Current leadership
- Pope: Leo XIV
- Bishop: Bruce Lewandowski
- Metropolitan Archbishop: Christopher J. Coyne
- Apostolic Administrator: Albert A. Kenney
- Bishops emeritus: Robert C. Evans; Thomas J. Tobin

Map
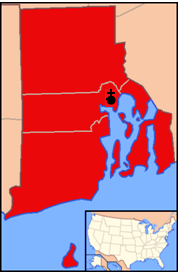

Website
- dioceseofprovidence.org

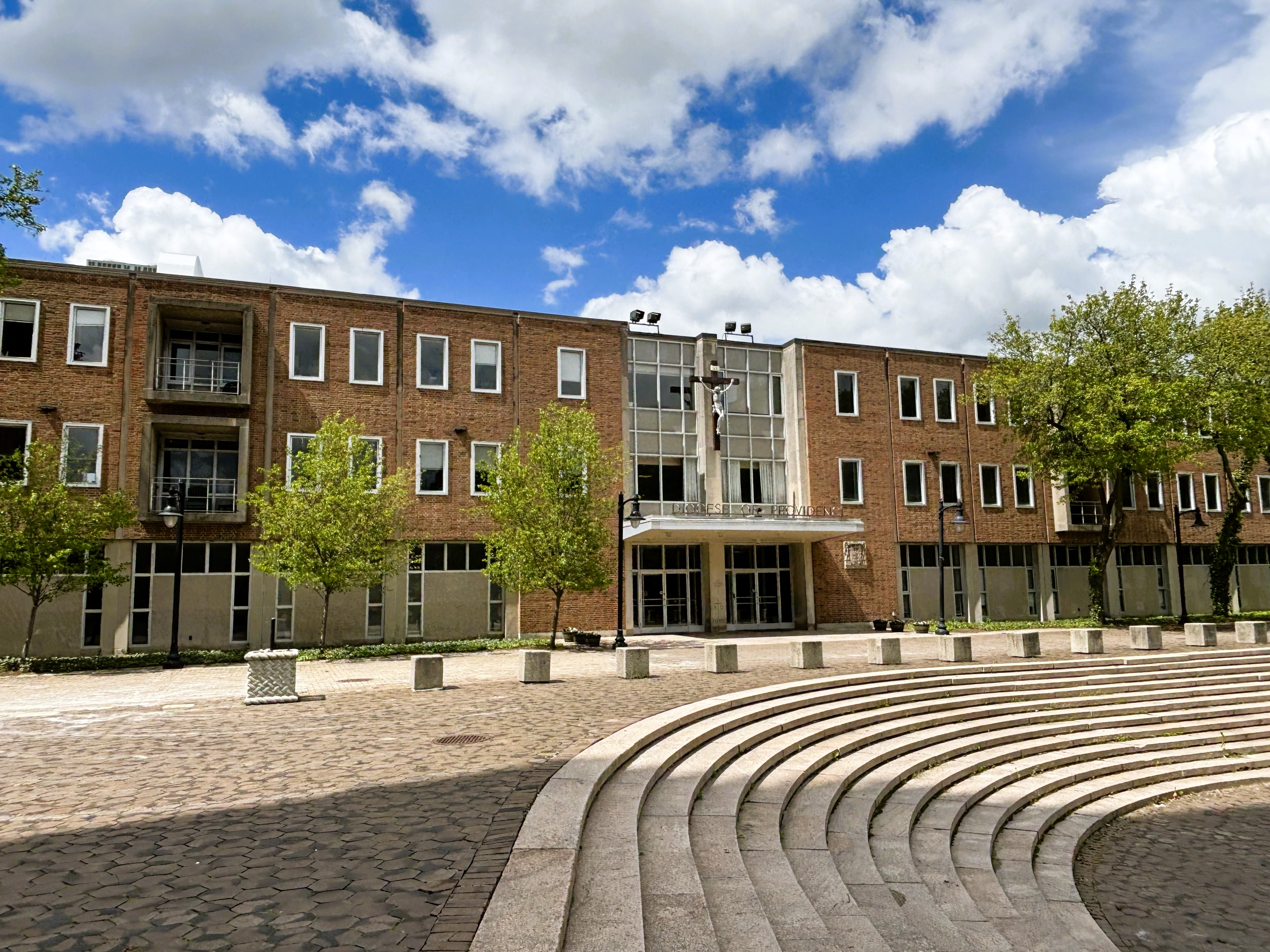
Diocesan chancery, Providence (2024)

The Diocese of Providence (Latin: Dioecesis Providentiensis) is a diocese of the Catholic Church in Rhode Island in the United States. Erected in 1872, it is a suffragan diocese of the Archdiocese of Hartford. The Cathedral of SS. Peter and Paul in Providence is the mother church of the diocese. Bruce Lewandowski is the bishop.

== History ==
=== 1643 to 1830 ===
During the 17th and most of the 18th century, present-day Rhode was a British colony. When the Baptist minister Roger Williams founded the colony of Providence Plantations in 1643, he enacted religious tolerance there for all Christians. This was in contrast to the other American colonies, which restricted Catholic worship and the legal rights of Catholics. However, by 1719, the Rhode Island General Assembly had enacted a law disenfranchising Catholics from voting to discourage any from moving to the colony.

With the start of the American Revolutionary War in 1776, attitudes towards Catholics shifted in the American colonies. The rebel leaders needed to gain the support of Catholics for their cause. In addition, the American alliance with Catholic France fostered a more favorable attitude among Americans towards Catholicism. During the revolution, a French army camped in Newport and Providence. The first Catholic masses in Providence Plantations were celebrated there for these soldiers. After the revolution, the new State of Rhode Island in 1783 allowed Catholics to vote and removed all other restrictions against them.

In 1789, the Vatican erected the Diocese of Baltimore to cover the entire territory of the new United States. The construction of Fort Adams in Newport in 1799 and the establishment of cotton mills in Pawtucket started attracting Irish Catholic immigrants to Rhode Island. After the 1803 uprising by enslaved peoples in the French colony of Guadeloupe, several French families migrated to Bristol and Providence. In 1808, the Vatican erected the Diocese of Boston, covering Rhode Island and the rest of New England. The first Catholic church in Rhode Island was established in 1828 in Newport to minister to Catholics working at Fort Adams.

=== 1830 to 1872 ===
By the early 19th century, resentment was beginning to build in many areas of the United States due to the rising number of Catholic immigrants from Ireland and Europe. In the 1830s, John Corry, a diocesan priest, started looking for a plot of land to build the first Catholic church in Providence. However, many landowners were unwilling to sell him any land. Corry eventually obtained a property and starting building Saints Peter and Paul Church, which was dedicated in 1838.

In 1843, Pope Gregory XVI erected the Diocese of Hartford, which included both Connecticut and Rhode Island. The pope selected Monsignor William Tyler of Boston as the first bishop of Hartford. At the time, only 600 Catholics lived in Hartford, Connecticut, as opposed to 2,000 in Providence. For that reason, Tyler petitioned the Vatican to move the diocesan see from Hartford to Providence. The oldest existing Catholic church in Rhode Island, St. Mary's, was founded in West Warwick in 1844. Tyler died in Providence on June 18, 1849, at age 45.

The Sisters of Mercy in 1852 opened the St. Xavier Academy, the first orphanage in Providence. Three years later, flyers written by anti-Catholic activists appeared around Providence, promoting an attack on the orphanage. Catholic leaders marshalled a force of 400 to guard the home until the threat passed.

=== 1872 to 1887 ===
On February 16, 1872, Pope Pius IX erected the Diocese of Providence, taking all of Rhode Island from the Diocese of Hartford. The pope also included several parts of Massachusetts, including the islands of Martha's Vineyard and Nantucket, Cape Cod, and the Fall River area in the new diocese. The pope named Thomas Hendricken of Hartford as the first bishop of Providence. The new diocese had 125,000 parishioners, 43 churches, nine parish schools and one orphanage.

During Hendricken's tenure, French-Canadian Catholics started migrating into the diocese to work in the textile mills in Woonsocket and Fall River, Massachusetts. Hendricken created 13 English-speaking parishes and two French-speaking parishes during this time. By 1873, the immigration into the diocese slowed and the post-war boom ended with many of his flock unemployed or on reduced wages. Hendricken oversaw the design and construction of the Cathedral of SS Peter and Paul.

Four religious sisters from the Little Sisters of the Poor arrived in Pawtucket in 1881. With $160,000 in funding from the Irish industrialist Joseph Banigan, they were able to open the Holy Trinity Home, a residence for the elderly.

=== 1887 to 1900 ===
After Hendricken died in 1886, Pope Leo XIII in 1887 named Matthew Harkins of Boston as the next bishop of Providence. The Rhode Island branch of the Society of St. Vincent de Paul (SVDP) in 1890 opened the St. Vincent de Paul Infant Asylum in Providence.

St. Joseph's Hospital in Providence was dedicated in 1892. In 1894, the Banigan family financed the construction of St. Maria Working Girls' Home in Providence, a residence for female domestic servants. The Home for Working Boys was started in Providence in 1897. In 1905, the diocese opened the House of the Good Shepard, a work house for unwed pregnant girls or ones who caused trouble for their parents. Nazareth Home in Providence opened in 1906.

During Harkins's tenure, the diocese grew to be among the largest in the country and to have one of the highest percentage of Catholics. The diocese had twenty French-Canadian parishes, two Italian parishes, four Polish parishes, one Portuguese parish and one Syrian parish.

=== 1900 to 1933 ===
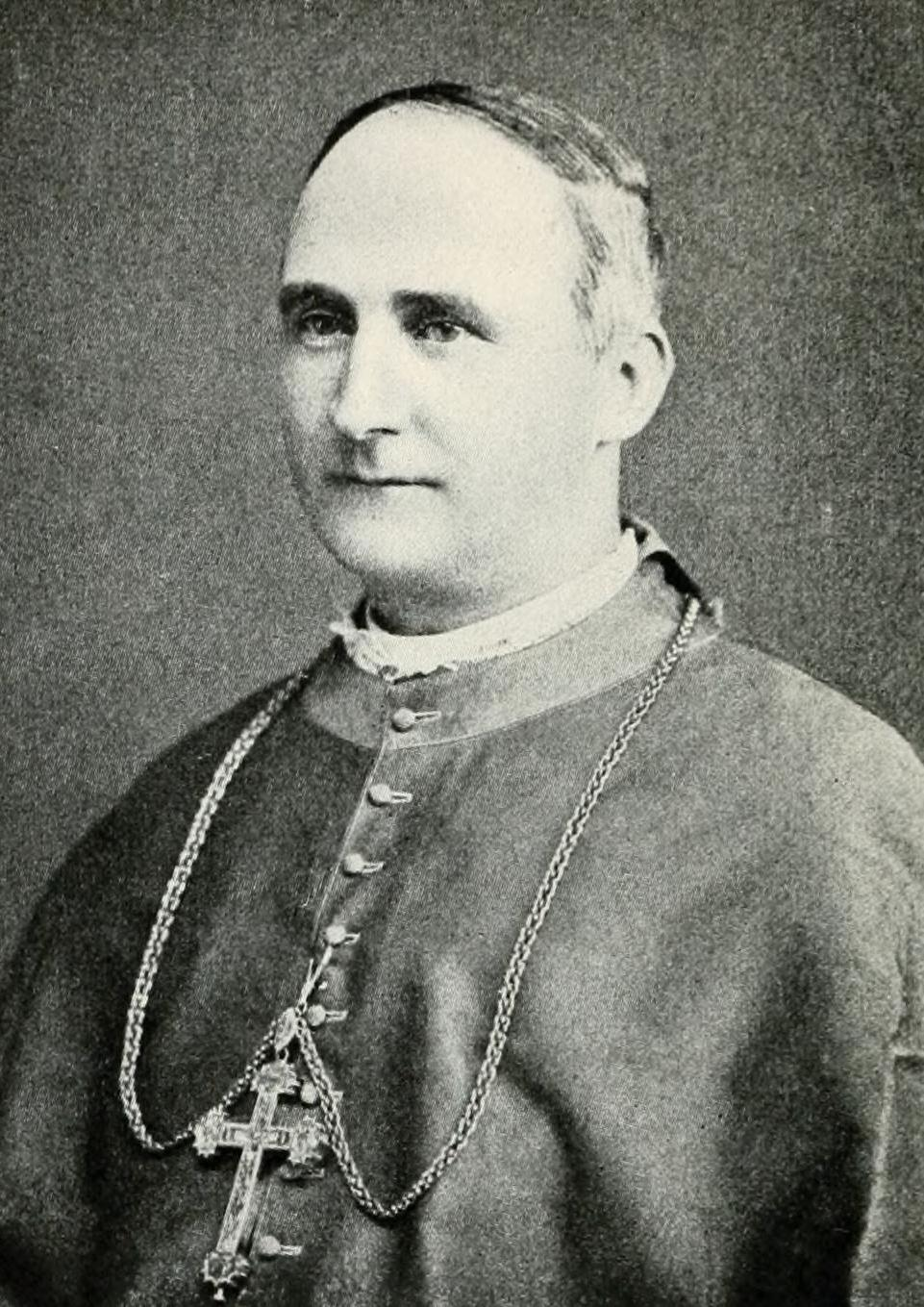
Bishop Harkins (1903)

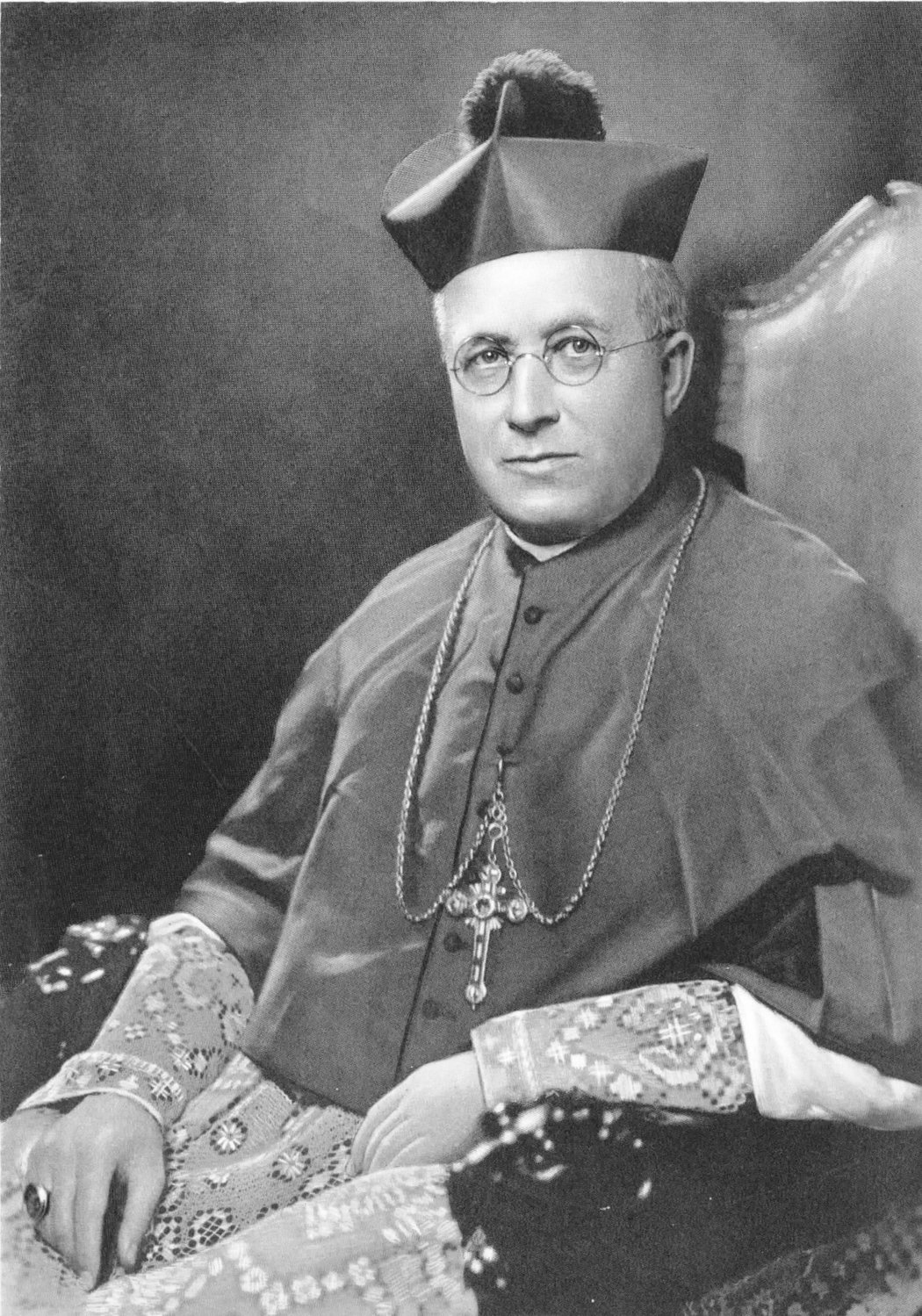
Bishop Hickey (1919)

In 1904, the Vatican split the Diocese of Fall River out of the Diocese of Providence, removing all of the Massachusetts counties and islands. This left 190,000 Catholics in the Diocese of Providence. During his tenure as bishop, Harkins increased the number of parishes in the diocese from 39 to 95; most of these new parishes were erected in the cities and growing suburbs, and were designated for different ethnic groups. The SVDP opened an orphanage in 1915 in Woonsocket. Harkins in 1917 donated land for the establishment of a Catholic college in the diocese. Most of the donations for the construction fund came from poor working families. Run by the Dominican Order, Providence College was dedicated in 1919.

Due to Harkins's advancing age and declining health, the Vatican appointed two auxiliary bishops to the diocese between 1914 and 1917. In 1919, the pope named William Hickey from the Diocese of Worcester as coadjutor bishop in 1919.

When Harkins died in 1921, Hickey automatically succeeded him as bishop of Providence. In 1923, Hickey started an initiative to upgrade and build new high schools in the diocese. The diocese soon unveiled plans to upgrade Mount Saint Charles Academy, a secondary school in Woonsocket. The academy had been teaching classes in French to accommodate the French-Canadian Catholic population in the town. However, it soon became clear that Hickey intended for the classes in the renovated school to be taught in English only. The parishioners became angry that they were being forced to pay for their children to be taught in English. Elphege Daignault, a Woonsocket lawyer, labeled the Irish-American clergy “national assassins." In 1924, the dissidents founded the newspaper La Sentinelle to express their opposition to Hickey's plan. The dissidents became known as Sentinellists.

Daignault and the Sentinellists first appealed Hickey's plans to Archbishop Pietro Fumasoni-Biondi, the apostolic delegate, or Vatican representative, to the United States. When that appeal failed, Daignault sued the diocese in state court in Rhode Island. The Rhode Island Supreme Court eventually ruled that it had no jurisdiction in church affairs. By this point, the controversy had gained publicity in French Canadian communities throughout the United States and Canada. The Sentinellists finally sent a delegation to Vatican City to appeal directly to Pope Pius XI, but he refused to see them.

In 1927, Hickey excommunicated Daignault and other Sentinellists and placed La Sentinelle on the Index Librorum Prohibitorum. Eventually, Daignault and the others recanted their opposition to Hickey and he lifted their excommunications. Hickey died in 1933.

=== 1933 to 1960 ===
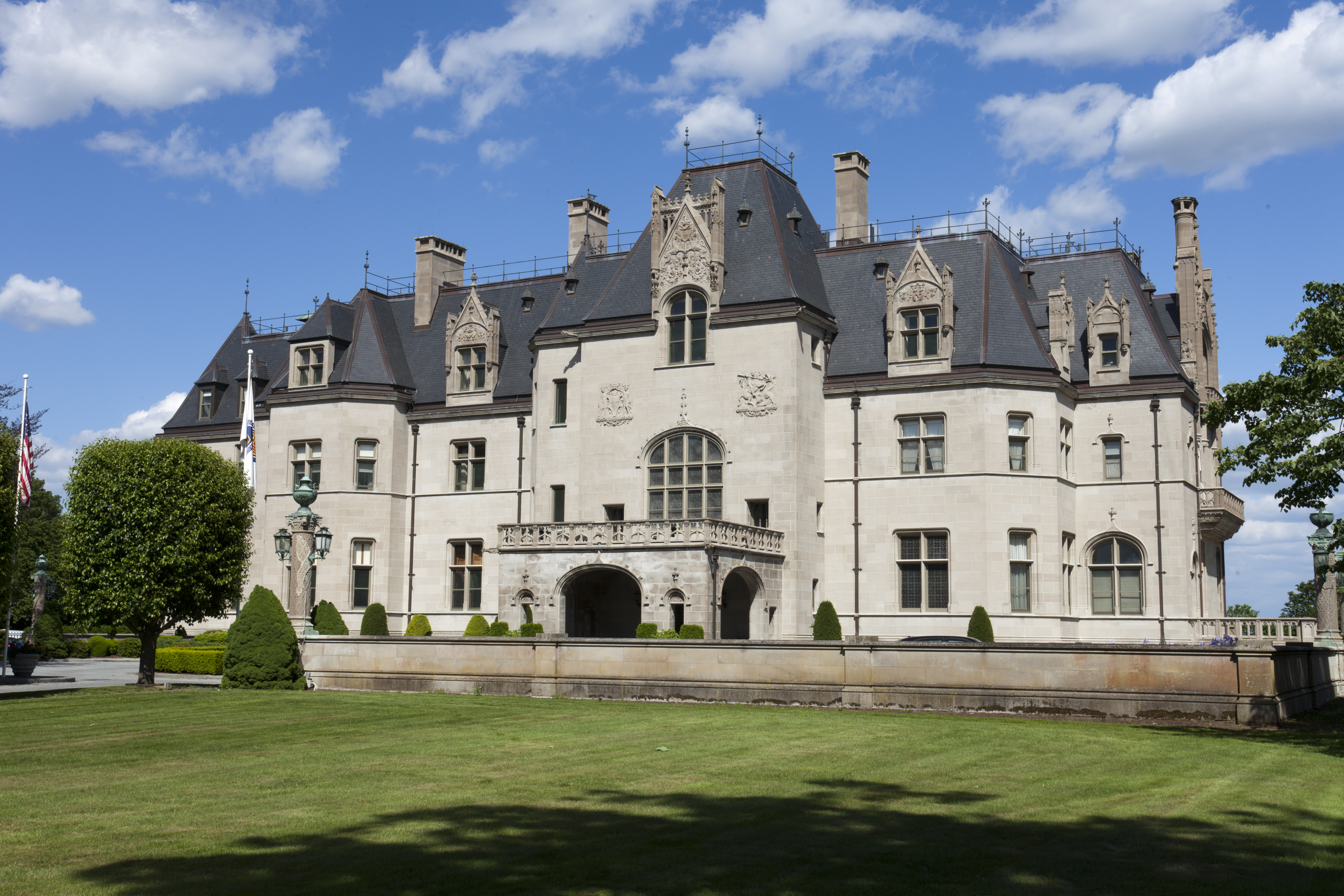
Salve Regina University, Newport, (2016)

To replace Hickey, Pius XI named Francis Keough of Hartford as the next bishop of Providence. During the Great Depression, Keough assigned chaplains to Civilian Conservation Corps work crews in Rhode Island. In 1939, he purchased the Nelson W. Aldrich estate at Warwick Neck; it had suffered damage in the 1938 New England hurricane. Keough erected the Our Lady of Providence Seminary on the Aldrich estate in 1941. In 1947, real estate developer Robert Wilson Goelet donated his family estate, Ochre Court in Newport, to the Sisters of Mercy. They founded Salve Regina University there.

During Keough's tenure as bishop, the Catholic population of the diocese increased from 325,000 to 425,000, and the number of clergy grew by fifty percent. He also founded a minor seminary, eased tensions between the French- and English-speaking parishioners, and reduced the heavy debt load of the diocese. Keough was named archbishop of Baltimore in 1947.

Russell J. McVinney of Providence was its next bishop, named by Pius XII in 1948. During his tenure in Providence, McVinney established 28 new parishes, and in 1950 opened Our Lady of Fatima Hospital in North Providence. In 1952, McVinney issued regulations that forbade Catholics from participating in divorce proceedings or attending weddings performed by non-Catholic clergy.

=== 1960 to 1990 ===
Following the conclusion of the Second Vatican Council of the early 1960s, McVinney created one of the first diocesan ecumenical commissions in 1965. He also established the Catholic Inner City Apostolate in 1966 and the diocesan human relations commission in 1967.

During the 1970 U.S. Senate election, McVinney chastised John McLaughlin, then a Jesuit priest working in Providence, for running for the United States Senate. McVinney said the candidacy caused confusion and misunderstanding McLaughlin responded that he did not need McVinney's permission to run for office. McLaughlin also noted that the bishop was "lifelong friends" with McLaughlin's political opponent, Senator John O. Pastore. McLaughlin lost the race.

After McVinney died in 1971, Louis Gelineau of the Diocese of Burlington, named by Pope Paul VI, succeeded him as the sixth bishop of Providence. In 1985, Gélineau registered opposition to an ordinance for the City of Providence to protect LGBTQ+ people from discrimination in employment, housing, credit and access to public accommodations, explaining that "homosexual acts are contrary to God's command and contrary to his purpose in creating sex."

=== 1990 to present ===
Pope John Paul II appointed Bishop Robert Mulvee from the Diocese of Wilmington as coadjutor bishop of Providence in 1995 to assist Gélineau. After Gélineau retired as bishop of Providence in 1997, Mulvee automatically succeeded him. Mulvee retired as bishop of Providence in 2005.

The next bishop of Providence was Bishop Thomas Tobin from the Diocese of Youngstown, named by John Paul II in 2005. In 2022, Pope Francis appointed Bishop Richard Henning from the Diocese of Rockville Centre as coadjutor bishop of Providence. When Tobin retired as bishop of Providence in 2023, Henning automatically succeeded him. On August 5, 2024, Henning was appointed the next archbishop of Boston. On April 8, 2025, Auxiliary Bishop Bruce Lewandowski from Baltimore was appointed bishop of Providence by Francis. Lewandowski installed on May 20, 2025.

In May 2026, the diocese announced the mergers and closures of several parishes due to the shortage of priests, declining memberships in the parishes and the deterioration of older churches.

== Bishops ==
=== Bishops of Providence ===
1. Thomas Francis Hendricken (1872–1886)
2. Matthew Harkins (1887–1921)
3. William A. Hickey (1921–1933)
4. Francis Patrick Keough (1934–1947), appointed Archbishop of Baltimore
5. Russell Joseph McVinney (1948–1971)
6. Louis Edward Gelineau (1972–1997)
7. Robert Edward Mulvee (1997–2005; coadjutor bishop 1995–1997)
8. Thomas Joseph Tobin (2005–2023)
9. Richard Garth Henning (2023–2024), appointed Archbishop of Boston
10. Bruce Lewandowski (2025–present)

=== Auxiliary bishops ===
- Thomas Francis Doran (1915–1916)
- Denis Matthew Lowney (1917–1918)
- Thomas Francis Maloney (1960–1962)
- Bernard Matthew Kelly (1964–1971)
- Kenneth Anthony Angell (1974–1992), appointed Bishop of Burlington
- Robert Joseph McManus (1999–2004), appointed Bishop of Worcester
- Robert C. Evans (2009–2022)

=== Other diocesan priests who became bishops ===
- Lawrence Stephen McMahon, appointed Bishop of Hartford in 1879
- Austin Dowling, appointed Bishop of Des Moines in 1912
- Ernest Bertrand Boland, appointed Bishop of Multan in Pakistan in 1966
- Daniel Patrick Reilly, appointed Bishop of Norwich, Connecticut, in 1975 and Bishop of Worcester in 1994
- Francis Xavier Roque, appointed Auxiliary Bishop for the Military Services, USA in 1983
- Salvatore Ronald Matano, appointed Coadjutor Bishop of Burlington in 2005 and subsequently succeeded to that diocese; later appointed Bishop of Rochester
- James T. Ruggieri, appointed Bishop of Portland in 2024

== Education ==
=== High schools ===
- Bishop Hendricken High School – Warwick
- La Salle Academy – Providence
- Mount Saint Charles Academy – Woonsocket
- The Prout School – South Kingstown
- St. Mary Academy – Bay View – East Providence
- St. Patrick Academy – Providence
- St. Raphael Academy – Pawtucket

=== Independent ===
- Portsmouth Abbey School – Portsmouth

== Publications ==
Established in 1875, the Rhode Island Catholic is the official newspaper of the Diocese of Providence. It is published weekly.

== Reports of sex abuse ==
The Diocese of Providence reached a $13.2 million settlement in 2002 with 36 victims of sexual abuse by its clergy.

In 2003, Christopher Young sued the diocese, claiming that he had been sexually abused as a minor by John Petrocelli, former assistant pastor at Holy Family Parish in Woonsocket. Petrocelli was removed from ministry in 2002. The diocese won the case in lower court, citing the free exercise and establishment clauses of the First Amendment, which prohibited judges from interfering with the practise of religion. The lower court ruling was overturned on appeal, with the judge ruling that the diocese's failure to supervise a pedophile priest was not a matter of religion.

In July 2019, the diocese released a list of 50 clerics, religious order priests and deacons with credible accusations of sexual abuse. Many individuals on the list had been removed from ministry between 1971 and 2016; some were removed after they left the diocese.

James Jackson, pastor at St. Mary's Church in Providence and a member of the Priestly Fraternity of St. Peter, was arrested in October 2021 on child pornography charges. Over 12,000 images and 1,500 videos were found on his devices. After accepting a plea agreement, Jackson was sentenced to six years in federal prison.

In March 2026, Rhode Island Attorney General Peter F. Neronha released a report on sexual abuse offenses committed by priests in the diocese. It accused diocesan leaders of covering up sexual abuse for years and failing to remove offenders from access to children. The report uncovered 75 diocesan and religious order priests with credible allegations of sexual abuse of children. House Judiciary Chairwoman Carol McEntee stated “[t]his is Rhode Island’s Epstein files.”

On June 11, 2026, Rhode Island Governor Dan McKee signed legislation into law which “amends the statute of limitations for claims of sexual abuse of a child and creates a two-year window for victims to bring otherwise time-barred claims against institutions and supervisors accused of enabling or covering up sexual abuse.” The law went into effect on July 1, 2026, and will end its window on June 30, 2028. 34 lawsuits were filed on the first day the law allowed. The Diocese of Providence opposed the law out of fear of bankruptcy.

== Arms ==
Coat of arms of Diocese of Providence
Notes Arms was designed and adopted when the diocese was erected Adopted 1872 Escutcheon The arms of the diocese are composed of three silver (white) moline crosses on a blue field. Symbolism The three moline crosses put together represent an anchor, the symbol of the State of Rhode Island. The Diocese of Providence serves the entire state. Having three crosses represents the Holy Trinity. The blue and white colors in the coat of arms symbolize two things; the importance of water to Rhode Island and Mary, mother of Jesus, who as Our Lady of Providence, is Patroness of the diocese.
