= Matthew Harkins =

American prelate (1845–1921)

His Excellency, The Right Reverend Matthew A. Harkins
- Bishop of Providence
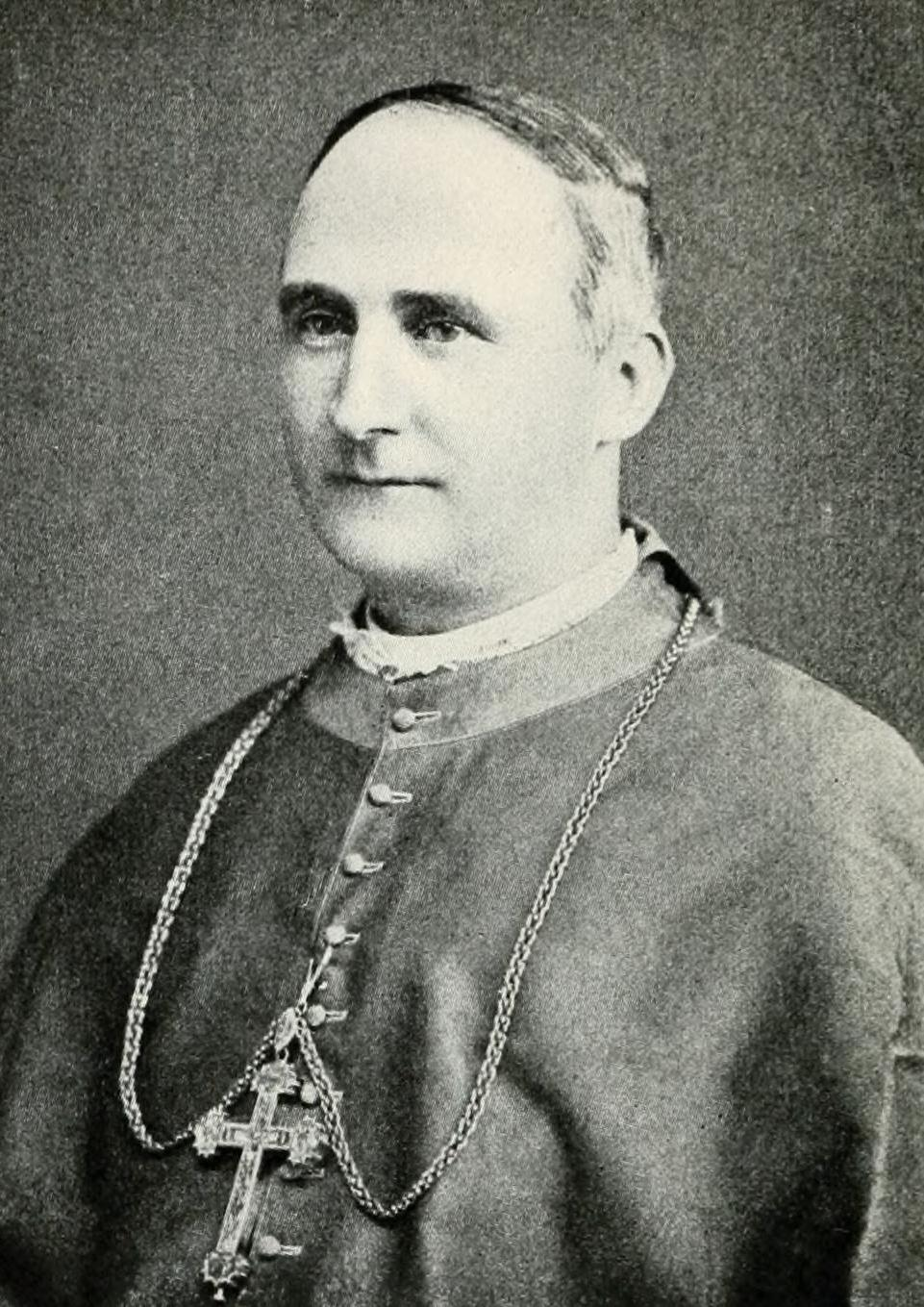
- Church: Catholic
- See: Diocese of Providence
- In office: April 14, 1887—May 25, 1921
- Predecessor: Thomas Francis Hendricken
- Successor: William A. Hickey

Orders
- Ordination: May 22, 1869 by Henri Maret
- Consecration: April 14, 1887 by John Joseph Williams

Personal details
- Born: November 17, 1845 Boston, Massachusetts, U.S.
- Died: May 25, 1921 (aged 75) Providence, Rhode Island, U.S.
- Education: College of the Holy Cross; English College, Douai; Église Saint-Sulpice, Paris; Pontifical Gregorian University

Matthew A. Harkins (November 17, 1845 – May 25, 1921) was an American Catholic prelate who served as the second bishop of Providence in Rhode Island from 1887 until his death in 1921.

== Biography ==
=== Early life ===
Matthew A. Harkins was born on November 17, 1845, in Boston, Massachusetts to Patrick Harkins, an Irish immigrant, and his wife, Margaret. He received his early education at a primary school on Tremont Street in Boston and at a grammar school in Quincy, Massachusetts.

Harkins entered Boston Latin School in 1859. After finishing there, he decided to become a priest. In 1862, he began his studies at the College of the Holy Cross in Worcester, Massachusetts. After a year at Holy Cross, he went to study at the English College, a seminary in Doui, France, and at the seminary of the Église Saint-Sulpice in Paris.

=== Priesthood ===
While in Paris, Harkins was ordained to the priesthood in Paris, France, by Archbishop Henri Maret for the Diocese of Boston on May 22, 1869. After his ordination, the diocese sent Harkins to Rome to study theology and canon law at the Pontifical Gregorian University. After ten years in France and Italy, Harkins returned to Massachusetts in 1870. The diocese then appointed him as curate at Immaculate Conception Parish in Salem, Massachusetts.

In 1876, Harkins received his first assignment as a pastor at St. Malachi Parish in Arlington, Massachusetts Eight years later, in 1884, the diocese moved him to be pastor of St. James Parish in Boston, then the largest parish in New England. That same year, Harkins accompanied Archbishop John Williams to the Third Plenary Council of Baltimore in Baltimore, Maryland, where he advised Williams on theological questions.

=== Bishop of Providence ===
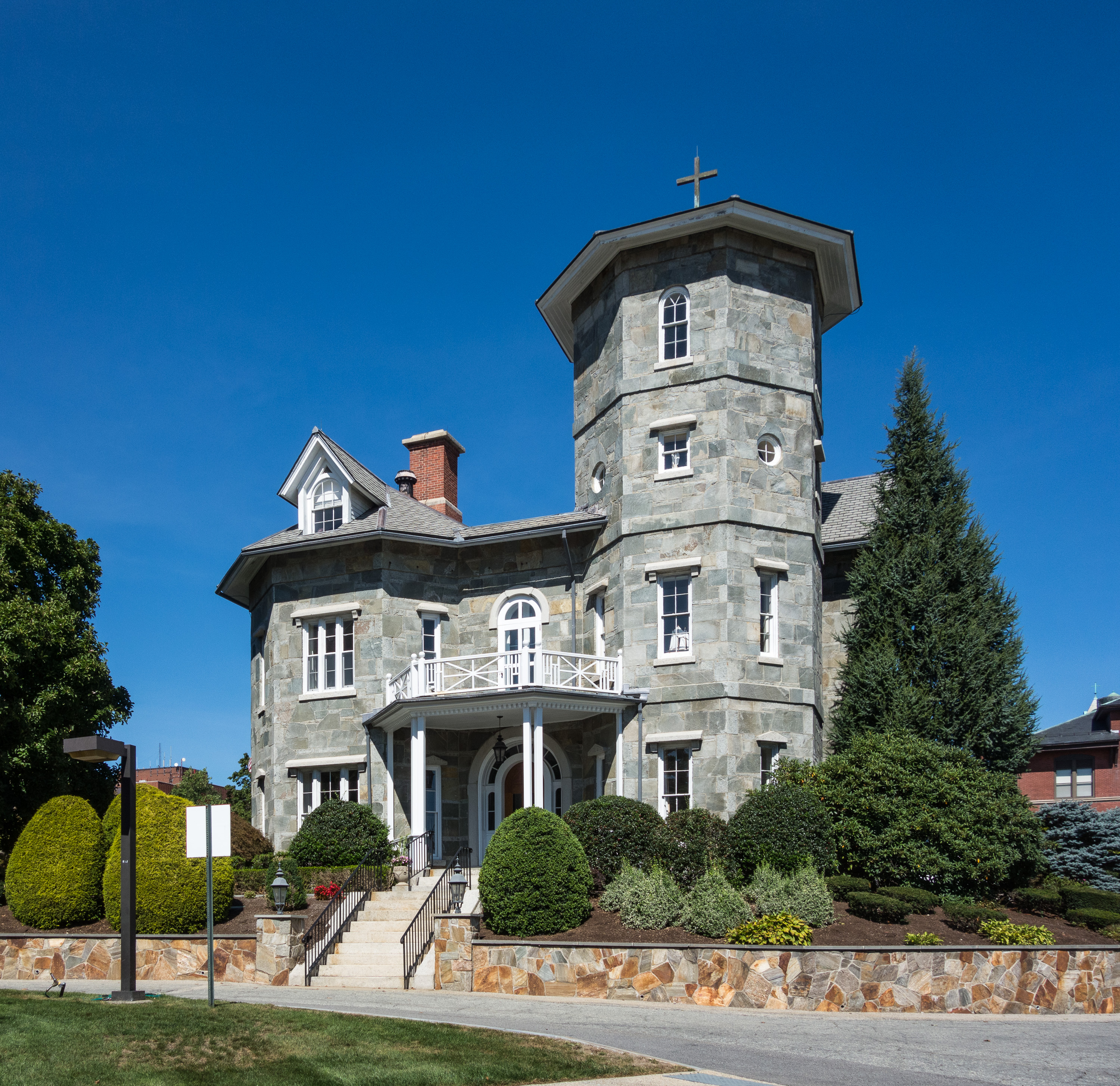
Dominic Hall, Providence College, Providence, Rhode Island (2016)

On February 11, 1887, Harkins was appointed the second bishop of Providence by Pope Leo XIII. He received his episcopal consecration on April 14, 1887, from Archbishop Williams, with Bishops Patrick O'Reilly and Lawrence McMahon serving as co-consecrators, at the still unfinished Cathedral of SS Peter and Paul in Providence. At that time, the Diocese of Providence also included the Cape Cod region of Massachusetts, along with the islands of Nantucket and Martha's Vineyard.

Harkins in 1889 consecrated the Cathedral of SS Peter Paul, which had been started by his predecessor, Bishop Thomas F. Hendricken, in 1878.

During Harkins' tenure, the diocese grew to be one of the largest in the country, with a high percentage of Catholics in the general population. In 1904, Harkins requested that the Vatican split the Massachusetts sections of the Diocese of Providence into a new diocese; the Vatican took action that same year, erecting the Diocese of Fall River.

The creation of the Diocese of Fall River in 1904 left 190,000 Catholics in the Diocese of Providence; however, by 1920, that number had increased to 275,180. Over the next 17 years, Harkins expanded the number of parishes in the diocese from 39 to 95. Most of these were national parishes for the different immigrant groups entering the diocese; They were located in the cities and suburbs where the new immigrants lived. He established numerous charitable organizations and parochial schools as well.

By 1911, Harkins wanted to open a Catholic college in the diocese. He purchased property in Providence and invited the Dominican Province of St. Joseph religious order to come to the diocese and operate it. However, the Dominicans were not ready to assume the task until 1915. They received approval from the Vatican in 1917 and Providence College opened that same year.

Due to Harkins' advancing age and declining health, plus the explosive growth of the diocese, the Vatican added two auxiliary bishops to the diocese in 1914 and 1917. In 1919, it named a coadjutor bishop to take over more of Harkin's duties.

=== Death and legacy ===
Matthew Harkins died in Providence on May 25, 1921, at age 75. Bishop Harkins Hall, the first building constructed at Providence College in 1917, is named for Harkins.

== Episcopal succession ==
Catholic Church titles
Preceded by Thomas Francis Hendricken	Bishop of Providence; 1887–1921	Succeeded by William A. Hickey
