= Denis Matthew Lowney =

American prelate

The Very Reverend Denis Matthew Lowney
- Auxiliary Bishop of Providence

Orders
- Ordination: December 17, 1887
- Consecration: October 23, 1917 by Thomas Daniel Beaven

Personal details
- Born: June 1, 1863 Castletown-Bar Haven, Ireland
- Died: August 13, 1918 (aged 55) Providence, Rhode Island
- Denomination: Roman Catholic
- Education: Grand Seminary of Montreal
- Coat of arms

Denis Matthew Lowney (June 1, 1863 – August 13, 1918) was an American prelate of the Roman Catholic Church. He served as auxiliary bishop of the Diocese of Providence in Rhode Island from August 24, 1917, to October 23, 1917.

== Biography ==
=== Early life ===
Born in Castletown-Bar Haven in Ireland, Denis Lowney's family immigrated to the United States when he was a child. Lowney was educated in Fall River, Massachusetts, and attended colleges in Saint-Laurent, Quebec, and Manhattan. He completed his seminary studies at the Grand Seminary of Montreal in Montreal, Quebec.

=== Priesthood ===
Lowney was ordained for the Diocese of Providence on December 17, 1887. After his ordination, Lowney was assigned as assistant pastor at St. Mary's Parish in Providence. In 1891, he moved to the Cathedral of Saints Peter and Paul Parish in Providence to serve as assistant pastor. Lowney was appointed chancellor of the diocese in 1894. In 1903, he left his position as chancellor to become rector of the cathedral. In 1905, he was installed as rector of St. Joseph’s Church in Pawtucket, Rhode Island.

Lowney also served as director of the St. Vincent de Paul Infant Asylum in Providence, which he worked to improve and develop. Before becoming bishop, Lowney was named vicar general. He also served on the Bishop’s Council, as chair of the board of examiners for the clergy, chair of the school board, board chair of the Infirm Priests’ Fund, and director of the Eucharist League.

=== Auxiliary Bishop of Providence ===
On August 24, 1917, Lowney was named titular bishop of Hadrianopolis in Honoraide and auxiliary bishop of the Diocese of Providence. He was consecrated on October 23, 1917, by Bishop Thomas Beaven . Dennis Lowney died in Providence on August 13, 1918, after less than three months in office.

== Episcopal succession ==
Catholic Church titles
Preceded by –	Auxiliary Bishop of Providence; 1917–1918	Succeeded by –
