= Robert C. Evans =

American Catholic prelate (born 1947)

His Excellency, The Most Reverend Robert Charles Evans
- Auxiliary Bishop Emeritus of Providence; Titular Bishop of Aquae Regiae
- Church: Catholic Church; Latin Church
- Archdiocese: Hartford
- Diocese: Providence
- Appointed: October 15, 2009
- Installed: December 15, 2009
- Retired: November 23, 2022
- Other post: Titular Bishop of Aquae Regiae

Orders
- Ordination: July 2, 1973 by James A. Hickey
- Consecration: December 15, 2009 by Thomas Joseph Tobin, Louis Edward Gelineau, and Salvatore Ronald Matano

Personal details
- Born: September 2, 1947 (age 79) Moultrie, Georgia, US
- Motto: Spe salvi (Latin for 'Saved through hope')

Styles of Robert Charles Evans
- Reference style: His Excellency; The Most Reverend
- Spoken style: Your Excellency
- Religious style: Bishop

Ordination history of Robert C. Evans
History
Episcopal consecration
- Consecrated by: Thomas Joseph Tobin

Robert Charles Evans (born September 2, 1947) is an American prelate of the Catholic Church who served as auxiliary bishop of the Diocese of Providence in Rhode Island from 2009 to 2022.

== Biography ==
=== Early life ===
Robert C. Evans was born September 2, 1947, in Moultrie, Georgia, the son of Ivey Evans and Lolita Baldisseri. After the family moved to Rhode Island, Evans attended primary school in the Providence Public School District. He then entered Our Lady of Providence Seminary High School in Providence, graduating in 1965.

Evans received a Bachelor of Philosophy degree from Our Lady of Providence College Seminary in Warwick, Rhode Island, in 1969. Evans then attended the Pontifical North American College in Rome, where he completed his priestly formation in 1973.

=== Priesthood ===
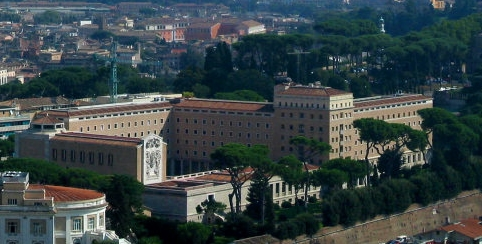
Pontifical North American College, Rome, Italy (2010)

Evans was ordained into the priesthood for the Diocese of Providence at St. Peter’s Basilica in Rome by then Bishop James A. Hickey on July 2, 1973. After his ordination, Evans was assigned as assistant pastor at St. Pius X Parish in Westerly, Rhode Island. He was moved in 1974 to be assistant pastor of Holy Angels Parish in Barrington, Rhode Island and chaplain at Roger Williams College in Bristol, Rhode Island.

In 1978, Evans was reassigned as assistant chaplain at Rhode Island Hospital and Roger Williams Hospital in Providence and as assistant pastor of St. Lawrence Parish in North Providence, Rhode Island. In 1979, Evans moved from St. Lawrence to St. Mark’s Parish, in Cranston, Rhode Island, as assistant pastor. After four years at St. Mark's, he was appointed in 1983 as administrative secretary to the bishop.

Evans returned to Rome in 1987, where he entered the Pontifical Gregorian University; he was awarded a Licentiate of Canon Law in 1989. After returning to Providence that year, Evans was appointed as vice-chancellor with residence at St. Margaret’s Parish in Rumford, Rhode Island.

In 1991, Evans was appointed pastor of St. Anthony’s Parish in Woonsocket, Rhode Island, as well as diocesan chancellor and director of the Office of Priests’ Personnel. He was transferred in 1992 to be pastor at St. Joan of Arc Parish in Cumberland, Rhode Island, staying there for five years. In 1997, he was appointed pastor of Our Lady of Mercy Parish in East Greenwich, Rhode Island.

In 2001, Evans went again to Rome, this time to serve as director of the Institute for Continuing Theological Education at the Pontifical North American College. He was also a teacher at the college.

Evans returned to the United States in 2005 to become secretary at the Apostolic Nunciature in Washington, DC. He was reassigned to Rhode Island in 2007 to serve as pastor of St. Philip Parish in Greenville, Rhode Island, and as adjunct faculty member of the Seminary of Our Lady of Providence.

=== Auxiliary Bishop of Providence ===
Evans was appointed titular bishop of Aquae Regiae and auxiliary bishop of Providence on October 15, 2009, by Pope Benedict XVI. He was consecrated on December 15, 2009.

At a November 13, 2018 US Conference of Catholic Bishops meeting on the handling of the sexual abuse allegations by the church, Evans made this defense of how bishops had previously handled these claims: "Many bishops, I would say almost everyone, did the best they could according to the best lights of the time"

=== Retirement ===
On November 23, 2022, Pope Francis accepted Evans resignation as auxiliary bishop of Providence after he reached the retirement age of 75.

== See also ==
- Catholic Church hierarchy
- Catholic Church in the United States
- Historical list of the Catholic bishops of the United States
- List of Catholic bishops of the United States
- Lists of patriarchs, archbishops, and bishops

== Episcopal succession ==
Catholic Church titles
Preceded by –	Auxiliary Bishop of Providence; 2009–2022	Succeeded by –
