= Thomas Francis Hendricken =

Irish-born American prelate

His Excellency, The Right Reverend Thomas Francis Hendricken
- Bishop of Providence
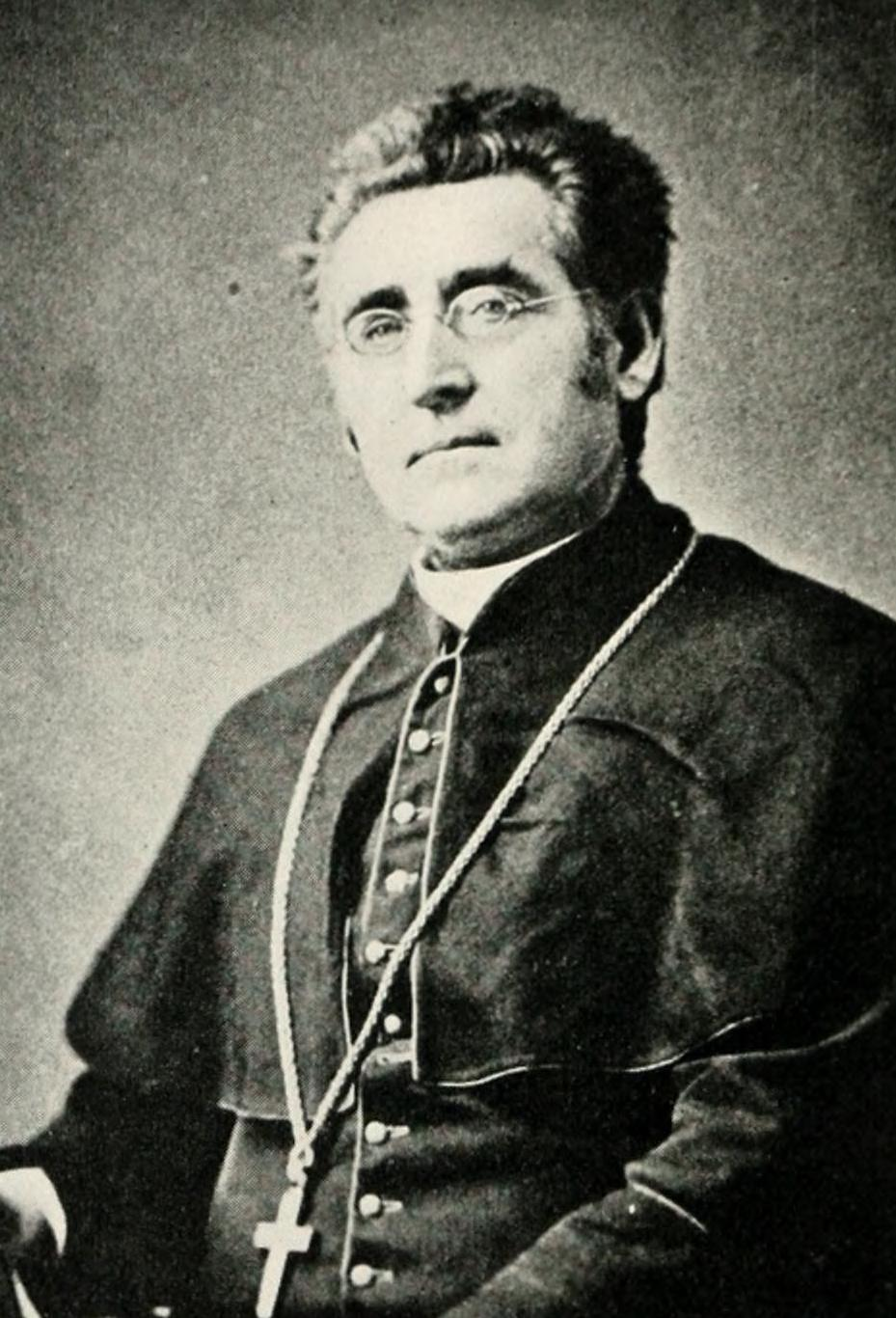
- Church: Catholic
- Diocese: Diocese of Providence
- Successor: Matthew Harkins

Orders
- Ordination: April 25, 1853 by Bernard O'Reilly
- Consecration: April 28, 1872 by John McCloskey

Personal details
- Born: May 5, 1827 Kilkenny, Ireland
- Died: June 11, 1886 (aged 59) Providence, Rhode Island, US
- Education: St Kieran's College
- Motto: Melior sapientia cunctis (Greater wisdom than all)

Thomas Francis Hendricken (May 5, 1827 – June 11, 1886) was an Irish-born American Catholic prelate who served as the first bishop of Providence in Rhode Island from 1872 until his death in 1886. Hendricken started the construction of the current Saints Peter and Paul Cathedral.

== Biography ==
=== Early life ===
Thomas Hendricken was born on May 5, 1827, in Kilkenny, Ireland, the third child of John and Anne Meagher Hendricken. His father was a farmer; his paternal grandfather was a German soldier who fought at the 1690 Battle of the Boyne in Ireland. After John Hendricken died in 1835, his brother helped Thomas Hendricken fund his education. Hendricken in 1844 entered St Kieran's College in Kilkenny, where he studied English Literature.

Deciding to become a priest, Hendricken then enrolled in 1847 at St Patrick's College in Maynooth, then the Irish national seminary for priests. Hendricken's goal after ordination was to enter the Society of Jesus and serve as a missionary in China or Japan.

During the 19th century, American bishops were actively recruiting young Irish priests to serve the growing number of parishes in the United States. Bishop Bernard O'Reilly met Hendricken at St. Patrick's and persuaded him to immigrate to the United States and serve in the Diocese of Hartford. The diocese in 1853, which contained few Catholics, consisted of the states of Connecticut and Rhode Island.

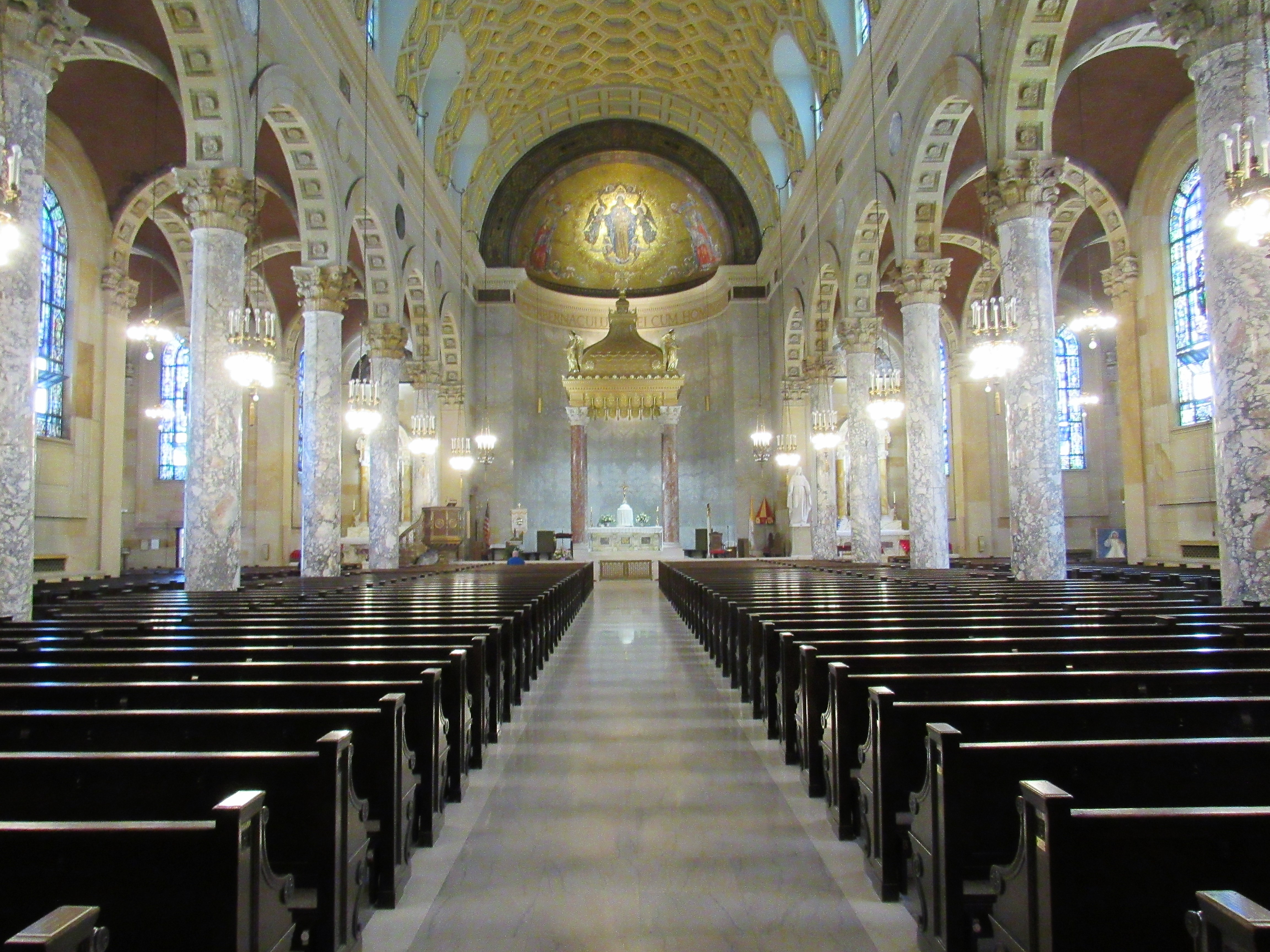
Interior of the Basilica of the Immaculate Conception, Waterbury, Connecticut (2019)

=== Priesthood ===
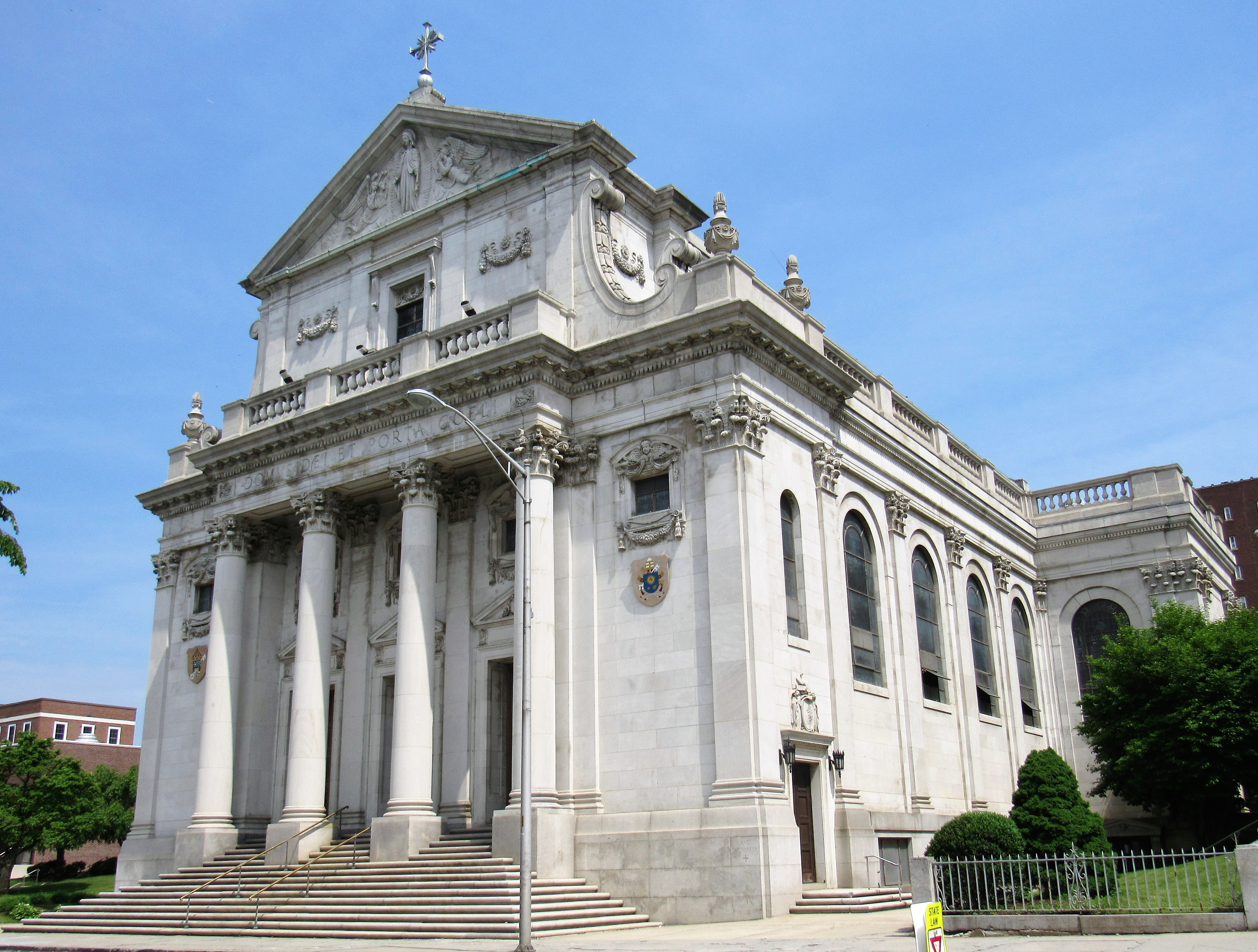
Basilica of the Immaculate Conception, Waterbury, Connecticut (2019)

O'Reilly ordained Hendricken to the priesthood on April 25, 1853, at All Hallows College in Dublin.Hendricken later boarded the steamer Columbia sailing to the New York City. The American ship captain belonged to the Know Nothing Party, a virulently anti-Catholic movement in the United States. During the voyage, he prohibited Hendricken from acting as a priest or wearing priestly garb. However, Hendricken disobeyed him by entering the steerage area to administer the last rites to a dying woman. When the captain heard about this, he declared "The papist shall never see New York alive."

The ship crew then beat Hendricken unconscious and was ready to throw him overboard. However, Reverend Samuel Davies, a Protestant German clergyman, and his followers intervened. Davies then tended to Hendricken's wounds and guarded him until the Columbia reached New York City in July 1853. Davies became a lifelong friend of Hendricken, who would later aid him in his charitable projects.

After Hendricken arrived in Providence, Rhode Island, the diocese assigned Hendricken as a curate at the Cathedral of Saints Peter and Paul Parish in that city. After five months at the cathedral, the diocese transferred him to St. Charles Borromeo Parish in Woonsocket, Rhode Island, and St. Mary's Parish in Newport, Rhode Island.

In early 1854, Hendricken was appointed pastor of St. Joseph's Parish in West Winsted, Connecticut. A talented administrator, Hendricken quickly retired the parish debt and purchased more properties for its expansion. In July 1854, the diocese dispatched him to St. Patrick Parish in Waterbury, Connecticut to serve as its pastor. His sister Catherine and brother William later joined him in Waterbury.

Hendricken quickly decided that St. Patrick needed a larger new church to serve the growing population of Catholic immigrants. He hired the architect Patrick Keely, a designer of Catholic churches throughout the United States, to design what would become the Church of the Immaculate Conception. It was dedicated in 1857 and became a minor basilica in 2008.

The growing number of French-Canadian Catholics in Immaculate Conception Parish moved Hendricken to establish a French-language school. At that time, different ethnic groups felt more comfortable in parishes that shared their culture and language. In 1869, Hendricken persuaded the Congregation of Notre Dame of Montreal to send a contingent of French-speaking religious sisters to Waterbury. They established Notre Dame Academy, a day and boarding school for girls. Hendricken also purchased land to create St. Joseph's Cemetery in West Warwick, Rhode Island.

In 1868, Hendricken traveled by train with 16 year-old Michael J. McGivney, a parishioner at Immaculate Conception, to Saint Hyacinth, Quebec. Hendricken had influenced McGivney to become a priest and he was now entering the Séminaire de Saint-Hyacinthe. McGivney was later ordained and founded the Knights of Columbus in 1882; he was beatified by the Vatican in 2020. Pope Pius IX in 1868 awarded Hendricken a Doctorate of Divinity. In 1870, Hendricken became a naturalized American citizen.

=== Bishop of Providence ===
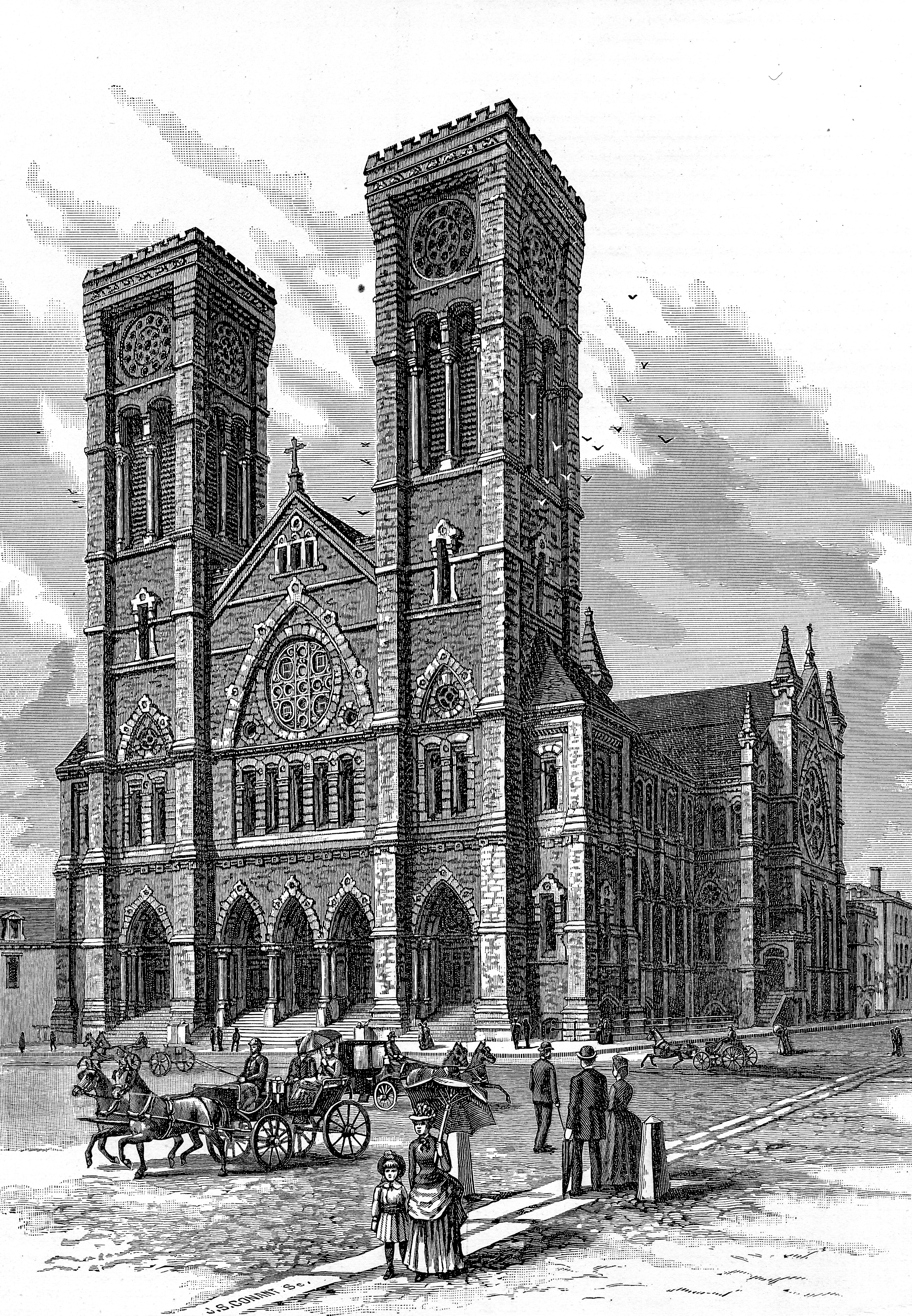
Cathedral of Sts. Peter and Paul, Providence, Rhode Island (1886)

On February 16, 1872, Hendricken was appointed the first bishop of the new Diocese of Providence. He was consecrated by Cardinal John McCloskey at the first Cathedral of Saints Peter and Paul in Providence on April 28, 1872. At that time, the diocese included all of Rhode Island, as well as the present Diocese of Fall River and the islands of Martha's Vineyard and Nantucket, all in Massachusetts.

During the 1860s, Rhode Island was experiencing explosive growth as Irish and French-Canadian immigrants arrived to work in the mills and factories. The new diocese had 125,000 parishioners, 43 churches, nine parish schools and one orphan asylum. By 1873, the immigration into the diocese had slowed and the economic boom sparked by the end of the American Civil War was over; many members of the diocese were unemployed or on reduced wages.

Soon after becoming bishop, Hendricken began fundraising to construct a new Cathedral of SS Peter and Paul. The current cathedral was too small and was falling apart after only 40 years of use. He raised $30,000 to construct a temporary pro-cathedral to accommodate 2,000 worshippers and demolished the old cathedral in 1876. He again hired Keely to design the new building. Hendricken laid the cornerstone for the new cathedral in 1878. However, understanding the economy at that time, he refused to borrow money to construct the building, lengthening its time of construction to 11 years.

=== Death and legacy ===
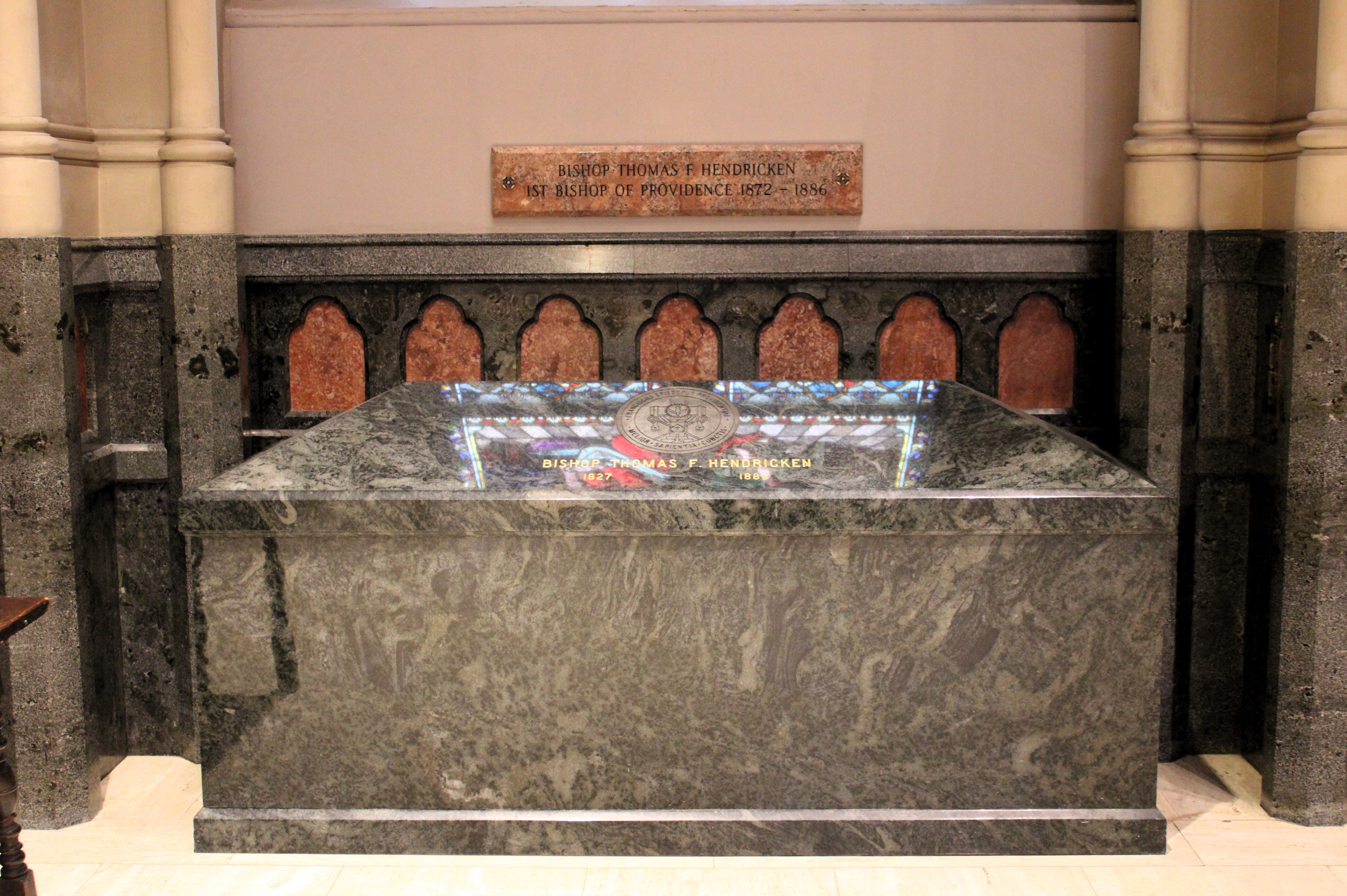
Bishop Hendricken sarcophagus in the Cathedral of Saints Peter and Paul (2024)

Thomas Hendricken died at his episcopal residence in Providence on June 11, 1886, at age 59. The archdiocese opened the unfinished cathedral for his funeral service and he was entombed in a crypt beneath the high altar. The Cathedral of Saints Peter and Paul was finally consecrated in 1889.Bishop Hendricken High School in Warwick, Rhode Island is named after him.

During the renovations of Saints Peter and Paul Cathedral in 2006, the diocese removed the basement crypt and re-interred the bishops' remains in a mausoleum at a diocesan cemetery. In December 2006, during a reinterment ceremony, six students from Bishop Hendricken High School carried a casket holding Hendricken's remains into the cathedral. The remain are now interred in a sarcophagus facing the high altar.

== Episcopal succession ==
Catholic Church titles
New diocese	Bishop of Providence; 1872–1886	Succeeded by Matthew Harkins
