= Cathedral of Saints Peter and Paul (Providence, Rhode Island) =

Historic church in Rhode Island, United States

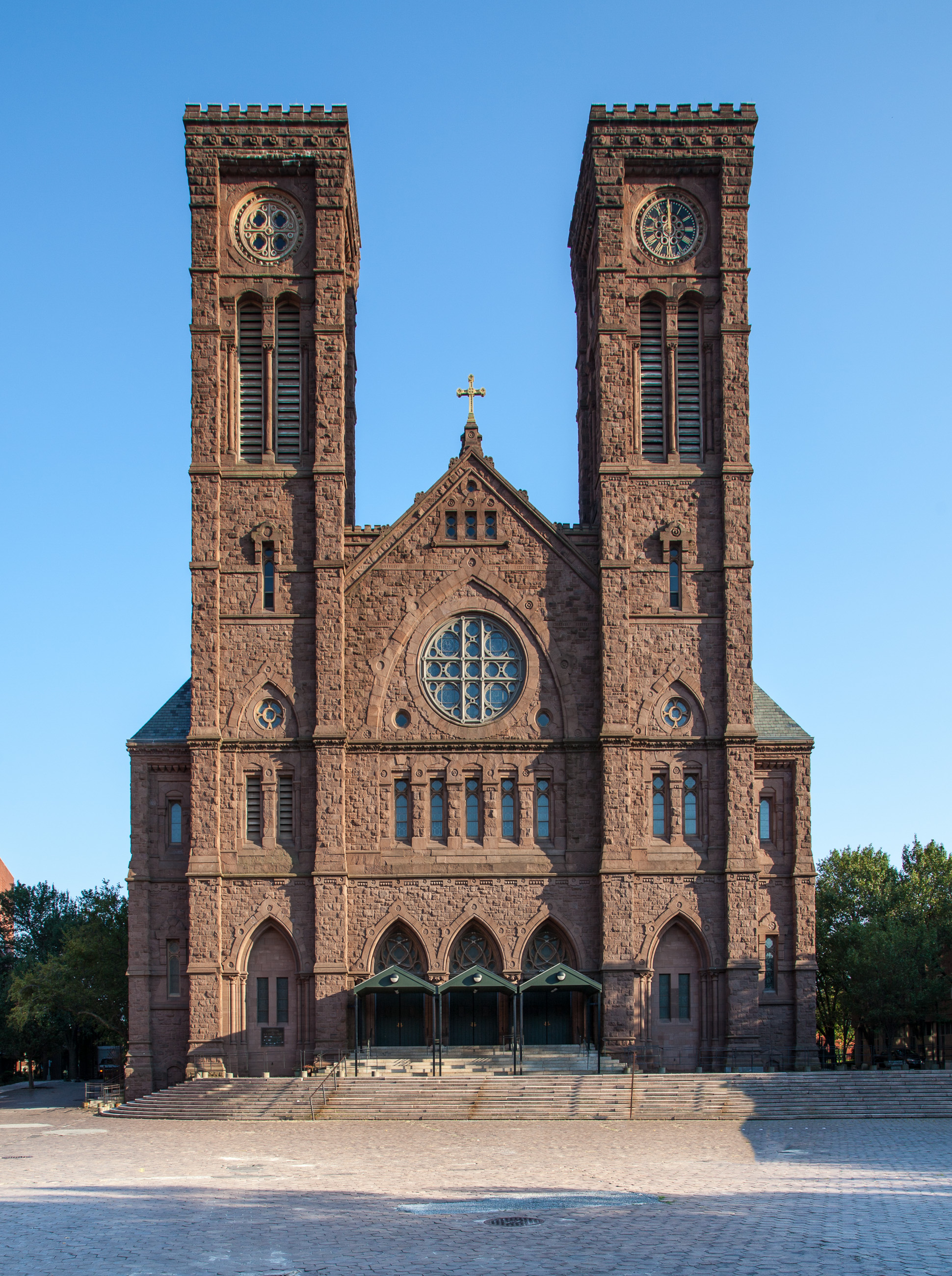
- Cathedral of Saints Peter and Paul
- Location: 30 Fenner Street; Providence, Rhode Island
- Country: United States
- Denomination: Roman Catholic
- Website: www.providencecathedral.org

History
- Status: Cathedral
- Consecrated: June 30, 1889

Architecture
- Functional status: Active
- Architect: Patrick C. Keely
- Style: Romanesque Revival; Gothic Revival
- Groundbreaking: 1878

Administration
- Province: Hartford
- Diocese: Providence

Clergy
- Bishop: Most Rev. Bruce Lewandowski
- Rector: Rev. Msgr. Anthony Mancini
- Cathedral of Saints Peter and Paul
- U.S. National Register of Historic Places
- Location within Rhode Island Location within the United States
- Location: Providence, Rhode Island
- Coordinates: 41°49′9″N 71°25′1″W
- NRHP reference No.: 75000057
- Added to NRHP: February 10, 1975

The Cathedral of Saints Peter and Paul is a Roman Catholic cathedral in the Cathedral Square neighborhood of Providence, Rhode Island, in the United States. It is the mother church of the Diocese of Providence. The Neo-Romanesque church was designed in 1873 by Patrick Keely and added to the National Register of Historic Places in 1975.

== History ==
=== Sts. Peter and Paul Church ===
During the first decades of the 19th century, the few Catholics in Rhode Island were under the jurisdiction of the Diocese of Boston. The diocese assigned John Corry to serve as a missionary priest in Providence. He purchased a property to build the first Catholic church in the city. The Church of Saints Peter and Paul was dedicated on November 4, 1938.As Rhode Island began to industrialized, more Catholic workers started moving into the area.

In 1844, Pope Gregory XVI erected the Diocese of Hartford, including the Catholics in Connecticut and Rhode Island. Its first bishop, William Tyler, elected to reside in Providence, as it had a much larger Catholic population than Hartford.

=== First Sts. Peter and Paul Cathedral ===
Tyler consecrated Sts. Peter and Paul Church as Sts. Peter and Paul Cathedral in 1847.As the number of Catholics in Providence continued to grow, the first Sts. Peter and Paul Cathedral could not accommodate them.By 1872, the Catholic population in the diocese had grown to 200,000. Bishop Francis Patrick McFarland expressed interest in building a larger cathedral, but was unable to gain support within the diocese.

Pope Pius IX in 1872 established the Diocese of Providence, encompassing Rhode Island and parts of Massachusetts. Thomas Francis Hendricken became the first bishop of Providence.

Hendricken decided to build a new cathedral, but was forced to retire the diocesan debt of $16,000. After a few months, he began planning the project. In 1873, Hendricken selected church architect Patrick Keely to draw up the plans for the new cathedral. Hendricken signed a contract of $18,950 to construct the foundation of a temporary church. The diocese demolished the existing rectory and built a new one at a different location.

The cornerstone for the new cathedral was laid in 1878. As construction slowly continued, Hendricken set aside $10,000 each year toward the building fund. He also mounted a series of fundraising campaigns to keep construction going as he refused to borrow money to finance it.

By 1882, the contractors had finished the cathedral roof and began work on the interior. Hendricken died in 1886; his funeral mass was the first to be celebrated in the unfinished cathedral. At the time of his death, construction costs for the cathedral totaled $300,000.

=== Second Sts. Peter and Paul Cathedral ===
On June 30, 1889, more than a decade after construction began, the second Sts. Peter and Paul Cathedral was consecrated by Bishop Matthew Harkins. In 1921, the diocese painted walls in the cathedral.

Bishop Russell J. McVinney in 1968 initiated the first major renovation of the cathedral, a three-year project. The sandstone facing on the exterior was repaired, the sanctuary lengthened and the altar repositioned. The diocese also installed new pews and a new pipe organ.

In 2006, the basement of the cathedral, which holds the church hall, was renovated to accommodate parish gatherings and diocesan functions. The basement crypt was dismantled and a new stone tomb was laid in the upper church as a final resting place for Hendricken. Church leaders believed that he deserved a more prominent place in the building, as the cathedral is considered his legacy. The other bishops buried in the crypt were moved to a cemetery in nearby Cranston.

In 2013, the diocese constructed a cross aisle in the cathedral and replaced the flooring and kneelers. Over $200,000 was spent reglazing the rose windows and repairing the tower clock.

The diocese, in June 2021, completed a $4.5 million replacement of the cathedral roof. During that period, the contractors discovered serious structural problems with the two towers. The diocese was forced to spend an additional $9.5 million to replace 800 stones on the towers, along with weakened timbers and mortar.

=== Notable masses ===
- June 16, 1886 – Bishop Hendricken
- September 8, 1947 – Knut Ansgar Nelson, a Benedictine monk from Portsmouth Priory who had been named the coadjutor vicar apostolic of Sweden. He was consecrated by Amleto Giovanni Cicognani, apostolic delegate to the United States.
- September 17, 2001 – David Angell and his wife Lynn Edwards Angell. They were passengers on the American Airlines Flight 11 that was flown by terrorists into the North Tower of the World Trade Center in New York City on September 11, 2001. The mass was celebrated by David's older brother, Bishop Kenneth Angell.
- February 8, 2016 – former Providence mayor Buddy Cianci, presided over by Bishop Thomas Joseph Tobin.
- August 29, 2025 – former Judge Frank Caprio, presided over by Bishop Richard Henning.

== Cathedral interior ==
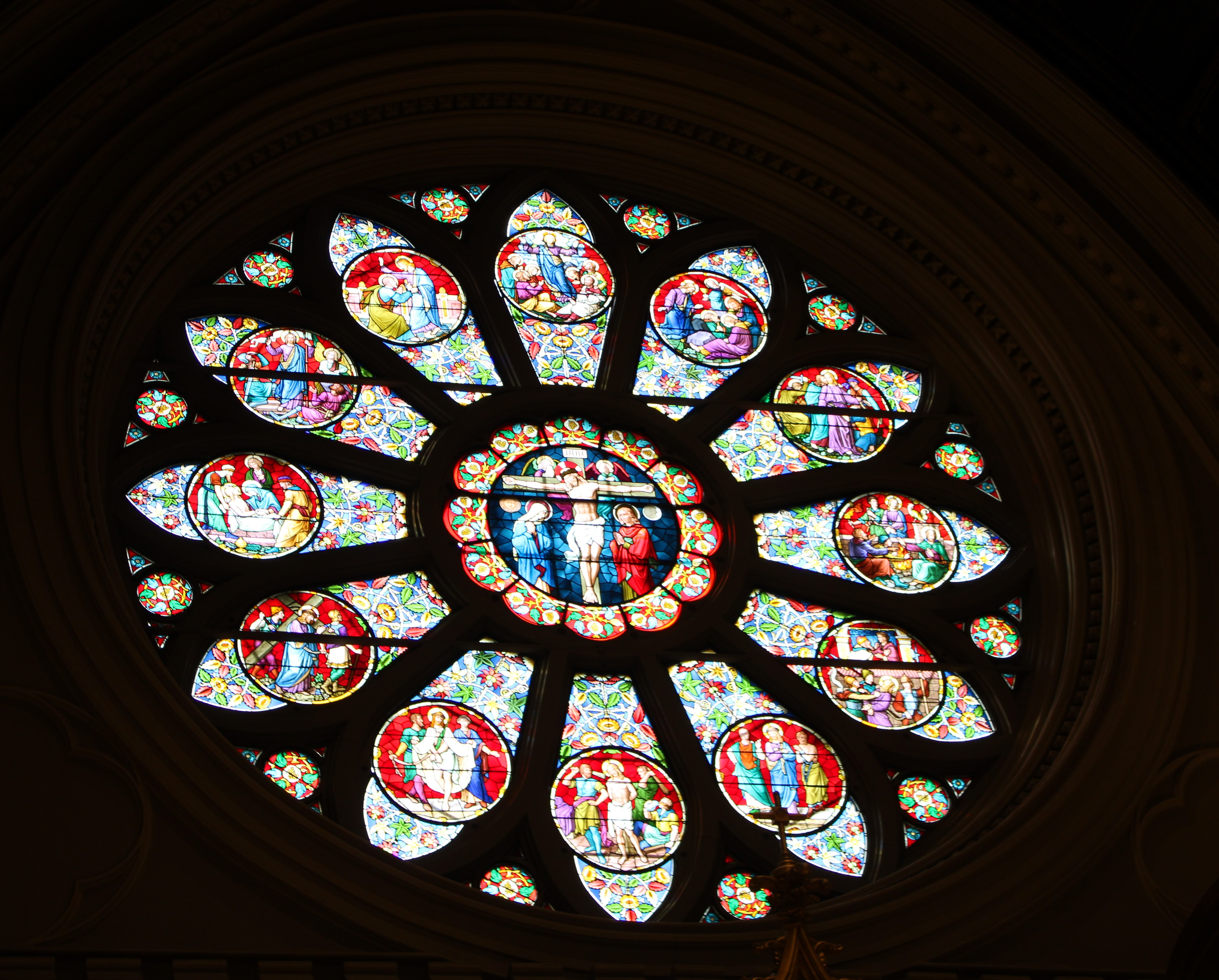
Rose window over altar (2024)

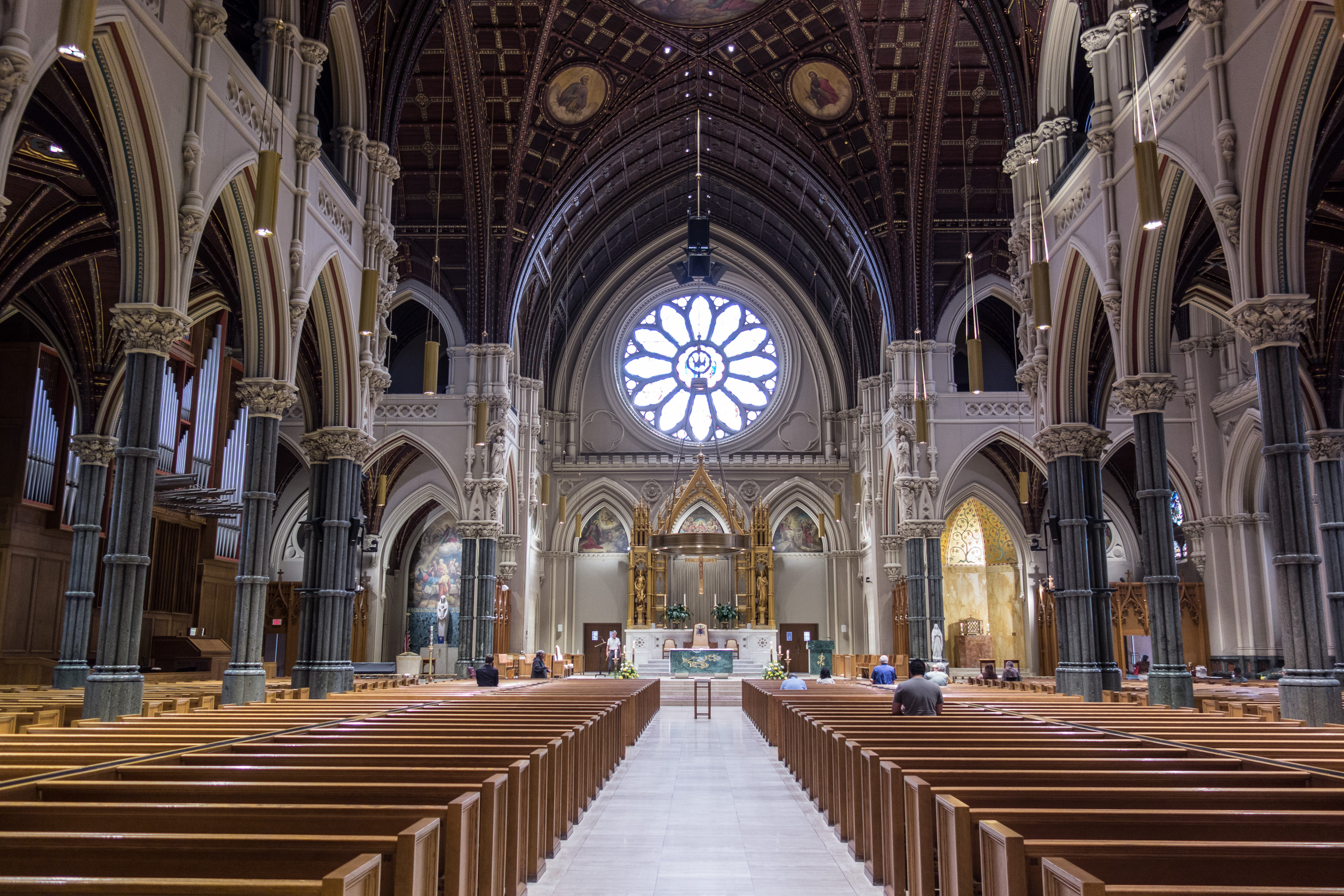
Cathedral interior (2016)

=== Sanctuary ===
The tabernacle was cast in bronze by X. Corberro and Sons of Barcelona, Spain. The small finial ornament atop the tabernacle took 58 hours to complete. The main altar is built of Verde Issoire, a green marble quarried in the French Alps. The circular window over the altar depicts 13 scenes of the passion and death of Christ.

=== Nave ===
The floors in the nave are composed of Travertine marble. Green marble serves as decorative wainscoting along the walls and comprises the interior columns along the nave. The nave and transepts are capped by a ceiling of Gothic vaulting and ribs of carved wood with the areas between the ribs painted in various scenes. A large granite sarcophagus rests in the west transept, containing the remains of Bishop Hendricken.The pews are constructed of quartered Appalachian oakwood.

=== Stained glass windows ===
The stained glass windows feature scenes from both the New and Old Testaments and are fashioned from antique Munich Glass as are the west rose window, east rose window and great circular window. The windows were created in the studios of the Tyrolese Art Glass Company of Innsbruck, Austria.

== Cathedral exterior ==
The cathedral is 156 feet (48 m) wide; it is constructed of Connecticut Brownstone. The two towers are each 156 ft (48 m) high. They contain four church bells representative of the Four Evangelists: Matthew, Mark, Luke and John. They were cast in a foundry in the Netherlands and were dedicated in 1968 by Bishop McVinney.

== Cathedral Square ==
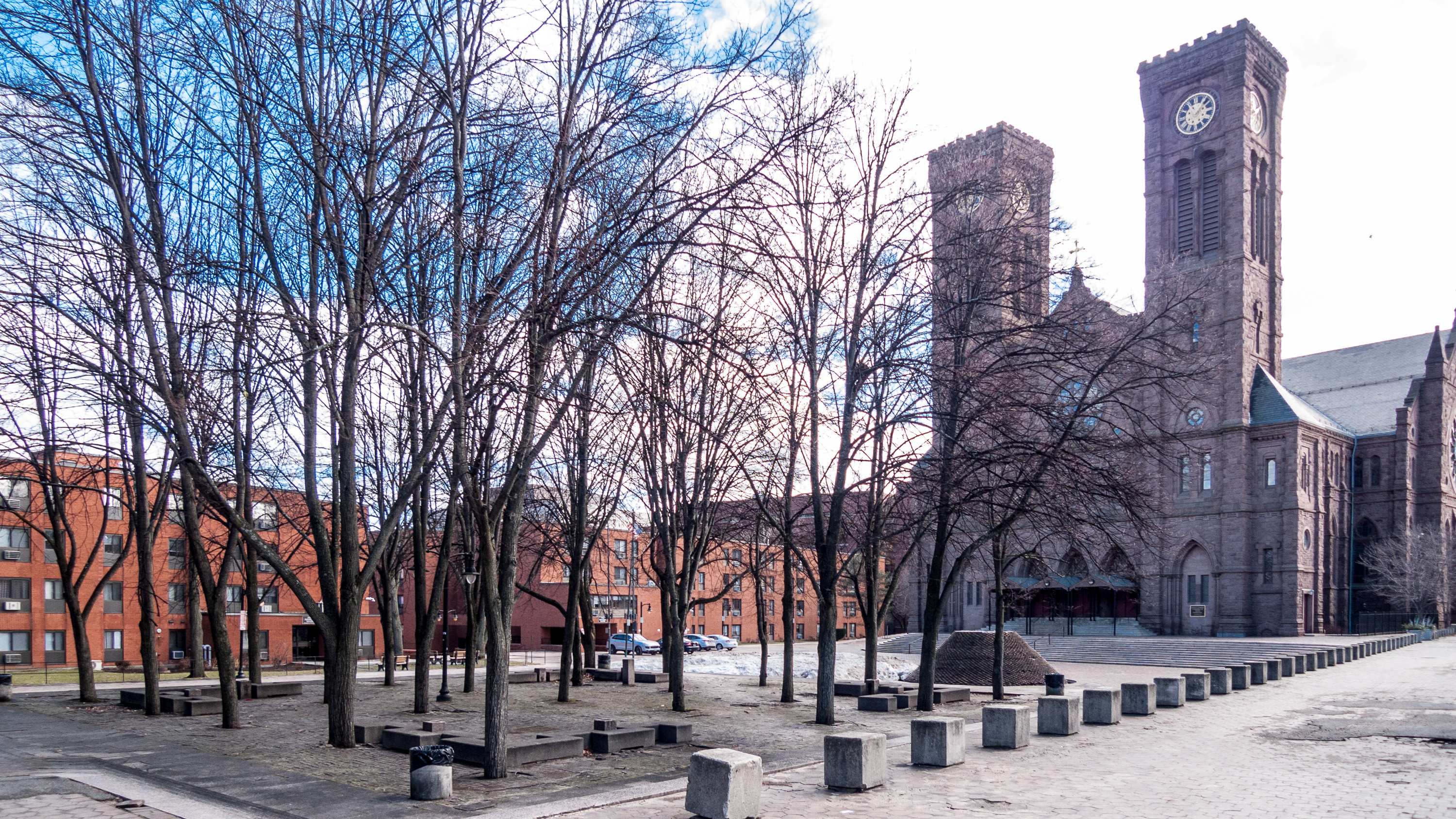
Cathedral Square (2018)

Cathedral Square is a public space in front of the cathedral. Between 1878 and World War II, the square was a bustling civic center of downtown Providence. Shops and businesses lined the area, and church crowds numbered in the hundreds. After the war, this center of civic life dwindled as people moved to the suburbs.A statue of Providence mayor Thomas A. Doyle was erected in Cathedral Square in 1889

In the late 1960s, the City of Providence hired architect I. M. Pei to redesign Cathedral Square. The Doyle statue was removed from the square.Pei's new plaza, modeled after the Greek Agora marketplaces, opened in 1972. Unfortunately, the city ran out of money before Pei's vision could be completed. Also, recent construction of a low-income housing complex and Interstate 95 had changed the neighborhood's character permanently., and removed to the corner of Broad and Chestnut Street in 1967. In 1974, The Providence Evening Bulletin called the new plaza a 'conspicuous failure.' By 2016, media reports characterized the plaza as a neglected, little-visited "hidden gem".

== Pipe Organ ==
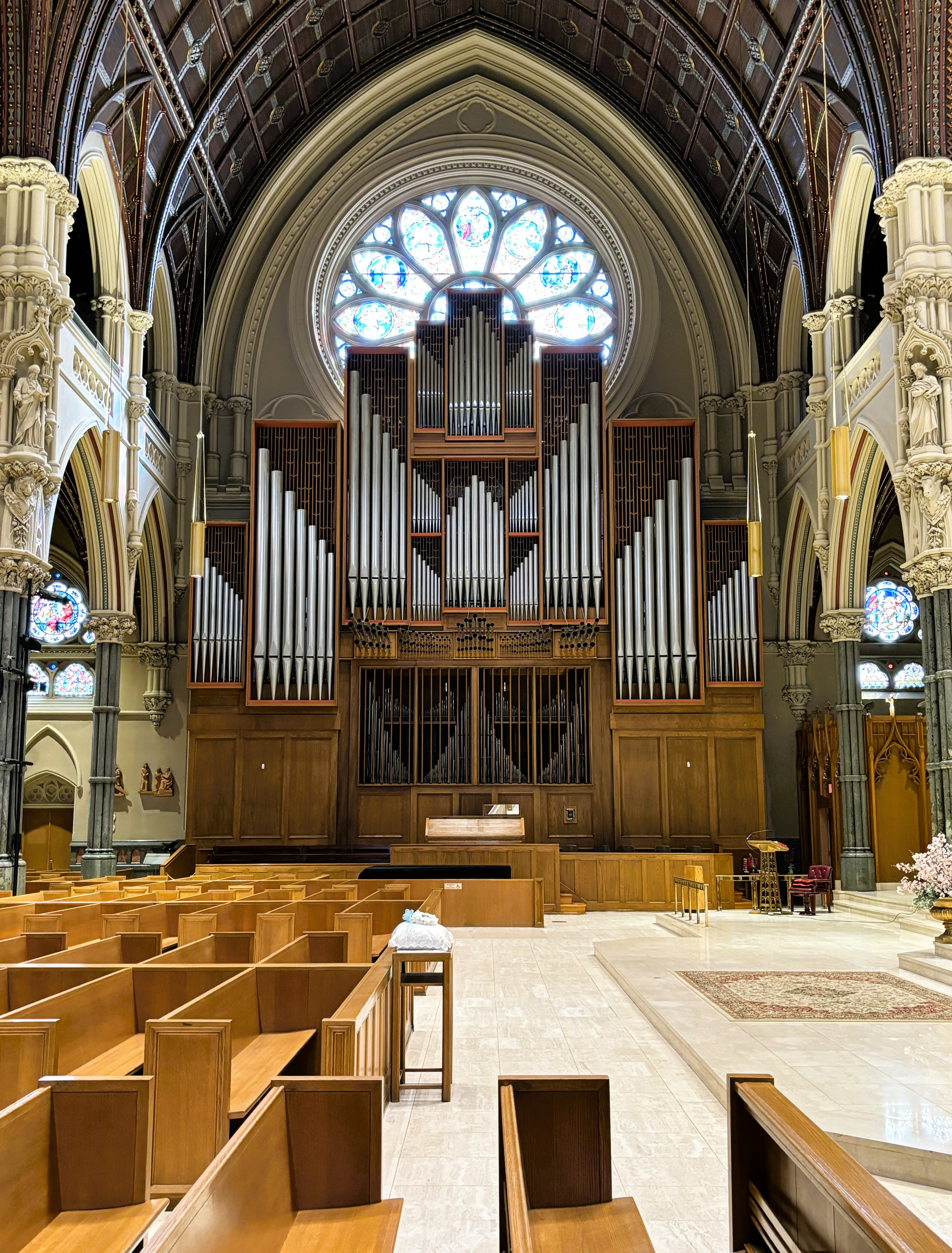
Pipe organ (2024)

The cathedral pipe organ is a Casavant's Opus 3145 built by the Casavant Frères company of Saint-Hyacinthe, Quebec. It was designed by the American organ builder Lawrence Phelps. The pipe organ was installed in the North Transept in 1971at a cost of $217,500.

The pipe organ has four 56-key manuals, a 32-key pedalboard, 74 stops and 126 ranks. It has 6,616 pipes ranging in size from 6 inches (15 cm) to 32 feet (9.8 m) in length. It is one of the largest mechanical action organs in North America and one of the largest ever built by Casavant Frères.

I Positif C–g^{3}
Quintaton	16'
Montre	8'
Bourdon	8'
Prestant	4'
Flûte	4'
Nasard	2^{2}/_{3}'
Doublette	2'
Quarte de nasard	2'
Tierce	1^{3}/_{5}'
Larigot	1^{1}/_{3}'
Fourniture IV	1'
Cymbale IV	^{1}/_{2}'
Douçaine	16'
Cromorne	8'
Petite Trompette	4'
Tremblant

II Grand Orgue C–g^{3}
Montre	16'
Bourdon	16'
Montre	8'
Flûte à cheminée	8'
Flûte harmonique	8'
Gros Nasard	5^{1}/_{3}'
Prestant	4'
Flûte ouverte	4'
Grosse Tierce	3^{1}/_{5}'
Nasard	2^{2}/_{3}'
Doublette	2'
Quarte de nasard	2'
Tierce	1^{3}/_{5}'
Cornet V
Grosse Fourniture IV	2^{2}/_{3}'
Fourniture IV	1^{1}/_{3}'
Cymbale IV	^{2}/_{3}'
Bombarde	16'
Trompette	8'
Clairon	4'

III Récit expressif C–g^{3}
Bourdon	16'
Flûte bouchée	8'
Salicional	8'
Viole de gambe	8'
Voix céleste	8'
Principal étroit	4'
Flûte traversière	4'
Flûte conique	2'
Cornet V
Plein Jeu V	2^{2}/_{3}'
Petite Fourniture III	1'
Basson	16'
Trompette	8'
Hautbois	8'
Voix humaine	8'
Clairon	4'
Tremulant

IV Bombarde C–g^{3}
Cornet V
Plein Jeu VIII	2^{2}/_{3}'
Harmoniques VIII	2'
Bombarde	16'
Trompette	8'
Clairon	4'

Pédale C–g^{1}
Soubasse	32'
Montre	16'
Soubasse	16'
Prestant	8'
Bourdon	8'
Flûte	8'
Quinte	5^{1}/_{3}'
Octave	4'
Flûte	4'
Flûte	2'
Fourniture VI	2'
Bombardon	32'
Bombarde	16'
Basson	16'
Trompette	8'
Clairon	4'
Chalumeau	2'

== Gallery ==
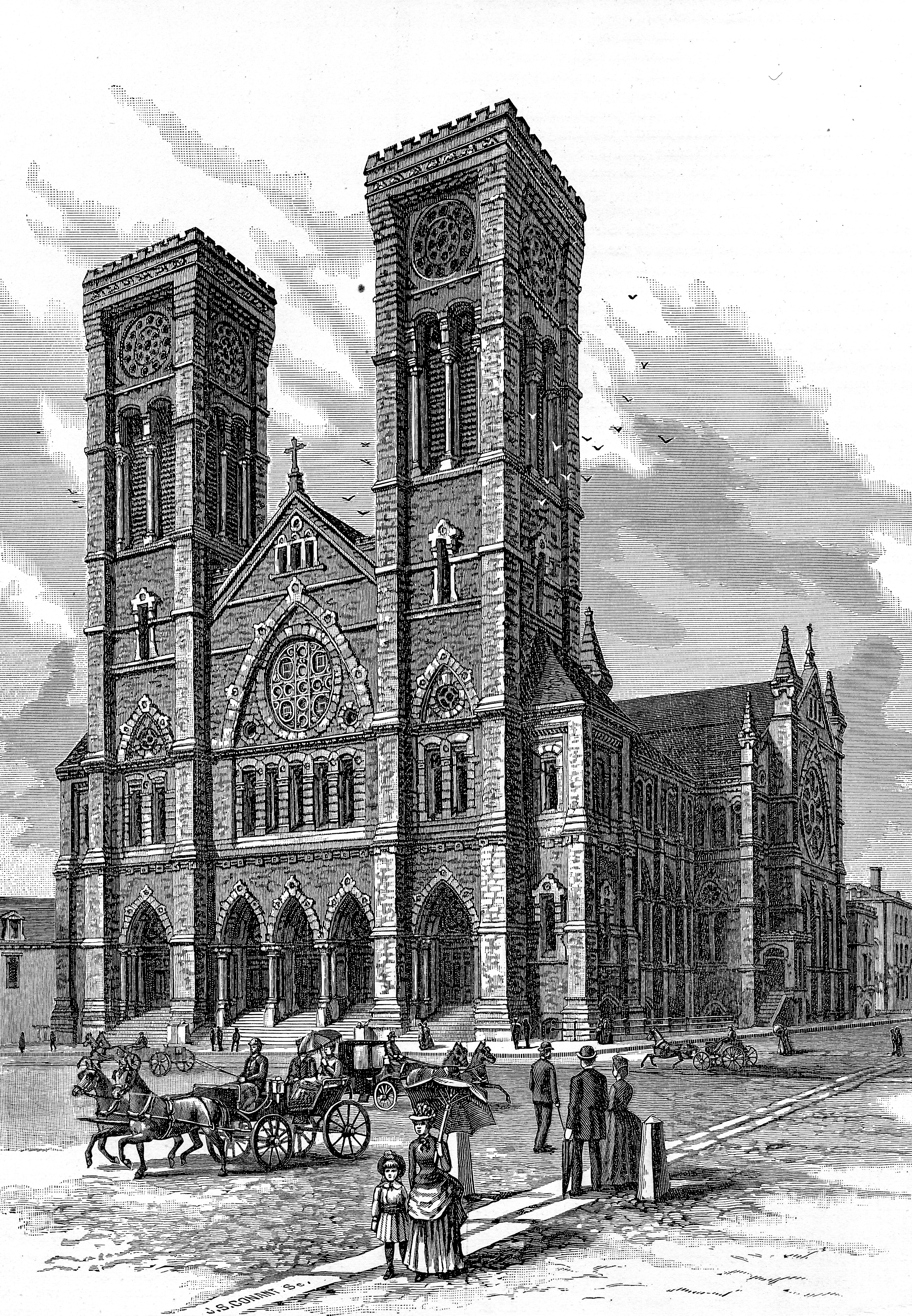
Cathedral exterior (1886)

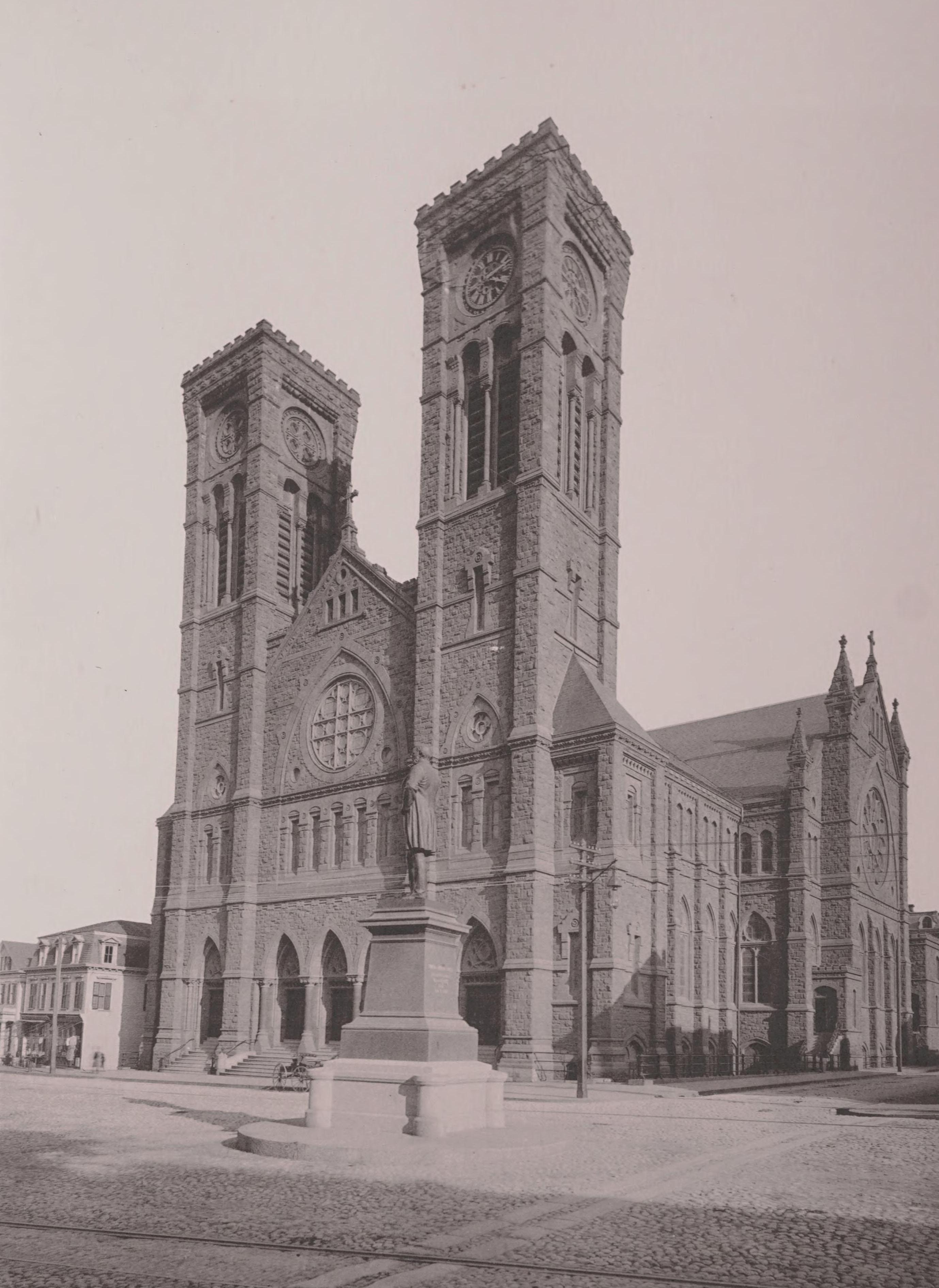
Cathedral exterior (1891)

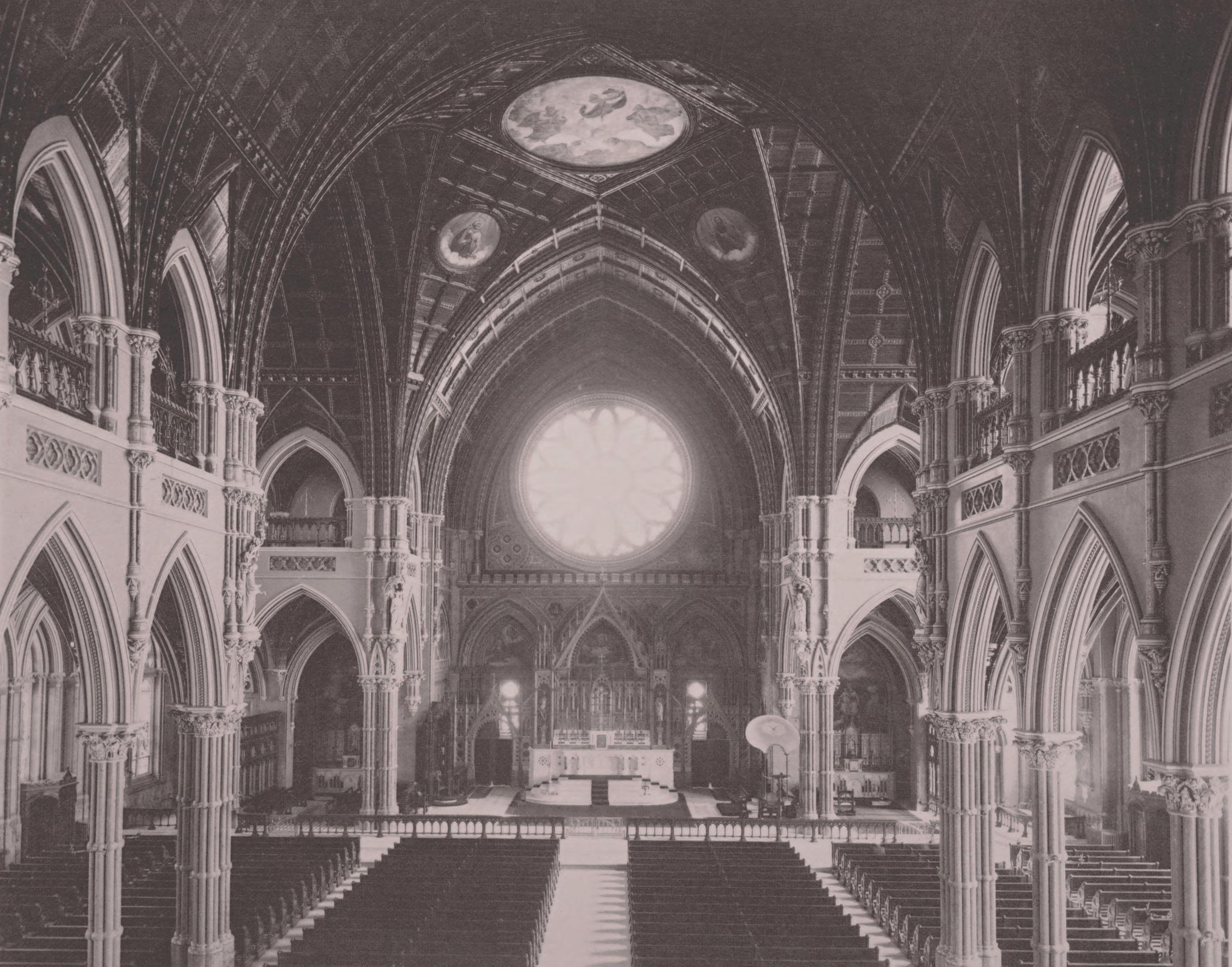
Cathedral interior (1891)

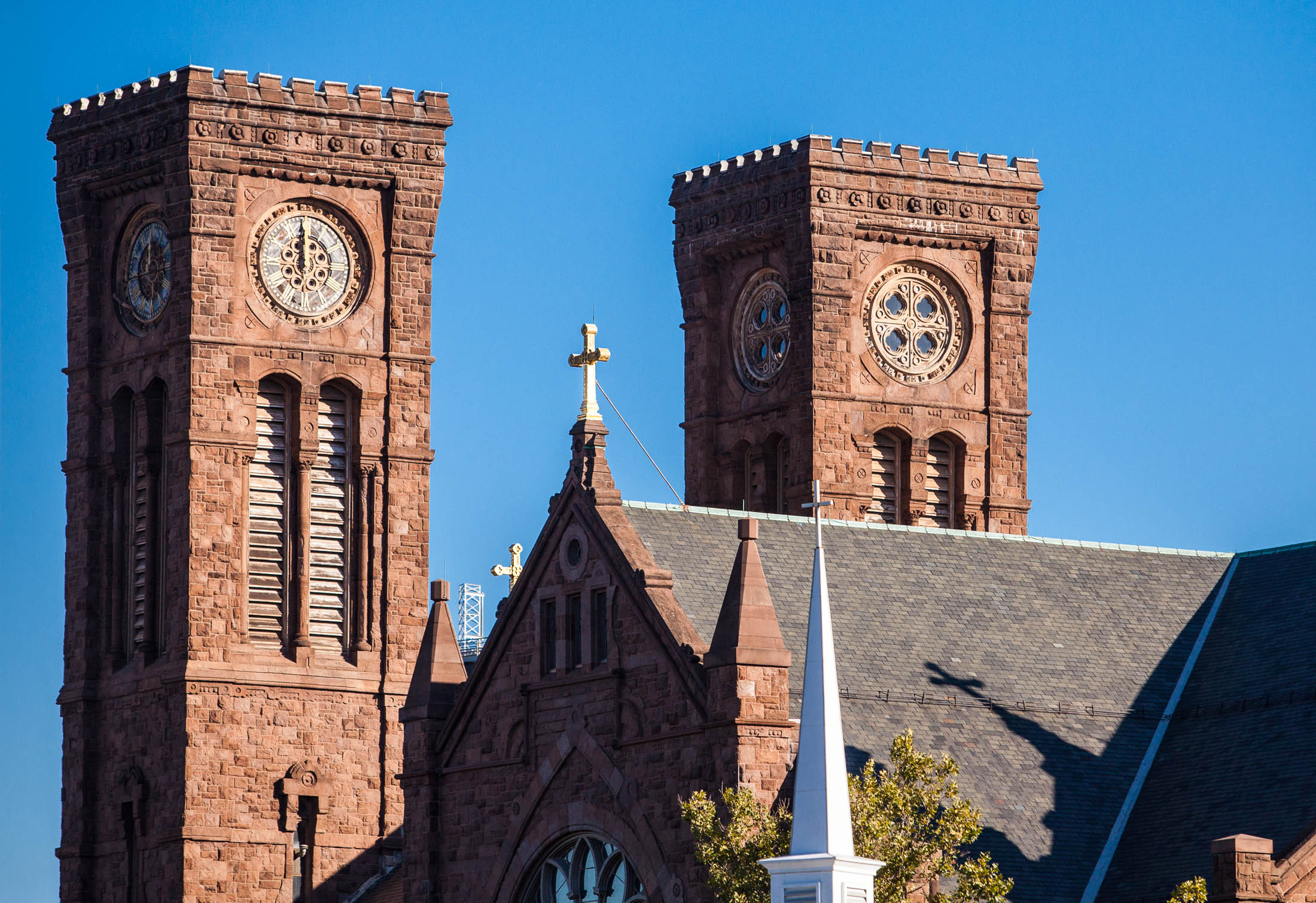
Cathedral towers (2012)

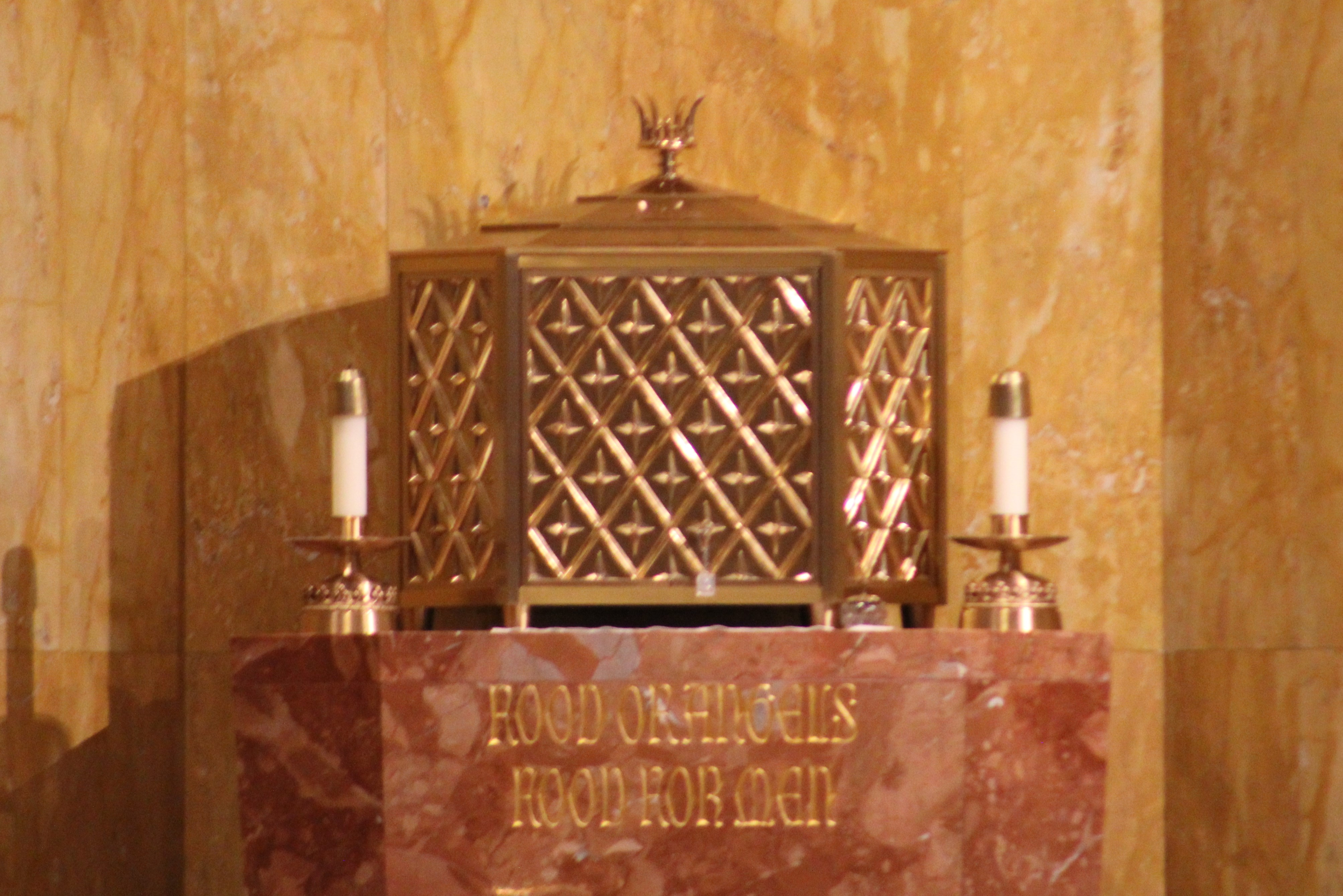
Tabernacle (2024)

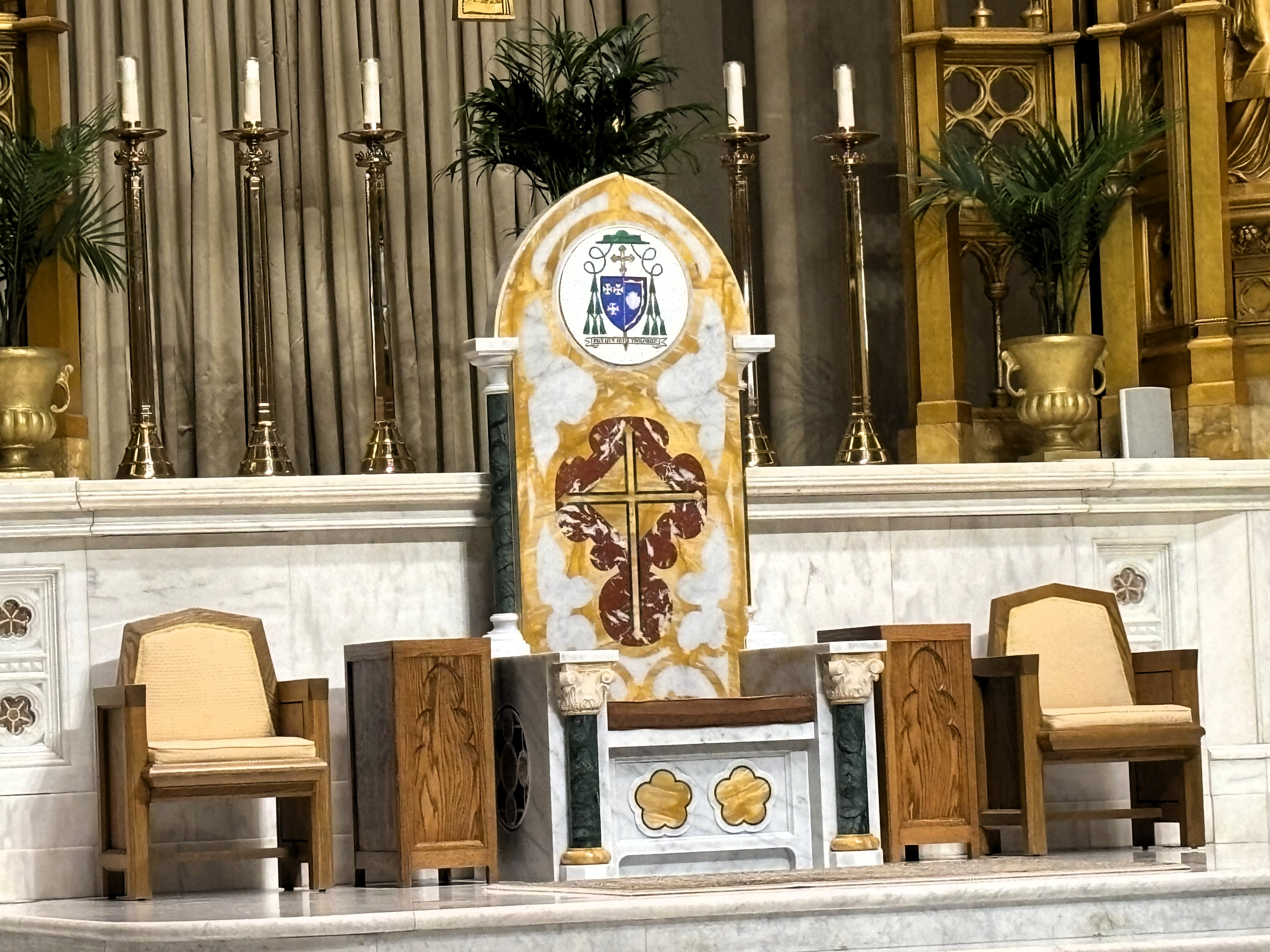
Cathedra (2024)

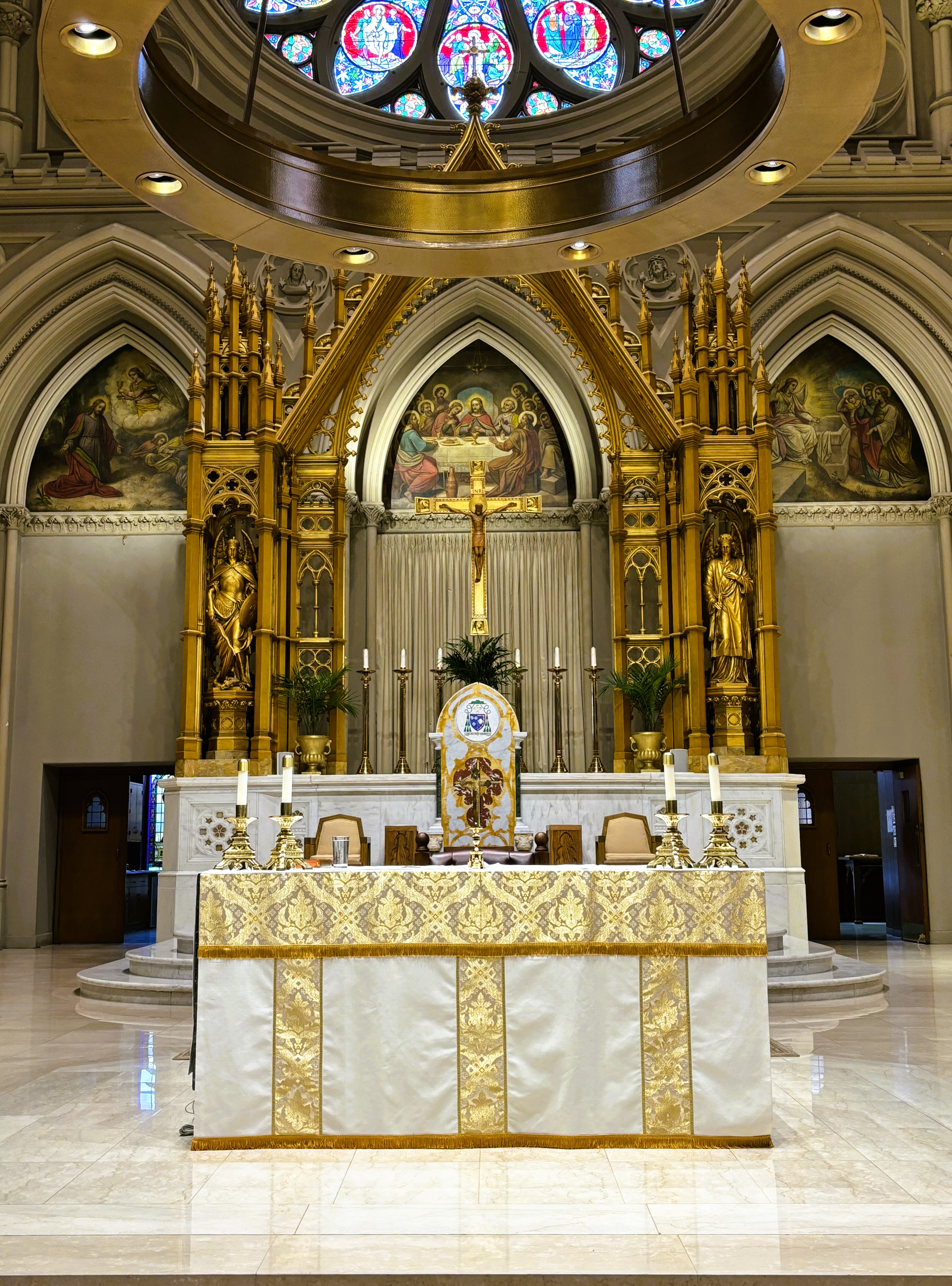
Altar (2024

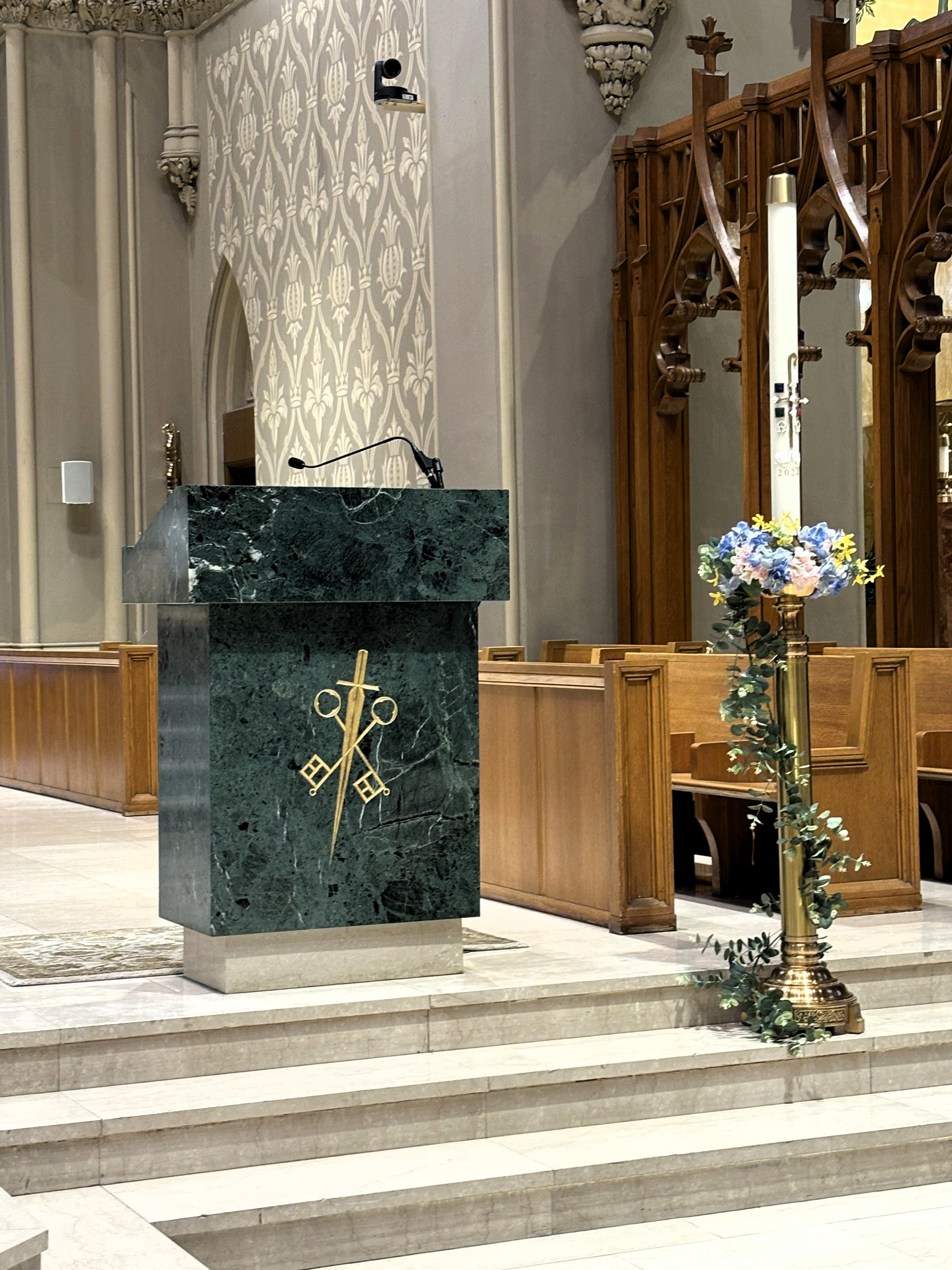
Ambo and Paschal candle (2024)

== See also ==
- List of Catholic cathedrals in the United States
- List of cathedrals in the United States
- National Register of Historic Places listings in Providence, Rhode Island
