= Warwick Neck, Rhode Island =

Coordinates: 41.6851°N 71.3794°W

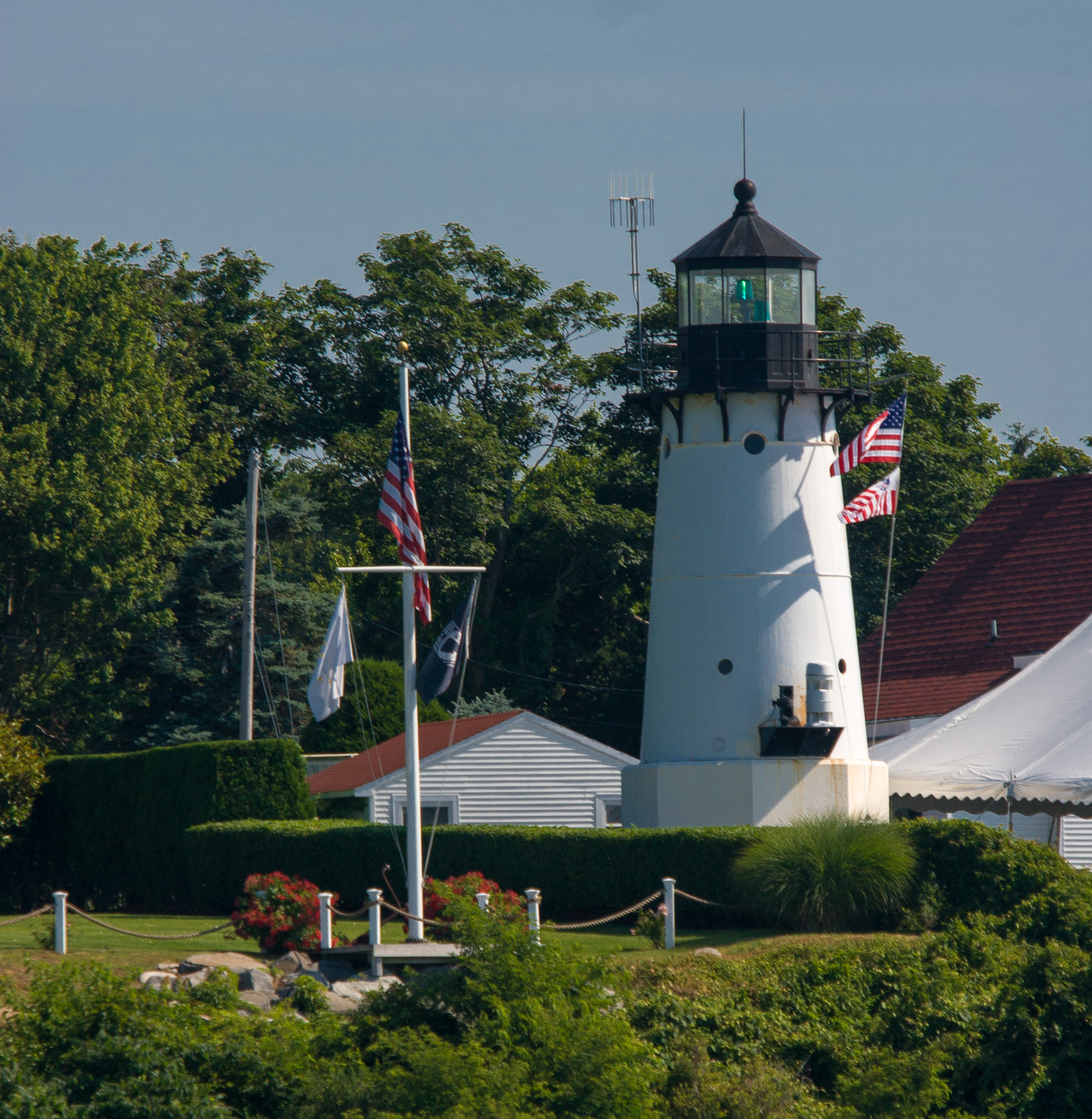
Warwick Neck Lighthouse

Warwick Neck is a part of the City of Warwick, Rhode Island, United States. This section of Warwick Neck was first settled in 1660s — (built approximately 1896 on 75 acres), home of former U.S. Senator Nelson W. Aldrich (whose daughter Abby wed John D. Rockefeller, Jr.) and his mansion and Warwick Neck Lighthouse. Also former location of Rocky Point Amusement Park, closed in 1996.
