= Maria Goretti (disambiguation) =

Maria Goretti (1890–1902) is an Italian virgin-martyr of the Catholic Church.

Maria Goretti may also refer to:

- Maria Goretti (film), a 2003 Italian television movie based on the life of the saint
- Maria Goretti (actress), Indian MTV VJ and actress
- Maria Goretti, a 1953 radiophonic opera by Marcel Delannoy
- Santa Maria Goretti, Rio Grande do Sul, a neighbourhood in Porto Alegre, Rio Grande do Sul, Brazil
- Santa Maria Goretti, Rome, a church in Rome

== See also ==
- Colegio Santa María Goretti, Rancagua, Cachapoal Province, Chile
- St. Maria Goretti High School, Hagerstown, Maryland, U.S.
- Saints John Neumann and Maria Goretti Catholic High School, Philadelphia, Pennsylvania, U.S.
  - Saint Maria Goretti High School (Pennsylvania), a former all-female school later merged into the above school
- Stadio Santa Maria Goretti, a multi-use stadium in Catania, Italy
