= Serenelli =

Serenelli is a surname. It may refer to:

- Alessandro Serenelli (1882-1970), Italian, who in 1902 attempted to seduce a young girl named Maria Goretti stabbing her fatally. Goretti was later proclaimed a saint by the Roman Catholic Church.
- Giancarlo Serenelli (born 1981), Venezuelan racing driver

== See also ==
- Serenella
