= Cathedral of St. Joseph (Hartford, Connecticut) =

Historic church in Connecticut, United States

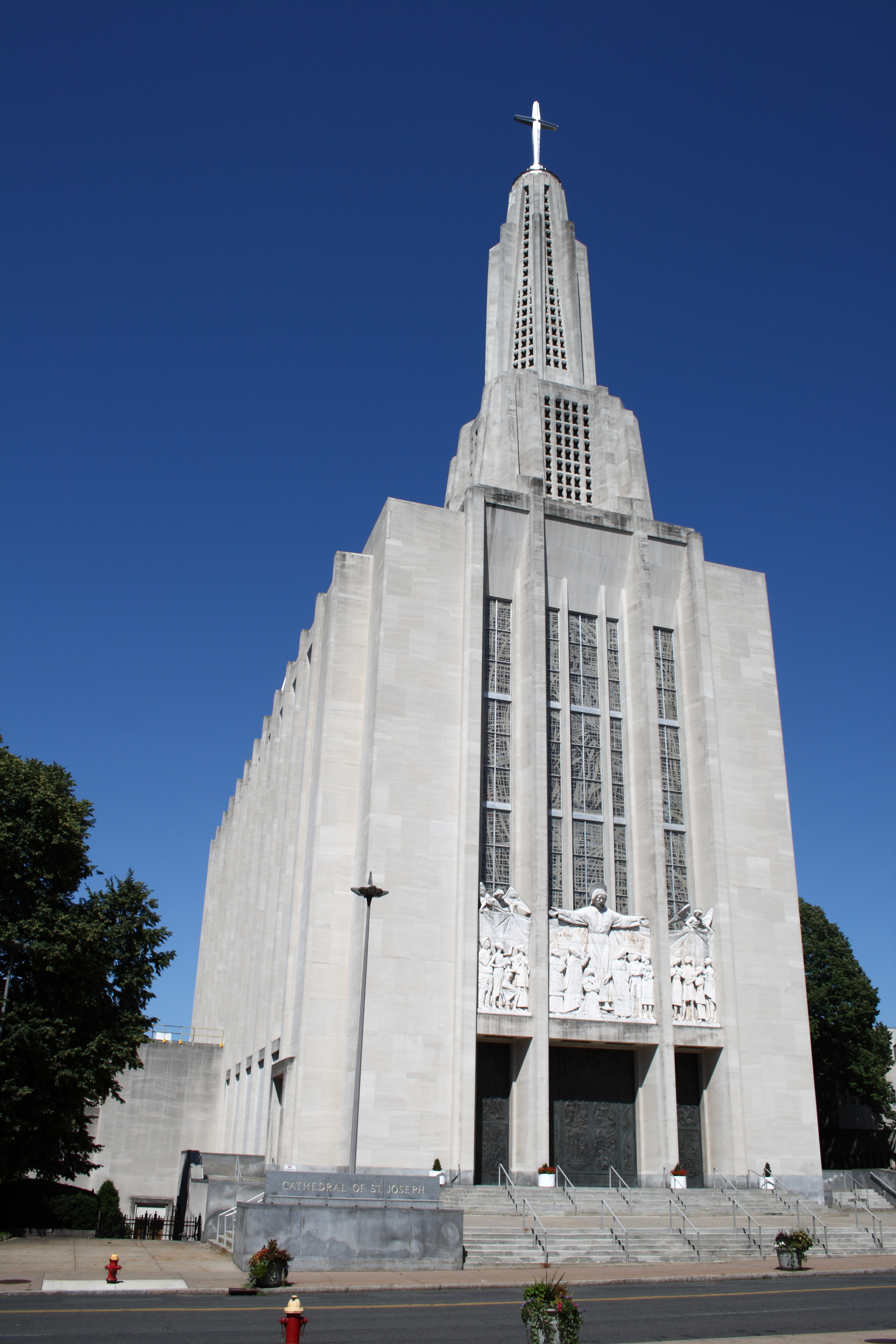

- Location in Connecticut Cathedral of St. Joseph (the United States)
- 41°46′06″N 72°41′32″W
- Location: 140 Farmington Avenue; Hartford, Connecticut
- Country: United States
- Denomination: Roman Catholic Church
- Website: www.hartfordcathedral.org

History
- Founded: 1872
- Consecrated: May 15, 1962

Architecture
- Heritage designation
- Cathedral of St. Joseph
- U.S. Historic district – Contributing property
- Part of: Asylum Avenue District (ID79002672)
- Added to NRHP: November 29, 1979
- Architect: Eggers & Higgins
- Completed: 1962

Specifications
- Capacity: 1,750
- Length: 284 feet (87 m)
- Width: 156 feet (48 m)
- Height: 108 feet (33 m)
- Materials: Concrete & Limestone

Administration
- Archdiocese: Hartford

Clergy
- Archbishop: Most Rev. Christopher J. Coyne
- Rector: Very Rev. John P. Melnick
- Vicar: Rev. Daniel Valente

The Cathedral of St. Joseph in Hartford, Connecticut, United States, is the mother church and seat of the Archdiocese of Hartford. Dedicated on May 15, 1962, it stands on the site of the first cathedral which was destroyed by fire in 1956. It is located on Farmington Avenue just outside downtown Hartford. The capacity of the cathedral is about 1,750 people, not including the two side chapels.

In 1979, the Cathedral of St. Joseph was included as a contributing property in the Asylum Avenue District, listed on the National Register of Historic Places.

== History ==
=== First cathedral ===
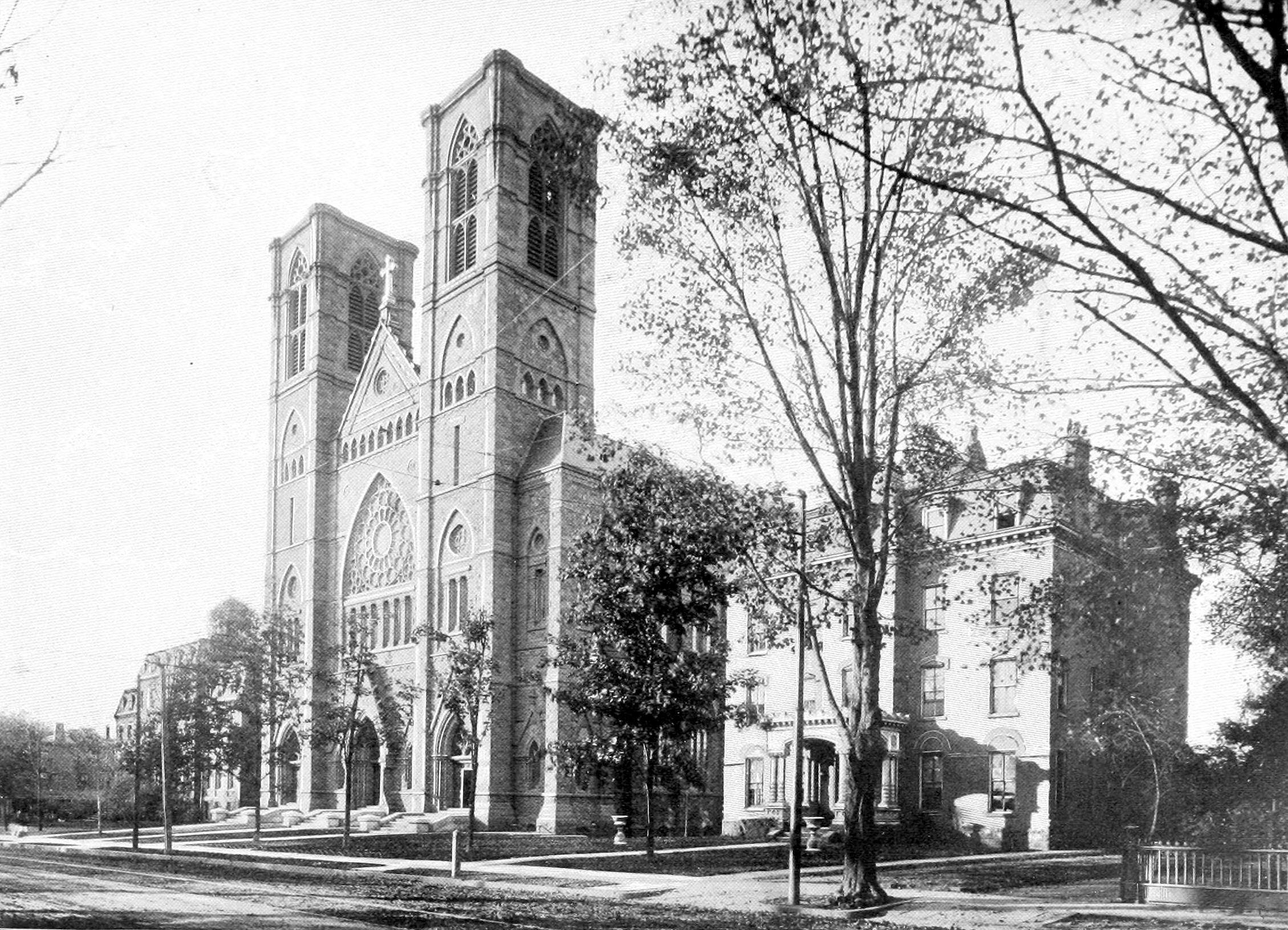
First Cathedral of St. Joseph (1900). Destroyed by fire in 1956

Pope Gregory XVI in 1843 erected the Diocese of Hartford, encompassing the states of Connecticut and Rhode Island. Because Providence, Rhode Island had a larger Catholic population, Bishop William Tyler chose to reside there instead of Hartford. His two successors did likewise. Bishop Francis McFarland in 1872 petitioned the Vatican to create a separated diocese for Rhode Island.

After the Diocese of Providence was erected in 1872, McFarland moved his episcopal see to Hartford. He purchased the old Morgan estate in the city for $75,000, intending to first build a convent for the Sisters of Mercy as well as his own residence. The estate would also serve as the site for cathedral, as none of the existing churches in Hartford were adequate for that need. After the convent was built, McFarland designated its chapel as the pro-cathedral (temporary cathedral) for the diocese.

McFarland hired the architect Patrick Keely, a designer of many churches in the United States, to lay out the new cathedral. Bishop Thomas Galberry, McFarland's successor, laid the cornerstone for the cathedral on April 29, 1877. The basement was dedicated for church use the following year. After Bishop Lawrence McMahon liquidated the diocese's debt, he was able to complete the first Cathedral of St. Joseph, which he consecrated on May 8, 1892.

The first cathedral was a Gothic Revival structure that was cruciform in shape. Its exterior was clad in Portland rough brownstone. Two towers rising 150 feet (46 m) flanked the main facade. The interior featured an inlaid ceiling with imported wood, a rotunda lined with gold leaf and 72 stained glass windows. The cathedra was carved from oak and the high altar constructed of marble. The cathedral was decorated with paintings and statues. During the 1930s, the cathedral started settling on its foundation. The archdiocese was forced to stabilize the building in 1938.

During morning mass on December 31, 1956, some worshippers reported smelling smoke in the cathedral. The Hartford Fire Department could not find the source of the fire until late morning, when flames appeared in the ceiling. The roof quickly collapsed and the building was consumed by fire. Its cause was never determined. Structural engineers determined that the building was unsalvageable and the archdiocese cleared the site for the construction of a new cathedral.

=== Present day cathedral ===
The archdiocese in 1957 chose the architectural firm of Eggers & Higgins from New York City to design the present cathedral. On September 8, 1958, Archbishop Henry O'Brien presided over its groundbreaking. During the construction, the archdiocese held Sunday masses at the auditorium of the Aetna Life Insurance Company building in Hartford and daily masses in the St. Joseph Cathedral School auditorium.

Auxiliary Bishop John Hackett blessed the lower level of the cathedral on December 24, 1960, and O'Brien celebrated the first mass there later that night. Hackett laid the cornerstone, salvaged from the first cathedral, for the new cathedral on October 3, 1961. O'Brien consecrated the carillion bells in 1961 and blessed the tower cross in 1962. Hackett consecrated the completed cathedral on May 15, 1962. It was built for about $10 million.

In 2016, the archdiocese added a new entrance to the cathedral, along with an elevator and new restrooms. Two years later, contractors cleaned and repaired the exterior limestone as it was starting to deteriorate.

The next improvements to the cathedral campus were to include repairing the front plaza; creating a Cathedral Square that included a pedestrian mall, park, and public gardens; and renovating the lower level of the cathedral into educational and community meeting facilities, a dining area, and a mausoleum.

On October 31, 2020, the cathedral hosted the beatification mass for Reverend Michael J. McGivney, who founded the Knights of Columbus in 1882.

== Architecture ==
=== Exterior ===
Eggers & Higgins designed the new Cathedral of St. Joseph with an International style interpretation of the Gothic style, maintaining the verticality of the first cathedral. The present cathedral is 284 feet (87 m) high.

The cathedral is built of reinforced concrete and covered with smooth, light-gray, coursed limestone. The stone blocks used in the tall spire are cut in a pattern of voids that causes a constant play of light and shadow." A large frieze over the main entrance features the archdiocesan patron, Saint Joseph. The tall bronze doors weigh five and a half tons and are decorated with biblical scenes.

The bell chamber contains 12 bells that were cast by the Petit & Fritsen foundry in Aarle-Rixtel, Netherlands. They range in weight from 225 pounds (102 kg) up to 3,850 pounds (1,750 kg).

=== Interior ===
The interior of the cathedral has a large array of stained glass windows from France; they are similar to those found in the Sainte-Chapelle Church in Paris. Each glass panel is approximately 70 by 14 feet (21.3 by 4.3 m) and 1 inch (2.5 cm) thick. The ceramic tile mural behind the altar, Christ in Glory, is said to be the largest in the world.

A wall of etched glass separates the narthex from the main nave. Created by the Hungarian artist János Hajnal, it depicts the Kingdom of Christ in Earth and heaven.

=== Chapels ===
The cathedral has two main chapels. One main chapel contains a tabernacle and altar and has a mural of Jesus and his disciples. The second main chapel has a mural depicting the Holy Family and contains the baptismal font. The cathedral also contains small chapels made of mosaic with kneelers for worshipers.

== Pipe organs ==
The Cathedral of St. Joseph has two pipe organs, both designed by the Austin Organ Company of Hartford.

- The rear gallery pipe organ is the largest one in Connecticut. It has four manuals, six divisions, 81 stops, 95 registers, 114 ranks, and 6,878 pipes.
- The Blessed Sacrament Chapel pipe organ features three manuals, three divisions, 17 stops, 22 registers, 19 ranks, and 1,195 pipes.

== Images ==
Exterior, second cathedral
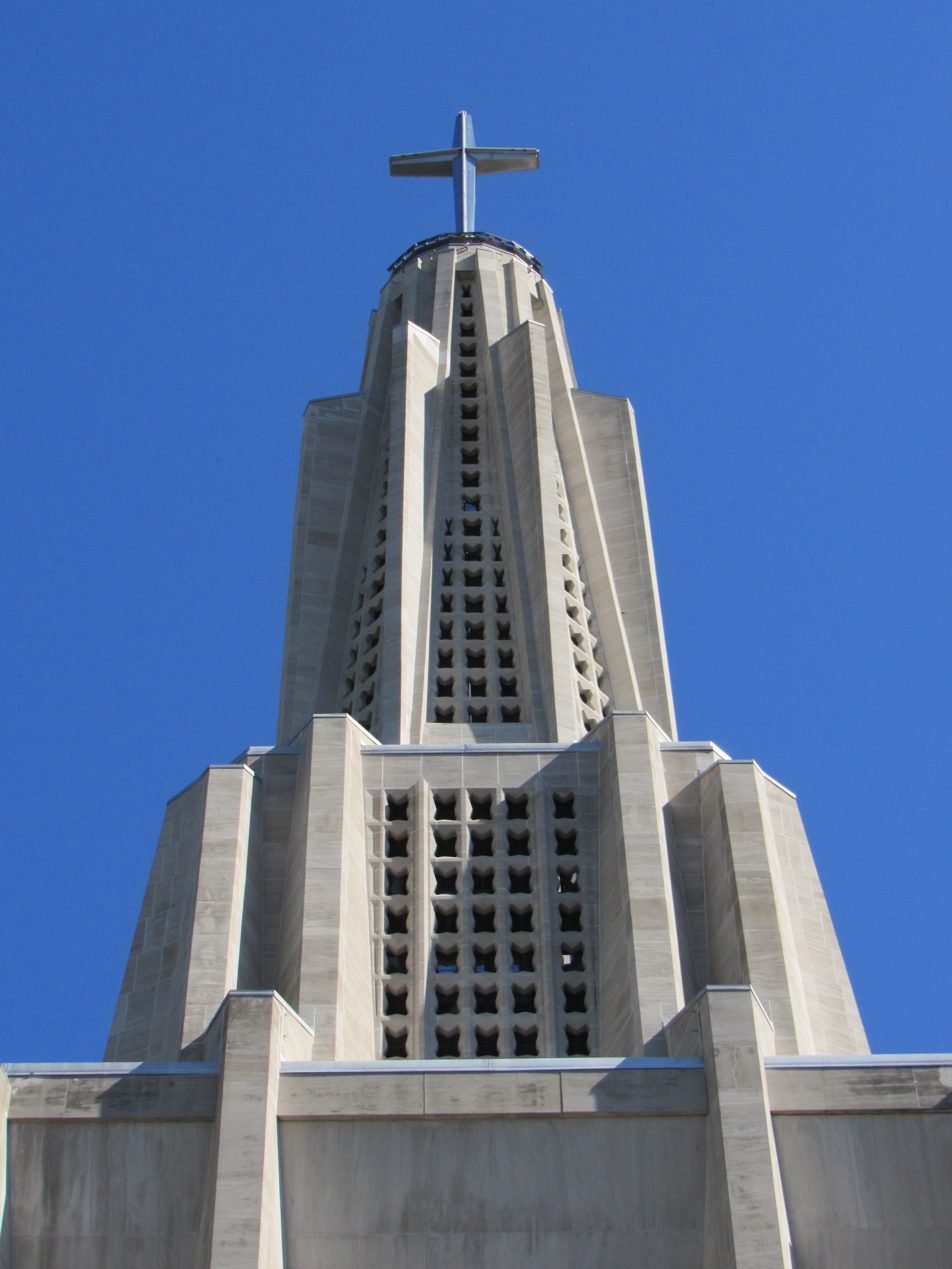
Bell tower and cross

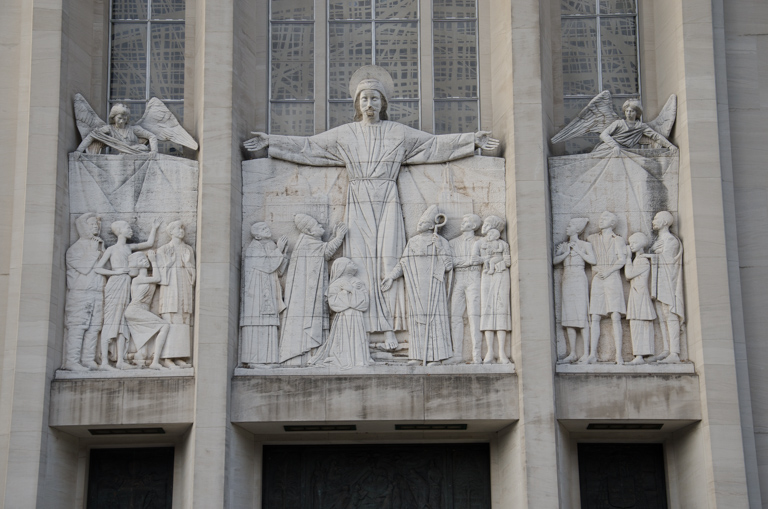
Bas relief above entrance

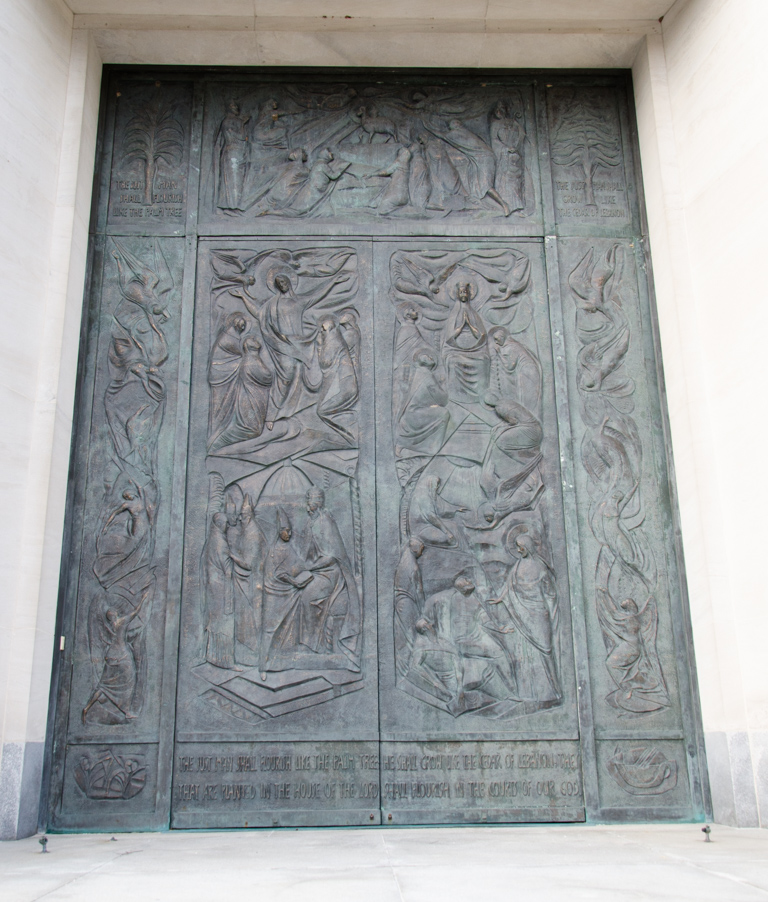
Main portal

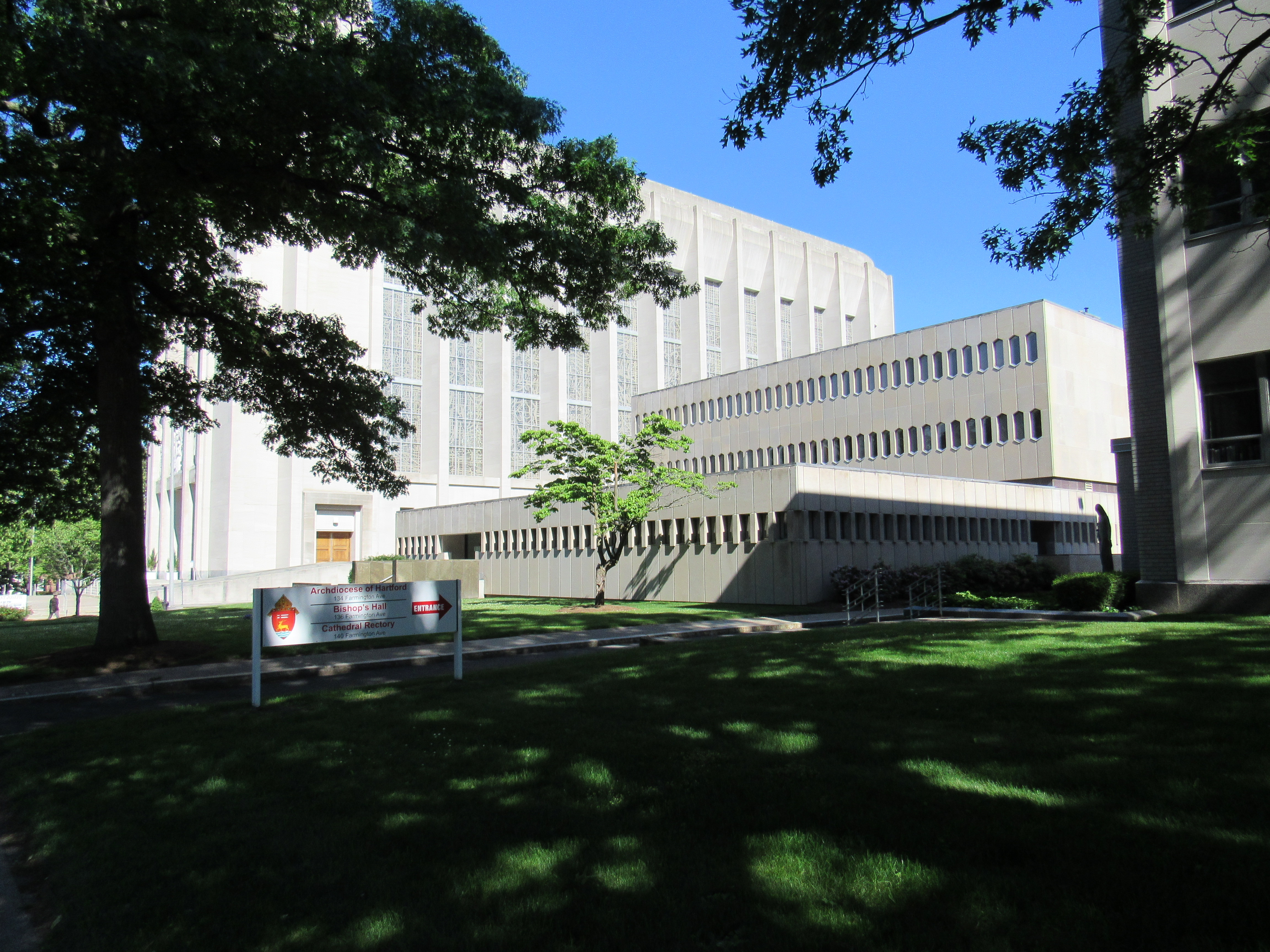
Rectory
Interior, second cathedral
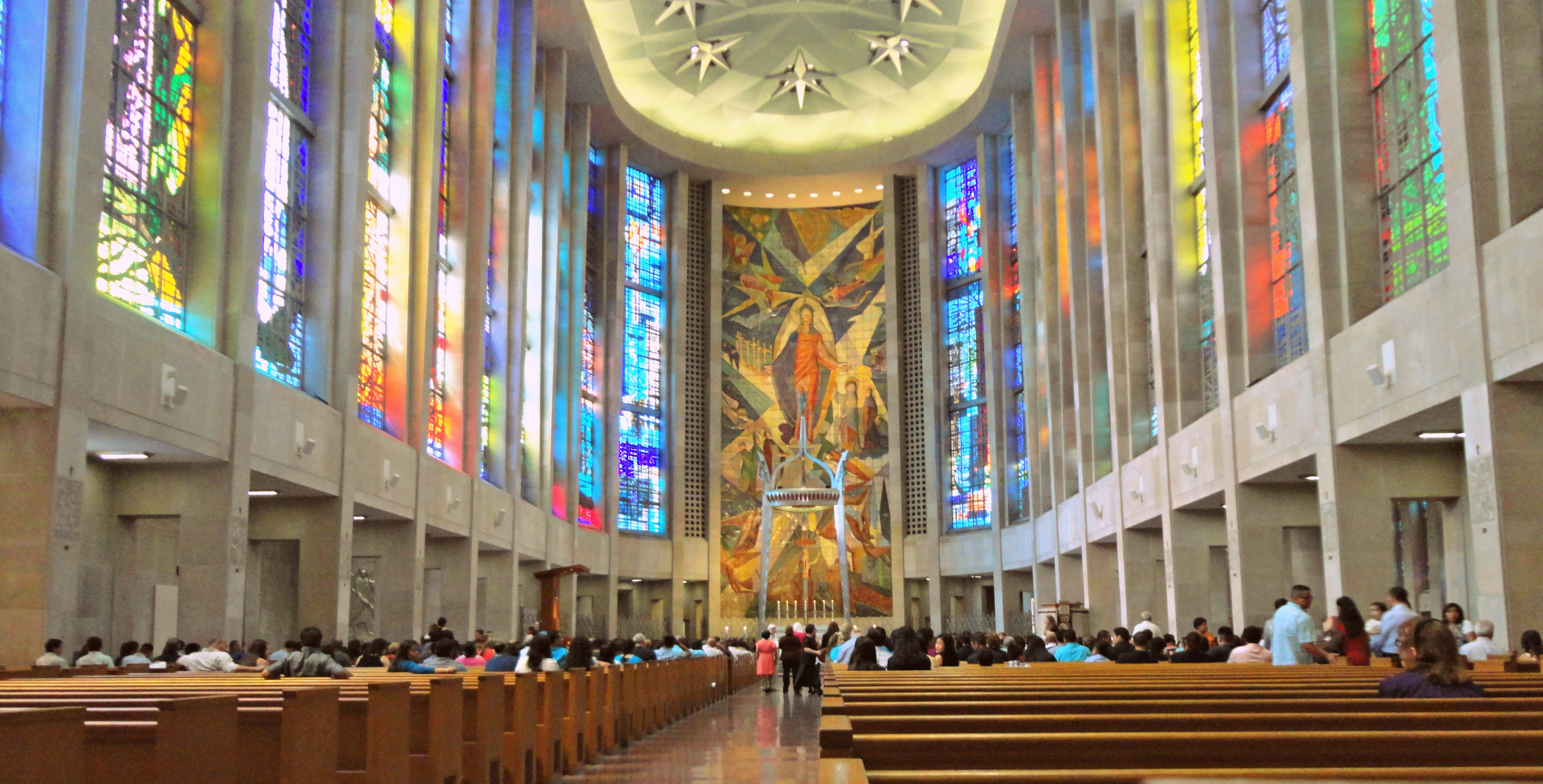
Nave

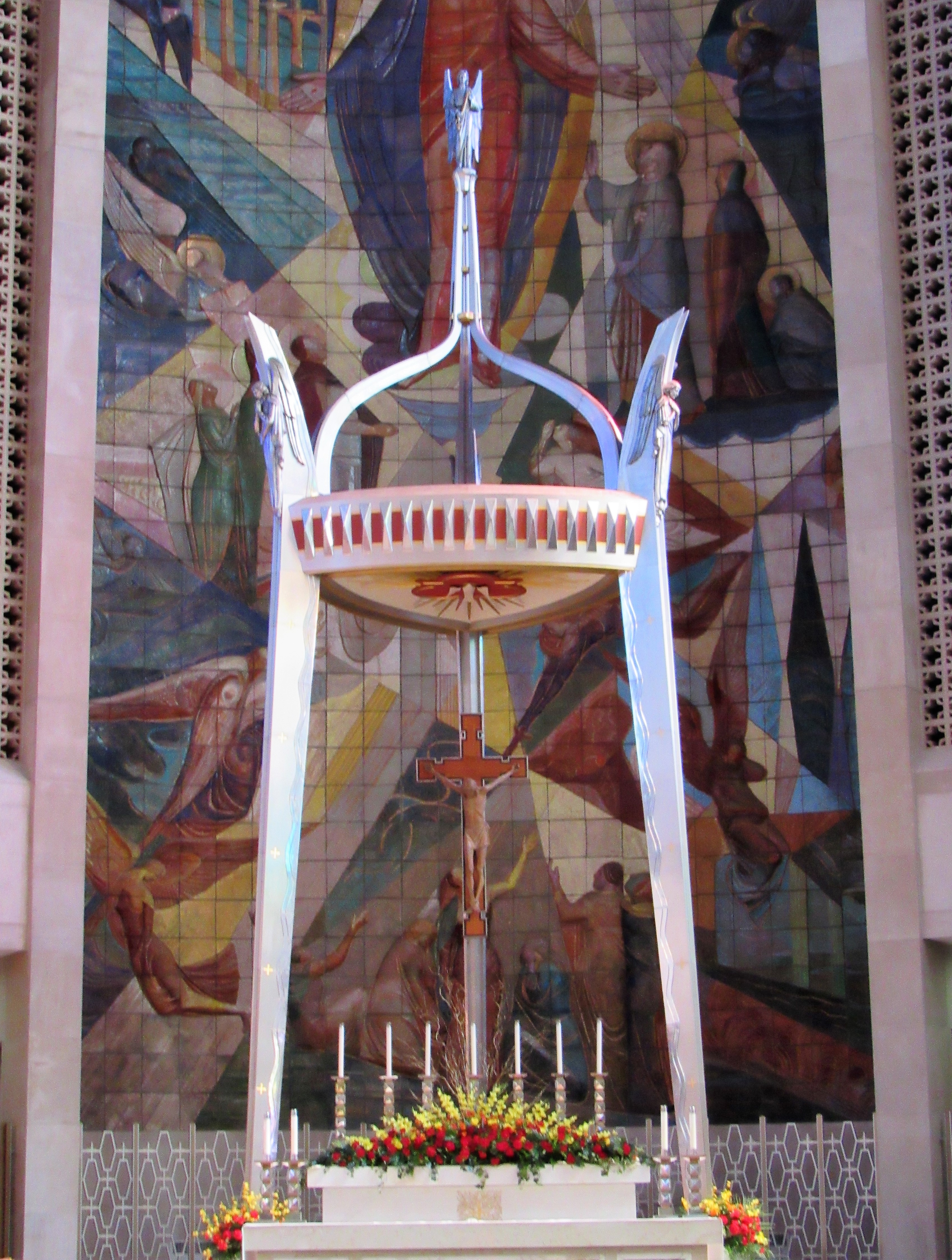
Baldachin

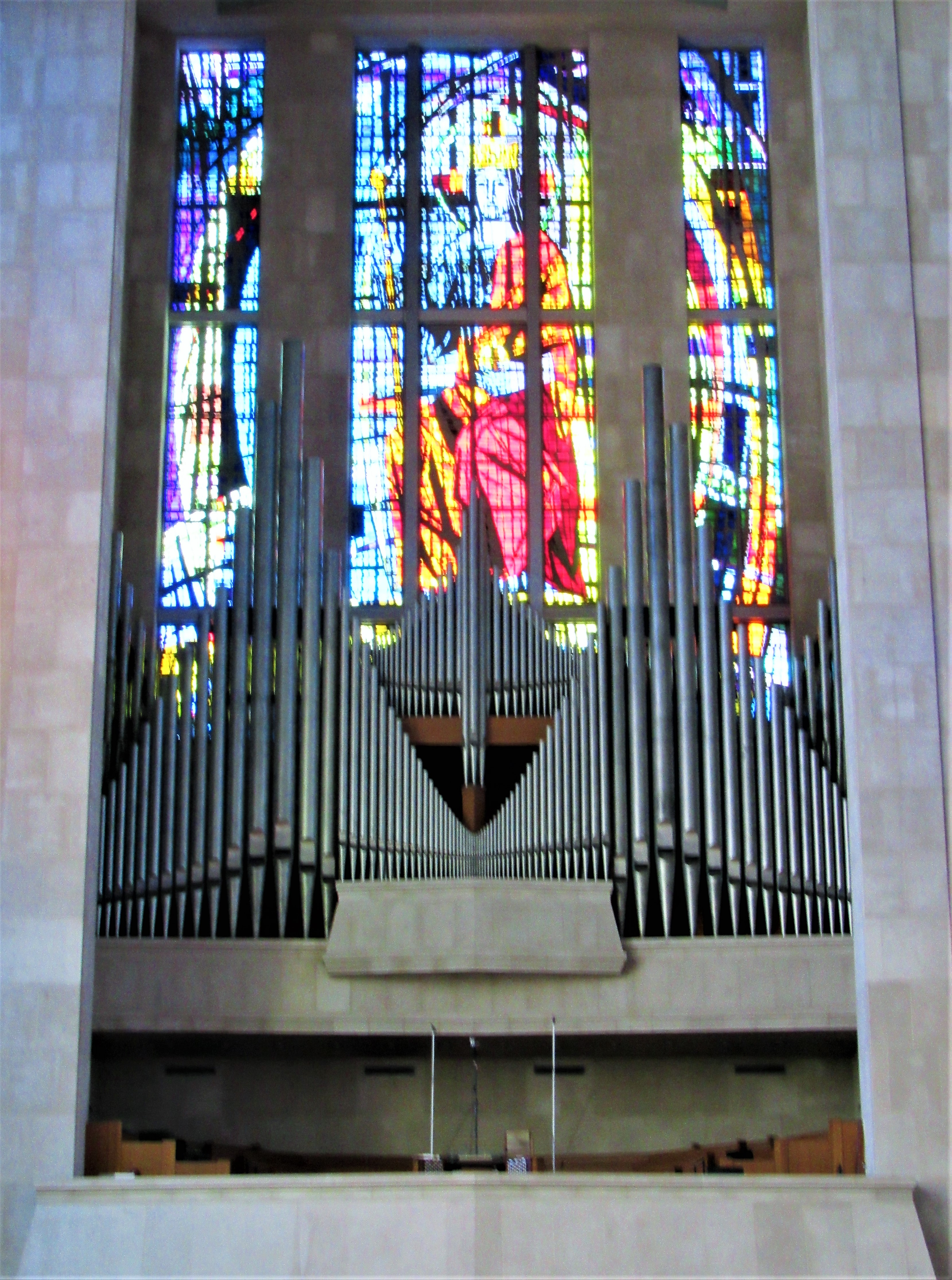
Rear gallery pipe organ

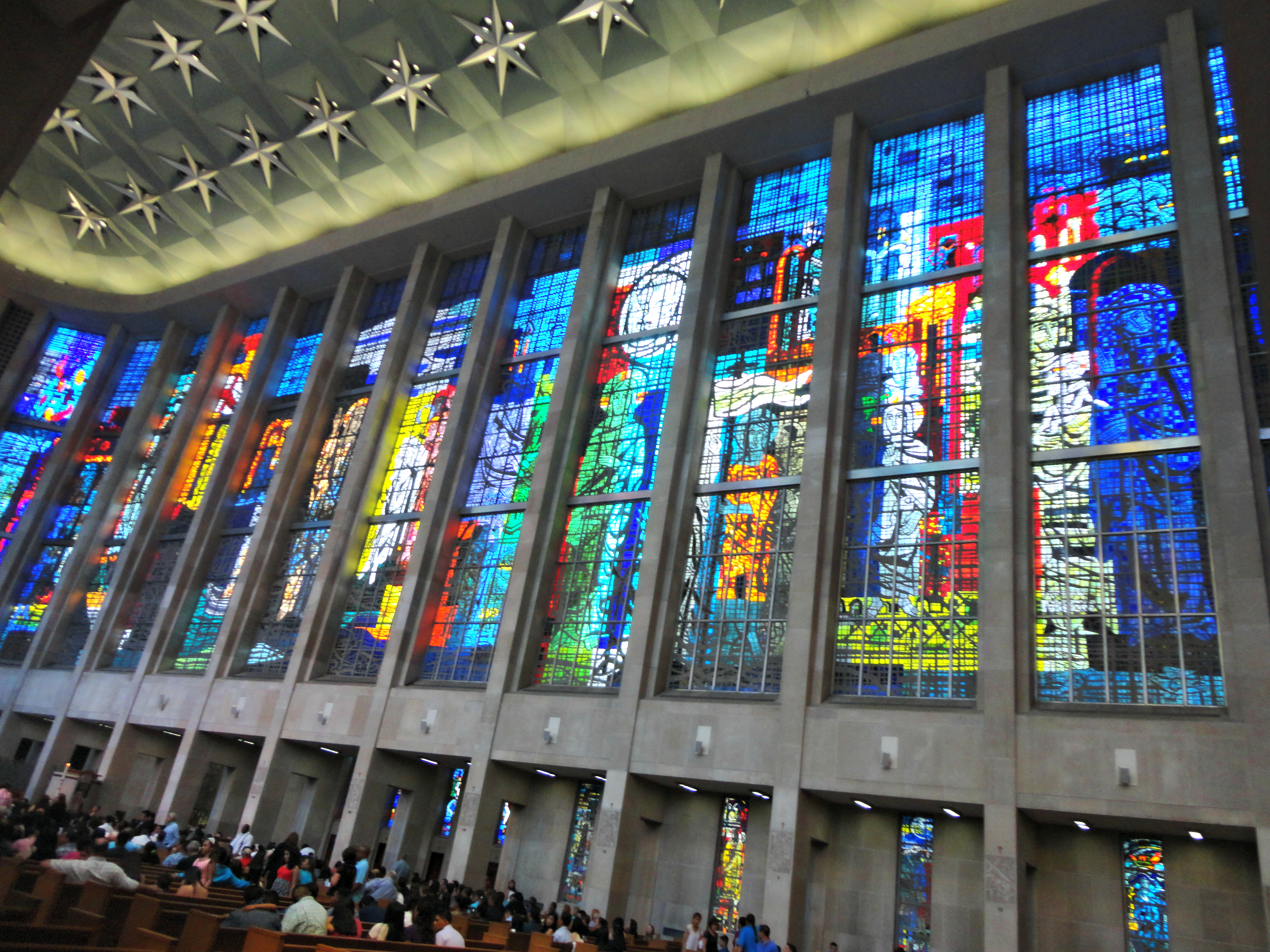
Stained glass on east wall

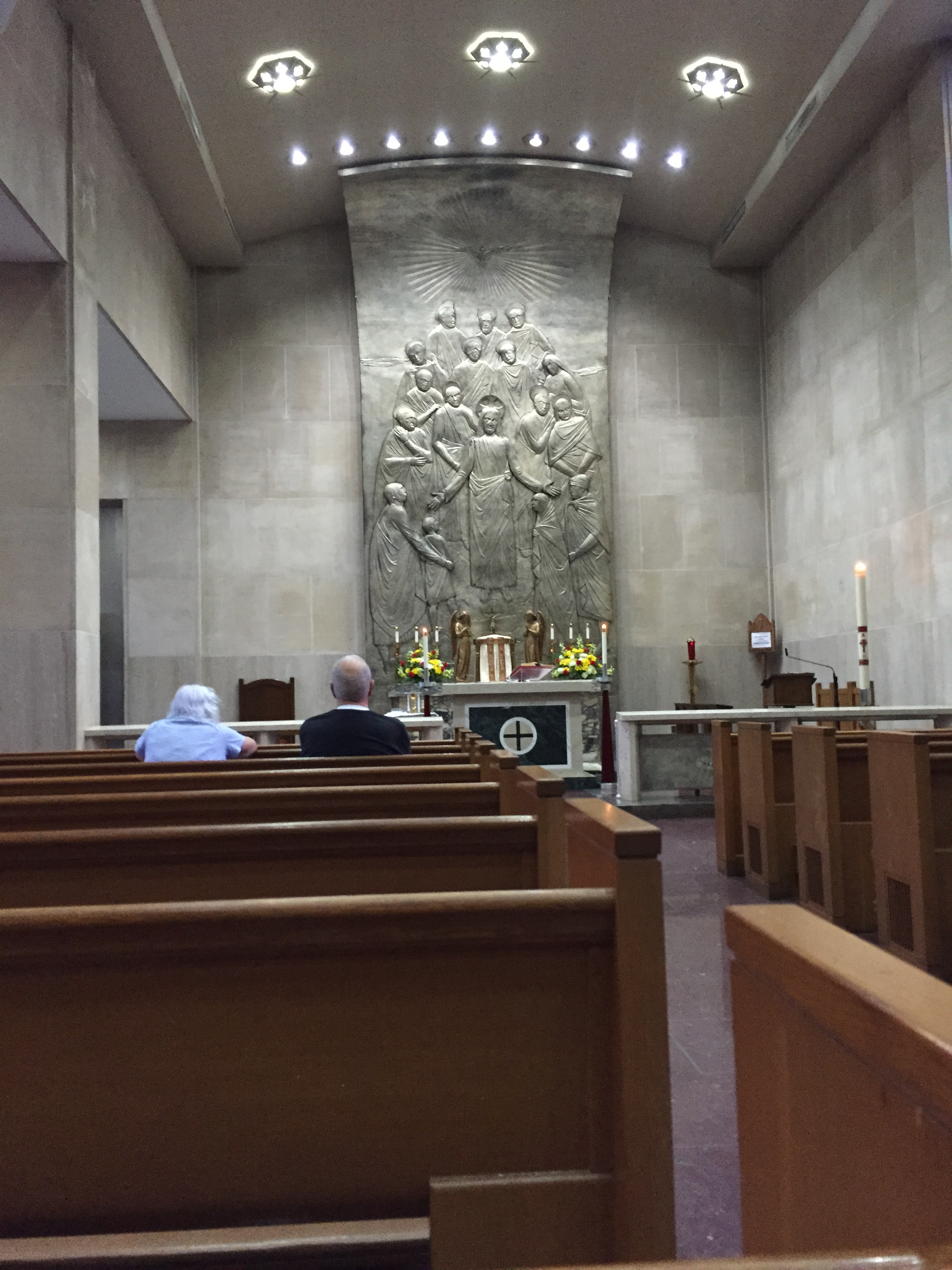
Blessed Sacrament Chapel

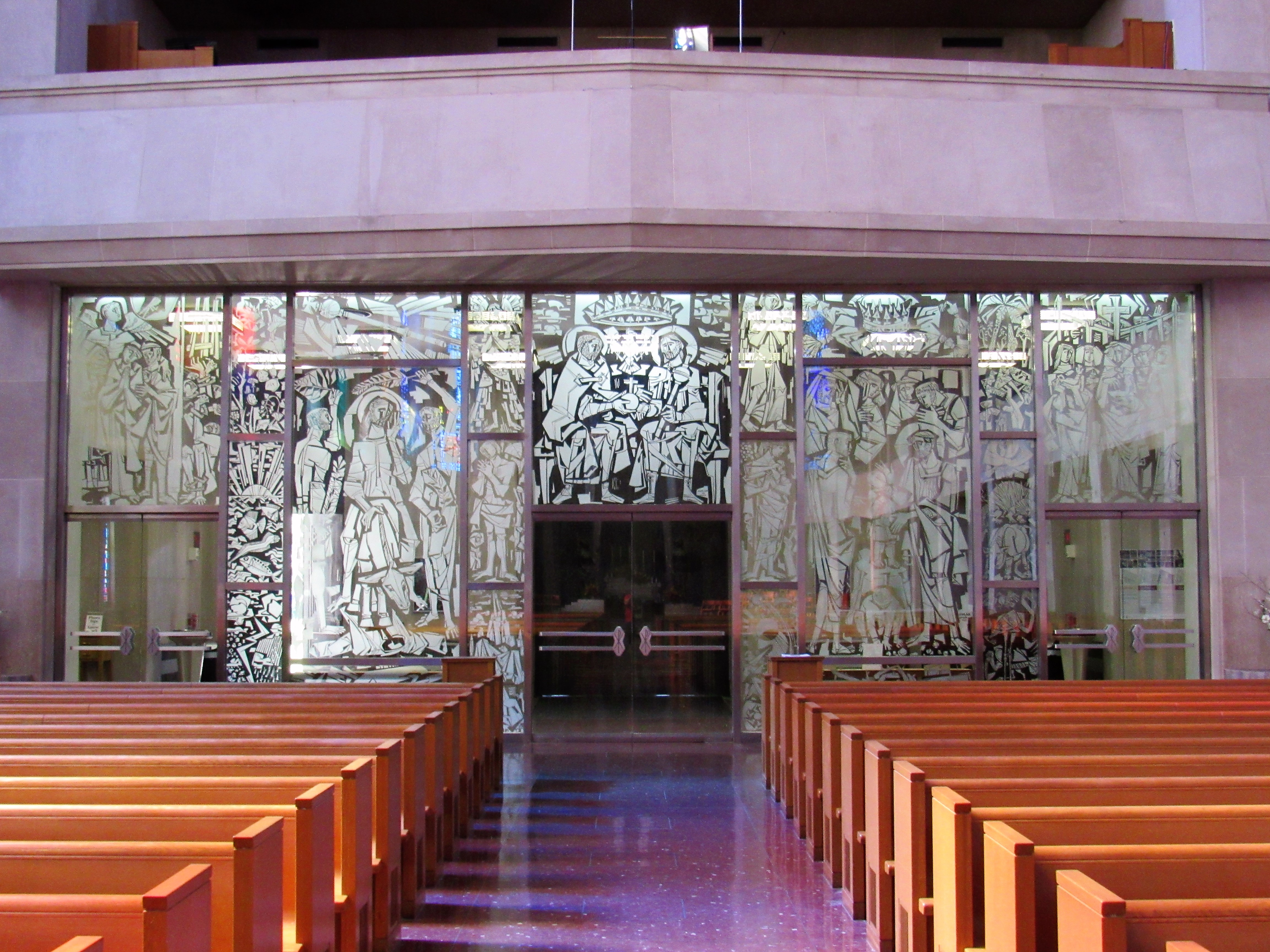
Etched glass wall in narthex

== See also ==
- List of Catholic cathedrals in the United States
- List of cathedrals in the United States
