= Maria Goretti (film) =

2003 Italian TV movie

- Written by: Franco Bernini
- Directed by: Giulio Base
- Starring: Martina Pinto; Fabrizio Bucci; Massimo Bonetti; Luisa Ranieri; Flavio Insinna; Claudia Koll; Marco Messeri; Luca Biagini
- Composers: Andrea Morricone; Ennio Morricone
- Original language: Italian

Production
- Producer: Luca Bernabei
- Cinematography: Fabrizio Lucci
- Editor: Roberto Siciliano
- Running time: 100 minutes

Original release
- Network: Rai 1
- Release: 2003

Maria Goretti is a 2003 Italian television movie directed by Giulio Base and starring Martina Pinto in the title role. The film is based on real life events of Catholic virgin martyr and saint Maria Goretti.

== Cast ==
- Martina Pinto as Maria Goretti
- Fabrizio Bucci as Alessandro Serenelli
- Massimo Bonetti as Luigi Goretti
- Luisa Ranieri as Assunta Goretti
- Flavio Insinna as Father Basilio Morganti
- Claudia Koll as Countess Mazzoleni
- Marco Messeri as Don Temistocle Signori
- Luca Biagini as Count Atilio Mazzoleni
- Manrico Gammarota as Giovanni Serenelli
- Anna Rita Del Piano as Teresa Cimarelli
- Giulio Base as Doctor Bartoli
