= Asylum Avenue District =

Historic district in Connecticut, United States

- U.S. National Register of Historic Places
- U.S. Historic district
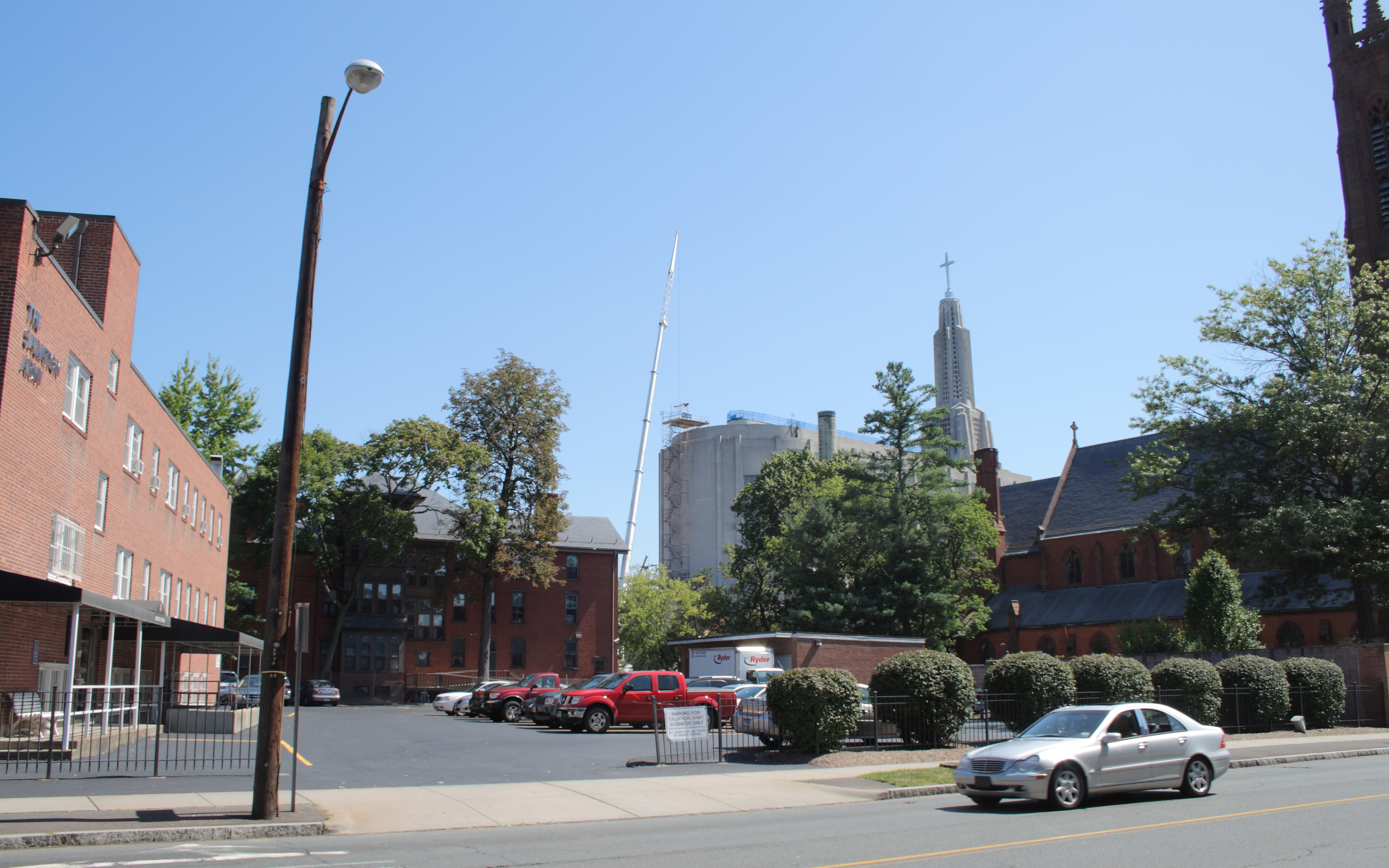

- Location within Connecticut Location within the United States
- Location: Asylum and Farmington Avenues, and Sigourney Street Hartford, Connecticut
- Coordinates: 41°46′10″N 72°41′36″W
- Area: 25 acres (10 ha)
- Architect: Keely, Patrick C.; Multiple
- Architectural style: Italianate
- MPS: Asylum Hill MRA
- NRHP reference No.: 79002672
- Added to NRHP: November 29, 1979

The Asylum Avenue District encompasses the institutional core of the Asylum Hill neighborhood of Hartford, Connecticut. Located just west of Downtown Hartford across Interstate 84, it includes four churches, a school, and a handful of adjacent 19th-century residences. It was listed on the National Register of Historic Places in 1979.

== Description and history ==
The Asylum Avenue District is centered on a stretch of Sigourney Street, between Asylum and Farmington Avenues, both major arteries leading west from downtown Hartford. Extending east and west from that road are the institutional buildings that make up the heart of Asylum Hill. The northeastern corner of the district is marked by the Asylum Hill Congregational Church, a Gothic Revival brownstone built in 1865. It is a rare example of a Congregational church designed by Patrick C. Keely, most of whose work was for the Roman Catholic Church. At the southeastern corner is the Cathedral of St. Joseph, the cathedral church of the Roman Catholic Archdiocese of Hartford. It was built in the early 1960s to a design by Eggers & Higgins in the International style, replacing a Gothic brownstone designed by Keely that was destroyed by fire.

West of St. Joseph's stands the Trinity Episcopal Church, built in 1892 in the English Country Church style out of red brick. Across Sigourney Street from Trinity is the campus of the West Middle School, which includes a 1930 Georgian Revival building and an older Romanesque structure. At the northwestern corner of the district stands the Asylum Avenue Baptist Church, A Collegiate Gothic building built in 1931 on the site of an 1872 church. Between It and the Congregational Church are a row of fine houses dating to the mid-to-late 19th century Victorian period.

Prior to its development in the mid-19th-century, the Asylum Hill area was mostly farmland owned by the locally prominent Goodwin family. Francis Goodwin was rector of Trinity Church, and some of the Goodwin land was purchased for the construction of St. Joseph's. The Baptist Church came about through the initiative of Jonathan Niles, for whom Niles Street is named.

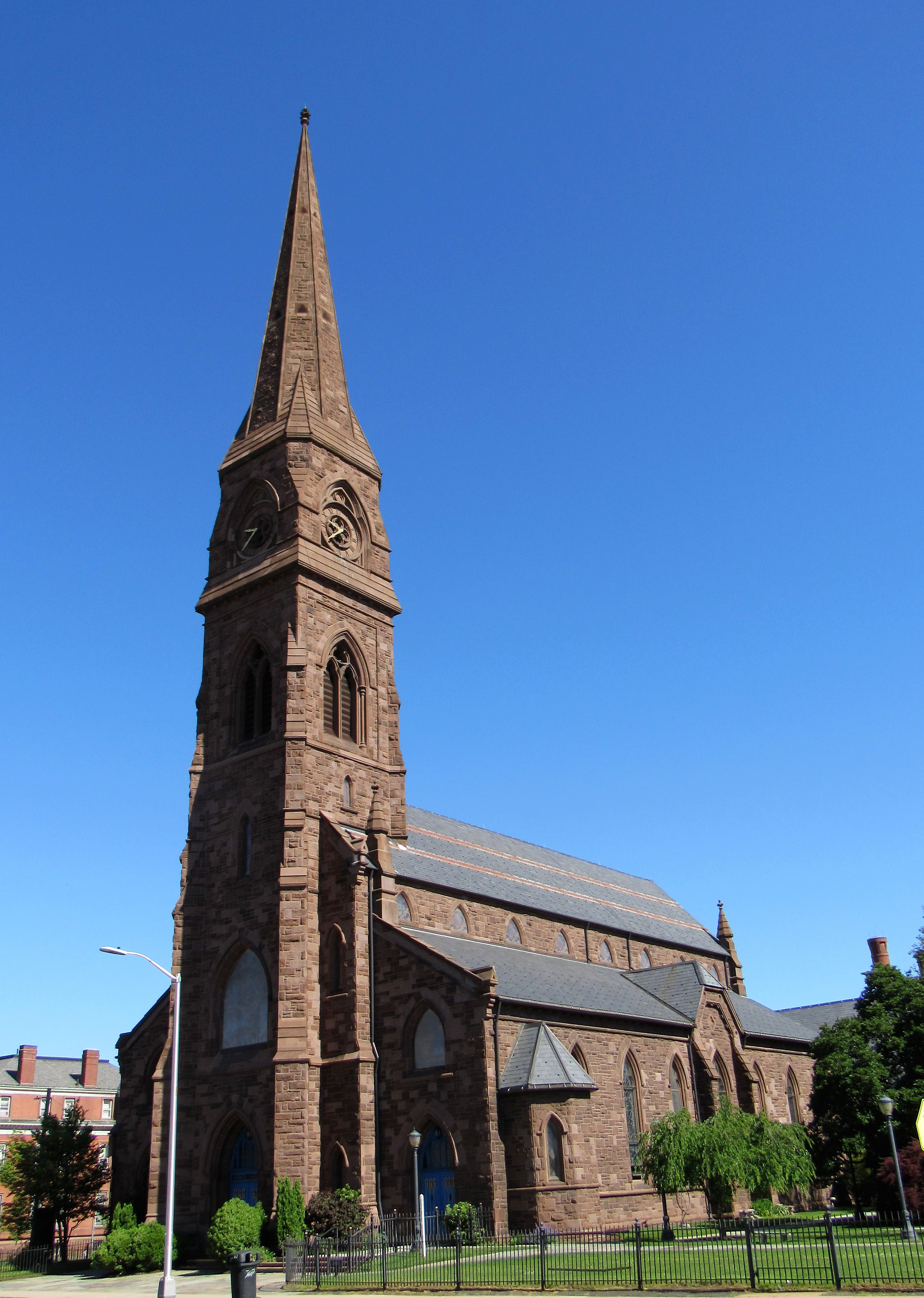
Asylum Hill Congregational Church

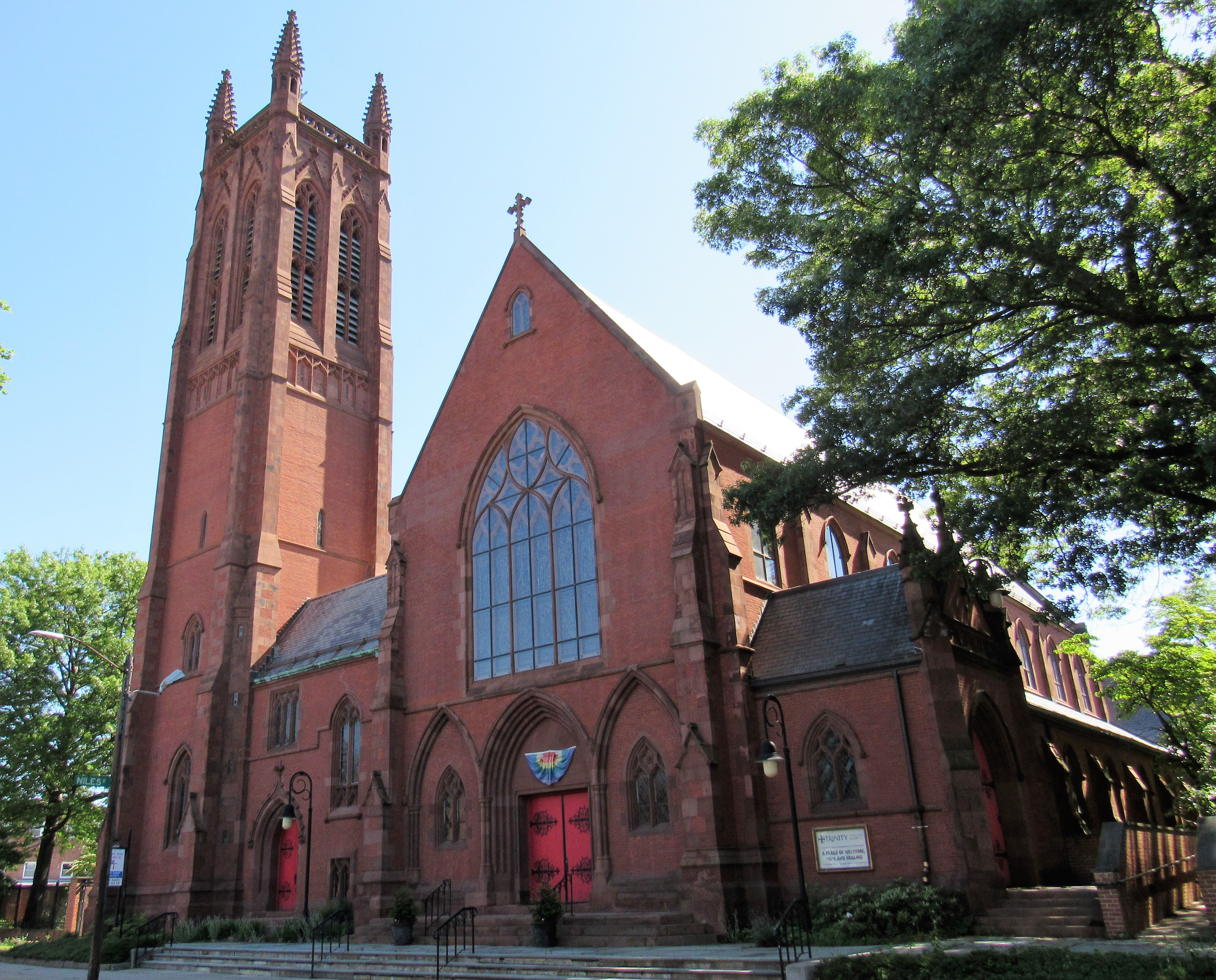
Trinity Episcopal Church

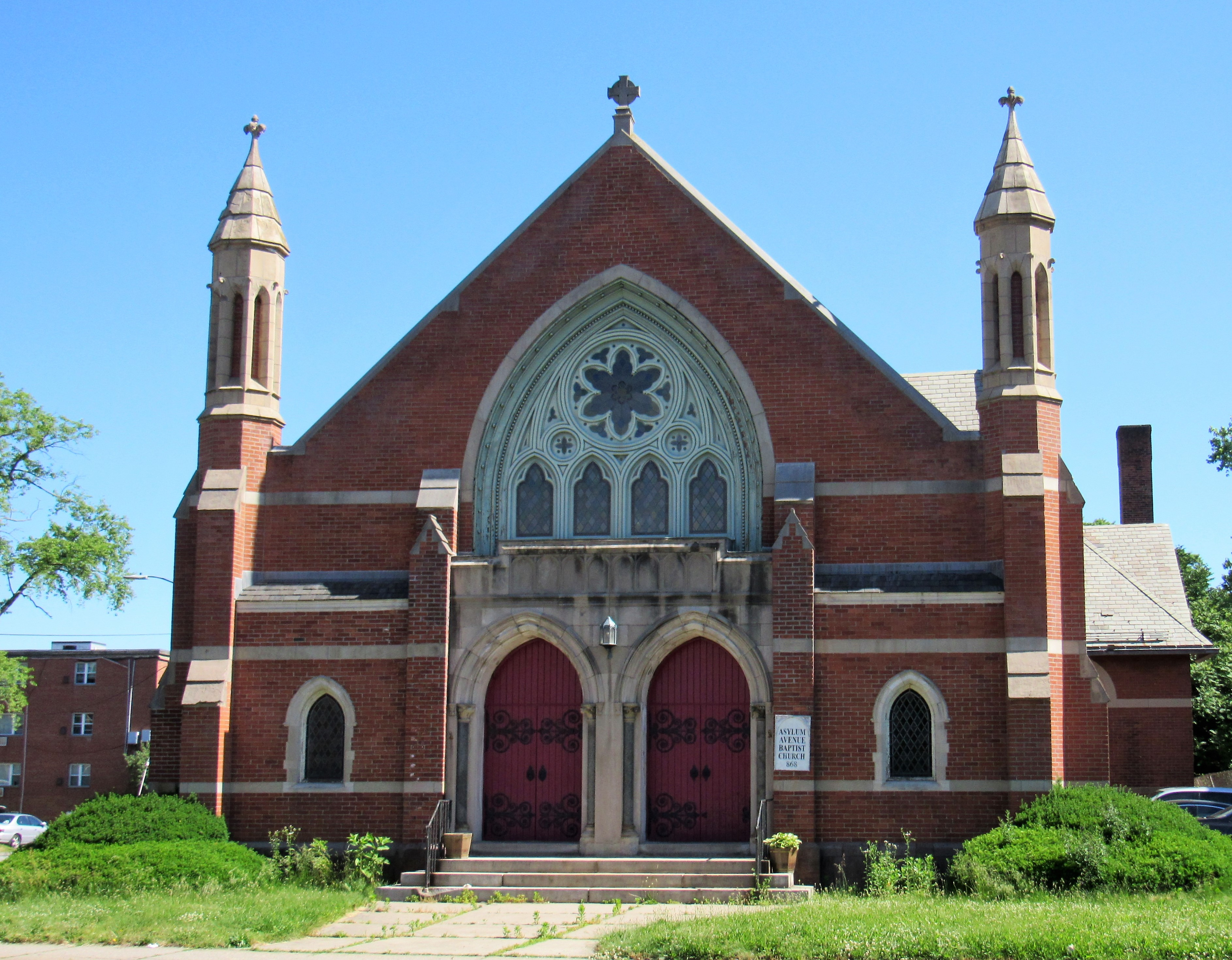
Asylum Avenue Baptist Church

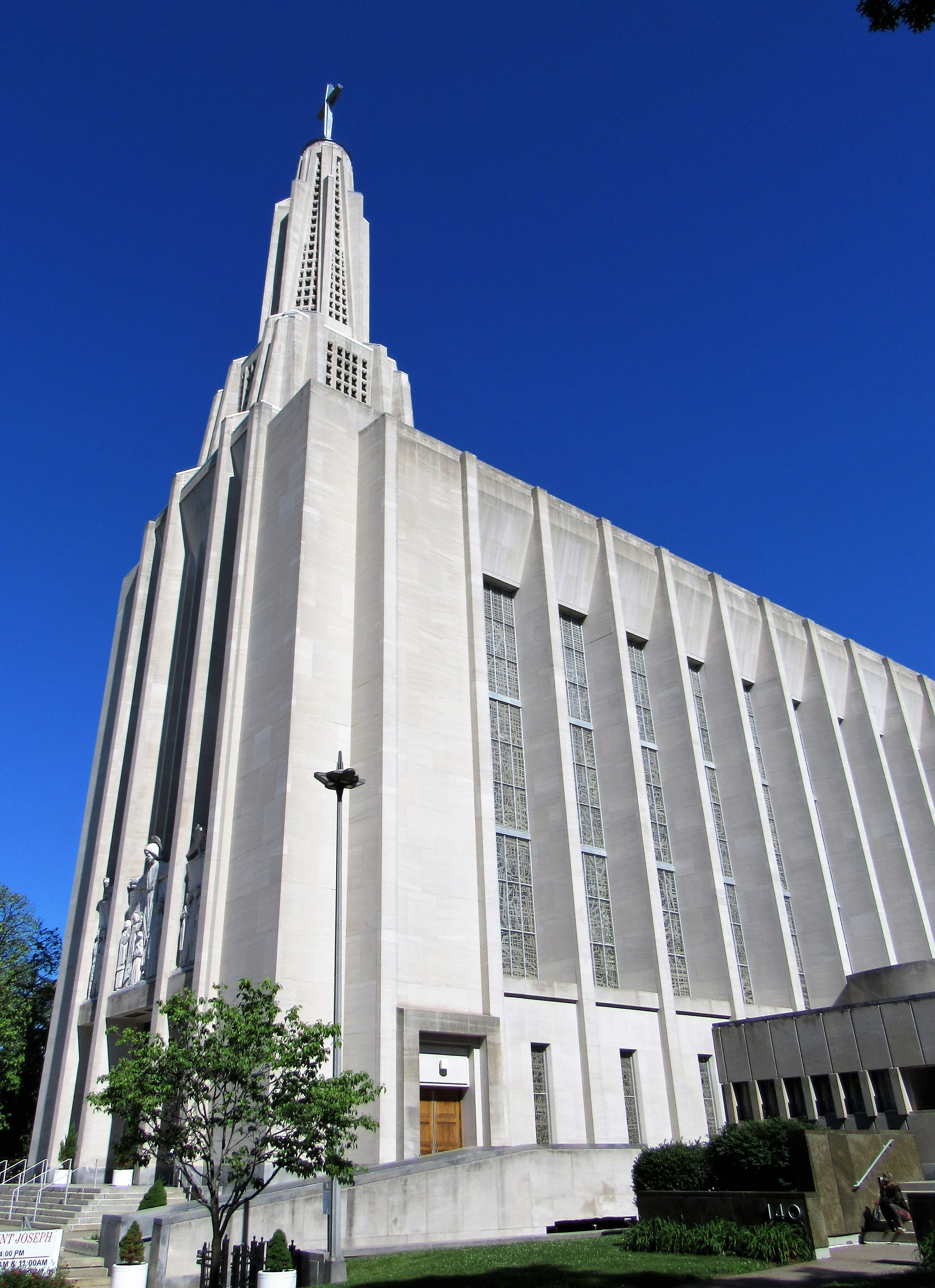
Cathedral of St. Joseph

== See also ==
- National Register of Historic Places listings in Hartford, Connecticut
