= Prosper Grech =

Maltese Catholic cardinal (1925–2019)

His Eminence Prosper Grech OSA
- Cardinal Deacon of Santa Maria Goretti
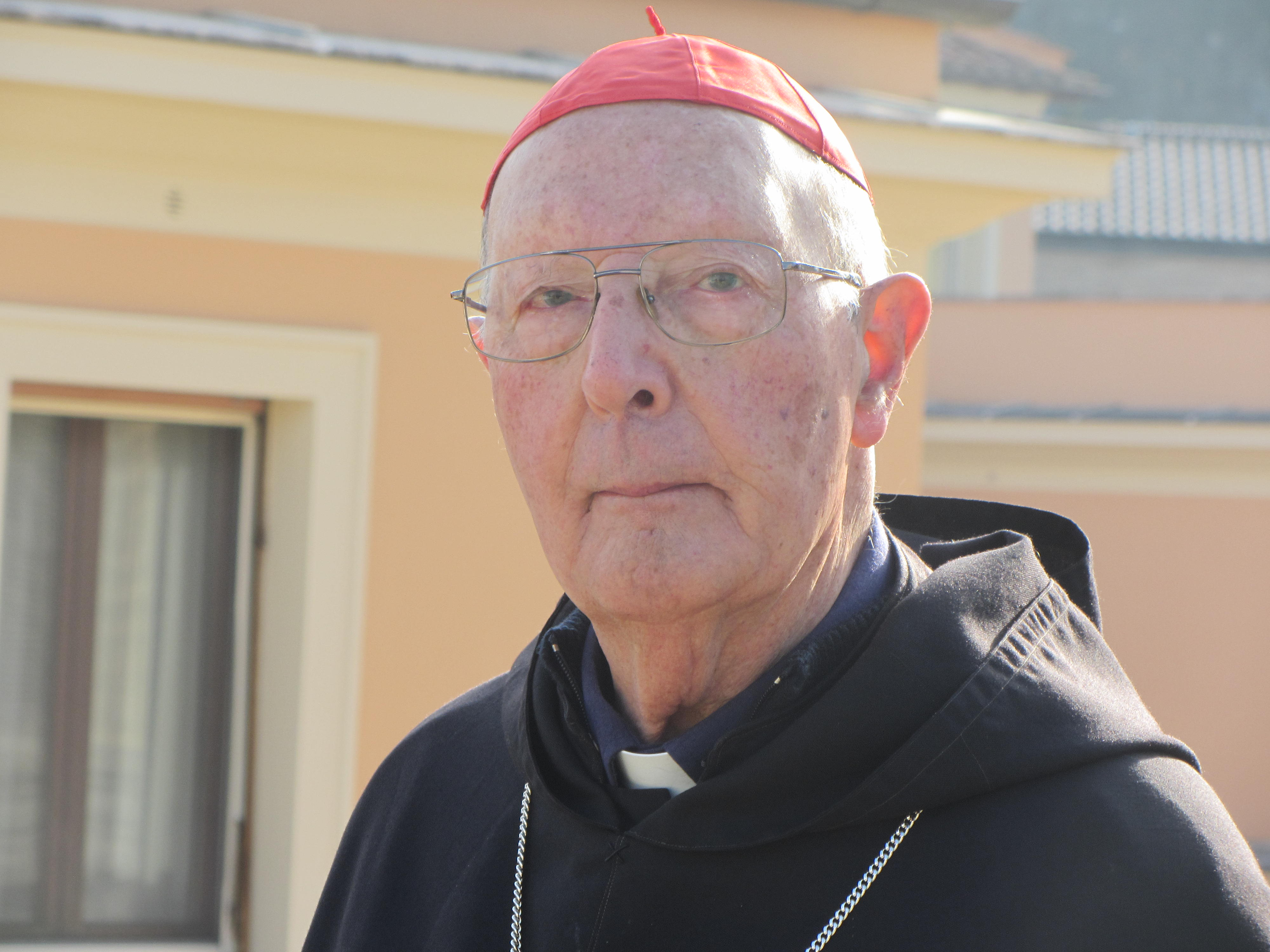
- Cardinal Grech in 2014
- Appointed: 18 February 2012
- Successor: Agostino Marchetto
- Previous post: Titular Archbishop of San Leone (2012)

Orders
- Ordination: 25 March 1950
- Consecration: 8 February 2012 by Paul Cremona
- Created cardinal: 18 February 2012 by Benedict XVI
- Rank: Cardinal deacon

Personal details
- Born: Stanley Grech; 24 December 1925 Vittoriosa, Crown Colony of Malta
- Died: 30 December 2019 (aged 94) Rome, Italy
- Denomination: Roman Catholic
- Education: Pontifical Gregorian University; Pontifical Biblical Institute; University of Fribourg; University of Oxford; University of Cambridge
- Motto: In te Domine speravi ('In you, Lord, I take refuge'; Psalm 71:1)

Styles of Prosper Grech
- Reference style: His Eminence
- Spoken style: Your Eminence
- Religious style: Cardinal
- Informal style: Cardinal

Prosper Grech OSA (24 December 1925 – 30 December 2019) was a Maltese Augustinian friar, who co-founded the Patristic Institute Augustinianum in Rome. He was created a cardinal by Pope Benedict XVI on 18 February 2012. He was the second Maltese member of the College of Cardinals, the first since 1843. (Note: The first was Fabrizio Sceberras Testaferrata (1757-1843).)

== Formation and studies ==
Born Stanley Grech in Vittoriosa, Malta, on 24 December 1925, he studied at the Lyceum. He took the name Prospero when he joined the Augustinian Order in 1943. While Malta was under siege during the Second World War, Grech served as a gunner in the Royal Malta Artillery. He was ordained to the priesthood at the Basilica of Saint John Lateran in Rome on 25 March 1950.

Grech studied philosophy at St. Mark's Priory, Rabat, Malta, and theology in St. Monica's College, Rome. He earned a doctorate in theology at the Gregorian University, Rome (1953), obtained a licentiate in sacred scripture from the Pontifical Biblical Institute, Rome (1954), and a diploma in educational psychology from University of Fribourg, Switzerland (1951). Grech conducted research in Semitic languages at the universities of Oxford (1957–58) and Cambridge (1958–59).

== Teaching ==
In 1959, Grech was appointed lecturer at the Augustinian Theological College, Rabat. He also served as professor at the Augustine Institute and joined the staff of the Vicar General for Vatican City. As secretary to the Vicar General, Bishop Petrus Canisius Van Lierde, who was sacristan of the Apostolic Palace, his duties included dressing Pope John XXIII and Pope Paul VI for liturgical functions. During the 1963 Papal conclave, he heard Giovanni Battista Montini's confession a couple of hours prior to his election as Pope Paul VI. In 1970, together with Fr. Agostino Trapè, Grech founded the Patristic Institute Augustinianum attached to the Lateran University in Rome and served as its president from 1971 to 1979. He was a member of the Studiorum Novi Testamenti Societas (SNTS); he became a member of the Pontifical Academy of Theology in 2003 and of the Pontifical Biblical Commission in 2004.

Grech lectured on hermeneutics for over thirty years at the Pontifical Biblical Institute in Rome. He became a consultor to the Congregation for the Doctrine of the Faith in 1984 and went to India on behalf of the congregation as an apostolic visitor of seminaries in 1998.

Grech authored various articles and publications and presented lectures on the Bible, hermeneutics and patristics. On 13 December 2011, he was appointed a Companion of the National Order of Merit of the Republic of Malta.

== Cardinal ==
Pope Benedict XVI announced on 6 January 2012 that he would create Grech a cardinal, together with 21 others, on 18 February 2012. He was the first Augustinian made a cardinal in 111 years.

As canon law requires cardinals to be bishops unless they receive special dispensation, Grech was consecrated a bishop on 8 February 2012 by Paul Cremona, Archbishop of Malta, assisted by Archbishop Giuseppe Versaldi, and Mario Grech, Bishop of Gozo. He took the episcopal motto In te Domine speravi ('In you, Lord, I take refuge'), from the opening words of Psalm 71.

He was created a cardinal deacon by Pope Benedict XVI in a consistory on 18 February 2012 and assigned the titular church of Santa Maria Goretti. Grech delivered the opening meditation at the 2013 papal conclave, but his age prevented him from participating as an elector. He warned that the Church was always threatened by disunity: "Between ultra-traditionalist extremists and ultra-progressive extremists, between priests rebelling against obedience and those who don't recognize the signs of the times, there always will be the risk of small schisms that not only damage the church, but go against the will of God." He raised the issue of how the Church hierarchy was handling the sexual abuse crisis: "Today many people are not able to come to believe in Christ because his face is obscured or hidden behind an institution that lacks transparency." When Pope Francis marked the 50th anniversary of the founding of the Augustinianum, he praised Grech for the "grandiose simplicity" his sermons had achieved in his old age.

Grech died in Rome's Santo Spirito Hospital on 30 December 2019.
