= János Hajnal =

Hungarian naturalized-Italian artist and illustrator

János “Giovanni” Hajnal (Budapest, 27 August 1913 – Rome, 9 October 2010) was a Hungarian naturalized Italian artist and illustrator. He is considered one of the major contemporary creator of glass walls and mosaics.

Hungarian born, Hajnal graduated from the Art Academy in Budapest; he then attended art academies in Frankfurt, Stockholm and Rome.[1] He started his artistic profession as book illustrator which he continued to pursue throughout his career.

Hajnal visited Italy for the first time in 1931 when he walked from Budapest to Florence in order to admire Italian art.[1] He relocated permanently in Rome in 1948 at the age of 35.

In Italy his artistic career was mainly based on glass walls and mosaics. He was granted Italian citizenship in 1958 due to his artistic merits. In 1992 the Hungarian President granted Hajnal the Cross for Civil Merits, the highest Hungarian award for in the art field. The Council of Art Academy of Budapest unanimously nominated him Magister Rerum Artium Honoris Causa. In 2002 the Italian president Azeglio Ciampi awarded him the Ordine al merito della Repubblica Italiana (a high honour award). Hajnal died in Rome on October 9, 2010.[2]

== Works ==
=== Glass walls in the Milan Cathedral ===
Hajnal's collaboration with the Veneranda Fabbrica del Duomo di Milano dated back to 1953 when he won the bid to create three glass walls of 35 square meters for the façade of the cathedral. These glass walls were launched in 1955 and represent The Church (5.75m high), The Trinity (9.5m) and The Synagogue (5.75m). In 1988 he realised a wide glass wall (25 square meters and 18m high) called La Vetrata dei Cardinali (The Glass Wall of the Cardinals), launched in 1989. This is situated in the external right nave and represents the cardinals Alfredo Ildefonso Schuster and Andrea Carlo Ferrari. This work completed the series of glass walls for the cathedral which were started in the 15th century.

=== Glass walls in the Aula Paolo VI ===
Hajnal created two wide glass walls for the Aula Paolo VI, an auditorium in the Vatican which was opened in 1971. The two glass walls measure 180 square meters.

=== Other glass walls ===
Hajnal's works can also be admired in Rome in the churches of San Leone Magno, Santa Maria Goretti, Sant’Angela Merici and San Pietro Nolasco; also in the Collegio Scozzese, in the Canadian National Church, in the basilica of Santa Francesca Romana, in the new Rebibbia penitentiary, in the National Swedish Church, in the convent of Santa Brigida and in the institute of the Ursoline nuns. Among his major recent works in Rome is the rose window in the façade of the basilica of Santa Maria Maggiore (4.5m diameter), completed in 1995[2] . Hajnal completed glass walls in many other Italian locations: Velletri, Vetralla, Prato, Gaeta, Teramo, Frosinone, Avezzano, Carpinello Casciano (Naples), Milano, Catania, Udine, Castagno d’Elsa (Tuscany), Bari, Sorrento, Lavello (Potenza), Chieti, L’Aquila, Farfa, Formia, Tarquinia, Carsoli, Latina and the sanctuary of Montevergine. One of the major recent works outside of Rome there are the three monumental glass walls (263 square meters) representing the Trinity completed in 1999 for the basilica of San Francesco da Paola in the town of Paola (Cosenza). Hajnal had also worked on glass walls outside of Italy, mainly in São Paulo (Brasil), Hartford (Connecticut), Oakland (California) and Lucerne (Switzerland). Of particular importance is the three major glass walls for the Cathedral of Palma de Majorca completed in 1995[2]

=== Mosaic works ===
Hajnal also was a mosaic artist. His creations can be found both in Italy and around the world. In Rome his main works are located in the churches of San Leone Magno, Saint Peter's and Paul, in the Collegio Scozzese, Canadian National Church and the Istituto delle Figlie di Maria Immacolata. Other works can be found in Velletri, Bari, Frascati, Teramo, Molfetta, Firenze, Chieti, Gaeta, Formia, Tarquinia, San Benedetto del Tronto. Particularly important are the mosaics created for the Sanctuary of Montevergine in 1980 (182 square meters) and the one for the basilica of San Francesco da Paola in 2000-2001. Other significant works has been completed in Caracas (Venezuela), St Paul (Minnesota), Lincoln (Nebraska), Dublin (Ireland) and elsewhere.

=== Book illustrations ===
Hajnal's glass walls and mosaics mainly represent sacred themes whilst in his book illustration we find both sacred and secular themes. In 1969 he drew 120 illustrations for Marcello Camillucci's book Ne Angelo ne Bestia. In 1971 he illustrated 15 drawings for the book Impressioni Romane. In 1986 he painted 32 pictures representing the life of San Guglielmo, founder of the monastery of Montevergine, for the book Episodi della vita di San Guglielmo. In 1989 he produced 20 tempera paintings for Cardinal Virgilio Noe's book. In 2000 the book Il Fascino di Dio was published; here he was commissioned to draw tempera illustrations representing Agostinian saints. Hajnal collaborated with a number of journals and magazines including Avvenire, Osservatore Romano, Discussione, Fiera Letteraria, Solathia, and Ecos. In 1988 he drew the front page and 6 other illustration for the novel La Soglia della Yurta by Paolo Andreocci[3]. Hajnal also specialized in engraving illustrations dedicated to Dante's Divina Commedia, Virgil's Bucoliche, Trilussa's Sonetti and Jonathan Swift's Gulliver's Travels.

=== Stamps ===
Hajnal illustrated a number of stamp series for the Vatican. Notable works include: 4 stamps in 1983 for the Holy Year; in 1985 the commemorative series for Saint Cyril and Metodio; in 1993 4 stamps for the Seville's International Eucharistic Congress; in 1994 for the International Year of the Family; and in 1998 5 stamps dedicated to the Pope's travels. In 2006 the journal Cronaca Filatelica dedicated its front page to Hajnal's stamp creations. Other works In Hungary his works are exposed in Budapest in the Museum of Art and in the Museum of the Capital and in private collections.

== Bibliography ==
• Ernesto Brivio, Le vetrate istoriate del Duomo di Milano: la fede narrata dall’arte della luce, Nuove Edizioni Duomo-Veneranda Fabbrica del Duomo, Milano, 1980 • Paolo Andreocci, Hajnal, il vetratista, Ecos, giugno-luglio, 1981 • Claudia Zaccagnini, Giovanni Hajnal vetratista nella cattedrale di Velletri, Pisa, Pacini Editore, 2013; • Claudia Zaccagnini, La prima vetrata di Giovanni Hajnal nella chiesa di San Leone I sulla Via Prenestina, in Rivista di Studi Ungheresi, 12 (2013), pp. 181–187.
