= Santa Maria Goretti, Rio Grande do Sul =

Coordinates: 30°00′21″S 51°10′32″W

Santa Maria Goretti is a neighbourhood (bairro) in the city of Porto Alegre, the state capital of Rio Grande do Sul, in Brazil. It was created by Law 2688 from December 25, 1963.
