= Maria Goretti =

Italian virgin-martyr of the Catholic Church

Saint Maria Goretti
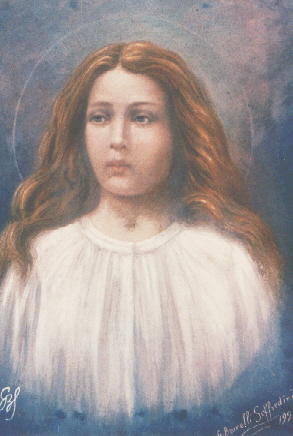
- Portrait of Goretti, 1929

Virgin and martyr
- Born: 16 October 1890; Corinaldo, Province of Ancona, Marche, Kingdom of Italy
- Died: 6 July 1902 (aged 11); Nettuno, Province of Rome, Lazio, Kingdom of Italy
- Venerated in: Catholic Church
- Beatified: 27 April 1947, Saint Peter's Basilica, Vatican City by Pope Pius XII
- Canonized: 24 June 1950, Saint Peter's Basilica, Vatican City by Pope Pius XII
- Major shrine: Nettuno, Province of Rome, Lazio, Italy
- Feast: 6 July (General Roman Calendar & Passionist Calendar)
- Attributes: lily; farmer's clothing; martyr's palm
- Patronage: Forgiveness, chastity, temptations to impurity, victims of rape, teenagers, modern youth, Children of Mary

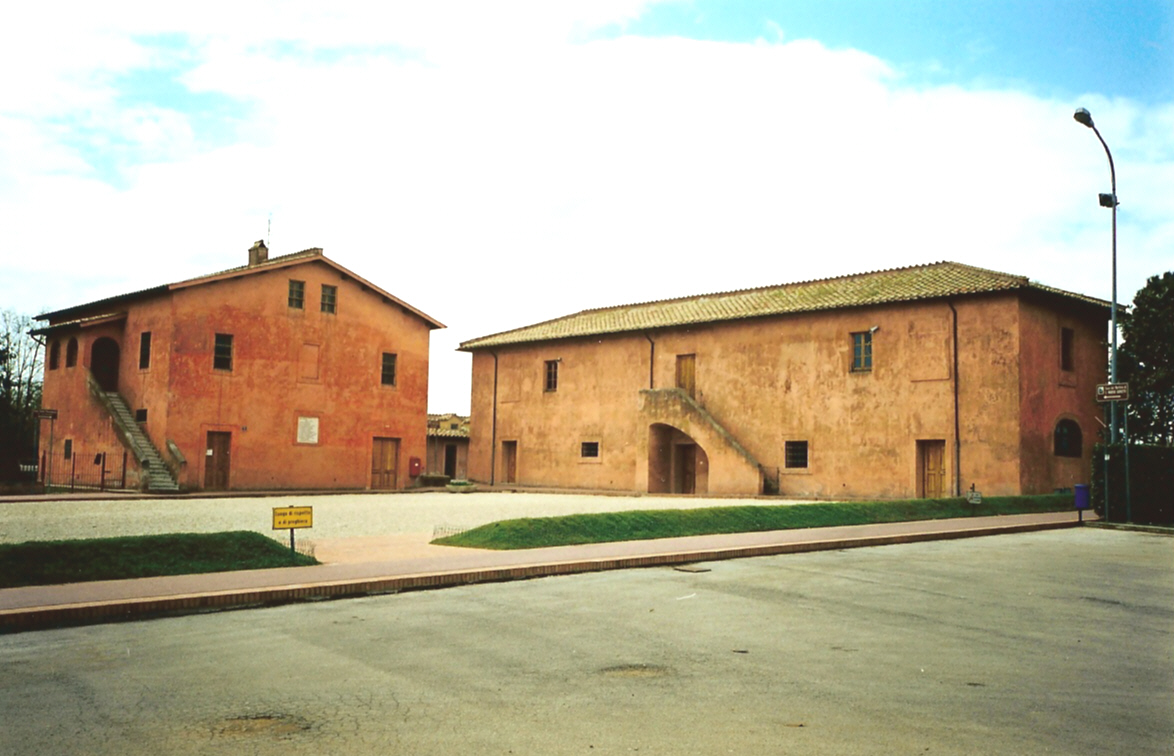
La Cascina Antica (right), the Goretti home (currently under the care of the Passionist sisters)

Maria Teresa Goretti (Italian: [maˈriːa teˈrɛːza ɡoˈretti]; 16 October 1890 – 6 July 1902) was an Italian virgin martyr of the Catholic Church, and one of the youngest saints to be canonized. She was born to a farming family. Her father died when she was nine, and the family had to share a house with another family, the Serenellis. She took over household duties while her mother and siblings worked in the fields.

One afternoon, Alessandro, the Serenellis' 20-year-old son, made sexual advances to her. When she refused to submit to him, he stabbed her 14 times. She was taken to the hospital but she died while forgiving him. He was arrested, convicted, and jailed. During imprisonment, he repented. After 27 years, he was released from prison and visited her mother to beg forgiveness, which she granted. He later became a lay brother in a Capuchin monastery and died in 1970. Maria was beatified in 1947 and canonized in 1950. She is especially venerated in the Congregation of the Passion (Passionists).

== Biography ==
Maria was born on 16 October 1890, in Corinaldo, in the Province of Ancona, then in the Kingdom of Italy, to Luigi Goretti and Assunta Carlini, the third of seven children: Antonio (who died in infancy), Angelo, Maria, Mariano (Marino), Alessandro (Sandrino), Ersilia, and Teresa.

By the time Maria was five, her family had become so poor that they were forced to give up their farm, move, and work for other farmers. In 1896, they moved to Colle Gianturco, near Paliano and Frosinone, about fifty miles outside Rome; and then in 1899 to Le Ferriere, near modern Latina and Nettuno in Lazio, where they lived in a building, "La Cascina Antica," they shared with another family which included Giovanni Serenelli and his son, Alessandro. Soon, her father became very sick with malaria, and died when she was just nine. While her mother and siblings worked in the fields, she would cook, sew, watch Teresa, and keep the house clean.

=== Death ===
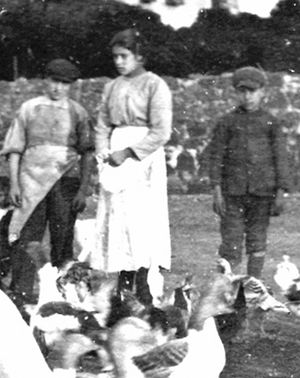
The only known photograph of Maria Goretti, dated to early 1902

On 5 July 1902, eleven-year-old Maria was sitting on the outside steps of her home, sewing one of Serenelli's shirts and watching Teresa, while Serenelli was threshing beans in the barnyard. Knowing she would be alone, Alessandro returned to the house and threatened to stab her with an awl if she did not do what he said; he was intending to rape her. She would not submit, however, protesting that what he wanted to do was a mortal sin and warning him that he would go to Hell. She fought desperately and kept screaming about the sinfulness of Alessandro's intentions. Alessandro choked Maria, then stabbed her fourteen times when she insisted she would rather die than submit to him; he then fled the scene, but not before stabbing Maria a further three times when she tried to reach the door.

Teresa awoke with the noise and started crying, and when Assunta and Giovanni came to check on her, they found Maria bleeding on the floor and took her to the nearest hospital in Nettuno. She underwent surgery without anesthesia, but her injuries were beyond the doctors' help. Halfway through the surgery, she woke up. The pharmacist said to her to think of him in Paradise. She looked at him and said "Well, who knows, which of us is going to be there first?" When the pharmacist replied that she would be first, Maria told him that she would "gladly" think of him. She also expressed concern for her mother's welfare. The day after the attack, having expressed forgiveness for Alessandro and stating that she wanted to have him in Heaven with her, Maria died of her injuries.

Journalist Noel Crusz provided a more detailed account:

On 6 July in 1902, at 3 pm whilst [Maria's mother] Assunta and the other children were at the threshing floor, Serenelli who persistently sought sexual favours from the 12-year-old [sic] girl approached her. She was taking care of her infant sister in the farmhouse. Allesandro [sic] threatened her with a 10-inch awl, and when she refused, as she had always done, he stabbed her 14 times. The wounds penetrated her throat, with lesions of the pericardium, heart, lungs, and diaphragm. Surgeons at Orsenigo were surprised that she was still alive. In a dying deposition, in the presence of the Chief of Police, she told her mother of Serenelli's sexual harassment, and two previous attempts made to rape her. She was afraid to reveal this earlier since she was threatened with death.

A third account of the assault was presented by Italian historian Giordano Bruno Guerri in 1985. He asserted that, while in prison, Alessandro stated that he did not complete the assault and Maria died a virgin. Guerri identifies the weapon as an awl rather than a dagger.

== Alessandro's imprisonment ==
Alessandro was captured shortly after the attack: the police taking him to prison overtook the ambulance taking Maria to the hospital. Originally, he was going to be sentenced to life, but since he was a minor at that time it was commuted to 30 years; judges even considered he was not as mature as he was expected to be for a 20-year-old, and that he grew up in a poor, neglectful family, with several brothers and relatives suffering from mental illness and an alcoholic father. A claim found in some secondary sources that Alessandro Serenelli avoided a death sentence because of a plea for mercy by Maria Goretti's mother is incorrect. At the time of the crime, capital punishment for ordinary crimes had already been abolished in Italy under the Penal Code of 1889, and therefore a death sentence was not legally possible in Serenelli's case. He insisted he had attempted to rape her several times and decided to kill her because of her refusal and desperate crying. He remained unrepentant and uncommunicative from the world for three years, until a local bishop, Monsignor Giovanni Blandini, visited him in jail. He wrote a thank you note to the Bishop asking for his prayers and telling him about a dream, "in which Maria gave him lilies, which burned immediately in his hands."

After his release, Alessandro visited Maria's mother, Assunta, and begged her forgiveness. She forgave him, and they attended Mass together the next day, receiving Holy Communion side by side. He reportedly prayed to Maria every day and referred to her as "my little saint."

Alessandro later became a lay brother of the Order of Friars Minor Capuchin, living in a monastery and working as its receptionist and gardener until he died in 1970 at age 87.

== Beatification and canonization ==
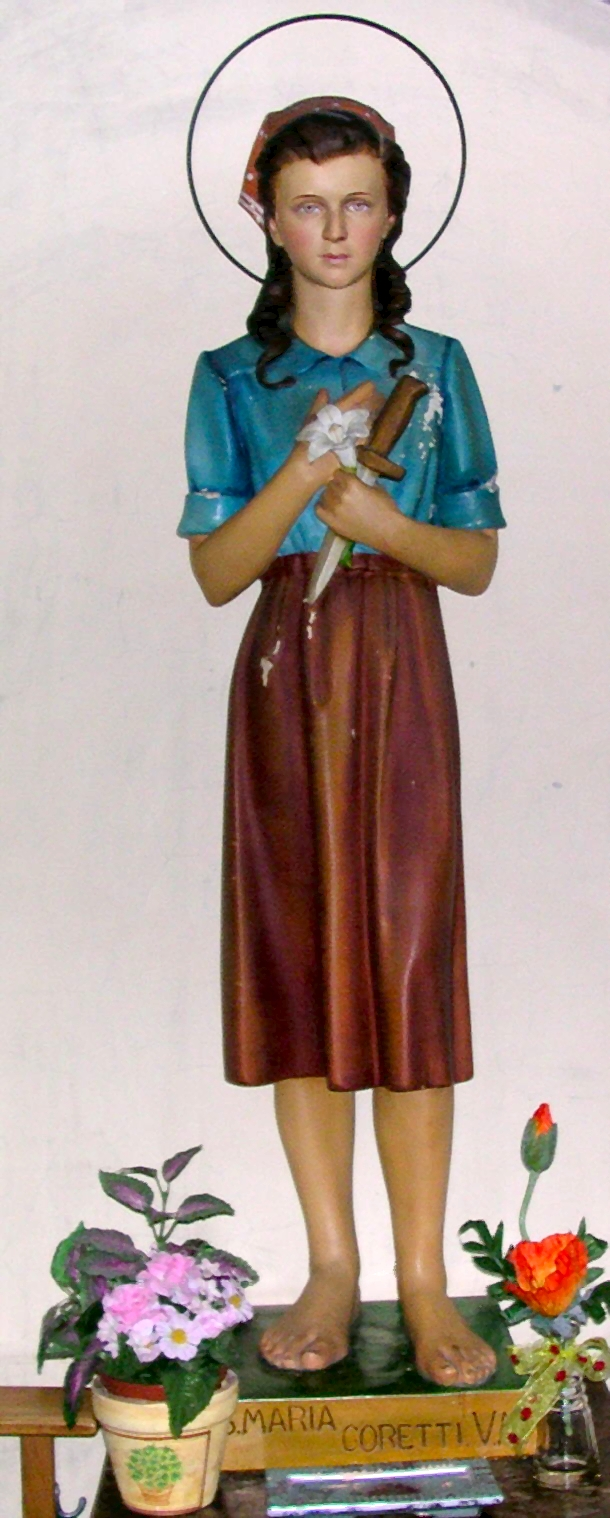
A statue of Maria in peasant garb holding lilies and a knife

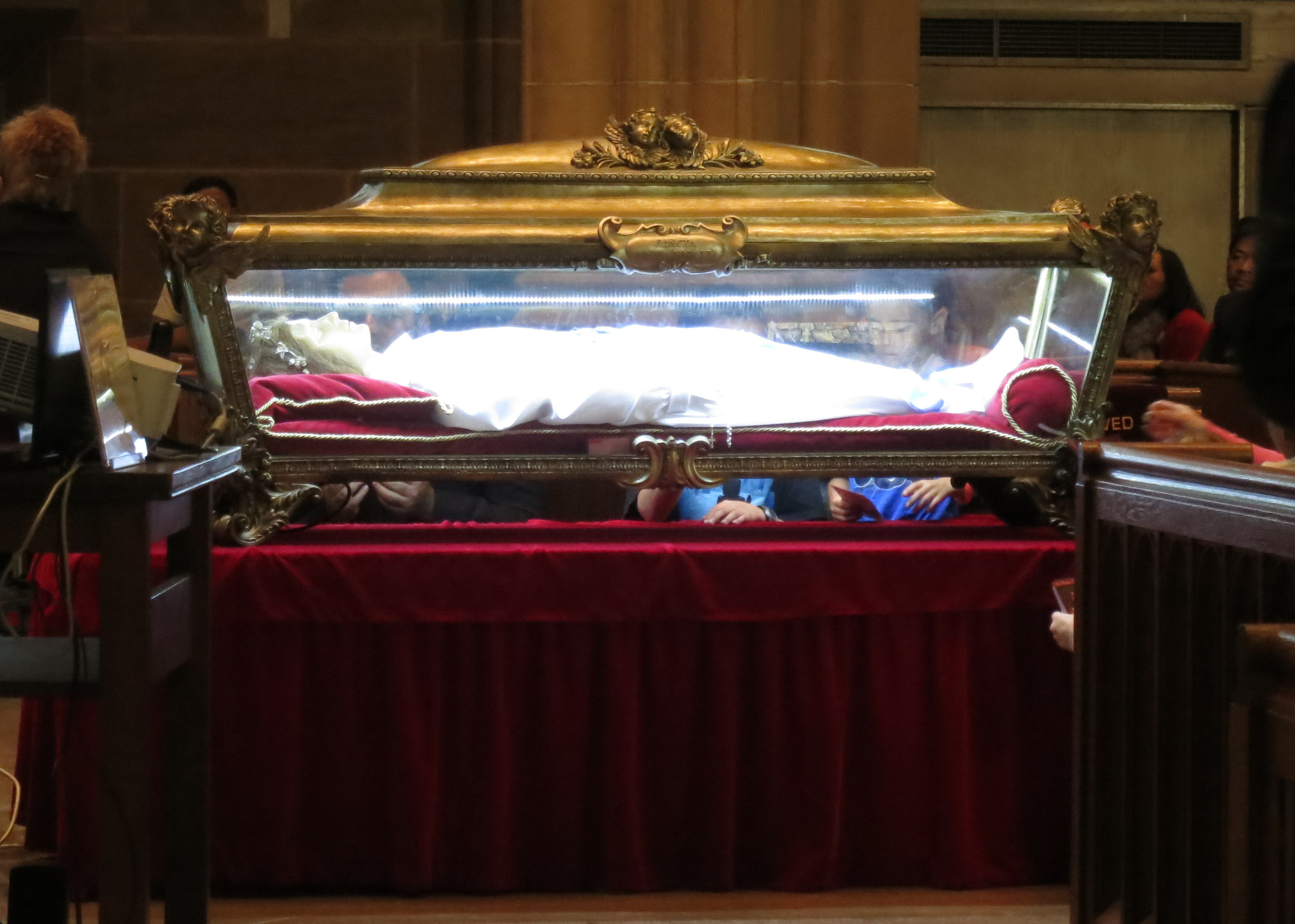
Maria's major relics on display at St. Joseph Cathedral (Columbus, Ohio)

Maria was beatified on 27 April 1947. In attendance at the ceremony were both Assunta and Pope Pius XII. On the evening of the ceremony in Saint Peter's Basilica, the Pope walked over to and greeted Assunta. She later reported, "When I saw the Pope coming, I prayed, 'Madonna, please help me', and I felt faint. He put his hand on my head and said, 'Blessed mother, happy mother, mother of a Blessed!'" Afterward, both could be seen with eyes wet with tears.

Three years later, on 24 June 1950, Pius XII canonized Maria as a saint, the "Saint Agnes of the 20th century." Assunta was again present at the ceremony, along with her four remaining sons and daughters. Despite what the popular press reported, Alessandro was not present for either the beatification or canonization. He and the friars decided, to avoid distracting from the ceremony, that it was best for him not to attend.

Owing to the huge crowd present, the ceremonies associated with the canonization were held outside Saint Peter's Basilica, in the Piazza San Pietro. Pius XII spoke, not as before in Latin, but in Italian. "We order and declare that the blessed Maria Goretti can be venerated as a Saint, and we introduce her into the Canon of Saints." Some 500,000 people, among them a majority of youth, had come from around the world. Pius asked them: "Young people, pleasure of the eyes of Jesus, are you determined to resist any attack on your chastity with the help of the grace of God?" A resounding "yes" was the answer.

Maria's three brothers would claim that she intervened miraculously in their lives. Angelo heard her voice telling him to emigrate to America. Alessandro was reportedly miraculously given a sum of money to finance his own emigration to join Angelo. Sandrino died in the United States in 1917, and Angelo died in Italy when he returned there in 1964. Mariano said he heard her voice telling him to stay in his trench when the rest of his unit partook in a charge against Austro-Hungarian soldiers in the Isonzo during World War I. He, the only survivor of that charge, lived until 1975 and had a large family.

Maria's remains are kept in the crypt of the Passionist Basilica of Nostra Signora delle Grazie e Santa Maria Goretti in Nettuno, south of Rome. It is often incorrectly reported that her body remained incorrupt after her death. This is because her skeletal remains are contained in a wax statue lying on its back inside a glass casket and the statue has been mistaken for her body.

== Feast day ==
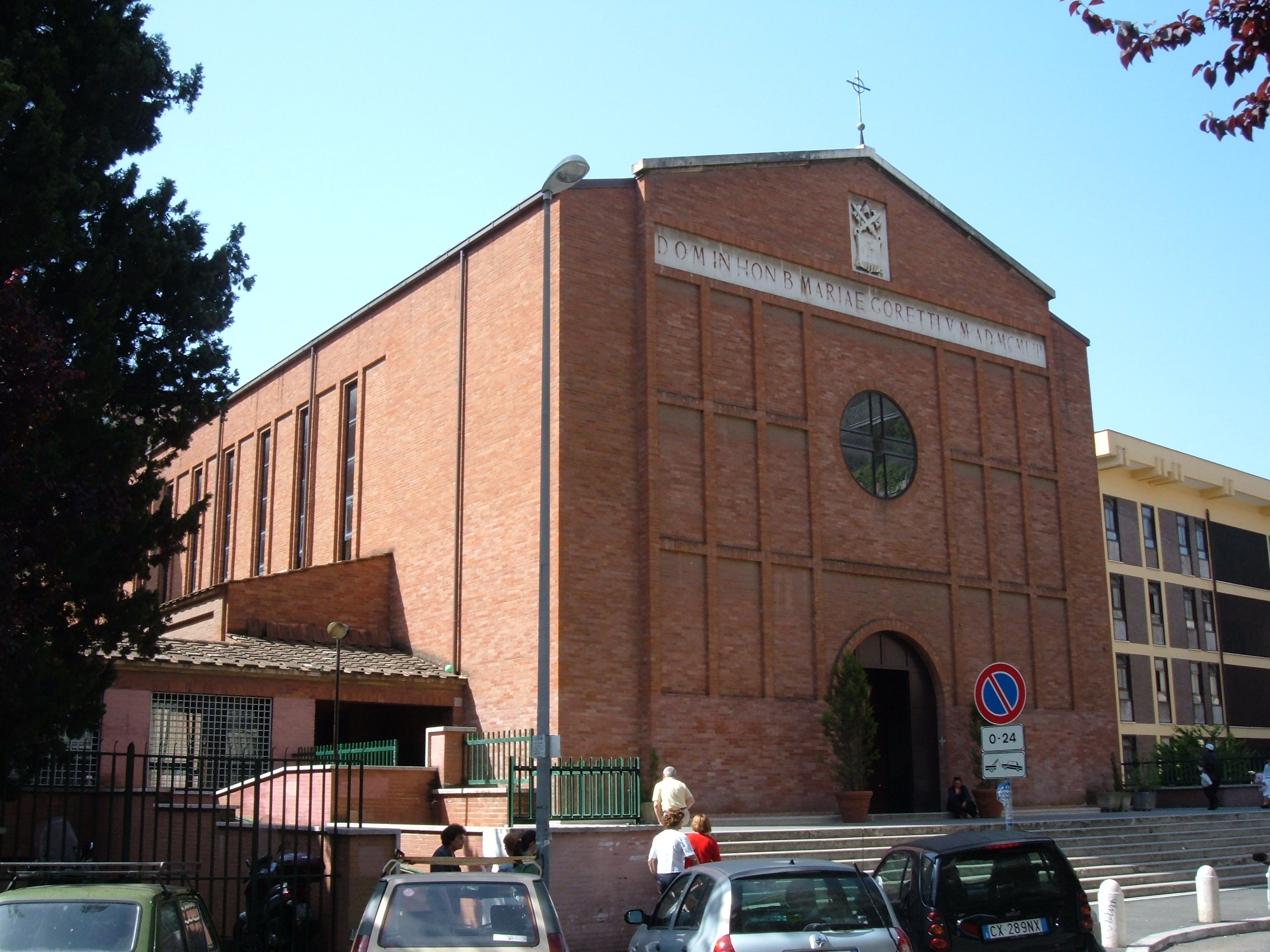
Church of Santa Maria Goretti, Rome

Maria's feast day, celebrated on 6 July, was inserted in the General Roman Calendar when it was revised in 1969. She is the patroness saint of chastity, rape victims, girls, youth, teenage girls, poverty, purity, and forgiveness.

== In art ==
Maria is represented in art as a wavy-haired young girl in farmer's clothes or a white dress, with a bouquet of lilies in her hands, and she is counted among the ranks of the Passionist order since her spiritual formation was guided by the Passionists who were also the postulators of her cause for sainthood. Both lilies and white garments are traditional icons of virginity in Catholic iconography.

There is a statue in front of St. Maria Goretti High School, located at 11th and Moore Streets in South Philadelphia. The statue was erected in 1955. The school, once all-girls, has since merged with local, all-boys high school, St. John Neumann. It is now co-ed and known as Neumann-Goretti High School.

== In media ==
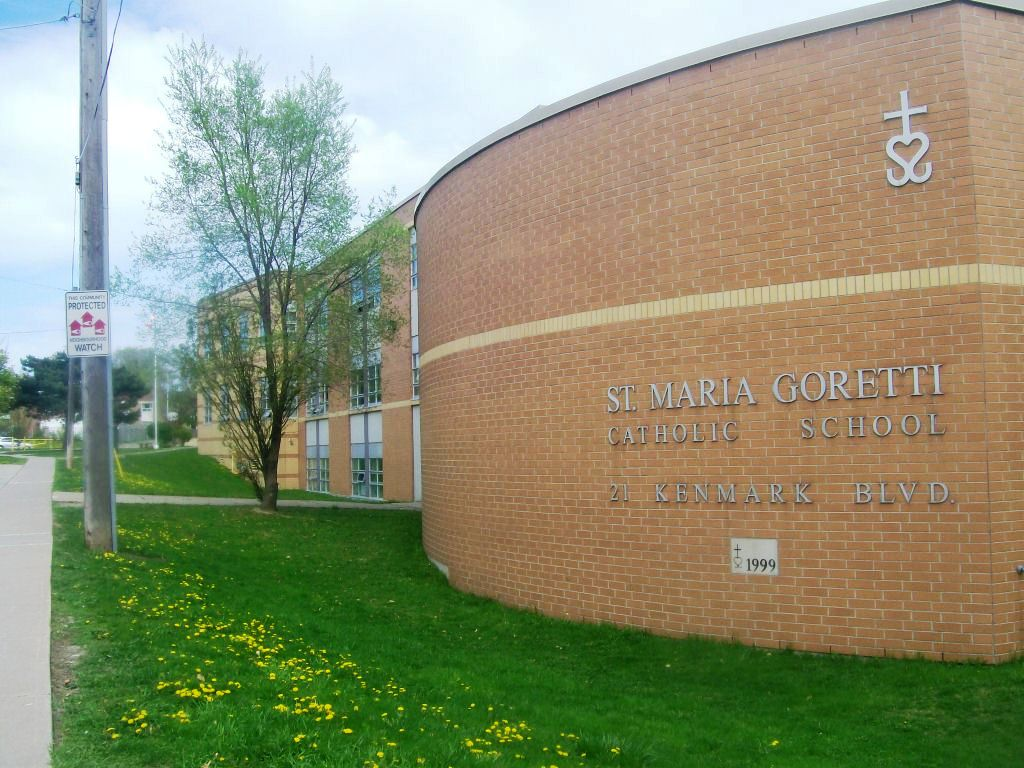
A large Catholic elementary school with over 1000 pupils in Toronto, Ontario, Canada, is named in her honor.

Heaven over the Marshes (Cielo sulla palude) is an Italian film based on Maria's life, filmed in 1949 and directed by Augusto Genina. Ines Orsini plays her, and Mauro Matteuci plays Alessandro. It was awarded a prize at the 10th International Exhibition of Cinema Art at Venice in 1949, as the one which contributed most to the spiritual and moral betterment of mankind.

Marcel Delannoy wrote a radiophonic opera, Maria Goretti, in 1953.

The subplot of the canonization of an 11-year-old girl in William Gaddis's 1955 novel The Recognitions was based on Maria's case.

In 2003, Maria Goretti, a RAI Italian TV movie directed by Giulio Base, starring Martina Pinto as Maria, was acclaimed by critics.

== See also ==
- List of Catholic saints
- Karolina Kózka, a Polish girl who has often been described as the "Polish Maria Goretti" after being killed in similar circumstances. She was beatified in 1987 by Pope John Paul II. She is not a Saint like Maria but she suffered similar circumstances to Maria.
