= Alessandro Serenelli =

Italian murderer (1882–1970)

Alessandro Serenelli OFM Cap.
- Born: 2 June 1882; Province of Ancona, Italy
- Died: 6 May 1970 (aged 87); Macerata, Italy
- Occupations: Farmhand, gardener, lay brother
- Known for: Murder of Maria Goretti

Alessandro Serenelli (2 June 1882 – 6 May 1970) was an Italian man, who is known for being the murderer of an eleven-year-old girl, Maria Goretti. He attempted to seduce and rape her and stabbed her 14 times, which mortally wounded her.

While serving 27 years in prison for his crime, he reported seeing a vision of his victim in which she repeated to him how she had forgiven him on her deathbed. From then, he was converted and became a model prisoner. Upon his release, he worked as a gardener, porter and lay brother in a convent of Franciscan Capuchin friars in the Marche until his death.

== Early life ==
Alessandro Serenelli was born into a peasant family in the Marche region. His father, Giovanni, is often portrayed as an alcoholic although Maria's mother said that he rarely drank to the point of drunkenness. His mother died in a psychiatric hospital when he was a few months old, apparently after she had tried to drown Serenelli when he was a newborn. A brother of the young man committed suicide while he was studying in the seminary. His father worked as a coachman and a laborer but was unable to keep any job for a long time and moved to Paliano to work as a métayage, or sharecropper.

Unlike many of his contemporaries, he attended school until the second grade and learned to read and write. Alessandro later worked as a longshoreman. At eighteen, his father called him to work with him in Paliano. There, he knew the Goretti family with whom he established a relationship of cooperation and neighbourliness.

== Crimes against Maria Goretti ==
In 1902, the twenty-year-old Serenelli, described by all as a very shy and quiet young man, began to harass Goretti, who was then eleven. In testimony given by him about his thoughts before the brutal incident, he related: "After the second attempt, in my mind was formed more than ever the intention to succeed in the vent of my passion and I conceived the idea to kill her if she continued to resist my cravings".

On 5 July 1902, Serenelli returned to the house and threatened Maria with death if she did not do as he said; he was intending to rape her. However, she would not submit, protested that what he wanted to do was a mortal sin, and warned him that he would go to hell. She desperately fought to stop him from proceeding. She kept screaming, "No! It is a sin! God does not want it!" He first choked her, but when she insisted that she would rather die than submit to him, he stabbed her eleven times. She tried to reach for the door, but he stopped her by stabbing her three more times before he fled the scene.

The psychiatric evaluation made during the process determined him to be mentally sane and therefore liable for his actions, but it also acknowledged that his unfortunate youth, including multiple cases of mental disorders and alcoholism within his family, to some extent attenuated his responsibility.

== Imprisonment and redemption ==
After due process, Serenelli was sentenced to 30 years in prison. He avoided life imprisonment because Italian law at the time set the age of majority at 21 and so he was not yet of age to be subject to that penalty. He was released from prison in 1929, after he had served 27 years. Of the 30 to which he had been sentenced, one year was remitted by the general pardon to all prisoners after the Italian victory in World War I, and a further two years was remitted for good behaviour.

On the night of Christmas 1934, Serenelli begged forgiveness on his knees from Assunta Goretti, Maria's mother. She forgave him and said that she could not refuse since Maria had already done so on her deathbed.

Having worked sporadically as a farmer and laborer, Serenelli eventually retired to a monastery of the Order of Friars Minor Capuchin, where he served as a gardener and porter and eventually was accepted as a religious brother.

On 24 June 1950, Pope Pius XII canonized Goretti as a saint, the "Saint Agnes of the 20th century." Assunta was present at the ceremony, along with Maria's four remaining siblings. She was the first mother ever to attend the canonisation ceremony of one of her children.

It has often been reported that Serenelli was present at both Goretti's beatification and canonization, but these reports are false. Serenelli and the Capuchin friars he was living with debated the matter amongst themselves. They feared that if Serenelli were to go to the beatification then his presence might inadvertently diminish and belittle the celebration of the life of Goretti. None the less it was decided at first that Serenelli would make the trip, however he would go incognito and under a false name, and wear a friar's religious habit. In addition, a friar would travel with him to guide him and help him maintain his cover. Despite these efforts, the friar who was to travel with him died unexpectedly. Serenelli and the friars took this as God's providence and decided not to have Serenelli attend, but instead listen to it on the radio. For similar reasons, Serenelli likewise never attended the later canonization.

== Death and legacy ==
Serenelli died on 6 May 1970 (eve of the Feast of the Ascension), 27 days before his 88th birthday, in a convent at Macerata from complications relating to a fracture of his femur after a fall. Around a decade earlier, he had written the following as part of his will:

I am nearly 80 years old. I am about to die.

Looking back at my past, I can see that in my early youth, I chose a bad path which led me to ruin myself.

My behavior was influenced by print, mass media and bad examples which are followed by the majority of young people without even thinking. And I did the same. I was not worried.

There were a lot of generous and devoted people who surrounded me, but I paid no attention to them because a violent force blinded me and pushed me toward a wrong way of life.

When I was 20 years old, I committed a crime of passion. Now, that memory represents something horrible for me. Maria Goretti, now a Saint, was my good Angel, sent to me by Providence to guide and save me. I still have impressed upon my heart her words of rebuke and of pardon. She prayed for me, she interceded for her murderer. Thirty years of prison followed.

If I had been of age, I would have spent all my life in prison. I accepted to be condemned because it was my own fault.

Little Maria was really my light, my protectress; with her help, I behaved well during the 27 years of prison and tried to live honestly when I was again accepted among the members of society. The Brothers of St. Francis, Capuchins from the Marche, welcomed me with angelic charity into their monastery as a brother, not as a servant. I have been living with their community for 24 years, and now I am serenely waiting to witness the vision of God, to hug my loved ones again, and to be next to my Guardian Angel and her dear mother, Assunta.

I hope this letter that I have written can teach others the happy lesson of avoiding evil and of always following the right path, like little children. I feel that religion with its precepts is not something we can live without, but rather it is the real comfort, the real strength in life and the only safe way in every circumstance, even the most painful ones of life.

Alessandro Serenelli, May 5, 1961

== Sources ==
- Giovanni Alberti, Maria Goretti, New City Publishing, 1980. ISBN 8883861507.
- Giordano Bruno Guerri, Povera santa, povero assassino: la vera storia di Maria Goretti [Poor Saint, Poor Murderer. The True Story of Maria Goretti], Mondadori, Milan, 1985 [in Italian]. Updated edition, Bompiani, Milan, 2008.
