= Santa Maria Goretti, Rome =

Santa Maria Goretti
- Church of Saint Maria Goretti
- Chiesa di Santa Maria Goretti
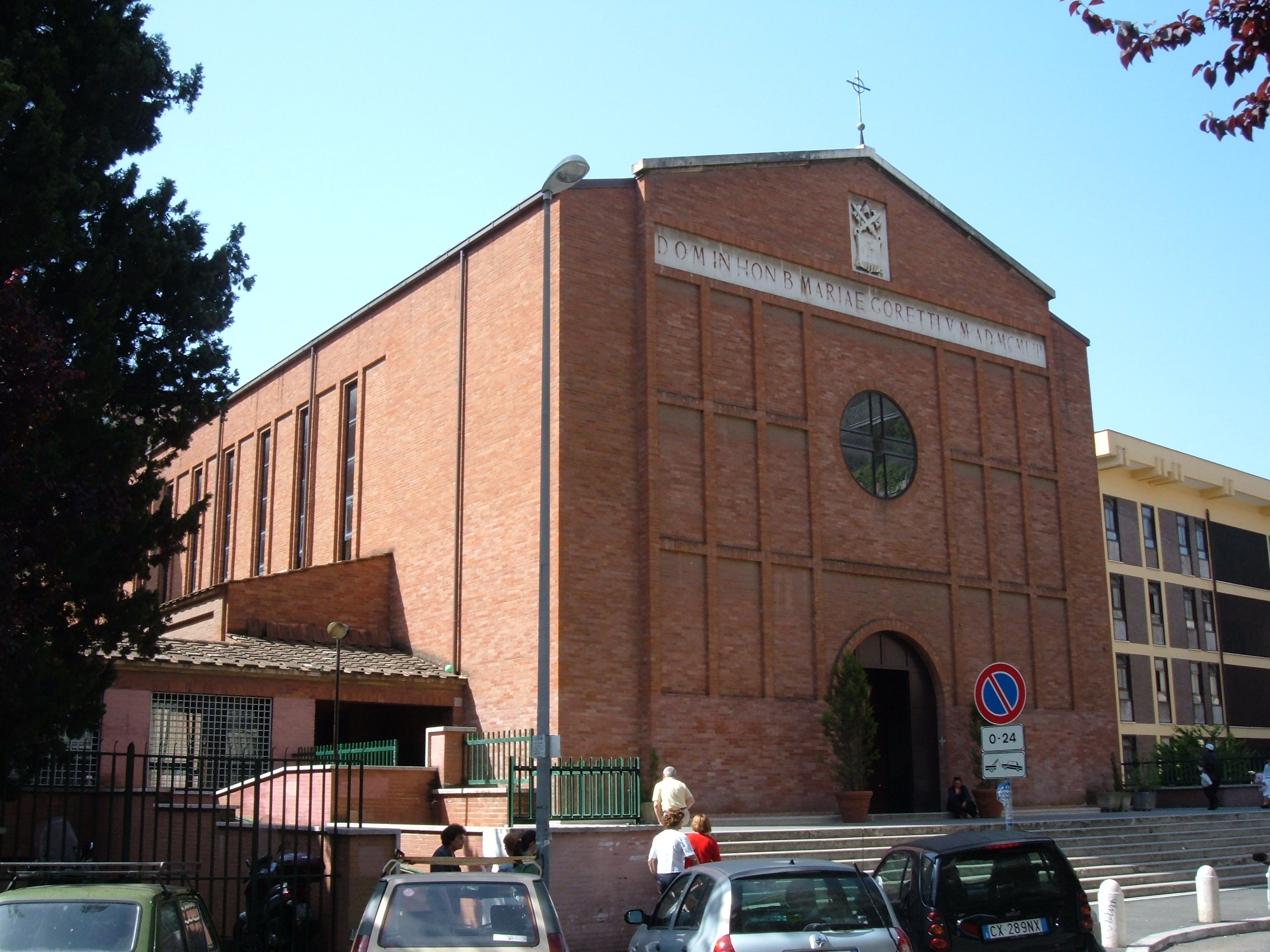

- Location within Rome
- 41°55′53″N 12°31′17″E
- Location: Via di Santa Maria Goretti 29, Q. Trieste, Rome
- Country: Italy
- Language: Italian
- Denomination: Catholic
- Tradition: Roman Rite
- Website: santamariagorettiroma.org

History
- Status: titular church, parish church
- Dedication: Maria Goretti
- Consecrated: 15 May 1954

Architecture
- Functional status: active
- Architect: Tullio Rossi
- Architectural type: Romanesque Revival
- Groundbreaking: 1953
- Completed: 1954

Administration
- Diocese: Rome

Santa Maria Goretti is a 20th-century parochial church and titular church in the northern suburbs of Rome, dedicated to Saint Maria Goretti.

== History ==
Santa Maria Goretti was built in 1953–54. It is in basilica form and built in red brick, with the arms of Pope Pius XII displayed on the facade. The floor is in dark green gritstone and green-gray Cipollino marble. Pope John XXIII visited the church in 1961.

On 18 February 2012, it was made a titular church to be held by a cardinal-deacon.

Cardinal-Protectors

- Prosper Grech (2012–2019)
- Agostino Marchetto (2023–)
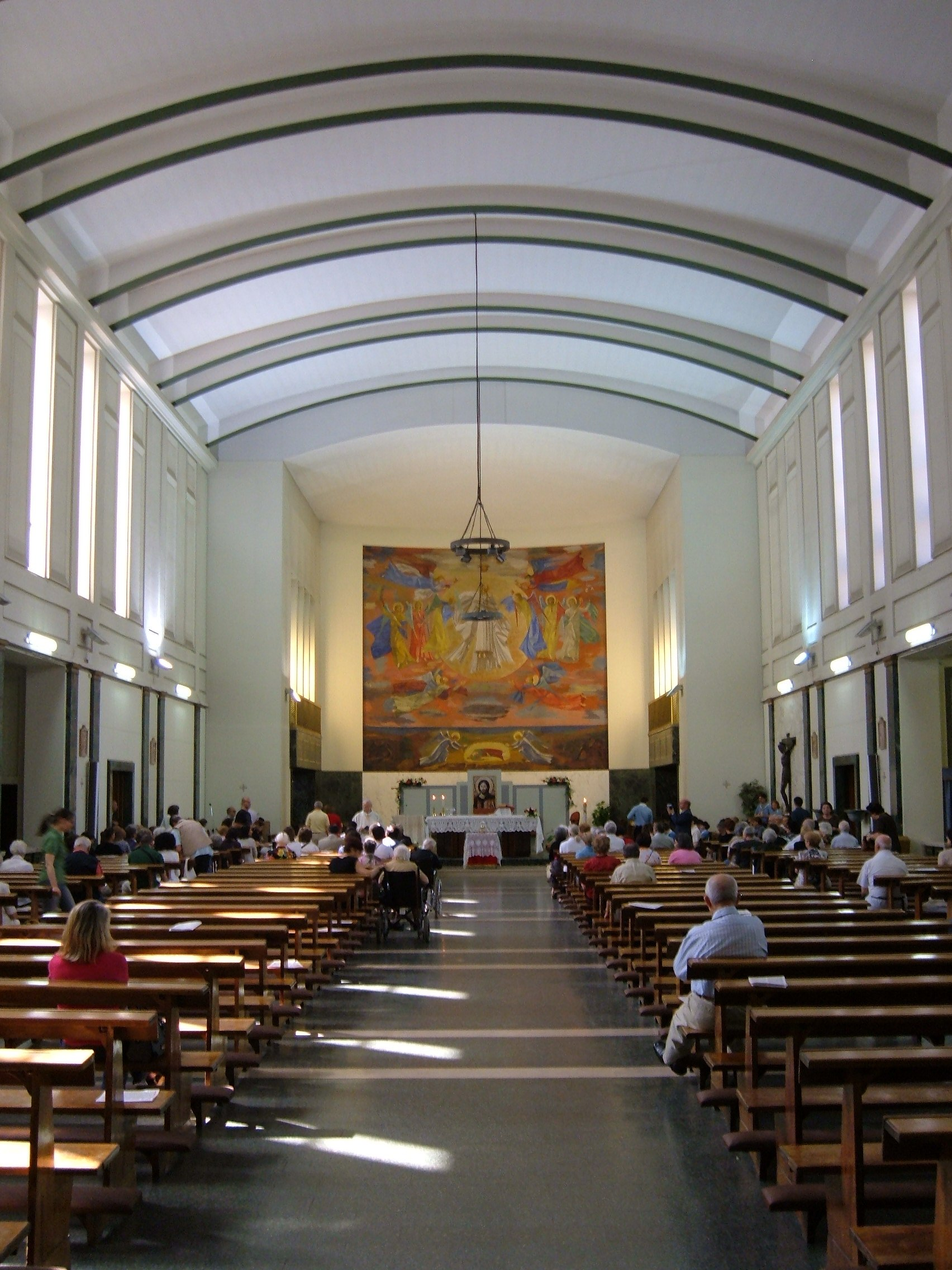
Interior view; the fresco behind the altar is by Luigi Montanarini.
