= Joseph John Gerry =

American Benedictine monk and prelate (1928–2023)

His Excellency, The Most Reverend Joseph John Gerry O.S.B
- Bishop of Portland; Abbot of Saint Anselm Abbey
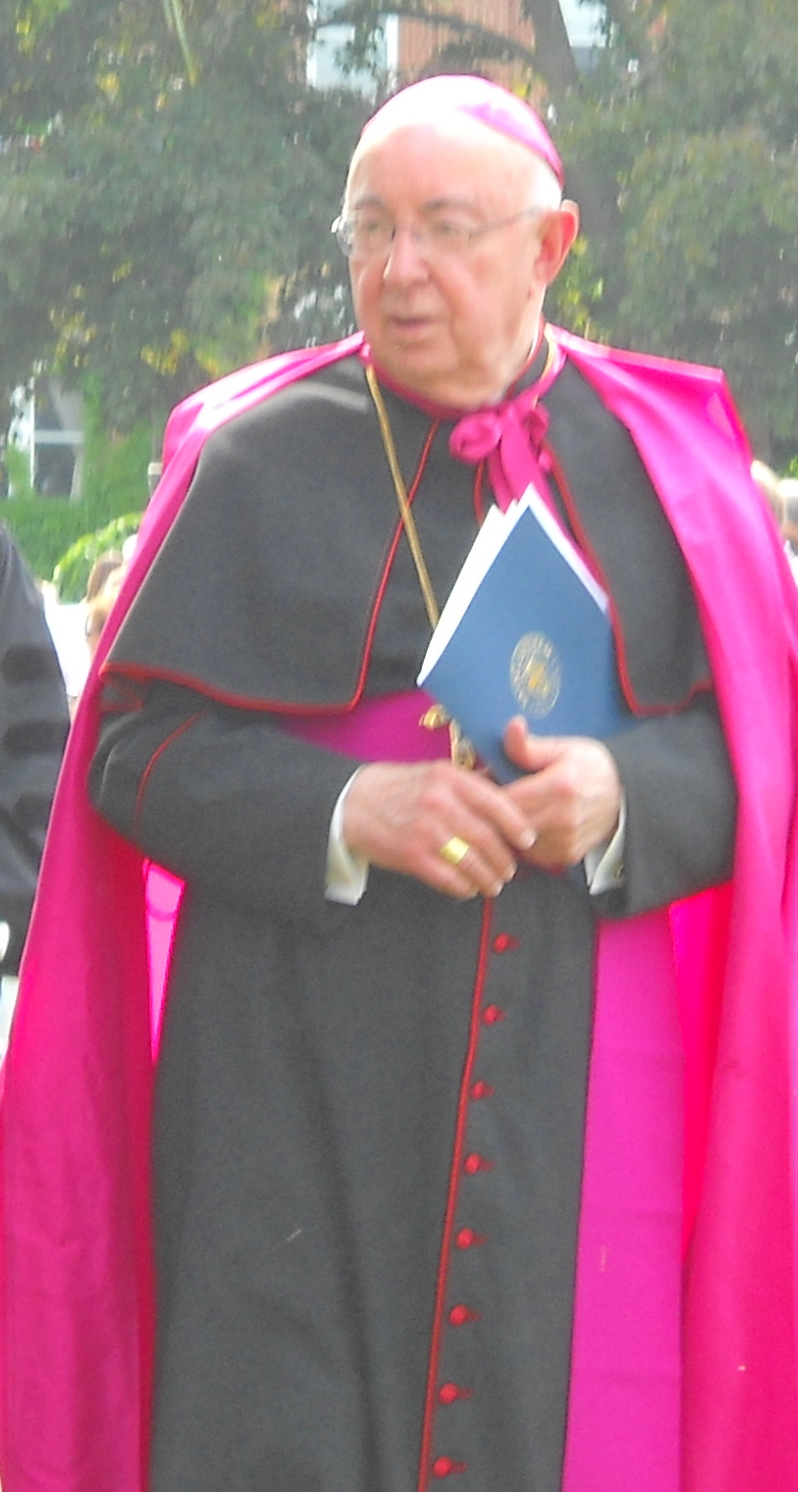
- Gerry in 2010
- Church: Catholic Church
- Diocese: Portland
- Appointed: December 21, 1988
- Installed: February 21, 1989
- Retired: February 10, 2004
- Predecessor: Edward Cornelius O'Leary
- Successor: Richard Joseph Malone
- Previous posts: Auxiliary Bishop of Manchester and Titular Bishop of Praecausa (1986 to 1988); Prior, St. Anselm Abbey (1963 to 1986)

Orders
- Ordination: June 12, 1954 by Matthew Francis Brady
- Consecration: April 21, 1986 by Odore Joseph Gendron, Ernest John Primeau, and Robert Edward Mulvee

Personal details
- Born: September 12, 1928 Millinocket, Maine, U.S.
- Died: July 2, 2023 (aged 94) Manchester, New Hampshire, U.S.
- Motto: Magis prodesse quam praeesse (To benefit rather than to rule)

Styles of Joseph John Gerry
- Reference style: His Excellency; The Most Reverend
- Spoken style: Your Excellency
- Religious style: Bishop

Joseph John Gerry, O.S.B., (September 12, 1928 – July 2, 2023) was an American Benedictine monk and prelate of the Catholic Church.

Gerry served as the third abbot of Saint Anselm Abbey until he was appointed an auxiliary bishop of the Diocese of Manchester in New Hampshire in 1986. He then served as bishop of the Diocese of Portland in Maine from 1989 to 2004.

== Early life ==
Joseph Gerry was born in Millinocket, Maine, on September 12, 1928. In 1945, he graduated from George W. Stearns High School in Millinocket. Gerry then entered Saint Anselm College in Goffstown, New Hampshire. Gerry obtained his novitiate at St. Vincent Archabbey in Latrobe, Pennsylvania. On July 2, 1948, Gerry made his profession of religious vows as a monk at St. Anselm Abbey in New Hampshire. In 1959, Gerry graduated with a Bachelor of Arts degree from Saint Anselm College. He then returned to the abbey to complete four more years of theological studies.

== Priestly ministry ==
On June 12, 1954, Gerry was ordained to the priesthood by Bishop Matthew Brady at St. Joseph's Cathedral in Manchester, New Hampshire. In 1955, Gerry earned a Master of Philosophy degree from the University of Toronto.

From 1958 to 1986, Gerry was a professor of philosophy and humanities at Saint Anselm College. In 1959, he received a Doctor of Philosophy degree from Fordham University in New York City. That same year, Gerry was appointed subprior of St. Anselm Abbey. He was appointed prior in 1963 and on January 6, 1972 was elected abbot. At Saint Anselm College, Gerry also served as academic dean (1971–1972) and chancellor (1972–1986).

== Episcopal ministry ==
=== Auxiliary Bishop of Manchester ===
On February 4, 1986, Pope John Paul II appointed Gerry as an auxiliary bishop of the Diocese of Manchester and titular bishop of Praecausa. He received his episcopal consecration at St. Joseph Cathedral on April 21, 1986 from Bishop Odore Gendron, with Bishops Ernest Primeau and Robert Mulvee serving as co-consecrators. In February 1988, Gerry was elected chairman of the Committee on Ecumenical and Interreligious Affairs in the National Conference of Catholic Bishops.

=== Bishop of Portland ===
On December 27, 1988, John Paul II named Gerry as the tenth bishop of Portland. Gerry was installed at the Cathedral of the Immaculate Conception in Portland, Maine, on February 21, 1989. In February 1989, Gerry published his book, Ever Present Lord.

During his 15-year-long tenure, Gerry published a pastoral letter approximately once a year, treating such topics as vocations to the ministry, the sacrament of confirmation, and human sexuality. He consolidated Maine parishes in Old Town, Lisbon, and Waterville. Gerry publicly opposed partial-birth abortion and physician-assisted suicide in state referendums in 1999 and 2000 respectively. Gerry opened St. Dominic Regional High School in Auburn, Maine, in 2002.

Gerry was also very engaged in interfaith dialogue with Buddhists, Hindus and Muslims. He was active in the DIMMID, was appointed member of the Pontifical Council for Interreligious Dialogue and participated in the first Gethsemani Encounter in 1996 together with the Dalai Lama.

On March 9, 2002, Gerry removed two priests from ministry in the diocese. The two men, Reverend Michael Doucette and Reverend John Audibert, had admitted to sexually abusing different boys during the 1980s. Gerry said that the men would not be transferred to other parishes. On February 4, 2004, Gerry advised the Maine Legislature not to legalize same sex marriage, calling it a violation of "natural law".

== Retirement ==
On reaching the mandatory retirement age of 75, Gerry submitted his letter of resignation as bishop of Portland to John Paul II in September 2003. His resignation was accepted on February 10, 2004, and he was succeeded by Bishop Joseph Malone.

Gerry then retired to Saint Anselm Abbey. After returning to the Abbey he briefly served as novice master for the community, supervising and guiding the novice monks in their formation.Gerry died at a care home in Manchester on July 2, 2023, at the age of 94.

Catholic Church titles
Preceded by Edward Cornelius O'Leary	Bishop of Portland; 1989–2004	Succeeded by Richard Joseph Malone
Preceded by —	Auxiliary Bishop of Manchester; 1986–1988	Succeeded by —
Preceded by Rosalio José Castillo Lara	Titular Bishop of Praecausa; 1986–1988	Succeeded by Józef Wysocki
