= Francis Joseph Christian =

Catholic bishop

His Excellency, The Most Reverend Francis Joseph Christian
- Auxiliary Bishop Emeritus of Manchester; Titular Bishop of Quincy
- Archdiocese: Boston
- Diocese: Manchester
- Appointed: April 2, 1996
- Installed: May 14, 1996
- Retired: February 1, 2018
- Other post: Titular Bishop of Quincy

Orders
- Ordination: June 29, 1968
- Consecration: May 14, 1996 by Leo Edward O'Neil, Odore Joseph Gendron, and Joseph John Gerry

Personal details
- Born: Peterborough, New Hampshire, US
- Education: Saint Paul Seminary - Bachelor of Arts degree University of Ottawa - Bachelor of Philosophy degree American College at the University of Louvain - Master of Theology and Doctor of Theology degrees
- Motto: To love in deed and truth

Styles of Francis Joseph Christian
- Reference style: His Excellency; The Most Reverend
- Spoken style: Your Excellency
- Religious style: Bishop

Francis Joseph Christian (born 1942) is an American prelate of the Roman Catholic Church who served as an auxiliary bishop of the Diocese of Manchester in New Hampshire from 1996 to 2018.

== Biography ==
=== Early life ===
Francis Christian was born on October 8, 1942, in Peterborough, New Hampshire. He attended primary school in the Jaffrey-Rindge Cooperative School District, graduating from Conant High School in Jaffrey, New Hampshire.

Christian studied at Saint Anselm College in Goffstown, New Hampshire, for two years before entering Saint Paul Seminary in Ottawa, Ontario, in 1962. In 1964, he graduated from Saint Paul with a Bachelor of Arts degree. He received a Bachelor of Philosophy degree from the University of Ottawa in 1964. That same year, Christian travelled to Leuven, Belgium, to attend the American College at the University of Louvain, earning a Master of Theology degree in 1968.

=== Priesthood ===
On June 28, 1968, Christian was ordained into the priesthood for the Diocese of Manchester by Bishop Ernest Primeau at Saint Patrick Church in Jaffrey.

After his ordination, Christian served three years as parochial vicar at Our Lady of Mercy Parish in Merrimack, New Hampshire, then a year with the same position at Saint Joseph Cathedral Parish. In 1973, Christian returned to the American College, earning a Doctor of Theology degree in February 1975.

In March 1975, Christian came back to Manchester to serve as assistant chancellor of Manchester. He was promoted to chancellor in June 1977. In 1986, Pope John Paul II named Christian a prelate of honor.

=== Auxiliary Bishop of Manchester ===
On April 2, 1996, Pope John Paul II appointed Christian as the auxiliary bishop of Manchester and titular bishop of Quincy. He was consecrated by Bishop Leo O’Neil on May 14, 1996, at the Cathedral of Saint Joseph in Manchester.In 2003, Christian was appointed pastor of St. Joseph the Worker Parish in Nashua, New Hampshire in addition to his duties as auxiliary bishop.

== Retirement ==
On February 1, 2018, Pope Francis accepted Christian's letter of resignation as auxiliary bishop of Manchester. He continued to serve as pastor of St. Joseph the Worker Parish.

== See also ==
- Catholic Church hierarchy
- Catholic Church in the United States
- Historical list of the Catholic bishops of the United States
- List of Catholic bishops of the United States
- Lists of patriarchs, archbishops, and bishops

== Episcopal succession ==
Catholic Church titles
Preceded by –	Auxiliary Bishop of Manchester; 1996–2018	Succeeded by –
