= Saint Anselm Abbey (New Hampshire) =

American Benedictine monastery in New Hampshire

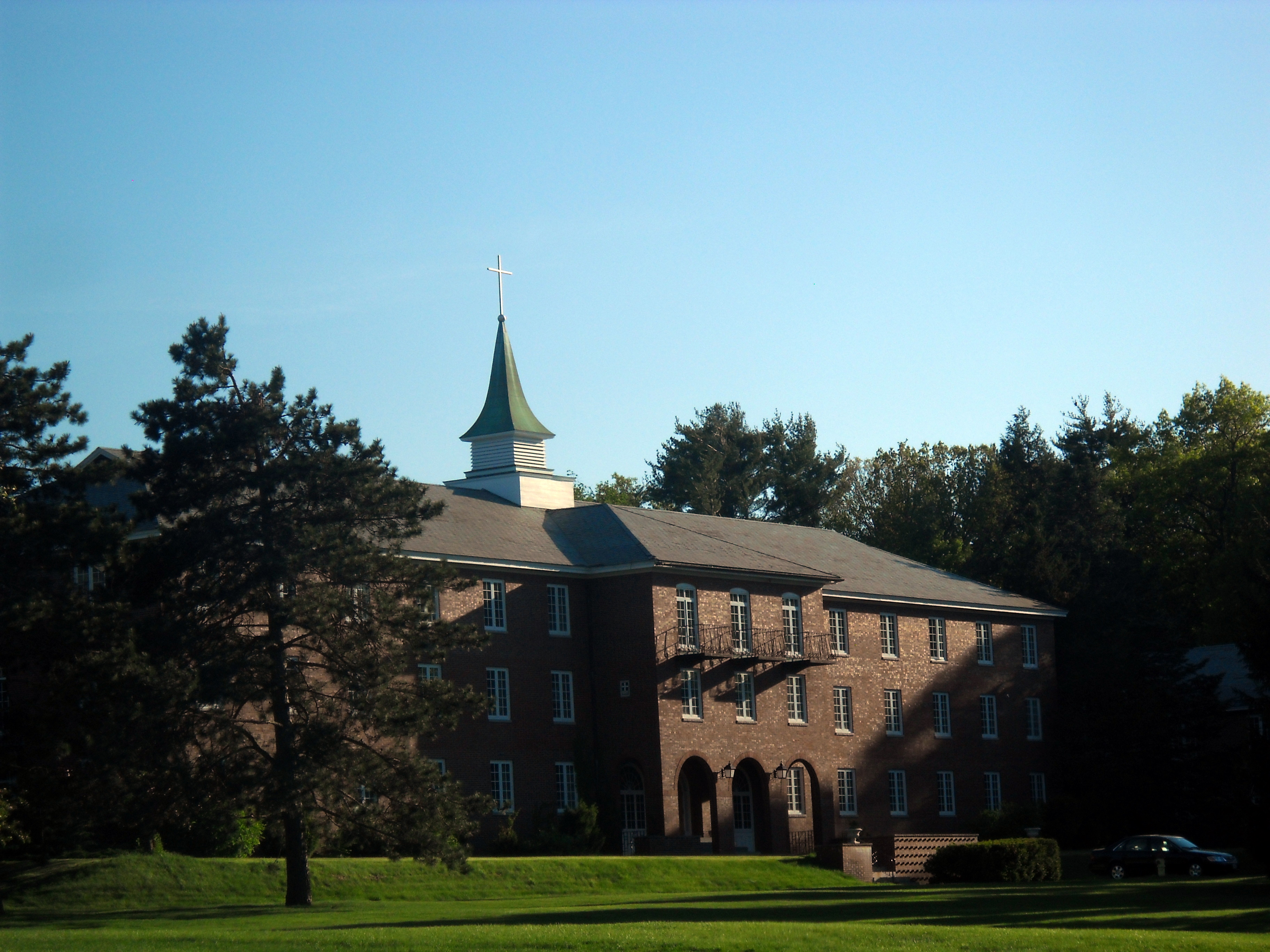
- North facade of Saint Anselm Abbey

- Location within New Hampshire Location within the United States

Monastery information
- Order: Benedictines
- Established: 1889
- Mother house: St. Mary's Abbey
- Dedication: Saint Anselm of Canterbury
- Diocese: Diocese of Manchester

People
- Abbot: The Right Rev. Brother Isaac Murphy, O.S.B.
- Prior: Very Reverend Augustine Kelly, O.S.B.

Site
- Location: 100 Saint Anselm Drive, Manchester, New Hampshire
- Country: United States
- Coordinates: 42°59′11″N 71°30′32″W
- Other information: Motto: Latin Initium Sapientiae Timor Domini ("The Fear of the Lord is the Beginning of Wisdom") (Psalm 111:10)
- Website: www.saintanselmabbey.org

Saint Anselm Abbey, located in Goffstown, New Hampshire, United States, is a Benedictine abbey composed of men living under the Rule of Saint Benedict within the Catholic Church. The abbey was founded in 1889 under the patronage of Saint Anselm of Canterbury, a Benedictine monk of Bec and former archbishop of Canterbury in England. The monks are involved in the operation of Saint Anselm College. The abbey is a member of the American-Cassinese Congregation of the Benedictine Confederation.

On June 17, 2024, the monastic community elected Isaac Murphy as their sixth abbot. This was an historic election as Murphy is a religious brother, not a priest. His is the first such election in the world, made possible only by a decree of the Holy See issued in 2022 which permitted non-ordained brothers to head religious communities that include priests.

== Foundation ==
In 1889, Denis M. Bradley, the first bishop of Manchester, New Hampshire, requested that Abbot Boniface Wimmer send monks to his diocese to create a school for French and Irish immigrants. The bishop thought that in order to create harmony among the people of his diocese the best educators for them should be German. Monks from Saint Mary's Abbey in Newark, New Jersey, were sent to found Saint Anselm Abbey in 1889. When they arrived they founded St. Raphael's Parish in Manchester, and they founded Saint Anselm Preparatory School, which would later evolve into Saint Anselm College.

== Buildings ==
The present main abbey building was completed in 1955 to designs by Manchester architects Koehler & Isaak in the Colonial Revival style. The same architects added the adjacent abbey church in 1965 and designed much of the college campus.

== Saint Anselm College ==
Saint Anselm College is a Catholic liberal arts college in Goffstown, New Hampshire. The monks of Saint Anselm Abbey are involved in the life and operation of the college. Serving as administrators, as faculty and staff members, and on the college's Board of Trustees, the monastery's approximately 30 monks work in the university.

== Abbots ==
From the time of its founding in 1889 until 1927, when it became an independent abbey, Saint Anselm was a dependent priory of Saint Mary's Abbey in Newark, New Jersey. The abbots of Saint Mary's were also the spiritual superiors of Saint Anselm. Those abbots were Abbot Hilary Pfraengle and Abbot Ernest Helmstetter.

Since its elevation to the status of an independent institution, Saint Anselm has been led by six men:

1. Bertrand Dolan, O.S.B. - In 1927, Saint Anselm Priory was elevated to an abbey by Pope Pius XI. Abbot President Ernest Helmstetter, president of the American-Cassinese Congregation, conducted the first abbatial election, and the monks in solemn vows elected Fr. Bertrand Dolan, O.S.B. as first abbot of Saint Anselm Abbey.
2. Gerald McCarthy, O.S.B. - Abbot Gerald was elected coadjutor abbot in 1963 at Abbot Bertrand's request. Following the death of Abbot Bertrand in 1968, Abbot Gerald became the Abbot of Saint Anselm. His abbatial blessing was celebrated on September 3, 1963, by Bishop Ernest John Primeau of Manchester. Abbot Gerald retired from his abbatial duties due to declining health shortly before Christmas of 1971.
3. Joseph John Gerry, O.S.B. - Bishop Joseph professed first vows as a member of Saint Anselm Abbey on July 2, 1948, following his novitiate at Saint Vincent Archabbey in Latrobe, Pennsylvania. He was ordained to the priesthood in St. Joseph's Cathedral, Manchester, by Bishop Matthew Francis Brady on June 12, 1954. He was named Subprior of the Abbey in 1959 and Prior in 1963, a position he held until 1971. On January 6, 1972, he was elected third abbot of Saint Anselm Abbey, a position he held until his appointment as Auxiliary Bishop of Manchester by Pope John Paul II. On February 21, 1989 he was installed as the 10th Bishop of Portland, Maine. The principal celebrant was Bernard Cardinal Law, Archbishop of Boston. The event took place at the Cathedral of the Immaculate Conception in Portland. Bishop Joseph retired on February 4, 2004, and returned to Saint Anselm Abbey where he currently resides.
4. Matthew K. Leavy, O.S.B. - Abbot Matthew, a native of the Bronx, New York, took vows as a monk in 1968. Ordained to the priesthood in 1975, and having held various responsibilities in the monastery and at Saint Anselm College, he was elected the fourth Abbot of Saint Anselm Abbey on March 4, 1986, at the age of 35, after Abbot Joseph John Gerry's elevation to Auxiliary Bishop of Manchester. Before being elected Abbot, he was the Prior of the Abbey. Abbot Matthew retired from his position as Abbot and Chancellor of Saint Anselm College on June 5, 2012.
5. Mark Cooper, O.S.B. - On June 5, 2012, Abbot Mark Cooper was elected as the fifth Abbot of Saint Anselm Abbey. By virtue of his election, he consequently becomes Chancellor of Saint Anselm College. Previous to his election he managed Saint Anselm College's finances for 33 years and was set to retire as the treasurer and vice president of financial affairs. Abbot Mark professed vows as a member of the Benedictine community at Saint Anselm in 1972 and was ordained to the priesthood in 1976. He earned his bachelor's degree in political science in 1971 from Saint Anselm College. He earned an M.S.A. in business administration from the University of Notre Dame. He studied at Saint John's Seminary in Boston and St. Albert's Seminary in Oakland, California. He taught at Woodside Priory in California and received an Alumni Award of Merit in 2003 for his contributions to the growth of Saint Anselm College. Abbot Mark was officially blessed as the Abbot of Saint Anselm Abbey on September 10, 2012 by his uncle Bishop Joseph Gerry, O.S.B. in the presence of the Bishop of Manchester, Peter Libasci.
6. Isaac Shannon Murphy, O.S.B. - On April 29 and 30, 2024, the monks of Saint Anselm Abbey gathered to elect their new spiritual leader following Abbot Mark's retirement. They selected Brother Isaac Murphy but because Brother Isaac was not already ordained as a Catholic priest, his postulation had to be confirmed by the Holy See, specifically the Dicastery for Institutes of Consecrated Life and Societies of Apostolic Life. Following notice of the approval of his case, Brother Isaac's election as Abbot was confirmed on June 17, 2024. Before his election, Brother Isaac had served within the monastic community as Prior (2005-2013). A native of Sherbrooke, Québec, he is a graduate of Saint Francis Xavier University in Antigonish, Nova Scotia. He received his Ph.D. in Political Science from the University of Chicago and has taught courses as an instructor at Saint Anselm College in the Department of Politics. In 2013 he was named as the Vice President for Academic Affairs and was later appointed as the Executive Vice President of the College. His abbatial blessing was held at Saint Anselm Abbey Church on September 27, 2024.

== Congregation song ==
On feast days and at the graveside during burial of members of the community, the monastic community sings the hymn of the American-Cassinese Congregation known as the "Ultima". The hymn is sung a cappella in Latin through once, then the final two lines are repeated.

Latin Text	English text	German text
Ultima in mortis hora, Filium pro nobis ora, Bonam mortem impetra, Virgo, Mater, Domina.	When death's hour is then upon us, To your Son pray that he grant us, Death, both holy and serene, Virgin Mary, Mother, Queen.	Wenn wir mit dem Tode ringen, Wollst, Maria, uns beispringen, Dass wir selig scheiden hin, Jungfrau, Mutter, Königin.

== Gallery ==
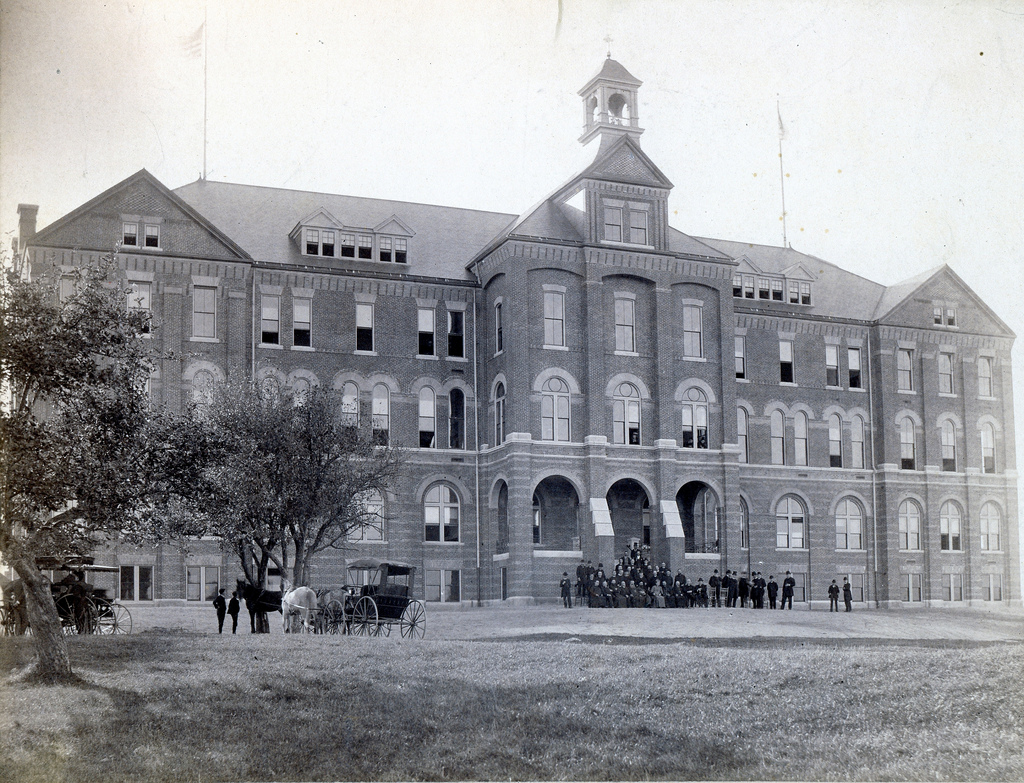
College Dedication, October 11, 1893

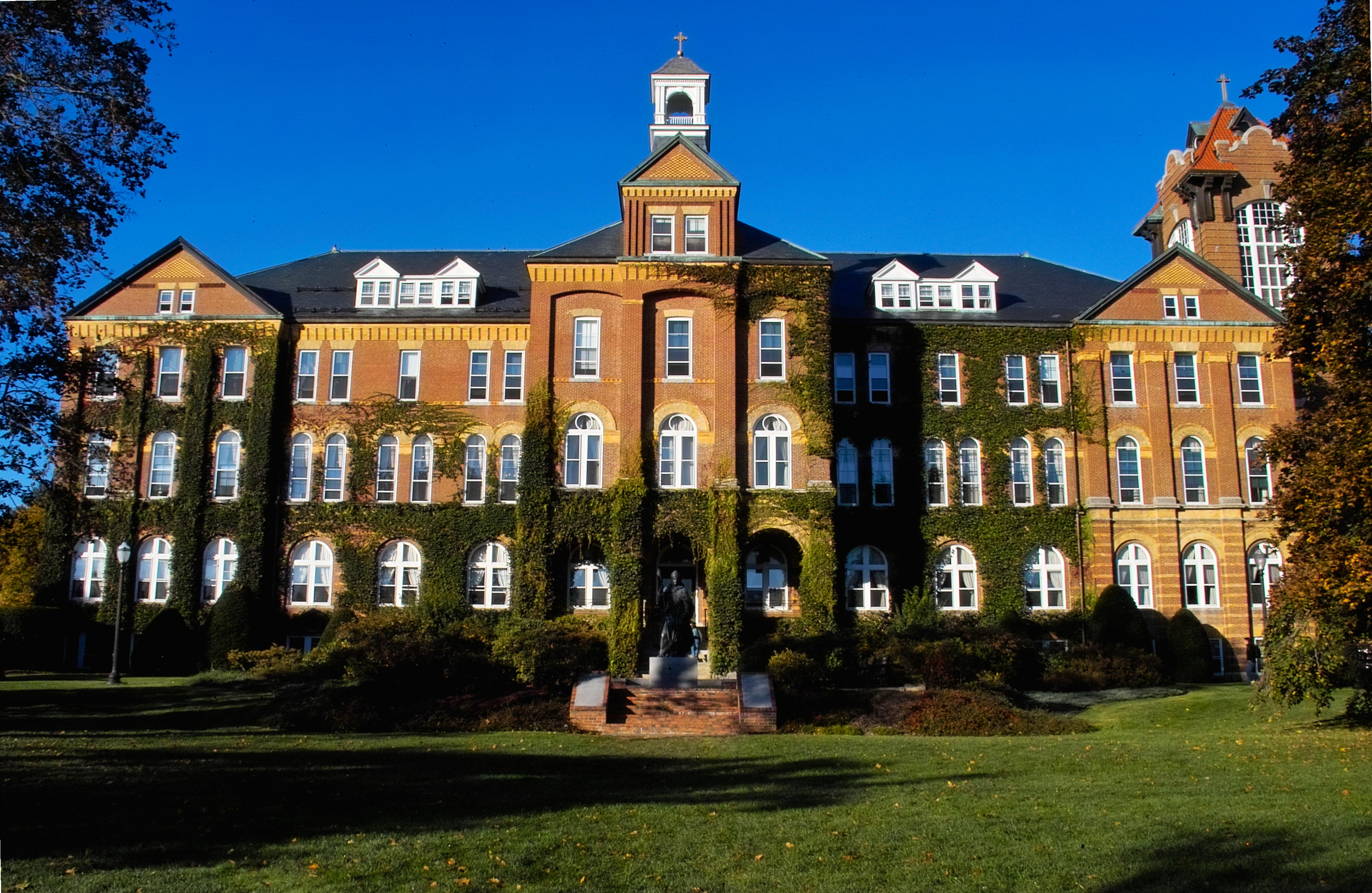
Saint Anselm College's Alumni Hall, rebuilt in 1893 after a devastating fire, was the first monastery complex for Saint Anselm Abbey

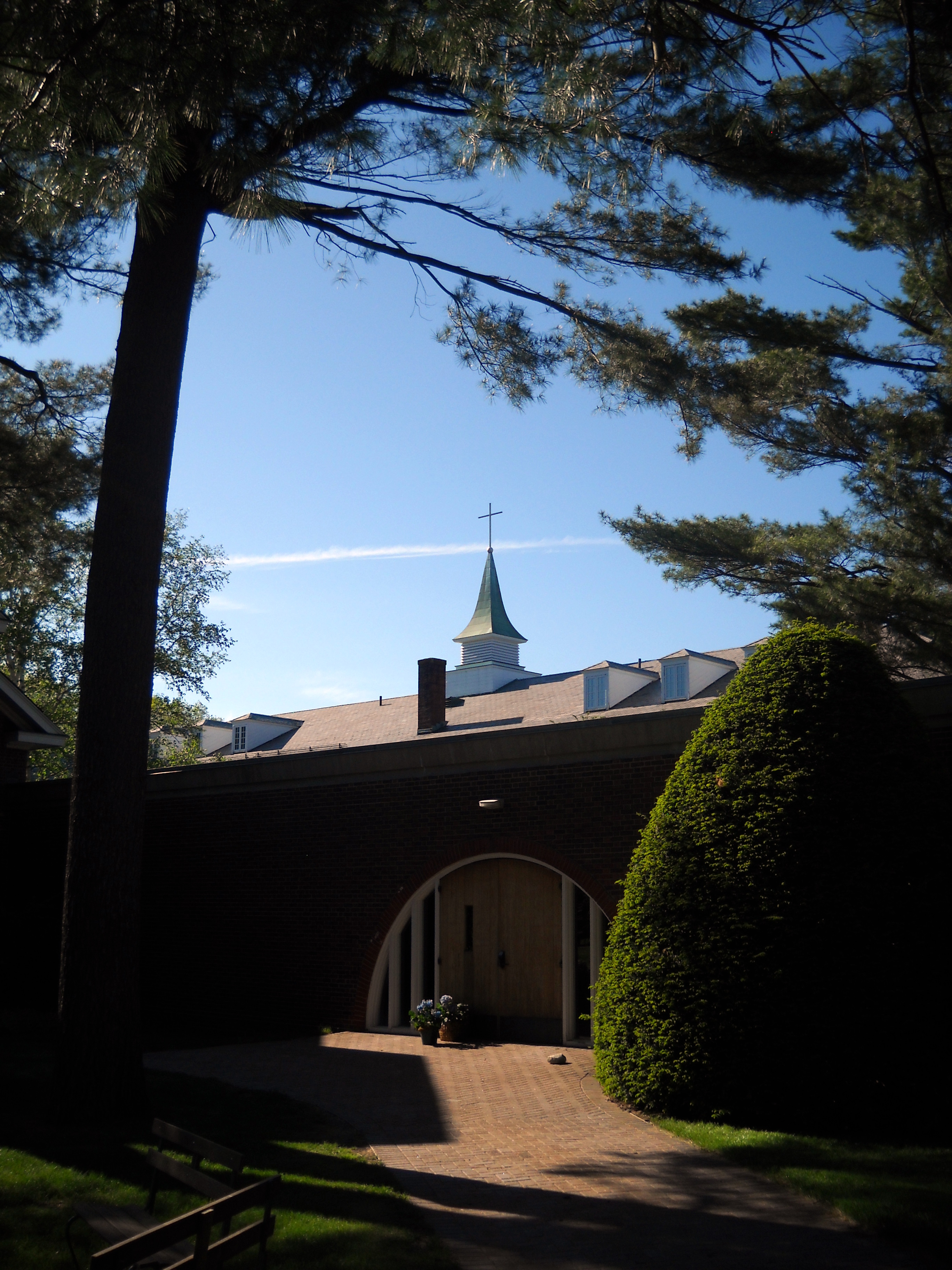
South Entrance into the abbey's cloister garden

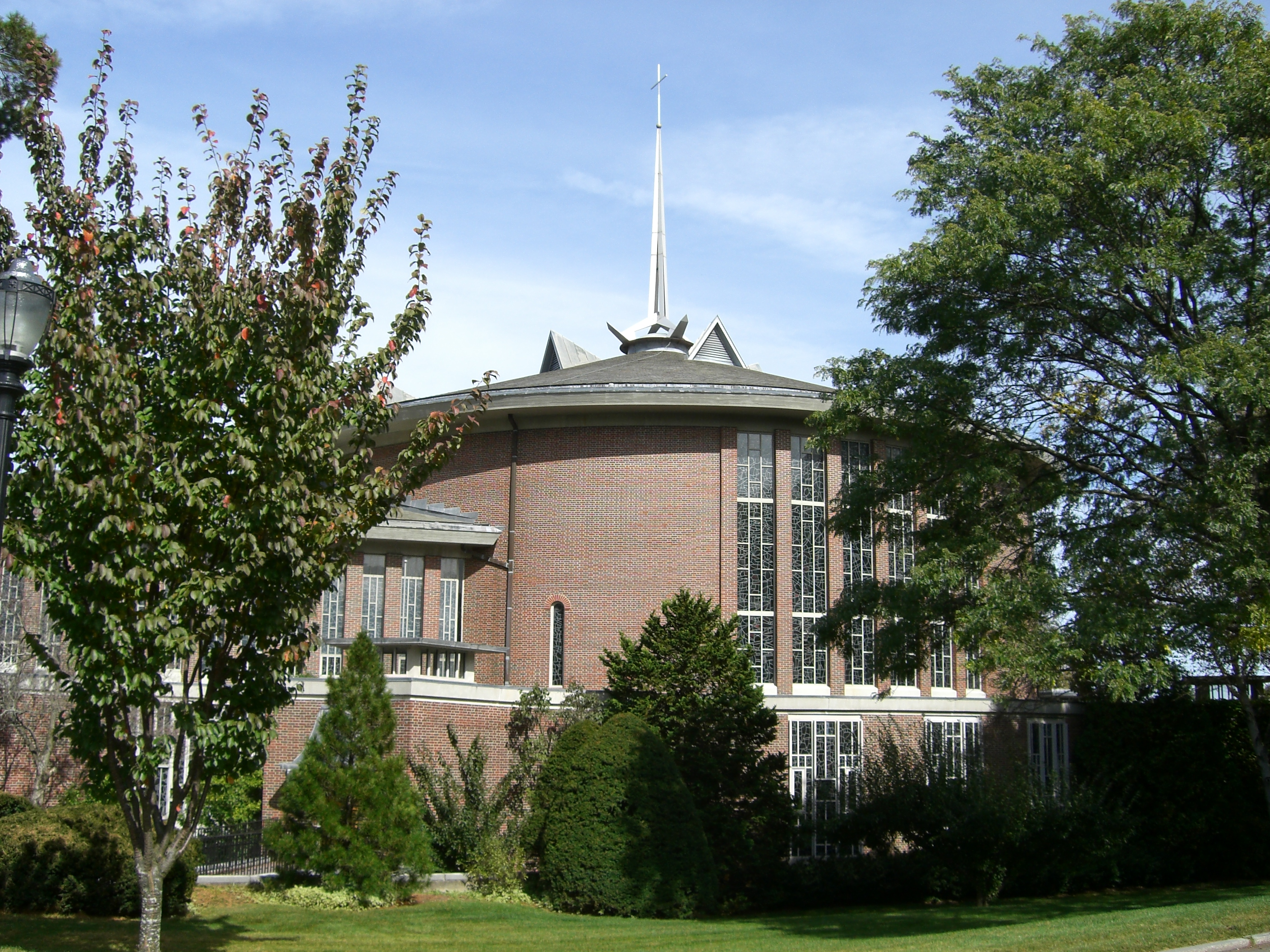
Abbey Church Exterior

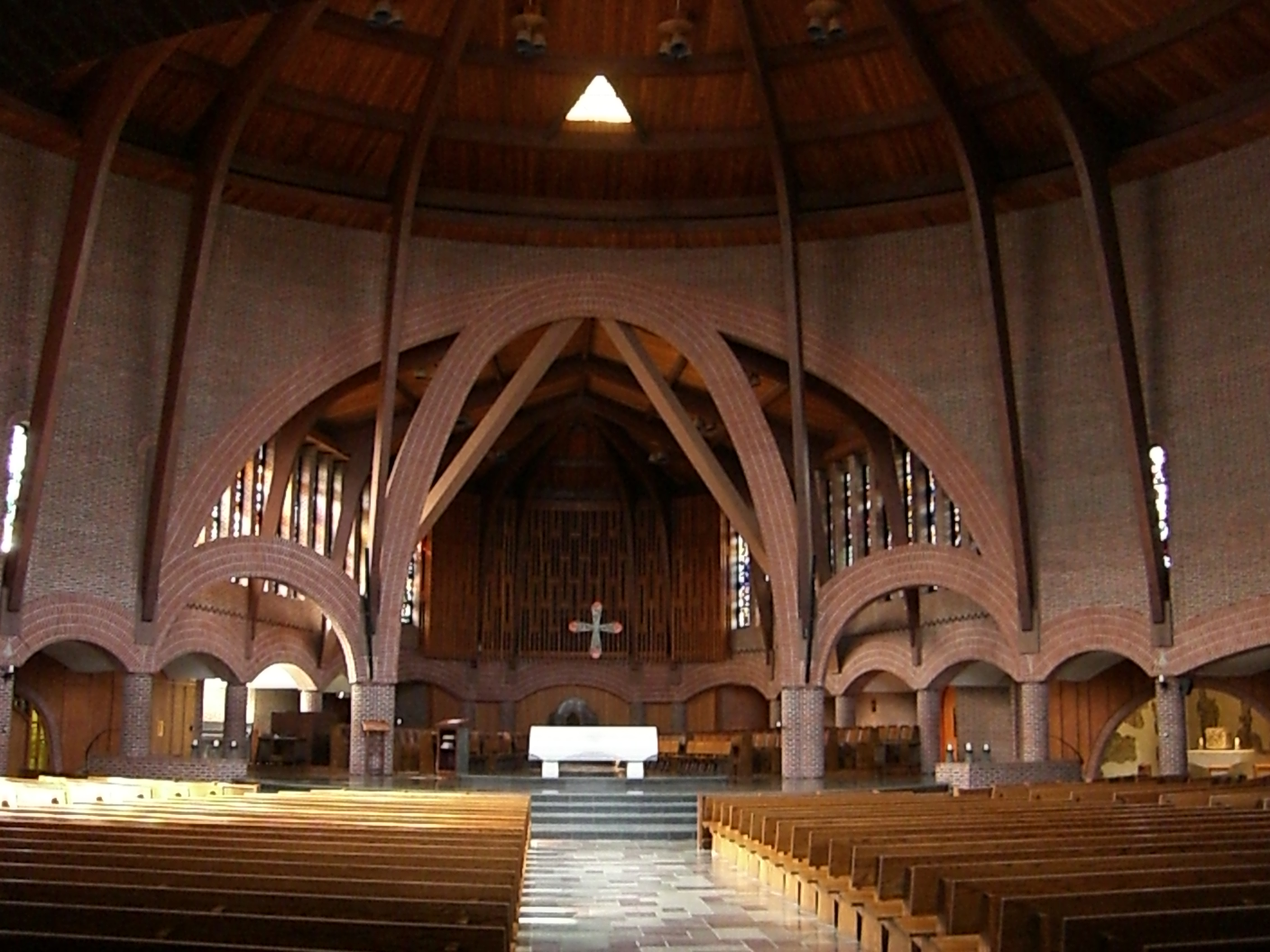
Abbey Church Interior

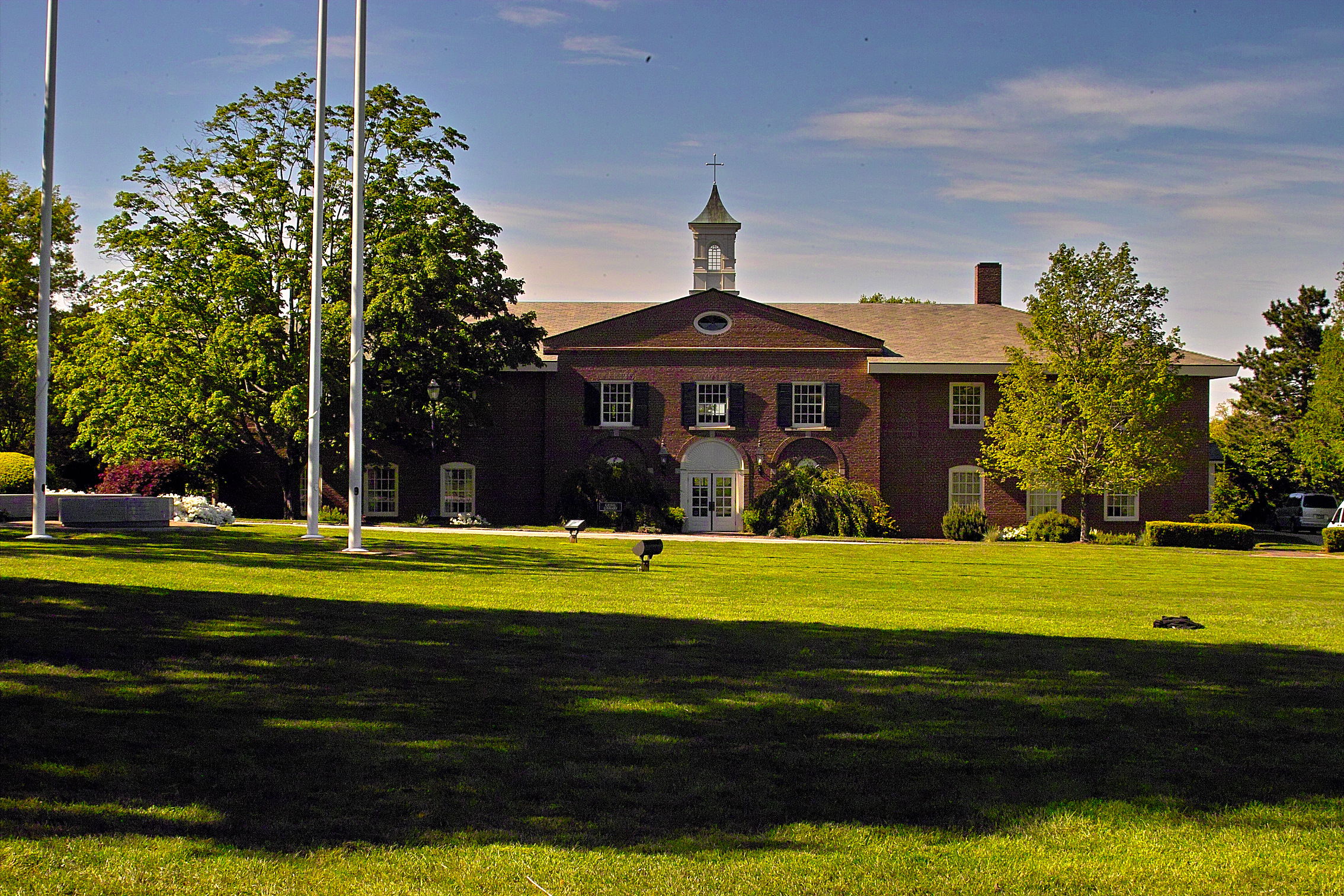
Geisel SAC Library

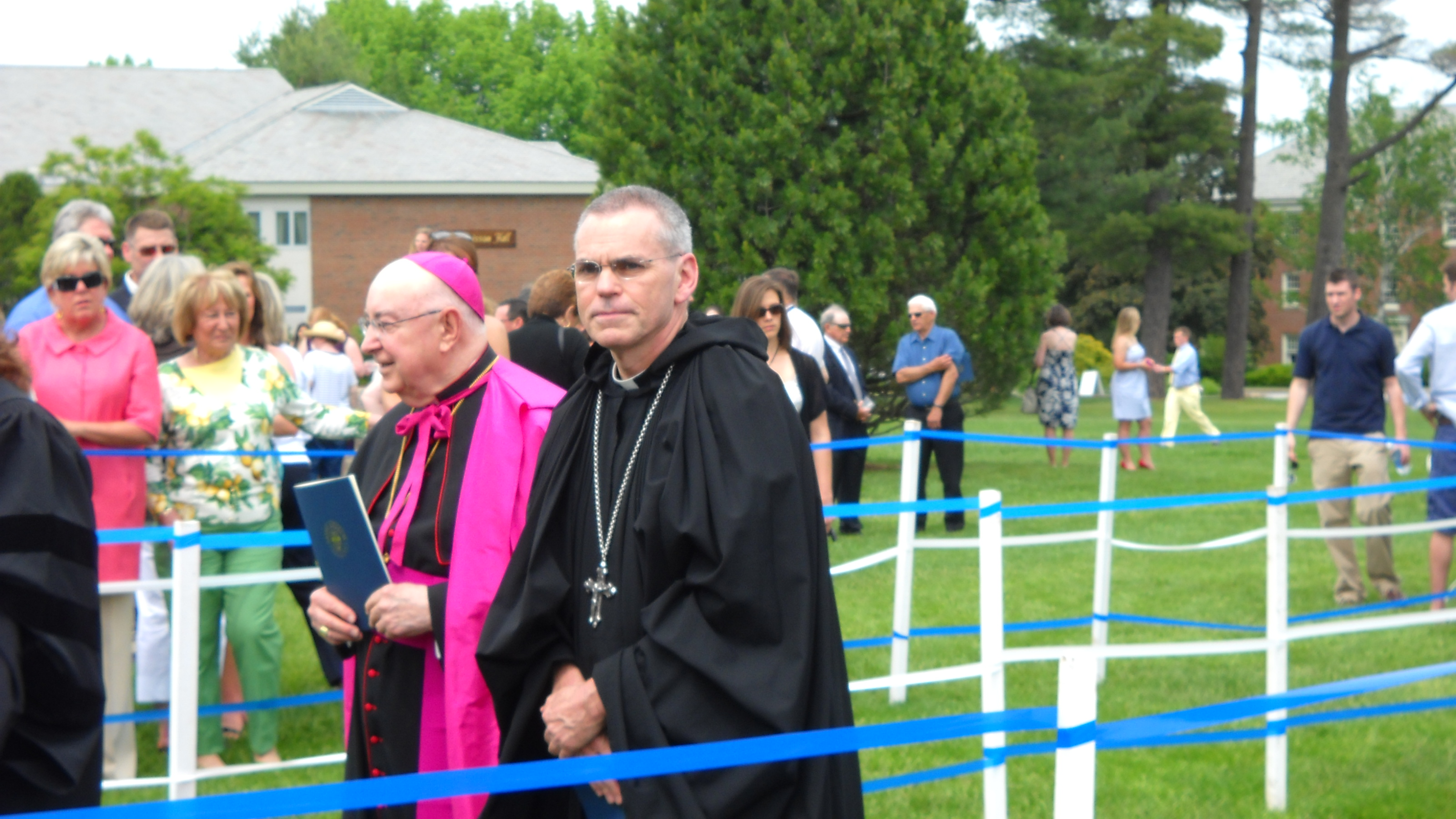
Bishop Joseph Gerry, O.S.B. (left) and Abbot Matthew Leavy, O.S.B. (right) walking into Saint Anselm College's 2010 commencement

Coat of arms of Abbot Mark Cooper, O.S.B.
