= Robert Edward Mulvee =

American prelate (1930–2018)

His Excellency, The Most Reverend Robert Edward Mulvee
- Bishop of Providence; Titular Bishop of Summa
- Church: Roman Catholic Church
- Diocese: Diocese of Providence
- Appointed: February 9, 1995 (Coadjutor)
- Installed: June 11, 1997
- Term ended: March 31, 2005
- Predecessor: Louis Edward Gelineau
- Successor: Thomas Joseph Tobin
- Previous posts: Auxiliary Bishop of Manchester (1977–1985); Bishop of Wilmington (1985–1995); Coadjutor Bishop of Providence (1995–1997)

Orders
- Ordination: June 30, 1957 by Henry Joseph O'Brien
- Consecration: April 14, 1977 by Odore Joseph Gendron, Ernest John Primeau, and John Francis Hackett

Personal details
- Born: February 15, 1930 Boston, Massachusetts, US
- Died: December 28, 2018 (aged 88) North Smithfield, Rhode Island, US
- Education: St. Thomas Seminary; Saint Paul University; American College of the Immaculate Conception; Pontifical Lateran University; Catholic University of Louvain
- Motto: As one who serves

Styles of Robert Edward Mulvee
- Reference style: His Excellency; The Most Reverend
- Spoken style: Your Excellency
- Religious style: Bishop

Robert Edward Mulvee (February 15, 1930 – December 28, 2018) was an American prelate of the Roman Catholic Church.

Mulvee served as an auxiliary bishop of the Diocese of Manchester in New Hampshire (1977-1985), as bishop of the Diocese of Wilmington in Delaware (1985–1995) and as bishop of the Diocese of Providence in Rhode Island (1997–2005).

== Biography ==
=== Early life ===
Robert Mulvee was born on February 15, 1930, in Boston, Massachusetts, to John F. and Jennie T. Mulvee. He studied at St. Thomas Seminary in Bloomfield, Connecticut; Saint Paul University in Ottawa, Ontario; and the American College of the Immaculate Conception in Leuven, Belgium.

=== Priesthood ===
Mulvee was ordained into the priesthood by Archbishop Henry Joseph O’Brien for the Diocese of Manchester in Leuven on June 30, 1957. After his ordination, the diocese assigned Mulvee pastoral work in parishes for several years. He was then sent to study in Europe, earning a Doctorate of Canon Law from the Pontifical Lateran University in Rome (1964) and a Master of Religious Education degree from the Catholic University of Louvain in Belgium Following his return to New Hampshire, Mulvee was named assistant chancellor of the diocese and in 1966 a papal chamberlain by the Vatican

=== Auxiliary Bishop of Manchester ===
On February 15, 1977, Mulvee was appointed as the first auxiliary bishop of Manchester and titular bishop of Summa by Pope Paul VI. While in Manchester, Mulvee stayed as a guest at Saint Anselm Abbey in Goffstown. He received his episcopal consecration on April 14, 1977, at the Cathedral of Saint Joseph in Manchester from Bishop Odore Gendron, with Bishops Ernest Primeau and John Hackett serving as co-consecrators.

=== Bishop of Wilmington ===
After the death of Bishop Thomas Mardaga, Pope John Paul II named Mulvee as the seventh bishop of Wilmington on February 19, 1985.

During his tenure as bishop of Wilmington, Mulvee emphasized collegiality in his administration of the diocese, helped restructure the Delmarva Ecumenical Agency into the Christian Council of Delaware and Maryland's Eastern Shore, and founded three new missions and raised a fourth to parish status.

=== Coadjutor Bishop and Bishop of Providence ===
John Paul II appointed Mulvee as coadjutor bishop of Providence on February 9, 1995. He succeeded Bishop Louis Gelineau upon the latter's resignation on June 11, 1997. On September 10, 2002, Mulvee announced a $13.5 million settlement of 36 victim lawsuits involving sexual abuse by 11 priests and one nun from the diocese. This settlement ended a ten-year dispute over sexual abuse claims between victims and the diocese. Mulvee made this statement:

I reach out with deep sadness to the victims. Certainly in the name of the church, I ask their forgiveness and offer an apology for the harm that has been done to them.

=== Retirement and legacy ===
Upon reaching the mandatory retirement age of 75, Mulvee submitted his letter of resignation to John Paul II on February 15, 2005. His resignation was accepted on March 31, 2005, and Bishop Thomas Tobin was appointed his successor. Mulvee served as apostolic administrator of the diocese until Tobin's installation on May 31, 2005.

On December 28, 2018, Robert Mulvee died at age 88 at St. Antoine Residence in North Smithfield. Rhode Island. Mulvee was buried at St. Ann Cemetery in Cranston, Rhode Island.

== See also ==
- Catholic Church hierarchy
- Catholic Church in the United States
- Historical list of the Catholic bishops of the United States
- List of Catholic bishops of the United States
- Lists of patriarchs, archbishops, and bishops

== Episcopal succession ==
Catholic Church titles
Preceded by –	Auxiliary Bishop of Manchester; 1977–1985	Succeeded by –
Preceded by Thomas Joseph Mardaga	Bishop of Wilmington; 1985–1995	Succeeded by Michael Angelo Saltarelli
Preceded by Louis Edward Gelineau	Bishop of Providence; 1997–2005	Succeeded by Thomas Joseph Tobin
