= Diocese of Manchester =

Diocese of Manchester may refer to:

- Anglican Diocese of Manchester, in England
- Diocese of Manchester, New Hampshire, United States, a Latin Church diocese of the Catholic Church
