= Sexual abuse scandal in the Roman Catholic Diocese of Manchester =

Sexual abuse scandal in Manchester

The sexual abuse scandal in Manchester diocese of New Hampshire is a significant episode in the series of Catholic sex abuse cases in the United States and Ireland.

== Management by Mgr. Gendron ==
Mgr. Odore Joseph Gendron was criticized for his management of sexual abuse cases among the clergy. He assigned Rev. Paul Aube to a Rochester parish and put him in charge of a youth program even though Aube had confessed to molesting a minor and requested to be kept away from children. Aube allegedly abused at least seven minors at Rochester.

== Destroying documents ==
Gendron was accused of destroying documents detailing child sexual abuse by Revs. Philip Petit and Gordon MacRae during the 1980s.

== 14 priests named for abuse ==
In early 2002, Bishop John McCormack publicly announced the names of 14 priests in the diocese who had been accused of sexually abusing children. In April of that same year, he was removed from his post as chairman of the United States Conference of Catholic Bishops' Ad Hoc Committee on Sexual Abuse. McCormack later admitted to reassigning pedophilic priests, but claimed poor file-keeping had kept him from knowing the full extent of the problem.

== Calls for resignation ==
Despite repeated calls for his resignation, including from the New Hampshire Union Leader, he has refused to do so, stating, "Pope John Paul II appointed me to be your shepherd...I will remain [to] toil ceaselessly on your behalf as bishop of Manchester."

== Accusation of lying about abuse ==
During a Mass in October 2002, several members of the congregation accused McCormack of lying about a priest he assigned to the parish without disclosing the latter's affair with a teenage boy, leading the Bishop to shout, "I'm not lying!"

== 2002-03 Settlement of Abuse Cases ==
In 2003, the diocese reached a settlement with the New Hampshire Attorney General's Office, which was investigating the child sex abuse scandal. The settlement spared the diocese from being criminally charged. In all, in the period of 2002–03, the diocese agreed to a $15.5 million settlement involving 176 claims of sex abuse.

The May 2003 settlement of 61 abuse claims for $6.5 million handled by Manchester attorney Ovide M. Lamontagne as counsel for the Manchester Diocese prevented the diocese from being criminally prosecuted. In December 2002, the diocese had admitted that its failure to protect children from sexual abuse may have been a violation of criminal law, becoming the first diocese in the United States to do so. Under threat of indictment by the New Hampshire Attorney General, McCormack signed an agreement acknowledging that the Attorney General office possessed evidence sufficient to win convictions as part of the settlement.

Lamontagne claimed that McCormack and other prominent church members wanted a speedy settlement and, in an example of behaving "pastorally" rather than as a litigant, instructed their attorneys to take a moderate stance and eschew hardline legal tactics. Lamontagne said of the diocese's legal strategy, "That is not typical in terms of client requests."

== Student petition against the bishop ==
In 2005, McCormack spoke at a baccalaureate service at Trinity High School despite a student petition asking him not to attend because of his role in the sex abuse scandal.
