= Woodside Priory School =

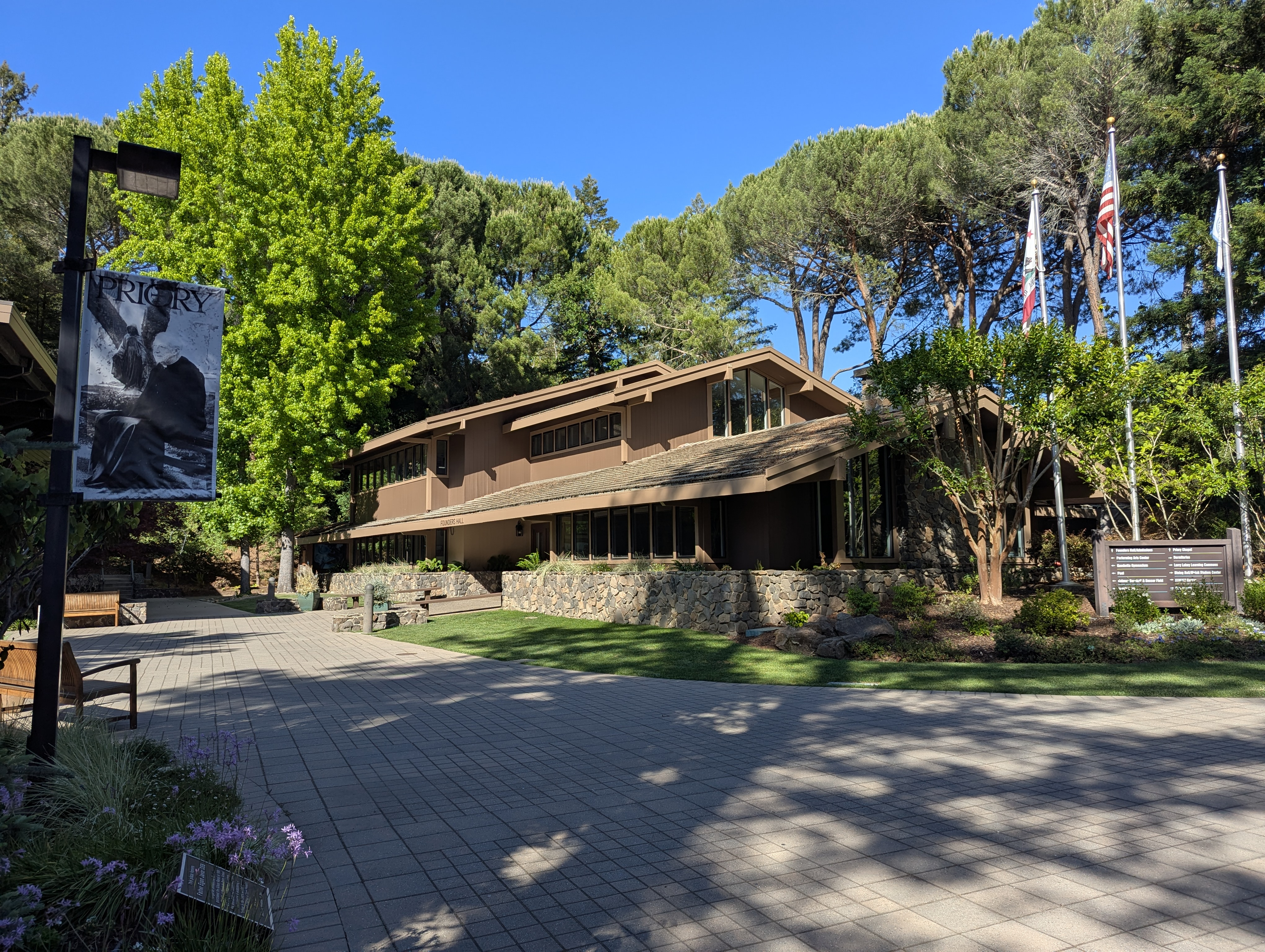
- Founders Hall in May 2025

Location
- 302 Portola Road; Portola Valley, California 94028-7897; United States
- Coordinates: 37°22′32″N 122°12′46″W

Information
- Type: Private, day and boarding school
- Motto: Ora Et Labora (Prayer and Work)
- Religious affiliations: Roman Catholic; Benedictine
- Patron saint: Saint Benedict
- Established: 1957; 69 years ago
- Founder: Father Egon Javor, OSB
- Oversight: Roman Catholic Archdiocese of San Francisco
- Head of school: Patrick Ruff
- Faculty: 57.8 (on an FTE basis)
- Grades: 6-12
- Gender: Co-educational
- Enrollment: 375 (2020-21)
- Student to teacher ratio: 6.7
- Campus size: 51 acres (210,000 m^{2})
- Campus type: Rural/suburban
- Colors: Black and blue
- Athletics conference: CCS - Central California Section
- Mascot: Panthers
- Team name: Panthers
- Accreditation: Western Association of Schools and Colleges
- Yearbook: Omnibus
- Tuition: 2020-21 school year $51,250 (day) $76,450 (boarding)
- Affiliation: Saint Anselm Abbey; Goffstown, NH
- Website: www.prioryca.org

Woodside Priory School (commonly known as The Priory) is an independent, co-educational, Benedictine Catholic, college-preparatory, day and boarding school in Portola Valley, California, United States. It is located within the Roman Catholic Archdiocese of San Francisco and is roughly equidistant from San Francisco to the north and San Jose to the south.

== History ==
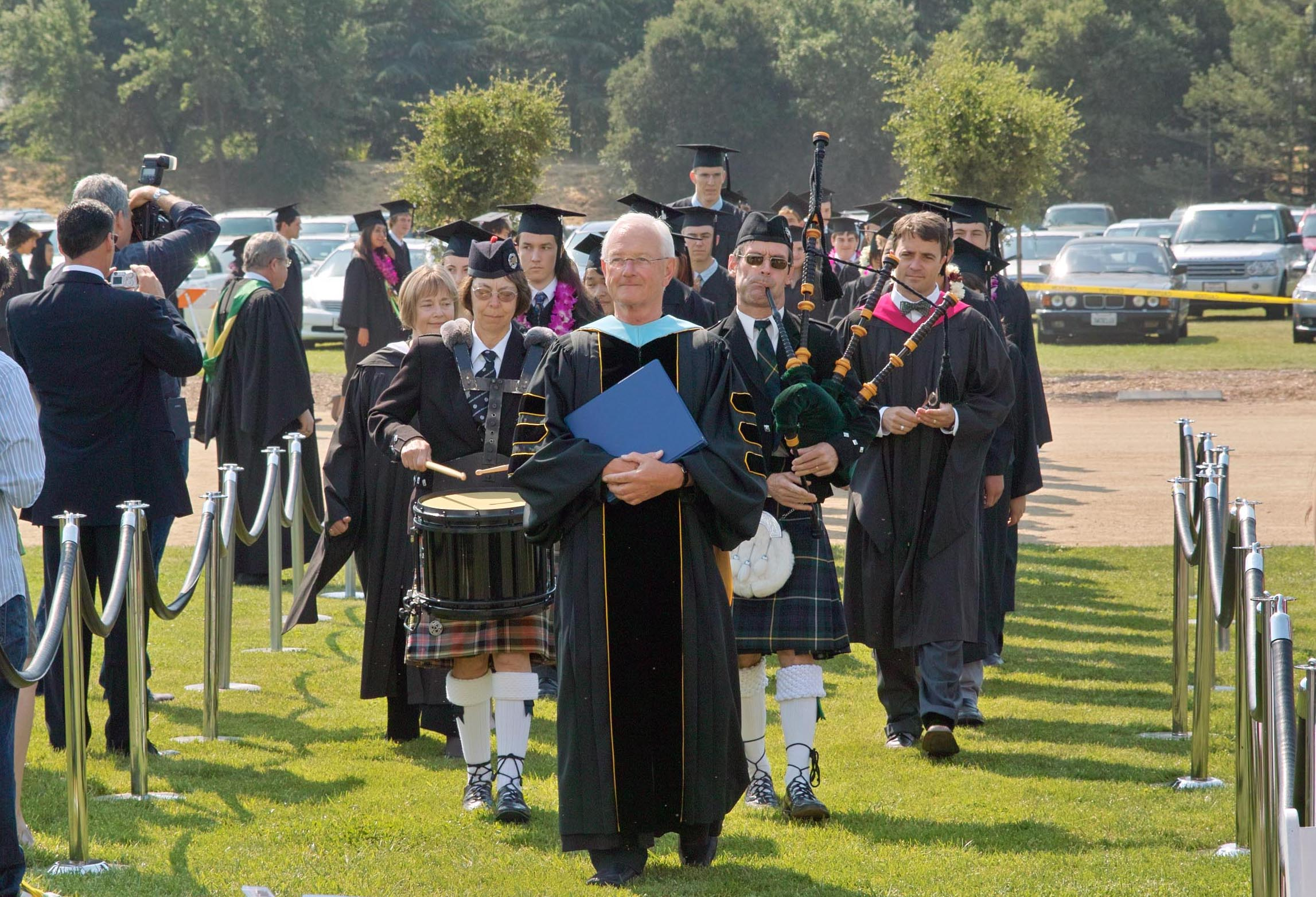
The 2008 graduation procession was led by Brother Edward Englund (1942–2014).

The Priory was founded in 1957 by a group of seven Hungarian Benedictine Monks from Saint Martin's Archabbey in Pannonhalma, Hungary. In 1974, the monks affiliated with Saint Anselm Abbey in Goffstown, New Hampshire.

The school began on an 18-acre (73,000 m^{2}) ranch and over the years has expanded significantly to the point that the campus now encompasses some 50 acres (200,000 m^{2}).

Originally the school was made up entirely of male boarders, but over the years the ratio of boarders to day students changed, and today the boarding school accounts for a smaller percentage of the upper school student body. In the early 1990s, the school began admitting females to the day program; the first coed senior class graduated in 1995. There have been female boarders since 2004.

The Priory was granted a seven-year accreditation by the Western Association of Schools and Colleges (WASC), the California Association of Independent Schools (CAIS) and the Western Catholic Education Association in June 2019.

== Athletics ==
The Priory offers football, cross country, volleyball, tennis, water polo, soccer, basketball, lacrosse, swimming, track and field, and baseball.

In March 2025, Priory's Boys Basketball team won the California Division IV Championship in Sacramento with a 83-66 victory over Fresno Christian School.

The Priory basketball gym was prominently featured in Stephen Curry: Underrated a documentary about Stephen Curry.
