= Leo Edward O'Neil =

American prelate

His Excellency, The Most Reverend Leo Edward O'Neil
- Bishop of Manchester; Titular Bishop of Bencenna
- Church: Roman Catholic Church
- See: Manchester
- In office: November 30, 1990 – November 30, 1997
- Predecessor: Odore Joseph Gendron
- Successor: John Brendan McCormack
- Previous posts: Auxiliary Bishop of Springfield in Massachusetts (1980–1989); Coadjutor Bishop of Manchester (1989–1990)

Orders
- Ordination: June 4, 1955 by Christopher Joseph Weldon
- Consecration: August 22, 1980 by Joseph Francis Maguire

Personal details
- Born: January 31, 1928 Holyoke, Massachusetts, US
- Died: November 30, 1997 (aged 69) Manchester, New Hampshire, US
- Education: Saint Anselm College; Grand Seminary of Montreal
- Motto: To love and serve

Leo Edward O'Neil (January 31, 1928 – November 30, 1997) was an American prelate of the Roman Catholic Church. He served as bishop of the Diocese of Manchester in New Hampshire from 1990 until his death in 1997. He previously served as an auxiliary bishop of the Diocese of Springfield in Massachusetts from 1980 to 1989 and as coadjutor bishop of Manchester from 1989 to 1990.

== Biography ==
=== Early life ===
Leo O'Neil was born on January 31, 1928, in Holyoke, Massachusetts. He attended both Blessed Sacrament School and Sacred Heart High School in that town. In 1945 he entered Maryknoll Junior Seminary in Clarks Summit, Pennsylvania. He studied at Saint Anselm College in Goffstown, New Hampshire, for a year before attending the Grand Seminary of Montreal in Montreal, Quebec from 1950 to 1955.

=== Priesthood ===
O'Neil was ordained to the priesthood in Springfield, Massachusetts, for the Diocese of Springfield in Massachusetts by Bishop Christopher Weldon on June 4, 1955. He then served as parochial vicar in several parishes in the diocese and was named pastor of St. Mary of the Assumption Parish at Haydenville, Massachusetts, in 1976.

=== Auxiliary Bishop of Springfield in Massachusetts ===
On June 30, 1980, O'Neil was appointed auxiliary bishop of Springfield in Massachusetts and titular bishop of Bencenna by Pope John Paul II. He received his episcopal consecration at St. Michael's Cathedral in Springfield on August 22, 1980, from Bishop Joseph Maguire, with Bishops Tomás Roberto Manning and Timothy Harrington serving as co-consecrators.

=== Coadjutor Bishop and Bishop of Manchester ===
John Paul II named O'Neil as coadjutor bishop of Manchester on October 17, 1989. When Bishop Odore Gendron retired, O'Neil automatically succeeded him on June 12, 1990. He was installed at the Cathedral of St. Joseph in Manchester on November 30, 1990.

During his tenure, O'Neil worked to foster a common vision among New Hampshire Catholics with a program entitled "Renewing the Covenant." He also won the affection of people with his inspirational homilies and flair for poetry. In 1993, O'Neil underwent surgery for multiple myeloma. He continued to battle with cancer and serve as bishop for four more years.

=== Death ===
O'Neil died at age 69 in Manchester on November 30, 1997 — the seventh anniversary of his installation.

Catholic Church titles
Preceded by Odore Joseph Gendron	Bishop of Manchester; 1990–1997	Succeeded by John Brendan McCormack
