= John Brendan McCormack =

Catholic bishop (1935–2021)

His Excellency, The Most Reverend John Brendan McCormack
- Bishop of Manchester
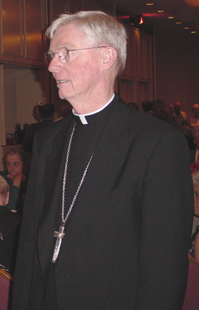
- Bishop McCormack in 2001
- Archdiocese: Boston
- Diocese: Manchester
- Appointed: July 21, 1998
- Installed: September 22, 1998
- Term ended: September 19, 2011
- Predecessor: Leo Edward O'Neil
- Successor: Peter Anthony Libasci
- Previous post: Auxiliary Bishop of Boston

Orders
- Ordination: February 2, 1960 by Richard Cushing
- Consecration: December 27, 1995 by Bernard Francis Law, William Wakefield Baum, and Alfred Clifton Hughes

Personal details
- Born: August 12, 1935 Winthrop, Massachusetts, U.S.
- Died: September 21, 2021 (aged 86) Manchester, New Hampshire, U.S.
- Denomination: Roman Catholic Church
- Education: St. John's Seminary
- Motto: In all things, Christ
- Coat of arms

Styles of John Brendan McCormick
- Reference style: His Excellency; The Most Reverend
- Spoken style: Your Excellency
- Religious style: Bishop

John Brendan McCormack (August 12, 1935 – September 21, 2021) was an American prelate of the Roman Catholic Church. He served as the ninth bishop of the Diocese of Manchester from 1998 until 2011.

== Biography ==
=== Early life and education ===
John McCormack was born on August 12, 1935 in Winthrop, Massachusetts, to Cornelius and Eleanor (née Noonan) McCormack. Raised in Cambridge, Massachusetts, he attended Boston College High School and St. John's Seminary, both in Boston, Massachusetts.

=== Ordination and ministry ===
McCormack was ordained to the priesthood for the Archdiocese of Boston at the Cathedral of the Holy Cross in Boston by Cardinal Richard Cushing on February 2, 1960. After his ordination, the archdiocese assigned McCormack as an associate pastor at St. James Parish in Salem, Massachusetts.

McCormack served as executive director of the North Shore Catholic Charities Center in Peabody, Massachusetts, from 1967 to 1981. During this time, he also pursued his graduate studies at Boston College, where he obtained a Master of Social Work degree in 1969. In 1981, he was appointed pastor of Immaculate Conception Parish in Malden, Massachusetts.

In 1984, McCormack was named secretary for ministerial personnel. In this position, McCormack was Cardinal Bernard Francis Law's point person on hearing complaints against priests accused of sexual misconduct and removing some of them from active duty. McCormack was appointed pastor of St. Francis Xavier Parish in Weymouth, Massachusetts, in 1994.

=== Auxiliary bishop of Boston, Massachusetts ===
On November 21, 1995, McCormack was appointed as an auxiliary bishop of Boston and titular bishop of Cerbali by Pope John Paul II. He received his episcopal consecration at the Cathedral of the Holy Cross on December 27, 1995, from Law, with Cardinal William Wakefield Baum and Bishop Alfred Clifton Hughes serving as co-consecrators.He chose for his episcopal motto: "Christ in all things." As an auxiliary, he served as regional bishop for the South Pastoral Region.

=== Bishop of Manchester, New Hampshire ===
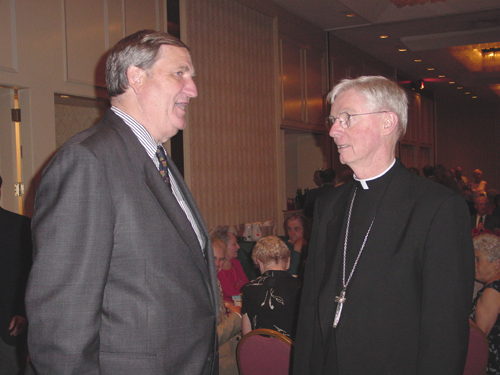
Bishop McCormack with U.S. Senator Bob Smith (2001)

McCormack was named by John Paul II as the ninth bishop of Manchester on July 21, 1998, succeeding the late Bishop Leo O'Neil. McCormack was formally installed in Manchester, New Hampshire, on September 22, 1998.

In early 2002, McCormack publicly announced the names of 14 priests in the diocese who had been accused of sexually abusing children (cf Sexual abuse scandal in Manchester diocese). In 2003, the diocese reached a settlement with the New Hampshire Attorney General's Office, which was investigating the child sex abuse scandal. The settlement spared the diocese from being criminally charged. In all, in the period of 2002–03, the diocese agreed to a $15.5 million settlement involving 176 claims of sex abuse.

The May 2003 settlement of 61 abuse claims for $6.5 million prevented the diocese from being criminally prosecuted. In December 2002, the diocese had admitted that its failure to protect children from sexual abuse may have been a violation of criminal law, becoming the first diocese in the United States to do so. Under threat of indictment by the New Hampshire Attorney General, McCormack signed an agreement acknowledging that the state possessed evidence sufficient to win convictions as part of the settlement.

Lamontagne claimed that McCormack and other prominent church members wanted a speedy settlement and, in an example of behaving "pastorally" rather than as a litigant, instructed their attorneys to take a moderate stance and eschew hardline legal tactics. Lamontagne said of the diocese's legal strategy, "That is not typical in terms of client requests."

=== Retirement and death ===
On August 10, 2010, in accordance with canon 401 §1 of the 1983 Code of Canon Law, McCormack submitted his resignation to Pope Benedict XVI as bishop of Manchester. His resignation was accepted on September 19, 2011. The pope appointed Auxiliary Bishop Peter Anthony Libasci as his successor.

McCormack died in Manchester on September 21, 2021, at the age of 86.

== See also ==
- Catholic Church hierarchy
- Catholic Church in the United States
- Historical list of the Catholic bishops of the United States
- List of Catholic bishops of the United States
- Lists of patriarchs, archbishops, and bishops

== Works cited ==
- Code of Canon Law (CIC). Vatican Publishing House. 1983.

== Episcopal succession ==
Catholic Church titles
Preceded by –	Bishop Emeritus of Manchester; 2011–2021	Succeeded by –
Preceded by Leo Edward O'Neil	Bishop of Manchester; 1998–2011	Succeeded by Peter Anthony Libasci
Preceded by –	Auxiliary Bishop of Boston; 1995–1998	Succeeded by –
