= Mount Royal Academy (New Hampshire) =

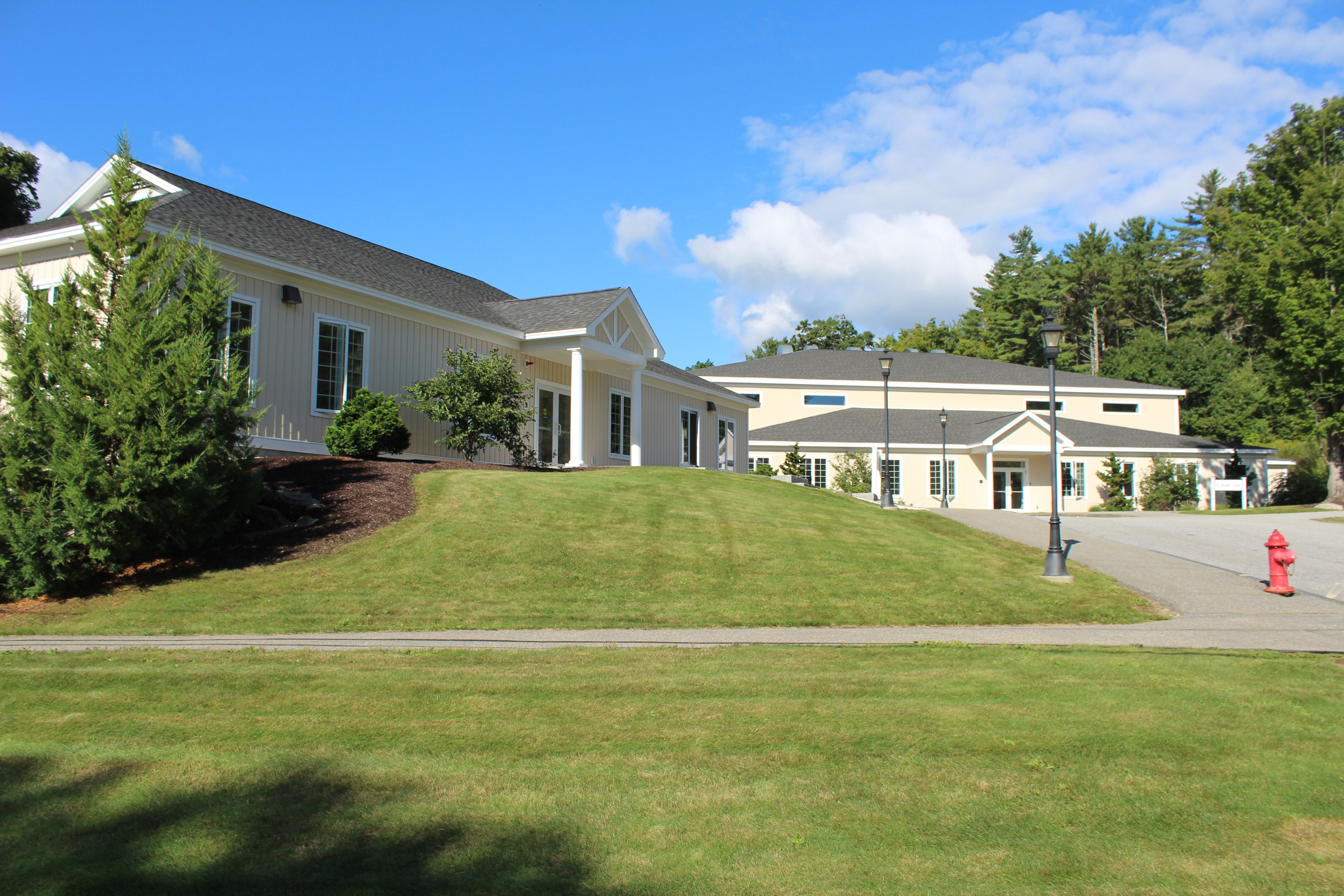

Location
- 26 Seven Hearths Lane; Sunapee, (Sullivan County), New Hampshire 03782; United States; 43°23′58″N 72°05′07″W

Information
- Type: Private, Coeducational
- Motto: Educating the whole person, one student at a time.
- Religious affiliation: Roman Catholic
- Patron saint: Saint Joseph
- Established: 1994
- Headmaster: Derek Tremblay
- Academic dean: Lisa Sweet
- Chaplain: Fr. Michael Sartori
- Grades: PK–12
- Campus: Rural
- Colors: Blue and White
- Athletics: NHIAA Div. 4
- Sports: Soccer, Basketball, Swimming, Track and Field, Baseball, Cross Country Skiing
- Team name: Knights
- Accreditation: NAPCIS
- Tuition: $5000 - $9750
- Website: www.mountroyalacademy.com

Mount Royal Academy is a private, Roman Catholic pre-K, elementary and high school in Sunapee, New Hampshire. It is located in the Roman Catholic Diocese of Manchester.

== Background ==
Mount Royal Academy is a private Catholic school centrally located in New Hampshire's Dartmouth–Lake Sunapee Region. What began as an elementary school (kindergarten through 8th grade), has grown to include a preschool with three-and-four-year-old programs and a liberal arts college-preparatory high school.

In 1994, a group of parents who wanted their children to receive an authentic Catholic education modeled after the classical liberal arts curriculum. After traveling on pilgrimage to Saint Joseph's Oratory of Mount Royal in Montreal, they resolved to found a private, independent school that was faithful to the Catholic church.

Over three decades, Mount Royal Academy has continued to thrive. A member of the National Association of Private Catholic and Independent Schools, it currently educates over 200 students in pre-k through grade 12. The school falls under the ecclesiastical authority of the Bishop of Manchester, but the Diocese of Manchester neither oversees it nor funds it.

The school has been recognized as a school of excellence by the Cardinal Newman Society.

Niche.com has rated the school as the number-one private Catholic high school in New Hampshire.
