= Precausa =

Africa Proconsularis (125 AD)

Precausa (Latin: Præcausa) was an ancient civitas of the Roman province of Byzacena in North Africa. Its exact location remains unknown but it was in the present Sahel region of Tunisia.

Precausa was also the seat of an ancient diocese. Only one bishop of Precause is known from antiquity, Adeodato, who attended the Synod of Carthage (484) called by the Vandal king Huneric, after which Adeodato was exiled.

Today Præcausa survives as titular bishop. It was erected as a titular see in 1933. The bishopric remains a titular bishopric of the Roman Catholic Church today and the current bishop is Józef Wysocki, auxiliary bishop emeritus of Elbląg, Poland. Cardinal Rosalio José Castillo Lara was bishop of Præcausa for a time.
