= Diocese of Manchester, New Hampshire =

Latin Catholic diocese in the United States

Diocese of Manchester Diocensis Manchesteriensis

Catholic
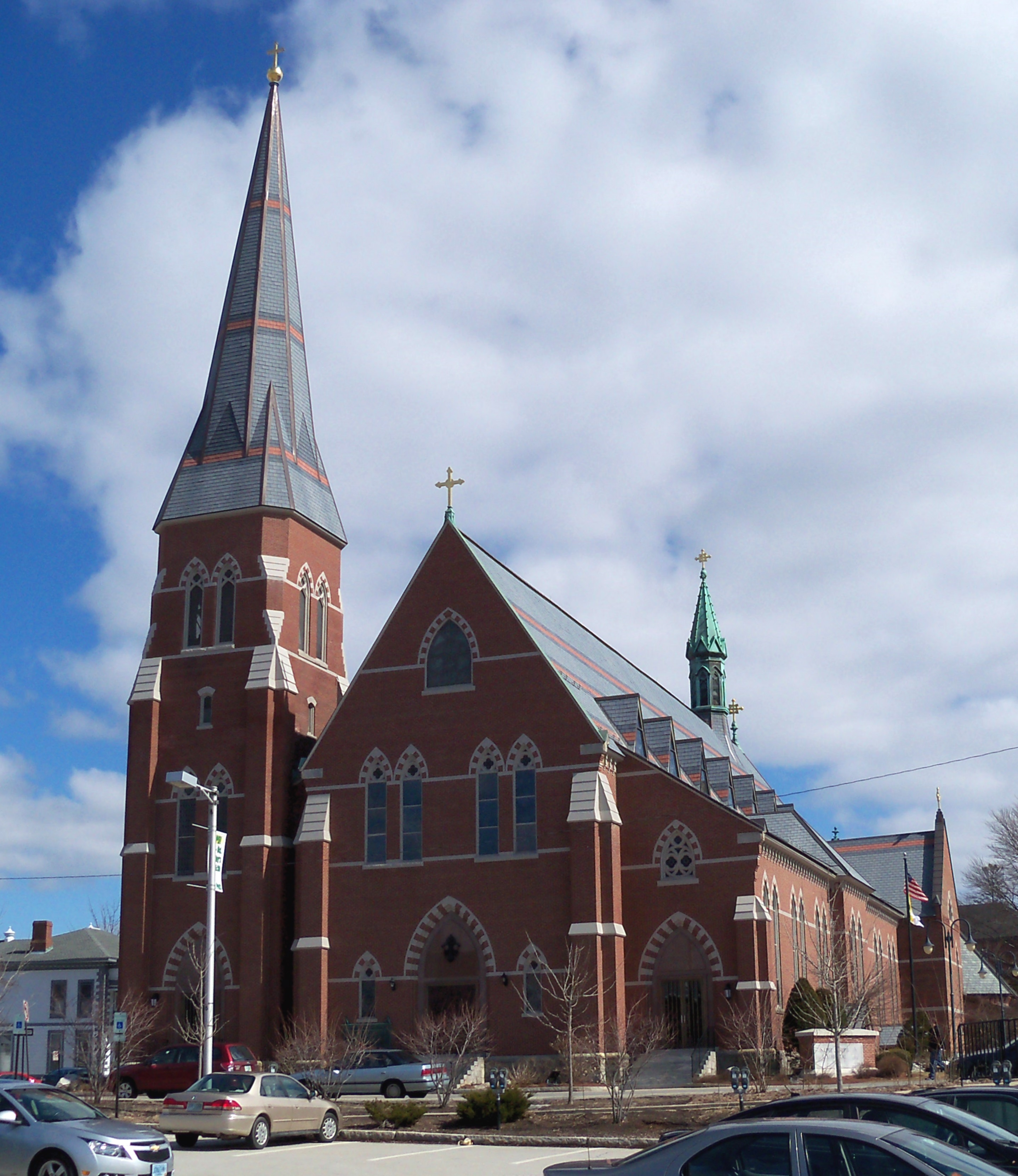
- Cathedral of St. Joseph

- Coat of arms

Location
- Country: United States
- Territory: New Hampshire
- Ecclesiastical province: Boston
- Metropolitan: Boston
- Headquarters: Manchester, New Hampshire
- Coordinates: 42°59′52″N 71°27′17″W

Statistics
- Area: 9,305 sq mi (24,100 km^{2})
- Population: Total; Catholics: (as of 2019); 1,356,458; 330,160 (24.3%)

Information
- Denomination: Catholic
- Sui iuris church: Latin Church
- Rite: Roman Rite
- Established: April 15, 1884
- Cathedral: Cathedral of Saint Joseph
- Patron saints: Saint Joseph; Saint Patrick

Current leadership
- Pope: Leo XIV
- Bishop: Peter Anthony Libasci
- Metropolitan Archbishop: Richard Henning
- Bishops emeritus: Francis Joseph Christian Auxiliary Bishop Emeritus (1996-2018)

Map
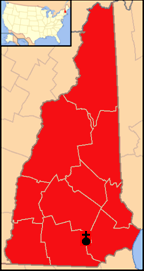

Website
- www.catholicnh.org

The Diocese of Manchester (Latin: Diocensis Manchesteriensis) is a diocese of the Catholic Church for New Hampshire in the United States. It is a suffragan diocese of the Archdiocese of Boston. The mother church is the Cathedral of St. Joseph in Manchester.

== History ==
=== 1680 to 1783 ===
During the 17th century, the first few Catholics in present-day New Hampshire area were probably members of the Sokwaki and Pennacook tribes who had been converted by missionaries from the French colony of New France. However, the vast majority of the first settlers in New Hampshire were English Protestants, many of them Puritans from Massachusetts. Like the other American colonies, the authorities in New Hampshire enacted restrictions on the legal rights of Catholics. In 1679, a royal commission in Portsmouth required all public officials and ministers in the Province of New Hampshire, including Catholics, to take an oath of supremacy to the Anglican Church.

During King William's War in the late 1600s, Native American allies of the French captured several European women in New Hampshire. These women later converted to Catholicism; one of them traveled to New France to enter an Ursuline convent. In 1694, during a French raid on settlements near Durham, the first Catholic masses in New Hampshire were celebrated by two Jesuit priests accompanying the expedition. However, there would be no organized Catholic communities in New Hampshire until the 19th century. In 1896, the province enacted a new test oath aimed at Catholics.

With the start of the American Revolutionary War in 1776, attitudes towards Catholics shifted in the American colonies. The rebel leaders needed to gain the support of Catholics for their cause. In addition, the alliance with Catholic France fostered a more favorable attitude among Americans towards Catholicism. However, when the new State of New Hampshire enacted its constitution in 1784, it failed to remove the colonial oath requirements.

=== 1783 to 1884 ===
After the American Revolution ended in 1783, Pope Pius VI erected in 1784 the Prefecture Apostolic of the United States, encompassing the entire territory of the new nation. The State of New Hampshire was admitted to the union in 1788. Pius VI created the Diocese of Baltimore, the first diocese in the United States, to replace the prefecture apostolic in 1789.

Pope Pius VII erected the Diocese of Boston on April 8, 1808, including New Hampshire in its jurisdiction. The first Catholic church in New Hampshire, St. Mary's, was built in 1823 in Claremont by a father and son, both Anglican priests, who had converted to Catholicism. The first parish in New Hampshire was St. Aloysius in Dover, erected in 1830. It was estimated in 1835 that there were 387 Catholics, two churches, and two priests in the state.

With the industrialization of New Hampshire in the 19th century, many Catholic Irish and French Canadian immigrants started settling there. In 1853, Pope Pius IX erected the Diocese of Portland in Maine, including New Hampshire in its territory. In 1858, the first Catholic grammar school in the state opened in Manchester.

=== 1884 to 1944 ===
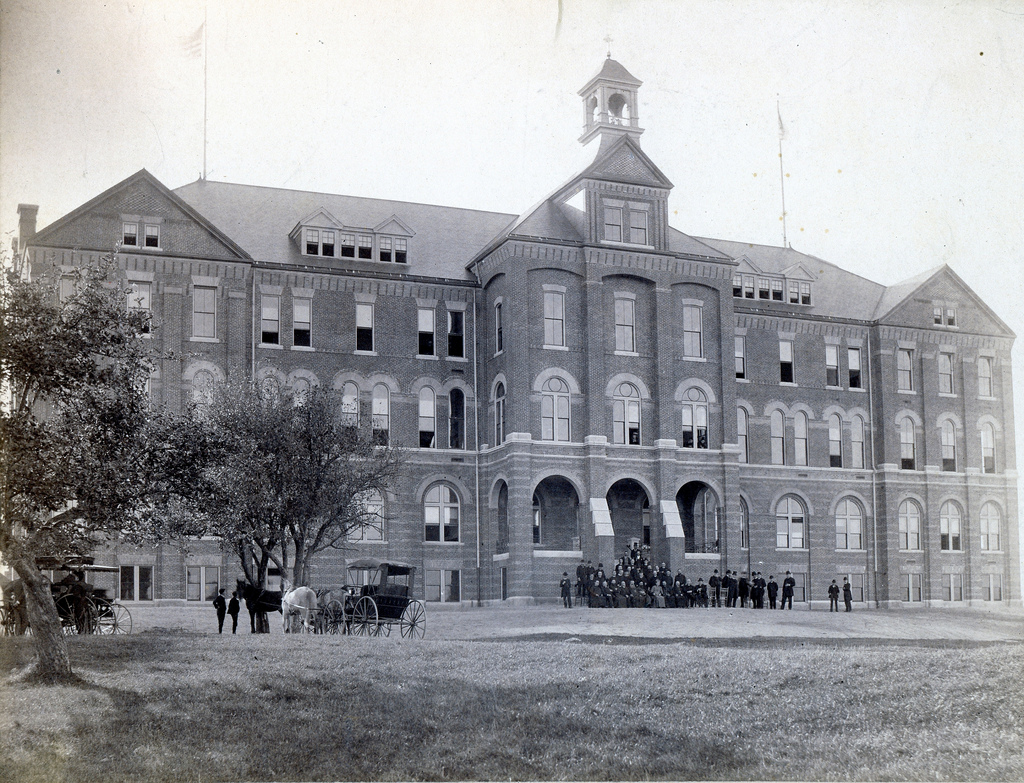
St. Anselm College, Goffstown, New Hampshire (1893)

Pope Leo XIII erected the Diocese of Manchester on April 15, 1884, removing New Hampshire from the Diocese of Portland. Leo XIII appointed Denis Bradley of Portland as the first bishop of Manchester. During Bradley's tenure, the Catholic population went from 45,000 to over 100,000 and the number of priests from 40 to 107. At some point in the 1880s, Bradley contacted the Benedictine monks at Saint Mary's Abbey in Newark, New Jersey, about creating a Catholic college in New Hampshire. The Benedictines opened Saint Anselm College in Goffstown in 1889.

After Bradley's death in late 1903, Pope Pius X appointed John Delany of Manchester as the second bishop of Manchester. However, after only 21 months in office, Delany died in 1906. His replacement as bishop was George Guertin of Manchester, appointed by Pius X in 1907. Between 1907 and 1926, Guertin added 16 new parishes in the diocese; five were French-speaking and two were Polish-speaking. After the American entry into World War I in 1917, Guertin had the diocese purchase a $15,000 war bond; using his personal funds, he purchased $5 war saving stamps for each student in the cathedral parish school. In 1930, Guertin decreed that Catholic parents in the diocese must send their children to Catholic schools or be denied absolution.

After Guertin died in 1931, Pope Pius XI appointed Auxiliary Bishop John Peterson of Boston as the fourth bishop of Manchester. A major area of tension in the diocese came from ethnic strife between the Irish and French-Canadian communities. A French-speaker, Peterson told a Manchester dinner audience in 1932 that he condemned all religious and ethnic hatred and would not support any cause based in hatred. He was able to gain the trust of French-Canadian Catholics in the diocese with his words and actions. Rivier College for girls was founded by the Sisters of the Presentation of Mary in Nashua in 1933. In 1934, in the midst of the Great Depression, Peterson enacted austerity spending measures for the diocese.

=== 1944 to 1990 ===
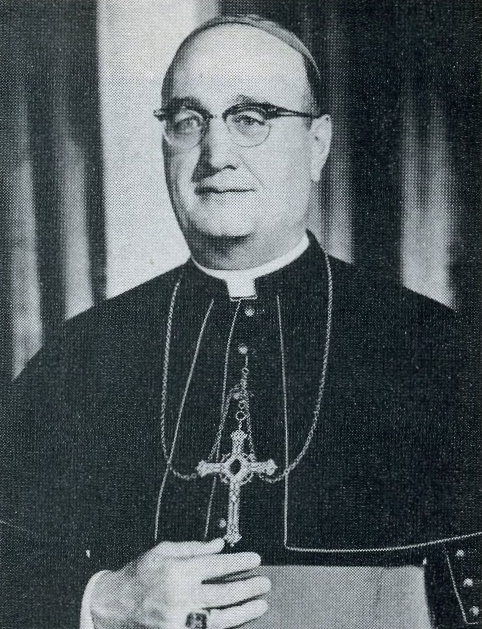
Bishop Primeau (2009)

With the 1944 death of Peterson, Pope Pius XII appointed Bishop Matthew Brady from the Diocese of Burlington to be bishop of Manchester. He presided over a period of unprecedented growth in the diocese, founding 27 parishes in 11 years and authorizing the construction of nearly 50 churches and numerous schools, convents, and other facilities. The number of parishioners increased by 50,000, and the number of priests and religious from around 650 to over 1,600. For all these accomplishments he was nicknamed "Brady the Builder."

Pope John XXIII appointed Ernest Primeau from the Archdiocese of Chicago as bishop of Manchester in 1959 following Brady's death that year. Primeau founded the first foreign mission of the diocese in 1963 in Cartago, Colombia. During his tenure, the number of Catholics in the diocese increased by 43,000 and the number of parishes by 11; however, weekly Mass attendance declined from over 70% to below 50%. Primeau retired as bishop of Manchester in 1974.

Odore Gendron of Manchester was appointed bishop of that diocese by Pope Paul VI in 1974.Gendron created a permanent diaconate in the diocese and joined the New Hampshire Council of Churches. He also founded Magdalen College in Bedford in 1975. A group of Catholic laymen established the Thomas More College of Liberal Arts in Merrimack in 1978.

In 1983, four nuns with the Sisters of Mercy settled a lawsuit against Gendron and the diocese after being fired from their teaching jobs in 1982 at Sacred Heart School in Hampton. It was the first lawsuit by nuns against their bishop in US history.

In 1989, Pope John Paul II appointed Auxiliary Bishop Leo Edward O'Neil of Springfield in Massachusetts as coadjutor bishop in Manchester.

=== 1990 to present ===
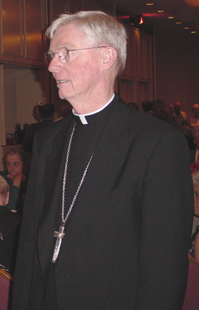
Bishop McCormack (2001)

When Gedron retired in 1990, O'Neil succeeded him as bishop of Manchester.During his tenure, O'Neil worked to foster a common vision among New Hampshire Catholics with a program entitled "Renewing the Covenant." He died in 1997.

John Paul II appointed Auxiliary Bishop John McCormack of Boston as O'Neil's replacement in 1998. In April 2011, McCormack criticized proposed cuts in the New Hampshire state budget that would impact the poor. In response, Republican State Representative D.J. Bettencourt called McCormack a "pedophile pimp" with no moral authority to criticize anybody. New Hampshire Republican Party Chairman Jack Kimball immediately disavowed Bettencourt's remarks.

After McCormack retired in 2011, Pope Benedict XVI appointed Auxiliary Bishop Peter Libasci from the Diocese of Rockville Centre as bishop of Manchester that same year. In 2014, Edward Arsenault pleaded guilty to embezzling $300,000 during the 2000s from a Catholic hospital, from the estate of a deceased priest and from McCormack. Arsenault spent the money on trips with a male companion. Arsenault was sentenced to four years in prison in 2014 and laicized by the Vatican in 2017.

In 2019, Libasci placed the Slaves of the Immaculate Heart of Mary, a religious order in Richmond, under precepts of prohibition. They were prohibited from performing sacrament on their property and from calling themselves a Catholic association. Libasci said the Slaves were in contravention of the tenant of salvation only being available in the Catholic Church. The order appealed Libasci's ruling to the Congregation for the Doctrine of the Faith in Rome, but the Congregation declined to hear it..As of 2026, Libasci is the bishop.

=== Sexual abuse ===
In early 2002, Bishop McCormack announced the names of 14 diocesan priests who had been accused of sexually abusing children.

Court papers released in January 2003 showed that Bishop Gendron destroyed records of sexual abuse by two different priests during the 1980s.

- The first instance was in 1986 for Philip Petit, a diocesan priest who molested a teenager between 1979 and 1981. Petit left the priesthood in 1986 and Gendron destroyed all of his treatment records at Petit's request. Petit was laicized in 2018.
- The second instance happened in 1989, when the Servants of the Paraclete treatment facility in New Mexico requested that Gendron destroy the treatment records of Gordon MacRae, a diocesan priest who was a former patient. In 1994, MacRae was sentenced to 33 to 67 years in state prison for molesting children.

A 2003 report by the Attorney General revealed that Gendron helped a priest accused of sexual abuse avoid criminal charges. In 1975, police in Nashua, New Hampshire, had arrested Paul Aube, a diocese priest, after finding him with a boy in a car, both with their pants down. Aube, who had admitted to acts of sexual abuse in 1972, confessed his guilt to Gendron. He asked Gendron to send him for treatment and relieve him of parish duties. Instead, Gendron called the Nashua police chief to drop charges against Aube. Gendron then transferred Aube to a parish in Rochester, New Hampshire. In 1981, the mother of a 15-year-old boy discovered Aube abusing him. When advised of the new allegation, Gendron did not report Aube to the police. In 2002, Aube turned himself into New Hampshire state authorities and became a cooperating witness.

In 2004, Leo Landry, a priest convicted of sexually abusing minors, was sentenced to lifetime probation.In July 2019, the diocese released a list of 73 priests and religious order members who were "credibly accused" of committing acts of sexual abuse. Some of those listed were criminally convicted, defrocked, removed from public ministry, or died without receiving punishment.

== Bishops ==
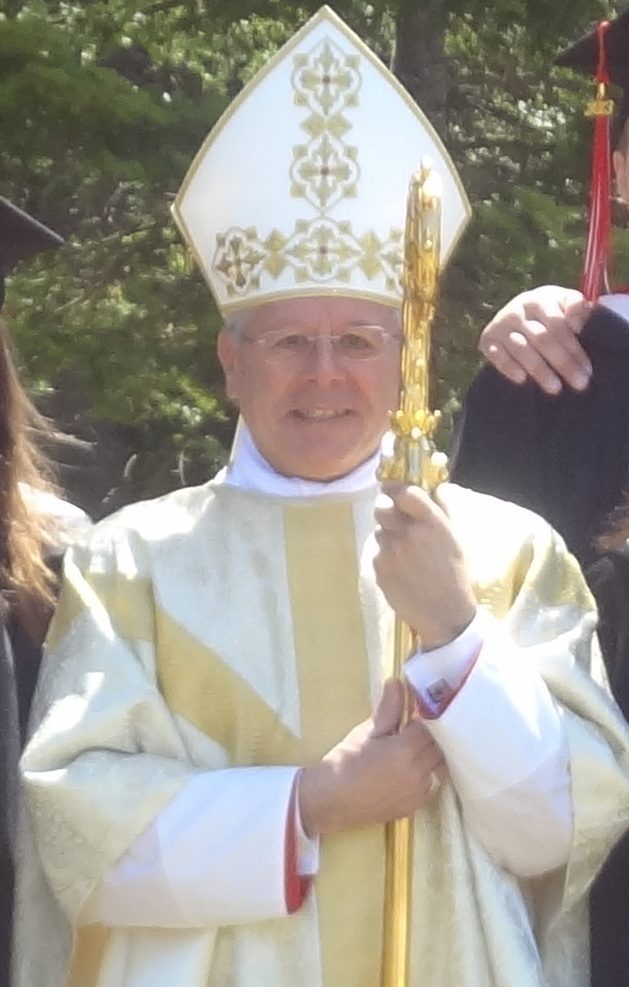
Bishop Libasci (2013)

=== Bishops of Manchester ===
1. Denis Mary Bradley (1884–1903)
2. John Bernard Delany (1904–1906)
3. George Albert Guertin (1907–1931)
4. John Bertram Peterson (1932–1944)
5. Matthew Francis Brady (1945–1959)
6. Ernest John Primeau (1960–1975)
7. Odore Joseph Gendron (1975–1990)
8. Leo Edward O'Neil (1990–1997; coadjutor bishop 1989–1990)
9. John Brendan McCormack (1998–2011)
10. Peter Anthony Libasci (2011–present)

=== Auxiliary bishops ===
- Robert Edward Mulvee (1977–1985), appointed Bishop of Wilmington and later Coadjutor Bishop of Providence, subsequently succeeding to bishop
- Joseph John Gerry, O.S.B. (1986–1989), appointed Bishop of Portland
- Francis Joseph Christian (1996–2018)

=== Other diocesan priests who became bishop ===
Thomas Michael O'Leary, appointed Bishop of Springfield in Massachusetts in 1921

== Parishes ==
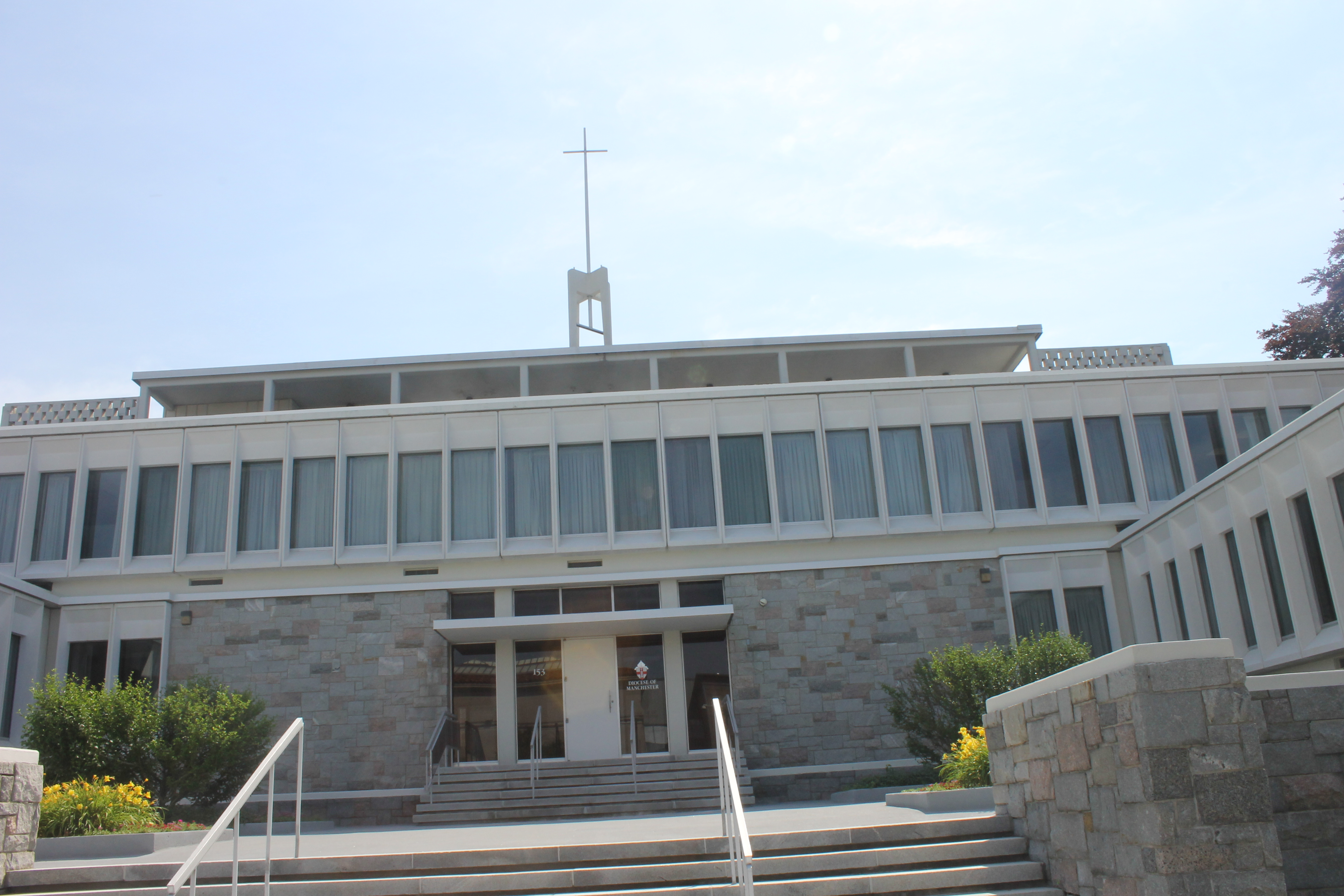
Offices of the Diocese of Manchester (2014)

== Catholic education ==
As of 2026, the Diocese of Manchester had six high schools, one middle school and 17 elementary schools.

=== High schools ===
- Bishop Brady High School – Concord
- Bishop Guertin High School – Nashua
- Holy Family Academy* – Manchester
- Mount Royal Academy – Sunapee
- St. Thomas Aquinas High School – Dover
- Trinity High School – Manchester

=== Colleges ===
- Rivier University – Nashua
- Saint Anselm College – Goffstown
- Thomas More College of Liberal Arts – Merrimack
