= Odore Joseph Gendron =

American Catholic bishop (1921–2020)

His Excellency, The Most Reverend Odore Joseph Gendron
- Bishop of Manchester
- Church: Roman Catholic Church
- Archdiocese: Boston
- Diocese: Manchester
- Appointed: December 12, 1974
- Installed: February 3, 1975
- Term ended: June 12, 1990
- Predecessor: Ernest John Primeau
- Successor: Leo Edward O'Neil

Orders
- Ordination: May 31, 1947 by Matthew Francis Brady
- Consecration: February 3, 1975 by Ernest John Primeau, Edward Cornelius O'Leary, and Timothy Joseph Harrington

Personal details
- Born: September 13, 1921 Manchester, New Hampshire, U.S.
- Died: October 16, 2020 (aged 99) Manchester
- Education: St. Charles Borromeo Seminary; St. Paul Seminary
- Motto: Unity and charity

Styles of Odore Joseph Gendron
- Reference style: His Excellency; The Most Reverend
- Spoken style: Your Excellency
- Religious style: Bishop

Odore Joseph Gendron (September 13, 1921 – October 16, 2020) was an American prelate of the Roman Catholic Church. He served as bishop of the Diocese of Manchester in New Hampshire from 1975 to 1990.

== Biography ==
=== Early life ===
Gendron was born on September 13, 1921, in Manchester, New Hampshire, to Franco-Americans Francis and Valida (née Rouleau) Gendron. He attended Sacred Heart School in Manchester and continued his education in Canada, where he studied at St. Charles Borromeo Seminary in Sherbrooke, Quebec. From 1942 to 1947, he studied philosophy and theology at St. Paul Seminary in Ottawa, Ontario.

=== Priesthood ===
Gendron was ordained to the priesthood at the Cathedral of Saint Joseph in Manchester for the Diocese of Manchester by Bishop Matthew Brady on May 31, 1947.

Following his ordination, Gendron served as associate pastor at Angel Guardian Parish in Berlin, New Hampshire, until 1952, and then at Sacred Heart Parish in Lebanon, New Hampshire (1952–1960), and St. Louis Church in Nashua, New Hampshire (1960–1965). From 1965 to 1967, Gendron was pastor of Our Lady of Lourdes Parish in Pittsfield, New Hampshire. He then served at St. Augustin Parish in Manchester until 1972, when he was named the first episcopal vicar for women religious. Gendron was raised by the Vatican to the rank of honorary prelate in December 1970, and became vicar for clergy for the diocese in January 1974.

=== Bishop of Manchester ===
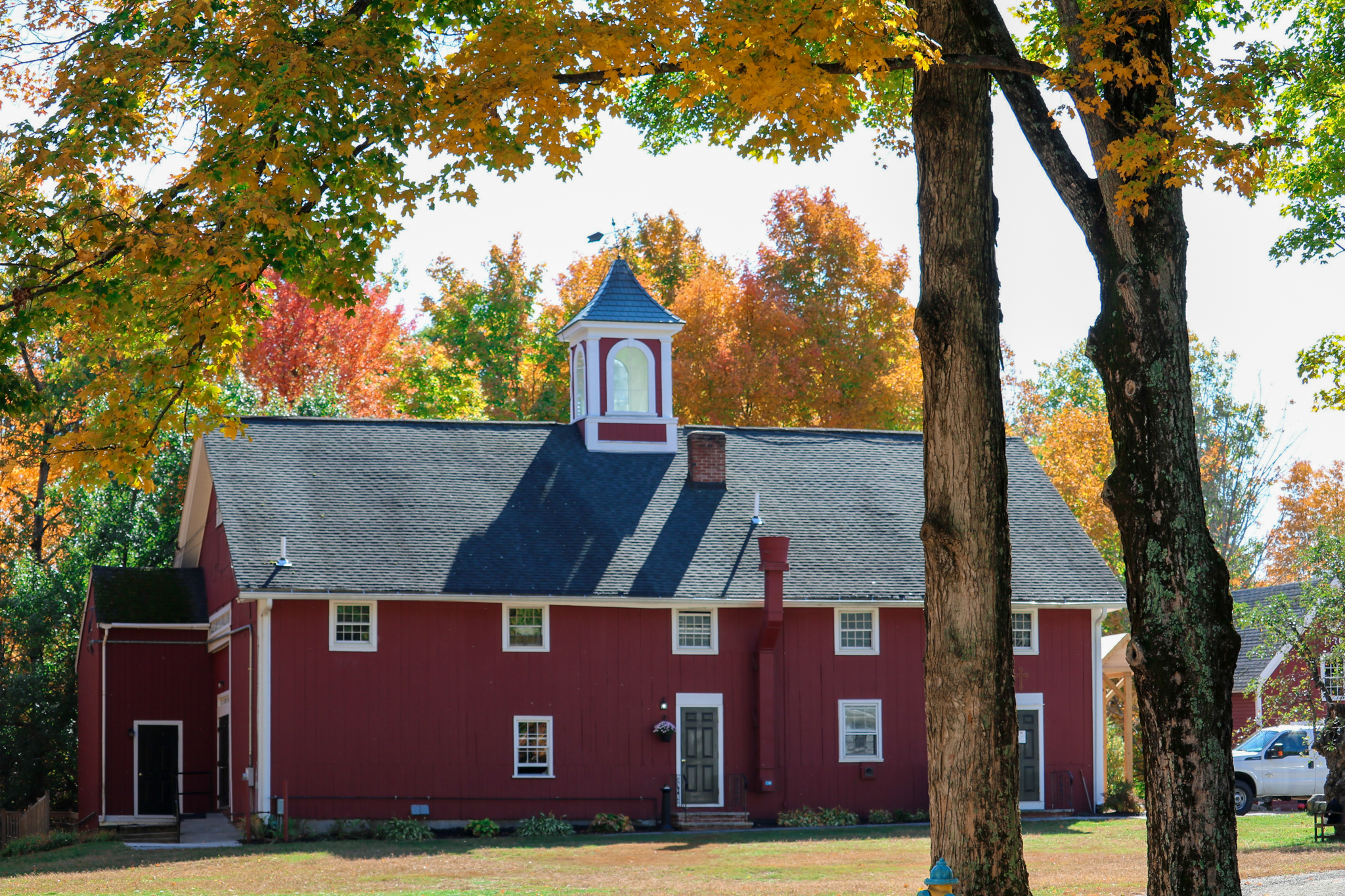
Thomas More College of Liberal Arts, Merrimack, New Hampshire (2020)

On December 12, 1974, Gendron was appointed the seventh bishop of Manchester by Pope Paul VI. He received his episcopal consecration at the Cathedral of Saint Joseph on February 3, 1975, from Bishop Ernest Primeau, with Bishops Edward O'Leary and Timothy Harrington serving as co-consecrators.

Continuing the implementation of the Second Vatican Council's reforms begun under Bishop Primeau, Gendron established a permanent diaconate and joined the New Hampshire Council of Churches. He also established Magdalen College in Bedford, New Hampshire and Thomas More College of Liberal Arts in Merrimack, New Hampshire. Additionally, he served as honorary president of Notre Dame College in Manchester.

=== Retirement and legacy ===
After fifteen years as bishop, Gendron submitted his letter of resignation to Pope John Paul II on June 12, 1990. He was succeeded by Coadjutor Bishop Leo O'Neil.

Court papers released in January 2003 showed that Gendron destroyed records of sexual abuse by two different priests during the 1980s. The first instance was in 1986 for Reverend Philip Petit, a diocese priest who molested a teenager between 1979 and 1981. Petit left the priesthood in 1986 and Gendron destroyed all of his treatment records at Petit's request. The instance was in 1989, when the Servants of the Paraclete treatment facility in New Mexico requested that Gendron destroy the treatment records of Reverend Gordon MacRae, a diocese priest who had been treated at the facility. In 1994, McRae was sentenced to 33 to 67 years in state prison for molesting children.

In a 2003 report by the New Hampshire Attorney General, it was revealed that Gendron helped a priest accused of sexual abuse avoid criminal charges. In 1975, police in Nashua, New Hampshire arrested Reverend Paul Aube, a diocese priest, after finding him with a boy in a car, both with their pants down. Aube, who had confessed to acts of sexual abuse in 1972, confessed his guilt to Gendron. He asked Gendron to send him for treatment and relieve him of parish duties. Instead, Gendron called the Nashua police chief to drop charges against Aube. Gendron then transferred Aube to a parish in Rochester, New Hampshire. In 1981, the mother of a 15-year-old boy discovered Aube having sex with him in the church rectory. When advised of the new allegation, Gendron did not report Aube to the police. In 2002, Aube turned himself into state authorities and became a cooperating witness.

=== Death ===
Odore Gendron died in Manchester on October 16, 2020, at age 99. At the time of his death, he was the oldest living Catholic bishop in the United States.

== See also ==
- Catholic Church hierarchy
- Catholic Church in the United States
- Historical list of the Catholic bishops of the United States
- List of Catholic bishops of the United States
- Lists of patriarchs, archbishops, and bishops

== Episcopal succession ==
Catholic Church titles
Preceded by Ernest John Primeau	Bishop of Manchester; 1975–1990	Succeeded by Leo Edward O'Neil
