= Peter Anthony Libasci =

Catholic bishop (born 1951)

His Excellency, The Most Reverend Peter Anthony Libasci
- Bishop of Manchester
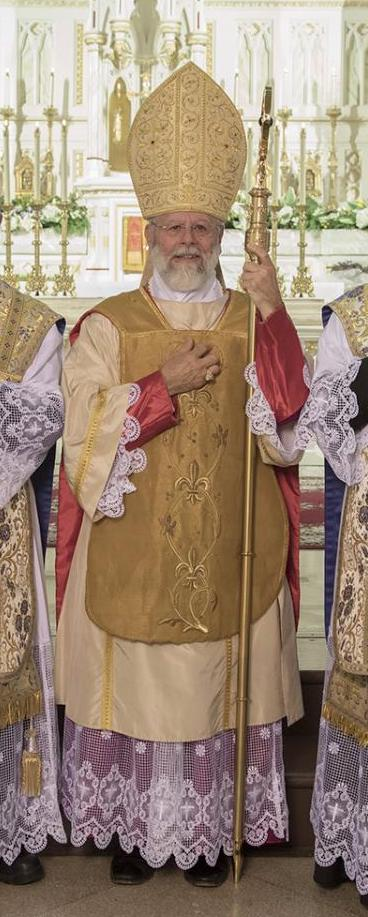
- Diocese: Diocese of Manchester
- Appointed: September 19, 2011
- Installed: December 8, 2011
- Predecessor: John Brendan McCormack
- Previous post: Auxiliary Bishop of Rockville Centre and Titular Bishop of Satafis (2007-2011)

Orders
- Ordination: April 1, 1978 by John R. McGann
- Consecration: June 1, 2007 by William Murphy, Emil Aloysius Wcela, Paul Henry Walsh and John Charles Dunne

Personal details
- Born: November 9, 1951 (age 74) Jackson Heights, Queens, New York, US
- Education: St. John's University; Saint Meinrad School of Theology
- Motto: Arise and walk

Styles of Peter Anthony Libasci
- Reference style: His Excellency; The Most Reverend
- Spoken style: Your Excellency
- Religious style: Bishop

Peter Anthony Libasci (born November 9, 1951) is an American Catholic prelate who has served as Bishop of Manchester in New Hampshire since 2011. Libasci previously served as an auxiliary bishop in the Diocese of Rockville Centre in New York from 2007 to 2011.

Libasci is a bi-ritual priest, allowed to celebrate liturgy and administer the sacraments in both the Latin Church and the Ruthenian Greek Catholic Church.

== Biography ==
=== Early life and education ===
Peter A. Libasci was born on November 9, 1951, in Jackson Heights, Queens, New York. Libasci is of Italian (Sicilian) heritage on his paternal side and of Slovak heritage on his maternal side. He attended St. Margaret School in Middle Village, New York. Deciding to become a priest, Libasci then entered Cathedral Preparatory Seminary in Elmhurst, Queens.

Libasci obtained a Bachelor of Arts degree in philosophy from St. John's University in Queens and a Master of Divinity degree from Saint Meinrad School of Theology in Saint Meinrad, Indiana. After his ordination, Libasci received a Master of Theology-Catechetical Ministry degree from St. John's.

=== Ordination and ministry ===
On April 1, 1978, Libasci was ordained a priest by Bishop John Raymond McGann for the Diocese of Rockville Centre at Saint Agnes Cathedral in Rockville Centre, New York. After his ordination, the diocese assigned Libasci to the following parish assignments in New York:

- Parochial vicar at Saint Raymond's in East Rockaway (1978 – 1982),
- Parochial vicar at Saints Cyril and Methodius in Deer Park (1982 – 1988);
- Parish administrator and then pastor at Our Lady of Good Counsel in Inwood (1988 – 2000)
- Pastor at Saint Therese of Lisieux in Montauk (2000 – 2007)

On December 10, 2004, Libasci was named honorary prelate by Pope John Paul II with the title of monsignor.

=== Auxiliary Bishop of Rockville Centre ===
Libasci was named titular bishop of Satafis and auxiliary bishop of Rockville Centre on April 3, 2007, by Pope Benedict XVI. Libasci received his episcopal consecration on June 1, 2007, from Bishop William Murphy, with Auxiliary Bishops Emil Wcela, Paul Walsh and John Dunne serving as co-consecrators.

As auxiliary bishop, Libasci served as episcopal vicar for the Vicariate East (Suffolk County) of the diocese. He also celebrated the liturgy for the Ruthenian Catholic community, which celebrates liturgy in the Byzantine rite.

=== Bishop of Manchester ===
On September 19, 2011, Benedict XVI named Libasci as the tenth bishop of Manchester. He was installed on December 8, 2011.

Libasci on May 30, 2019, expressed his approval of the override vote in the New Hampshire Senate to eliminate capital punishment in the state.

As bishop, Libasci has been sympathetic to Traditional Catholic groups. In 2016 Libasci invited the Priestly Fraternity of Saint Peter, who exclusively celebrate the Tridentine Mass, to establish St. Stanislaus Parish in Nashua. In 2021 Libasci invited the Institute of the Good Shepherd, which also solely celebrates the Tridentine Mass, to establish a parish in Winchester.

=== Sexual abuse allegations ===
On July 22, 2021, Libasci was named in a lawsuit accusing him of child molestation. The crimes allegedly occurred between 1983 and 1984 when he was serving as parochial vicar at Saints Cyril and Methodius Parish School in New York. The accuser was Charles O’Connor, then 12 or 13 years old. O'Connor said that Libasci fondled his genitals on "numerous occasions", including one instance when the boy was setting up the altar for mass. The lawsuit also named the Sisters of St. Joseph, the religious order running the school at the time, of neglecting to prevent the abuse. Libasci denied the accusations.

On August 29, 2021, the Archdiocese of Boston announced a formal investigation into the accusations against Libasci. However, the archdiocese decided to delay the investigation until the O'Connor lawsuit was settled. O'Connor died in July 2024, leaving the lawsuit in temporary limbo.

On Friday, October 31, 2025, the lawsuit was dismissed with prejudice.

== See also ==
- Catholic Church hierarchy
- Catholic Church in the United States
- Historical list of the Catholic bishops of the United States
- List of Catholic bishops of the United States
- Lists of patriarchs, archbishops, and bishops

== Episcopal succession ==
Catholic Church titles
Preceded by John Brendan McCormack	Bishop of Manchester; 2011–present	Incumbent
Preceded by –	Auxiliary Bishop of Rockville Centre; 2007-2011	Succeeded by –
