= Ernest John Primeau =

American prelate

His Excellency, The Most Reverend Ernest John Primeau
- Bishop of Manchester
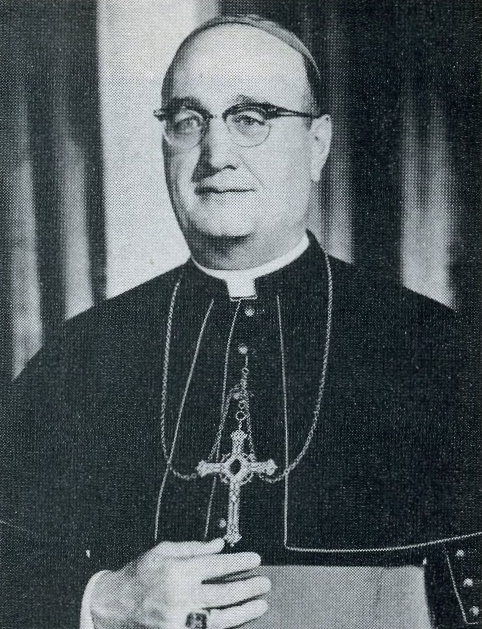
- Church: Roman Catholic
- Diocese: Manchester
- In office: February 13, 1960 to January 30, 1974
- Predecessor: Matthew Francis Brady
- Successor: Odore Joseph Gendron

Orders
- Ordination: April 7, 1934 by George Mundelein
- Consecration: February 13, 1960 by Albert Gregory Meyer

Personal details
- Born: September 17, 1909 Chicago, Illinois, US
- Died: Manchester, New Hampshire, US
- Motto: Veritas unitas pax (Truth, unity, peace)

Ernest John Primeau (September 17, 1909 – June 6, 1989) was an American prelate of the Roman Catholic Church. He served as bishop of the Diocese of Manchester in New Hampshire from 1960 to 1974.

== Biography ==
=== Early life ===
Primeau was born in Chicago, Illinois, on September 17, 1909. He studied at Archbishop Quigley Preparatory Seminary in Chicago. He was ordained to the priesthood for the Archdiocese of Chicago by Cardinal George Mundelein on April 7, 1934. After serving at parishes and schools in the archdiocese, he spent twelve years in Rome. On his return to Chicago, he was named rector of Mundelein Seminary. In 1958, Primeau was named pastor of Our Lady of Mount Carmel Parish in Chicago.

=== Bishop of Manchester ===
On November 27, 1959, Primeau was appointed the sixth bishop of the Diocese of Manchester by Pope John XXIII. He received his episcopal consecration at Holy Name Cathedral in Chicago on February 13, 1960, from Cardinal Albert Meyer, with Bishops Martin McNamara and Raymond Hillinger serving as co-consecrators. He was installed at Cathedral of St. Joseph in Manchester on March 15, 1960.

During the Second Vatican Council in Rome (1962–1965), Primeau was one of the more influential and articulate voices among the Council Fathers. He spoke out in support of the empowerment of the laity, once declaring, "Let this talk of their duty of subjection cease." He also founded the first foreign mission of the diocese in 1963 in Cartago, Colombia. During Primeau's tenure, the number of Catholics increased by 43,000 and the number of parishes by 11; however, weekly mass attendance declined from over 70% to below 50%.

=== Retirement and legacy ===
On January 30, 1974, Pope Paul VI accepted Primeau's resignation as bishop of Manchester at age 65. He had often advocated that bishops should retire at that age and so he became the first bishop of Manchester to resign from office. Ernest Primeau died on June 6, 1989, at age 79.

In 2004, Reverend Leo Landry, a priest convicted of sexually abusing minors, described a meeting that he had with Primeau in 1967. A woman had complained to Primeau that Landry had been seen having sex with her 13-year-old son at the family's lakeside camp in Milton, New Hampshire. Primeau summoned Landry to a meeting, in which Landry confessed his guilt. Primeau told him to stay away from the boy and write a letter of apology to the family. According to Landry, he never wrote the letter and Primeau never reported him to authorities or removed him from ministry.

Catholic Church titles
| Preceded by Matthew Francis Brady | Bishop of Manchester; 1960–1974 | Succeeded by Odore Joseph Gendron |
