= Matthew Francis Brady =

American prelate

His Excellency, The Most Reverend Matthew Francis Brady
- Bishop of Manchester
- Church: Roman Catholic Church
- See: Diocese of Manchester
- In office: November 11, 1944–September 20, 1959
- Predecessor: John Bertram Peterson
- Successor: Ernest John Primeau
- Previous post: Bishop of Burlington (1938-1944)

Orders
- Ordination: June 10, 1916 by John Joseph Nilan
- Consecration: October 26, 1938 by Amleto Giovanni Cicognani

Personal details
- Born: January 15, 1893 Waterbury, Connecticut, US
- Died: September 20, 1959 (aged 66) Manchester, New Hampshire, US
- Education: American College of the Immaculate Conception; St. Bernard's Seminary
- Motto: Regnet Christus (May Christ reign)
- Coat of arms

Matthew Francis Brady (January 15, 1893 – September 20, 1959) was an American prelate of the Roman Catholic Church. He served as bishop of the Diocese of Burlington in Vermont (1938–1944) and bishop of the Diocese of Manchester in New Hampshire (1944–1959).

== Biography ==
=== Early life ===
Matthew Brady was born on January 15, 1893, in Waterbury, Connecticut, to John and Catherine (née Caffrey) Brady. After attending St. Thomas Seminary in Hartford, Connecticut, he studied at the American College of the Immaculate Conception in Leuven, Belgium. Returning to the United States, Brady entered St. Bernard's Seminary in Rochester, New York.

=== Priesthood ===
Brady was ordained to the priesthood in Hartford for the Diocese of Hartford by Bishop John Nilan in Hartford on June 10, 1916. After the American entry into World War I in 1917, Brady served as a chaplain in the United States Army from 1916 to 1918. After his discharge from the army, he did pastoral work in the Diocese of Hartford, and served as a professor at St. Thomas Seminary in Bloomfield, Connecticut, from 1922 to 1932.

=== Bishop of Burlington ===
Coat of arms as bishop of Burlington

On July 30, 1938, Brady was appointed the fourth bishop of Burlington by Pope Pius XI. He received his episcopal consecration on October 26, 1938, from Archbishop Amleto Cicognani, with Bishops Maurice F. McAuliffe and Joseph McCarthy serving as co-consecrators, at the Cathedral of the Immaculate Conception in Burlington, Vermont.

Brady organized branches in his diocese of the Boy Scouts of America and the Catholic Youth Organization, and erected about a dozen new parishes in Fairfax, Gilman, North Troy, Orleans, and South Burlington, all in Vermont.

=== Bishop of Manchester ===
On January 17, 1945, Brady was installed as the fifth bishop of Manchester. He presided over a period of unprecedented growth in the diocese, founding 27 parishes in 11 years and authorizing the construction of nearly 50 churches and numerous schools, convents, and other facilities. The number of parishioners increased by 50,000, and the number of priests and religious from around 650 to over 1,600. For all these accomplishments he was nicknamed "Brady the Builder."

=== Death and legacy ===
Matthew Brady died in Manchester on September 20, 1959, at age 66. Bishop Brady High School in Concord, New Hampshire, and Brady Hall at Saint Anselm College in Goffstown, New Hampshire, are named in his honor.

Catholic Church titles
Preceded by Joseph John Rice	Bishop of Burlington; 1938–1944	Succeeded by Edward Francis Ryan
Preceded by John Bertram Peterson	Bishop of Manchester; 1944–1959	Succeeded by Ernest John Primeau
