= Cathedral of St. Joseph (Manchester, New Hampshire) =

St. Joseph Cathedral
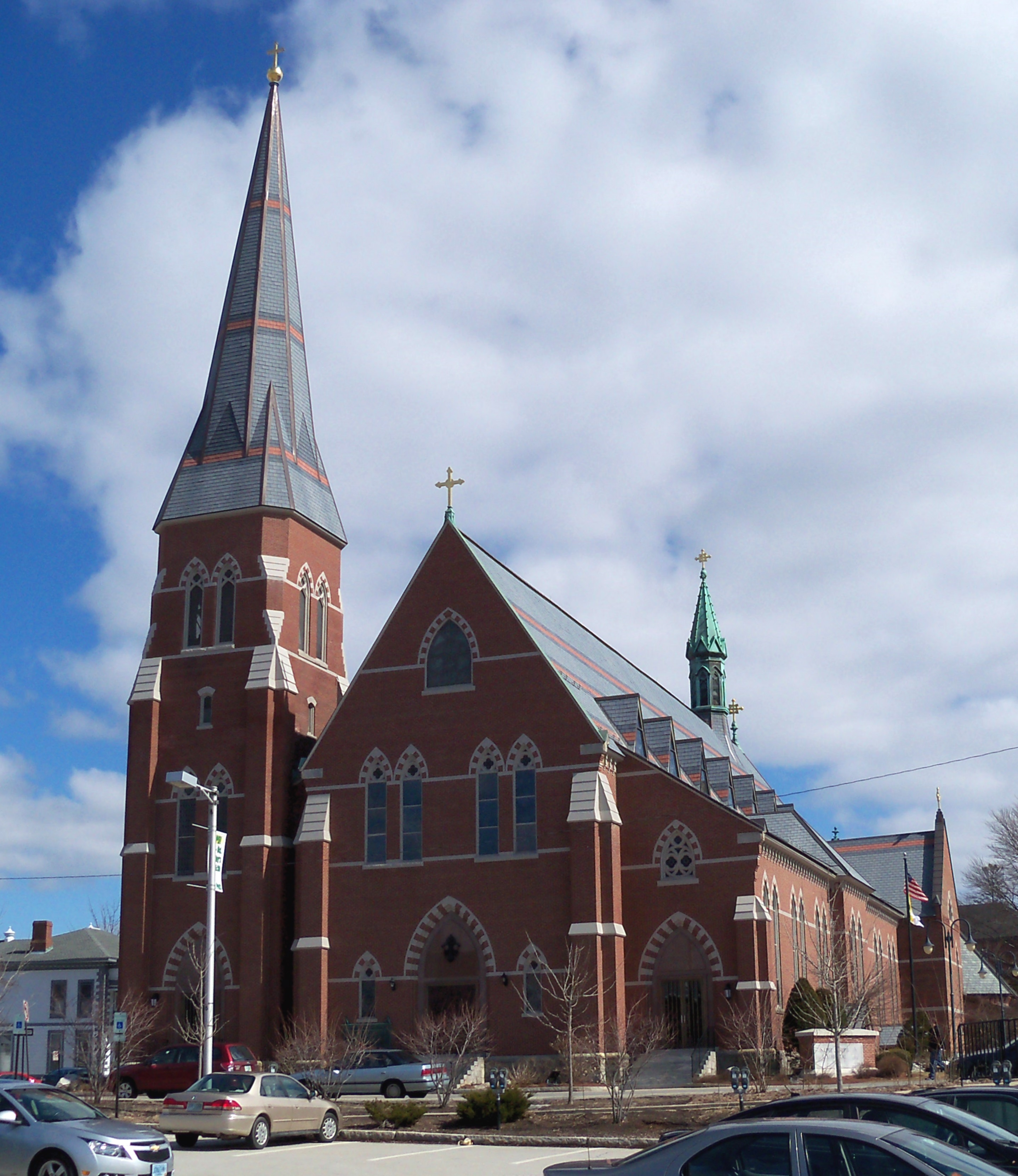
- St. Joseph Cathedral
- 42°59′36″N 71°27′32″W
- Location: 145 Lowell Street; Manchester, New Hampshire
- Country: United States
- Denomination: Roman Catholic
- Website: www.stjosephcathedralnh.org

History
- Founded: 1869
- Dedication: Diocese founded 1884
- Consecrated: 16 April 1894

Architecture
- Architect: Patrick C. Keeley (1816-1896)
- Construction cost: $100,000

Administration
- Province: Ecclesiastical Province of Boston
- Diocese: Diocese of Manchester
- Deanery: Amoskeag

Clergy
- Bishop: Most Rev. Peter Anthony Libasci
- Rector: Very Reverend Jason Y. Jalbert
- Dean: Very Rev. Christopher Martel

The Cathedral of St. Joseph is the cathedral church of the Roman Catholic Diocese of Manchester in New Hampshire, United States. It is located at 145 Lowell Street in the downtown district. Bishop Peter Libasci serves as Bishop of the Diocese of Manchester, and Father Jason Jalbert is the rector of the cathedral parish.

== History ==
The church was founded in 1869 to serve the needs of Irish immigrants. Pope Leo XIII established the Diocese of Manchester in 1884, and St. Joseph's parish became the cathedral that same year. The building has undergone several renovations and expansions since.

In 1968, the high altar, Stations of the Cross, and many other decorations were removed according to the fashion popular after the Second Vatican Council. The diocese began another renovation in 2014 to install similar pieces removed from Holy Trinity Church in Boston after it closed.

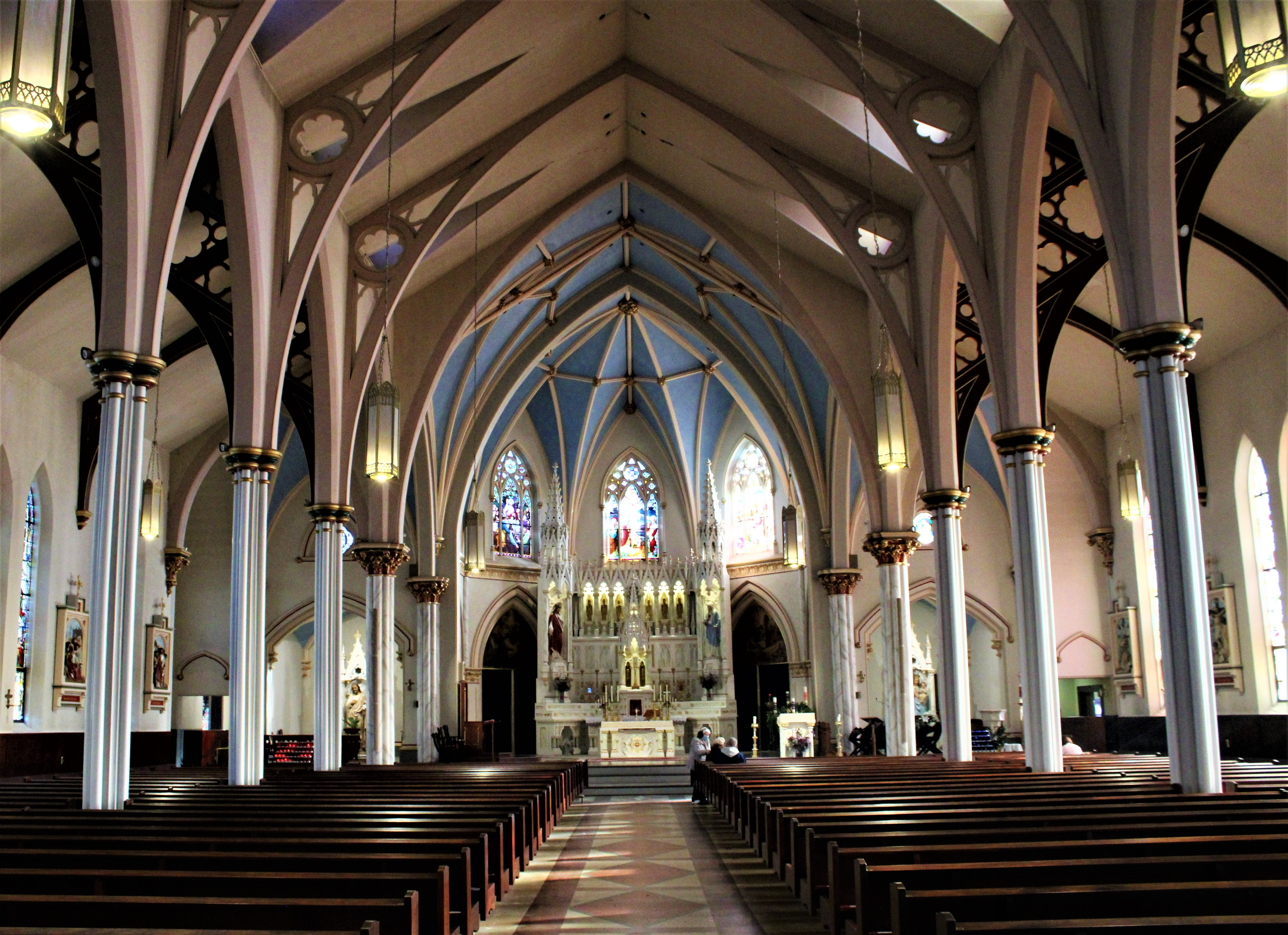
Cathedral interior

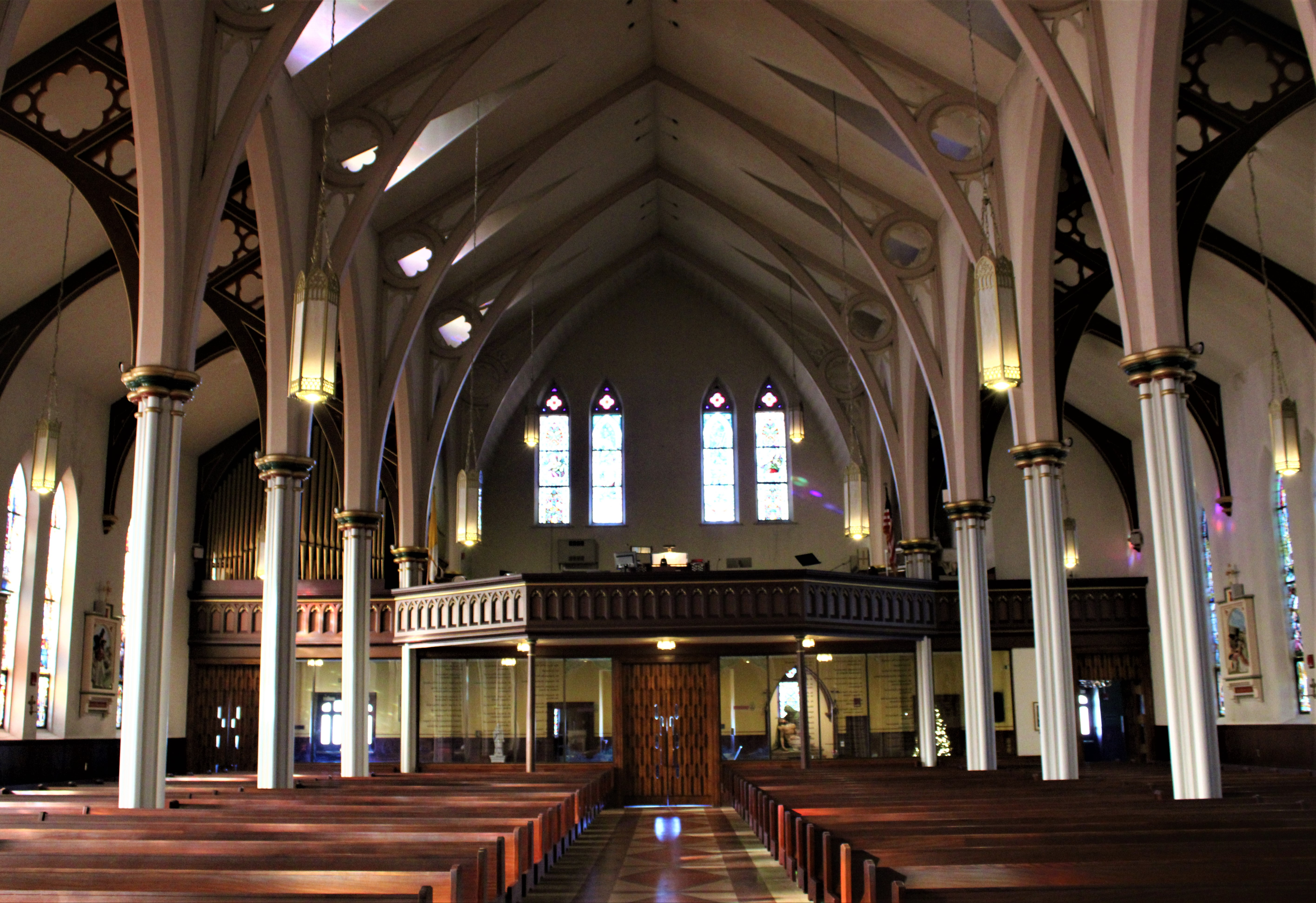
Rear gallery

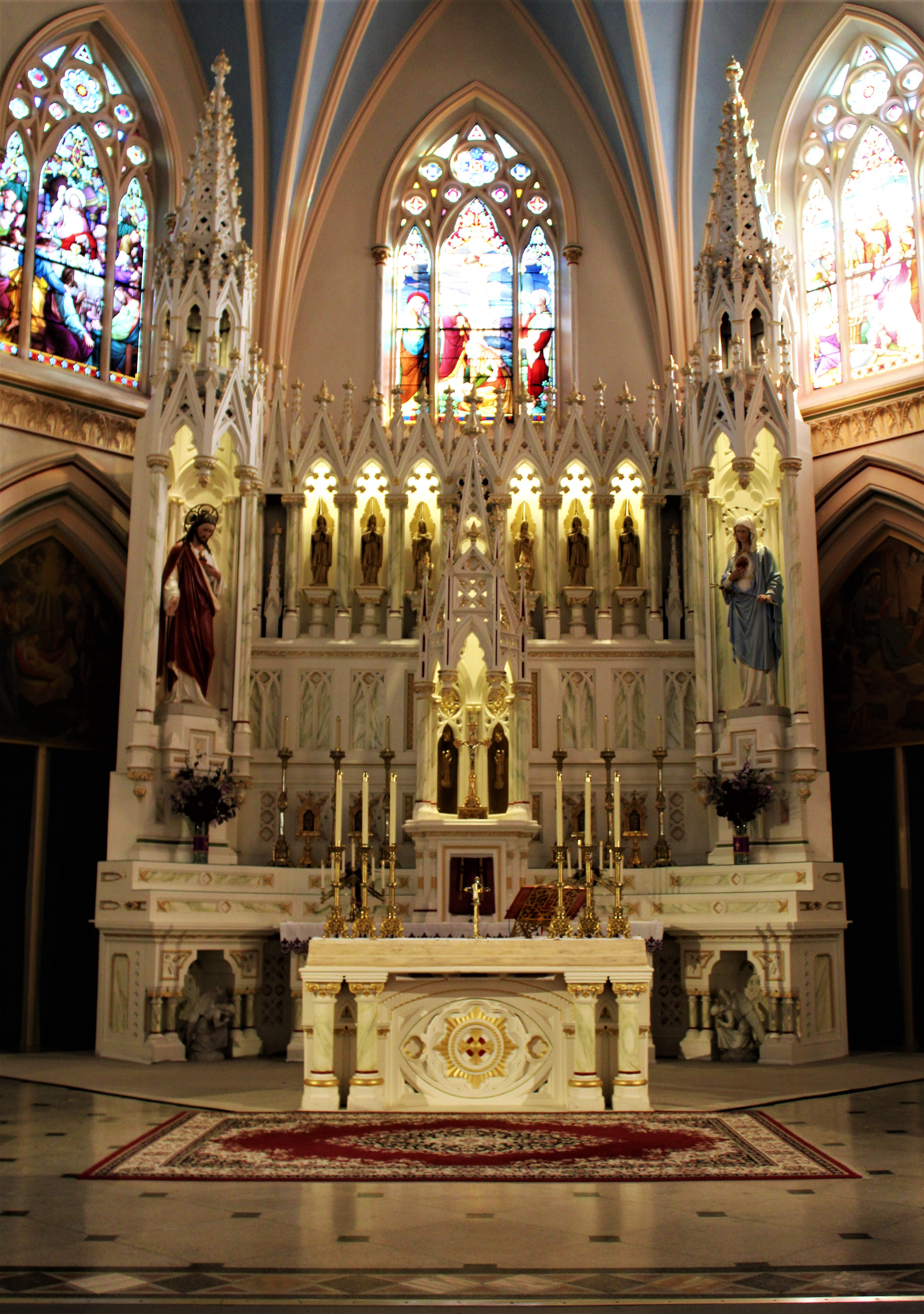
Altar

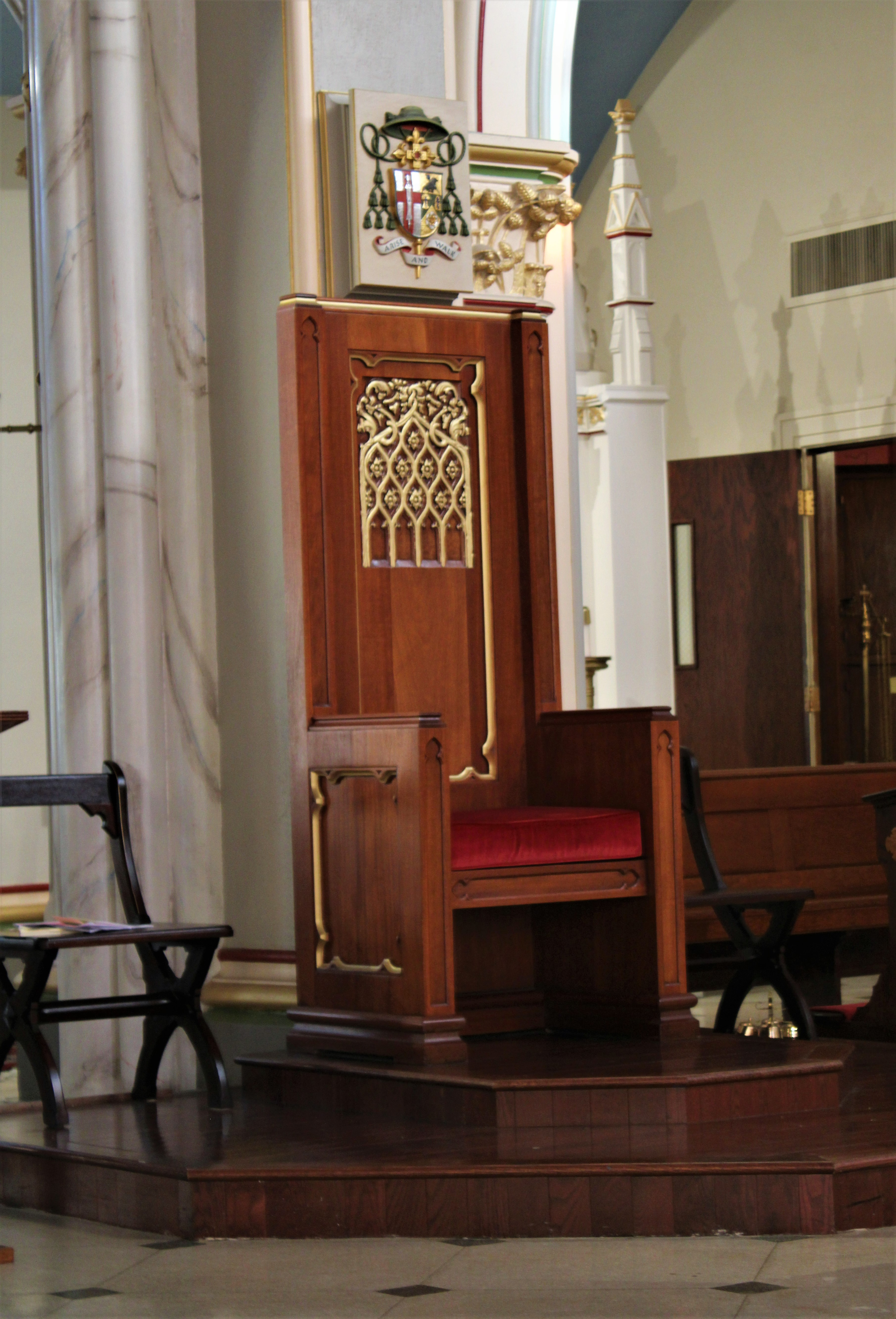
Cathedra (bishop's throne)

== See also ==
- List of Catholic cathedrals in the United States
- List of cathedrals in the United States
