= History of St. Mary's Church (Dedham, Massachusetts) =

The history of St. Mary's Church in Dedham, Massachusetts begins with the first mass said in Dedham, Massachusetts in 1843 and runs to the present day.

From the first mass with only eight Catholics present, St. Mary's grew into one of the largest parishes in the Archdiocese of Boston. The first church constructed by the congregation was quickly outgrown, and so a second church was built on High Street. Designed to be a "cathedral in the wilderness," it is "the largest and most imposing church in the town" and "one of the most conspicuous edifices" in the town.

Several parishes have grown out of St. Mary's, most recently St. Susanna's. Today it has a large Life Teen program, and over 40 other programs for parishioners.

== Early history ==
=== First Catholics ===
The history of Catholicism in Dedham begins in 1758, 120 years after the settlement of the Contentment Plantation and two decades before the American Revolution. During the French and Indian War, the British expelled over 11,000 Acadians from what is today Nova Scotia. Eleven of them resettled in Dedham, and though the town and the Massachusetts Bay colony were both officially Congregationalist, they were allowed to reside here as "French neutrals" until they returned to Canada in 1760.

After the Acadians returned to Canada in 1760, Dedham would not see another Catholic resident for decades. The townsfolk would not always be so welcoming. When an Irishman and his wife came to visit friends in the village of Dedham, the Selectmen asked them to leave as soon as possible.

The first Catholic who spent any length of time in Dedham was a Mr. Gill, who lived in what is today known as Riverdale, but was then called Dedham Island. The first few Catholics who lived in Dedham would have to travel 16 miles to St. Joseph's in Roxbury, the Cathedral of the Holy Cross on Franklin Street in Boston, or to St. Mary's in Waltham to attend Mass.

=== Early Masses ===
By the early 1800s, a few Catholics had settled in Dedham. The first Mass in Dedham was celebrated in Sunday, May 15, 1843, in the home of Daniel Slattery, (Note: Slattery was born in Ireland in 1805 and moved to Dedham while still young. He married Catherine Doggett of Dedham on April 14, 1837 at the Cathedral of the Holy Cross.) with eight Catholics present. (Note: While the Slattery home is still standing, at the corner of Washington and Worthington Streets, at the time it was on the corner of Washington and High, where the Police Station sits in 2016. During the Revolution, the Worthington Street land was the site of an encampment for French troops under the command of Count Rochambeau. The home's original location was first owned by Daniel Morse and then became the homestead of John Hunting, the first ruling elder of the First Church and Parish in Dedham in 1638. Slattery purchased it from Martin Marsh.) An altar was set up by the window. At the time, Dedham and the surrounding area was part of the missionary territory of St. Mary's in Waltham. Though a large area, stretching as far west as Concord and as far south as Walpole, it is estimated there were fewer than 300 Catholics.

It was difficult for many to travel to Waltham, and so Strain offered to travel halfway to meet the Catholics in the outlying areas. Slattery offered his home and to provide Strain with transportation. For the next three years Slattery's 17-year-old brother-in-law, John Doggett, would bring Father James Strain from Waltham and back to minister to the needs of the small congregation. (Note: Some sources Strain came weekly while others say monthly.) (Note: Father Strain was born in Ireland in 1815, and was received into the Diocese of Boston in 1840. He had a rather tumultuous career here, and bounced around not only from parish to parish, but even to several other dioceses, before eventually returning to Ireland in 1850.)

By 1846, the Catholic community in Dedham was established enough that the town became part of the mission of St. Joseph's Church in Roxbury. The geographic boundaries of the town were much larger at the time, however, and only one Catholic boy lived in the central village in 1850. Fr. Patrick O'Beirne continued to say mass in the Slattery home.

Slattery was well regarded among his fellow Dedhamites and, when his wife died in 1849, the hands of the clock were stopped at the hour of her death. (Note: Slattery "was well educated, had a practical knowledge of agriculture," according to Dedham Historical Society librarian and archivist Sandra Waxman. He was well educated, held "considerable property" and had a "splendid education and a wide knowledge of Arbor culture." He also set out many of the trees in Dedham.) The unusual occurrence of a Catholic funeral mass elicited much interest around the town.

Slattery moved to Needham in 1854. This, plus the flood of Irish immigrants escaping the Great Famine necessitated holding Mass in the Temperance Hall, often by Father Patrick O'Beirne. Mass was also occasionally celebrated in the Crystal Palace on Washington Street. Worshipers came from Dedham, South Dedham, West Dedham, and West Roxbury. Ordained for less than a decade, the 33-year-old O'Beirne had charge of the Catholics in Dedham, Norwood, Randolph, Holliston, Walpole, and Needham, as well as Roxbury. (Note: The Irish-born O'Beirne had previously served in Vermont, Rhode Island, and Maine, which were then parts of the Diocese of Boston.)

=== First church ===
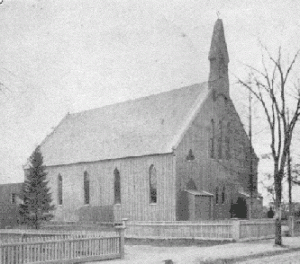
The first St. Mary's Church

The number and devotion of the first parishioners permitted a church to be constructed within 10 years. In 1856 the cornerstone was laid, and in 1857, the first St. Mary's Church was completed on Washington Street between Spruce and Marion Streets. It could seat 700 people.

On Easter Sunday, April 12, 1857, Father O'Beirne said Mass for the first time in a new church that could seat 600. (Note: One source says it was Christmas Day.) Reading from the 20th chapter of John's Gospel, Father O'Beirne proclaimed the news of Jesus' empty tomb.

=== Parish growth ===
The large growth in the number of Catholics in the area in the middle of the 19th century made the original St. Mary's too small. Irish immigrants fleeing the Great Famine in the 1840s, followed by Germans in the 1850s. There was also a considerable number of French Canadians. Italians and Eastern Europeans came later in the century. Many took up residence in East Dedham to work in the mills along Mother Brook. By July 1878, the church was out of repair and it had a mortgage debt of $3,000.

During this time, St. Mary's was responsible for the mission in South Dedham, which later separated and became the Town of Norwood. Like those closer to the center of town, South Dedhamites would travel to either Roxbury or to nearby Canton for Mass, but eventually Mass was offered several times a year in the home of Patrick Fahey. By 1860, a priest was available to say mass in South Dedham every other week.

During the Civil War, the Dedham Transcript wrote that "Almost to a man," the Catholic men of Dedham "answered Lincoln's call," and sadly "no church in Dedham lost so many men in proportion to their numbers as did St. Mary's." Their patriotism and deaths did much to counter the anti-Catholic bias that existed in town. The war put a great strain on O'Beirne's health, and in 1866 Fr. John P. Brennan, O'Beirne's nephew, became the parish's resident pastor.

In 1880, the pastor of St. Mary's was also responsible for churches in South Dedham, East Dedham, and West Roxbury. During this decade, Father Johnson was publicly raising the issue of discrimination against Catholics in the public schools. In 1885, as a member of the School Committee, (Note: Johnson served two terms, from 1884 to 1890.) he claimed the principal of the Avery School ridiculed Catholic students, and several years later had a lengthy debate with a Protestant minister via letters in the Dedham Standard about the "rank misrepresentation of the Catholic Church" in a history book adopted by the School Committee.

In 1890 there were an estimated 2,000 parishioners, including 957 Irish, 250 English-speaking Canadians, 58 French,19 Italians and 1 Portuguese. There were 400 students in the Sunday School classes in 1884.

== Construction of the new church ==
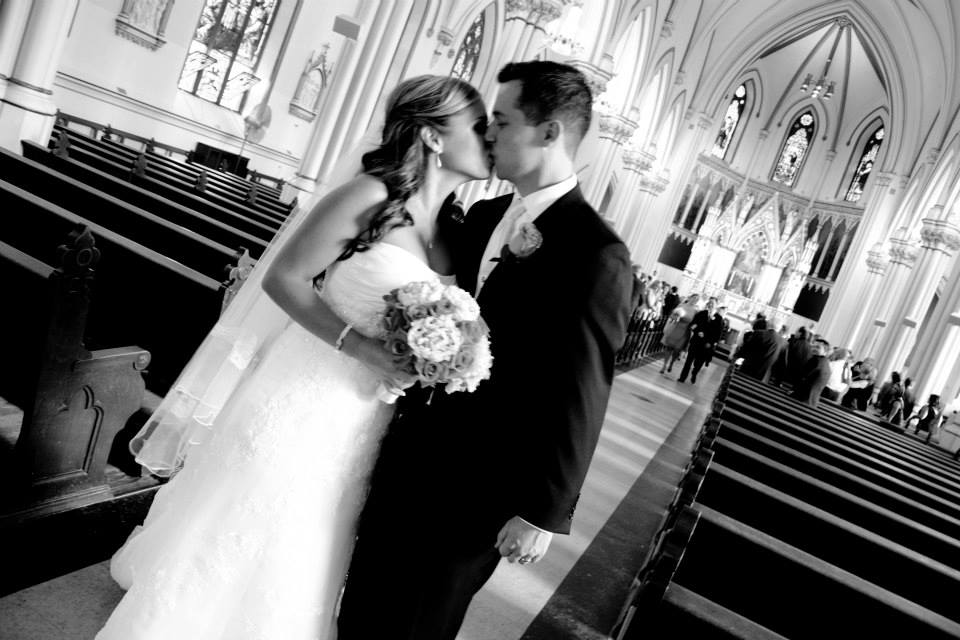
A newly married couple in St. Mary's

In 1867, a house was purchased on High Street by Father John Brennan and was converted into a rectory. Plans were then made for a new church to be constructed at this location. The larger part of the church lot was purchased after Johnson's arrival in 1878. In February 1880, it was announced that Albert W. Nickerson, a Protestant who had business in Boston, had paid off the parish's $800 debt, allowing the congregation to commence work on a new building. This was welcome news, as the parish was bankrupt at the time.

=== Cornerstone ceremony ===
A map from September 1892 showing the "not entirely finished" church and the parochial hall

The cornerstone of the present church was laid at 3:00 on October 17, 1880 by Archbishop John Williams. A crowd of between 4,000 and 5,000 people attended, and special trains were run from Boston and Norwood to accommodate all those who wished to attend. It was one of the largest gatherings in Dedham's history.

The congregation marched from their present building on Washington Street to the site of the new church on the High Street for the ceremony. Included in the procession were the Holy Name Society, the Young Men's Lyceum, the Rosary Society, the Young Ladies Solidarity, the St. Aloysius Society of Boys, and the Children of Sacred and Holy Angels Solidarity.

The crowd included many of the leading citizens of Dedham as well as 30 priests. The clergy included Johnson, St. Mary's pastor, Father Theodore Metcalf of the Cathedral of the Holy Cross who served as Master of Ceremonies, (Note: Theodore Metcalf was a descendant of Michael Metcalf, a signer of the Dedham Covenant. Michael was also a teacher in Dedham, at the first public school in America. Theodore Metcalf preceded Johnson as pastor of Gate of Heaven church.) and Father Joseph Henning of Roxbury who gave a homily. The Cathedral choir sang and Higgins's band provided music, as did the united choirs of Dedham.

Williams blessed the cornerstone and the place where the foundation was to be poured, as well as the white cross that marked the location of the future altar.

=== Construction ===
The current church was constructed next door to the rectory Father Brennan established on High Street. A week before the cornerstone ceremony, on October 10, 1880, a building used as a bath by male parishioners of St. Raphael's in East Dedham was torn down in order to be used as a staging ground for the construction of the new church.

Shortly after construction began, a large about of solid rock was found below the surface which had to be removed. The interior walls were plastered by William B. Gould, an escaped slave who settled in Dedham. One of Gould's employees improperly mixed the plaster and, even though it was not visible by looking at it, Gould insisted that it be removed and reapplied correctly at his own great expense. Another contractor did not complete the work he was hired to do, delaying progress.

The new church was designed by Patrick W. Ford, an architect with offices on School Street in Boston, and built by Welch and Delano. They were charged with hiring 18 Dedham men to complete the basement, as well as a master mechanic to serve as superintendent. Construction began on June 28, 1880, and in 1883 The Dedham Transcript wrote that "The plastering of the new catholic church is nearly finished, the windows put in place, and everything betokens an early occupancy of the basement."

While the upper church was still under construction, the lower church was used for Mass and the upper portion for various fairs and other gatherings. The first mass was said in the lower church at 10:30 a.m. on October 24, 1886. The crowd was overflowing, and included 20 Protestants, many of local importance, and a choir from St. Peter's in South Boston. The church, though "in constant use," would not be completed for another 20 years after the cornerstone was laid.

=== Dedication ===
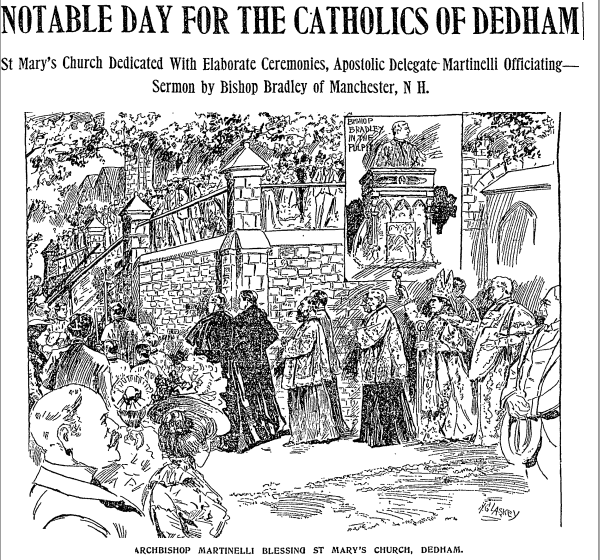
A drawing from page 7 of the September 10, 1900, issue of the Boston Daily Globe depicting the Dedication of St Mary's Church in Dedham, Massachusetts

After 20 years of working, praying, and fundraising from the meager immigrant wages of many of the parishioners, the Upper Church was finally completed. It took so long that another architect had to take over but was, Father Fleming said, "almost too beautiful for ordinary use." One critic said that though some parishes in the area have more people than did the entire town of Dedham, "few parishes in Boston can boast of a more impressive Church" than St. Mary's. Another said it was second to none in the archdiocese.

The upper church was completed and dedicated by Archbishop Williams on September 9, 1900 at 10:00 a.m. In addition to Williams, Archbishop Sebastiano Martinelli, the papal delegate to the United States, attended, as did Bishop Denis Mary Bradley of New Hampshire. The crowd, numbered at 1,200, included the communion class and many prominent citizens of the Town, including Protestants. The dedication packed the church, requiring many to stand, and tickets were required to enter.

The ceremony began with a procession of clergy from the rectory to the church, where a prayer was chanted on the porch at the top of the stairs. The clergy then walked around the building, blessing the walls with holy water. Back on the porch, the litany of the Saints was said before the interior walls were sprinkled with holy water. A final prayer was said in the sanctuary to complete the dedication.

Martinelli then said the first mass in the upper church with a number of clergy from the surrounding areas present. Music was provided by a choir of 30, plus four soloists and part of the Germania Orchestra of Boston.

In his homily, which the Boston Globe published, Bradley said that

Today, my beloved brethren, like unto Solomon on the occasion of the dedication of the Great Temple of Jerusalem, your zealous Pastor proclaims that you have built a house in God's name ... To you has been reserved the privilege of offering to God a house as worthy of His Name as this beautiful structure in which we are assembled this morning.

After Mass, at 4:00, about 200 children were confirmed, and solemn vespers were sung in the evening.

=== Features ===
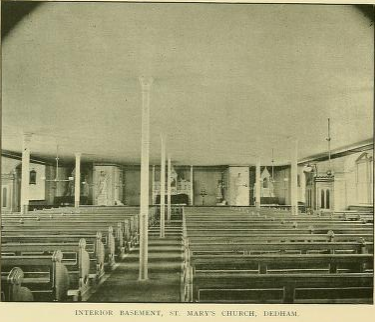
The basement of St. Mary's in 1895

The footprint of the Gothic church, which Father Johnson said was to be a "cathedral in the wilderness," measures 150' long by 65' wide, and the bell tower is 164' tall. The apex of the ceiling is 80' and it has the longest aisle in the Archdiocese of Boston. It was at the time, and remains today, "the largest and most imposing church in the town" and "one of the most conspicuous edifices" in the town.

There are four large doorways facing High Street, and granite buttresses give the church "an appearance of strength and solidarity." The doors, like the pews, were made of polished oak. The altar was carved from Caen stone, and the altar rail of green onyx. Today one of those doors is permanently shut as that portion of the vestibule has become a Reconciliation room, and the altar rail has been moved down to the space in front of the front pew. As built, it had a seating capacity of 1,200 in the vestry and 1,500 in the church proper. An organ sits high above the nave in a choir loft that can hold 50 singers.

The broad front stairs originally pointed out away from the Church with a brass railing in the middle, but due to a widening of High Street in the 1920s they were turned to run parallel with the street. When built, the church was said to be fireproof with "ventilation and heating system of the best, and the acoustic properties unexcelled." The windows are of "rolled cathedral stained glass" and were made by four German companies: Tyrolese Art Glass Company, (Note: Also known in German as the Tiroler Glasmalerei Anstalt.) (Note: The Tyrolese Art Glass Company was a leader in the use of style of composition and painting techniques which became known as the Munich Style, which was very popular at the time.) Franz Mayer of Munich, Franz Xaver Zettler, and Royal Bavarian Stained Glass. Despite being made by different companies, the windows all have similar scales, color ranges, and placement of figures, creating the appearance of a cohesive whole.

Lining the Church are fluted Grecian columns and seven arches. Crystal chandeliers hang along both sides of the nave, above the altar, and above the doors.

The semicircular apse had stained glass windows showing, from left to right, St. Patrick, St. Peter, the Assumption of Mary, St. Paul and St. Brigid. At either end of the altar are statues of Saints Peter and Paul. In between are three paintings framed by elaborate gothic ornamentation on the rerdos.

=== Cost and fundraising ===
After the cornerstone laying, a dinner was held at a local hall where $1,250 was donated. The largest donation of $100 came from Timothy Callahan, and he received a golden trowel for his gift. Fundraisers, including a "grand coffee party" in Memorial Hall, were held for years to come to pay for the edifice and drew people not only from Dedham, but from many surrounding communities. The mills of East Dedham, where many parishioners lived and worked, shut down frequently and for months at a time, putting many out of work and hindering fundraising efforts.

Albert Nickerson, a member of Dedham's St. Paul's Episcopal Church, donated $10,000 towards the effort. (Note: Nickerson was the wealthiest man in Dedham at the time of his death. He was a philanthropist, and donated to several causes in Dedham, including other churches.) The Dedham Granite for the outer walls was donated by another Protestant, John Bullard, who did not live to see the church completed. The granite came from Bullard's own lot. Other non-Catholics also contributed. In 1886, it was estimated the cost would be $100,000, by 1890 the cost was reported to be $125,000, and at the dedication in 1900 it stood at $250,000.

When Johnson left St. Mary's in 1890, he submitted a financial report of the parish before he left. The last time he did so, the church "was simply roofed in." At that time there was a mortgage of $15,000, a floating debt of $2,700, and a debt of $1,500 on St. Raphael's. By the time he left, the basement church was finished, it was plastered, the flooring and pews were installed, and the steps were built. All bills had been paid and all debts retired, except for the $15,000 mortgage and a $2,000 mortgage on the rectory. There was also a mortgage on the old church lot worth $3,000, and Johnson believed the lot was worth more than that. The church also owned "the Storrs lot," which cost $2,250, but was worth more at the time of the report. Johnson himself gave "the last cent that [he] could spare" to the construction of the church.

== 20th century ==
=== Early 20th century ===
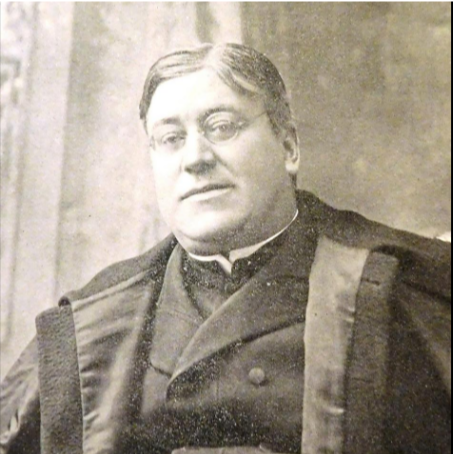
Father John Fleming

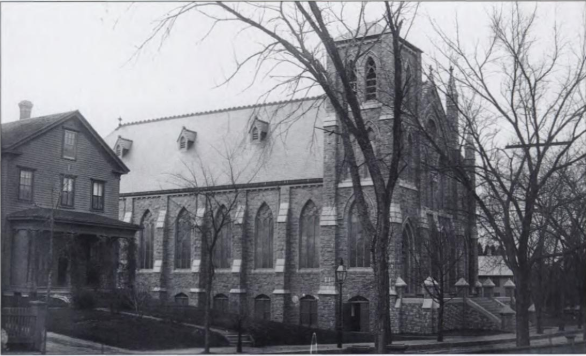
St Mary's Church and original rectory

Father John H. Fleming arrived at St. Mary's in June 1890 and began a 33-year tenure as pastor. During his pastorate the parish the upper church would be completed, the parish cemetery in West Roxbury would be purchased, (Note: In his farewell address, Johnson also spoke of buying a plot of land to be used as a cemetery.) and the old wooden rectory next to the church would be torn down so a new rectory could be built of Dedham Granite in 1913. (Note: Parr has the date as 1915.) On Sundays, however, the quality of his preaching was such that other priests would come to St. Mary's to listen.

The rectory was designed by Edward T. P. Graham and the stone came from the same quarry as the church, which had to be reopened for the purpose. It was donated by General Weld, (Note: One source lists the donor's name as Alfred Rodman.) a Protestant, whose daughter converted to Catholicism and became a nun. He honored her early death with the donation.

In 1901, an unusual double marriage ceremony took place where two sisters, Frances and Mary Curtis, married two men during a single mass. Charles Logue, who built numerous churches in the Greater Boston area as well as Fenway Park, died in the arms of his son while inspecting the roof of St. Mary's in 1919.

In the 1920s, with the building work completed, new pastor Father Henry A. Walsh was able to focus on the various groups and societies within the parish. The Catholic population in the area grew, as did the amount of social activity within the parish. By 1936, the parish was one of the largest in the Archdiocese of Boston with 6,000 parishioners, four priests, and six nuns. The Sunday School alone had over 1,300 pupils.

Within months of arriving as pastor in 1929, Father George P. O'Connor began a parish school with three Sisters of St. Joseph. He also began a Catholic Youth Organization, and was generally regarded as having a focus on youth. He also added an additional floor to the rectory to accommodate the assistant priests coming to the parish.

Father Mark C. Driscoll became pastor in 1943, and two years later became a monsignor. In 1953, Driscoll purchased land at 700 High Street to be used as an adult center. When he celebrated his golden jubilee of his priesthood, Cardinal Francis Spellman returned to Boston and celebrated the Mass. Cardinal Richard Cushing provided the homily.

=== Mid-20th century ===
In 1953, the newly established St. John Chrysostom Church in West Roxbury took some of St. Mary's territory.

Following the reforms the Second Vatican Council, a new temporary altar was installed in the church in 1964, and a permanent oak altar was in place in 1965. Monsignor Edward C. Bailey, who became pastor in 1960, also introduced microphones and speakers into the cavernous church, and remodeled both sacristies. (Note: Baily was born in Waterford City, Ireland and moved to Watertown, Massachusetts at the age of 9. He was ordained in the Archbasilica of St. John Lateran in 1927 and given the title monsignor in 1963.) He also added additional exterior doors to the church.

A new carillon was added in 1962, and the bells pealed the Angelus and the call to worship on Sundays. By the 1990s, however, the bells no longer chimed, but a tape recording played three times a day.

In the 1960s, St. Mary's remained one of the largest parishes in the archdiocese. A new convent was needed for the nuns who worked at the school. A total of $300,000 was pledged for a larger convent, and it was paid off within three years. The construction began in the spring 1963, was finished the summer of the following year, and had stained glass windows in the chapel depicting Jesus and Mary. When it opened on Avery Street, 15 nuns moved in and there was space for 22. The old convent was torn down, and a parking lot was put in its place. At the confirmation mass in 1965, Bishop Thomas Joseph Riley blessed the new building.

The church was still too small, and was too much work for one pastor and three assistant priests, however. A second parish was established for the Riverdale neighborhood, St. Susana's, in 1962. In 1968, Fr. Frank Daly came to St. Mary's. He later was married and left the priesthood. In 2016, two years after the death of his wife, he returned to his priestly faculties.

Monsignor Charles F. Dewey became pastor in 1969. It was Dewey who hired the Andover Organ Company to renovate the Hook & Hastings organ in the choir loft, which was said to be one of the finest in the Archdiocese. In the 1970s the lower church was renovated, and a reconciliation room was added.

=== Late 20th century ===
In 1975, Father Edward Banks, S.J. arrived at St. Mary's. He had previously taught in Baghdad, Iraq, but "our friend" Saddam Hussein expelled him as an American spy. He had grown up in St. Catherine's in Norwood and also spent time in other Middle Eastern cities. With one brief intermission, he would remain at St. Mary's until his death in 2001. It was a sign of the mutual affection between Banks and the parish that his funeral was held at St. Mary's, and not at the Jesuits' Campion Center, as would be typical for a member of his religious order.

In 1980, in preparation for the 100th anniversary of the church, small changes were made to the pews to improve traffic flow during Communion. A coronation tapestry also hung behind the statue of Mary in the lower church.

The number of people attending mass each week began to drop off rather dramatically in the early 1990s. In 1989, the average weekly attendance was 2,843 people. By 1995, however, it dropped to just 1,030. The following year, 1996, Father (later bishop) John Anthony Dooher and Father Chris Hickey arrived at St. Mary's within weeks of each other. Mass attendance increased by 50% that year alone, and in 1997 it was over 2,500. In September 1997, Hickey and youth minister Seán Flynn began a Life Teen program to minister to high school students.

== 21st century ==
In 2000, attendance at Sunday mass was 2,614, making it the 11th most active parish of the 357 parishes then in the archdiocese. It performed the 8th most sacraments in 2001–2002. As of 2016, the parish had 2,700 families as parishioners. The nature of the parish switched during this time from being a place simply where sacraments were offered to offering more social services as well. The parish grounds are currently used for community groups such as three Alcoholics Anonymous groups, senior citizens, and a Moms and Tots group. There are between 600 and 700 people who come to the church each week.

The parish itself has 40 active groups. These include outreach to the poor and senior citizens, a crocheting, knitting, and quilting group, a women's bowling league, book clubs, and youth groups. In addition, the St. Joseph's Chapel in the parish center is open from 6 a.m. to 9 p.m. each day.

=== 2015 painting ===
After consulting with the Parish and Finance Councils and holding a parish-wide Town Hall Meeting in the spring of 2014, Pastor William Kelly proposed repainting the interior of the Upper Church for the first time in over 25 years. It was originally painted with vibrant colors and patterns, but in the 1970s was completely painted in white with gold trim. As reasons for undertaking the project Kelly cited the need to maintain the physical structure of the church, the upcoming 150th anniversary of the parish, long-term planning and the collaborative process by which St. Mary's and nearby St. Susana's would come under a single pastor, and beauty in itself being "a fundamental element for our human, spiritual and intellectual happiness."

The cost was projected to be $300,000 and pledges were requested. The donations and pledges made were insufficient, however, so the plans were scaled back, a loan was taken out to cover the remainder, and a second collection was instituted once a month. As conducted, the project included the four walls of the church and the sanctuary, the two side altars, Stations of the Cross, the ceilings in the side aisles, and the center columns as high as the capitals. The center arches, main ceiling and choir loft were not included. The painting included many colors, and white stars painted on a blue background above the altar. Children of the parish were invited to sponsor a star. The project began on January 5, 2015 by the Graham Company and finished by the end of March.

=== Lower church ===
In 2010, the parish sold the parking lot across High Street to the Town of Dedham and a housing developer. The proceeds were used to demolish the old school building, and to re-purpose the lower church. Half of the lower portion of the church is a clubhouse for the LifeTeen program, and the other half is a multipurpose gathering space known as Mary Hall.

The pews from the lower church were salvaged and reused. Some became wall paneling and table stock for fast food restaurants, and others were transformed into serving boards for high-end restaurants. The pew ends were sold as is.

== Pastors ==
Pastor	Years
Patrick O'Beirne	1846–1866
John P. Brennan	1866–1877
Dennis J. O'Donovan	1877–1878 (Note: January 1877 to August 1888)
Robert J. Johnson	1878–1890
John H. Fleming	1890–1923
Henry A. Walsh	1923–1929
George P. O'Connor	1929–1943
Monsignor Mark C. Driscoll	1943-1960
Monsignor Edward C. Bailey	1960-1969
Monsignor Charles F. Dewey	1969-1987
George Connolly	1987-1989
Thomas Fleming	1989
Paul L. Toland	1989-1996
John Anthony Dooher	1996–2006
William Williams	2007–2010
William T. Kelly	2010–2016
Wayne L. Belschner	2016–present

=== Patrick O'Beirne ===
O'Beirne was born in Mohill, County Leitrim, on December 31, 1808 and arrived in America in 1833.

By 1846, the Catholic community in Dedham was well established enough that the town became part of the mission of St. Joseph's Church. The flood of Irish immigrants escaping the Great Famine necessitated holding Mass in the Temperance Hall, often O’Beirne often presiding. Mass was also occasionally celebrated in the Crystal Palace on Washington Street. Worshipers came from Dedham, South Dedham, West Dedham, and West Roxbury.

While at St. Joseph's, he had charge of the mission in Dedham, Massachusetts and he established what is today St. Mary's Church there. In 1856 the cornerstone was laid and, in 1857, the first St. Mary's Church was completed on Washington Street between Spruce and Marion Streets. On Easter Sunday, April 12, 1857, Father O’Beirne said Mass for the first time in the new 600 person church. (Note: One source says it was Christmas Day.) Reading from the 20th chapter of John's Gospel, O'Beirne proclaimed the news of Jesus' empty tomb. Though it was still part of the Roxbury Parish, O'Beirne or one of his assistants would travel to Dedham each Sunday to say mass.

O'Beirne remained pastor of St. Mary's until 1866, when Fr. John P. Brennan took over.

=== John P. Brennan ===
Brennan was born in Indiana but spent most of his childhood in Taunton, Massachusetts. His first assignment was in Roxbury before becoming the resident pastor of St. Mary's Church. Brennan took over for his uncle, the founding pastor, Fr. Patrick O'Beirne. He served at St. Mary's from 1866 to 1877.

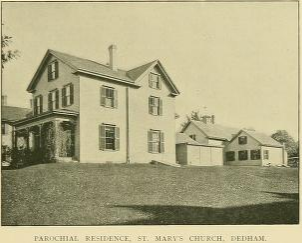
The rectory Brennan purchased in 1867

In June 1867, a house was purchased on High Street by Brennan and was converted into a rectory. Plans were then made for a new church to be constructed at this location. The current church was constructed next door to the rectory Father Brennan established on High Street. During his pastorate in Dedham, the Sisters of Charity founded the St. Mary's School and Asylum at what was formerly the Norfolk House.

The school held a number of fundraisers, but with the heavy debt of the parish the school closed on June 27, 1879. The closure was intended to be temporary, but it never reopened. The building was sold in 1905.

It was a "somewhat pleasant surprise" when it was announced on January 14, 1877, that Brennan would be leaving St. Mary's and that the parish would be turned over to his curate, Dennis J. O'Donovan. Many in the congregation had been unhappy with Brennan and the week before he became the first priest to ever file for bankruptcy. The parish was also bankrupt at the time.

=== Dennis J. O'Donovan ===
Fr Dennis J. O'Donovan announced on January 14, 1877 that Fr. John Brennan would be leaving St. Mary's Church in Dedham, Massachusetts and St. Catherine's in Norwood, which was part of the same parish. Many in the congregation had been unhappy with Brennan and the week before he became the first priest to ever file for bankruptcy. The parish was also bankrupt at the time. Donovan took over for Brennan as pastor, and served until August 1888. Donovan expanded and improved St. Catherine's during his time as pastor. When he resigned in 1878 due to failing health his parishioners presented him with a resolution expressing their thanks and $550.

=== Robert J. Johnson ===
Johnson was born in Ireland. Johnson served as past of St. Mary's Church from August 1878 to 1890.

During this decade, Johnson was publicly raising the issue of discrimination against Catholics in the public schools. He served two terms on the Dedham School Committee, from 1884 to 1890. As a member of the School Committee in 1885, he claimed the principal of the Avery School ridiculed Catholic students, and several years later had a lengthy debate with a Protestant minister via letters in the Dedham Standard about the "rank misrepresentation of the Catholic Church" in a history book adopted by the School Committee.

During Johnson's pastorate, the cornerstone of the present St. Mary's Church was dedicated on October 17, 1880 by Archbishop John Williams. A crowd of between 4,000 and 5,000 people attended, and special trains were run from Boston and Norwood to accommodate all those who wished to attend. It was one of the largest gatherings in Dedham's history.

To serve the Catholics of East Dedham, he built St. Raphael's Church, but it was destroyed by fire a few years later. When he left St. Mary's, the Catholics and Protestants of the town were both sorry to see him go. He had become friends with all, including many of the leading men in town.

=== John H. Fleming ===
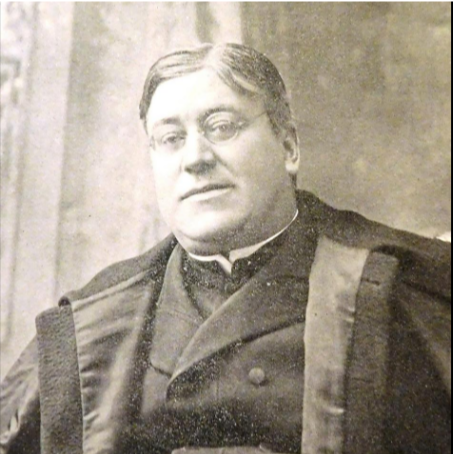
Father John Fleming

==== Personal life ====
John H. Fleming was born in Boston in 1849 and attended Boston Latin School before the College of the Holy Cross. Fleming studied for two years at the Grand Séminaire de Montréal and then two years at Saint-Sulpice Seminary in Paris, where he was ordained in 1874. He then traveled through Europe for several months before returning to Boston. These experiences, it was said, gave him "graces and accomplishments" not held by others who had not traveled as widely.

Fleming was described as "a man of large experience, rare culture, and varied attainments." His other qualities included "scholarship, eloquence, faith, [and] piety." He was said to have "abilities of the highest order, and his zeal is correspondingly warm." He had a conservative disposition and was described as "a gentleman of the old school." He was renowned as a scholar and often used his "tongue, pen, [and] purse" to support good causes.

While in Dedham, he also played a role in the affairs of the town. Fleming was a supporter of the temperance movement and served as vice president of the Massachusetts Catholic Total Abstinence Union. He had two sisters, Louise Fleming and Hannah Carney.

==== Ministry ====
Fleming was an eloquent speaker. He had an "unusual gift" of being able to put speak in a manner where words became "gems of thought." On Sundays, the quality of his preaching was such that other priests would come to St. Mary's to listen.

As a pastor, he was known to be an "able and efficient" manager."

===== Early ministry =====
His first assignment was at the Cathedral of the Holy Cross before moving to St. James the Greater Church on Harrison Avenue in Boston. He served as curate in both churches. While at St. James, he was sued by the parents of Lizzie Gordon, a teenage girl who claimed to have visions of the Virgin Mary and her dead brother. The case, which garnered national news, was eventually decided in favor of the girl but the jury only awarded $0.01 in damages.

After Fr. Henry J. Madden left St. Mary's Church in Ayer, Massachusetts in 1884, Fleming took over for him as pastor. He remained there for five years until being transferred to St. Mary's in Dedham in June 1890.

===== Dedham =====
Fleming arrived at St. Mary's in Dedham on June 2, 1890 and began a 33-year tenure as pastor. He dedicated himself to finishing the church that his predecessor, Fr. Robert J. Johnson, had started, making it "his life work." He contributed financially to the church construction as well, "dollar for dollar," with his parishioners. He adopted a "pay as you go" policy to construction.

After 20 years of working, praying, and fundraising from the meager immigrant wages of many of the parishioners, the upper church was finished during his pastorate. It took so long that another architect had to take over but was, according to Fleming, "almost too beautiful for ordinary use." One critic said that though some parishes in the area have more people than did the entire town of Dedham, "few parishes in Boston can boast of a more impressive Church" than St. Mary's. Another said it was second to none in the archdiocese. A local newspaper called it "an ornament and a credit to the town."

The parish cemetery in West Roxbury was also purchased during his tenure and the old wooden rectory next to the church was torn down so a new rectory could be built of Dedham Granite in 1913. (Note: Parr has the date as 1915.)

==== Death and legacy ====
The stress of World War I weighed heavily upon Fleming, taking a toll on his physical and mental health. Likewise, the Spanish flu epidemic of 1918 took such a toll on him that he was unable to read all the names of all those from St. Mary's who had died, as was the custom.

He died suddenly on April 24, 1923, at the Ambassador Hotel in Atlantic City, New Jersey. He had been sick for a few months and traveled south to try to regain his strength. His body was transported to Boston, and then to Dedham, where he lay in state, first at the rectory and then in the church.

On April 28, 1923, the morning of his funeral, St. Mary's Church was packed with "throngs" of people, including scores of priests, and dignitaries from the church, state, county, and town, as well as representatives from fraternal societies. A low mass was said at 8 am for the children of the parish, and a solemn Requiem Mass was said at 10 am. He is buried with his mother in the Forest Hills Cemetery. It was said that "St. Mary's Church, one of the finest edifices in New England, stands as a lasting memorial to Father Fleming's work."

His estate totaled $85,000, of which he left $40,000 to the Carney Hospital to pay for four private rooms for St. Mary's parishioners who may become ill. His will stipulated that the parishioners using the rooms should be recommended by the pastor of the church and that preference should be given to people of humble but decent circumstances. His music machine, worth about $2,000, was left to St. John's Preparatory School.

He also left $1,000 for the sexton of the church and a large sum to both his sister and the parish. There were also bequests of $5,000 to Boston College and Emmanuel College. The educational funds were for scholarships for students from the parish who were recommended by the pastor. Any books not taken by his family were also left to Boston College. Fleming had previously donated books to the Boston College library.

Bequests were also made to a Little Sisters of the Poor Home for the Aged in Roxbury, Home for Destitute Catholic Children, St. Vincent's Orphan Asylum, St. Mary's Infant Asylum, and St. John's Industrial Home in Newton. He also left funds to supports the missions. The executors of his will were Fr. Charles A. Finn, Fr. Timothy C. Maney, and James. R. Flanagan.

=== Henry A. Walsh ===
Walsh was born in Newton, Massachusetts but moved as a child to East Boston. When Walsh was transferred from Needham to St. Mary's Church, a public reception was held for him at the town hall. He arrived in Dedham on July 16, 1923. As the construction on the church had recently been finished, Walsh was able to focus on the various groups and societies within the parish. His pastorate ended with his death in 1929.

== Parish school ==
While Johnson was pastor, the parish purchased a large lot of land across from the Storrs' home to one day be used as a school. Several decades later, a parochial school was started in 1932 by Father George P. O'Connor and run by the Sisters of St. Joseph.

For the first few years the school was limited by the lack of space, and classes were held in the convent. On June 16, 1935, the cornerstone for a new school was laid using the same golden trowel with ivory handle that was used in 1880 for the church. A crowd of 500 attended the ceremony.

In September 1936, the new building on High Street was open. The desks were bolted to the floor and had holes in them for inkwells.

On Sunday, January 24, 1954, it was announced that an increase in the school population required more space. The new school was constructed on the Greenhood Estate on High Street, which had been purchased several years before. The cost of the 16-room school was estimated to be $450,000.

A new addition was constructed in 1958, and the student population grew to 650. In 1966 it had over 800 students. It was in the 1960s that the 8th grade was added. The school had two classes per grade, with both nuns and laity as teachers. The school had a debt of $250,000, but it was paid off by 1966.

In December 1973, the pastor, Monsignor Charles Dewey, announced the school would close in 1975. At the time, 9 nuns taught 16 classes comprising 525 students. The graduating class had 85 students and two teachers.

The school was largely vacant for many years, being used only for CCD classes. In the 1990s it was used by the British School of Boston, and the Rashi School, a Boston area Reform Jewish K-8 independent school. The building was razed in 2010.

== Daughter congregations ==
There have been a total of four congregations that have had territory partially split off from St. Mary's: St. Raphael's in East Dedham (1878), St. Catherine's in South Dedham (Norwood), (1890), West Roxbury's St. John Chrysostom (1952), and St. Susanna's in the Riverdale section of Dedham (1960).

=== St. Raphael's ===
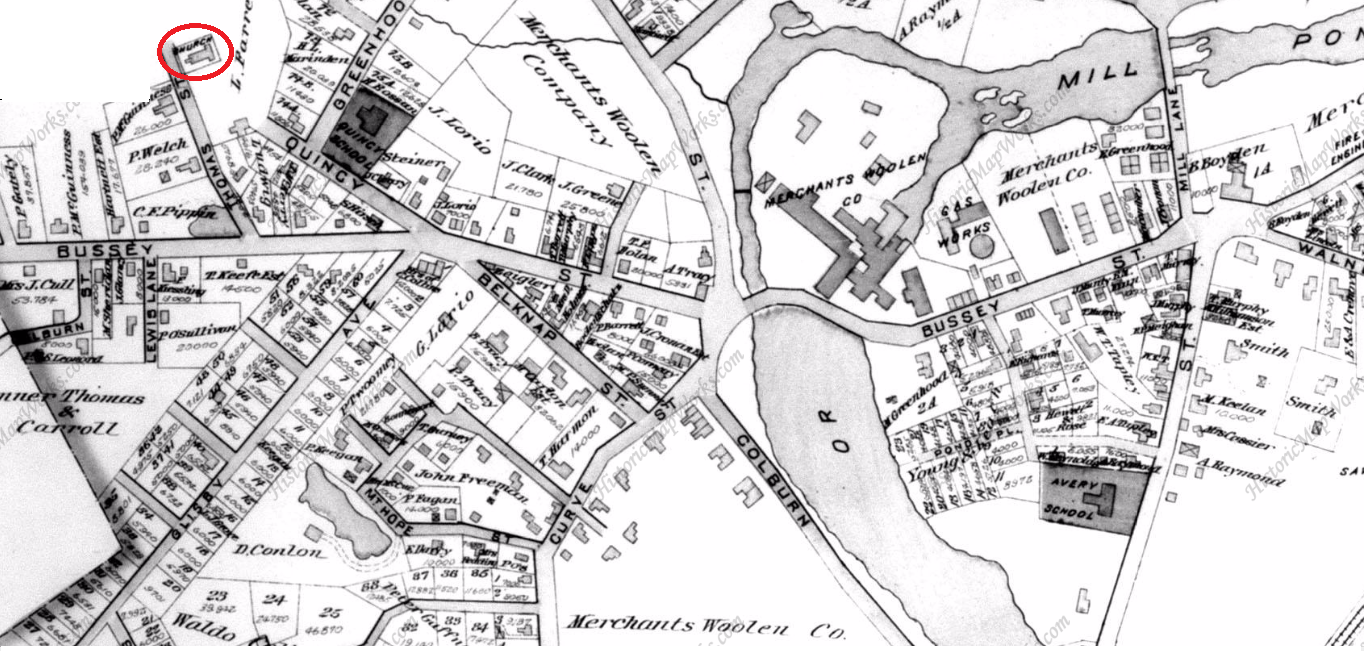
A map from 1888 showing St. Raphael's Church in a red circle at top left

Due to the growth of the Catholic population, about 200 parishioners in East Dedham were reassigned in January 1878 to Father Richard Barry's care in the Germantown Association's Chapel (St. Theresa's Church) in West Roxbury. This left St. Mary's parish small and with few resources.

On October 28, 1878, St. Raphael's Chapel was established on Thomas Street in East Dedham with the territory that had been broken off from St. Mary's. Dedicated by Archbishop Williams, St. Raphael's sat about 400 people, and in 1880 they added a hall for the amusement of young men at a cost of $8,000.

Many were not pleased with the change, and the first mass was attended by only six people. A petition was presented to Archbishop Williams asking him to reunite the parishes, and proposing to transform the chapel that had been erected into a school. After it burned to the ground on December 17, 1879, St. Raphael's was merged back into St. Mary's. The Catholics of Dedham were reunited in 1880.

The new parish sponsored Court 26 of the Catholic Orders of Foresters. The Court survived the Church, staying active at least into the 1920s.

=== St. Catherine's ===
Only six years after building the first church, another building was purchased from the Unitarians of South Dedham at the site of the present day St. Catherine's rectory. The purchase price was $3,000. Named for St. Catherine of Siena, it was dedicated on August 3, 1863. The Town of Norwood broke away from Dedham in 1872, and St. Catherine's was established as a separate parish in 1890 with 1,500 parishioners.

=== St. Susanna's ===
By the 1930s, St. Mary's was one of the largest parishes in the Archdiocese with over 6,000 parishioners and 1,300 students in Sunday School. During the middle of that decade there were four priests and six nuns ministering to the congregation. In the 1950s, it became clear that a second parish was needed in Dedham, (Note: The population of the town as a whole more than doubled between 1930 and 1970.) and so St. Susanna's was established in 1960 to serve the needs of the Riverdale neighborhood. When St. Susanna's opened it had 300 families, while 2,500 stayed at St. Mary's. The first pastor of St. Susana's, Father Michael Durant, lived at St. Mary's while his church was being constructed.

== Works cited ==
- Austin, Walter (1912). Tale of a Dedham tavern: history of the Norfolk hotel, Dedham, Massachusetts. Riverside Press.
- Byrne, William; Leahy, W. A.; Dowling, Austin; Young, E. J. A.; Finen, J. E. (1899). Introductory. The Hurd & Everts co. pp. 323–324.
- Clarke, Wm. Horatio (1903). Mid-Century Memories of Dedham. Dedham Historical Society.
- Dedham Historical Society (2001). Images of America:Dedham. Arcadia Publishing. ISBN 978-0-7385-0944-0.
- Hurd, Duane Hamilton (1884). History of Norfolk County, Massachusetts: With Biographical Sketches of Many of Its Pioneers and Prominent Men. J. W. Lewis & Company.
- Johnson, Robert J.; Cooke, George Willis (1889). Sectarian School-books: A Series of Letters. A. Mudge & Son, Printers.
- Neiswander, Judith (2024). Mother Brook and the Mills of East Dedham. Damianos Publishing. ISBN 978-1-941573-66-2.
- Lord, Robert Howard; Sexton, John E.; Harrington, Edward T. (1944). History of the Archdiocese of Boston, 1886-1943. Sheed & Ward.
- Smith, Frank (1936). A History of Dedham, Massachusetts. Transcript Press. "st mary dedham."
- Parr, James L. (2009). Dedham: Historic and Heroic Tales From Shiretown. The History Press. ISBN 978-1-59629-750-0.
