= Robert J. Johnson (priest) =

Irish-born priest

Robert J. Johnson (died January 1, 1916) was an Irish-born priest who ministered in the Archdiocese of Boston.

== Personal life ==
Johnson was born in Ireland and fluent in Irish. He was friends with Henry Cabot Lodge. Following the Spanish–American War, Johnson spoke out against the atrocities the United States government was committing against the Filipinos.

He died on January 1, 1916, and was buried on January 4 in Lowell, Massachusetts, after a funeral at Gate of Heaven Church in South Boston. There was a large crowd of priests in attendance and the church was not big enough to hold all of the people who wished to attend.

== Ministry ==
Johnson built St. Mary's Church in Dedham, St. Eulalia's at City Point, and Gate of Heaven Church in South Boston. He also served as a curate at S.S. Peter and Paul in South Boston. On July 1, 1898, he was appointed chaplain of the Suffolk County House of Correction. It was said that he "was a perfect treasure-house of theological lore."

=== St. Mary's Church ===
Johnson served as past of St. Mary's Church in Dedham, Massachusetts from August 1878 to 1890.

During this decade, Johnson was publicly raising the issue of discrimination against Catholics in the public schools. He served two terms on the Dedham School Committee, from 1884 to 1890. As a member of the School Committee in 1885, he claimed the principal of the Avery School ridiculed Catholic students, and several years later had a lengthy debate with a Protestant minister via letters in the Dedham Standard about the "rank misrepresentation of the Catholic Church" in a history book adopted by the School Committee.

During Johnson's pastorate, the cornerstone of the present St. Mary's church was dedicated on October 17, 1880, by Archbishop John Williams. A crowd of between 4,000 and 5,000 people attended, and special trains were run from Boston and Norwood to accommodate all those who wished to attend. It was one of the largest gatherings in Dedham's history.

The crowd included many of the leading citizens of Dedham as well as 30 priests. The clergy included Father Theodore Metcalf (Note: Theodore Metcalf was a descendant of Michael Metcalf, a signer of the Dedham Covenant. Michael was also a teacher in Dedham, at the first public school in America.) of the Cathedral of the Holy Cross who served as Master of Ceremonies. (Note: Metcalf would go on to Gate of Heaven Church, where Johnson would succeed him.) The footprint of the Gothic church, which Father Johnson said was to be a "cathedral in the wilderness," measures 150' long by 65' wide, and the bell tower is 164' tall.

To serve the Catholics of East Dedham, he built St. Raphael's Church, but it was destroyed by fire a few years later. When he left St. Mary's, the Catholics and Protestants of the town were both sorry to see him go. He had become friends with all, including many of the leading men in town.

=== Gate of Heaven Church ===
After leaving St. Mary's, Johnson was pastor of Gate of Heaven Church from 1890 to his death in 1916.

Johnson became pastor on June 1, 1890. He was known as the "second founder" of Gate of Heaven. During his first years at Gate of Heaven, the parish had 10,000 parishioners and 600 girls enrolled in the school. With many societies and programs running, the church was too small to accommodate them. On March 4, 1895, the church caught on fire and the interior was destroyed. On April 10, 1895, services began inside the old church again, but it continued to be too small. Johnson began raising funds for a new church, partly though his personal magnetism. In 1896, the cornerstone was laid for a new church by Archbishop Williams. While construction was ongoing, he opened St. Eulalia's Chapel in City Point on May 6, 1900.

During construction, the stained glass windows were originally to be shipped from London duty-free. After two had been installed, however, the Treasury Department overruled the decision of the local collector and demanded a duty payment for the windows already installed and those yet to be delivered. Eventually Congress passed special legislation exempting the windows from the duty and, as a result of this precedent, all stained glass windows for houses of worship were exempt from duty in the Tariff Act of 1913.
