= Robert J. Johnson =

Robert J. Johnson may refer to:

- Robert J. Johnson (priest), an American Roman Catholic priest
- A number of men named Robert Johnson mistakenly placed on the No Fly List
