= Michael Metcalf (puritan) =

New England settler (1586-1664)

Coat of Arms of Michael Metcalf

Michael Metcalf (1586 – 27 December 1664) was an early English colonist in Massachusetts, who had been persecuted for his Puritan beliefs in his native England.

Metcalf was from Norwich, England and worked as a master weaver. His father was a Puritan minister. He was persecuted by Bishop Wren and the Church of England for his Puritan beliefs and, upon fleeing to Massachusetts, wrote a long letter addressed to "all true professors of Christ's gospel" in Norwich. He spoke of the "great trouble" he had with the "Arch-Deacon's and Bishop's court at the hands of my enemies concerning the matter of bowing as well as for other matters of like consequence."

Before the ecclesiastical court, Metcalf defended himself by quoting not only the Bible but also the church's own theologians. He related in his letter that their responses included "Blockhead, old heretic, the devil made you, I will send you to the devil." When his life was put in danger, his wife sometimes hid him in the thatched roof of their house. He left London on September 17, 1636, and arrived in New England on Christmas. He left his wife and children behind in England.

Metcalf was one of the first residents of Dedham, Massachusetts and a signer of the Covenant. In 1641, he served as Selectman. At the age of 70 he began teaching reading in the Dedham Public Schools, the first system of its kind in the country. In 1652, Metcalf purchased a joined armchair that is today the oldest dated piece of American furniture.

His descendant, Father Theodore Metcalf of the Cathedral of the Holy Cross in Boston, served as Master of Ceremonies at the laying of the cornerstone ceremony at St. Mary's Church in Dedham in 1880, 244 years after Metcalf arrived in Dedham.

== Works cited ==
- Lockridge, Kenneth (1985). A New England Town. New York: W.W. Norton & Company. ISBN 978-0-393-95459-3.
- Worthington, Erastus (1827). The history of Dedham: from the beginning of its settlement, in September 1635, to May 1827. Dutton and Wentworth.
- Hanson, Robert Brand (1976). Dedham, Massachusetts, 1635-1890. Dedham Historical Society. p. 35.
