= Charles Logue (builder) =

Founder of Charles Logue Building Company

Charles Logue (1858–1919) was an Irish immigrant to the United States who founded the Charles Logue Building Company. It constructed dozens of buildings in and around Boston, including South Boston's St. Brigid Church, as well as Fenway Park.

According to Boston historian Dennis Ryan, Logue became major contractor in the Irish community, building Boston College's campus as well as churches for the Boston Archdiocese. Mayor Patrick Collins appointed Logue to the Schoolhouse Committee in 1904, citing the need for a practical builder, and Mayor John "Honey Fitz" Fitzgerald, President John F. Kennedy's grandfather, relied on Logue to build a "busier, better Boston."He also worked on tenement commission and served as Schoolhouse Commissioner for the City of Boston. It was "one of the top building firms in Boston and [Logue] was the man behind some of the city’s premier construction projects."

Logue was born in Limavady, Ireland, and died while inspecting the roof of St. Mary's Church in Dedham, Massachusetts.
