= John P. Brennan (priest) =

First American Catholic priest to declare bankruptcy

Personal details
- Born: c. 1836 Indiana, United States
- Died: August 18, 1889 Taunton, Massachusetts, United States
- Education: College of the Holy Cross (graduated 1859)

John P. Brennan (c. 1836 – August 18, 1889) was the first American Catholic priest to declare bankruptcy.

== Personal life ==
Brennan was born in Indiana but spent most of his childhood in Taunton, Massachusetts. He was ordained a priest at Grand Séminaire de Montréal in 1856 and graduated from the College of the Holy Cross on July 6, 1859.

While in Foxborough, his health declined to the point where he had to give up his priestly duties. He spent the last four years of his life at his mother's house on Washington Street in Taunton, bedridden with chronic rheumatism, where he died on August 18, 1889.

== Ministry ==
His first assignment was in Roxbury before becoming the resident pastor of St. Mary's Church in Dedham, Massachusetts. Brennan took over for his uncle, the founding pastor, Patrick O'Beirne. He served at St. Mary's from 1866 to 1877.

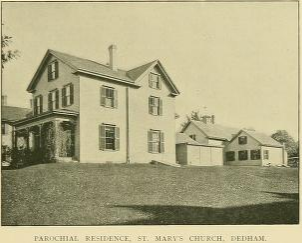
The rectory Brennan purchased in 1867

In June 1867, Brennan purchased a house on High Street and converted it into a rectory. Plans were then made for a new church at this location, and thus the current church was constructed next to the rectory. While in Dedham, he also took care of what is today the St. Catherine's Church in Norwood, Massachusetts, which he improved during his pastorate.

During his pastorate in Dedham, the Sisters of Charity founded St. Mary's School and Asylum at what was formerly the Norfolk House. At the news of the sale, the Dedham Gazette wrote in an editorial:

Whatever prejudices may naturally exist against the establishment of a Roman Catholic School in so central a location, the community cannot but feel that the transformation of a building recently used only for the indiscriminate sale of liquors into an institution founded for 'promoting virtue, learning and piety in the town of Dedham' is an object worthy only of the most exalted motives, and in this view should be accepted as a public blessing.

The school held a number of fundraisers, but with the heavy debt of the parish the school closed on June 27, 1879. The closure was intended to be temporary, but it never reopened. The building was sold in 1905.

It was a "somewhat pleasant surprise" when it was announced on January 14, 1877, that Brennan would be leaving St. Mary's and St. Catherine's and that the parish would be turned over to his curate, Dennis J. O'Donovan. Many in the congregation had been unhappy with Brennan. The week before, he became the first priest to ever file for bankruptcy. The parish was also bankrupt at the time.

In the early 1880s, he served at St. Mary's Church in Foxborough, Massachusetts. In 1883, he served in the Diocese of Springfield in Massachusetts.
