= Lizzie Gannon =

American hoaxer (born 1865)

Mary Elizabeth "Lizzie" Gannon (May 16, 1865 – after 1930) was an American hoaxer who as a teenager claimed to be a mystic and stigmatic haunted by visions of the Blessed Virgin Mary, saints, and her dead brother. (Note: Gannon lived at 141 Hudson Street in Boston.) Gannon gained notoriety in the early 1880s for suing a priest and bishop, claiming they had induced massive physical and emotional trauma since taking paper angels away from her, for which she was awarded one penny in damages by a court.

== Biography ==
Gannon was born in 1865 in Boston, Massachusetts to Irish-American parents William H. Gannon and Ann M. Gannon (née Ryan). She had an older brother, James F. Gannon, and older sister, Margaret Ann "Annie" Gannon. Her brother, who was listed as "insane" in the 1870 census, died of tuberculosis in 1874, aged 16. In the 1880 census, Lizzie was listed as being disabled by "hysteria."

== 'Angels' lawsuit ==
In 1881, Gannon's parents sued Fr. John H. Fleming and Archbishop John Joseph Williams for $5,000 (equivalent to $163,000 in 2024) in Suffolk Superior Court. (Note: Both clerics were represented by William Gaston, the former governor of the Commonwealth of Massachusetts.) Three years prior, they claimed Gannon began going into trances, during which she could not speak unless Fleming or a few others placed their hands on her. When she came out of them, she claimed to have received revelations from the Virgin Mary and to have seen saints and the faces of those who died.

Her family sent for Fleming, their parish priest, in the fall of 1878. Fleming would often attend to the girl, often in the company of another priest, and the visits seemed to help her. In one of her revelations, Gannon said that the Virgin Mary had a message for Fleming, that he was to write a book that told Gannon's story and of all of her visions. Fleming declined to write the book.

In the fall of 1879, Fleming visited the girl, who was entranced and holding in her hands two or three images of dolls or angels. They were about .75 inches long and appeared to be cut from heavy paper. Gannon said the images had been given to her by her dead brother, to whom she had been quite attached. (Note: Early reporting on the matter said the girl claimed the Virgin Mary gave her the images.) She also claimed to have received several other items from angels or spirits, including a letter written by the Virgin Mary. (Note: Gannon was also said to have given away the letter.) Fleming persuaded the girl to give the images to him.

During his visits, Fleming called in doctors and others to see if they could help the girl and she was diagnosed with hysteria by Dr. Hodges. A Dr. Porter suggested Gannon be sent to a hospital. Over time Fleming came to believe the girl was faking, and so stopped visiting around Christmas in 1880. Gannon's father tried to persuade Fleming to continuing visiting the girl. When he was unsuccessful in that, almost a year after she had given up the dolls, he asked for their return. Fleming told her father that he lost them. Gannon's father then appealed to Archbishop John Joseph Williams but the bishop sided with the priest.

When the suit was brought in the summer of 1881, the girl reportedly had hardly spoken for a year. She was bedridden and could not see or speak, according to her lawyers. Others testified that they had seen her doing work around the home, out shopping with her mother in the neighborhood, and even speaking. Her parents contended that her condition was brought about by the loss of the images. Others contended that the suit was brought when Fleming refused to help the girl and her family seek publicity. Before the case went to trial, Gannon's father published a book about his daughter.

The jury found for Gannon and awarded damages of $0.01.

Neither Lizzie or Annie ever married, and were living together in 1930.
