= Dennis J. O'Donovan =

American catholic priest

Dennis J. O'Donovan (Note: His last name was sometimes spelled "Donovan.") (died September 26, 1892) was an American Catholic priest in Massachusetts.

== Ministry ==
Early in his priesthood, O'Donovan was a curate at St. Augustine's in South Boston. O'Donovan announced on January 14, 1877, that John Brennan would be leaving St. Mary's Church in Dedham, Massachusetts and St. Catherine's in Norwood, which was part of the same parish. Many in the congregation had been unhappy with Brennan and the week before he became the first priest to ever file for bankruptcy. The parish was also bankrupt at the time.

Donovan took over for Brennan as pastor, and served until August 1888. Donovan expanded and improved St. Catherine's during his time as pastor. When he resigned in 1878 due to failing health, his parishioners presented him with a resolution expressing their thanks and $550.

On July 29, 1873, Donovan was commissioned as chaplain of the Ninth Regiment of the Massachusetts Militia. He served until April 1876, resigned, and then resumed his post in September of the same year. He resigned again in September 1879.

In 1874, he was named chaplain for the prisoners at the Deer Island Prison. In 1875, he was a candidate for the Boston School Committee on the Democratic ticket. He was also a member of the Philo-Celtic Society.

In his final days he was an assistant at the Cathedral of the Holy Cross. He died at the Carney Hospital on September 26, 1892, and is buried in St. Augustine's in South Boston. His funeral was attended by more than 100 priests.

== Works cited ==
- Byrne, William; Leahy, W. A.; Dowling, Austin; Young, E. J. A.; Finen, J. E. (1899). Introductory. The Hurd & Everts co. pp. 323–324.
- Hurd, Duane Hamilton (1884). History of Norfolk County, Massachusetts: With Biographical Sketches of Many of Its Pioneers and Prominent Men. J. W. Lewis & Company.
- Sullivan, James S. (1895). One hundred years of progress: a graphic, historical, and pictorial account of the Catholic Church of New England, Archdiocese of Boston. Boston: Illistrated Publishing Company. OL 24364821M.
