= St. Mary's Church (Dedham, Massachusetts) =

- St. Mary of the Assumption Church
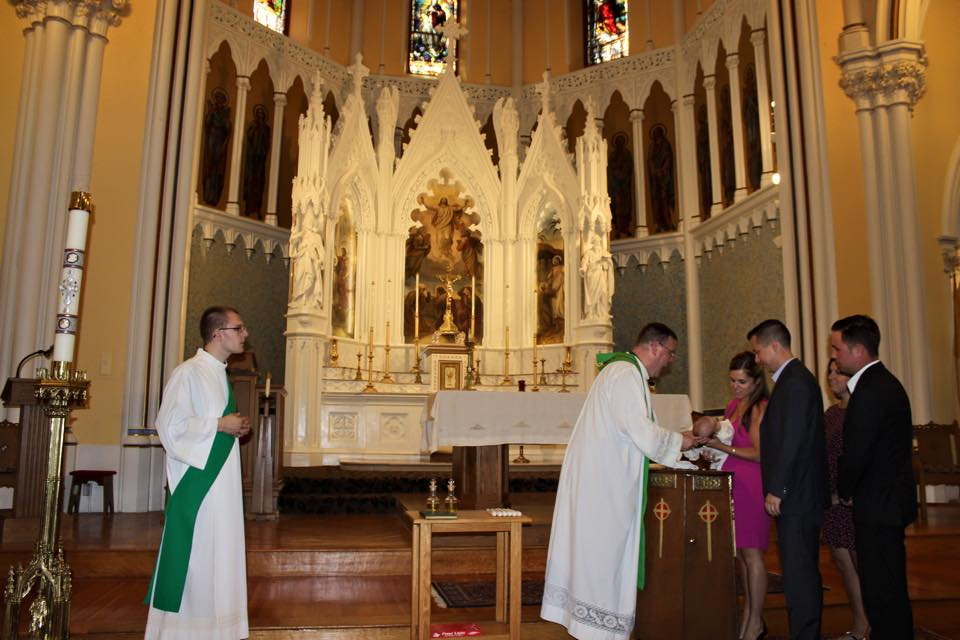
- St. Mary's Church
- 42°14′53″N 71°9′59″W
- Location: Dedham, Massachusetts
- Country: United States
- Denomination: Roman Catholic
- Website: www.StMaryDedham.com

History
- Founded: 1866
- Founder: Father Patrick O'Beirne
- Dedication: Assumption of Mary
- Dedicated: September 9, 1900

Architecture
- Architect: Patrick W. Ford

Administration
- Province: Boston
- Diocese: Archdiocese of Boston

Clergy
- Archbishop: Most Rev. Richard G. Henning
- Priest: Huan Dominic Ngo
- Pastor: Wayne L. Belschner

St. Mary of the Assumption Church (commonly referred to as St. Mary's) is a parish of the Roman Catholic Church in Dedham, Massachusetts, in the Archdiocese of Boston.

The first church was constructed in Dedham Centre in 1857 and it was formally established as a parish in 1866. In 1880 the parish built a larger church on High Street, towards East Dedham. The laying of the cornerstone for this "cathedral in the wilderness" attracted more than 4,000 people, and special trains were run from Boston and Norwood. The new church would not be completed until 1900, and was dedicated by Archbishop Sebastiano Martinelli, the papal delegate. Today the church hosts one of the largest Life Teen programs in the country.

== History ==
=== Early history ===
The history of Catholicism in Dedham begins in 1758, only 120 years after the settlement of the Contentment Plantation and fully two decades before the American Revolution. During the French and Indian War the British expelled over 11,000 Acadians from what is today Nova Scotia. Eleven of them resettled in Dedham, and though the town and the Massachusetts Bay colony were both officially Congregationalist, they were allowed to reside here as French neutrals until they returned to Canada in 1760.

After the Acadians returned to Canada in 1760, Dedham would not see another Catholic resident for decades. The first Catholic who spent any length of time in Dedham was Mr. Gill, who lived in what is today known as Riverdale, but was then called Dedham Island. The few Catholics who lived in Dedham would have to travel 16 miles to St. Joseph's in Roxbury, the Cathedral of the Holy Cross on Franklin Street in Boston, or to St. Mary's in Waltham to attend Mass.

By the early 1800s a few Catholics had settled in Dedham. The first Mass in Dedham was celebrated in Sunday, May 15, 1843, in the home of Daniel Slattery, with eight Catholics present. (Note: While the Slattery home is still standing, at the corner of Washington and Worthington Streets, at the time it was on the corner of Washington and High, where the Police Station sits in 2016. During the Revolution, the Worthington Street land was the site of an encampment for French troops under the command of Count Rochambeau.) An altar was set up by the window. For the next three years Slattery's 17-year-old brother-in-law would bring Father James Strain from Waltham and back each Sunday to minister to the needs of the small congregation. (Note: Father Strain was born in Ireland in 1815, and was received into the Diocese of Boston in 1840. He had a rather tumultuous career here, and bounced around not only from parish to parish, but even to several other dioceses, before eventually returning to Ireland in 1850.)

By 1846, the Catholic community in Dedham was well established enough that the town became part of the mission of St. Joseph's Church in Roxbury. The flood of Irish immigrants escaping the Great Famine necessitated holding Mass in the Temperance Hall, often by Father Patrick O'Beirne. Mass was also occasionally celebrated in the Crystal Palace on Washington Street. Worshipers came from Dedham, South Dedham, West Dedham, and West Roxbury.

=== First Church ===
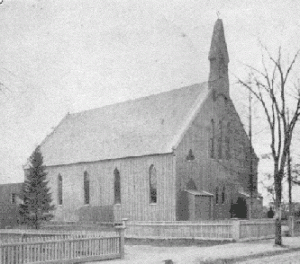
The first St. Mary's Church

The number and devotion of the first parishioners permitted a church to be constructed within 10 years. In 1856 the cornerstone was laid and, in 1857, the first St. Mary's Church was completed on Washington Street between Spruce and Marion Streets. On Easter Sunday, April 12, 1857, Father O'Beirne said Mass for the first time in a new church that could seat 600. (Note: One source says it was Christmas Day.)

During the 1880s, Father Johnson was publicly raising the issue of discrimination against Catholics in the public schools. In 1885, as a member of the School Committee, (Note: Johnson served two terms, from 1884 to 1890.) he claimed the principal of the Avery School ridiculed Catholic students, and several years later had a lengthy debate with a Protestant minister via letters in the Dedham Standard about the "rank misrepresentation of the Catholic Church" in a history book adopted by the School Committee.

In 1890 there were an estimated 2,000 parishioners, including 957 Irish, 250 English-speaking Canadians, 58 French, 19 Italians and 1 Portuguese. There were 400 students in the Sunday School classes in 1884.

=== Church construction ===
In February 1880, it was announced that, Albert W. Nickerson, a vestryman at St. Paul's Church, an Episcopal church in Dedham, had paid off the parish's $700 debt, allowing the congregation to commence work on a new building. The cornerstone of the present church was laid at 3:00 on October 17, 1880 by Archbishop John Williams. A crowd of between 4,000 and 5,000 people attended, and special trains were run from Boston and Norwood to accommodate all those who wished to attend. It was one of the largest gatherings in Dedham's history.

The footprint of the Gothic church, which Father Johnson said was to be a "cathedral in the wilderness," measures 150' long by 65' wide, and the bell tower is 164' tall. The apex of the ceiling is 80' and it has the longest aisle in the Archdiocese of Boston. It was at the time, and remains today, "the largest and most imposing church in the town" and "one of the most conspicuous edifices" in the town.

The interior walls were plastered by William B. Gould, an escaped slave who settled in Dedham. While the upper church was still under construction, the lower church was used for Mass and the upper portion for various fairs and other gatherings. The first mass was said in the lower church on October 24, 1886. The crowd was overflowing, and included 20 Protestants, many of local importance, and a choir from St. Peter's in South Boston.

The Upper Church was completed after twenty years of work. At the time of completion the church was, Father Fleming said, “almost too beautiful for ordinary use.”

The upper church was completed and dedicated by Archbishop Williams on September 9, 1900. In addition to Williams, Archbishop Sebastiano Martinelli, the papal delegate to the United States, attended, as did Bishop Denis Mary Bradley of New Hampshire. The crowd, numbered at 1,200, included the communion class and many prominent citizens of the Town, including Protestants. The dedication packed the church, requiring many to stand, and tickets were required to enter.

Albert Nickerson, a member of Dedham's St. Paul's Episcopal Church, donated $10,000 towards the effort. (Note: Nickerson was the wealthiest man in Dedham at the time of his death. He was a philanthropist, and donated to several causes in Dedham, including other churches.) The Dedham Granite for the outer walls was donated by another Protestant, John Bullard. The granite came from Bullard's own lot.

=== 20th century ===
In June 1890, Father John H. Fleming arrived at St. Mary's and began a 33-year tenure as pastor. During his pastorate the parish the upper church would be completed, the parish cemetery in West Roxbury would be purchased, and the old wooden rectory next to the church would be torn down so a new rectory could be built of Dedham Granite in 1913. (Note: Parr has the date as 1915.) On Sundays, however, the quality of his preaching was such that other priests would come to St. Mary's to listen.

In the 1920s, with the building work completed, new pastor Father Henry A. Walsh was able to focus on the various groups and societies within the parish. The Catholic population in the area grew, as did the amount of social activity within the parish. By 1936, the parish was one of the largest in the Archdiocese of Boston with 6,000 parishioners, four priests, and six nuns. The Sunday School alone had over 1,300 pupils. Within months of arriving as pastor in 1929, Father George P. O'Connor began a parish school with three Sisters of St. Joseph. He also began a Catholic Youth Organization, and was generally regarded as having a focus on youth.

=== Modern history ===
In the 1960s, St. Mary's remained one of the largest parishes in the archdiocese. As it was too much work for one pastor and three assistant priests, a second parish was established for the Riverdale neighborhood, St. Susanna's, in 1962. As the school was also growing, a new convent was constructed in 1964.

The number of people attending Mass each week began to drop off rather dramatically in the early 1990s. In 1989, the average weekly attendance was 2,843 people. By 1995, however, it dropped to just 1,030. The following year, 1996, Father (later bishop) John Anthony Dooher and Father Chris Hickey arrived at St. Mary's within weeks of each other. Mass attendance increased by 50% that year alone, and in 1997 it was over 2,500. In September 1997, Hickey and youth minister Seán Flynn began a Life Teen program to minister to high school students.

== Features ==
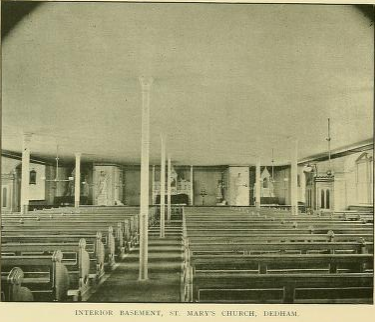
The basement of St. Mary's in 1895

The footprint of the Gothic church, which Father Johnson said was to be a "cathedral in the wilderness," measures 150' long by 65' wide, and the bell tower is 164' tall. The apex of the ceiling is 80' and it has the longest aisle in the Archdiocese of Boston. It was at the time, and remains today, "the largest and most imposing church in the town" and "one of the most conspicuous edifices" in the town.

There are four large doorways facing High Street, and granite buttresses give the church "an appearance of strength and solidarity." The doors, like the pews, were made of polished oak. The altar was carved from Caen stone, and the altar rail of green onyx. Today one of those doors is permanently shut as that portion of the vestibule has become a Reconciliation room, and the altar rail has been moved down to the space in front of the front pew. As built, it had a seating capacity of 1,200 in the vestry and 1,500 in the church proper. An organ sits high above the nave in a choir loft that can hold 50 singers.

The broad front stairs originally pointed out away from the Church with a brass railing in the middle, but due to a widening of High Street in the 1920s they were turned to run parallel with the street. When built, the church was said to be fireproof with "ventilation and heating system of the best, and the acoustic properties unexcelled." The windows are of "rolled cathedral stained glass" and were made by four German companies: Tyrolese Art Glass Company, (Note: Also known in German as the Tiroler Glasmalerei Anstalt.) (Note: The Tyrolese Art Glass Company was a leader in the use of style of composition and painting techniques which became known as the Munich Style, which was very popular at the time.) Franz Mayer of Munich, Franz Xaver Zettler, and Royal Bavarian Stained Glass. Despite being made by different companies, the windows all have similar scales, color ranges, and placement of figures, creating the appearance of a cohesive whole.

Lining the Church are fluted Grecian columns and seven arches. Crystal chandeliers hang along both sides of the nave, above the altar, and above the doors.

The semicircular apse had stained glass windows showing, from left to right, St. Patrick, St. Peter, the Assumption of Mary, St. Paul and St. Brigid. At either end of the altar are statues of Saints Peter and Paul. In between are three paintings framed by elaborate gothic ornamentation on the rerdos.

== Parish ==
Pastor	Years
Patrick O'Beirne	1846–1866
John P. Brennan	1866–1877
Dennis J. O'Donovan	1877–1878 (Note: January 1877 to August 1888)
Robert J. Johnson	1878–1890
John H. Fleming	1890–1923
Henry A. Walsh	1923–1929
George P. O'Connor	1929–1943
Monsignor Mark C. Driscoll	1943-1960
Monsignor Edward C. Bailey	1960-1969
Monsignor Charles F. Dewey	1969-1987
George Connolly	1987-1989
Thomas Fleming	1989
Paul L. Toland	1989-1996
John Anthony Dooher	1996–2006
William Williams	2007–2010
William T. Kelly	2010–2016
Wayne L. Belschner	2016-present

In 2006, the parish served 2,329 families, and in 2015 it sponsored 38 ministries in six categories: prayer, liturgical, social, outreach, health and wellness, and parishioner sponsored.

=== Life Teen ===
One of the largest ministries in St. Mary's today in its Life Teen program, which ministers to high school aged youth. It was founded in September 1997 by Fr. Chris Hickey, then-pastor John Dooher, and youth minister Seán Flynn.

The teens' "enthusiasm for church has brought a special vibrancy" to the parish. A Life Teen mass is offered on Sunday evenings and features a live band, and is then followed by social and catechitical sessions known as Life Nights. Participants have their own prayer night, perform community service, and gather to socialize in their clubhouse.

=== Convent and parish office ===
Behind the church on Avery Street is the Parish Office. It was previously a convent that housed the nuns who taught in the parish school. The stained glass windows in the building were done by Chartrand.

=== Cemetery ===
In 1880, the Town of Dedham set aside a portion of Brookdale Cemetery, just a block away from St. Mary's, for Catholics to be buried. Under the pastorate of Fr. John H. Fleming (1890–1923), the parish purchased its own cemetery just over the border in West Roxbury. It still operates the cemetery on Grove Street today.

=== 150th anniversary ===
In 2016 the parish celebrated its 150th anniversary with a year long celebration. Included in this was a mass on October 2 celebrated by Cardinal Seán Patrick O'Malley. Other events included a healing mass and an organ concert.

=== Vocations ===
Four LifeTeen alumni have been ordained priests. Will Sexton and Mike Zimmerman were both teens in the program, and were ordained alongside Stoughton, MA LifeTeen alumnus Kevin Leaver in 2017, who was a Dedham CORE member before ordination. Together the three made up 37.5% of those being ordained for the Archdiocese of Boston in 2017. In 2022, Nicholas Stano and Patrick O'Connor, who were also teens in the Dedham program, were also ordained for the Archdiocese of Boston. In 2023, Peter Schirripa, who served as a CORE Member before entering the seminary, was ordained for the Archdiocese of Boston. From 2005 to 2018, the parish sent 15 men to the seminary and currently has two women living as consecrated virgins.

== Notes and citations ==
=== Works cited ===
- Austin, Walter (1912). Tale of a Dedham tavern: history of the Norfolk hotel, Dedham, Massachusetts. Riverside Press.
- Byrne, William; Leahy, W. A.; Dowling, Austin; Young, E. J. A.; Finen, J. E. (1899). Introductory. The Hurd & Everts co. pp. 323–324.
- Hurd, Duane Hamilton (1884). History of Norfolk County, Massachusetts: With Biographical Sketches of Many of Its Pioneers and Prominent Men. J. W. Lewis & Company.
- Johnson, Robert J.; Cooke, George Willis (1889). Sectarian School-books: A Series of Letters. A. Mudge & Son, Printers.
- Lord, Robert Howard; Sexton, John E.; Harrington, Edward T. (1944). History of the Archdiocese of Boston, 1886-1943. Sheed & Ward.
- Parr, James L. (2009). Dedham: Historic and Heroic Tales From Shiretown. The History Press. ISBN 978-1-59629-750-0.
- Smith, Frank (1936). A History of Dedham, Massachusetts. Transcript Press. "st mary dedham."
