= Grand Séminaire de Montréal =

School in Montreal

Coordinates: 45.4938°N 73.5857°W

- Motto: In Dilectione et Scientia
- Type: Public
- Established: 1840; 1967 (under Université de Montréal)
- Location: Montreal, Quebec, Canada
- Website: Grand séminaire de Montréal

The Grand séminaire de Montréal (French pronunciation: [ɡʁɑ̃ seminɛʁ də mɔ̃ʁeal], "Major Seminary of Montreal") is the centre for priestly formation of the Roman Catholic Archdiocese of Montreal.

== History ==
The institution was founded by the Sulpicians in 1840 at the request of the then-Bishop of Montreal, Ignace Bourget. In 1878, a branch of Université Laval's Faculty of Theology was established in the Seminary. This academic partnership was transferred to the Université de Montréal in 1967. In 2020, the seminary moved from the historic building on Sherbrooke St. W. where it had operated since 1857, and its academic programs are now offered in partnership with the Faculty of Theology and Religious Sciences of Laval University.

== Organ ==
To celebrate the 150th anniversary of the Seminary, an organ in the French classical style, was built in the chapel, thanks to an anonymous donation: the instrument cost CA$450,000. The windchests can be actioned either manually or electrically. Built by Guilbault-Thérien, the organ's construction was strictly based on the writings and descriptions of Dom Bédos and François-Henri Clicquot. The organ has 39 stops spread over five divisions (four manuals and pedals), including mixtures which are essentially the same as those of the instrument by Clicquot in the Poitiers Cathedral, for a total of 63 ranks and just over 2800 pipes. The instrument is enclosed in a gold leaf-decorated solid oak case. The instrument's formal inauguration was held on November 7 1990 by Pierre Grandmaison.

The chapel previously had a tubular-pneumatic instrument, which had been installed in 1907, and later electrified and renovated in 1938 by Casavant Frères (opus 1596), before being subsequently expanded in 1958, and in 1964.

== Library ==
The library was founded at the moment of the creation of the Grand Séminaire de Montréal (Major Seminary of Montreal) in 1840. In the beginning, a small collection of 5000 volumes, originally from Saint Sulpice Seminary on Notre-Dame Street, was deserving teachers at the Grand Séminaire. The library opened its thresholds to seminarians only decades later in 1930. Between 1903 and 1907, Jean-Omer Marchand, a Montreal architect, designed the actual library. From the 1940s onwards, the library gradually opened to scholars, researchers, and theologians interested in sacerdotal subjects. The actual collection contains more than 155 000 works, among them a rich collection of rare books spanning from the Renaissance to the first half of the twentieth century.

In the beginning, the library was contained in the first three levels and the last three levels were occupied by the Collège de Montréal. Today, the upper levels are hosting the special collections owned by the Priests of Saint-Sulpice. All levels have in common a suspended structure allowed by steel floors, a real new technology at the time of the construction of the reserves in 1907.

From 2006 to 2020, Univers culturel de Saint-Sulpice was responsible in the administration, conservation and promotion of the rare books collection. In August 2021, the Quebec Minister of Culture and Communications, Nathalie Roy, authorized the listing of the collection in Quebec's cultural heritage registry (Répertoire du patrimoine culturel du Québec). The collection includes approximately 25 000 books and periodicals from different Sulpician libraries over the time. The collection comprises books published in Europe before 1801 or North America before 1851, works in Indigenous tongues, books that are remarkably illustrated, first editions of crucial works, titles that are remarkable for their erudition or for the quality of their notes and commentaries, books containing the owner’s signature (ex-libris) of Sulpicians or other personalities. Most of the titles are of religious matters but not only limited to works of theology such as book of arts, literature, medicine, botanic, philosophy and law. A vast majority of documents are written in French, but the collection also includes numerous works in Latin, as well as a few books in ancient Greek, in English and in indigenous languages.

== Notable alumni ==
- John P. Brennan

== Gallery ==
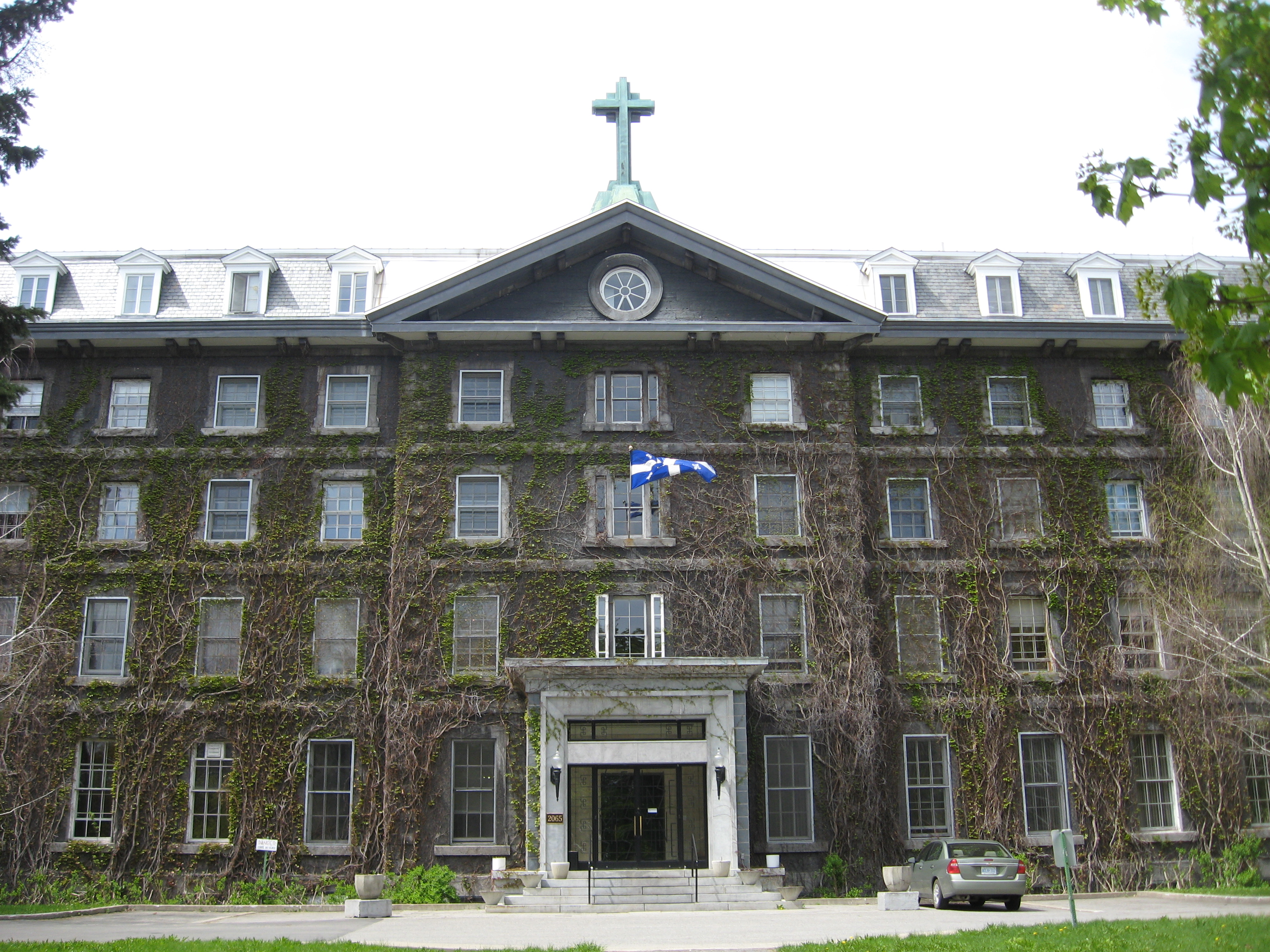
Front entrance

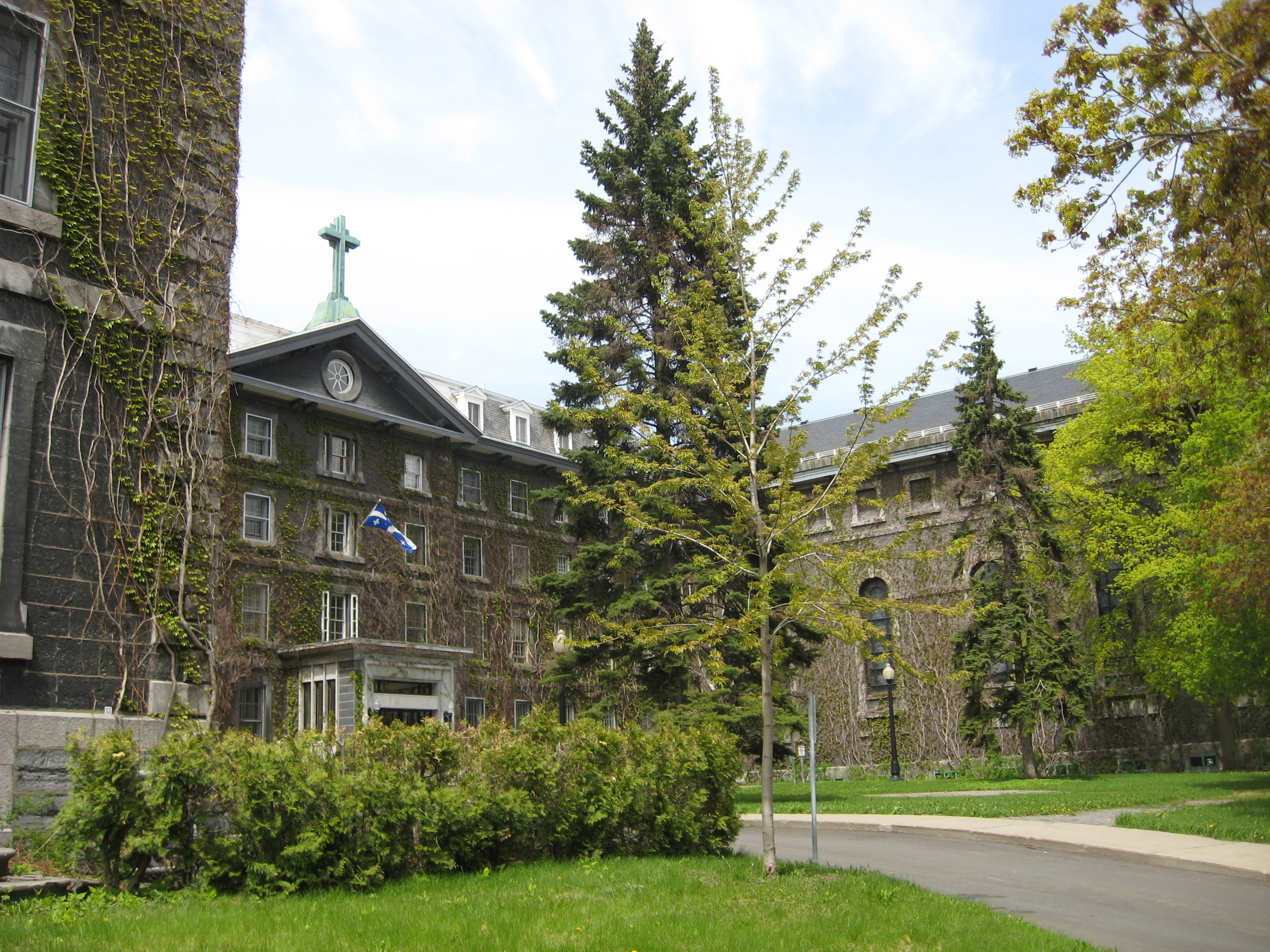
Front courtyard
