= Patrick O'Beirne =

Irish-born priest in Archdiocese of Boston

The Reverend Patrick O'Beirne

Orders
- Ordination: March 14, 1834

Personal details
- Born: December 31, 1808 Mohill, County Leitrim
- Died: March 20, 1883 (aged 74)
- Denomination: Roman Catholic, Latin Church
- Occupation: Priest, author

Patrick O'Beirne (December 31, 1808 – March 20, 1883) was an Irish-born priest who ministered in the Archdiocese of Boston.

== Personal life ==
He was born in Mohill, County Leitrim, on December 31, 1808, and arrived in America in 1833. His brother, John O'Beirne, was also a priest in Boston. Patrick died on March 20, 1883, and was buried next to his brother John on the grounds of St. Joseph's church in Roxbury.

== Ministry ==
O'Beirne was ordained a priest in 1835 (Note: Sulivan has the date as the year as 1834.) at the Cathedral of the Holy Cross in Boston by Bishop Benedict Fenwick. Over his career he served in Vermont, Rhode Island, and Maine, which were then parts of the Diocese of Boston.

Immediately after his ordination, he spent some time at the cathedral before being transferred to St. Mary's in the North End and then to Burlington, Vermont. From 1841 to 1843, he served at what would later become the Cathedral of the Immaculate Conception in Portland, Maine.

O'Beirne then was assigned to Roxbury's St. Patrick's parish, in Boston. As pastor of St. Patrick's, he established several new churches, including St. Joseph's, in Roxbury, and St. Thomas Aquinas in Jamaica Plain. He served as the first pastor of St. Joseph's and remained there until his death in 1883. At the suggestion of the religious sisters who ran the school, He also built a school house for the parish on the grounds of Notre Dame Academy in Roxbury. In 1858, he was the principal celebrant at the solemn high Mass dedicating Immaculate Conception Church in Salem, Massachusetts. Ordained for less than a decade, the 33-year-old O'Beirne had charge of the Catholics in Dedham, Norwood, Randolph, Holliston, Walpole, and Needham, as well as Roxbury.

Prior to his pastorate at St. Joseph's, O'Beirne had charge of the parish and mission in Quincy, Massachusetts, in West Quincy, St. Mary's 1843–45. While there, he purchased the land for what would become St. Mary's Church in Randolph. He also served in St. Mary's early days. Prior to the church being built, he would occasionally come out to say Mass for the Catholics of that community. He was also briefly pastor of St. Rose of Lima in Chelsea, Massachusetts and served at St. John the Evangelist in Hopkington, Massachusetts, and St. Mary's in Holliston, Massachusetts.

O'Beirne served on the Archbishop's Council and opened the Toll Gate Cemetery on Hyde Park Avenue.

=== Dispute at St. Mary's ===
O'Beirne served as co-pastor of St. Mary's Church in the North End with Fr. Thomas J. O’Flaherty beginning in 1840. The parish, made up largely of Irish immigrants, soon split into two camps with each supporting one of the two priests. The differences were partly political and partly about church governance. By January 1842 the congregation was so divided that Bishop Fenwick was worried that violence may erupt and so visited on January 9, 1842, to try to restore the peace. During Mass, he preached an hour long sermon on obedience and warned that those who attended mass meetings of protest could be excommunicated.

Just a few days later, on January 13, 1842, a large group of O'Flaherty supporters gathered. When a member of the O'Beirne camp disrupted the meeting's opening address, a "mob situation" arose. Police had to be called in to restore order. In response, Fenwick wrote to parishioners and invited them to attend another meeting on January 16, 1842. Parishioners from other parishes attended the meeting, disrupting it, and cutting it short to avoid another mob break out. Fenwick then ordered the two priests to publicly reconcile on January 23, 1842.

Not long after, O'Beirne requested a transfer to a different parish and was sent to Providence, Rhode Island, which was then part of the Boston Diocese. His supporters at St. Mary's were not happy, however, and 400 of them signed a petition calling for his return. When Fenwick refused, a riot broke out on February 20, 1842, during a vespers service O'Flaherty was presiding over.

Parishioners were arrested, and Fenwick placed the parish under an interdict that shuttered it for two weeks. In Providence, O'Beirnes new parishioners were not happy with him and told Fenwick so in insulting terms that the bishop would call "insolent" and "anti-Catholic". Still seeking a solution, Fenwick reassigned all the priests in the troubled parishes in March. O'Beirne moved again, this time to Taunton, Massachusetts.

=== Dedham ===
By 1846, the Catholic community in Dedham, Massachusetts, was well established enough that the town became part of the mission of St. Joseph's Church. The flood of Irish immigrants escaping the Great Famine necessitated holding Mass in the Temperance Hall, often O’Beirne. Mass was also occasionally celebrated in the Crystal Palace on Washington Street. Worshipers came from Dedham, South Dedham, West Dedham, and West Roxbury.

While at St. Joseph's, he had charge of the mission in Dedham, Massachusetts, and he established what is today St. Mary's Church there. In 1856 the cornerstone was laid and, in 1857, the first St. Mary's Church was completed on Washington Street between Spruce and Marion Streets. On Easter Sunday, April 12, 1857, Father O’Beirne said Mass for the first time in the new 600 person church. (Note: One source says it was Christmas Day.) Reading from the 20th chapter of John's Gospel, O'Beirne proclaimed the news of Jesus' empty tomb. Though it was still part of the Roxbury Parish, O'Beirne or one of his assistants would travel to Dedham each Sunday to say mass.

In April 1863 he purchased the Unitarian meetinghouse in South Dedham, today the parish of St. Catherine's in Norwood. Prior to this, he would say mass in the homes of South Dedham parishioners.

O'Beirne remained pastor of St. Mary's until 1866, when Fr. John P. Brennan took over.

== Works cited ==
- Winsor, Justin; Jewett, Clarence F. (1881). The Memorial History of Boston: Including Suffolk County, Massachusetts. 1630-1880. Ticknor. p. 525.
- Sullivan, James S. (1895). One hundred years of progress: a graphic, historical, and pictorial account of the Catholic Church of New England, Archdiocese of Boston. Boston: Illistrated Publishing Company. OL 24364821M.
- Hurd, Duane Hamilton (1884). History of Norfolk County, Massachusetts: With Biographical Sketches of Many of Its Pioneers and Prominent Men. J. W. Lewis & Company.
- Smith, Frank (1936). A History of Dedham, Massachusetts. Transcript Press. "st mary dedham."
- Byrne, William; Leahy, W. A.; Dowling, Austin; Young, E. J. A.; Finen, J. E. (1899). Introductory. The Hurd & Everts co. pp. 323–324.
- Patkus, Ronald D. (Winter 2001). "Conflict in the Church and the City: The Problem of Catholic Parish Government in Boston" (PDF). Historical Journal of Massachusetts. 29 (1). Institute for Massachusetts Studies and Westfield State University.
