= John Joseph Williams =

Catholic Archbishop of Boston (1822–1907)

The Most Reverend John Joseph Williams
- Archbishop of Boston
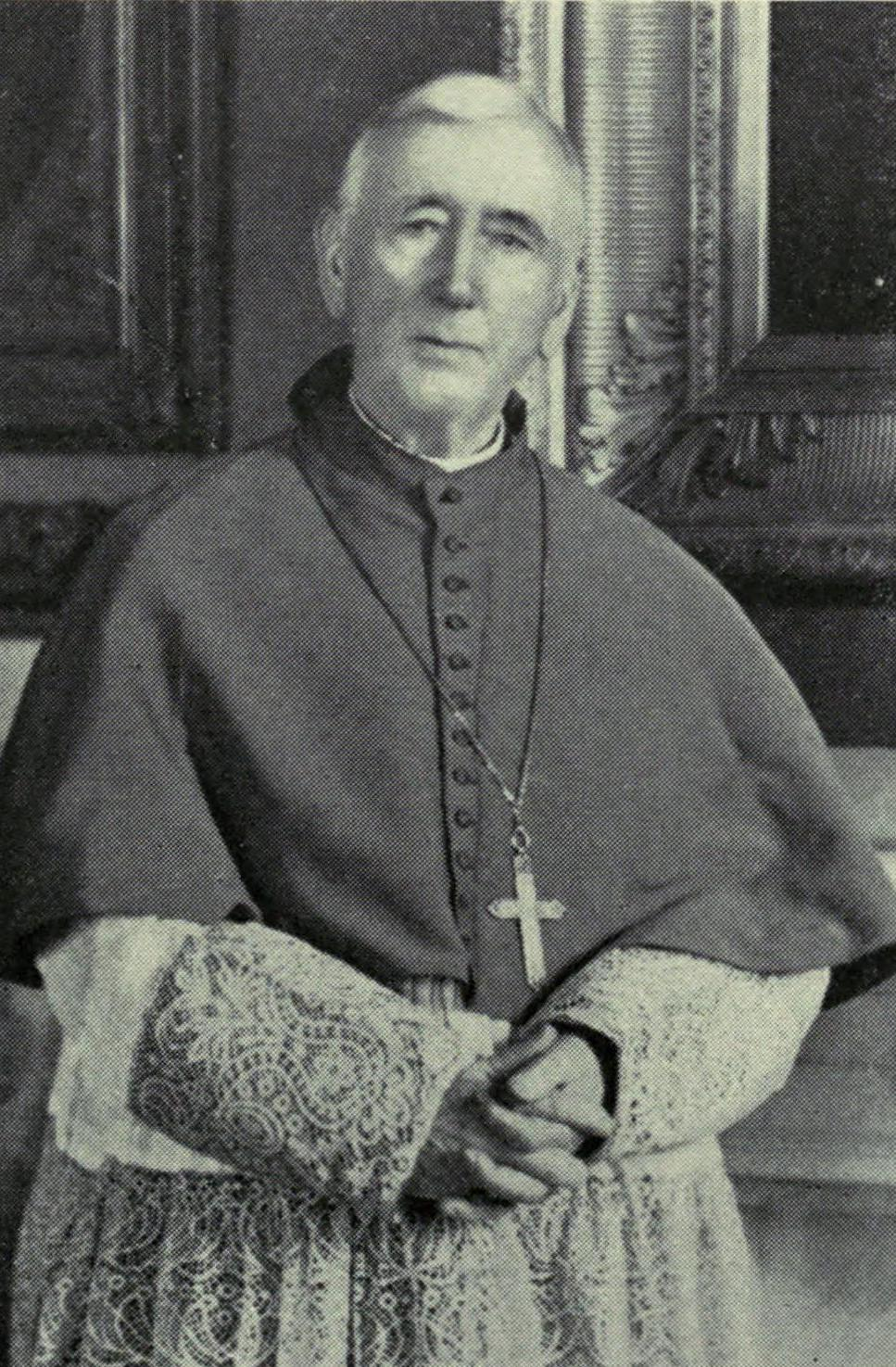
- Williams in 1902
- Church: Catholic Church
- Archdiocese: Boston
- Installed: March 11, 1866
- Term ended: August 30, 1907
- Predecessor: John Bernard Fitzpatrick
- Successor: William Henry O'Connell

Orders
- Ordination: May 17, 1845 by Denis Auguste Affre
- Consecration: March 11, 1866 by John McCloskey

Personal details
- Born: April 27, 1822 Boston, Massachusetts, U.S.
- Died: August 30, 1907 (aged 85) Boston, Massachusetts, U.S.
- Motto: In hoc vinces (Latin for 'In this sign you shall conquer')

John Joseph Williams (April 27, 1822 – August 30, 1907) was an American prelate of the Catholic Church. He led the Archdiocese of Boston for 41 years, serving as its fourth Bishop (1866–1875) and first Archbishop (1875–1907). During his tenure, he dedicated the Cathedral of the Holy Cross and opened St. John's Seminary.

== Early life and education ==
John Joseph Williams was born on April 27, 1822, in Boston, Massachusetts. His father, Michael Williams, was born in County Tipperary, Ireland, and immigrated to the United States in 1818. His mother, Ann Williams (née Egan), was also an Irish immigrant, having been born in Queen's County. John was their only son; they also had two daughters, Margaret and Ellen, who both died in infancy.

Michael Williams worked as a blacksmith and grocer, also operating a boarding house, until his death in 1830. The following year, John's mother married Michael Keyes, with whom she had two children.

At the age of four, Williams started at a public school near Fort Hill. From 1827 to 1833, he attended a Catholic school in the basement of the original Cathedral of the Holy Cross on Franklin Street. During this time, he also acted as an errand boy in the office of The Jesuit (now The Pilot).

Williams was then sent by Bishop Benedict Joseph Fenwick to begin his studies for the priesthood at the minor seminary of Montreal, run by the Sulpicians. He remained there until 1841, when he began his theological studies at Saint-Sulpice Seminary in Paris.

== Priesthood ==
On May 17, 1845, Williams was ordained a priest by Denis Auguste Affre, the Archbishop of Paris. Upon his return to Boston, he was appointed an assistant at the Cathedral of the Holy Cross, where he oversaw the Sunday school and weekday catechism classes. He served as rector of the cathedral from January 1856 until July 1857, when he became pastor of St. James Church on Harrison Avenue. During his tenure at St. James, he reduced the parish's debt and grew the parish into the largest Catholic congregation in Boston.

In addition to his pastoral responsibilities, Williams was named vicar general of the Diocese of Boston by Bishop John Bernard Fitzpatrick in 1857. As vicar general, he oversaw the closing of Holy Cross Cathedral in 1860 and the purchase of a Unitarian church at Castle and Washington Streets as a pro-cathedral in 1862. However, the outbreak of the American Civil War and the failing health of Bishop Fitzpatrick put plans for a new cathedral on hold.

== Episcopal career ==
=== Bishop of Boston ===
In 1865, Bishop Fitzpatrick sought a coadjutor bishop with the right of succession due to his poor health. In October of that year, the bishops of the ecclesiastical province of New York (of which the Diocese of Boston was then part) submitted to Rome a terna, or list of three candidates, that included Williams, Peter J. Blenkinsop, and the latter's brother William A. Blenkinsop. Williams was nominated by the Congregation for the Propagation of the Faith (which then oversaw the affairs of the Church in the United States) the following December. On January 9, 1866, his nomination was confirmed by Pope Pius IX, who also gave him the honorary position of titular bishop of Tripolis.

The papal bull of Williams's appointment arrived in Boston on February 9, 1866. However, Fitzpatrick died four days later on February 13, and Williams automatically succeeded him as the fourth Bishop of Boston. He received his episcopal consecration on the following March 11 at St. James Church from Archbishop John McCloskey, with Bishops John J. Conroy and John Loughlin serving as co-consecrators.

As bishop, Williams attended the second Plenary Council of Baltimore (1866) and the First Vatican Council (1869–1870). Ground was broken for the new Cathedral of the Holy Cross on April 27, 1866 (the bishop's 44th birthday), and the cornerstone was laid on September 15, 1867. Due to the growth of the Diocese of Boston, the Diocese of Springfield in Massachusetts was erected in 1870 from Berkshire, Franklin, Hampshire, Hampden, and Worcester counties; and the Diocese of Providence was erected in 1872 from Bristol, Barnstable, Dukes, Nantucket, and parts of Plymouth counties.

=== Archbishop of Boston ===
In May 1874, the archbishops of Baltimore, New York, Cincinnati, and St. Louis petitioned Rome to elevate Boston to the rank of a metropolitan archdiocese (along with Philadelphia, Milwaukee, and Santa Fe). Pius IX confirmed this elevation on February 12, 1875, making Williams the first Archbishop of Boston. On the following May 2, Williams received the pallium from Cardinal McCloskey (who had originally consecrated him a bishop) in a ceremony that was attended by 400,000 individuals, including Governor William Gaston and Mayor Samuel C. Cobb.

The new archbishop dedicated the new cathedral on December 8, 1875. He then turned his attention to establishing Boston's own seminary. After the purchase of a 26-acre estate in Brighton in 1880, the construction of St. John's Seminary was completed in 1883 and a charter was obtained from the Massachusetts General Court. The seminary opened on September 22, 1884, with 32 students. It was originally staffed by the Sulpicians (who had taught Williams as a seminarian), and John Baptist Hogan served as its first rector. In October 1885, Williams bought a nearby 18-acre estate for a house for pre-theology students, which was dedicated in 1890.

From November to December 1884, Williams attended the third Plenary Council of Baltimore. It was rumored that he would be created a cardinal by Pope Leo XIII, but he declined to be considered for any such honor, writing to Denis J. O'Connell in September 1890, "If you hear anything said about my name in connection with any new offices, you will place me under obligations by putting a stop to it."

== Views ==
Williams was known for his taciturn and conciliatory personality. He was described by one of his contemporaries, Archbishop Michael Corrigan of New York, as "always cool and prudent."

In the late 19th century, the Catholic bishops of the United States were generally divided between conservatives, like Archbishop Corrigan and Bishop Bernard John McQuaid, who favored strict adherence to Vatican policies and traditions; and liberals, like Archbishop John Ireland and Cardinal James Gibbons, who supported reform and adapting the Church to American values. Williams was viewed as a moderate, and he had close friendships with both Gibbons and McQuaid. During Corrigan’s feud with Edward McGlynn, Williams supported the archbishop's authority over the priest but opposed Corrigan's efforts to place Progress and Poverty on the Index of Forbidden Books.

== Death and legacy ==
As Williams advanced in age, he received William Henry O'Connell, then Bishop of Portland, as his coadjutor archbishop in 1906.

After returning from a vacation at Bishop McQuaid's farm in Hemlock Lake, New York, Williams developed a digestive disorder. Shortly afterward, he died at the archbishop's residence in Boston on August 30, 1907, at the age of 85. His Requiem Mass was celebrated on the following September 4 by Cardinal Gibbons, with Archbishop O'Connell delivering the eulogy. He was then buried in the crypt of the Cathedral of the Holy Cross.

As of 2025, Williams remains the longest-serving leader of the Archdiocese of Boston in history, having served for 41 years and 172 days. At the beginning of his tenure in 1866, the diocese had 116 priests and 109 churches to serve a Catholic population of approximately 300,000. By the time of his death in 1907, the archdiocese had 598 priests, 244 churches, and 850,000 Catholics.

Archbishop Williams High School in Braintree, which is named in his honor, opened in 1949.

== Sources ==
- Lord, Robert H. (1944). History of the Archdiocese of Boston. Vol. III. New York: Sheed & Ward.
- O'Connor, Thomas H. (1998). Boston Catholics: A History of the Church and Its People. Boston: Northeastern University Press.

== Episcopal succession ==
Catholic Church titles
Preceded by Bishop John Bernard Fitzpatrick	4th Bishop of Boston; 1866–1875	Boston elevated to Archdiocese
New title	1st Archbishop of Boston; 1875–1907	Succeeded by Cardinal William Henry O'Connell
