= Cathedral of the Holy Cross (Boston) =

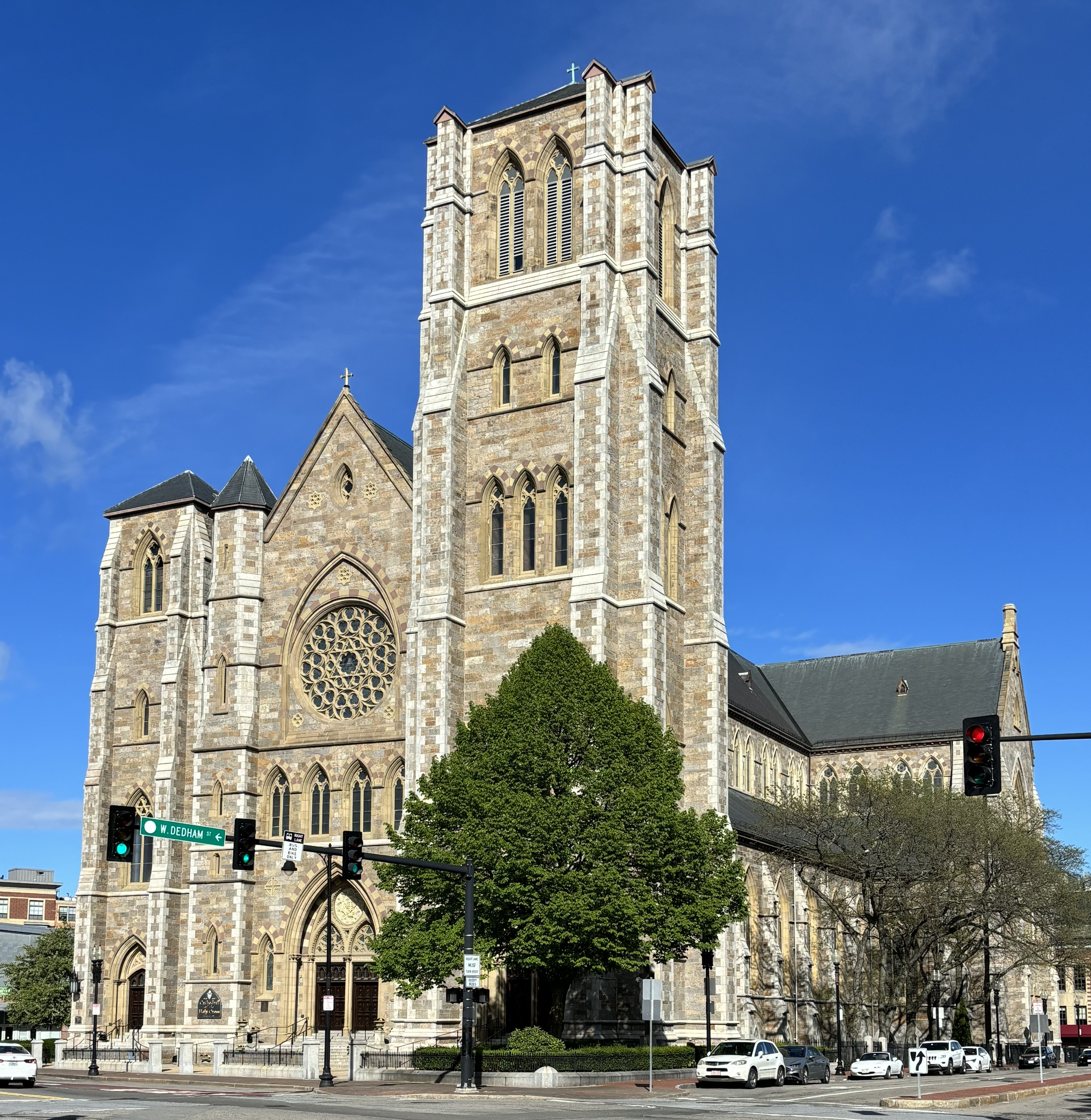
- Cathedral of the Holy Cross as seen from Washington Street (2024)
- Cathedral of the Holy Cross
- 42.340693°N 71.069344°W
- Location: 1400 Washington Street; Boston, Massachusetts
- Country: United States
- Denomination: Catholic
- Sui iuris church: Latin Church
- Tradition: Roman Rite
- Website: bostoncathedral.com

History
- Status: Cathedral (also parish church)
- Dedicated: December 8, 1875

Architecture
- Functional status: Active
- Architect: Patrick Keely
- Style: Gothic Revival
- Groundbreaking: April 29, 1866

Specifications
- Capacity: 1,700 people
- Length: 364 ft (111 m)
- Width: 90 ft (27 m)
- Height: 120 ft (37 m)
- Materials: Roxbury puddingstone and gray limestone

Administration
- Archdiocese: Boston

Clergy
- Archbishop: Most Reverend Richard Henning
- Rector: Very Reverend Christopher O’Connor
- Vicar: Reverend Rodrigo Martinez
- Cathedral of the Holy Cross
- U.S. National Register of Historic Places
- U.S. Historic district – Contributing property
- Part of: South End District
- NRHP reference No.: 73000324
- Added to NRHP: May 8, 1973

The Cathedral of the Holy Cross is the cathedral of the Catholic Archdiocese of Boston in Massachusetts. It is one of the largest Catholic churches in New England.

The cathedral is located in the city's South End on Washington Street. Construction of the cathedral started in 1866 and it was dedicated in 1875. As of 2026, the rector of the cathedral is Christopher K. O'Connor.

== History ==
During the first half of the 19th century, the Catholic population in Eastern Massachusetts grew tremendously. The cathedral for the Diocese of Boston, Holy Cross Cathedral, was built in 1808. By 1860, it was too small to fulfill the needs of the diocese. Bishop John Fitzpatrick wanted to replace it with a larger cathedral. However, with the outbreak of the American Civil War in 1861, he was unable to start its construction.

When the war ended in 1865, Bishop John Williams took over planning for the cathedral project. He decided to locate the building in the South End neighborhood of Boston. The South End was initially developed for Boston's emerging Protestant middle class. However, by the time the cathedral was being built, the South End was transitioning to a hub for new immigrants, mostly Irish, as the original residents moved out.To finance the new cathedral, the diocese sought donations from wealthy Catholics. It also established a Church Debt Society among working class Catholics; members would donate 50 cents a month for the cathedral construction. The diocese also sponsored dramatic readings, concerts, fairs and raffles to raise money.

The diocese broke ground on the new cathedral on April 29, 1866. Williams named it Holy Cross after the relic of the True Cross owned by the diocese. This relic was a wooden splinter said to have come from the cross used in the crucifixion of Christ. Williams, now archbishop of Boston, dedicated Holy Cross Cathedral on December 8, 1875.

After Cardinal William O’Connell died in April 1944, his body was held in requiem for five days at Holy Cross Cathedral. Over 250,000 people viewed the body. Twenty-five hundred people attended his funeral mass inside Holy Cross, with 10,000 additional attendees outside the cathedral.

Cardinal Richard Cushing in January 1964 celebrated a requiem mass at Holy Cross for US President John F. Kennedy, who had been assassinated in Dallas, Texas, in November 1963. The mass was taped and broadcast nationally on radio and television. During the mass, the Boston Symphony Orchestra accompanied the Mozart Requiem.

On October 1, 1979, Pope John Paul II held a 38-minute prayer service for 2,000 priests in the cathedral during his first papal visit to the United States. Mother Teresa visited Holy Name in 1988, where she spoke about her charitable missions.

A janitor in July 2010 discovered that someone had stolen the relic of the True Cross. The thief had pried open its compartment at the base of a hanging cross. A Vermont man in August 2010 surrendered the relic to the Vermont State Police, saying that he received it from another man. The police returned the relic to the archdiocese, which now displayed only on special occasions.

In April 2013, the cathedral hosted an interfaith prayer vigil in memory of the victims of the 2013 Boston Marathon bombing. US President Barack Obama delivered the eulogy.

In 2017, the archdiocese undertook the first major renovation of the cathedral since its construction. The contractors removed 8,000 square feet of oak flooring, replacing it with stone. The pews were restored, the electrical system was updated, a fire protection system was provided and air conditioning was installed. The $26 million renovation was completed in April 2019.

An Attleboro, Massachusetts, man in October 2023 vandalized the large crucifix mounted on the cathedral lawn, causing $20,000 in damage.

== Cathedral ==
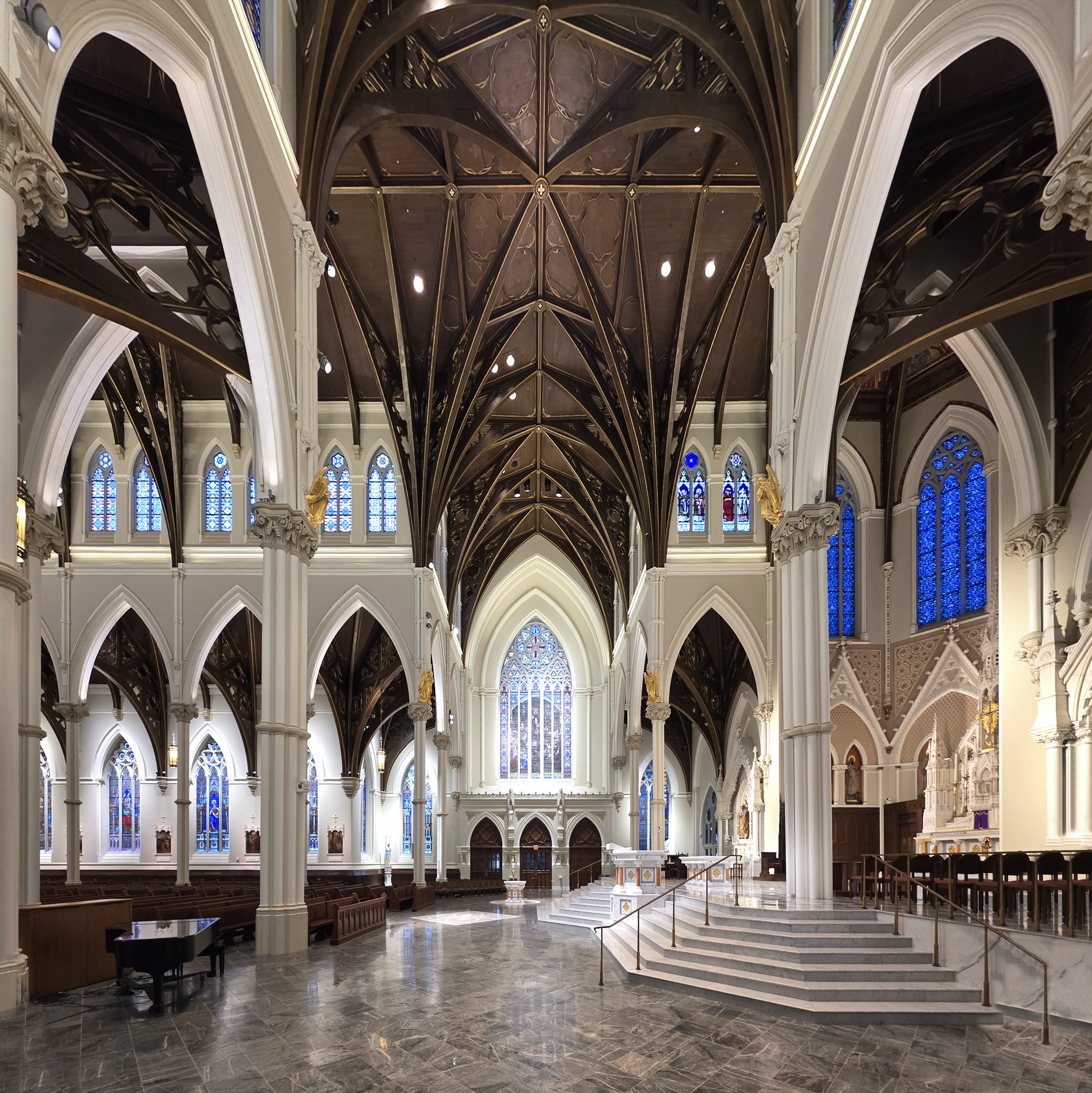
View from the transept

=== Architecture ===
The Cathedral of the Holy Cross was designed in the Gothic Revival style by the architect Patrick Keely, who built many churches around the country. Supervision of the construction fell largely to Keely and his assistant, architect John A. Dempwolf.

The cathedral is 120 ft (37 m) tall, 364 ft (111 m) in length and 90 ft (27 m) wide at the transepts. The original plan called for the building of two towers on the building, but they were never realized. The building covers 50,000 square feet (4,600 m^{2}) and has a seating capacity of 2000 in the main level. The cathedral contains an oratory for smaller services in the lower level. Until the completion of the Cathedral of St. Joseph in Hartford, Connecticut in 1957, Holy Cross was the largest cathedral in New England.

The cathedral is constructed of Roxbury puddingstone and gray limestone. The builders incorporated some brick in the arch over the front door from the Ursuline convent that was burned during the anti-Catholic 1834 riots in Charlestown.A planned western spire was never completed.

=== Pipe organ ===
The Cathedral of the Holy Cross owns an opus 801 pipe organ from the E. and G. G. Hook & Hastings Company of Boston that was installed in 1875. When the organ was updated in 1929, the archdiocese replaced the organ console with one taken from a theater.

In 2003, the Andover Organ Company of Lawrence, Massachusetts, built a new opus R-394 console for the organ. It is a replica of the original three-manual console. The company also updated the organ wiring

== Parish ==
The Cathedral parish consists of large English- and Spanish-speaking congregations. The parish also includes three archdiocese-wide congregations:

- Ge'ez Rite, practiced by Ethiopian, Eritrean, and Egyptian Catholics. These congregations moved to the cathedral in 1994 from Holy Trinity Parish
- German Apostolate, moved to the cathedral in 2008
- Tridentine Mass Catholic community, moved to the cathedral in 2008

== Cathedral High School ==
In 1927, Cardinal William O'Connell founded Cathedral High School adjacent to the church. The Sisters of St. Joseph operated the institution. The school remains at this site today.

== Gallery ==
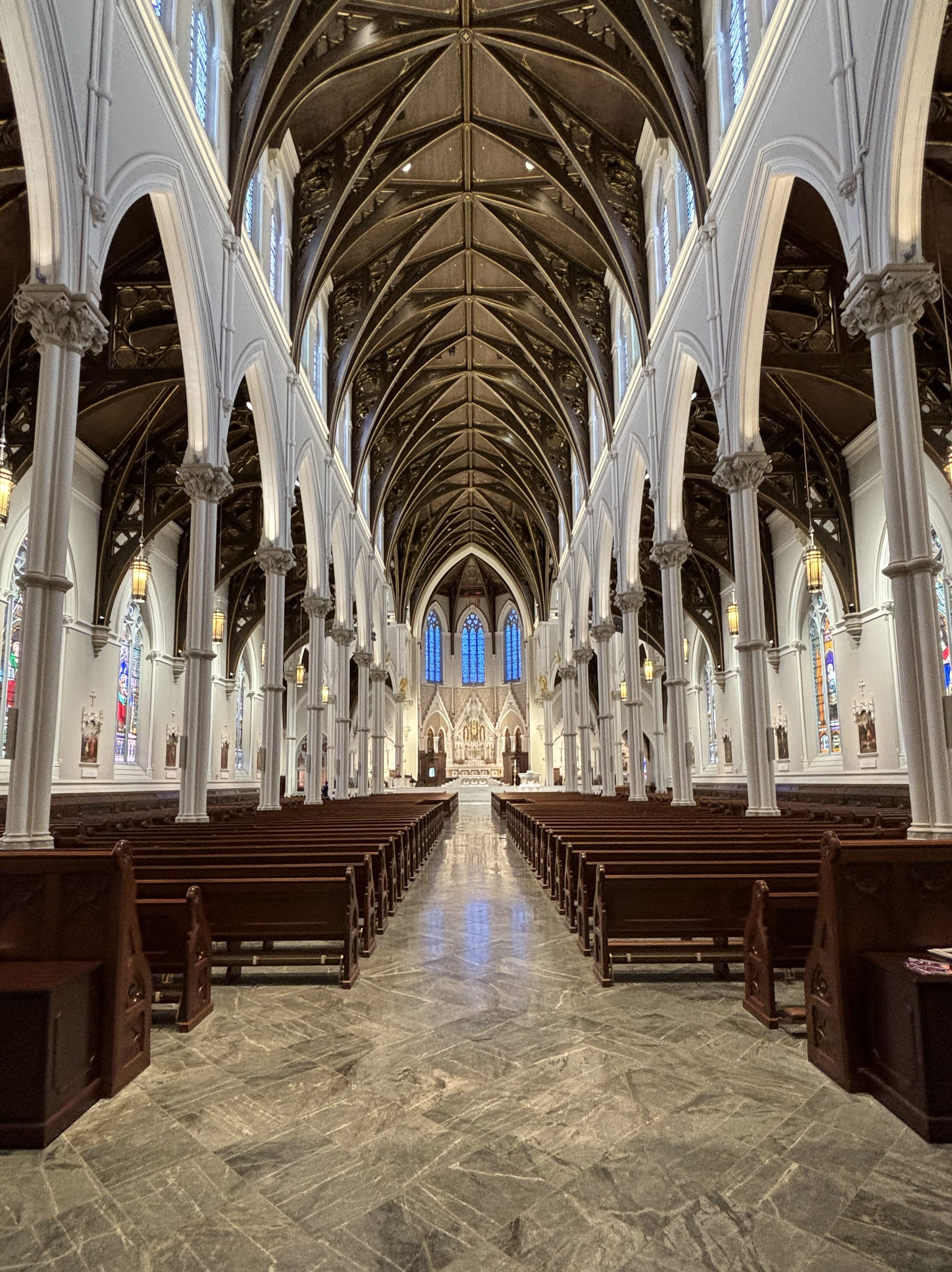
View from the loft to the sanctuary

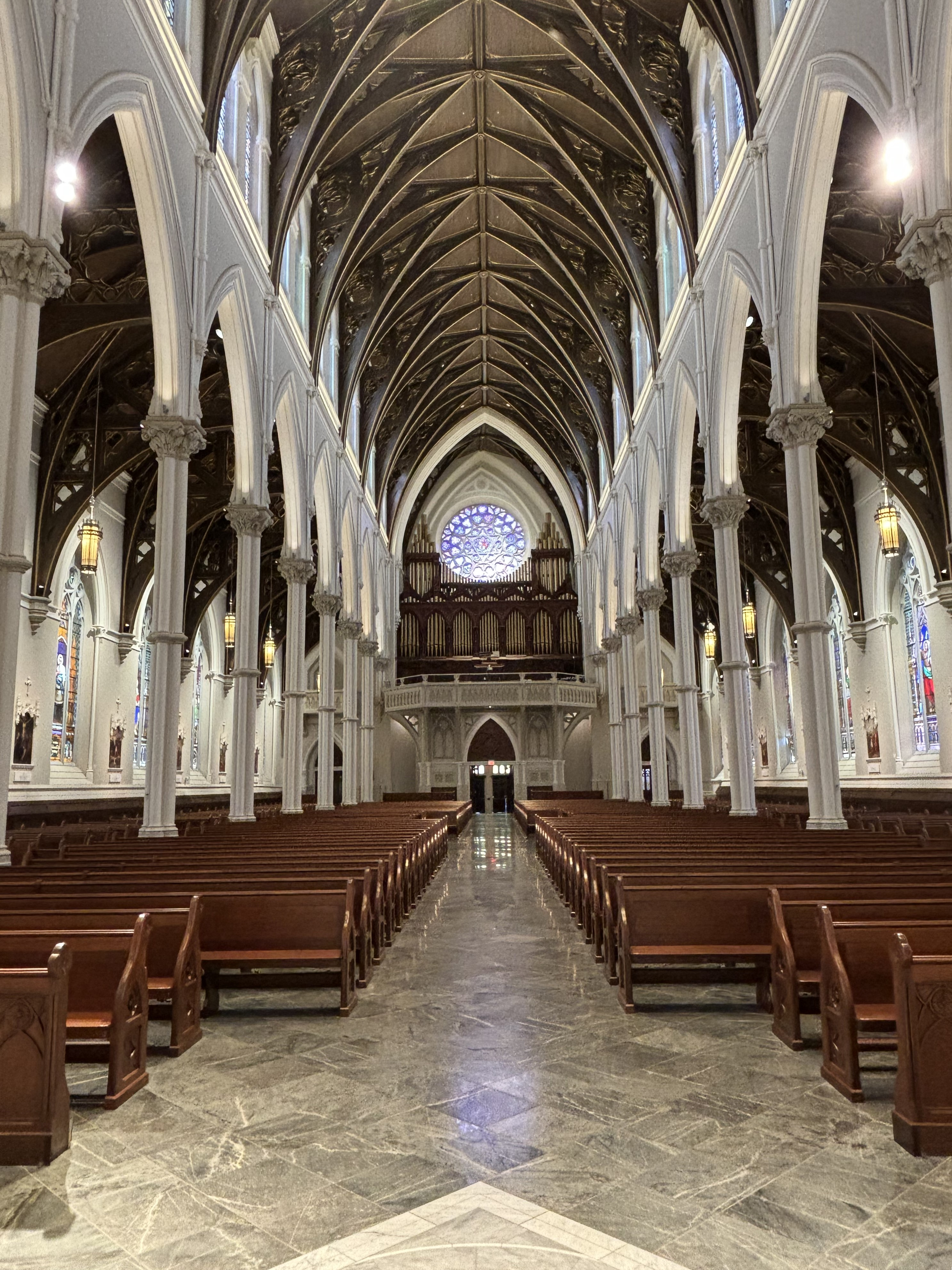
View from the sanctuary to the loft

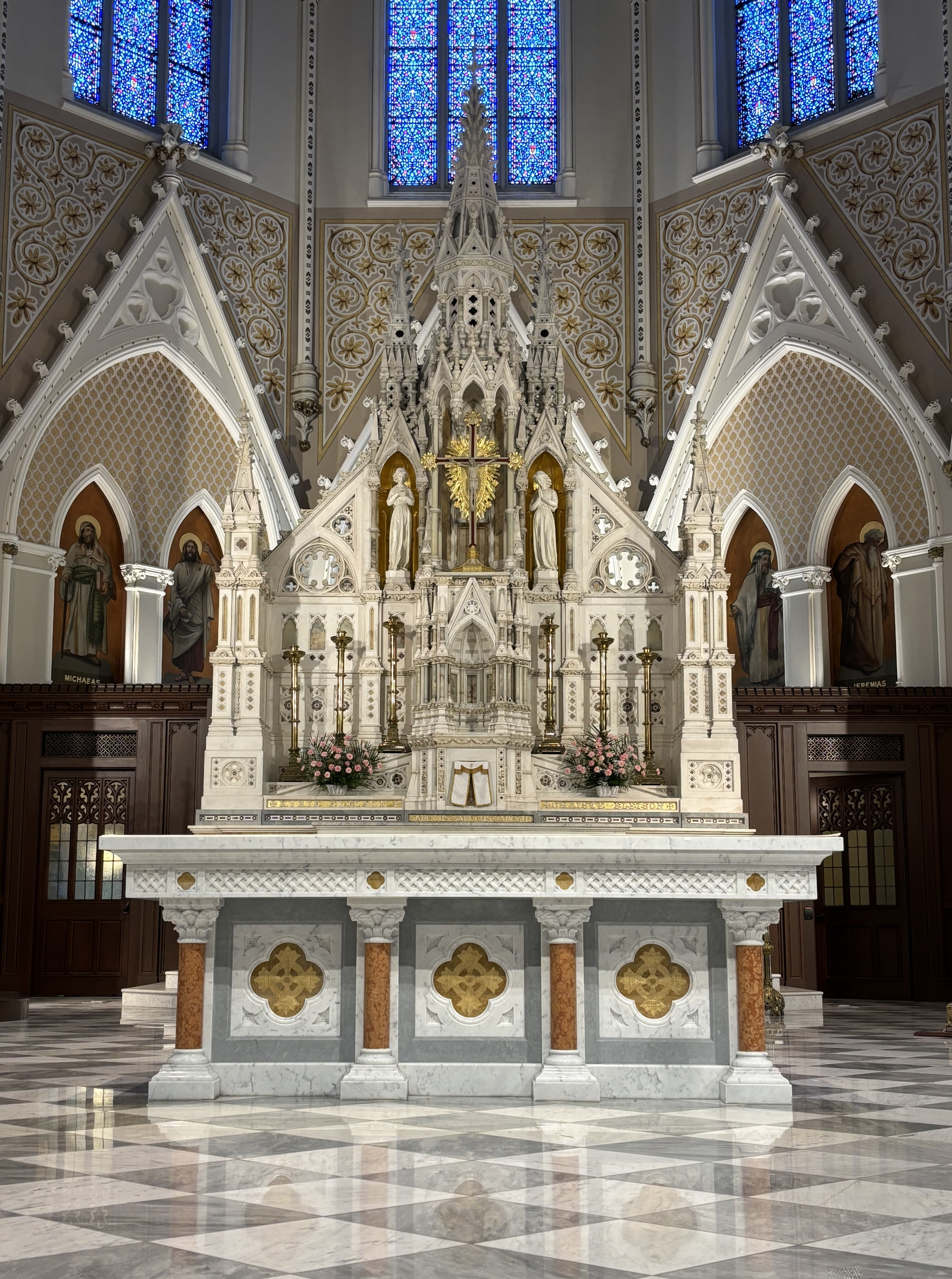
Altar and reredos

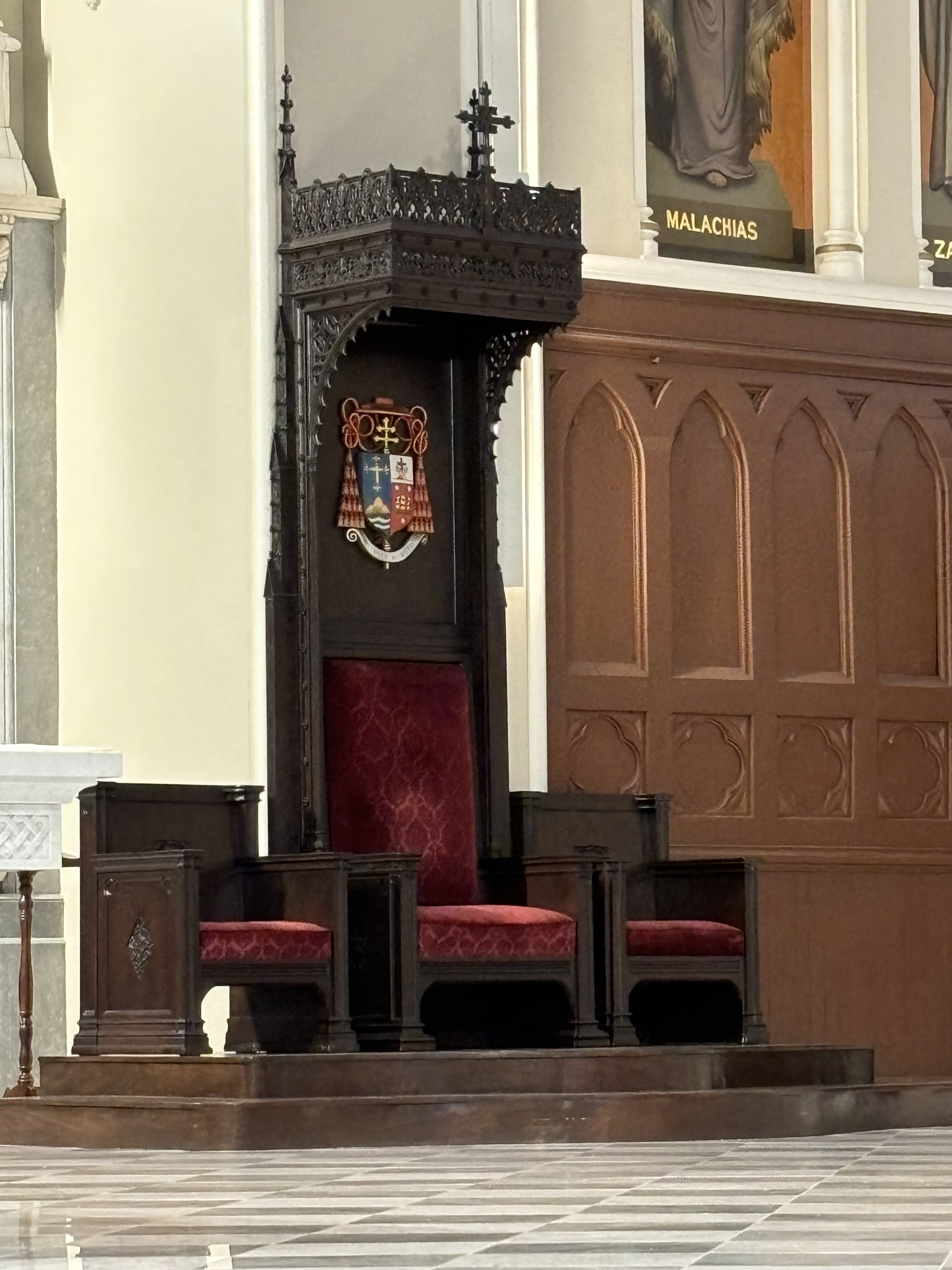
Cathedra

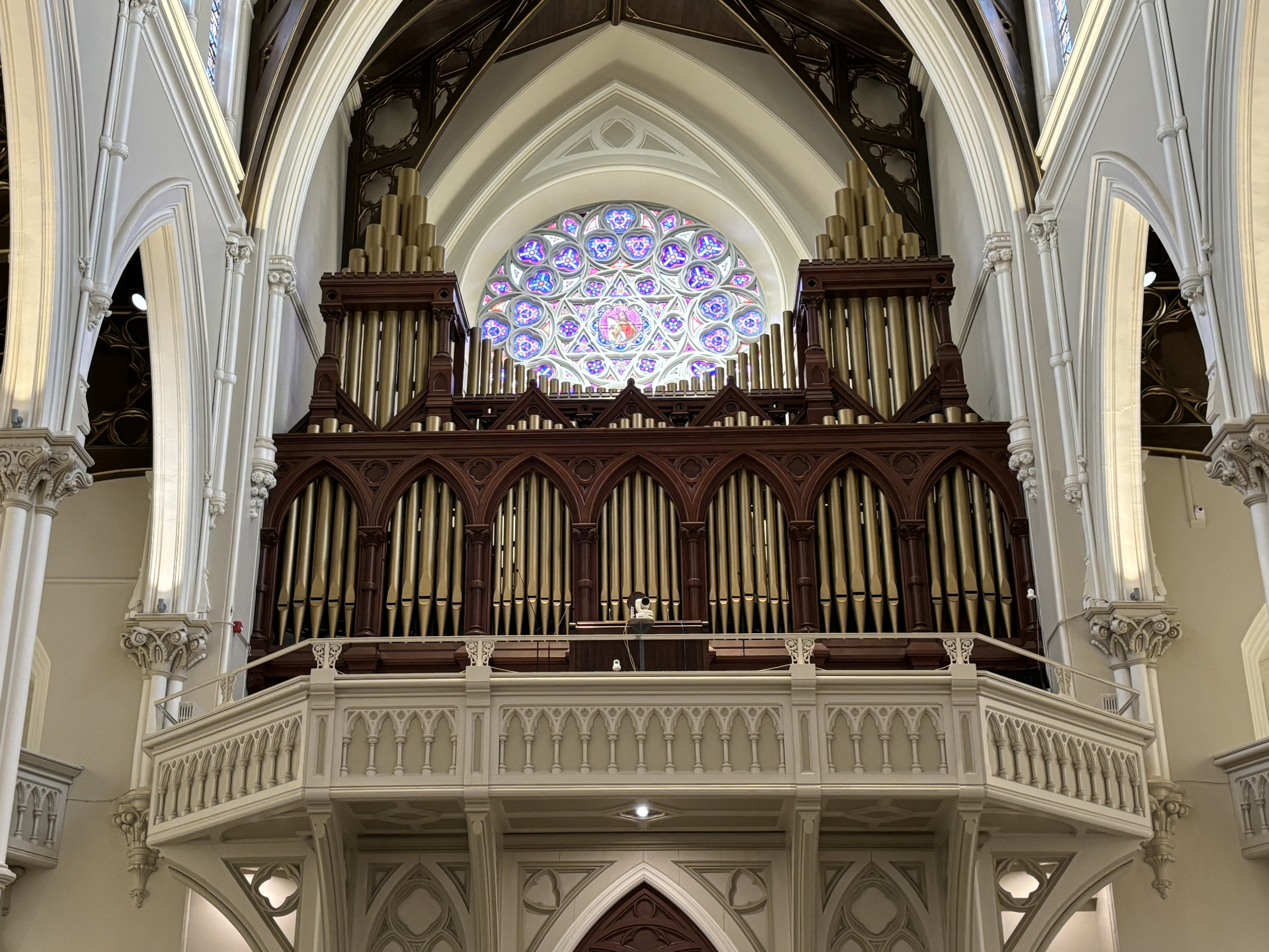
Hook & Hastings pipe organ

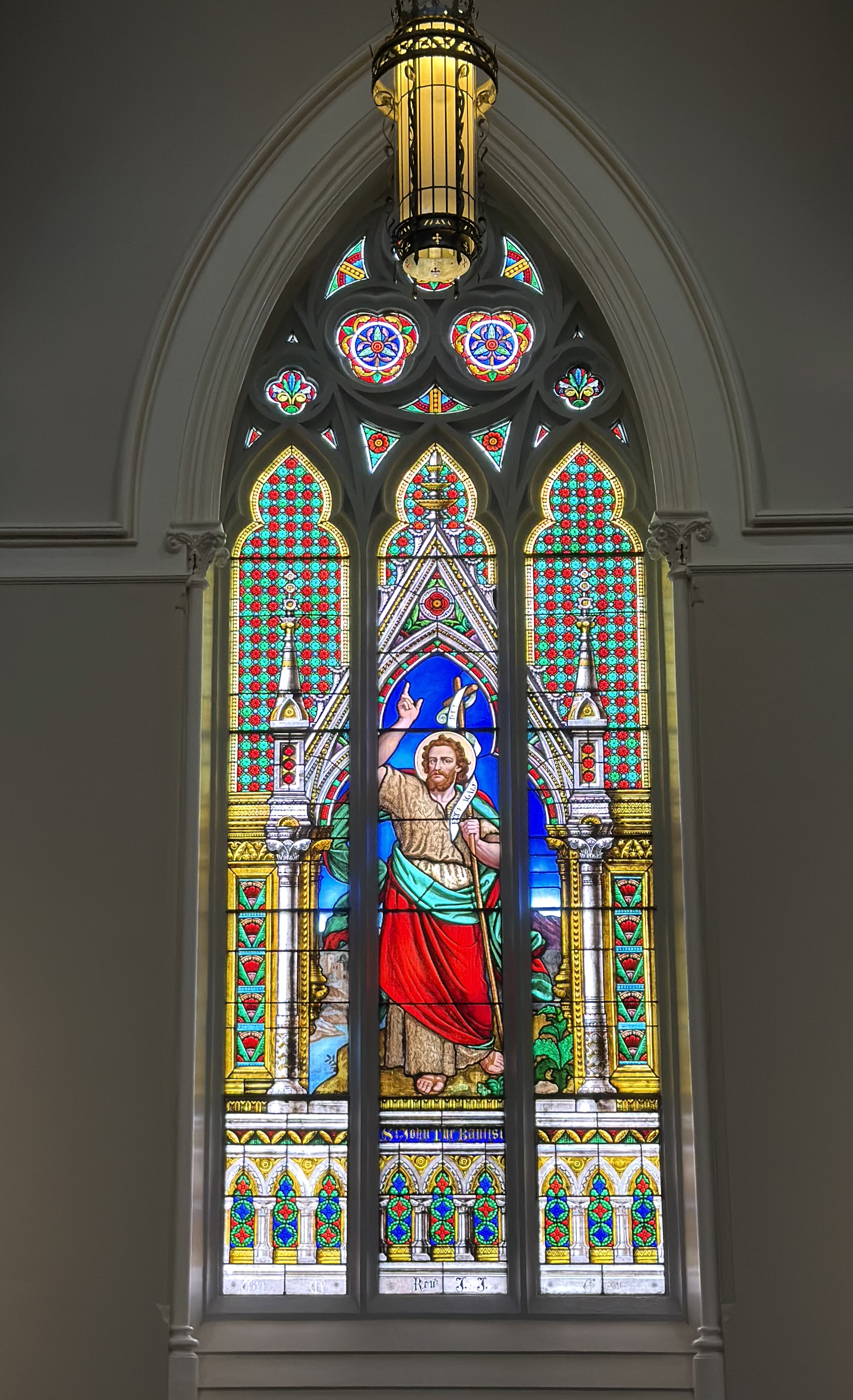
Window depicting John the Baptist

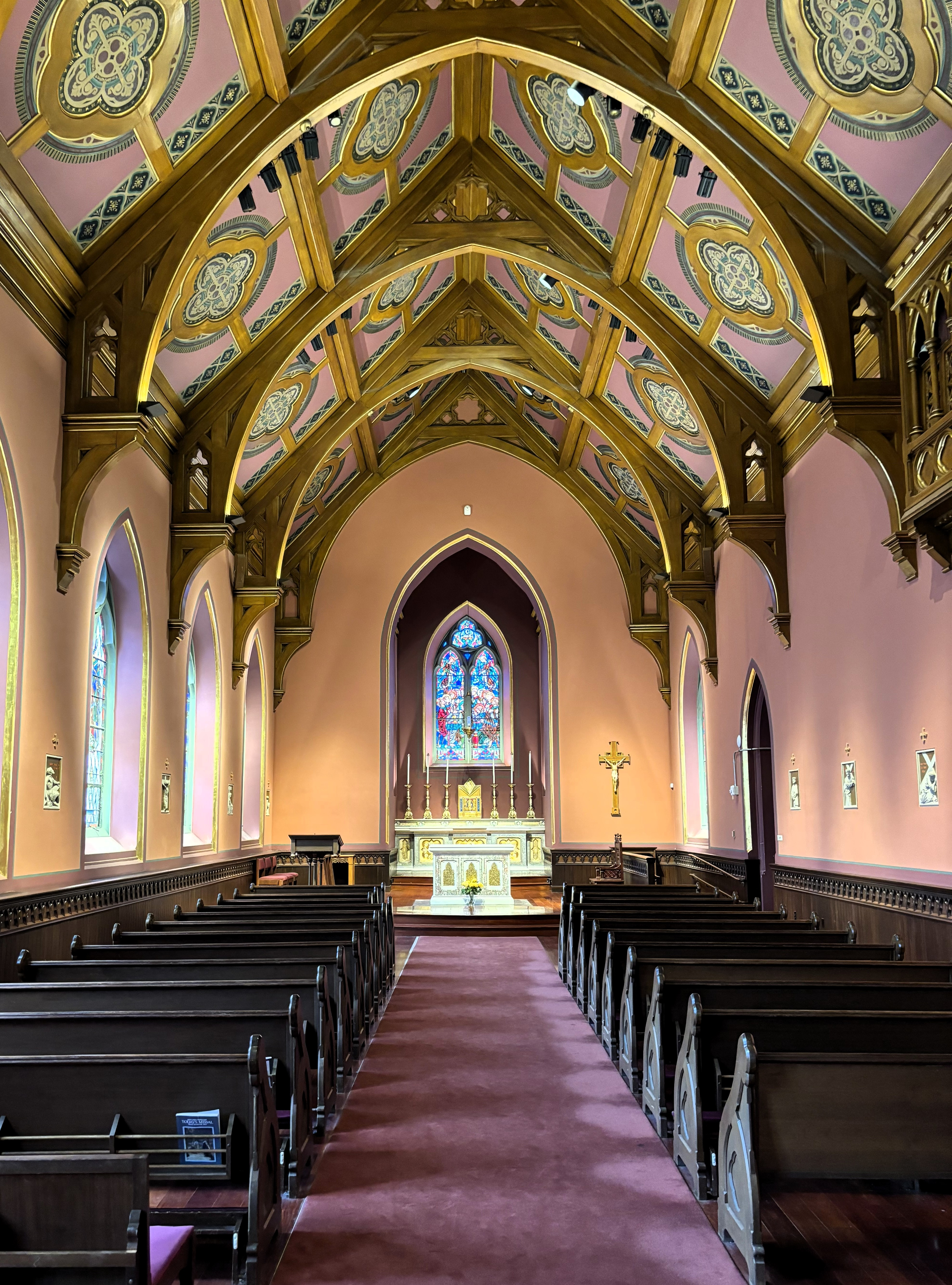
Blessed Sacrament Chapel

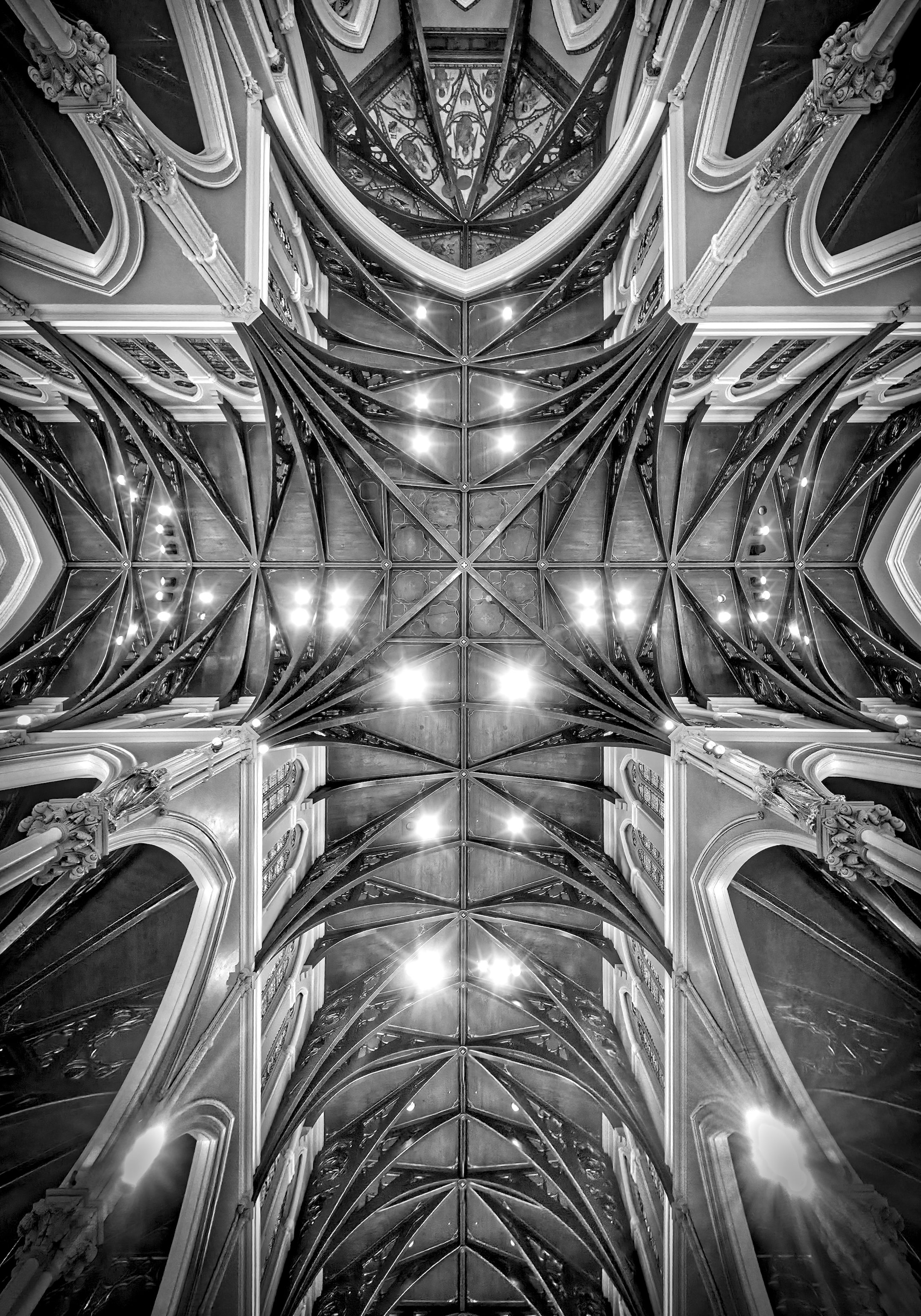
Cathedral vault

== See also ==
- List of churches in the Archdiocese of Boston
- List of Catholic cathedrals in the United States
- List of cathedrals in the United States
