= DeSalvo =

DeSalvo or De Salvo is an Italian surname. Notable people with the surname include:

== People ==
- Albert DeSalvo (1931–1973), American serial killer known as the Boston Strangler
- Barbara De Salvo, electronics engineer
- Karen DeSalvo (born 1966), American federal official
- Louise DeSalvo (1942–2018), American writer and professor
- Matt DeSalvo (born 1980), American baseball player
- Roman De Salvo (born 1965), American artist and sculptor
- Russ DeSalvo, American songwriter, musician and record producer

== Fictional characters ==
- Charlie DeSalvo, on the TV show Highlander: The Series

== See also ==
- DiSalvo, a list of people with the surname DiSalvo or Di Salvo
- Salvo (surname)
