= Jennifer Donahue =

Jennifer Donahue is an American political analyst and journalist. She was the political director of the New Hampshire Institute of Politics at Saint Anselm College. After more than a decade as a political reporter, analyst and producer, Donahue is known for appearing on National Public Radio, ABC World News Tonight, NBC Nightly News, Nightline (US news program), CBS Evening News, and Anderson Cooper 360°.

She served as communications director for the New England Clean Energy Council until 2012, and is now a communications officer in the Massachusetts state courts. Donahue is an expert-in-residence at the Eisenhower Institute of Gettysburg College, based in Washington, D.C. She has previously taught political science for Suffolk University in Boston, during the fall semester in 2011.

Donahue is frequently quoted in Newsweek, The Washington Post, New York Times, USA Today, Boston Globe, and participates in live interviews on National Public Radio.

== Personal history ==
A graduate of Cornell University in 1989, Donahue refers to herself as a political analyst.

== Political career ==
=== 1990s ===
Jennifer Donahue began work at C-SPAN in Washington, D.C. under her first boss, Brian Lamb. Her chance to field produce the Clarence Thomas/Anita Hill hearings in the Senate in 1991 sparked her interest in gaining access to "what was happening behind the scenes."

In 1992 Donahue covered the presidential race for C-SPAN. After the 1992 presidential race, Donahue began a job as the press secretary for United States Senator Hank Brown.

From 1995 to 1999, Donahue worked as a producer, writer and interviewer for CNN's Inside Politics. In 1996, she covered the presidential race for CNN.

=== 2000 election ===
During the 2000 presidential election, Donahue covered the race as both a freelance reporter for Newsweek and an on-air political analyst for MSNBC. She also worked for New Hampshire's WNDS-TV as a reporter. During the election cycle, Donahue interviewed all the major presidential candidates and moderated live debates and town hall meetings with Keyes, Bauer, Bradley and Gore.

== New Hampshire Institute of Politics - Saint Anselm College ==
Donahue joined Saint Anselm College in 2002. She taught a seminar titled "Pizza and Politics" on political news and analysis and moderates the "Granite State Public Policy Forum" series.

In June/July 2008, Donahue was named the political director for the New Hampshire Institute of Politics at Saint Anselm College; she resigned in 2009. Prior to that, Donahue was a senior adviser for political affairs.

== Harvard University's Institute of Politics ==
In the fall of 2008, Donahue was a resident fellow at Harvard Kennedy School's Institute of Politics. Her study group focused on an examination of the 2008 Obama-McCain general elections campaign as it occurred.

== Eisenhower Institute at Gettysburg College ==
Jennifer Donahue began lecturing, hosting events and appearing on television as an expert-in-residence on behalf of the Eisenhower Institute at Gettysburg College in the Spring of 2011, based in Washington, D.C. In January 2012, she hosted Agriculture Secretary Tom Vilsack on behalf of the Institute.
