= New Hampshire Institute of Politics =

Academic institute at Saint Anselm College

Coordinates: 42°59′12″N 71°29′55″W

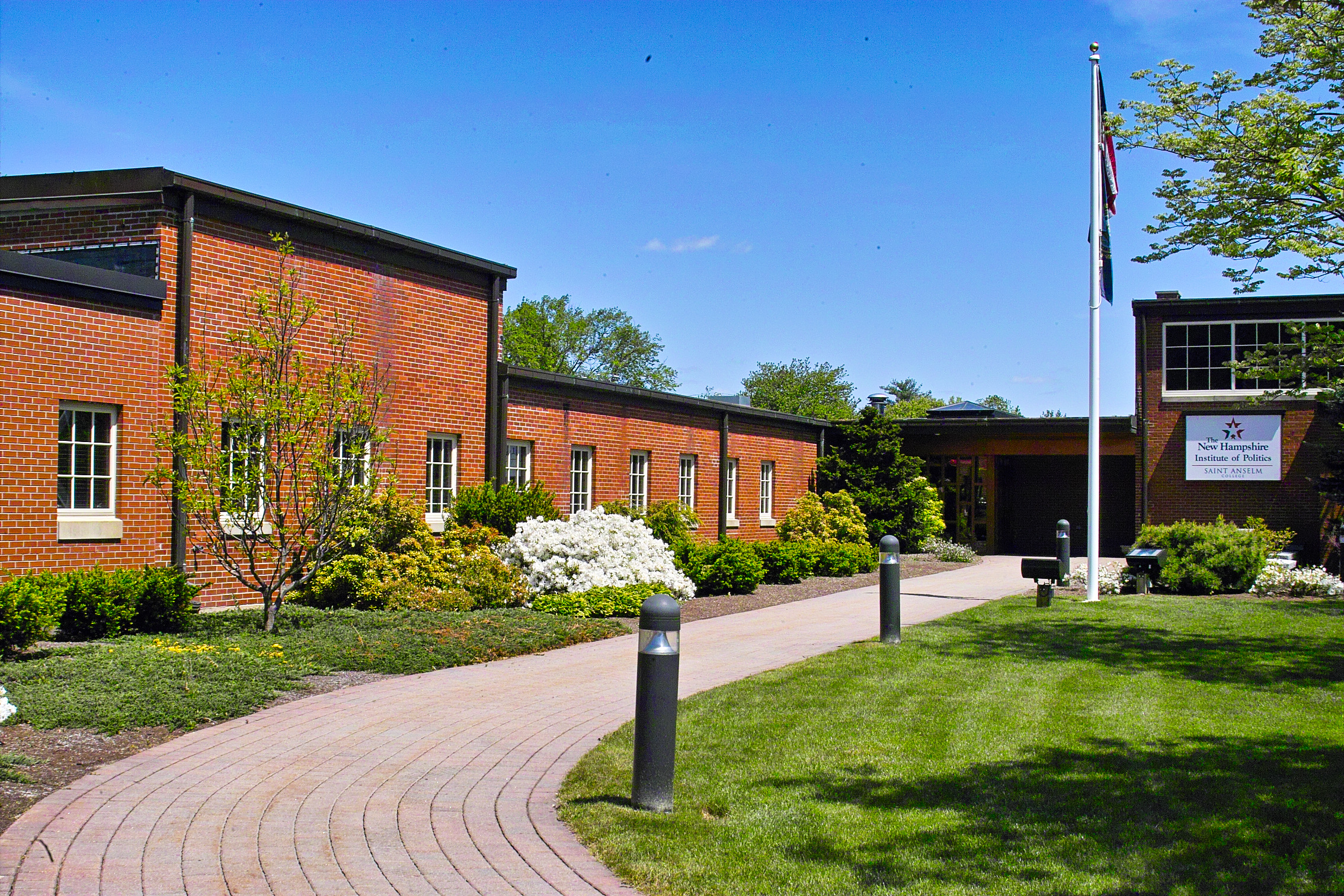
The west entrance of the NHIOP

The New Hampshire Institute of Politics (NHIOP) is an academic institute at Saint Anselm College in Goffstown, New Hampshire. Founded in 2001, the institute has hosted hundreds of potential candidates for the U.S. presidency.

== History ==
The New Hampshire Institute of Politics (NHIOP) was founded in 2001 through a nine million dollar grant secured by then U.S. Senator Judd Gregg from the National Institute of Standards and Technology. The idea of the Institute came from a series of conversations between Professors Kuehne and Manuel of the Saint Anselm College politics department and assistant vice president Anne Botteri. All involved believed in the potential the college could harness from the New Hampshire primary because of its traditions and location.

In December 1995, Fr. Jonathan DeFelice asked Professor Manuel, as chairman of the politics department, to chair a committee to study the question and to make recommendations. A proposal was presented to the Board of Trustees by fellow trustee and former Massachusetts Senate president Kevin B. Harrington. Passing by a unanimous vote, the institute was constructed in 2000 and dedicated on September 7, 2001.

Marc Ambinder, political editor of The Atlantic, described the role Saint Anselm plays in national politics by saying, "No one runs for president without speaking at St. A's New Hampshire Institute of Politics." U.S. News & World Report also ranked the college as the single, most popular location in New Hampshire for presidential candidates to visit. For over sixty years, the college has played host to hundreds of presidential aspirants. That activity has only increased since the NHIOP was established in 2001, founded on the basis that "educated and engaged citizens are vital for a healthy democracy." The NHIOP houses the politics department, as well as classroom space for use by all departments. The institute is credited with raising the national profile of the college by incorporating it in the New Hampshire primary, the first primary of the United States presidential election.

== Facilities ==
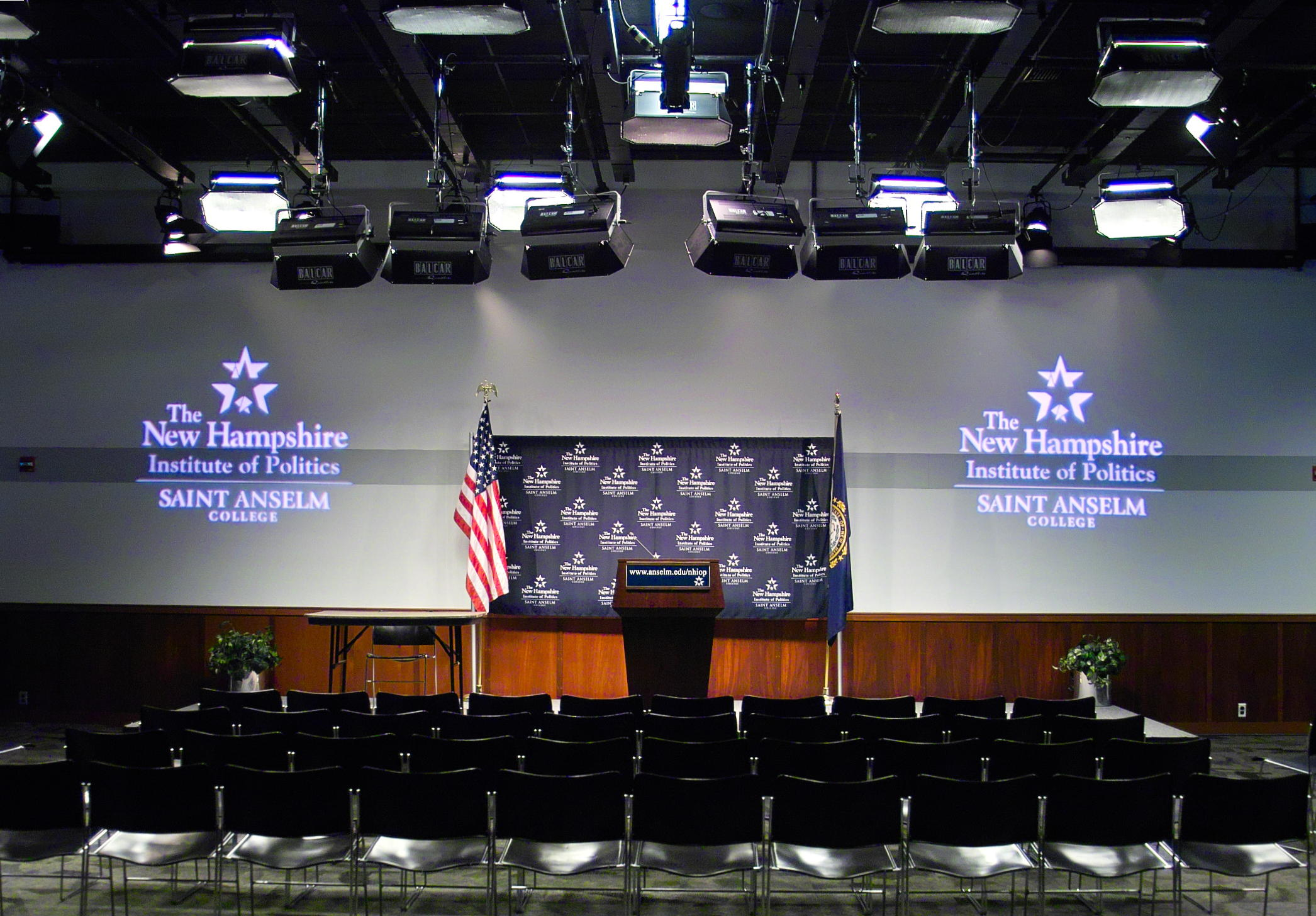
The main auditorium of the NHIOP

The Institute consists of a 20,000-square-foot (1,900 m^{2}) building built in 2001. The Institute contains six classrooms, four seminar rooms, an auditorium, television studio, offices for the college's department of politics and Institute administration, the Common Ground cafe, a research center, and a computer lab. All of the classrooms are "smart classrooms" equipped with interactive whiteboards, LCD projectors, and built in audio and video equipment. The television studio is the only live video production and broadcast studio in the Greater Manchester area. Television journalists can interview individuals, including Saint Anselm's experts, politicians, business and civic leaders, remotely from the studio without requiring a TV crew on site or the source to travel to the network. Operated in partnership with VideoLink, the studio is equipped with ReadyCam technology that allows VideoLink to control the camera and lighting remotely from their Boston headquarters.

== Programs and activities ==
The Washington Post recently referred to Saint Anselm College as "the Benedictine college with a box seat on America's most riveting political theater", as the college and institute have both played major roles in the New Hampshire primary. CNN contributor and former Harvard Institute of Politics chair Jennifer Donahue was the institute's political director from 2002 to 2009. The current director of the institute is Neil Levesque.

Steve Scully, host, senior producer, and political editor of C-SPANs Washington Journal, is among the directors of the institute.

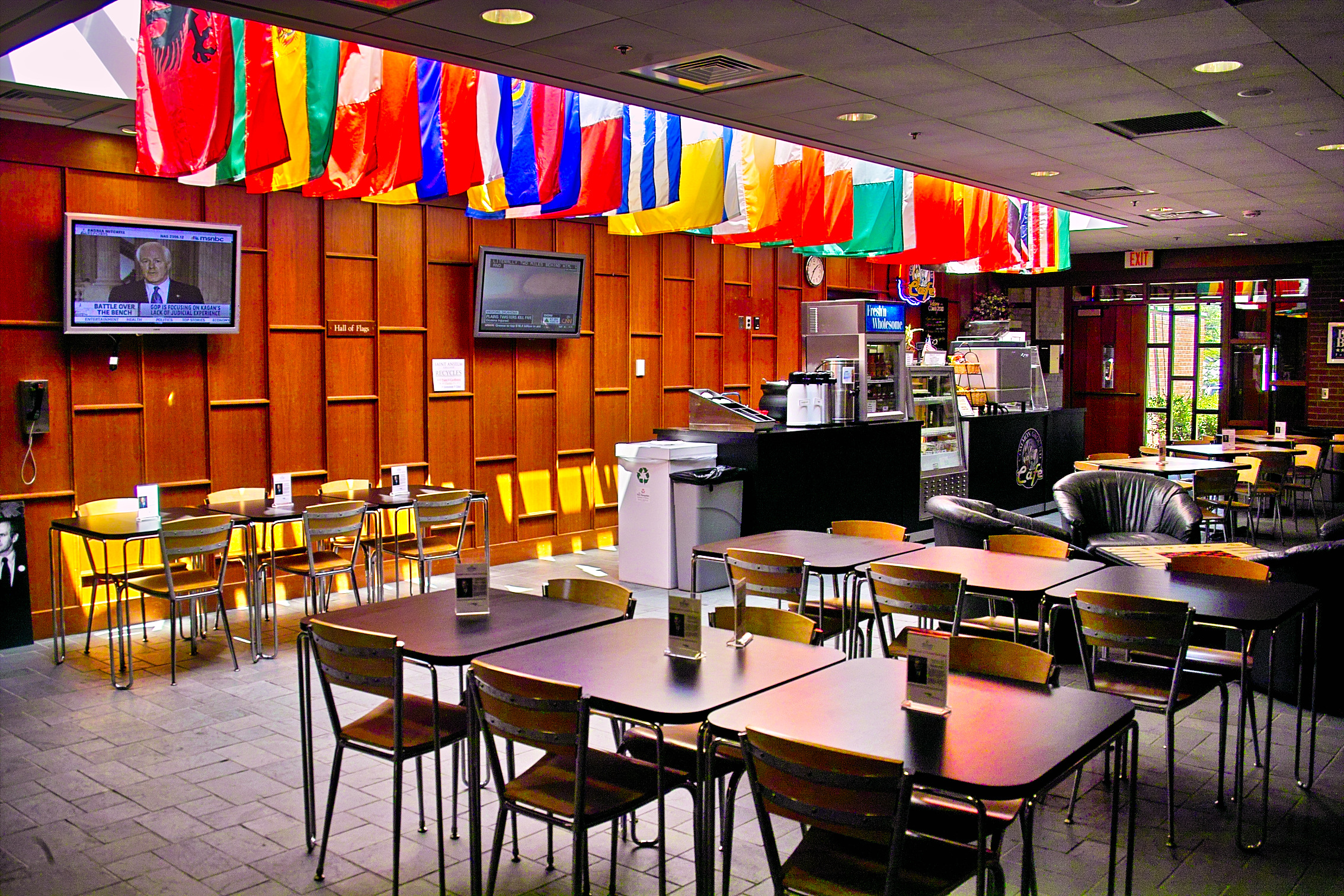
The "Commonground Cafe" at the NHIOP

The Kevin B. Harrington Student Ambassador Program is an academic program through the New Hampshire Institute of Politics; it is named after the late Massachusetts State Senator Kevin B. Harrington, who was a member of the Saint Anselm College Board of Trustees and an instrumental force in the creation of the New Hampshire Institute of Politics itself. Student Ambassadors play an important role in supporting special events, giving tours of the institute, welcoming and introducing presidential and congressional candidates, public figures and a range of scholars who headline the institute's special events and public programs.

Its youth programs are modeled after those of the Sorensen Institute for Political Leadership in Virginia.

The Public Advisory Board, established by Father Jonathan DeFelice in 2008 seeks to help the Institute expand its role in both state and national dialogues. Board members include U.S. Senator Judd Gregg (Chair), former United States Congressman Paul Hodes, New Hampshire Secretary of State Bill Gardner (Vice-Chair), Massachusetts Governor Charlie Baker, Time magazine's Mark Halperin, U.S. Senator Kelly Ayotte, and John Bridgeland, member of the White House Council for Community Solutions.

=== Presidential debates ===
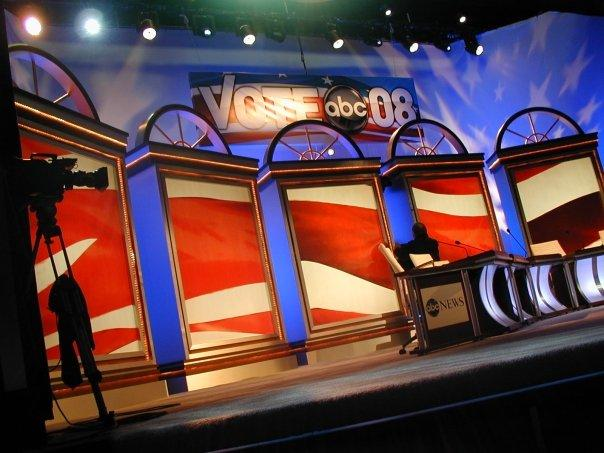
Saint Anselm College and Facebook debates in 2007

The college has hosted numerous national debates and campaign rallies since the 1950s. In 2003, Saint Anselm hosted a debate between the candidates for the Democratic Party nomination in the 2004 presidential election, and served as the Primary headquarters for the Fox News Network. Similarly, in June 2007 the college hosted two national debates, sponsored by CNN, for candidates of the Republican and Democratic Party. In 2008, the college hosted the back-to-back ABC/Facebook/WMUR debates on January 5, 2008. Saint Anselm College students volunteered and became "runners" for the Fox News, CNN and ABC debates; students have had the unique opportunity to meet many presidential candidates and media personalities. In his welcoming address to the class of 2012, President Father Jonathan DeFelice said, "Almost from the first day of classes you will have the opportunity that many other college students will not have – to meet candidates and media experts, political reporters and analysts from all over our country." On June 13, 2011, the college partnered with CNN, WMUR, and the New Hampshire Union Leader to host the first Republican presidential primary debate in New Hampshire for the 2012 campaign. Similarly, in January 2012, the college hosted an ABC national debate. On August 3, 2015, the college partnered with C-SPAN and a long and unusual list of co-sponsors to host a nationally broadcast candidate forum, three days before the first officially RNC-sanctioned debate on FOX.

=== Barack Obama and former presidents ===
The institute has attracted notable speakers, including then-presidential candidate Barack Obama and former presidents of the United States George W. Bush, Bill Clinton, George H. W. Bush, Ronald Reagan, Gerald Ford, Richard Nixon, and John F. Kennedy.

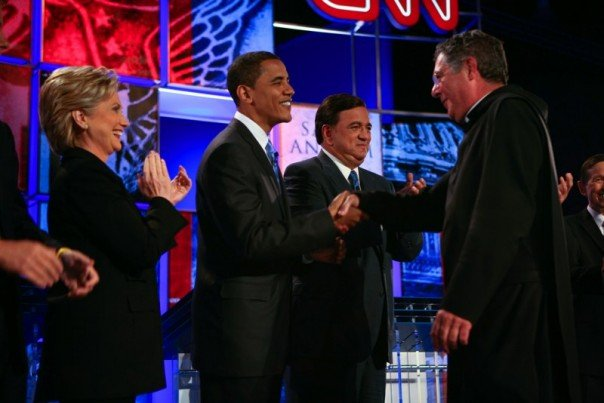
Saint Anselm College President Fr. Jonathan DeFelice shakes hands with then U.S. Senator Barack Obama.

President John F. Kennedy gave a historic speech at Saint Anselm College on March 5, 1960, regarding America's conduct in the new realities of the emerging Cold War. The speech was the first time that Kennedy detailed how American foreign policy should be conducted towards African nations, noting a hint of support for modern African nationalism by saying, "for we, too, founded a new nation on revolt from colonial rule." According to a Time magazine article from February 8, 1960,

"...a motorcade of students from St. Anselm's College gave him an earsplitting welcome from 35 automobile horns, then mobbed him with such enthusiasm that Jack had to climb into an open convertible in order to be seen. Afterward, the college kids dragged out a reluctant donkey (rented for $20 by the efficient Kennedy organization), then followed Kennedy into a supermarket, waving homemade college-humor signs (PUT JACK IN THE WHITE SHACK, PUT A NEW JOHN IN THE WHITE HOUSE)."

While at the college, Kennedy said the famous line, "I forgot my Nixon button."

The day after declaring his candidacy for the 1968 election, President Richard Nixon's first stop was at Saint Anselm College where a reception was held. At the college, on February 3, 1968, Nixon unveiled his campaign strategy regarding the Vietnam War by saying, "let's help them fight the war, and not fight the war for them." The ramifications of this policy, first voiced at the college had a profound effect on the 1968 presidential campaign and the war in Vietnam.

=== Former presidential candidates and other notable speakers ===
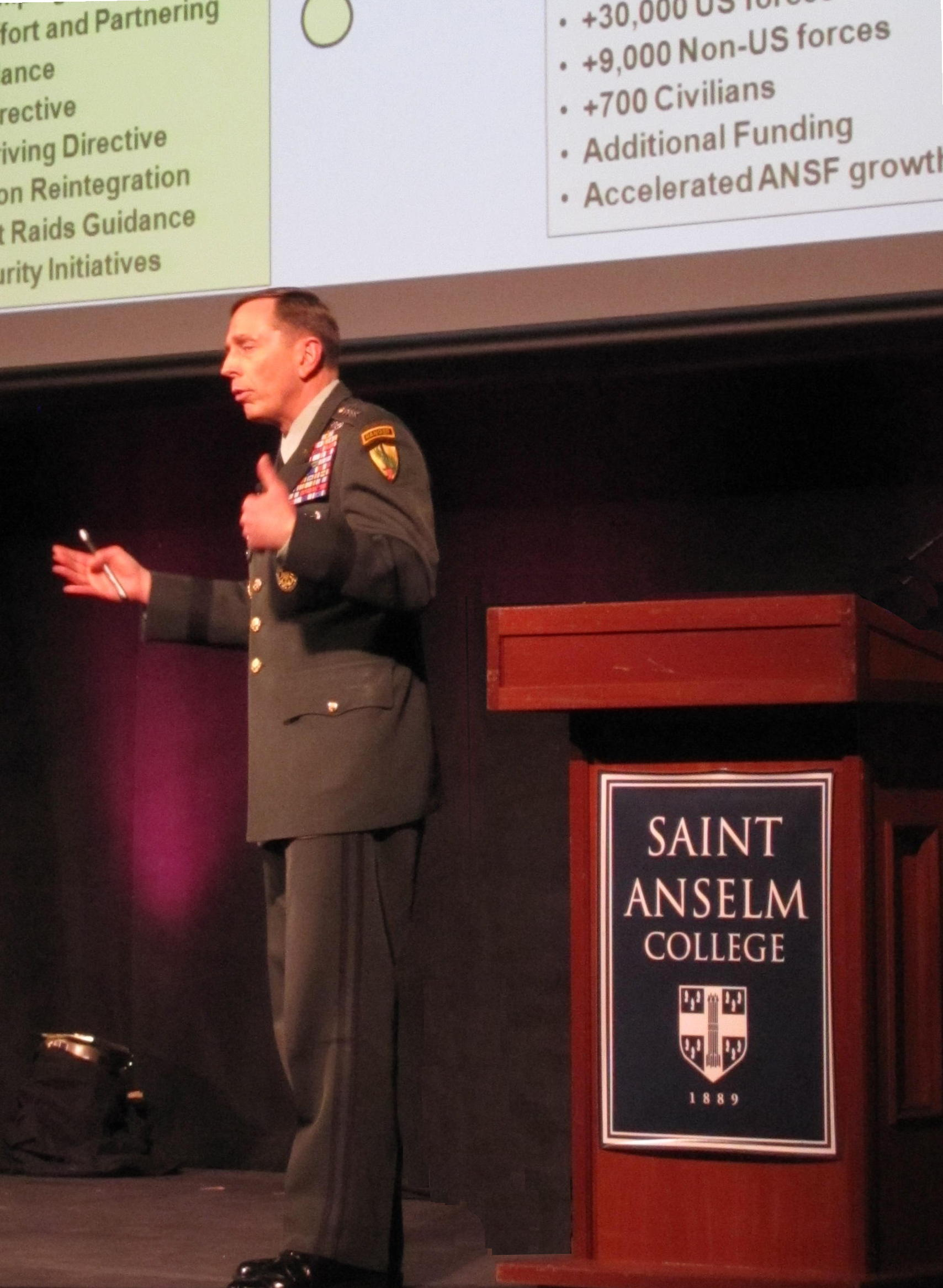
General David Petraeus in 2010

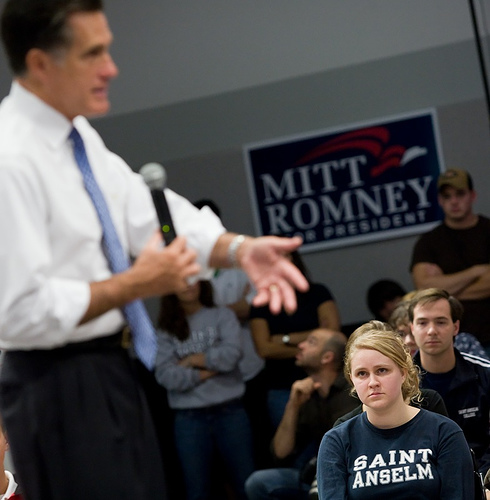
A Saint Anselm student listens to presidential candidate Mitt Romney in 2007.

Hundreds of presidential candidates have toured and spoken at the college over the past fifty years. More recent speakers have ranged from former Secretary of State and 2016 Democratic presidential nominee Hillary Clinton to the 2008 Republican nominee John McCain. In the weeks before the 2008 election, John McCain's comeback campaign returned to New Hampshire where McCain held a rally in Sullivan arena in front of a crowd of over two thousand students, faculty, staff and visitors from the community. A group of eight students painted the word "M-A-V-E-R-I-C-K" across their chests and lined up next to each other atop the stands behind McCain.

In March 2010, the former head of the U.S. Central Command and four star U.S. Army General David Petraeus lectured at the Dana Center for the Humanities through a NHIOP sponsored program; the change of venue was required because the institute's auditorium could not accommodate the six hundred plus students, faculty and staff in attendance. This lecture in particular generated national media attention as rumors spread about Petraeus planning to run for the 2012 presidential election. Petraeus highlighted how America has begun to implement the same counter insurgency strategy which worked in Iraq to Afghanistan.

The following candidates have participated in one of the many national debates held by the college over the years – former President of the United States Barack Obama, former New York senator Hillary Clinton, Arizona senator John McCain, Jon Huntsman, Kansas senator Sam Brownback, former Alaska senator Mike Gravel, Connecticut senator Joe Lieberman, former Democratic nominee for the 2004 election, John Kerry, former Massachusetts governor Mitt Romney, former Vermont governor Howard Dean, former Arkansas governor Mike Huckabee, New Mexico governor Bill Richardson, Ohio congressman Dennis Kucinich, Congressman Ron Paul, Ralph Nader, General Wesley Clark and many more.

Former Republican candidate Sam Brownback's visit attracted the negative attention of the national media as the image of Brownback at the podium speaking to a mostly empty room epitomized his failing candidacy. In 1972, the eventual Democratic nominee for United States presidential election George McGovern visited the college and after his speech jokingly declared he would become a vice presidential candidate, as he was clearly the front runner.

Inside the institute's main hallway hangs over one hundred images that represent the college's role in the political process; former Missouri congressman Richard Gephardt once recognized a picture of an elderly woman holding a sign "Gephardt for President" in a rather emotional moment as his own mother. It is not uncommon to run into current New Hampshire senator Jeanne Shaheen, former senator John E. Sununu, or former New Hampshire governors Judd Gregg, Craig Benson and John Lynch in the hallways, guest lecturing in classrooms or leaving the politics department after conversing with faculty; some faculty are politicians – New Hampshire state Senator Lou D'Allesandro is a faculty member of the politics department.

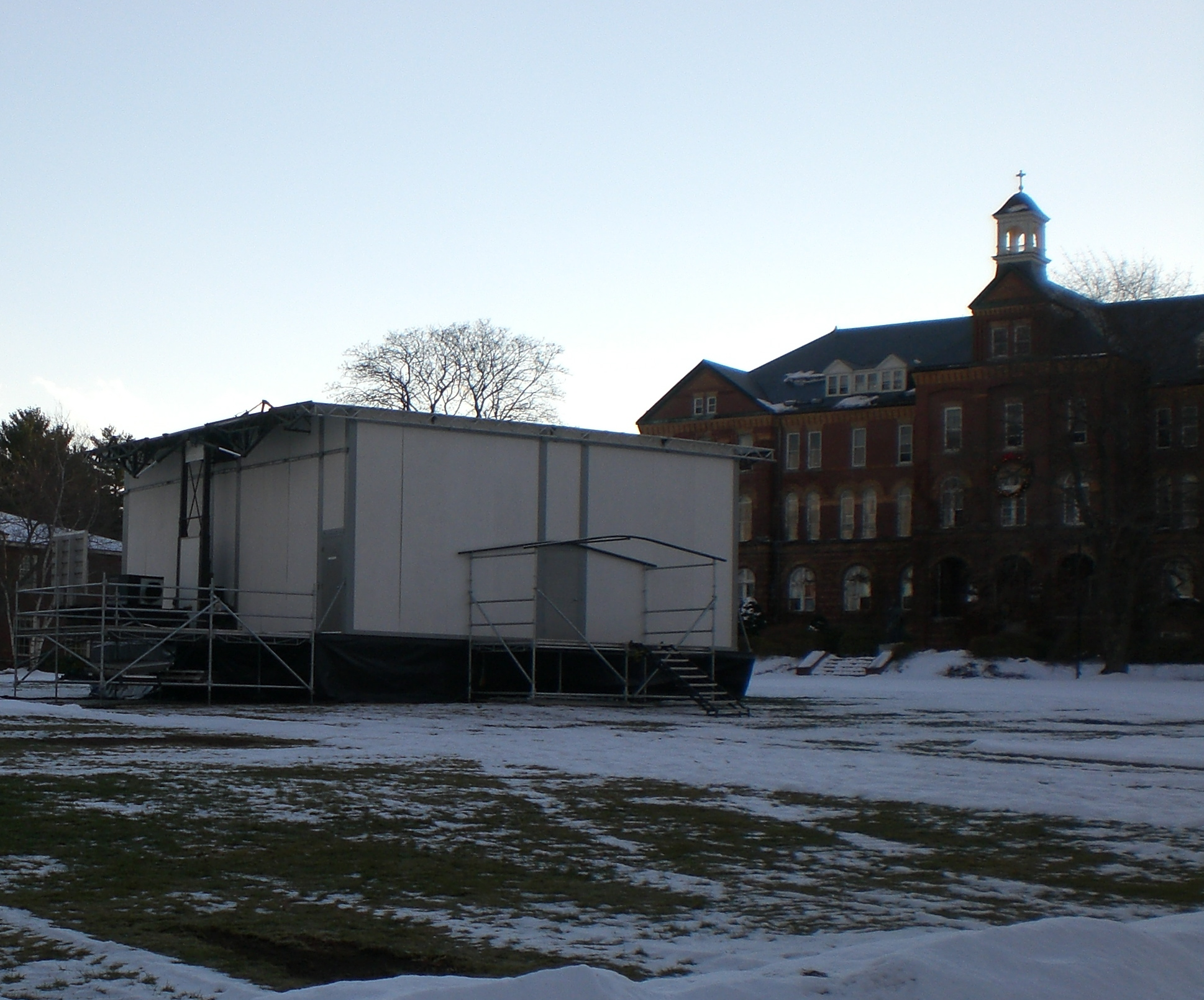
Saint Anselm College Quad with the "Fox-Box", from where the Fox News Channel reported live in both 2004 and 2008.

Many of the modern media personalities have lectured at the institute on topics ranging from their predictions during the 2008 New Hampshire primary to hosting live campaign coverage on the quad, as seen in the adjacent image. Fox News Channel's Brit Hume and Christopher Wallace both reported live from the "Fox-Box" in both 2004 and 2008 as Alumni Hall served as a backdrop for the primary. For the 2012 Fox News New Hampshire Primary coverage, the college showed live shots of Alumni Hall and reported live from Davison Dining Hall. The former anchor of ABC's World News Tonight, Peter Jennings had reported live from the north side of Alumni Hall during nightly broadcasts of his show during the primary. CNN's well known personality Wolf Blitzer was the moderator for the national 2007 debates held in the college's Sullivan Arena., ABC News correspondent and television personality Barbara Walters has visited the college on several occasions, hosting the presidential national debate in 1984. Bob Schieffer, the host of CBS's Face The Nation broadcast live from, "historic Saint Anselm College's Alumni Hall" in June 2007 to interview then candidate John Edwards and his former wife Elizabeth Edwards; in addition to this interview, Mr. Edwards has visited the college on numerous campaign stops talking with students and dropping by classrooms in the institute building.

Journalists who work for many major media outlets stop by the college in the years between the primary when in the area. Time magazine's editor-at-large and political analyst Mark Halperin is one of twenty or so members of the Public Advisory Board set up by the President of the college, Father Jonathan DeFelice Washington Post columnist, and Senior Research Fellow E. J. Dionne lectured in 2007 at the Institute and spoke during an American Government politics class. and Senior editor of The Weekly Standard William Kristol.

The college has been honored with the visit of two Secretaries of State, Madeleine Albright and Hillary Clinton.

In August 2012, Mitt Romney and Paul Ryan held a town hall event for 3,000 plus people on the college quad. The event was covered by all of the national media outlets not only because it was Mitt Romney's 100th town hall event, but it was the first time since announcing that Paul Ryan would be his running mate, that the two appeared in New England. As is often with television "live shots" from the Alumni Hall, the Abbey bells tolled at 11:00, interrupting Paul Ryan during his remarks. This caused Romney to quip, "Only a Catholic guy (Paul Ryan) would be able to get the bells to toll just at the right time at Saint Anselm".
