= Salvo (surname) =

Salvo is an Italian surname which may refer to:

== People ==
- Antonio Salvo (died 1986), Italian businessman
- Camilo Salvo (born 1935), Chilean lawyer and politician
- Ignazio Salvo (died 1992), Italian businessman
- Jodi Salvo, American politician
- Manny Salvo (1913–1997), American baseball player
- María Elvira Salvo (1905–2009), Uruguayan businessperson and philanthropist

== Fictional characters ==
- Juan Salvo, in the Argentine comic El Eternauta

== See also ==
- DeSalvo, a list of people or fictional characters with the surname DeSalvo or De Salvo
- DeSalvo, a list of people with the surname DiSalvo or Di Salvo
- Salvio
- Salvino
