= Saint Anselm College =

Benedictine college in New Hampshire, US

- Motto: Initium Sapientiae Timor Domini (Latin)
- Motto in English: The beginning of wisdom is fear of the Lord (Psalm 111:10)
- Type: Private liberal arts college
- Established: 1889; 137 years ago
- Accreditation: NECHE
- Religious affiliation: Catholic (Order of Saint Benedict)
- Academic affiliations: NHCUC
- Endowment: $231.9 million (2025)
- President: Michael Lewis
- Faculty: 237
- Students: 2,111 (fall 2024)
- Undergraduates: 2,094 (fall 2024)
- Postgraduates: 17 (fall 2024)
- Location: Goffstown, New Hampshire, US; 42°59′6″N 71°30′23″W
- Campus: Suburban, 400 acres (1.6 km^{2})
- Colors: Navy and White
- Nickname: Hawks
- Sporting affiliations: NCAA Division II – Northeast-10 Conference
- Website: anselm.edu

Saint Anselm College is a private Benedictine liberal arts college in Goffstown, New Hampshire, United States. Founded in 1889, it is named after Saint Anselm of Canterbury. In 2024, the college's enrollment was 2,094 students.

== History ==
The first Bishop of Manchester, Denis Mary Bradley, invited the Benedictine monks of St. Mary's Abbey in Newark, New Jersey, to form a college and preparatory school in his diocese. The monks who came to Manchester from St. Mary's were primarily of German descent, as Manchester was heavily populated with French Canadian and Irish immigrant mill workers, and Bradley was unable to find another suitable group that would not stir up ethnic tensions.

The monks, who there founded Saint Anselm Abbey, started the nearby college as New England's third Catholic institution of higher learning. On August 1, 1889, the New Hampshire legislature approved the incorporation of the Order of Saint Benedict of New Hampshire "for religious and charitable purposes, for the education of youth, for establishing churches and conducting services therein." This marked the founding of Saint Anselm College. A six-year curriculum in philosophy and theology was developed.

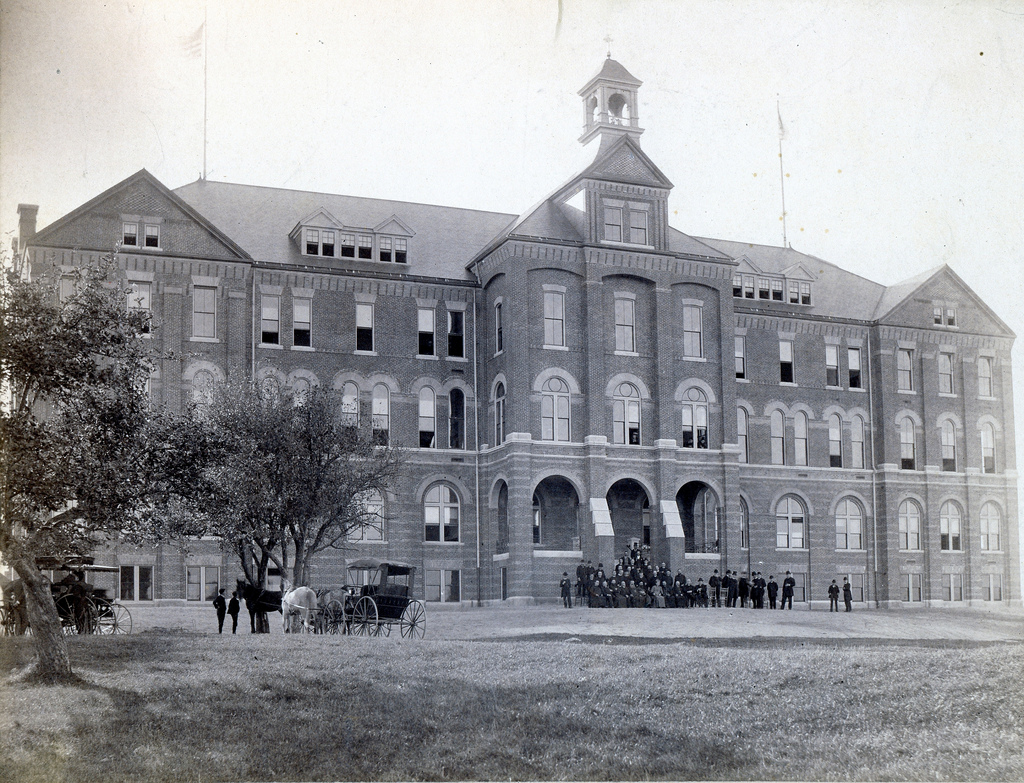
College dedication on October 11, 1893

In 1895, the New Hampshire legislature granted Saint Anselm College the right to bestow standard academic degrees upon its graduates.

The Saint Anselm Abbey's shield was designed by Pierre de Chaignon la Rose of Harvard University. It incorporates the personal coat of Anselm of Canterbury and the first seal of New Hampshire. In 1927, by a monastic vote, the shield design was incorporated as the official shield of Saint Anselm Abbey and the college. The drops in each quadrant represent the three drops of blood on Anselm's coat of arms, and the sheaf of five arrows is taken from the first shield of New Hampshire, representing the state's five original counties. Hence, the Abbey Shield has been interpreted as Saint Anselm of New Hampshire.

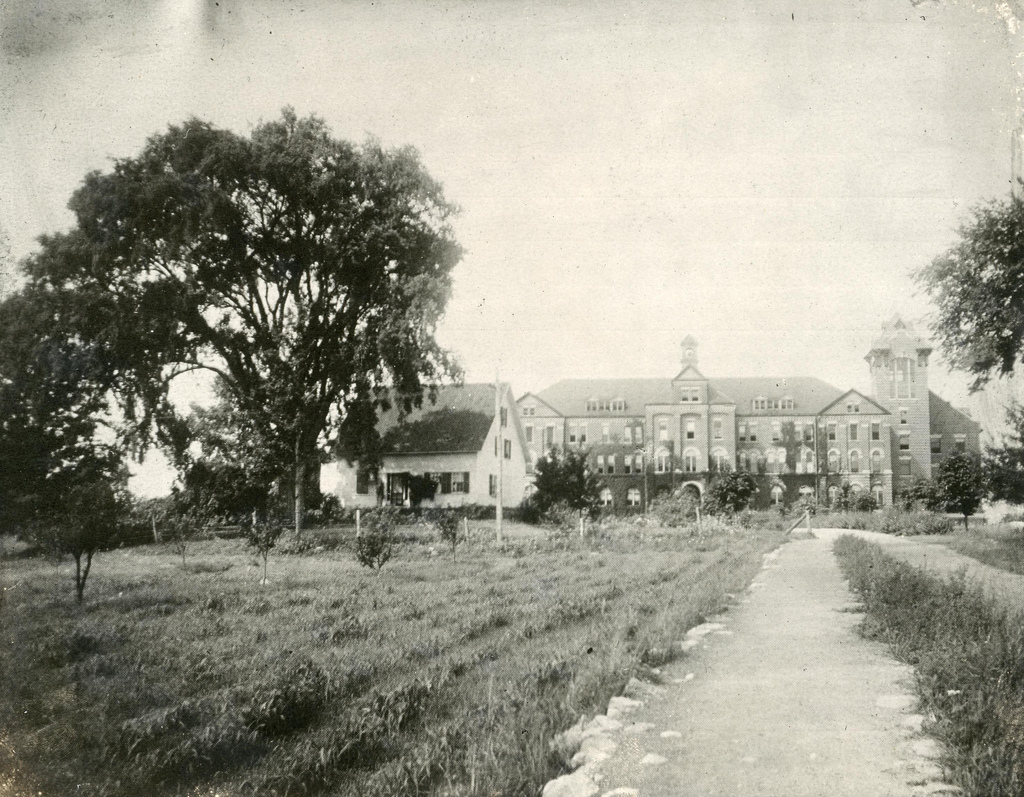
The Eaton House and the Saint Anselm gardens circa 1920

One goal of the early college was to be a self-sufficient institution. The college had a farm of over 100 acres (0.40 km^{2}), complete with chickens, pigs, and cows. It also had a full vegetable garden, which extended from the lawn of Alumni Hall to the current parking lot between Joan of Arc Hall and Davison Hall. Due to the hard work of the monks and several lay members from the local community, the college was agriculturally independent of the local community. Bonaventure Ostendarp founded the Studio of Christian Art in 1893 to sell paintings to Catholic churches throughout the region. The current Raphael House of the Courts dormitories was the original art studio for the monks, built in 1895.

The Benedictines who established Saint Anselm College also founded a preparatory school. It was a prestigious boarding school for elite men from around New England. In 1935, the monks closed the preparatory school to save money for the college's expansion. A notable alumnus of Saint Anselm Preparatory was Connecticut senator Thomas J. Dodd.

In 1942, Saint Anselm College became one of the institutions the War Department selected for training Army Aviation cadets. Thousands of young men were sent there for training and education before entering World War II. Cadets trained on large open fields directly behind the later Coffee Shop. The US government paid the college for training the cadets, and after the war, the college acquired two prefabricated government buildings that have been transformed into the modern-day coffee shop and pub. During the war, several members of the monastic community served as Army chaplains; their names are inscribed on a monument in front of Alumni Hall dedicated to all graduates who have served in the armed forces.

Since the 1950s, the college has played a role in the New Hampshire presidential primary, and has served as a stage for many future presidents, candidates, and supporters.

During the tumultuous 1960s, Saint Anselm College had no major disturbances or riots on campus despite bomb threats called into campus, often from parties outside the college. Placidus Riley, OSB, led the college through these challenging times. Despite the backlash against the US military on college campuses nationwide, the presence of a National Guard armory did not result in any major problems. But in May 1970, final exams were made optional as students showed support for the students of Kent State after the shootings. Students, faculty, and members of the monastic community held prayer services and rallies on campus after the shootings.

The Institute of Saint Anselm Studies was founded in 2000, and the New Hampshire Institute of Politics was founded in 2001.

In 2013, Steven DiSalvo, the former president of Marian University, was named the 10th president of Saint Anselm. DiSalvo replaced Jonathan DeFelice after 24 years of service. DeFelice was the longest-serving college president in New Hampshire. In 2019, Joseph A. Favazza began his tenure as Saint Anselm’s 11th president.

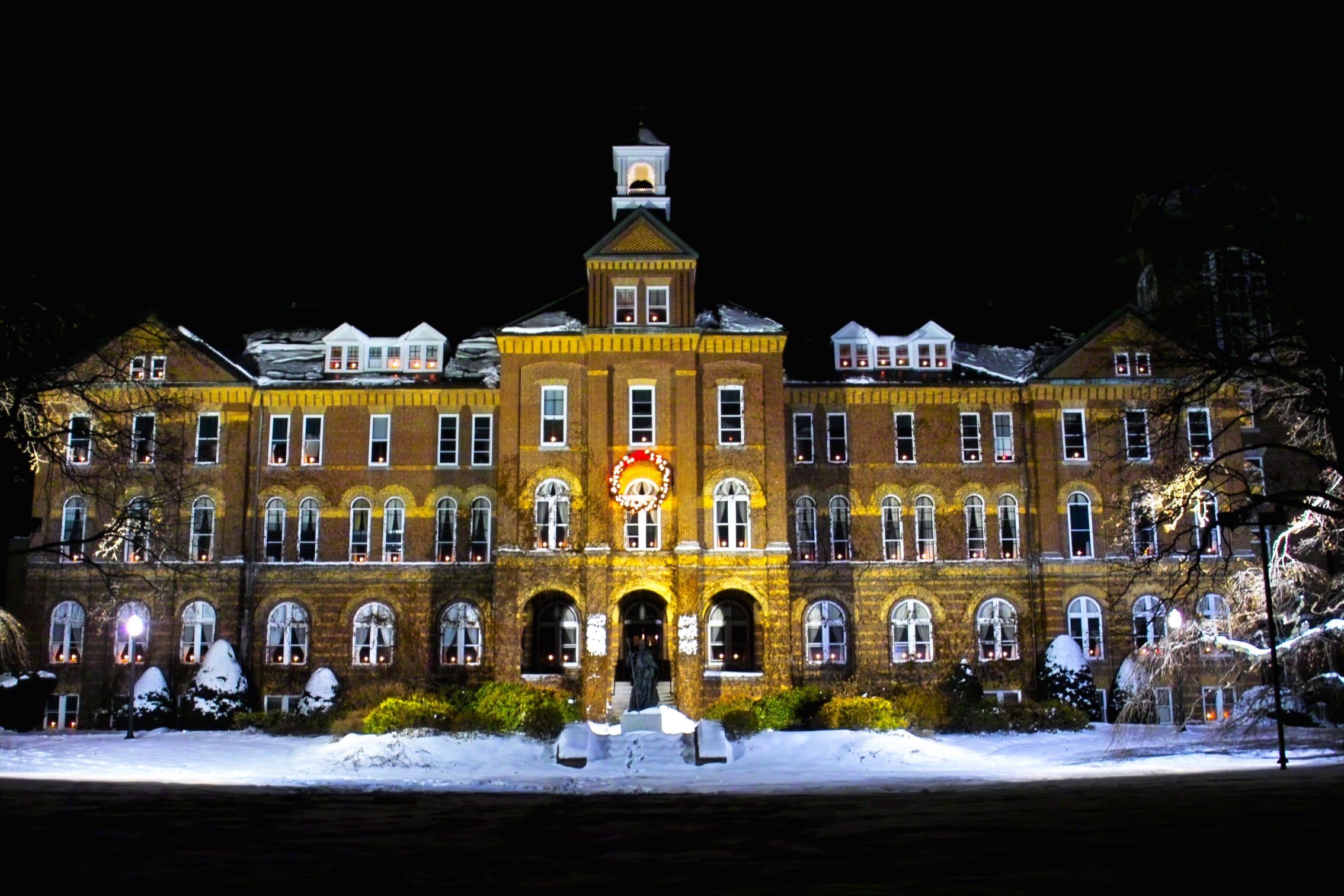
Alumni Hall – present day

The monks of Saint Anselm Abbey had the primary responsibility of the day-to-day operation of the college until 2009, when many of those responsibilities were given to a 20-member board of trustees. A decade later, the monks sued the board over concerns about the college maintaining its Catholic identity. The lawsuit was settled the next year with an agreement that gave the monks responsibility for the college's mission and vision, with the board in charge of routine operations.

== Campus ==
The campus is mostly in Goffstown, New Hampshire, with some of the athletic fields in the adjoining town of Bedford. The mailing address for students and faculty is Manchester, New Hampshire. There are 60 buildings on campus, which spans over 450 acres (1.8 km^{2}). More than 40 of them have been built since 1977.

=== Alumni Hall ===
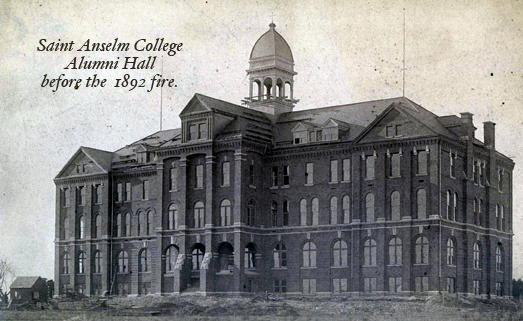
Alumni Hall in 1892, before the fire

Alumni Hall was constructed by the Benedictine monks and local contractors from 1891 through the winter of 1892; the building was designed by Patrick W. Ford, an Irish-American architect from Boston. Nearing completion in February 1892, all that remained was for workers to continue to plaster the interior walls. A fire, which was most likely caused by an open heating stove's grate, sparked an ember and destroyed the entire structure. No one was seriously hurt because of the fire. The monks were forced to rebuild the college, spending considerably less money on the construction, as they had received only $55,000 from the Insurance Commissioner of the State of New Hampshire. In an effort to save money, bricks were salvaged from the previous structure and pieces of granite were cut from large granite rocks still visible on the current quad. In 1893, the building that is the center of campus was completed; the fire delayed the first academic semester by one year. On October 11, 1893, the college was officially rededicated. To avoid the possibility of another fire, a power house was constructed separately from the building. Farmland complete with livestock, beanpoles and tomato plants lined the present-day quad and adjacent fields. In 1912, the bell tower and ivy were added to the building; in 1923, the college's second chapel (the first being located on the second floor at the present-day business office) was constructed as a connecting wing. Today this second chapel is the college's Chapel Arts Center, which hosts art exhibits and other cultural events. It still boasts ornate stained glass windows and painted ceilings.

Today, Alumni Hall houses faculty offices, administrative offices, the Chapel Arts Center, a women's residence hall named "Alumni Streets", and several smart classrooms. Beneath the Chapel Arts Center are a photography lab, darkroom, and several faculty and student publication offices. Beneath "Alumni Streets" and the bell tower are the offices of the Dean of Students, the Registrar's Office, the Office Diversity and Inclusion and several classrooms. Until 1919, the college consisted solely of Alumni Hall. Before this expansion, the monks lived on the second floor and students lived on the third and fourth floors. The first floor and basement had classrooms, a library and cafeteria.

=== Saint Anselm Abbey Church and monastery ===
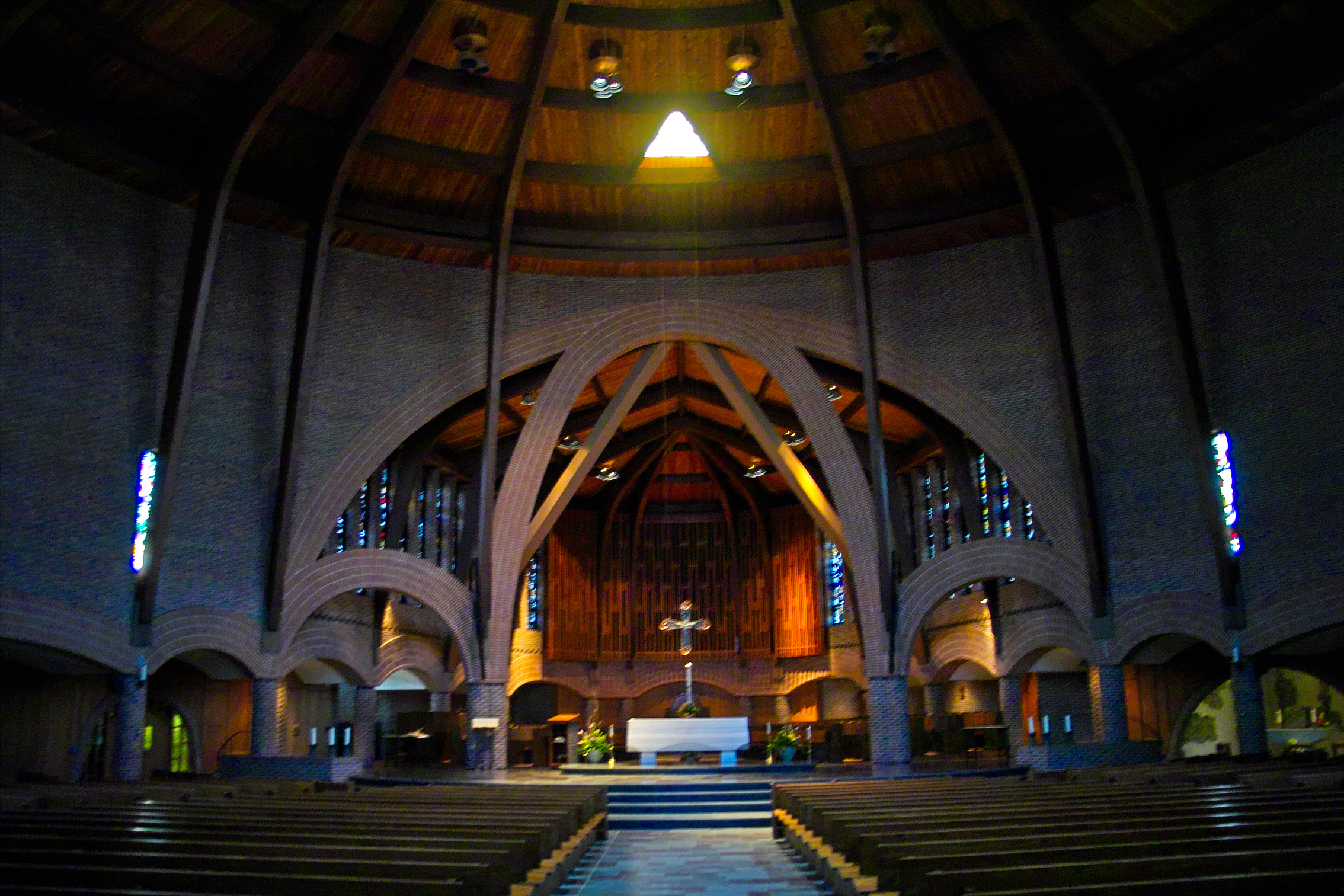
The interior of the Saint Anselm Abbey

The Abbey Church is the liturgical center of the college and is frequently cited as the "heart of campus." The upper church allows the college community to join with the monastic community for the daily celebration of the Eucharist and the Liturgy of the Hours. The lower church permits smaller groups to assemble for worship and houses the Lady Chapel, the Saint Basil Byzantine Chapel, several other side altars, and several meeting rooms. The Lower Church is the location of the weekly 9 p.m. Wednesday night Mass. The monastery, built in 1955, has a kitchen staff and the monks join in all other tasks such as cleaning and upkeep. Having four floors, including a basement, the monastery can house up to eighty people, both monks and male guests on retreat. Elected in 2024, Abbot Isaac Murphy, OSB, has served as the sixth abbot of Saint Anselm Abbey and the ex officio chancellor of the college.

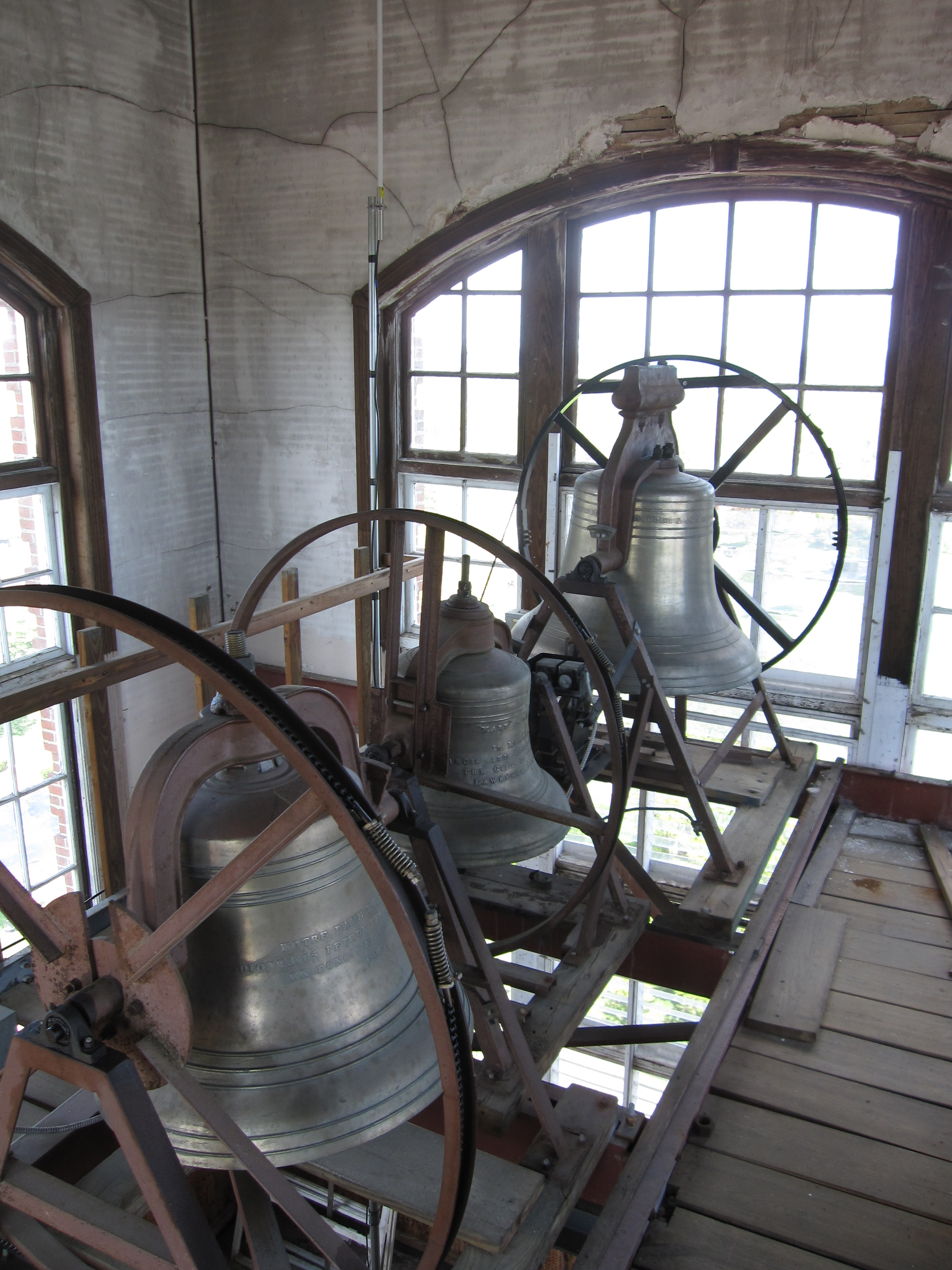
The bell tower of Alumni Hall built in 1912

Male students frequently dine in the monastery as guests, experiencing the monastic practice of silence while eating, which allows for greater contemplation. The monastery has a refectory, a smaller guest refectory, a chapel, two welcoming rooms near the main entrance and elevator access to all four floors. The Abbey also serves as the mother house for the Woodside Priory School and the abbot serves as the spiritual father for the monks who serve there. Saint Anselm Abbey is a member of the American-Cassinese Congregation of the Benedictine Confederation. Saint Anselm Abbey was founded from Saint Mary's Abbey in Newark, New Jersey.

The abbey and church were both designed by Manchester architects Koehler & Isaak, the former in the conservative Colonial Revival style and the latter in an ambitious modernist style. The architects intended the church's exposed masonry and beams to evoke the architecture of the early Catholic church.

=== Geisel Library ===
The college performed a self-study in 1950 that revealed the need for a larger library. Joseph Geisel, a prominent Manchester businessman, contributed $500,000 in stock, and in 1959 the college broke ground on Geisel Library; the library opened its doors in the fall of 1960. Like the abbey, the library was designed by Koehler & Isaak. The 20,000-square-foot (1,900 m^{2}) library featured reading rooms, study areas, a reference center, a music room, seating for 385 students, and space for 100,000 volumes. This original section is the core of the present building. Two expansions, one in 1973 and the final in 1992, each increased the library's area by 20,000 square feet (1,900 m^{2}).

Geisel Library has three floors and over 60,000 square feet (5,600 m^{2}) of space housing over 200,000 books, as well as resources and electronic equipment. The library is complete with several reference desks, over 30 computers, the Institute of Saint Anselm Studies and the Computer Science Department. On the second floor, there are three enclosed study areas; two are group study rooms that are available for student use, and the third is named the Creaghe Room, a locked, faculty-only study.

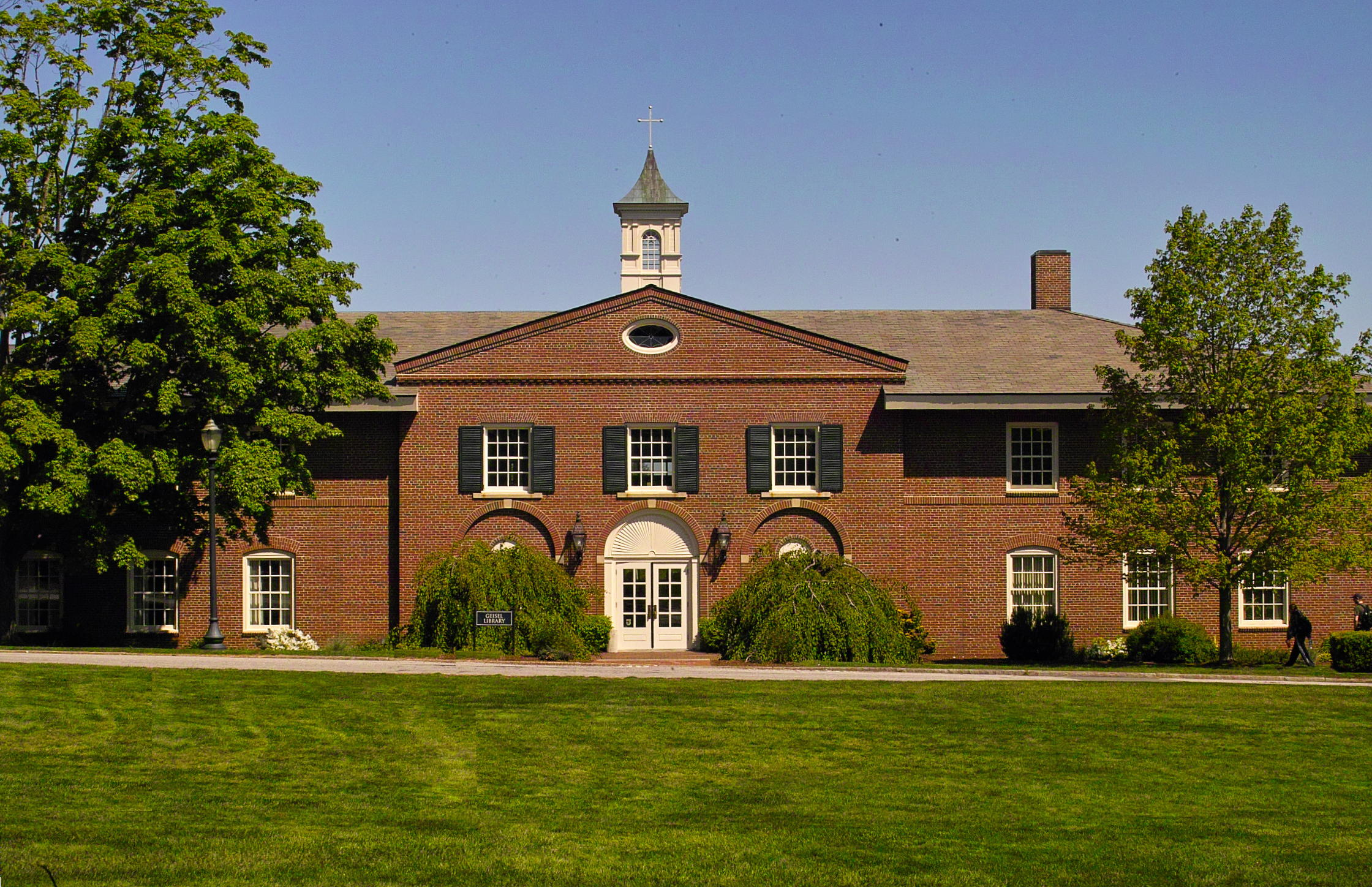
The exterior of Geisel Library was re-modeled in 1992.

Geisel Library's book collection began with a sack of books brought by Fr. Hugo Paff from Saint Mary's Abbey in Newark, New Jersey; these books are still in the library and date back to the mid-19th century. During the early years of the college, Benedictines served as librarians on an ad hoc basis, but by 1929, Saint Anselm had its first official librarian, Fr. Cuthbert Redmond. New books were purchased under Fr. Edwin Davitt. By 1937, Saint Anselm could boast 8,000 books in several mini-libraries, as well as the main repository, by this time located on the second floor.

=== Performing arts – Dana Center ===
The Dana Center for the Humanities is the premier performing arts center on the campus of Saint Anselm College. The center was home to the nationally recognized humanities program, "Portraits of Human Greatness", and is also the headquarters for the student theater group, the Anselmian Abbey Players. The Anselmian Abbey Players have been a center of theater, culture, and music on campus for over 75 years. This tradition began in the fall of 1949 with a production of "Career Angel". The Dana Center hosts many touring companies throughout the year. These performances include classical theater, contemporary dance, concerts, and films. These performances attract visitors from throughout the region. On stage, international and domestic performers stage both traditional and modern programs ranging from contemporary Indian dance to Piedmont blues to Russian classical music.

The United States Presidential debates have been held either in the Dana Center or in the Sullivan Arena since 2000.

=== Residence halls ===
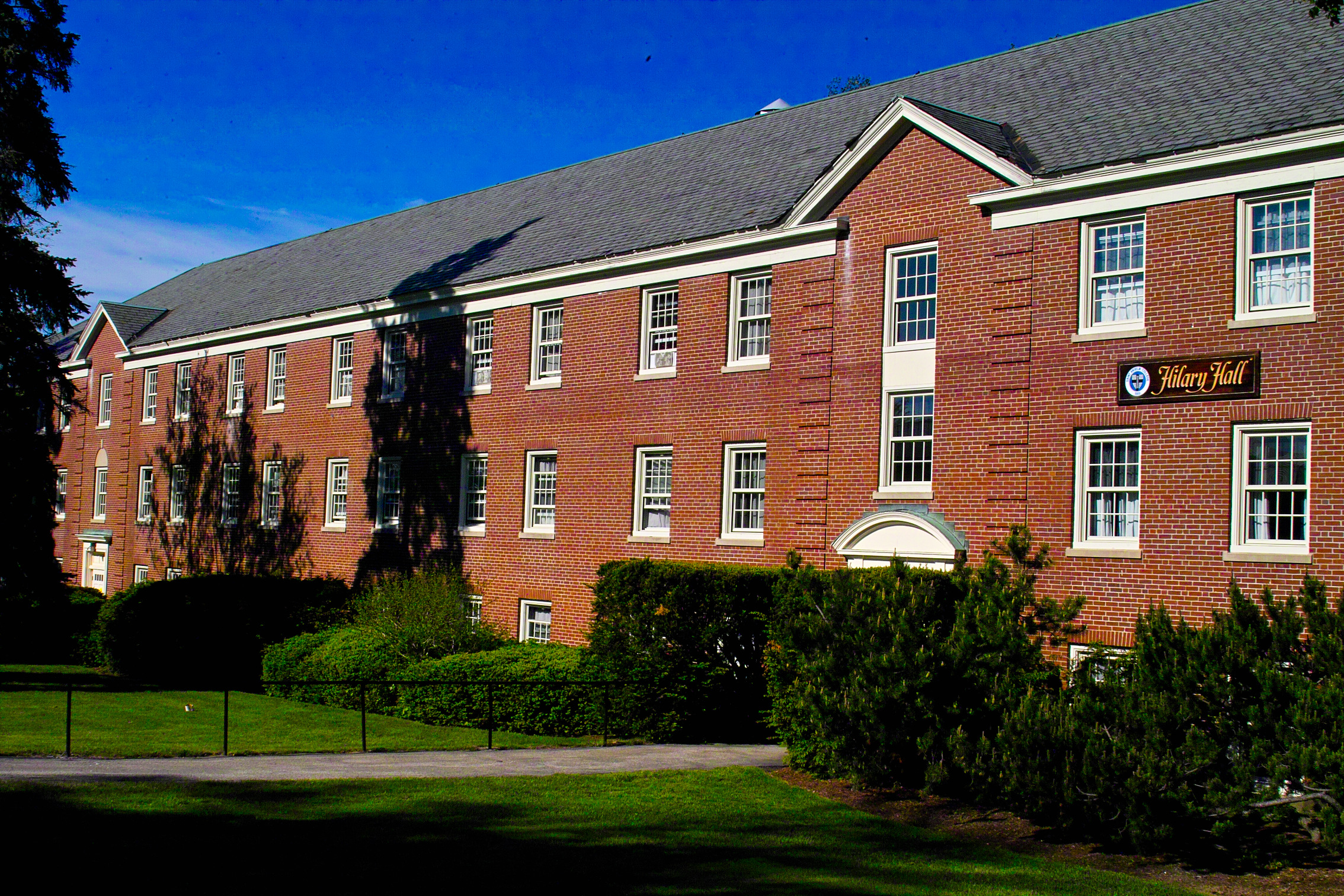
Hilary Hall is named after Abbot Hilary Pfrängle.

34 buildings on campus are devoted to student housing, with approximately 95 percent of the student body living on campus. The majority of freshman males live in Dominic Hall, while most freshman females reside in either Joan of Arc Hall (commonly referred to as JOA) or Baroody Hall. Juniors and seniors often live in 4 or 5 person apartment or townhouse style housing on campus.

=== Joseph Hall ===
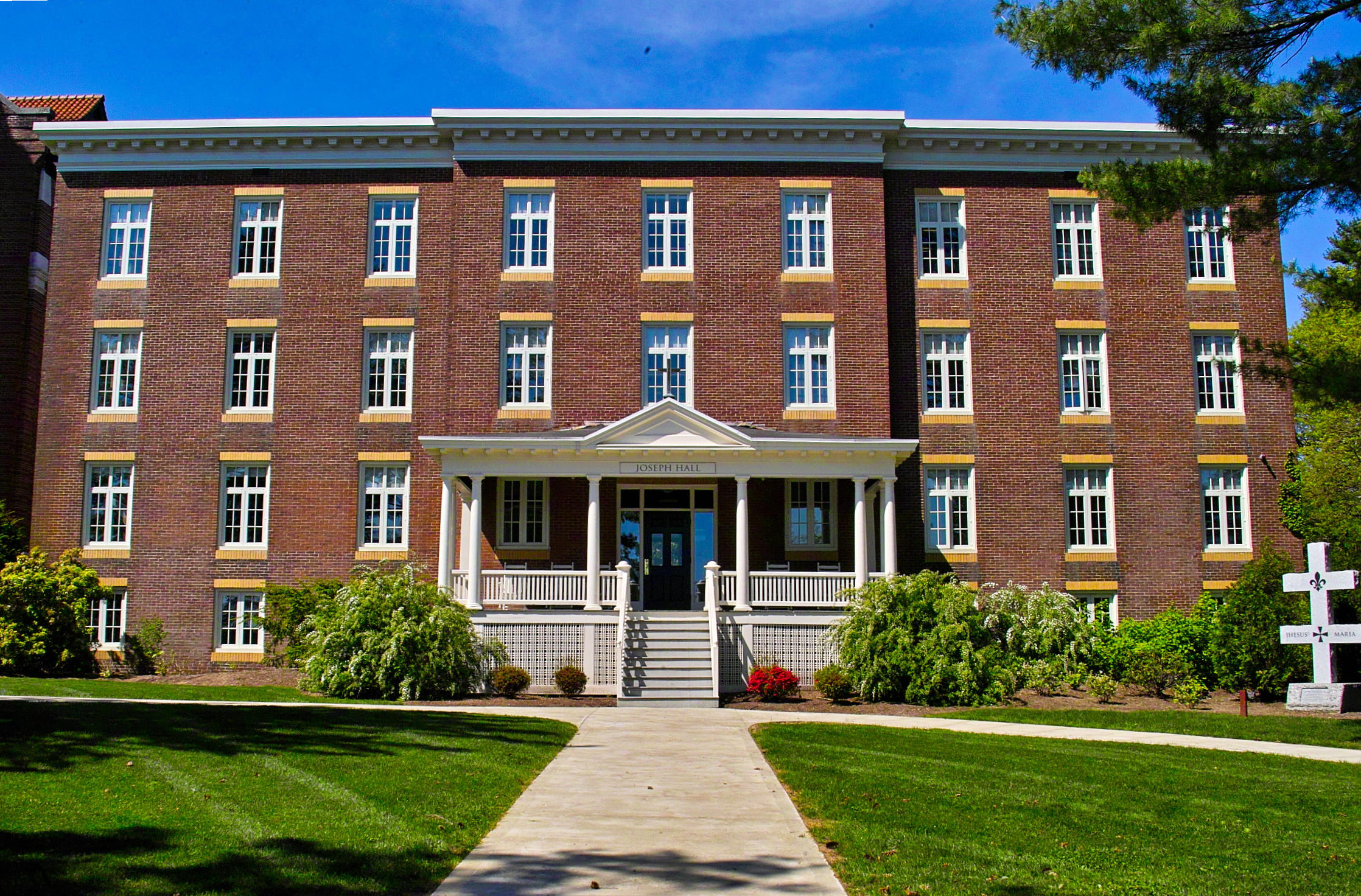
Joseph Hall

The campus underwent a substantial facelift in 2009, as new faculty offices and instructional spaces were created within the newly renovated Saint Joan of Arc Convent, which is known as Joseph Hall. Joseph Hall is named after the third Abbot of Saint Anselm Abbey and former Bishop of Portland, Maine, Bishop Joseph John Gerry. In the summer of 2025, Joseph Hall is undergoing another renovation to become a student residence hall.

Constructed in 1919, Joseph Hall served as the first monastery outside of Alumni Hall between 1919 and 1955. In 1955, when the abbey was built, the Sisters of Saint Joan of Arc, from Quebec, Canada, moved in from Bradley House (across campus), and the building was renamed the "Saint Joan of Arc Convent." Their departure in 2008 ended over 50 years of service to the college, as the sisters were cooks, seamstresses and performed other domestic services for the monastic community.

=== Athletic facilities ===
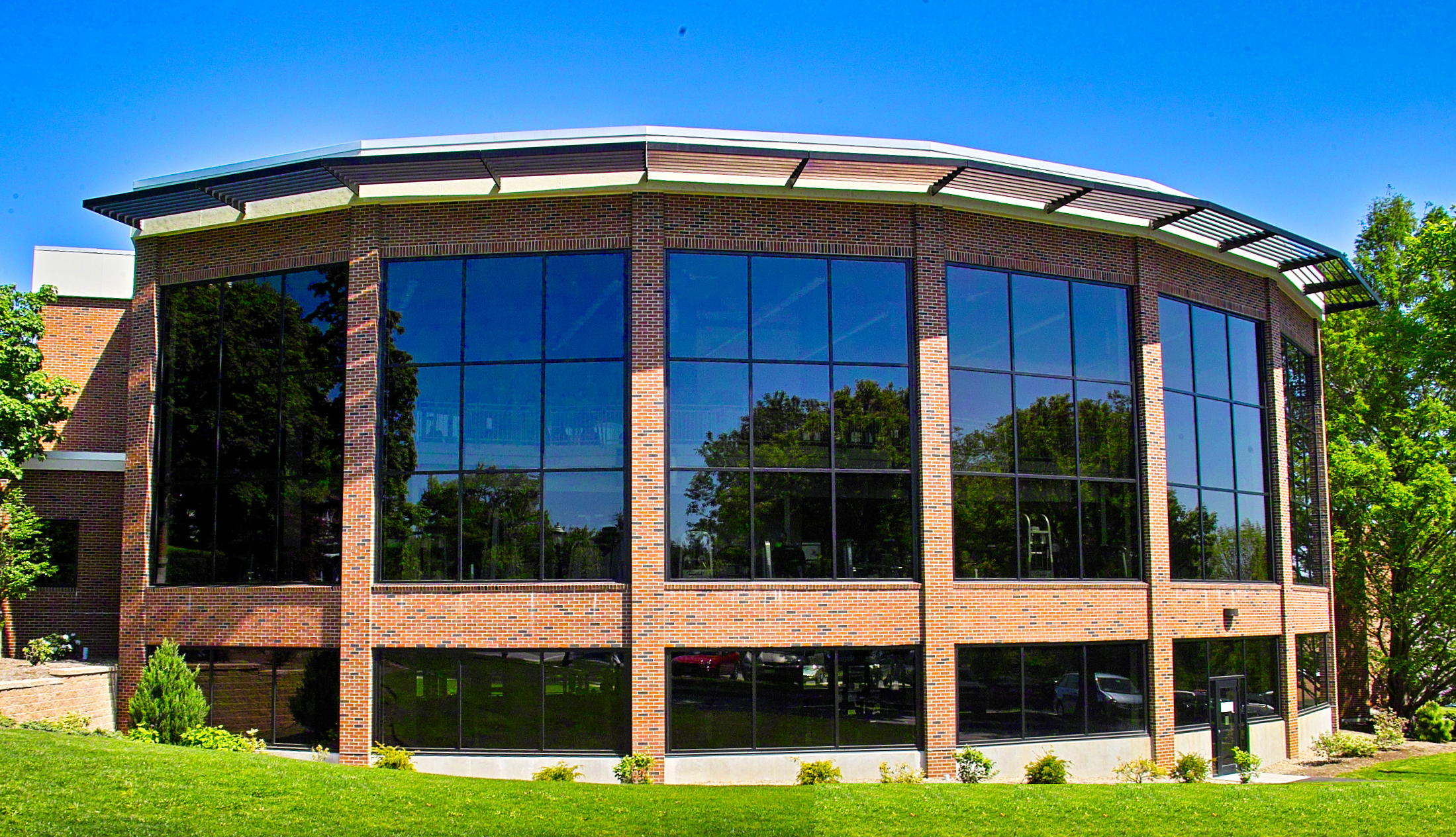
Remodeled Carr Center

The college opened a $2-million, 9,000-square-foot (840 m^{2}) fitness center in February 2009. The addition to the Carr Center is a three-story glass fitness space, with floor to ceiling windows overlooking the baseball and football fields, constructed on the south side of the building. The additions brought 37 cardiovascular machines, 39 strength pieces and 7,000 pounds of weights. Connecting to the addition are three indoor basketball/tennis courts equipped with scoreboards and a sound system. The basement of Carr Center has the varsity gym, football locker room, general locker rooms and administrative offices for the athletic department. In 2012, the college spent $1.3 million by installing a synthetic turf field at Grappone Stadium, and added lights for nighttime practice and games.

=== Quad and dormitory ===
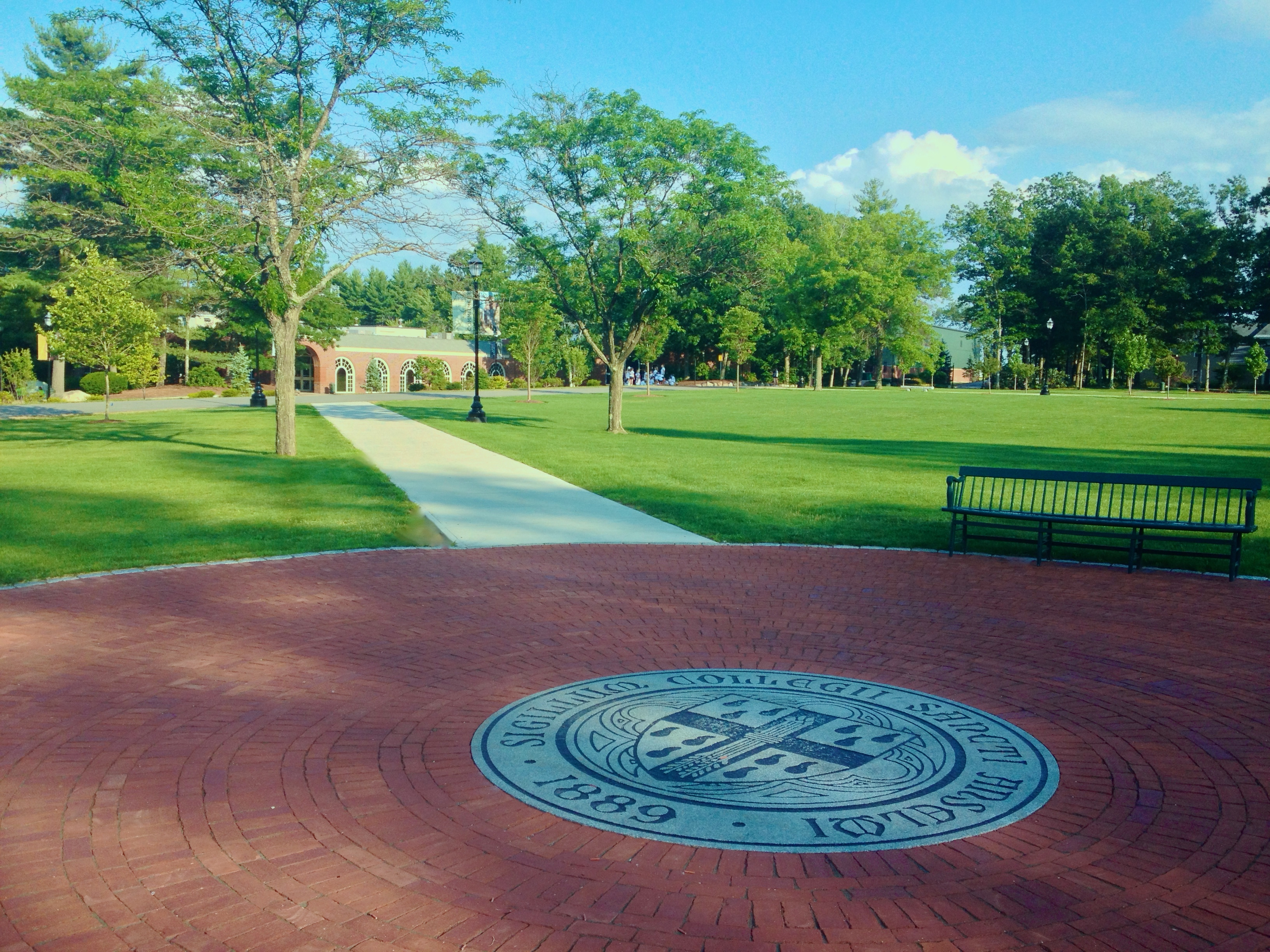
The renovated JOA quad, facing the nationally ranked Davison Dining Hall

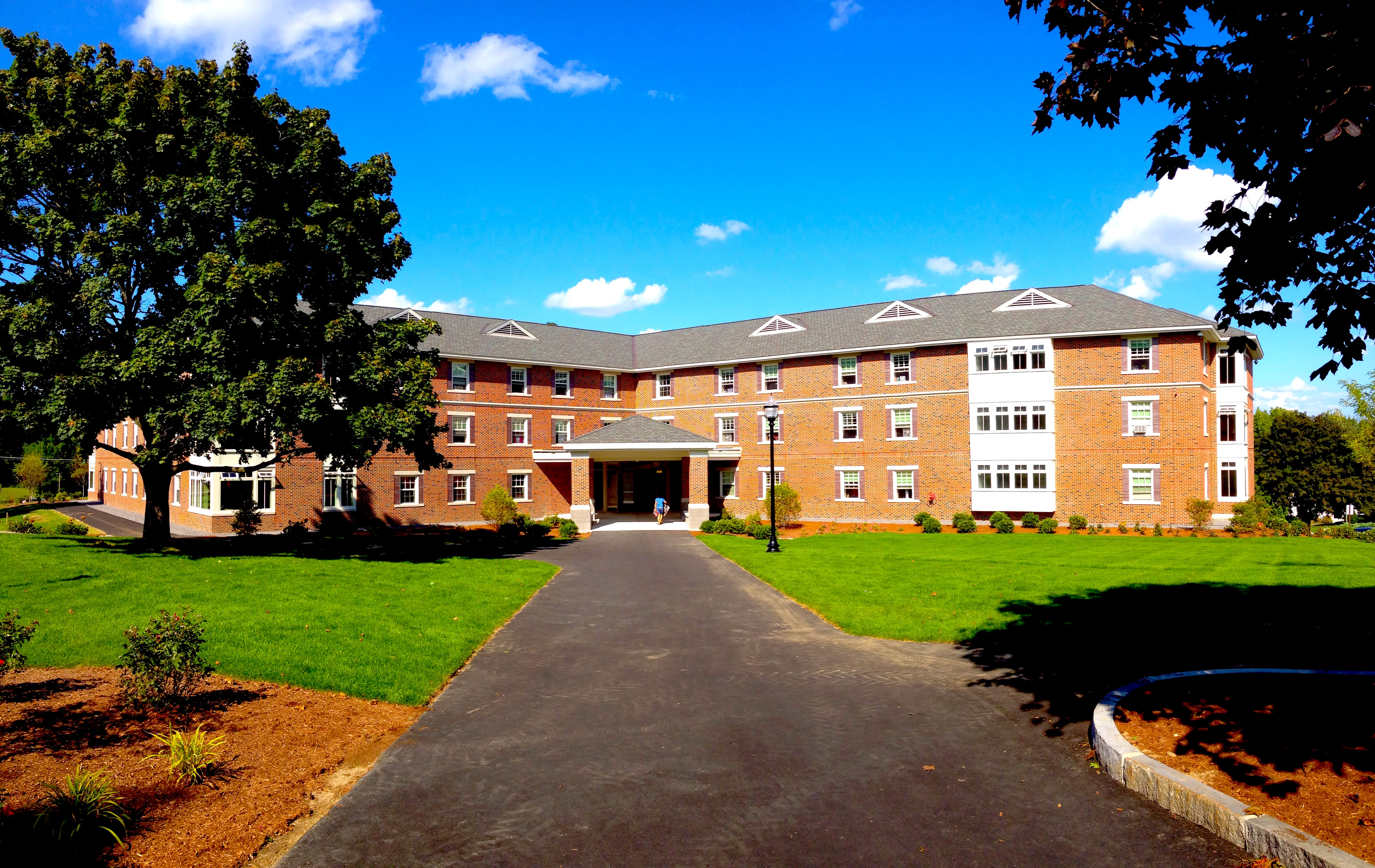
The Living Learning Commons, the newest residence hall on campus

Construction began on the newest dormitory in the summer of 2013. The project cost over $9.5 million and is situated near the lower entrance of campus behind Brady Hall. The residence hall, known as the "Living Learning Commons" (LLC), is able to hold 150 students, and has expanded the residential options for undergraduates. The residence hall's common spaces are air-conditioned, while the individual rooms are not. LLC also features student-friendly amenities such as a recycling room, bike storage, general storage space for students, and an elevator. Additionally, over 3,000 square feet (280 m^{2}) is dedicated to common space, including modern kitchenettes, classroom space, and individual study areas on each floor.

In 2012, a new parking lot was constructed on college-owned land between Sullivan Arena and privately owned Clarke Farm, located in Bedford. The former Joan of Arc parking lot was renovated, and the space is occupied by a grassy quadrangle. A grotto was also built between JOA and Gadbois Hall and was dedicated in late 2014, with the placement of a statue of the Virgin Mary. The quadrangle, referred to as the "JOA Quad" or the "Campus Green", has lights and walkways and is lined with trees; the centerpiece is a brick patio with a large, granite seal of the college.

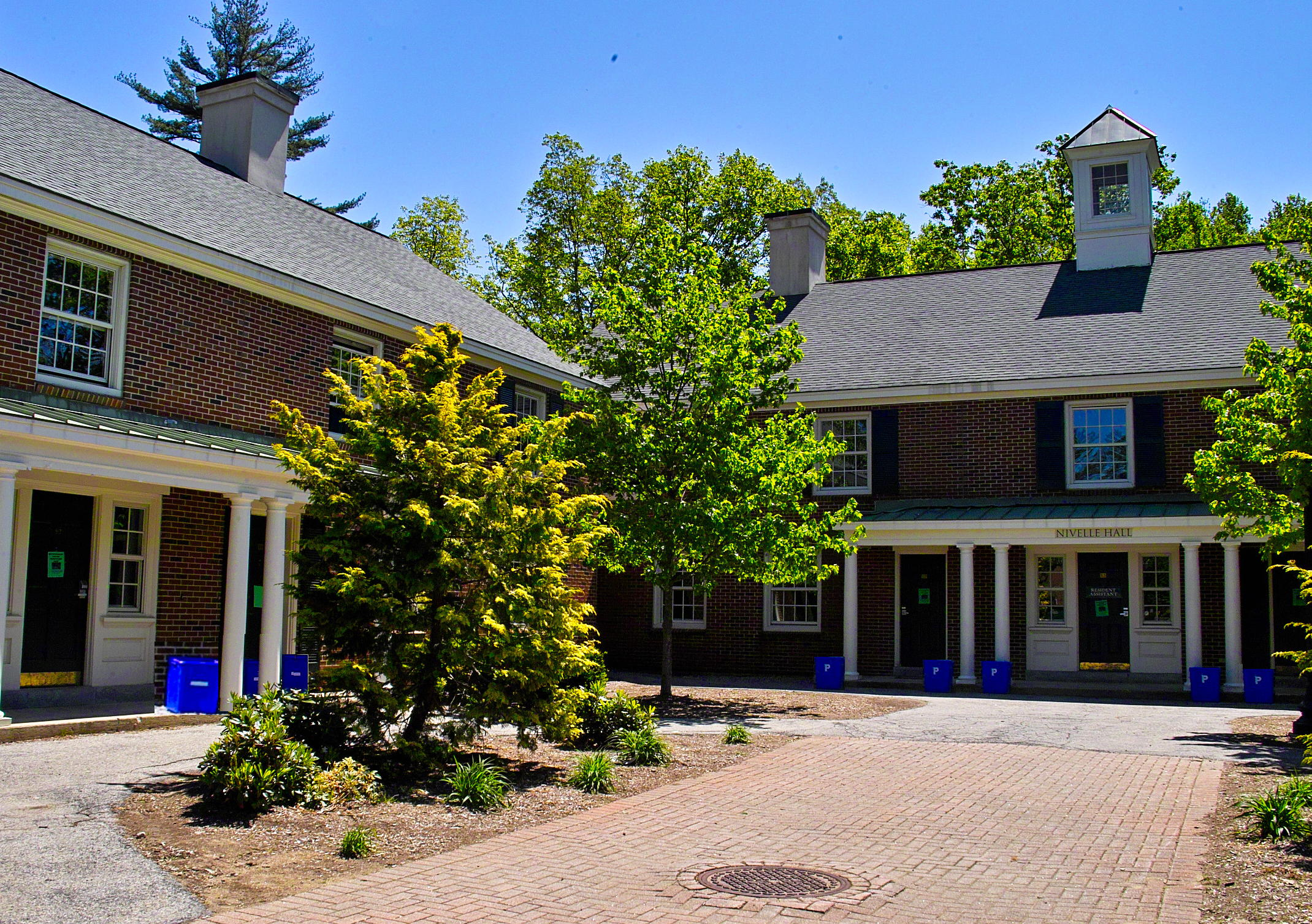
Fr. Bernard Court, affectionately called the "Uppers", is a series of apartments and townhouses in which upperclassmen, typically seniors, live.

== Academics ==
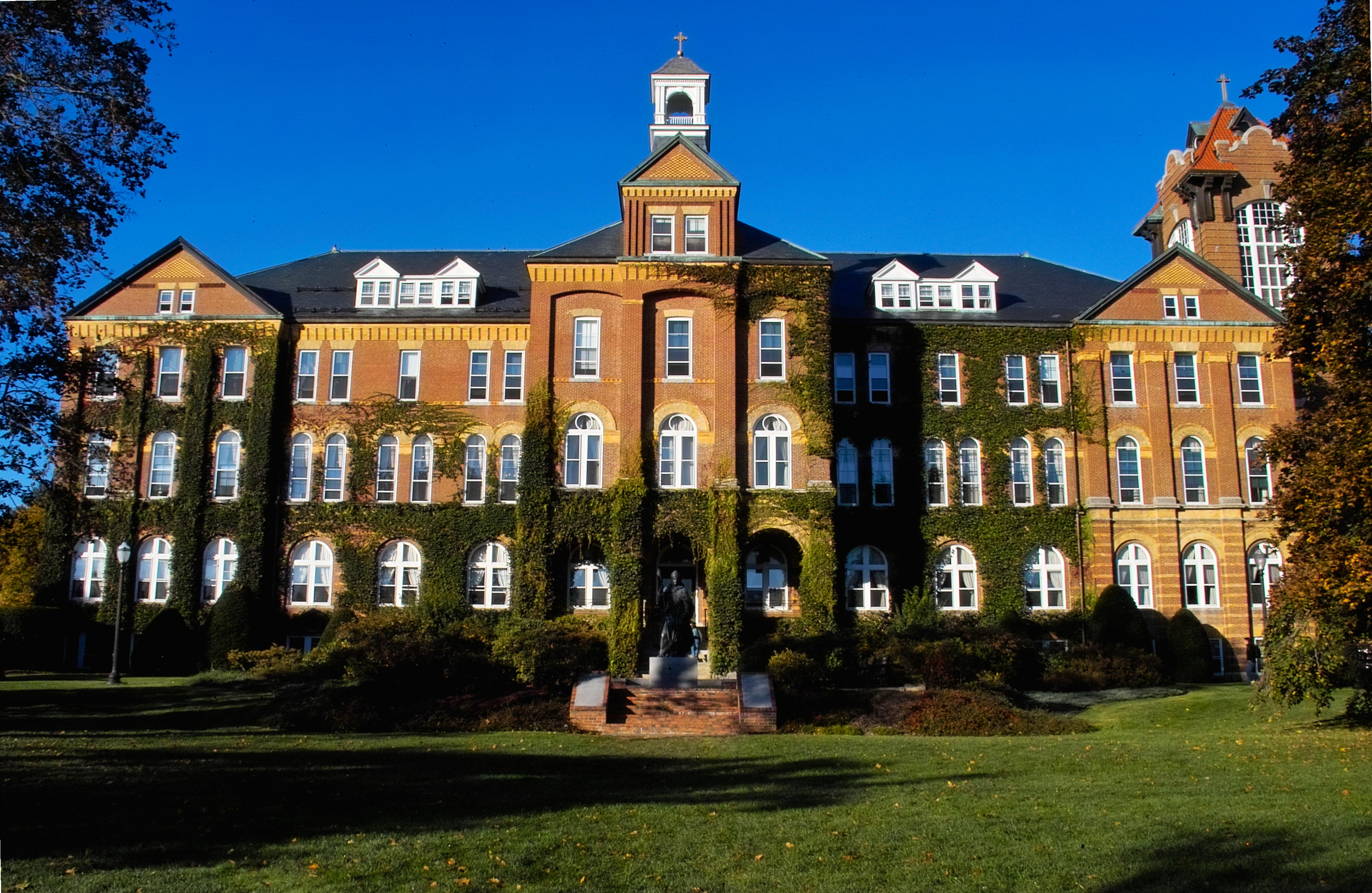
Alumni Hall was built in 1891, and is well known as the center of campus

The college offers a one-year "Conversatio" lecture series with a focus on the pursuit of the "good life". Conversatio challenges students to examine questions of value, moral choice, and the significance of human life.

=== Academic programs ===
Saint Anselm College offers 69 majors in 32 different subject areas.

=== Graduate programs ===
Since 2022, Saint Anselm has offered graduate degrees. Currently, the four different areas for study are a Master's in Special Education (M.Ed.), a Master's of Public Policy (M.P.P.), a Master of Arts (M.A.) in Criminal Justice, and beginning in the fall of 2025, both an online Master of Science in Nursing (M.S.N.) and a Post-Master's Certificate (P.M.C.) in Nursing Leadership and Innovation. The M.Ed., M.A., M.S.N., and P.M.C. programs are available to all applicants but the M.P.P. degree is currently only available to those who graduate from Saint Anselm's undergraduate program. The College anticipates the MPP program will begin accepting all qualified part-time students in 2026.

=== Anti-grade inflation policy ===
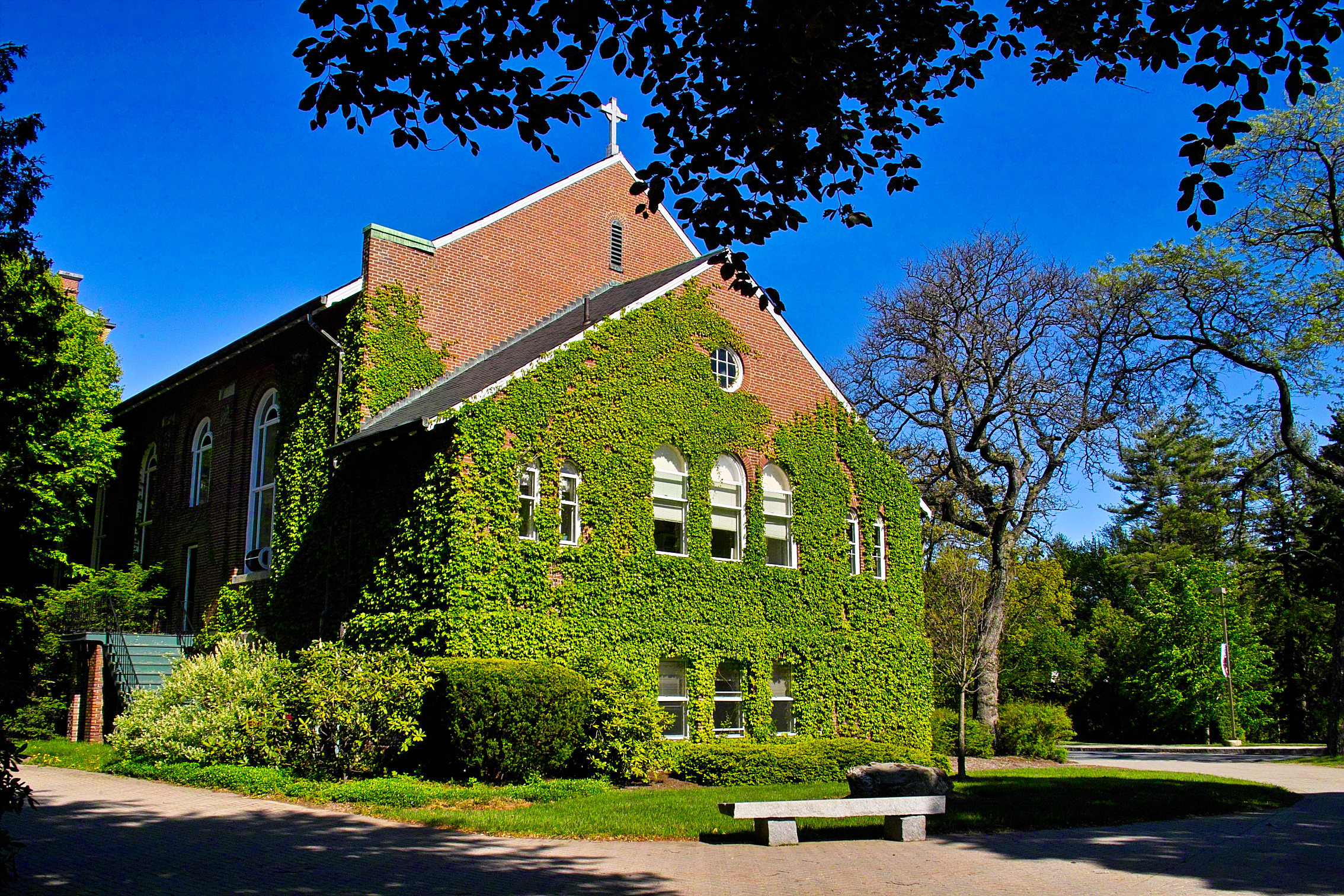
The Chapel Arts Center on the "hilltop" section of campus

While Saint Anselm College once had a reputation for the practice of grade-deflation, this is no longer the case. Because of this, and the pursuant increase in grade point averages among the student body, the requirements for Latin honors have been raised. According to the college's 2024-2025 Student Handbook, students must achieve a 3.4 GPA to graduate cum laude, a 3.6 to graduate magna cum laude, and a 3.85 graduate summa cum laude. The Dean's List of Scholars is an internal honor society accepting students that fulfill its requirements of a 3.4 semester GPA in at least four classes. The top 25 percent of the school generally qualifies for the list. Members receive a card of congratulations, signed by the dean of the college.

=== Admissions ===
The majority of the applicant pool is from the New England area though there is an increasing number from outside of this zone. In recent years, Saint Anselm College has accepted about 77% of all applicants. The selection process is composed of a comprehensive review of the applicant's high school transcript, personal recommendations from teachers and guidance counselor, an essay, and extracurricular involvement. Since 2020, submission of SAT or ACT scores are optional for applicants. The college typically receives more than 4,000 applicants per year, and the retention rate of Saint Anselm students from freshman to sophomore year is 88 percent. In 2024, those admitted had an average 3.39 GPA, and those submitting test scores had an average 1120-1290 SAT score for the 20% submitting or average 26-30 ACT score for the 2% submitting.

=== Rankings ===
Academic rankings

Liberal arts
- U.S. News & World Report: 72 (tie) of 206
- Washington Monthly: 123

National
- Forbes: 319
- WSJ/College Pulse: 256

In 2026, U.S. News and World Report ranked Saint Anselm tied for No. 72 out of 206 schools in "National Liberal Arts Colleges", tied for No. 68 out of 164 schools in "Top Private Schools", and No. 80 in "Best Value Schools". In 2024, MONEY Magazine named Saint Anselm College one of the "Best Colleges for Your Money," with the college receiving 4.5 out of 5 stars.

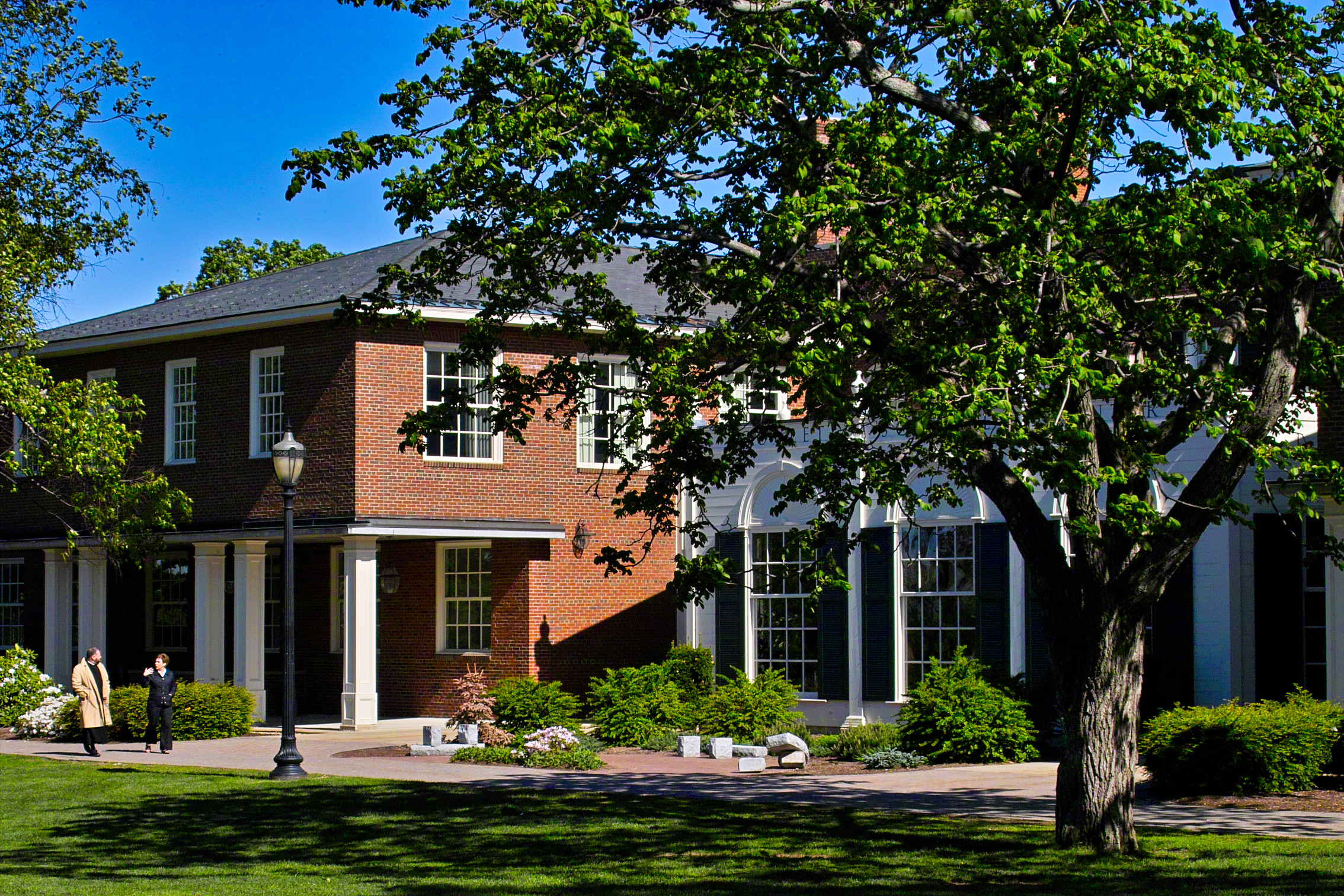
Goulet Science Center

=== Honor societies ===
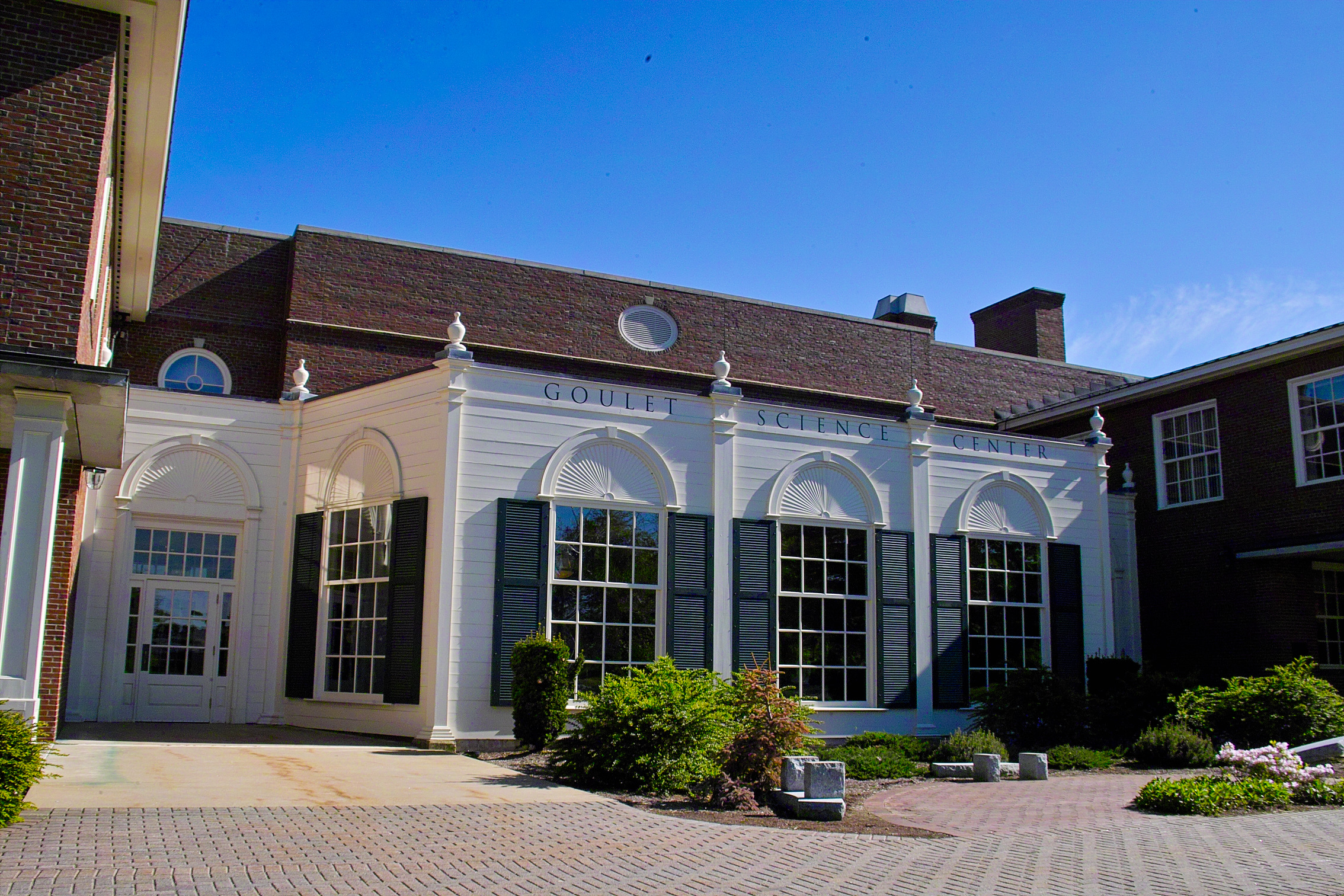
Goulet Science Center is where much of the college's research is performed.

Saint Anselm College participates in the following national and international honor societies. Invitations from these societies are organized through each academic department, as students are usually invited membership by junior or senior year.

Delta Epsilon Sigma, the Catholic equivalent to Phi Beta Kappa, is the oldest honor society at the college. Open to all majors, the Tau Chapter, founded in 1940, accepts only 40 members from the senior and junior classes.

Other societies include the international social science honor society Pi Gamma Mu, history honor society Phi Alpha Theta, economics honor society Omicron Delta Epsilon, nursing honor society Sigma Theta Tau, Spanish language honor society Sigma Delta Pi, French honor society Pi Delta Phi, psychology honor society Psi Chi, politics honor society Pi Sigma Alpha, biology honor society Beta Beta Beta, and physics honor society Sigma Pi Sigma.

=== Accreditation and memberships ===
Saint Anselm College is accredited by the New England Commission of Higher Education. Saint Anselm is a member of the Association of Benedictine Colleges and Universities, as Father Jonathan DeFelice was a co-founder of this organization in 1993. The baccalaureate program in nursing is accredited by the Commission on Collegiate Nursing Education and approved by the New Hampshire Board of Nursing. The Continuing Nursing Education program is accredited as a provider of continuing nursing education by the American Nurses Credentialing Center's Commission on Accreditation.

== New Hampshire Institute of Politics ==
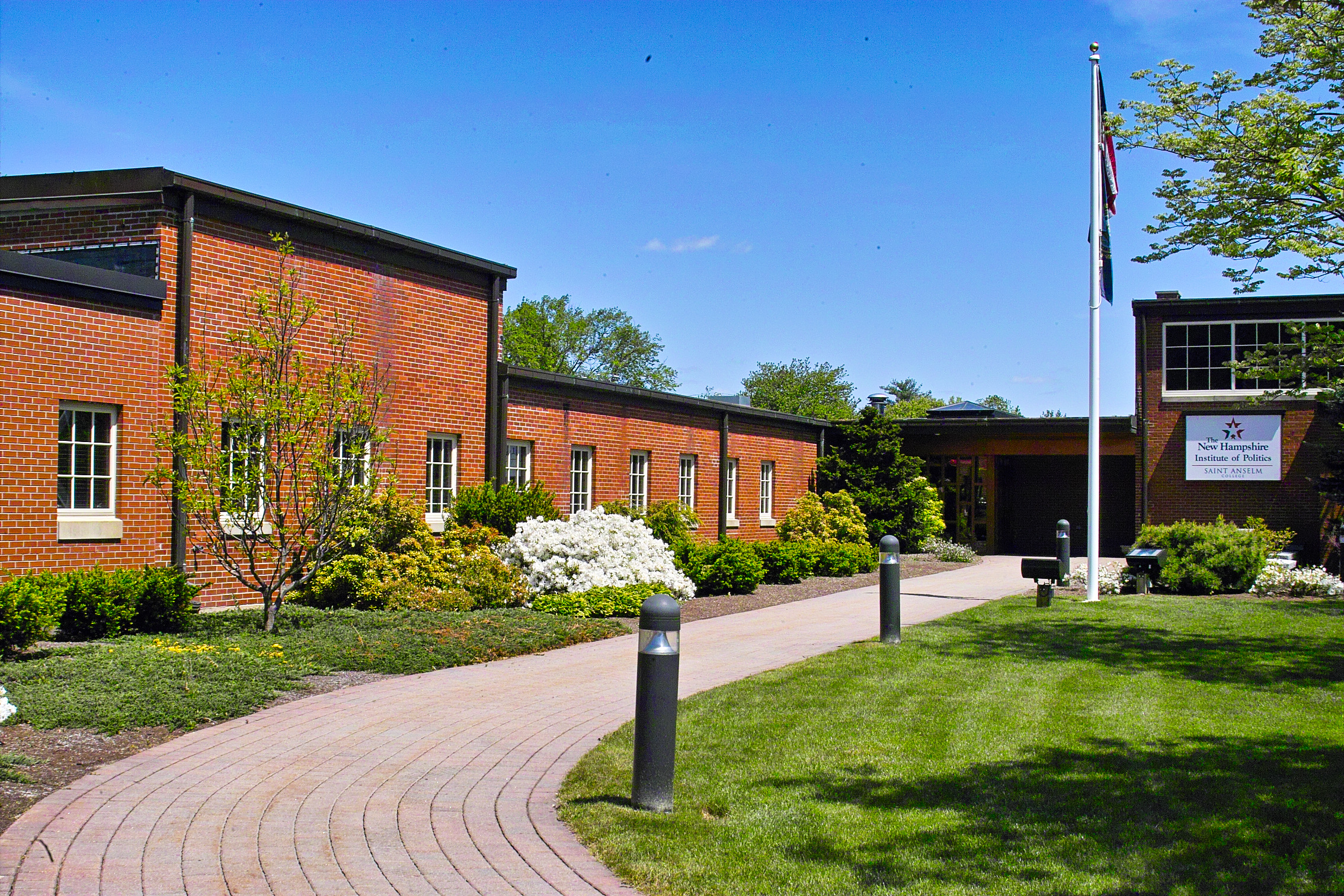
The west entrance of the NHIOP

Marc Ambinder, political editor of The Atlantic, described the role Saint Anselm plays in national politics by saying, "no one runs for president without speaking at St. A's New Hampshire Institute of Politics." U.S. News & World Report also ranked the college as the single, most popular location in New Hampshire for presidential candidates to visit. For over the past forty years, the New Hampshire Institute of Politics (NHIOP) has played host to hundreds of presidential aspirants who have delivered policy speeches at Saint Anselm College. It was founded on the basis that "educated and engaged citizens are vital for a healthy democracy." The NHIOP houses the Politics department, as well as providing classroom space for use by all departments. The institute is credited with raising the national profile of the college by incorporating the college in the New Hampshire primary, the first primary of the United States presidential election.

== Meelia Center for Community Engagement ==
The Meelia Center is one of the many outlets available for students to volunteer in the Greater Manchester community. Since 1989, the Meelia Center has allowed Saint Anselm College students to mobilize their talents and energies to assist 14 community partnerships and more than 30 other community service agencies throughout New Hampshire. Annually, some 850 students, faculty, and staff volunteer more than 16,000 community service hours. The Princeton Review has described the Meelia Center as "the nerve center of Saint Anselm's bustling service community", adding that "the center, according to the school, 'employs nearly sixty student service leaders, who in turn recruit, place, and support over 200 volunteers and 210 service learners each semester who perform weekly service in over thirty community agencies. An additional 350 volunteers serve in occasional one-day service events. In 2010, the Meelia Center alone accounted for the coordination of 20,000 service hours by Saint Anselm students.'" New students are introduced to the service commitment through the New Student Day of Service. As part of freshman orientation, students are sent in teams of thirty to partnership sites and other community non-profit agencies. Upperclassmen work throughout the summer to organize these orientation events that involve anywhere from fifteen to twenty sites around New Hampshire.

== Athletics ==
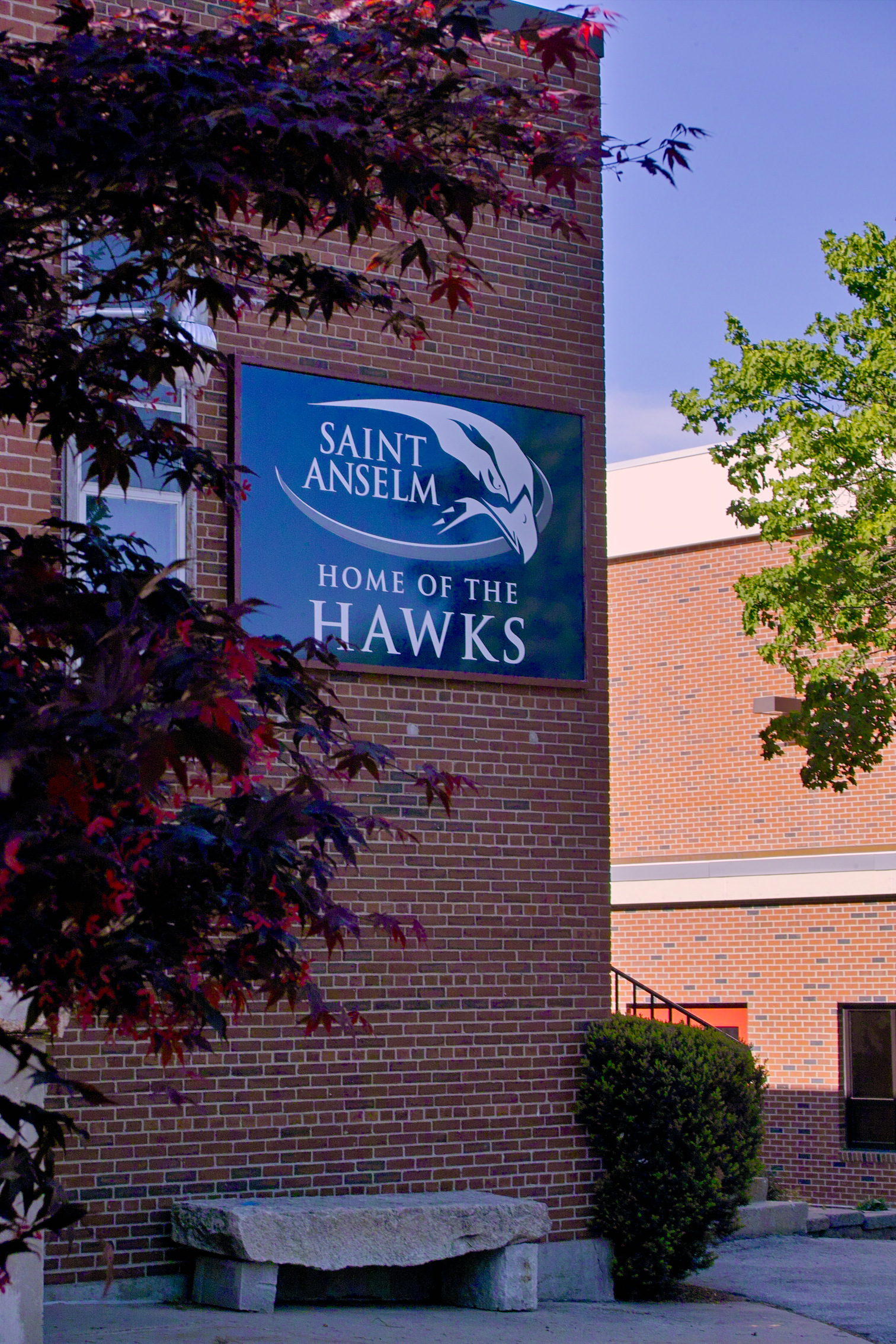
East entrance of Stoutenburg Gymnasium

Saint Anselm College competes at the NCAA Division II level in 23 men's and women's varsity sports. The college offers baseball, basketball, cross country, football, golf, ice hockey, lacrosse, skiing, soccer, tennis, field hockey, volleyball, track & field, bowling and softball programs open to all students. Saint Anselm's sports teams are known as the Hawks; their colors are blue and white. The Hawks participate as a member of the Northeast 10 in most sports. In women's ice hockey and women’s bowling, the Hawks compete as de facto NCAA Division I programs in the New England Women's Hockey Alliance and the East Coast Conference, respectively.

On October 24, 2024, the Saint Anselm College Women's Field Hockey team won the NCAA Division II National Championship. The overtime goal against Kutztown University was scored by fifth year senior Maddie Davis '25. This was the first national championship the college has won although the women's softball team and men's and women's basketball teams have had very successful playoff runs in recent years.

== Student organizations ==
Student organizations on campus include arts & culture organizations, performance groups, sports groups, political organizations, religious organizations, and social action groups. Clubs on campus include Alpha Phi Omega, Abbey Players, Campus Activities Board, Classics Society, The History Society, Democrats, Republicans, Green Team, Women in Business, Dance Club, Jazz Band, Hawks for Life, Mock Trial, Psychology Club, Yearbook Club, and Men of Color. The Saint Anselm College chapter of the Knights of Columbus, College Council 4785 in Manchester, New Hampshire, was awarded the 2009–2010 National Community Activity Award for creating a comprehensive recycling program at the New Hampshire State Prison for Women. The Campus Activities Board (CAB), a student-run organization, runs several committees that oversee campus-wide activities and student services. In the past, CAB recruited musical acts including Howie Day, Third Eye Blind, Jason Derulo and Matt Nathanson to perform there. More recent acts have included Marc E. Bassy and Jesse McCartney.

== Student publications ==
The Saint Anselm Crier, founded in 1962 as The Campus Crier by Robert F. Bossie and Robert E. Lemay, is the independent student newspaper of Saint Anselm College. It is published twice monthly when school is in session. The Crier won the 2008–2009 First Place Scholastic Newspaper Award from the American Scholastic Press Association. In 2009, The Saint Anselm Crier adopted new terminology designating the publication as the "independent" student newspaper instead of the "official" student newspaper of Saint Anselm College. This was done to separate student opinion from official college news released by Saint Anselm's public relations department.

The Hilltop, founded in 2009, was an independent student newsletter. It was published bi-weekly, and sought to provide substance over entertainment and integrity over controversy, as some students had supported this publication over the Crier. claiming the latter's quality had deteriorated. In the Fall of 2010, The Hilltop merged with The Saint Anselm Crier after an agreement was made at the urging of the Crier's advisor, Fr. Jerome Day, OSB, who claimed that the college was not large enough for two student newspapers.

The Quatrain, published annually by a small group of students with the help of the English Department and the printing office, is a collection of students' poetry, short stories, and artwork (photographic and otherwise) that is collected via submissions over the course of the academic year and is freely distributed to the student population near the end of the second semester.

The Shank, published each semester, is the History Department's journal consisting exclusively of students' work. The journal is open to all students regardless of their major, as long as the paper submitted was written in a history class.

Lucubrations is the cultural magazine for the Saint Anselm Community. It publishes all forms of creative content online including art, music, photography, literature, poetry, philosophy, commentary, and video from students, faculty, staff, and alumni of the college. It was founded in 2009 by student Dana Nolan (Class of 2011). Submissions are published on an ongoing basis and also collected into digest issues four issues per academic year. The word lucubrations is based on the Latin word lucubrare and means study by candlelight, nocturnal study or meditation, and the writings or thoughts that result.

== Notable staff ==
- Jason Sorens (b. 1976), was the director of the Center for Ethics in Society at Saint Anselm College; quantitative political scientist, nonprofit administrator; founder of the Free State Project
