= Gérard Ghibaudo =

Gerard Ghibaudo is an electrical engineer with IMEP-LAHC, part of the Grenoble Institute of Technology in Grenoble, France. He was named a Fellow of the Institute of Electrical and Electronics Engineers (IEEE) in 2013 for his contributions to electron device characterization and modeling.

== See also ==
- Barbara De Salvo, a student of Ghibaudo
