= DiSalvo =

DiSalvo or Di Salvo is a surname. Notable people with the surname include:

- Antonio Di Salvo (born 1979), Italian-German former footballer
- DyAnne DiSalvo, American artist and author
- Jason DiSalvo (born 1984), American motorcycle racer
- Lino DiSalvo (born 1974), American animator, film director, writer and voice actor
- Steve DiSalvo (born 1949), American professional wrestler
- Steven DiSalvo (born 1962), American academic administrator
- Valter Di Salvo (born 1963), Italian fitness coach formerly with Real Madrid and Manchester United
