= Salvio =

Salvio is a surname. Notable people with the surname include:

- Alessandro Salvio (c. 1570–c. 1640), Italian chess player
- Eduardo Salvio (born 1990), Argentine footballer

== See also ==
- Nicole Di Salvio (born 1979), Italian softball player
- Salvo (surname)
