= Steven DiSalvo =

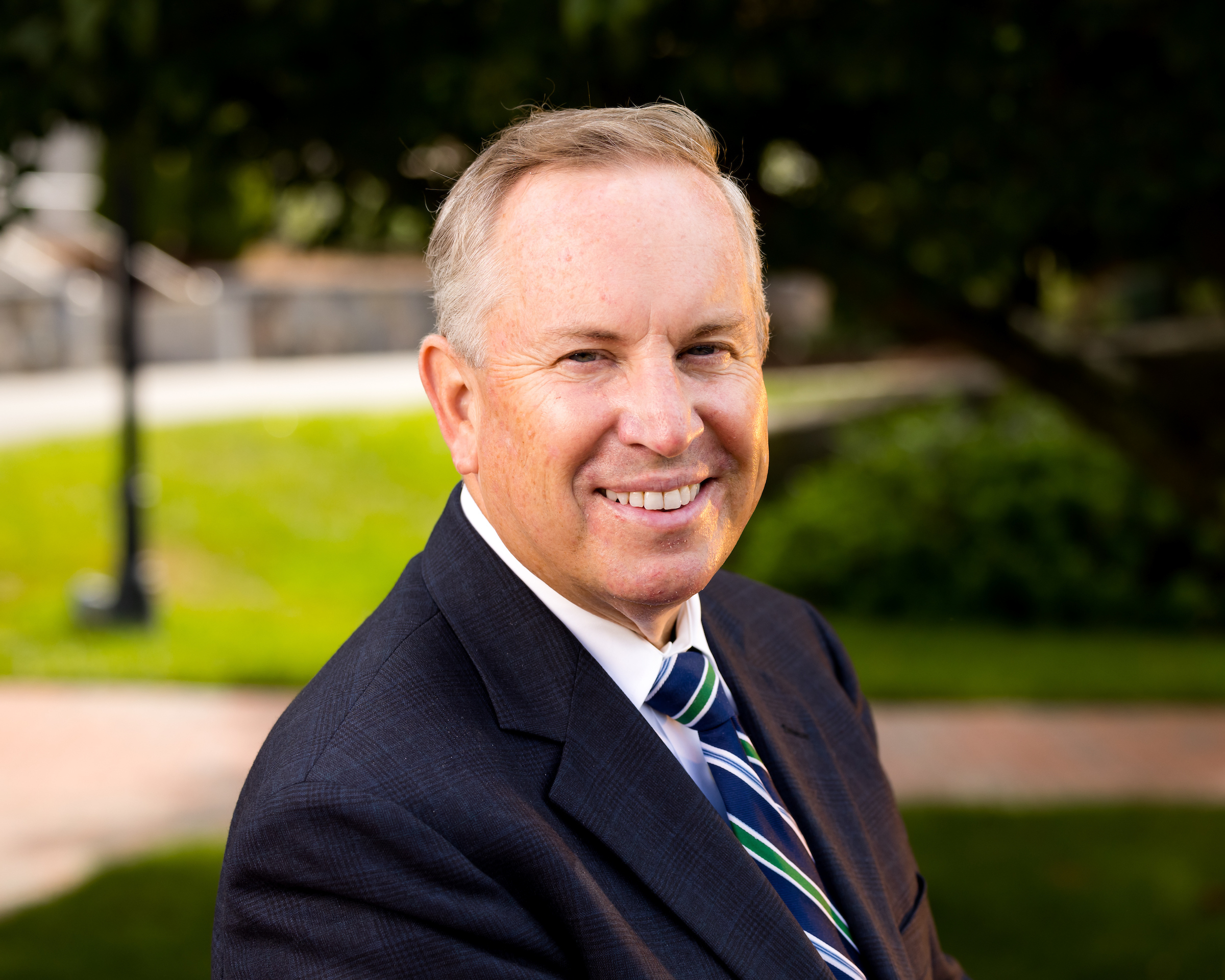

7th President of Endicott College
- In office July 15, 2019 – October 20, 2025

10th President of Saint Anselm College
- In office 2013–2019
- Preceded by: Jonathan DeFelice
- Succeeded by: Joseph A. Favazza

President of Marian University
- In office 2010–2013

Personal details
- Born: January 28, 1962 (age 64)
- Spouse: Eileen DiSalvo (m. 1992)
- Children: 3
- Education: Fordham University

Steven R. DiSalvo (born January 28, 1962) is an American academic administrator who served as the seventh President of Endicott College in Beverly, Massachusetts from March 2019 to October 2025.

== Early life and education ==
DiSalvo was raised in Queens, New York, the only son of Salvatore and Arline DiSalvo. He was raised and educated as a Roman Catholic. DiSalvo attended Fordham University, a Jesuit university, where he earned his Bachelor of Science in psychology, Master of Business Administration in marketing, and Ph.D. in educational leadership.

== Career ==
Prior to assuming his position at Endicott College, DiSalvo served as the President of Saint Anselm College from 2013 to 2019 and Marian University from 2010 to 2013. At Saint Anselm College, DiSalvo succeeded Jonathan DeFelice. On October 12, 2018, Saint Anselm College announced that Dr. DiSalvo will step down as president in June 2019.

On March 27, 2019, the Endicott College Board of Trustees announced that DiSalvo would become the college's seventh president, beginning July 1, 2019.

Since relocating to Boston's North Shore, DiSalvo has served on the boards of the New England Council, Austin Preparatory School, Life Sciences Consortium of the North Shore, Cummings Foundation, and as the Chair of the Commonwealth Coast Conference. He and his wife Eileen have three sons.

On October 20, 2025, following a temporary leave, DiSalvo announced his time as the president of Endicott College would be coming to an end in an effort to prioritize his health and family.
