= Jonathan DeFelice =

American Catholic priest and college president

Jonathan DeFelice, O.S.B.
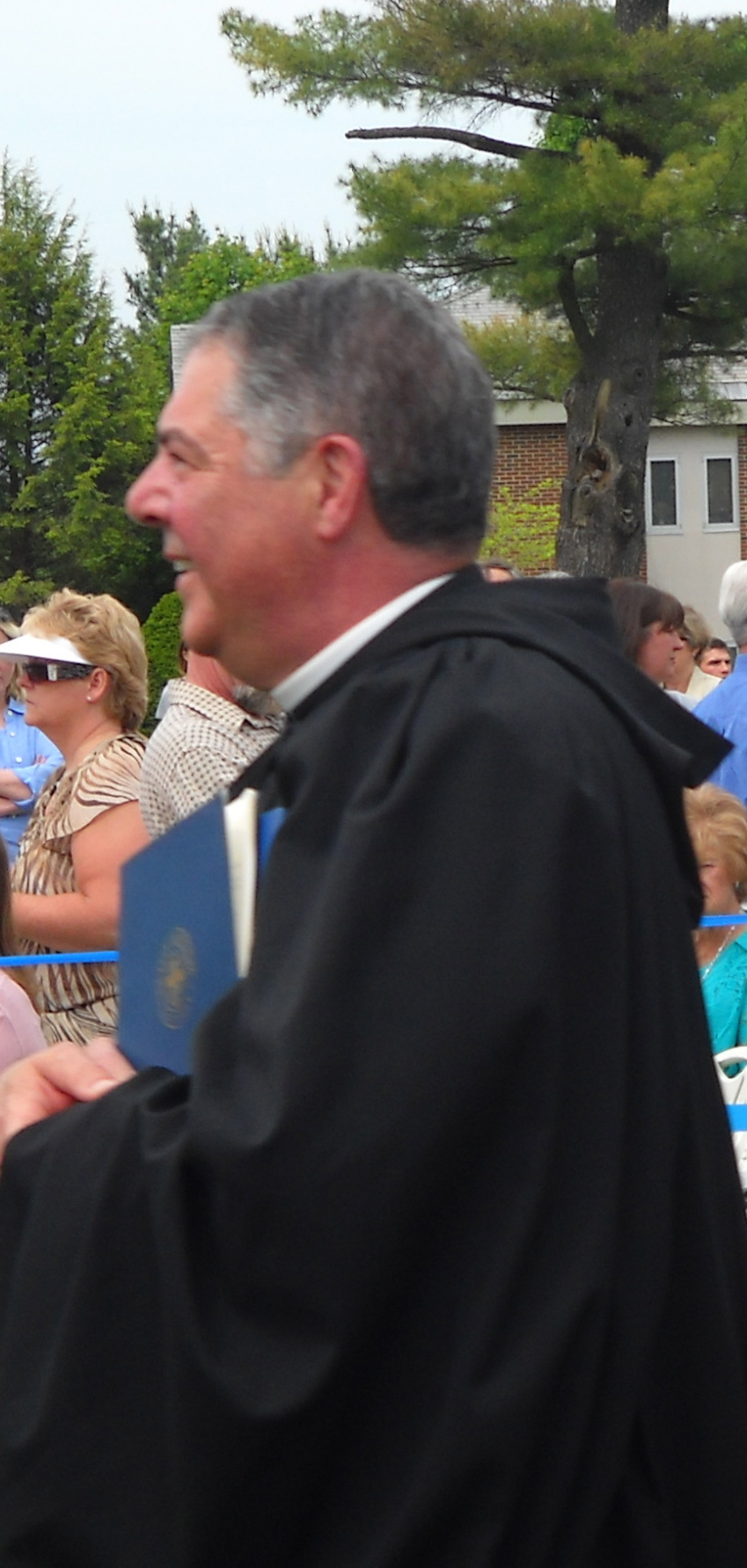
- Father DeFelice processing into the 2010 Saint Anselm College commencement
- Education: Saint Anselm College, Class of 1969
- Title: President Emeritus, Saint Anselm College
- Term: 1989 - June 2013
- Successor: Steven DiSalvo

Jonathan DeFelice OSB is an American Catholic priest and the former President of Saint Anselm College in Goffstown, New Hampshire. Serving the college for 24 years, Father DeFelice was the longest serving college president in the state of New Hampshire.

DeFelice grew up in Bristol, Rhode Island, and graduated from Portsmouth Abbey School in 1965; he then attended Saint Anselm College, earning a bachelor's degree in Philosophy in 1969. He entered Saint Anselm Abbey as a novice in 1968, and professed solemn vows as a Benedictine monk in 1973. He was ordained a Catholic priest in 1974. Defelice was a "Faithful Educator" according to Christy Nadalin in her book, Legendary Locals of Bristol.

He served a five-year term as a member of the New Hampshire Postsecondary Education Commission beginning in 1990 after being sworn in by then Gov. Judd Gregg. Under his leadership, the college sought to expand its inclusiveness efforts to attract both students and faculty of diverse backgrounds.

In May 1992, The Sun Journal reported on Defelice's directive to college employees to discontinue construction contracts with the late Republican U.S. Senate candidate Hal Eckman for his pro-choice position on abortion then.

DeFelice, together with John J. Reilly Jr., and Paul A. Dowd wrote a case study on Successful Fund Raising at a Religious-Based College, which was included in the book, Successful Fund Raising for Higher Education. The Advancement of Learning, by Frank H. T. Rhodes, Ed.

DeFelice stepped down as President in June 2013. He was succeeded by Steven R. DiSalvo.

On March 13, 2015, he received the State Merit Award by the New England Board of Higher Education (NEBHE).
