= Joseph A. Favazza =

American academic administrator

Joseph Favazza
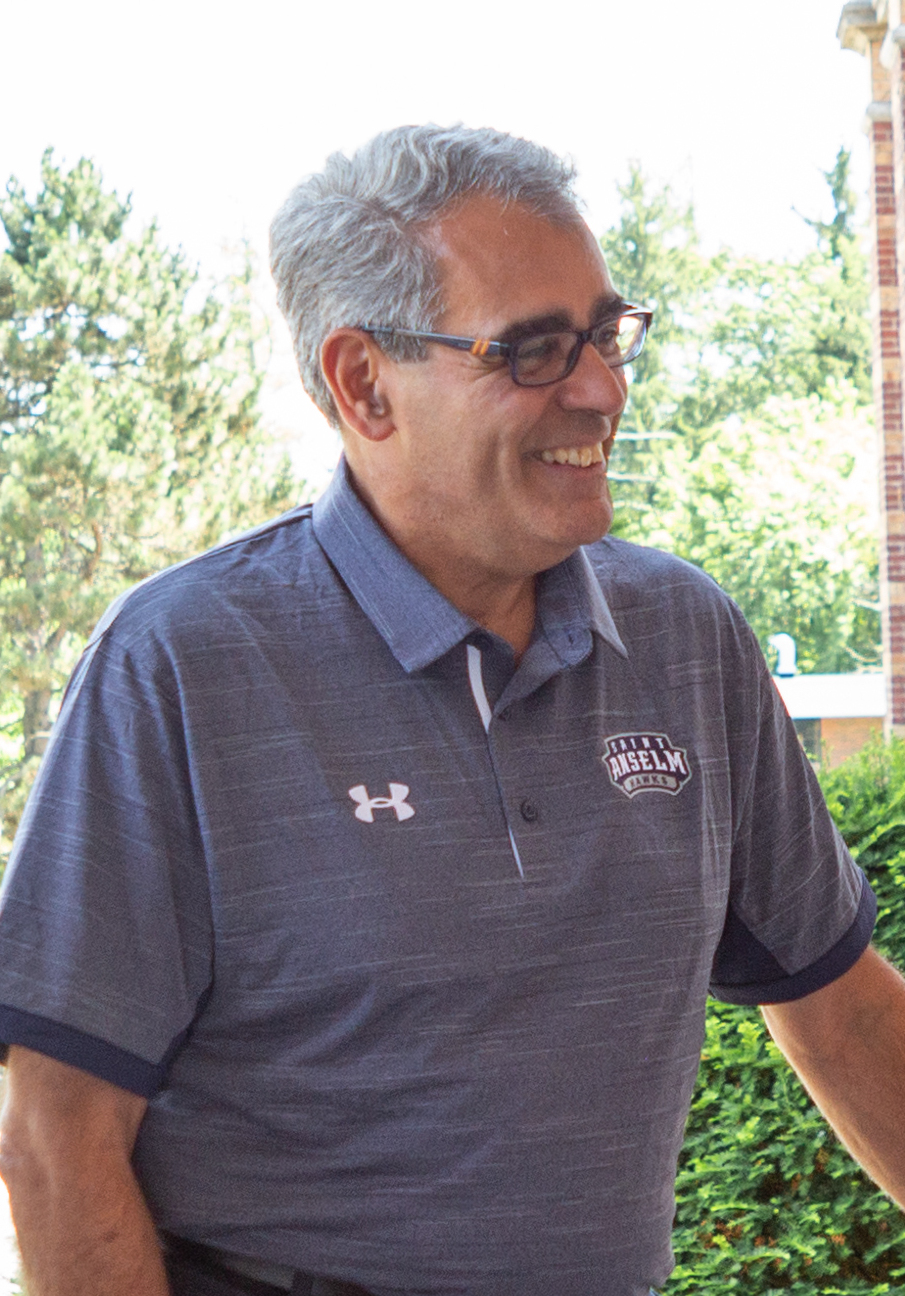
- Favazza in 2019

11th President of Saint Anselm College
- Incumbent
- Assumed office July 15, 2019
- Succeeded by: Michael Lewis

Personal details
- Born: Memphis, Tennessee, U.S.
- Children: 4
- Education: St. Meinrad College (BA); KU Leuven (MA, PhD); Harvard University (GrCirt)

Joseph A. Favazza is an American academic, author, as well as the 11th president and president emeritus of Saint Anselm College.

== Early life and education ==
Favazza is a native of Memphis, Tennessee. He earned a Bachelor of Arts degree in history from the Saint Meinrad Seminary and School of Theology. He took theology courses at the University of St. Michael's College before earning a Master of Arts and PhD in religious studies from KU Leuven. He also earned a certificate in executive management from Harvard Business School.

== Career ==
Favazza began his academic career as a professor of religious studies at Rhodes College and served as the Director of the Search for Values program. In 2005, he became the Dean of General Education at Stonehill College and eventually was appointed as Provost and Vice President for academic affairs. At Stonehill, Favazza guided the restructuring of the academic programs into the Thomas and Donna May School of Arts & Sciences and the Leo J. Meehan School of Business. He also led the development of targeted graduate programs. In July 2019, Favazza was selected to serve as the 11th president of Saint Anselm. He retired President emeritus in 2026.

== Personal life ==
Favazza is the son of Ambrose and Mary Russo Favazza. In addition to a B.A. in history from St. Meinrad College in Indiana, he holds an M.A. and Ph.D. in religious studies from the Catholic University of Louvain, Belgium (Katholieke Universiteit Leuven a/k/a KU Leuven). He is published on a range of topics, from the ritual practices of forgiveness and reconciliation to fundamentals in academic leadership and pedagogy. His books include The Order of Penitents: Historical Roots and Pastoral Future, Removing the Barriers: The Practice of Reconciliation, A Reconciliation Sourcebook, and From Cloister to Commons: Concepts and Models for Service-Learning in Religious Studies.

Favazza's wife, Paddy Cronin Favazza, is a professor and researcher in the field of early childhood education. The couple have four children, including three adopted from Romania.
