= Barbara De Salvo =

Electronics engineer

Barbara De Salvo is an electronics engineer whose work involves the development of advanced computer memory technology and neuromorphic computing architecture. Educated in Italy, France, and the US, she has worked in France and the US. She is Research Director and Silicon Technology Strategist for the Facebook Reality Labs.

== Education and career ==
After earning an engineering degree in 1996 from the University of Parma, De Salvo studied microelectronics at the Grenoble Institute of Technology, completing a Ph.D. in 1999. Her dissertation, Étude du transport électrique et de la fiabilité dans les isolants des mémoires non volatiles a grille flottante, was jointly directed by Gérard Ghibaudo and Georges Pananakakis. She earned a habilitation through Joseph Fourier University in 2007, and has also studied at the MIT Sloan School of Management.

She worked in Grenoble, France, at CEA-Leti: Laboratoire d'électronique des technologies de l'information, beginning in 1999 and including two years from 2013 to 2015 in Albany, New York working as part of an international collaboration with IBM. She became chief scientist and deputy director of CEA-Leti, before moving in 2019 to Meta Platforms and its Reality Labs in Menlo Park, California as Research Director and Silicon Technology Strategist.

== Book ==
De Salvo is the author of the book Silicon Non-Volatile Memories: Paths of Innovation (Wiley, 2009).

== Recognition ==
De Salvo was named an IEEE Fellow, in the 2020 class of fellows, "for contributions to device physics of nonvolatile embedded and stand-alone memories".
