= St. Mary's Abbey Church =

Historic church in New Jersey, United States

- St. Mary's Abbey Church (Newark Abbey)
- U.S. National Register of Historic Places
- New Jersey Register of Historic Places
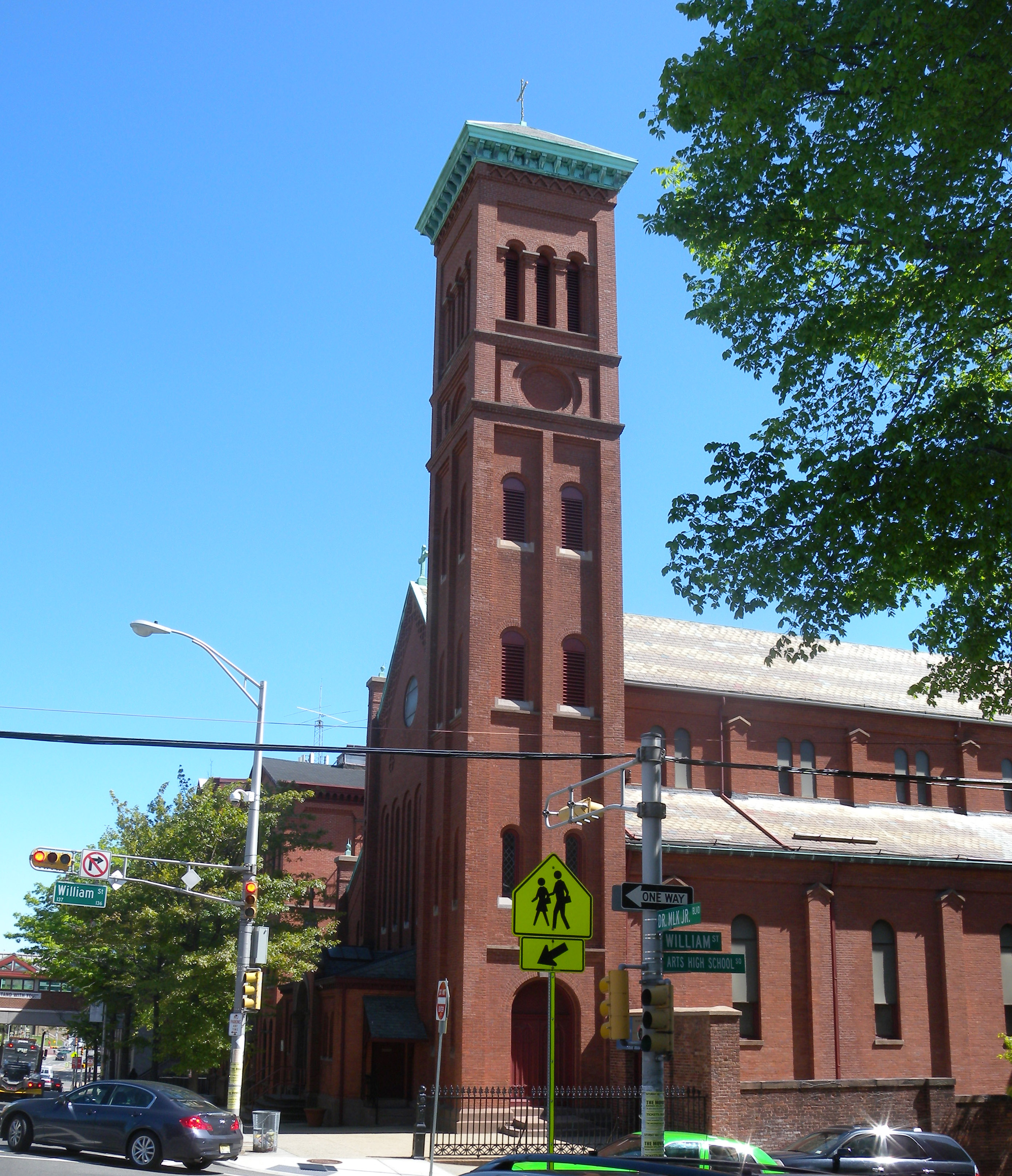

- Location within Essex County, New Jersey Location within New Jersey Location within the United States
- Location: 520 Martin Luther King Jr. Blvd and William Street, Newark, New Jersey
- Coordinates: 40°44′9″N 74°17′13″W
- Area: 1 acre (0.40 ha)
- Built: 1856
- Architect: Henry Engelbert
- Architectural style: German Romanesque Revival
- NRHP reference No.: 72000790
- NJRHP No.
- Added to NRHP: November 03, 1972

St. Mary's Abbey Church, officially the Church of St. Mary of the Immaculate Conception, is a historic Catholic church in the Archdiocese of Newark, located at 528 Martin Luther King Blvd (formerly High St.) and William St. in Newark, New Jersey.

== History ==
The parish was established in 1842 to serve the needs of working-class German-speaking immigrants who worked in Newark's factories. It met originally in a wooden church, but this was destroyed in 1856 by anti-Catholic Know Nothing elements.

The new church was entrusted to the monks of the Order of Saint Benedict, first under the direction of Saint Vincent Archabbey in Latrobe, and then, after becoming an independent institution, by the monks of Newark Abbey, who continue to provide spiritual and academic guidance to the community through the parish and Saint Benedict's Preparatory School.

Construction was completed in 1857. It was added to the National Register of Historic Places in 1972.

== See also ==
- National Register of Historic Places listings in Essex County, New Jersey
