= Daniel Francis Desmond =

American prelate

His Excellency, The Most Reverend Daniel Francis Desmond
- Bishop of Alexandria
- See: Diocese of Alexandria in Louisiana
- Appointed: December 16, 1932
- Installed: 1933
- Term ended: 1945
- Predecessor: Cornelius Van de Ven
- Successor: Charles Pasquale Greco

Orders
- Ordination: June 9, 1911 by Joseph Gaudentius Anderson
- Consecration: January 5, 1933 by John Bertram Peterson

Personal details
- Born: April 4, 1884 Haverhill, Massachusetts, US
- Died: September 11, 1945 (aged 61) Massachusetts
- Denomination: Roman Catholic
- Parents: Daniel and Catherine (née Lynch) Desmond
- Education: College of the Holy Cross (BA); St. John Seminary
- Motto: Evangelizare gratiam (To evangelize grace)

Daniel Francis Desmond (April 4, 1884—September 11, 1945) was an American prelate of the Roman Catholic Church. He served as bishop of the Diocese of Alexandria in Louisiana from 1933 until his death in 1945.

== Biography ==
=== Early life ===
Daniel Desmond was born on April 4, 1884, in Haverhill, Massachusetts, to Daniel and Catherine (née Lynch) Desmond. His father was a shoemaker from Bandon, County Cork in Ireland. After graduating from St. James High School at Haverhill in 1900, Daniel Desmond studied at the College of the Holy Cross in Worcester, obtaining a Bachelor of Arts degree in 1906. He completed his theological studies at St. John's Seminary in Boston.

=== Priesthood ===
Desmond was ordained to the priesthood at St John's for the Archdiocese of Boston by Bishop Joseph Anderson on June 9, 1911. After his ordination, the archdiocese assigned Desmond as a curate at Our Lady of Lourdes Parish in Beachmont, Massachusett. He was transferred in 1912 to St. Joseph Parish in Medford, Massachusetts. During World War I, Desmond enlisted in the US Army Chaplain Corp with the rank of First lieutenant. After his discharge from the Army in 1919, the archdiocese assigned him as a curate at St. Clement Parish in Somerville, Massachusetts. He was named director of the diocesan branch of Catholic Charities in 1926.

=== Bishop of Alexandria ===
On December 16, 1932, Desmond was appointed the fifth bishop of Alexandria by Pope Pius XI. He received his episcopal consecration on January 5, 1933, from Bishop John Peterson, with Bishops Joseph McCarthy and Francis Spellman serving as co-consecrators, at Holy Cross Cathedral in Boston. As bishop in Alexandria, Desmond established 10 new schools, 22 parishes, and 35 churches.

=== Death ===
Daniel Desmond died from a heart attack on September 11, 1945, while visiting family in Massachusetts; he was age 61.

Catholic Church titles
Preceded by Cornelius Van de Ven	Bishop of Alexandria in Louisiana; 1933–1945	Succeeded by Charles Pasquale Greco
