= George Albert Guertin =

American Catholic bishop (1869–1931)

His Excellency, The Most Reverend George Albert Guertin
- bishop of Manchester
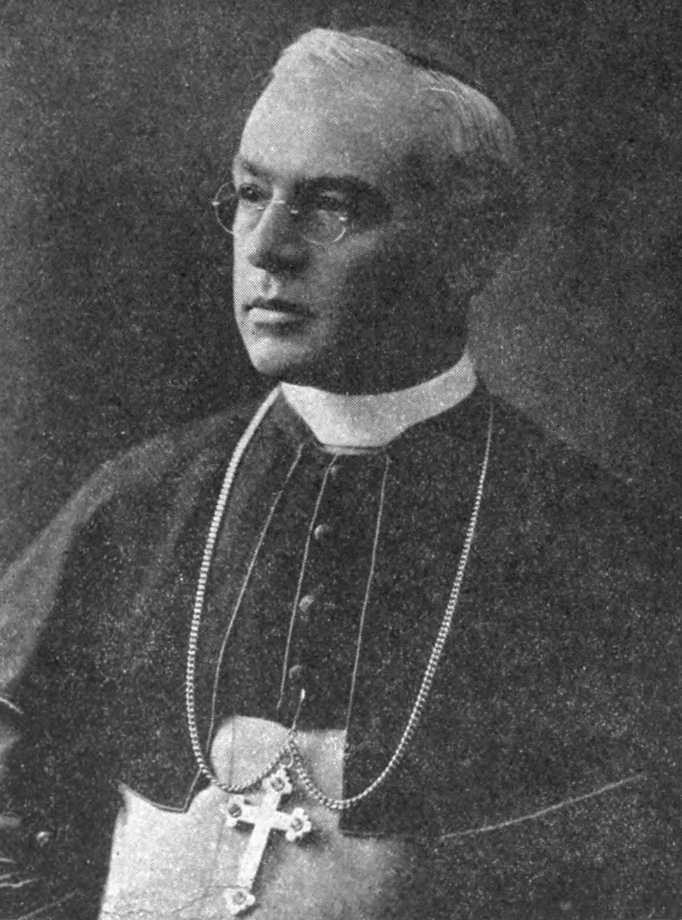
- See: Diocese of Manchester
- In office: March 19, 1907; August 6, 1931
- Predecessor: John Bernard Delany
- Successor: John Bertram Peterson

Orders
- Ordination: December 17, 1892 by Denis Mary Bradley
- Consecration: March 19, 1907 by Diomede Falconio

Personal details
- Born: February 17, 1869 Nashua, New Hampshire, US
- Died: August 6, 1931 (aged 62) Morristown, New Jersey, US
- Education: St. Hyacinthe College; St. Charles College; St. John's Seminary
- Motto: Iter para tutum (Prepare a safe way)
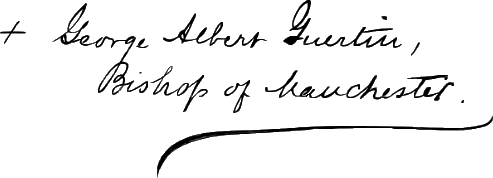
- Signature

George Albert Guertin (February 17, 1869 – August 6, 1931) was an American prelate of the Roman Catholic Church. He served as bishop of the Diocese of Manchester in New Hampshire from 1907 to 1931. Guertin was the first native of New Hampshire and the first French Canadian to be appointed as bishop in the United States. He is the namesake for Bishop Guertin High School

== Biography ==
=== Early life ===
George Albert Guertin was born on February 12, 1869, in Nashua, New Hampshire. He was the son of George Guertin and Louis Lefebvre Guertin, both of French-Canadian descent. The younger George Guertin attended publish school in Nashua, then entered the new parochial school at St. Aloysuis Parish.

Guertin first attended St. Charles College in Sherbrooke, Quebec, then enrolled at St. Hyacinthe College in Saint-Hyacinthe, Quebec. Bishop Denis Bradley then sent Guertin to study theology at St. John's Seminary in Boston, Massachusetts; he was the first graduate of St. John's to become a bishop.

=== Priesthood ===
Guertin was ordained to the priesthood at the Church of Saint Aloysius of Gonzaga in Nashua for the Diocese of Manchester by Bishop Bradley on December 17, 1892. After his ordination, he served as a curate at St. Augustine Parish in Manchester, New Hampshire. Three years and four months later, Guertin was transferred to Sacred Heart Parish in Lebanon, New Hampshire. Guertin was appointed in 1901 as pastor of St. Anthony's Church in Manchester.

=== Bishop of Manchester ===
On January 2, 1907, Guertin was appointed the third bishop of Manchester by Pope Pius X. He received his episcopal consecration at the Cathedral of Saint Joseph in Manchester on March 19, 1907, from Archbishop Diomede Falconio, with Bishops Matthew Harkins and Michael Tierney serving as co-consecrators. After his consecration, Guertin moved into the rectory at the cathedral and promised parishioners there that the parish would remain an English-speaking one. Between 1907 and 1926, Guertin added sixteen new parishes in the diocese; five were French-speaking and two were Polish-speaking. After the American entry into World War I in 1917, Guertin had the diocese purchase a $15,000 war bond; using his own money, he bought $5 war saving stamps for each student in the cathedral parish school.

After the war, the U.S. Government began a push to "Americanize" schools by making English the language of instruction. Guertin approved a State of New Hampshire plan to institute this policy in schools operated by the diocese. However, this plan caused deep anger among French Canadians in the diocese trying to preserve their cultural heritage.

In November 1922, Guertin attempted to mediate a labor dispute in Manchester between the workers at textile mills run by Amoskeag Manufacturing Company and its management. However, company management turned down Guertin's proposal.In September 1930, Guertin issued a decree stating that Catholic parents in the diocese must send their children to Catholic schools or be denied absolution.

=== Death ===
George Guertin died from diabetes in Morristown, New Jersey at the Psychiatric Institute on August 6, 1931, at age 62.

Catholic Church titles
| Preceded by John Bernard Delany | Bishop of Manchester; 1907–1931 | Succeeded by John Bertram Peterson |
