= Anthony Durier =

French-born American prelate (1832–1904)

His Excellency, The Right Reverend Anthony Durier
- Bishop of Natchitoches
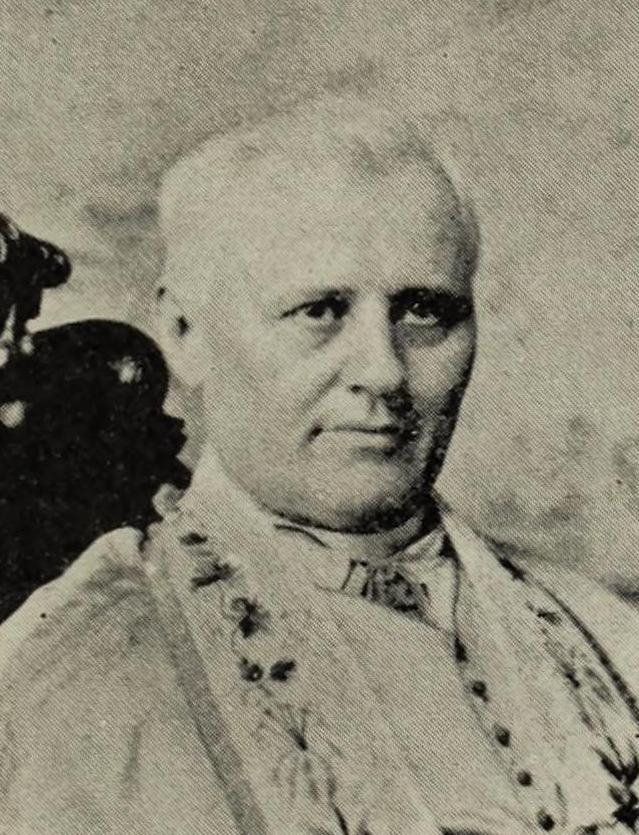
- Church: Catholic Church
- Diocese: Diocese of Natchitoches
- Appointed: December 19, 1884
- Term ended: February 28, 1904 (his death)
- Predecessor: Francis Xavier Leray
- Successor: Cornelius Van de Ven

Orders
- Ordination: October 28, 1856 by John Baptist Purcell
- Consecration: March 19, 1885 by Francis Xavier Leray

Personal details
- Born: August 7, 1832 Saint-Bonnet-des-Quarts, France
- Died: February 28, 1904 (aged 71) Natchitoches, Louisiana
- Education: Seminary of Saint-Irénée; Mount St. Mary's Seminary of the West
- Motto: Spes mea (My hope)

Anthony Durier (August 7, 1832 – February 28, 1904) was a French-born American prelate of the Catholic Church. He served as the third bishop of the Diocese of Natchitoches in Louisianan from 1885 until his death in 1904.

== Biography ==
=== Early life ===
Durier was born on August 7, 1832, in Saint-Bonnet-des-Quarts, Loire in France to Jacques and Claudine (née Lucien) Durier. He made his preparatory studies for the priesthood at the minor seminary in Saint-Jodard, France, before entering the major seminary of Saint-Irénée at Lyon, France, in 1853.

While still a seminarian, he accepted an appeal from Archbishop Antoine Blanc for missionaries in the United States. He departed from Le Havre, France, in October 1855 and arrived in New Orleans in December 1855. However, the diocesan seminary at Plattenville had burned down earlier that year; Durier was sent instead to Cincinnati, Ohio, to complete his theological studies at Mount St. Mary's Seminary of the West.

=== Priesthood ===
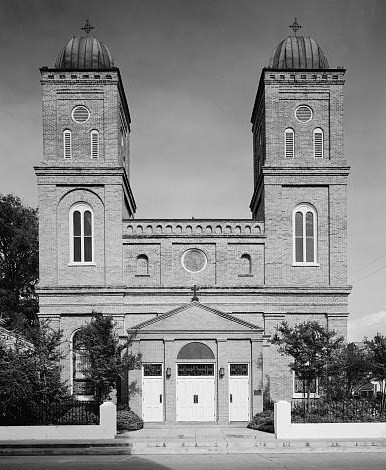
Basilica of the Immaculate Conception, Natchitoches, Louisiana

Durier was ordained a priest for the Archdiocese of Cincinnati on October 28, 1856, by Archbishop John Purcell in Cincinnati. He remained in Ohio for a few months to better his knowledge of English, first serving as assistant pastor in Temperanceville and Chillicothe, Ohio. Durier briefly served as pastor of St. Mary's Parish in Minerton, Ohio before returning to New Orleans in April 1857 to serve as assistant pastor at St. Louis Cathedral Parish.

In 1859, Durier was appointed pastor of the Church of the Annunciation Parish in New Orleans, where he remained for 25 years. He guided the parish through the American Civil War, a yellow fever epidemic in 1878, and many floods. Durier established numerous Catholic schools, including the first school for African-American children in the area. In 1884, he attended the third Plenary Council of Baltimore in Baltimore, Maryland, as a theological consultant to Archbishop Francis Xavier Leray.

=== Bishop of Natchitoches ===
On December 19, 1884, Durier was appointed bishop of Natchitoches by Pope Leo XIII. He received his episcopal consecration on March 19, 1885, from Leray, with Bishops John Neraz and Nicolaus Gallagher serving as co-consecrators, at St. Louis Cathedral in New Orleans.

Durier's most notable contribution as bishop was the advancement of Catholic education. In 1886, he ordered every parish in the diocese to establish a parochial school, and in 1889 he organized the first Catholic school board. He invited several religious orders to the diocese, such as the Sisters of Divine Providence, Carmelites, and Jesuits, who established schools in Alexandria, Mansfield, and Shreveport, all in Louisiana. He opened six schools for African-American children, with a total enrollment of more than 300 pupils in 1894. Durier also established seven new parishes and finished construction on the Cathedral of the Immaculate Conception in Natchitoches, which he consecrated in September 1892.

=== Death ===
Durier died in Natchitoches on February 28, 1904, at age 71. He is buried in the cemetery of the Daughters of the Cross in Shreveport.

== Episcopal succession ==
Catholic Church titles
| Preceded by Francis Xavier Leray | Bishop of Natchitoches; 1885–1904 | Succeeded by Cornelius Van de Ven |
