= Joseph Gaudentius Anderson =

American Roman Catholic bishop

The Right Reverend Joseph Gaudentius Anderson
- Auxiliary Bishop of Boston; Titular Bishop of Myrina
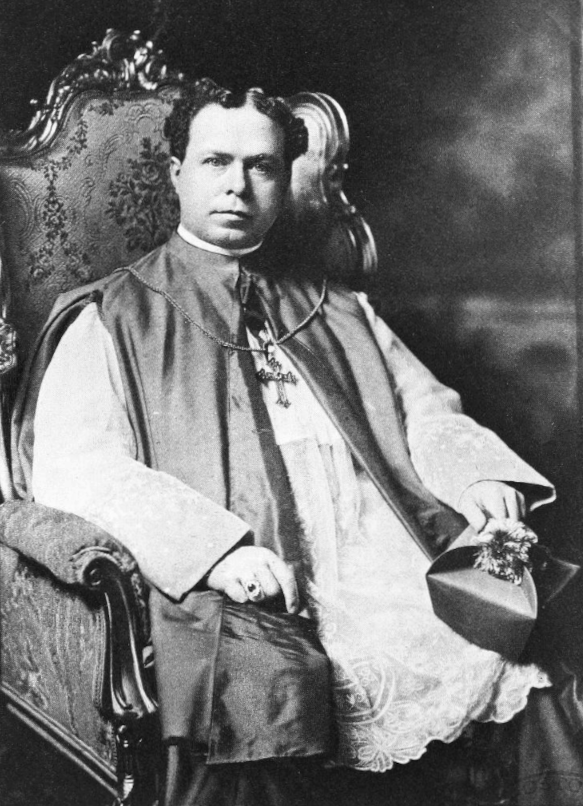
- Church: Catholic Church
- Archdiocese: Boston

Orders
- Ordination: May 20, 1892 by John Joseph Williams
- Consecration: July 27, 1909 by William Henry O’Connell

Personal details
- Born: September 30, 1865 Boston, Massachusetts, US
- Died: July 2, 1927 (aged 61) Boston, Massachusetts,
- Buried: Holy Cross Cemetery; Malden, Massachusetts
- Motto: Fidelitas et vigilantia (Trust and vigilance)
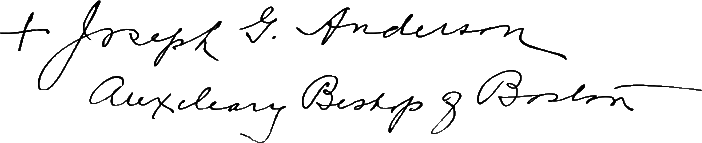
- Signature

Joseph Gaudentius Anderson (September 30, 1865 – July 2, 1927) was an American prelate of the Roman Catholic Church who served as an auxiliary bishop in the Archdiocese of Boston from 1909 to 1927.

== Biography ==
=== Early life ===
John Anderson was born in Boston, Massachusetts, on September 30, 1865, to John J. Anderson and Ellen McVay. After attending public schools in Boston, the younger Anderson entered Boston College. He graduated in 1887 with an Artium Baccalaureus degree. Deciding to become a priest, Anderson entered St. John's Seminary in Boston.

=== Priesthood ===
Anderson was ordained a priest for the Archdiocese of Boston by Archbishop John Joseph Williams in Boston on May 20, 1892. After his ordination, the archdiocese assigned Anderson as a curate at St. Anne Parish in Neponset, Massachusetts. He was later transferred to St. Joseph Parish in Boston. In 1894, the archdiocese named Anderson as chaplain at the Charlestown State Prison in Charlestown, Massachusetts and at the Charles Street Jail in Boston.

In 1903, Anderson was named as a director of the Catholic Charitable Bureau for the archdiocese. That same year, the archdiocese appointed him as pastor of St. Paul Parish in Boston. Archbishop William Henry O’Connell named Anderson as vicar general of the archdiocese in 1909. That same year, he received a Doctor of Divinity degree in Rome and was named a prothonotary apostolic by the Vatican.

=== Auxiliary Bishop of Boston ===
On April 29, 1909, Pope Pius X named Anderson as titular bishop of Myrina and as an auxiliary bishop of Boston. He was consecrated on July 27, 1909, at the Cathedral of the Holy Cross in Boston by O’Connell.

As auxiliary bishop, Anderson was the vice president of St. Elizabeth's Hospital in Boston, the Working Boys Home in Newton, Massachusetts, the Daly Industrial School in Boston and the Working Girls Home in Boston.

=== Death ===
Anderson died in Boston on July 2, 1927. He was buried in Holy Cross Cemetery in Malden, Massachusetts.
