= Henry A. Walsh =

American priest

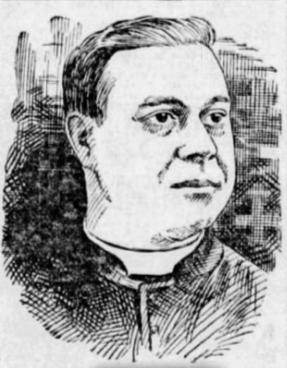
Fr. Henry A. Walsh

Henry A. Walsh was an American priest of the Archdiocese of Boston.

== Personal life ==
Walsh was born in Newton, Massachusetts but moved as a child to East Boston where he attended the Chapman School. He then attended Boston College and graduated in 1883. He attended the Grand Séminaire de Montréal for several years until Saint John's Seminary in Boston was complete. Once it was, he transferred to St. John's and was ordained as a member of their first class.

He had two brothers, one of whom was also a priest.

== Ministry ==
He was ordained June 25, 1887 at the Cathedral of the Holy Cross by Bishop Matthew Harkins. He was well known within the diocese.

Walsh's first assignment was to St. Mary's Church in Randolph, Massachusetts. He remained there for 10 years. Walsh then spent 10 years as an assistant pastor at St. Charles' parish in Woburn, Massachusetts. In 1902, while saying mass for more than 700 people, a fire was discovered in the church. Walsh alerted the congregation and asked them to calmly leave the church, which they did.

In 1908, Walsh became a pastor for the first time at Sacred Heart Church in South Natick. In 1917, Walsh was made the first pastor of a newly created parish in Needham, Massachusetts.

When Walsh was transferred from Needham to St. Mary's Church in Dedham, a public reception was held for him at the town hall. He arrived in Dedham on July 16, 1923. As the construction on the church had recently been finished, Walsh was able to focus on the various groups and societies within the parish. His pastorate ended with his death in 1929.

== Death ==
Walsh died on February 2, 1929, at the St. Mary's rectory of pneumonia.

== Works cited ==
- Smith, Frank (1936). A History of Dedham, Massachusetts. Transcript Press.
- Byrne, William; Leahy, W. A.; Dowling, Austin; Young, E. J. A.; Finen, J. E. (1899). Introductory. The Hurd & Everts co. pp. 323–324.
- Sullivan, James S. (1895). One hundred years of progress: a graphic, historical, and pictorial account of the Catholic Church of New England, Archdiocese of Boston. Boston: Illistrated Publishing Company. OL 24364821M.
