= Cornelius Van de Ven =

Dutch-born American prelate (1865–1932)

His Excellency, The Most Reverend Cornelius Van de Ven
- Bishop of Alexandria
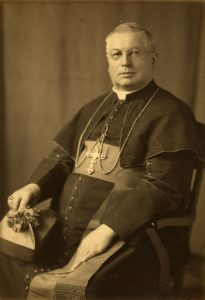
- Church: Catholic Church
- See: Diocese of Alexandria
- Appointed: August 10, 1904
- Term ended: May 8, 1932 (his death)
- Predecessor: Anthony Durier
- Successor: Daniel Francis Desmond

Orders
- Ordination: May 31, 1890 by Adrianus Godschalk
- Consecration: November 30, 1904 by Placide Louis Chapelle

Personal details
- Born: June 16, 1865 Oirschot, Netherlands
- Died: May 8, 1932 (aged 66) Shreveport, Louisiana

Cornelius Van de Ven (June 16, 1865 – May 8, 1932) was a Dutch-born American prelate of the Catholic Church. He served as the fourth bishop of Alexandria in Louisiana from 1910 until his death in 1932. He previously served as bishop of the Diocese of Natchitoches in Louisiana from 1904 until its dissolution in 1910.

== Biography ==
=== Early life ===
Cornelius Van de Ven was born on June 16, 1865, in Oirschot, in the southern Netherlands, to Peter Van de Ven and Joanna Maria Roche. After receiving his early education in Sint-Michielsgestel, Netherland, he began his studies for the priesthood and attended the diocesan seminary in Haaren, Netherland. While still a seminarian, Van de Ven accepted an appeal from Archbishop Francis Janssens of New Orleans for missionaries in the United States. His uncle, Reverend Cornelius J. Roche, had already immigrated and served as pastor in Michigan.

=== Priesthood ===
Van de Ven was ordained a priest in s-Hertogenbosch in the Netherlands for the Archdiocese of New Orleans on May 31, 1890, by Bishop Adrianus Godschalk. He sailed from Antwerp, Belgium, five months later and arrived in New York City in November 1890. He made his way to Louisiana, where the archdiocese immediately appointed him assistant pastor of St. Peter's Parish in New Iberia.

In 1891, Van de Ven served as the founding pastor of Our Lady Help of Christians Parish in Jennings, Louisiana. The next year, he was assigned as pastor at Immaculate Conception Parish in Lake Charles, Louisiana. His final pastoral assignment was in 1902 as pastor of St. Joseph's Parish in Baton Rouge, Louisiana.

=== Bishop of Natchitoches ===
On August 10, 1904, Van de Ven was appointed to succeed the late Bishop Anthony Durier as bishop of Natchitoches by Pope Pius X. He received his episcopal consecration on November 30, 1904, from Archbishop Placide Chapelle, with Bishops Thomas Heslin and Gustave Rouxel serving as co-consecrators, at St. Louis Cathedral in New Orleans. At 39, Van de Ven was one of the youngest Catholic bishops in the country.

=== Bishop of Alexandria ===
The most important act of Van de Ven's administration was transferring the seat of the diocese from Natchitoches to Alexandria, Louisiana, a railroad town with a large Catholic population. The Diocese of Natchitoches was renamed the Diocese of Alexandria on August 6, 1910, and St. Francis Xavier Church in Alexandria was designated as the new cathedral. Van de Ven recruited the Sisters of Charity of the Incarnate Word to the diocese, where they established North Louisiana's first Catholic hospital (Schumpert Medical Center in Shreveport, Louisiana) and St. Joseph's Orphanage. He promoted lay organizations and served as state chaplain of the Knights of Columbus. During his tenure, new churches and parochial schools were established for African-American Catholics in Marksville and Mansura, Louisiana. In 1929, he was named an assistant to the papal throne by Pope Pius XI.

=== Death ===
Cornelius Van de Ven died on May 8, 1932, at Schumpert Medical Center at age 66.

== Notes ==
Catholic Church titles
Preceded by (Diocese name change)	Bishop of Alexandria in Louisiana; 1910–1932	Succeeded by Daniel Francis Desmond
Preceded by Anthony Durier	Bishop of Natchitoches; 1904–1910	Succeeded by –
