= Hugh F. Blunt =

American Catholic priest and writer (1877–1957)

Monsignor Hugh Francis Blunt (January 20, 1877 – March 22, 1957) was a Catholic priest, author, poet, and apologist. He was born in Medway, Massachusetts, to Irish immigrants Patrick Blunt and Ann Mahon. Blunt began writing while attending St. Laurent College in Montreal.

After his graduation in 1896, he attended St. John's Seminary in Brighton, Massachusetts, to become a Catholic priest, and was ordained on December 20, 1901. He was appointed to churches in Stoneham, Dorchester, and Cambridge, Massachusetts, and did a great deal of writing over the course of his career. His best-known books include The Great Magdalens: Famous Women Who Returned to God Following a Life of Sin, The Great Penitents and Great Wives and Mothers, all of which are still in print. He also served as chief editorial writer for The Pilot newspaper and editor of the Sacred Heart Review.

Blunt received the Marian Poetry Prize in 1919 and the Catholic Press Poetry Prize in 1929. In 1920, he was awarded an honorary doctorate by the University of Notre Dame for his contributions to Catholic literature.

== Published works ==
- Blunt, Hugh F. (1911). Poems. The Rumford Press.
- ——— (1912). Songs for Sinners. The Devin-Adair Company.
- ——— (1914). Fred Carmody, Pitcher. The Devin-Adair Company.
- ——— (1917). Great Wives and Mothers. The Devin-Adair Company.
- ——— (1921). Great Penitents. The Macmillan Company.
- ——— (1921). My Own People. The Magnificat Press.
- ——— (1924). The Book of the Mother of God. The Magnificat Press.
- ——— (1925). Spiritual Songs. The Magnificat Press.
- ——— (1926). Homely Spirituals. The Macmillan Company.
- ——— (1928). The Great Magdalens. The Macmillan Company.
- ——— (1929). Witnesses to the Eucharist. The Magnificat Press.
- ———, ed. (1934). Readings from Cardinal O'Connell. Appleton-Century.
- ——— (1934). Give This Man Place: Chapters on the Life and Character of Saint Joseph. The Sign Press.
- ——— (1937). The Road of Pain. Joseph F. Wagner.
- ——— (1938). Seven Swords: Considerations on the Seven Great Sorrows of Our Blessed Lady. P. J. Kenedy & Sons.
- ——— (1938). Old Nuns and Other Poems. The Magnificat Press.
- ——— (1939). Mary's Garden of Roses. P. J. Kenedy & Sons.
- ——— (1940). Listen, Mother of God: Thoughts on the Litany of Loreto. Catholic Literary Guild.
- ——— (1941). The New Song: Thoughts on the Beatitudes. Catholic Literary Guild.
- ——— (1942). Life With the Holy Ghost: Thoughts on the Gifts of the Holy Ghost. Bruce Publishing Co.
- ——— (1945). The Quality of Mercy: Thoughts on the Works of Mercy. Bruce Publishing Co.
- ——— (1947). The Heart Aflame: Thoughts on Devotion to the Sacred Heart. Bruce Publishing Co.

== Additional sources ==
- Paul R. Clancy and Shirley Elder, Tip: The Biography of Thomas P. O'Neill, Speaker of the House
- John A. Farrell, Tip O'Neill and the Democratic Century
- Paula M. Kane, Separatism and Subculture: Boston Catholicism, 1900-1920
- J. Gordon Melton, Religious leaders of America: a biographical guide to founders and leaders
- Francis O'Neill, Irish minstrels and musicians: with numerous dissertations on related subjects
- John Drane and Piers Paul Read, The Gospel of St. John: the story of the Son of God
- George E. Ryan, Figures in our Catholic History
