= John Bernard Delany =

His Excellency, The Right Reverend John Bernard Delany
- Bishop of Manchester
- See: Diocese of Manchester
- In office: September 8, 1904 - June 11, 1906
- Predecessor: Denis Mary Bradley
- Successor: George Albert Guertin

Orders
- Ordination: May 23, 1891 by François-Marie-Benjamin Richard
- Consecration: September 8, 1904 by Diomede Falconio

Personal details
- Born: August 9, 1864 Lowell, Massachusetts
- Died: June 11, 1906 (aged 41) Manchester, New Hampshire
- Denomination: Roman Catholic
- Education: College of the Holy Cross; Boston College; Seminary of Saint-Sulpice
- Motto: Cor Jesu spes mea (The heart of Jesus is my hope)

John Bernard Delany (August 9, 1864 – June 11, 1906) was an American prelate of the Roman Catholic Church. He served as bishop of the Diocese of Manchester in New Hampshire from 1904 to 1906.

== Biography ==
=== Early life ===
John Delany was born on August 9, 1864, in Lowell, Massachusetts, to Thomas Delany and Catherine Fox Delany, both Irish immigrants. As a young man, he studied the classics and philosophy for two years at the College of the Holy Cross in Worcester, Massachusetts. He then entered Boston College, graduating in June 1887.

After his graduation, Delany met with Bishop Denis Bradley and asked to be part of the new Diocese of Manchester. At Bradley's suggestion, Delany went to Paris in 1887 to study for the priesthood at the Seminary of Saint-Sulpice in Paris.

=== Priesthood ===
Delany was ordained to the priesthood for the Diocese of Manchester in Paris by Cardinal François-Marie-Benjamin Richard on May 23, 1891. When asked by his peers why Delany wanted to serve in a new, poor parish, he replied: "I am not to be a priest for what I can get out of it, but for what I can put into it. I go to New Hampshire."

Following his return to New Hampshire in 1891, Delany was appointed as curate at St. Anne's Parish in Manchester. After two and a half years, he was transferred to Immaculate Conception Parish in Portsmouth, New Hampshire. According to contemporary accounts, he was a frequent visitor to the sick in the hospitals. On several occasions, he paid out of his own pocket for children to see medical specialists in Boston. He was respectful of others and made many friendships with non-Catholics.

In 1898, Delany became chancellor of the diocese and secretary to Bishop Denis Bradley. Delany was founder and editor of the diocesan newspaper The Guidon. When the Sisters of the Sacred Blood moved into the diocese, he was appointed as their chaplain. Delany also served as state chaplain for the Knights of Columbus and director of the Priests Temperance League. When a railroad was being constructed in the diocese, Delany visited the workers, many of whom were Catholic, in their camp. In September 1902, he accompanied other clergy on a mission trip to Havana, Cuba.

=== Bishop of Manchester ===
On April 18, 1904, Delany was appointed as the second bishop of Manchester by Pope Pius X. He received his episcopal consecration on September 8, 1904, from Archbishop Diomede Falconio, with Bishops William O'Connell and Edward Allen serving as co-consecrators, at the Cathedral of St. Joseph in Manchester, New Hampshire.

John Delany died at Sacred Heart Hospital in Manchester after suffering an appendicitis, on June 11, 1906, at age 41. His tenure as bishop lasted only 21 months.

Catholic Church titles
Preceded by Denis Mary Bradley	Bishop of Manchester; 1904–1906	Succeeded by George Albert Guertin
