= William Laurence Sullivan =

William Laurence Sullivan (November 15, 1872 – October 5, 1935) was an American Unitarian clergyman, prolific author and literary critic, whose Letters to His Holiness, Pope Pius X (1910), was the last work by a U.S. author to have been placed on Vatican's list of prohibited books (Index Librorum Prohibitorum).

== Early life and education ==
A native of East Braintree, Massachusetts, Sullivan was born only a year after his parents, Patrick and Joanna (Desmon) Sullivan, had emigrated from the Irish town of Bandon in County Cork. The family subsequently moved to Quincy, Massachusetts. His father died when William was fourteen. He chose the confirmation name "Laurence" in honor of Lawrence of Rome, deacon and martyr. Intent on becoming a priest, he studied, between 1892 and 1896, at Boston College and St. John's Seminary in the Brighton section of Boston, where he took the degree of Ph.B.

== Career ==
=== Catholic priest ===
He joined the Paulist community at Catholic University of America in Washington, D.C. and received degrees of S.T.B. and S.T.L. He was ordained a priest in 1899. From 1899 to 1901 Sullivan served as a Paulist mission-preacher in Tennessee but returned to Washington due to poor health. He was assigned to parish work, teaching and writing for the Catholic Word. For several years he was Professor of Sacred Scripture and Theology at St. Thomas's College.

He also contributed articles to the New York Sun and the New York Review, usually under a pseudonym. Under threat of dismissal for liberalism in his scripture courses, Sullivan requested to be relieved of his teaching duties and in 1908 was transferred back to parish ministry and mission work. In 1910 he resigned his pastorate in Austin, Texas, severed his ties with the Church, and wrote a polemic on papal authority, "Letters to His Holiness Pope Pius X".

=== Unitarian minister ===
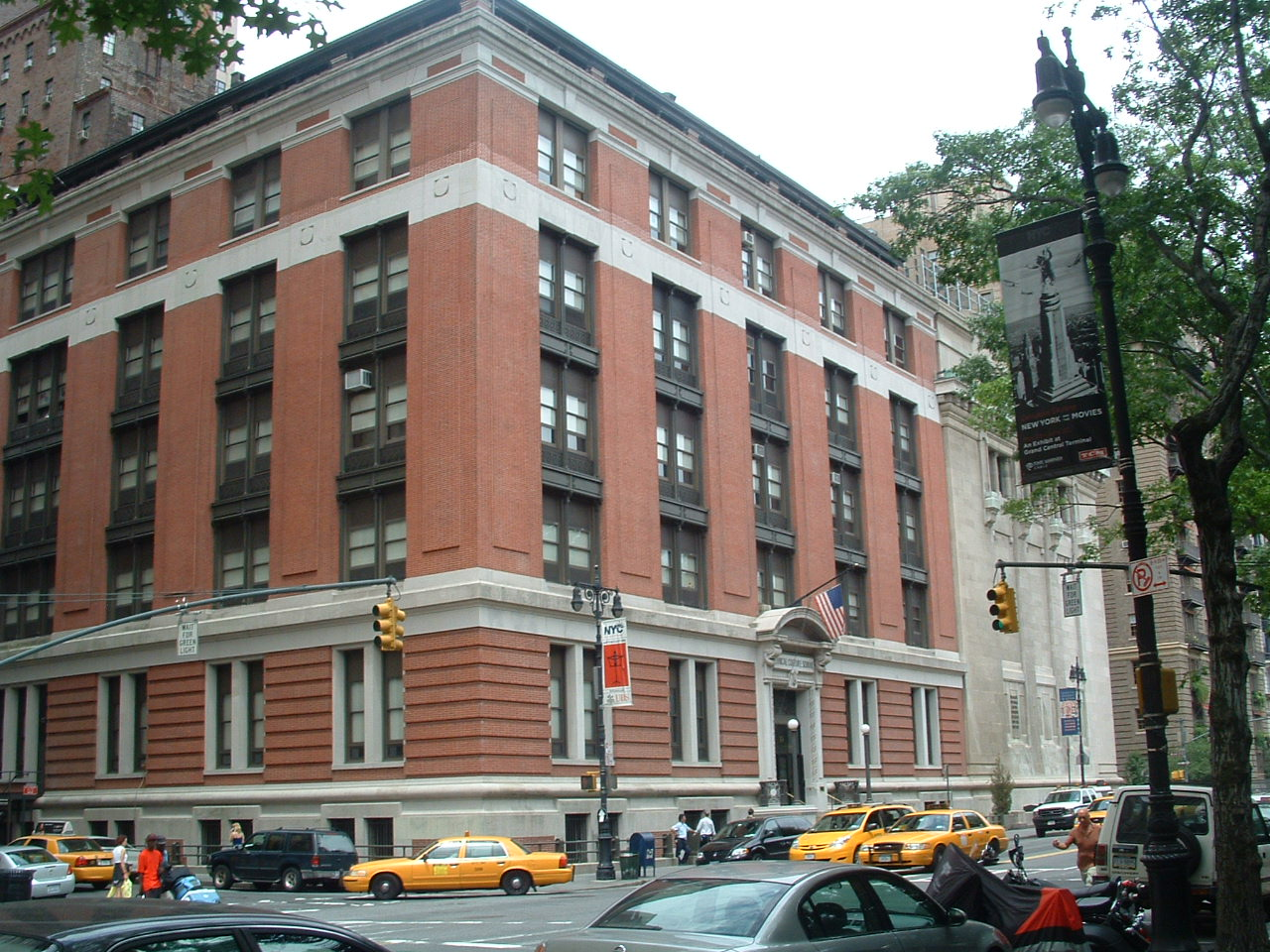
Ethical Culture School, 33 Central Park West

In October 1910, while living in Cleveland, Sullivan affiliated with the American Unitarian Association. From 1911 to 1912 he taught English and history at Felix Adler's Ethical Culture School in New York. In 1912, he became a Unitarian minister, and served at All Souls Church in Schenectady, New York, moving, the following year, to New York City's All Souls Church in Manhattan, where he remained for the next nine years, until 1922.

During this period he also spent six years as a book reviewer for one of the most prestigious of the city's many daily newspapers, The Herald Tribune. Known for the eloquence of his sermons, he was much in demand as a speaker, especially after another of the city's papers, The Evening Post, started publishing his sermons. An indefatigable preacher, he delivered over forty sermons during a single month in 1916, while traveling in the West Coast for the Church. In 1917 he received a D.D. from Meadville Theological School. Also in 1917 he was the Dudleian lecturer at Harvard.

At the close of his service in New York, he spent the following two years, 1922–24, preaching in 23 missions across the U.S. and Canada. During the 1920s, he led and participated in numerous theological discussions, disagreements and controversies regarding theism and the encroachment of humanism, which he opposed. From 1924 to 1928 he served as pastor in Missouri at St. Louis' Church of the Messiah, taught at Meadville Theological School and traveled as a lecturer.

William Laurence Sullivan married Frances Estelle Throckmorton in 1913, the daughter of Hugh William Throckmorton and Rebecca Ellen Upton, and the granddaughter of U.S. Representative Charles Horace Upton (R-VA), all of Washington, DC. The marriage lasted twenty-two years, until his death, in Germantown, Pennsylvania, six weeks prior to his 63rd birthday. In 1929 he had accepted the Germantown ministry, his final one, where, after six years as a pastor, he was memorialized as "...towering in his ability to lift and to lead, yet warmly near in his tender concern for the smallest human suffering; a man oppressed by the problems of this world's evil, but radiant in his faith in a Kingdom yet to be".

== Sources ==
- Sullivan, William Laurence. Under Orders (1944). Autobiography, published posthumously.
