= John Bertram Peterson =

American prelate

His Excellency, The Most Reverend John Bertram Peterson
- Bishop of Manchester; Titular Bishop of Hippos
- Church: Roman Catholic
- Diocese: Diocese of Manchester
- Predecessor: George Albert Guertin
- Successor: Matthew Francis Brady
- Other posts: Auxiliary Bishop of Boston; 1927 to 1932

Orders
- Ordination: September 15, 1899 by John Brady
- Consecration: November 10, 1927 by William Henry O'Connell

Personal details
- Born: July 15, 1871 Salem, Massachusetts, U.S.
- Died: March 15, 1944 (aged 72) Manchester, New Hampshire, U.S.
- Motto: Christus petra (Christ is the rock)

John Bertram Peterson (July 15, 1871 – March 15, 1944) was an American prelate of the Roman Catholic Church. He served as bishop of the Diocese of Manchester in New Hampshire from 1932 until his death in 1944. He previously served as an auxiliary bishop of the Archdiocese of Boston in Massachusetts from 1927 to 1932

== Biography ==
=== Early life ===
Peterson was born in Salem, Massachusetts, to a Scandinavian sea captain and an Irish mother. He attended a commercial college in Boston and then worked at Pope Manufacturing Company; he also served as a newspaper reporter.

After deciding to join the priesthood, Peterson entered Marist College in Van Buren, Maine. He then studied at Saint Anselm College in Goffstown, New Hampshire, from 1893 to 1895 and then entered St. John's Seminary in Boston.

=== Priesthood ===
Peterson was ordained a priest in Boston for the Archdiocese of Boston by Auxiliary Bishop John Brady on September 15, 1899. After two years studying church history in Paris and Rome, Peterson returned to Boston. Peterson was appointed as a faculty member in 1911 at St. John's Seminary, teaching economics. He was later appointed rector, staying at the seminary until 1926.

=== Auxiliary Bishop of Boston ===
On October 7, 1927, Peterson was appointed auxiliary bishop of Boston and titular bishop of Hippos by Pope Pius XI. He received his episcopal consecration at the Cathedral of the Holy Cross in Boston on November 10, 1927, from Cardinal William Henry O'Connell, with Bishops George Albert Guertin and John Gregory Murray serving as co-consecrators. During his time as auxiliary bishop, he also served as pastor of St. Catherine of Genoa Parish in Somerville, Massachusetts.

While in Somerville, Peterson gained a reputation as a good administrator and educator. He also held several diocesan positions during this period. In 1930, U.S. President Herbert Hoover appointed Peterson to a national commission to survey education in the United States.

==== Bishop of Manchester ====
Peterson was named the fourth bishop of Manchester by Pius XI on May 13, 1932. He was installed by Cardinal O'Connor at the Cathedral of St. Joseph in Manchester, New Hampshire, on July 14, 1932. New Hampshire Governor John Winant attended the installation, along with 600 priests from New England and several hundred parishioners from St. Catherine of Genoa Parish in Massachusetts.

A major area of tension in the diocese came from ethnic strife between the Irish and French-Canadian communities. A French speaker, Peterson told a Manchester dinner audience in 1932 that he condemned all religious and ethnic hatred and would not support any cause based in hatred. He was able to gain the trust of French-Canadian Catholics in the diocese with his words and actions. In March 1933, in the middle of the national bank run after the stock market crash of 1929, Peterson reassured parishioners that the banks would survive.

In May 1933, Peterson settled a contentious labor strike in Manchester between the Amoskeag Company and its 7,400 unionized mill workers. The union called a walkout when company management tried to lower wages by 40%. The state had deployed the New Hampshire National Guard to Manchester and clashes had occurred with the strikers. After canvassing many union members, Peterson went to the company management and successfully negotiated a 15 cent per hour wage increase, settling the strike.

In April 1934, in the midst of the Great Depression, Peterson enacted austerity spending measures for the diocese. He was a member of a New Hampshire delegation that traveled to Washington D.C. in March and April 1935 to lobby the U.S. Congress for help for the textile industry in New Hampshire. That same year, Pius XI appointed Peterson as an attendant to the papal throne and a county of the Vatican City state.

In 1936, Peterson was named as president general of the National Catholic Education Association, serving in that role until 1946. After the American entry into World War II in December 1941, Peterson urged parishes and parishioners to invest in war stamps and war bonds. The diocese opened a USO center for servicemen and women in Manchester, and he urged parishioners to support the organization with donations.

=== Death ===
Peterson died on March 15, 1944, at age 72 in Manchester. One of his former students at St. John's was the future Cardinal Richard Cushing, who delivered the eulogy at Peterson's funeral. According to Cushman, Peterson would tell his seminarians, "Take your priesthood seriously, never yourself." Peterson was buried in the crypt at the Cathedral of St. Joseph.

Catholic Church titles
| Preceded by George Albert Guertin | Bishop of Manchester; 1932–1944 | Succeeded by Ernest John Primeau |
