= Denis Mary Bradley =

Irish-American Roman Catholic bishop and educationist (1846–1903)

His Excellency, The Right Reverend Denis Mary Bradley
- Bishop of Manchester
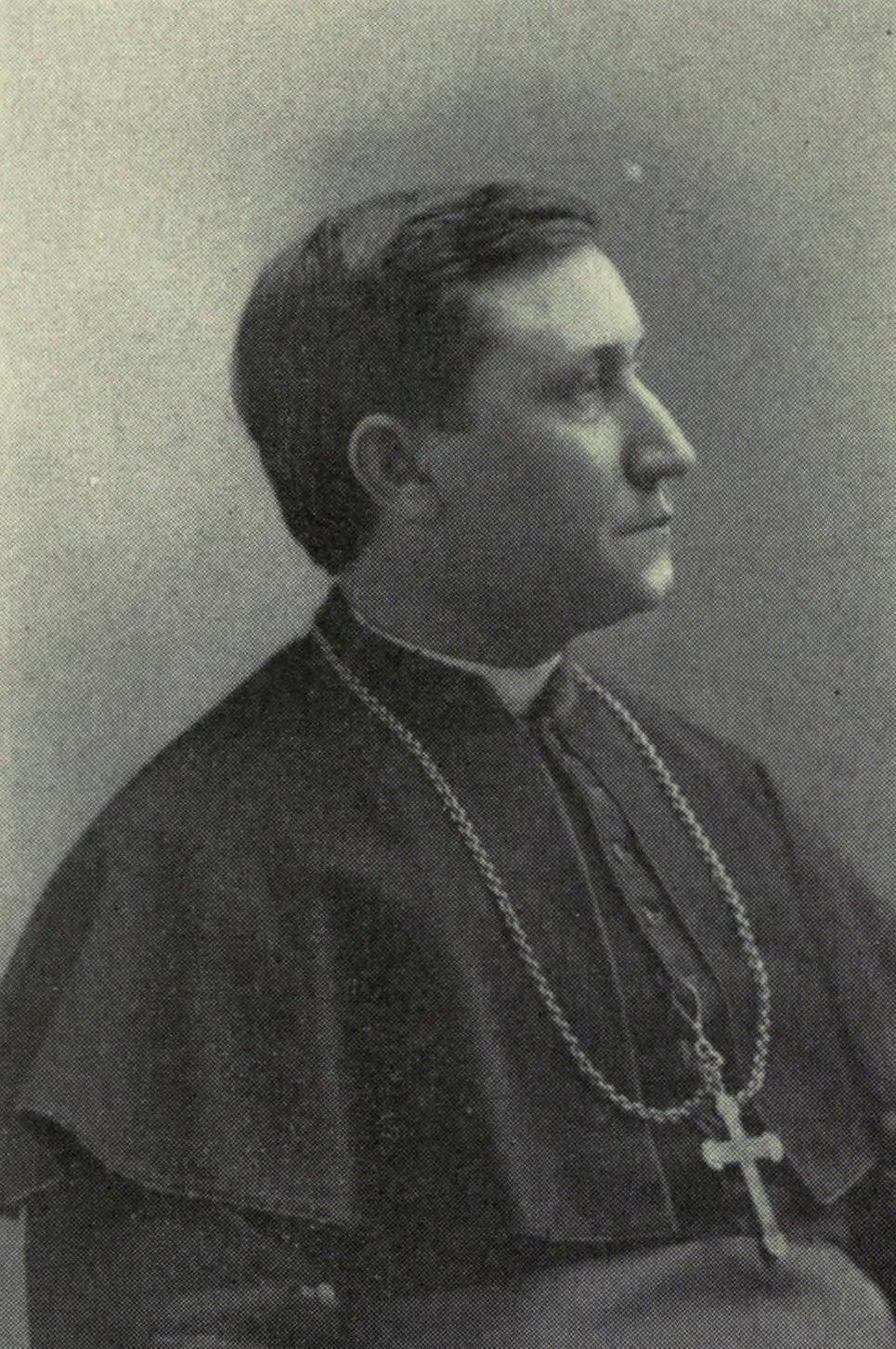
- See: Diocese of Manchester
- Successor: John Bernard Delany

Orders
- Ordination: June 3, 1871 by Bernard John McQuaid
- Consecration: June 11, 1884 by John Joseph Williams

Personal details
- Born: February 25, 1846 Castleisland, County Kerry, Ireland
- Died: December 13, 1903 (aged 57) Manchester, New Hampshire, U.S.
- Denomination: Roman Catholic
- Education: College of the Holy Cross (AB); St. Joseph's Seminary
- Motto: Ite ad Joseph (Go to Joseph)

Denis Mary Bradley (February 25, 1846 – December 13, 1903) was an Irish-born American prelate of the Roman Catholic Church. He served as the first bishop of the Diocese of Manchester in New Hampshire from 1884 until his death in 1903. Bradley was a co-founder of Saint Anselm College in Goffstown, New Hampshire.

== Biography ==
=== Early life ===
Denis Bradley was born on February 25, 1846, in Castleisland, County Kerry in Ireland. When Bradley was eight years old, his father died. His mother immigrated with the family to the United States, settling in Manchester, New Hampshire. Bradley attended Park Street Grammar School and other Catholic schools in Manchester.

In 1863, Bradley entered the College of the Holy Cross in Worcester, Massachusetts. According to a contemporary account, Bradley was an introspective and serious student. He graduated from Holy Cross in June 1867. In September 1867, Bradley enrolled at St. Joseph's Seminary in Troy, New York.

=== Priesthood ===
Bradley was ordained a priest in Troy by Bishop Bernard McQuaid for the Diocese of Portland in Maine on June 3, 1871. At that time, this diocese included both Maine and New Hampshire. After his ordination, Bradley was given a pastoral assignment to the Cathedral of the Immaculate Conception in Portland, Maine. He was eventually appointed as rector of the cathedral and chancellor of the diocese.

In 1879, Bradley took a six-month trip to Europe for health reasons. After returning to Maine, he was still not able to keep up with all of his job responsibilities. In June 1880, Bishop James Healy moved Bradley to the less demanding position of pastor of St. Joseph's Parish in Manchester, New Hampshire.

=== Bishop of Manchester ===
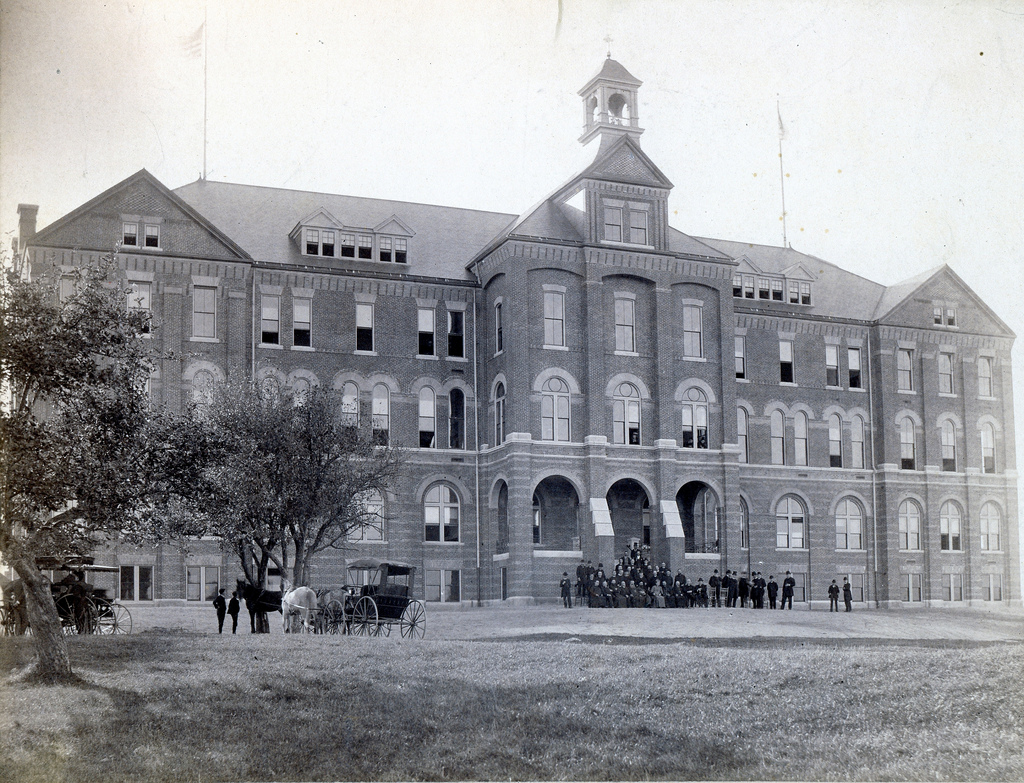
St Anselm College, Goffstown, New Hampshire (1893)

On April 18, 1884, Pope Leo XIII appointed Bradley as the first bishop of the new Diocese of Manchester. He was consecrated on June 11, 1884, by Archbishop John Williams at St. Joseph's Church in Manchester. Bradley was the first graduate of St. Joseph's Seminary to be appointed bishop.

In the rural parts of New Hampshire, there were many scattered Catholics, and Bradley's first efforts were directed towards providing for them. He held the first synod of the diocese on October 24, 1886.

At some point in the 1880s, Bradley contacted the Benedictine monks at Saint Mary's Abbey in Newark, New Jersey, about creating a Catholic college in New Hampshire. Saint Anselm College opened in Goffstown, New Hampshire in 1889.

=== Death and legacy ===
During a mass in early December 1903, Bradley collapsed at the altar. Denis Bradley died in Manchester of chronic gastritis on December 13, 1903, at age 57. Bradley House at Saint Anselm College was named after him.

== Other Sources ==
- Catholic News files (New York, December, 1903) at Catholic Directory (Milwaukee, WI: 1904)
- Reuss, Biog. Encyl. Of the Cath. Hierarchy (Milwaukee, WI: 1898)
- Gabriels, History of St. Joseph's Seminary, Troy (New York: 1906)
