= John Brady (bishop of Boston) =

American bishop (1842–1910)

Right Reverend John Brady
- Bishop of Alabanda; Auxiliary Bishop of Boston
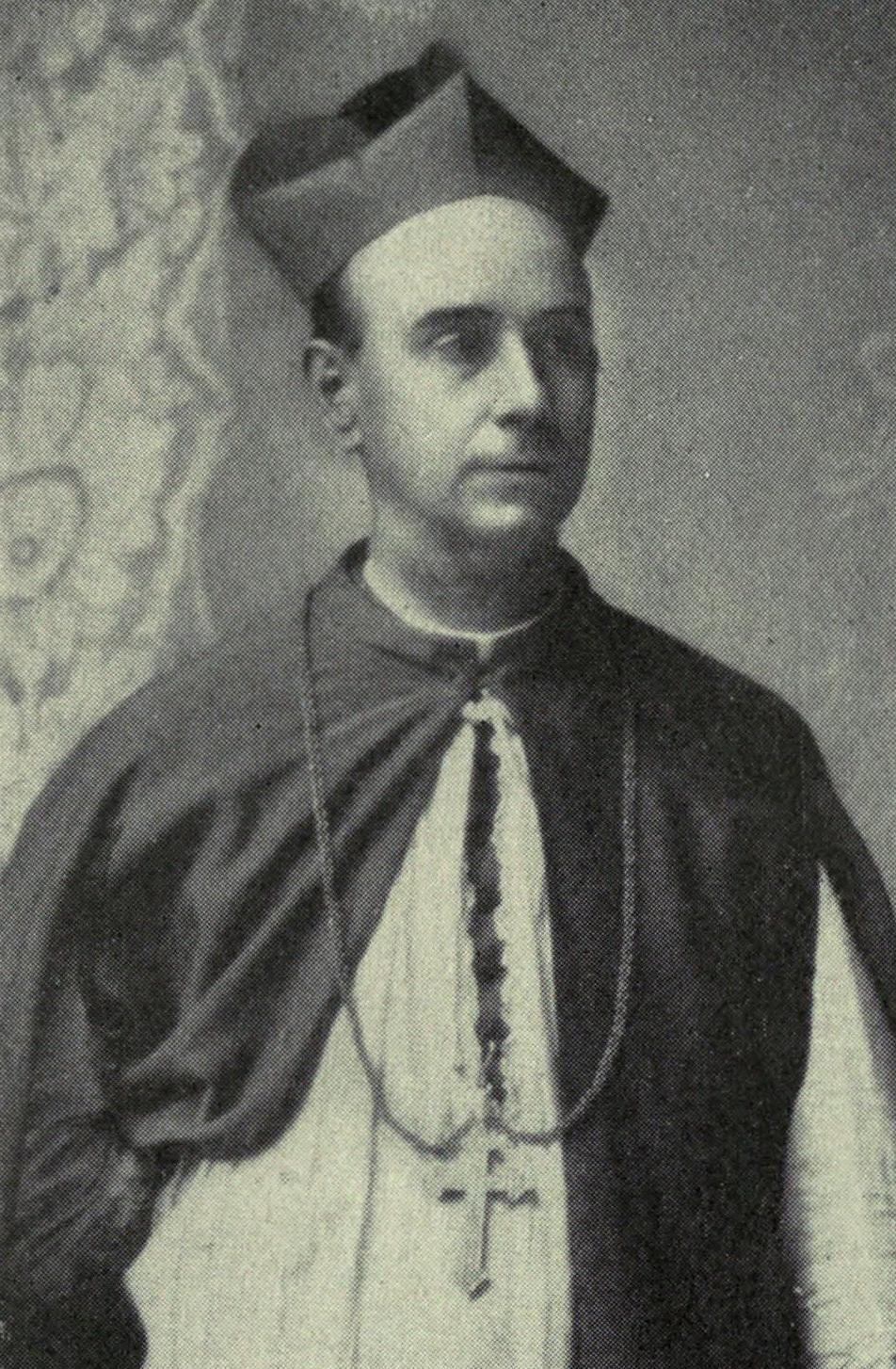
- Church: Catholic
- Archdiocese: Boston
- Appointed: 19 June 1891

Orders
- Ordination: 4 December 1864 by John Francis Whelan
- Consecration: 5 August 1891 by John Joseph Williams

Personal details
- Born: 11 February 1842 Kilnaleck, Ireland
- Died: 6 January 1910 (aged 67) Boston, Massachusetts, US
- Education: Missionary College of All Hallows

John Brady DD (February 11, 1842 – January 6, 1910) was an Irish-born prelate of the Roman Catholic Church who served as an auxiliary bishop of the Diocese of Boston in Massachusetts from 1891 to 1910.

== Early life ==
John Brady was born at Crosserlough, County Cavan, Ireland on April 11, 1842. He was educated at the local diocesan schools and then completed his theological course at the Missionary College of All Hallows in Dublin, which trained priests for English-speaking communities.

== Priesthood ==
Brady was ordained a priest for the Diocese of Boston in Dublin on December 4, 1864 by Bishop John Francis Whelan. After his ordination, the diocese assigned Brady as a curate in parishes in Boston and Newburyport, Massachusetts. In 1868, he was appointed pastor of a parish in Amesbury, Massachusetts.

== Auxiliary bishop of Boston ==
Pope Leo XIII appointed Brady as titular bishop of Alabanda and auxiliary bishop of what was now the Archdiocese of Boston on June 19, 1891. Brady was consecrated at the Cathedral of the Holy Cross in Boston on August 5, 1891 by Archbishop John Joseph Williams.

== Death ==
Brady died in Boston on January 6, 1910, after a short illness. His funeral mass was celebrated by Archbishop William O'Connell.
