= Saint John's Seminary (Massachusetts) =

Roman Catholic seminary in Brighton, Massachusetts, United States

St. John's Seminary
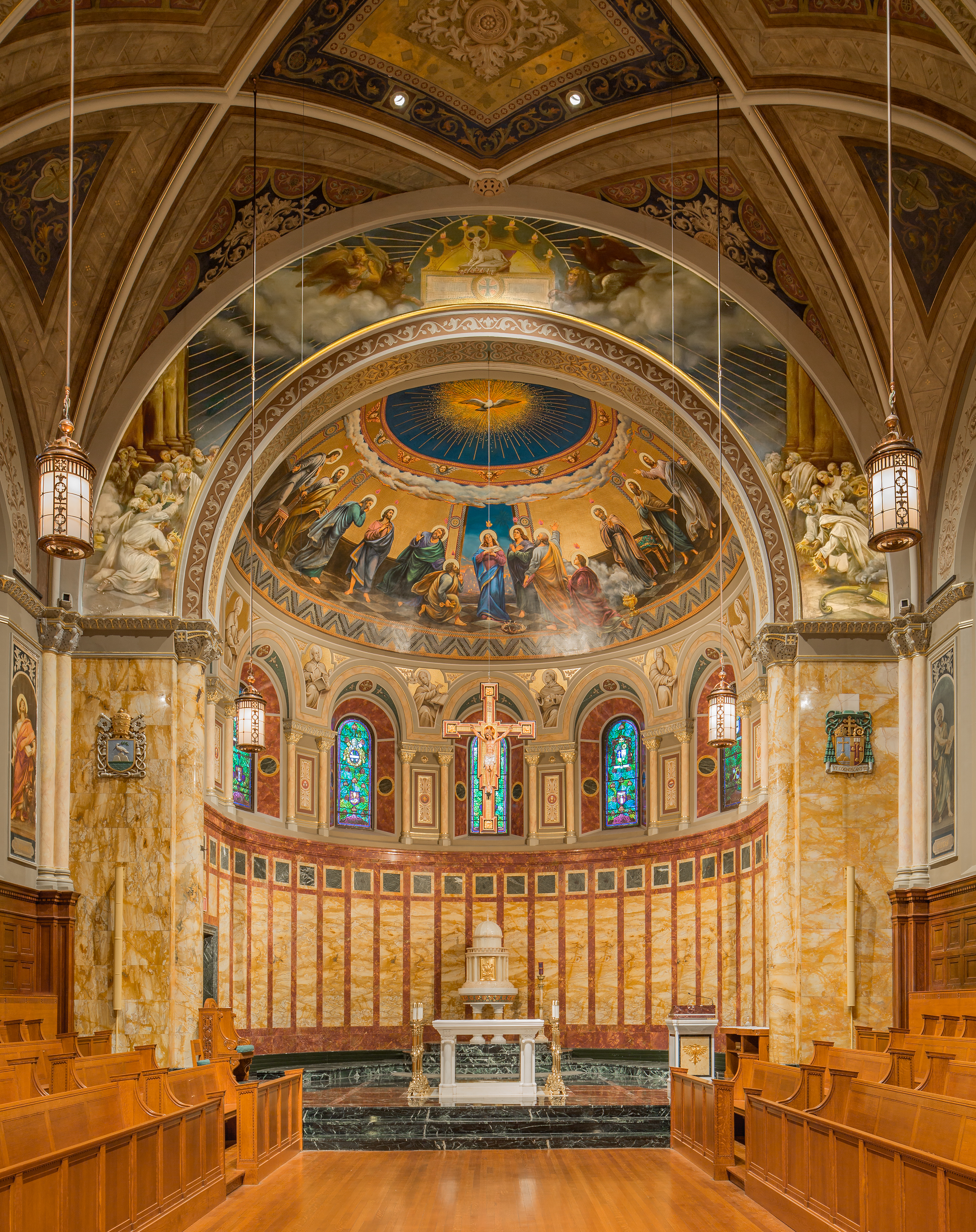
- Type: Private, Graduate
- Established: 1884
- Affiliations: Catholic Church
- Rector: The Most Reverend Robert P. Reed
- Dean: Paul Metilly
- Interim Vice Rector: Rev. Stanislaus Achu
- Faculty: seminary: 9 F/T, 12 P/T lay programs: 19
- Students: 139 seminarians, approx. 60 laity
- Location: Brighton, Massachusetts, United States; 42°20′38.45″N 71°9′47.18″W
- Campus: Urban
- Website: www.sjs.edu

St. John's Hall viewed from Lake Street

Saint John's Seminary, located in the Brighton neighborhood of Boston, Massachusetts, is a Catholic major seminary sponsored by the Roman Catholic Archdiocese of Boston. The current rector is The Most Reverend Robert P. Reed.

== History ==
In 1864, wealthy Boston merchant James Stanworth acquired a farm on a hill in Brighton known as the Hildreth estate. Stanworth suffered losses in the Panic of 1873 and his heirs found he owed substantial debts. Archbishop John Joseph Williams purchased the Hildreth estate and construction of the Boston Ecclesiastical Seminary began in 1881 and was completed in 1884. In 1883, the Commonwealth of Massachusetts granted a Charter to the Seminary to grant degrees in philosophy and divinity. The Archbishop entrusted the seminary to his former teachers, the Sulpicians. Students began classes on September 22, 1884. The First rector was John Baptist Hogan.

The Seminary was incorporated under the laws of Massachusetts in 1892. In 1911, the Sulpicians withdrew from the seminary at the request of Archbishop William Henry O'Connell, who preferred a diocesan faculty more familiar with local conditions.

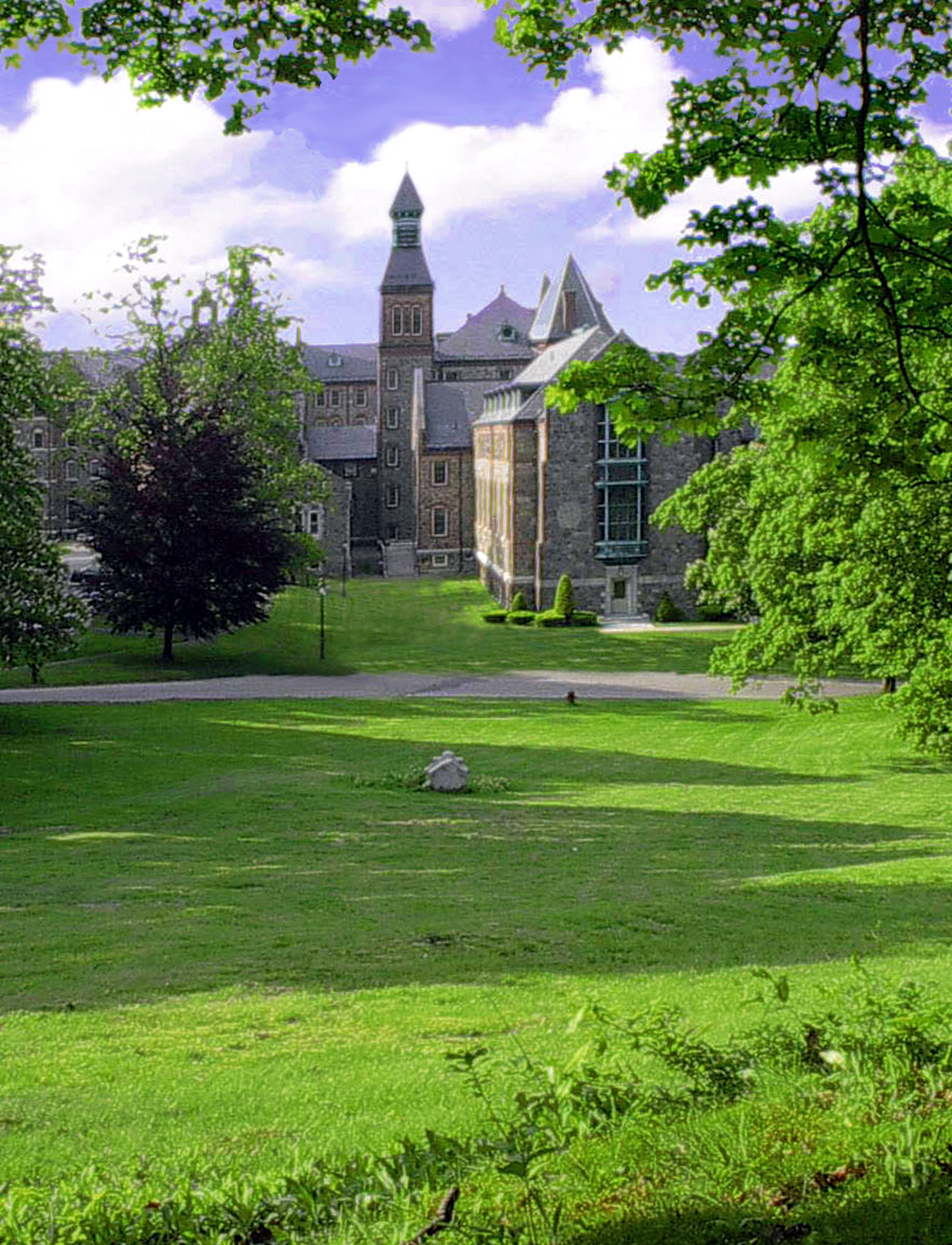
Grounds surrounding seminary

Saint John's Seminary adopted its present name in 1941.

=== Merger with Cardinal O'Connell Seminary ===
Cardinal O'Connell Seminary, the archdiocesan minor seminary for high school students in Jamaica Plain, Massachusetts, was merged with Saint John's Seminary in 1968. In 1970 its programs were relocated to a Foster Street site in Saint Clement's Hall.

=== Crisis and recovery after 2000 child sexual abuse scandal ===
St. John's College Seminary, the division for students with a high school diploma but without an undergraduate degree, closed in 2002.

In the wake of the Catholic Archdiocese of Boston sex abuse scandal enrollment declined from a peak of 86 students in the academic year 2001–02 to 34 for 2005–06. Two years later, the seminary recovered to a student population of 63.

During the 2000s, nearly all the Seminary's land and buildings were sold to Boston College (BC), the neighboring Jesuit-run college. In 2001, Boston College leased St. Clement's Hall, formerly the site of the Seminary's undergraduate division, and it bought the property in June 2004. In May 2007, the Archdiocese sold the Seminary's open land, its library building and several other structures. Rector John Farren, OP resigned and protested the 2007 sale in a letter to Cardinal O'Malley.

After the land sales, the campus of the Seminary consists only of Saint John's Hall.

=== Sexual misconduct scandal and resignations ===
In August 2018, the rector of Saint John's was placed on administrative leave after two former seminarians claimed on social media that sexual misconduct occurred at the school. The new allegations forced a new investigation by Archdiocese of Boston against Saint John's. On November 22, 2019, the Archdiocese of Boston and former U.S. Attorney Donald Stern concluded that there was some accuracy to the 2018 allegations, such as the expulsion of two students in 2014 for inappropriate sexual conduct, an incident from 2015 where six students received anonymous sexual text messages, and excessive drinking at a 2015 bachelor party which was held on campus. Despite also criticizing Saint John's for having poor leadership, poor financial oversight, and inadequate human formation of seminarians, the joint investigation also concluded that the sexual misconduct which occurred at the seminary was not unlawful. In December 2019, Stephen Salocks, who was named interim rector when the investigation started, replaced Msgr. James Moroney as the Rector of Saint John's Seminary. In addition to promoting Salocks, Boston Archbishop Cardinal Sean Patrick O'Malley also named Fr. Thomas Macdonald as the new Vice Rector.

=== Enrollment statistics ===
| Academic year | Enrollment | Notes |
|---|---|---|
| 1884 | 10 | |
| 1907 | 86 | |
| 1942 | 241 | |
| 1960 | 418 | |
| 2001–2002 | 86 | |
| 2004–2005 | 30 | This marked the fewest number in more than a century. |
| 2005–2006 | 23 | |
| 2007–2008 | 63 | |
| 2008–2009 | 87 | |
| 2009–2010 | 91 | 81 diocesan seminarians and 10 religious |
| 2011–2012 | 108 | |
| 2012–2013 | 120 | The most in more than 20 years. |
| 2015–2016 | 114 | 78 diocesan seminarians and 36 religious |
| 2016–2017 | 139 | 100 diocesan seminarians and 39 religious |

== Participating dioceses ==
Most students are from dioceses in New England: in Massachusetts, from the Archdiocese of Boston and the Dioceses of Fall River, Springfield, and Worcester; in Connecticut, from the Archdiocese of Hartford; and also from the dioceses of Burlington, Vermont, Manchester, New Hampshire, and Providence, Rhode Island.

In the academic year of 2014–2015, Saint John's began receiving seminarians from the Diocese of Rochester, New York. That same year, the Diocese of Portland, which encompasses all of Maine, resumed sending seminarians. Saint John's also serves as the seminary for a few men from dioceses outside the U.S.

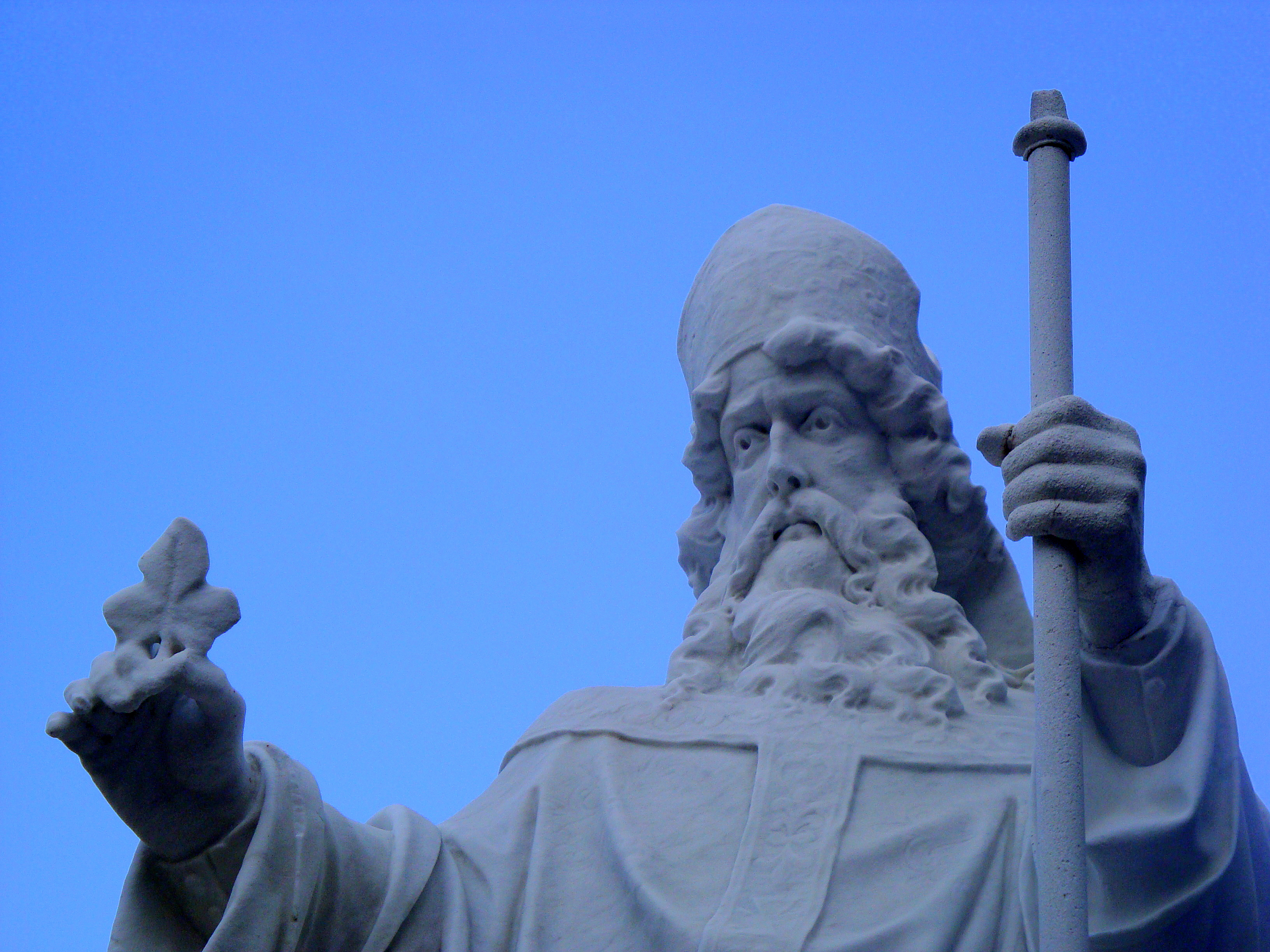
Statue of St. Patrick, patron of the Archdiocese of Boston

College-level seminary candidates for the Archdiocese of Boston reside at Our Lady of Providence Seminary College in Providence, Rhode Island and various other institutions.

== Academics ==
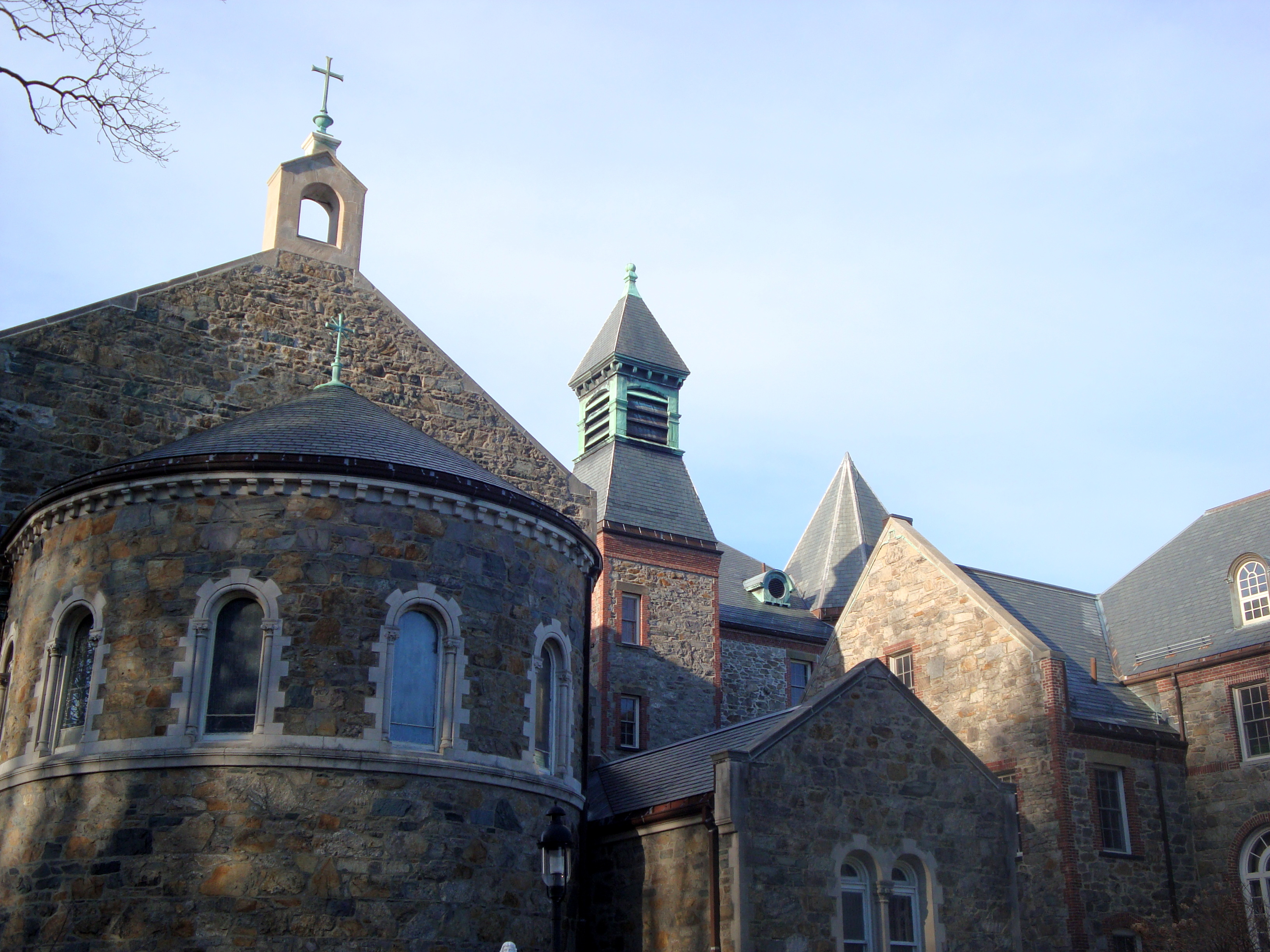
St. John's Seminary exterior

=== Seminary programs ===
As a major seminary, an institution providing formation for the Catholic priesthood, Saint John's offers a four-year program leading to the Master of Divinity degree. There is also a program leading to the Master of Arts in Theology.

In addition, "Saint John's Seminary offers a two-year program of initial formation for those candidates who are college graduates and have no prior experience of formal preparation for the sacrament of Holy Orders." Those who complete the Pre-Theology Program may qualify to receive a Bachelor of Philosophy (B.Phil.).

=== Programs for lay students ===
The Seminary's Theological Institute for the New Evangelization offers programs for lay people wishing to work in Roman Catholic ministry, leading to the degrees Master of Theological Studies for the New Evangelization, and Master of Arts in Ministry (MAM). These programs are based at a separate campus in accordance with norms of the Holy See. The MAM division of TINE also offers non-credit catechist training programs in evangelization and apologetics.

=== Accreditation ===
The Seminary is accredited by the Association of Theological Schools and by the New England Commission of Higher Education.

== Athletics ==
Seminarians partake in sports including basketball, football, golf, softball, and soccer, including intramural games with BC club teams. Twice a year St. John's Seminary competes in softball games against Pope St. John XXIII National Seminary (Weston, MA) and Our Lady of Providence College Seminary (Providence, RI). With access to the Margot Connell Recreation Center at Boston College, seminarians contend in intramural basketball and soccer leagues against Boston College students.

== Daily life ==
The daily schedule includes classes and services in chapel. Seminarians have off-campus pastoral assignments at least once per week. Most seminarians also have a "house job", such as sacristan or bookstore manager. Each seminarian meets with his spiritual director twice monthly.

== Notable alumni ==
- Robert Joseph Banks, bishop of Green Bay 1985–2003
- Hugh F. Blunt (1877–1957), priest and poet
- George William Coleman, bishop of Fall River since 2003
- Daniel Anthony Cronin, archbishop of Hartford 1992–2003
- Richard Cushing, archbishop of Boston 1944–1970
- John Michael D'Arcy, bishop of Fort Wayne-South Bend 1985–2009
- Jonathan DeFelice, OSB, president of Saint Anselm College
- Daniel Francis Desmond, bishop of Alexandria (Louisiana) 1933–1945
- George Albert Guertin, bishop of Manchester 1907–1931
- Daniel Anthony Hart, bishop of Norwich 1995–2003
- William A. Hickey, bishop of Providence 1921–1933
- Alfred Clifton Hughes, bishop of Baton Rouge 1993–2002 and archbishop of New Orleans 2002–2009
- Paul K. Hurley, Major General, 24th Chief of Chaplains US Army
- Frederick Kriekenbeek, exorcist and priest in Cebu
- Richard Lennon, bishop of Cleveland since 2006
- Joseph Francis Maguire, bishop of Springfield 1977–1991
- Richard Joseph Malone, bishop of Portland 2004–2012 and bishop of Buffalo 2012–2019
- John Brendan McCormack, bishop of Manchester 1998–2010
- John P. McDonough, Chief of Chaplains of the U.S. Air Force
- Henry J. Meade, Chief of Chaplains of the U.S. Air Force
- Roger Morin, bishop of Biloxi since 2009
- John Bertram Peterson, professor, bishop of Manchester 1932–1944
- Joseph John Rice, bishop of Burlington, 1910–1938
- Nicholas Samra, Melkite Greek Catholic bishop of Newton, appointed 2011
- William Laurence Sullivan (1872–1935), Unitarian minister
- Henry A. Walsh, member of the first class from St. John's
- James Anthony Walsh (1867–1936), co-founder of the Maryknoll Fathers and Brothers
- John Joseph Wright, professor, first bishop of Worcester 1950–1959, bishop of Pittsburgh 1959–1969, cardinal

== Notable faculty ==
- Christopher J. Coyne, Bishop of Burlington, VT
- James Patrick Moroney, rector, professor of liturgy and executive secretary of the Vox Clara commission
- Louis Sebastian Walsh, Bishop of Portland (Maine), 1906–1924
- Michael C. Barber, S.J., Bishop of Oakland, California, director emeritus-Spiritual Formation

== Rectors ==
Under Sulpician administration:

- 1884–89: John Baptist Hogan, S.S.
- 1889–94: Charles B. Rex
- 1894–01: John Baptist Hogan, S.S.
- 1901–06: Daniel E. Maher, S.S.
- 1906–11: Francis P. Havey

Under archdiocesan administration:

- 1911–26: John Bertram Peterson
- 1926–33: Charles A. Finn
- 1933–38: Joseph C. Walsh
- 1938–50: Edward G. Murray
- 1950–58: Thomas J. Riley
- 1958–65: Matthew J. Stapleton
- 1966–66: Lawrence J. Riley
- 1966–71: John A. Broderick
- 1972–81: Robert Joseph Banks
- 1981–86: Alfred Clifton Hughes
- 1986–91: Thomas J. Daly
- 1991–99: Timothy J. Moran
- 1999–2002: Richard G. Lennon
- 2002–07: John A. Farren, OP
- 2007–12: Arthur L. Kennedy
- 2012–18: James P. Moroney
  - 2018–2019: Stephen E. Salocks (Interim)
- 2019–Present: Stephen E. Salocks
