= Sexual abuse scandal in the Roman Catholic Diocese of Springfield in Massachusetts =

- Part of Catholic Church sex abuse cases in the United States
- Coat of arms of the Diocese of Springfield in Massachusetts
- Date: Alleged abuses from mid-20th century; investigations and litigation from the 1990s onward
- Location: Diocese of Springfield in Massachusetts, United States
- Cause: Sexual abuse by clergy; failures in diocesan oversight and reporting
- Participants: Clergy of the Diocese of Springfield; victims and survivors; diocesan leadership; civil authorities
- Outcome: Criminal investigations; civil lawsuits; financial settlements; implementation of safeguarding policies

The sexual abuse scandal in Springfield in Massachusetts diocese is a significant episode in the series of Catholic sex abuse cases in the United States.

== Edward Paquette affair ==
Although he established the Diocesan Misconduct Commission in response to sexual abuse among the clergy, bishop John Aloysius Marshall accepted Rev. Edward Paquette despite the repeated allegations of child molestation against him. Marshall even said that he was "determined to take the risk of leaving [Paquette] in his present assignment" despite "the demands of...irate parents that 'something be done about this.'"

== Richard R. Lavigne affair ==
Richard R. Lavigne was a priest of the Roman Catholic Diocese of Springfield in Massachusetts. Lavigne has been at the center of the Priest Abuse Scandal in the Diocese of Springfield in Massachusetts with about 40 claims of sexual abuse of minors placed against him. The Diocese has paid out large cash settlements to numerous people purported to have been molested by Lavigne. He was removed from ministry by Bishop John A. Marshall in 1991.

== Thomas Ludger Dupré affair ==
After thirteen years as Bishop, Thomas Ludger Dupré resigned due to unspecified health reasons on February 11, 2004. His resignation came one day after The Springfield Republican confronted him with accusations of sexual abuse from two men who had known Dupré when he was a parish priest and they were altar boys. Dupre was also accused by local clergy of covering up abuse charges against other priests, including Richard R. Lavigne.

On September 24, 2004, bishop Dupré was indicted by a Hampden County grand jury on two counts of child molestation. He thus became the first Catholic bishop ever to be indicted of sexual abuse. However, the Springfield district attorney's office was forced to drop the charges against Dupré because the statute of limitations had run out. He then entered St. Luke Institute, a private Catholic psychiatric hospital in Silver Spring, Maryland. In December 2016, Dupré died at the facility.
