= Timothy A. McDonnell =

American Roman Catholic prelate (1937–2026)

His Excellency, The Most Reverend Timothy Anthony McDonnell
- Bishop Emeritus of Springfield in Massachusetts
- Archdiocese: Boston
- Diocese: Springfield in Massachusetts
- Appointed: March 9, 2004
- Installed: April 1, 2004
- Retired: June 19, 2014
- Predecessor: Thomas Ludger Dupré
- Successor: Mitchell T. Rozanski
- Previous posts: Auxiliary Bishop of New York and Titular Bishop of Semina (2001–2004)

Orders
- Ordination: June 1, 1963 by Francis Spellman
- Consecration: December 12, 2001 by Edward Egan, Henry J. Mansell, and Robert Anthony Brucato

Personal details
- Born: December 23, 1937 New York City, U.S.
- Died: March 4, 2026 (aged 88) Springfield, Massachusetts, U.S.
- Denomination: Roman Catholic Church
- Parents: John J. McDonnell; Margaret Looney McDonnell
- Education: Saint John's Seminary; Iona College
- Motto: Love God and love neighbor

Styles of Timothy Anthony McDonnell
- Reference style: His Excellency; The Most Reverend
- Spoken style: Your Excellency
- Religious style: Bishop

Timothy Anthony McDonnell (December 23, 1937 – March 4, 2026) was an American prelate of the Roman Catholic Church. He served as bishop of the Diocese of Springfield in Massachusetts from 2004 to 2014 and as an auxiliary bishop of the Archdiocese of New York from 2001 to 2004.

== Biography ==
=== Early life and education ===
Timothy McDonnell was born on December 23, 1937, in New York City to John J. and Margaret (née Looney) McDonnell, both from County Cork, Ireland. The eldest of two children, he had a younger brother, John McDonnell, who was a member of the Marist Brothers and served as vice-provincial of the United States Province. Their father was a dockworker for Standard Oil Corporation in Brooklyn and later owned a gas station in the Bronx.

He attended parochial schools in the Bronx and was inspired by his great-uncle to pursue a vocation to the priesthood. He then studied at Cathedral College in Queens, New York, and St. Joseph's Seminary in Yonkers, New York, where he obtained a Bachelor of Philosophy degree in 1959.

=== Ordination and ministry ===
On June 1, 1963, McDonnell was ordained a priest for the Archdiocese of New York by Cardinal Francis Spellman at St. Patrick's Cathedral in Manhattan.

After his ordination, McDonnell served as an associate pastor at Our Lady of Perpetual Help Parish in Ardsley, New York, and as a teacher at Maria Regina High School in Hartsdale, New York until 1969. McDonnell earned a Master of Education in pastoral counseling degree from Iona College in New Rochelle, New York, in 1970.

From 1970 to 1977, McDonnell was assistant director of the archdiocesan Office for Christian and Family Development, while also serving as a chaplain at Cardinal McCloskey School and Home for Children in White Plains, New York. He was then named director of the Society for the Propagation of the Faith in 1977, vice-chancellor for the archdiocese in 1980, and monsignor by the Vatican in 1983.

From 1984 to 1990, McDonnell served as pastor of Holy Trinity Parish in Manhattan. He briefly served as episcopal vicar of the West Manhattan area (1989–1990). In 1990, he became chief operating officer of the archdiocesan chapter of Catholic Charities. He was also assigned to help run Covenant House in Manhattan following the resignation of its president, Reverend Bruce Ritter.

In 1993, McDonnell became pastor of St. John and St. Mary Parish in Chappaqua, New York, serving there until 2002. While in Chappaqua, he oversaw a major renovation construction project at the church.

=== Auxiliary Bishop of New York ===
On October 30, 2001, Pope John Paul II appointed McDonnell as auxiliary bishop of New York and titular bishop of Semina. He was consecrated on December 12, 2001, by Cardinal Edward Egan, with Bishops Henry J. Mansell and Robert Brucato serving as co-consecrators, at St. Patrick's Cathedral in Manhattan. McDonnell selected as his episcopal motto: "Love God and Love Neighbor."

In addition to his duties as an auxiliary bishop, McDonnell served as vicar general of the archdiocese from 2002 to 2004. In May 2003, McDonnell reported to the archdiocesan priests council on the reorganization and possible consolidation of parishes within the archdiocese.

=== Bishop of Springfield in Massachusetts ===
On March 9, 2004, John Paul II named McDonnell as the eighth bishop of the Diocese of Springfield in Massachusetts. He was installed on April 1, 2004, at St. Michael's Cathedral in Springfield. McDonnell presided over a number of historic church closings and sales in the diocese.

In May 2004, McDonnell liquidated a fund designed to help priests accused of sexual misconduct. The fund had been set up by then Bishop Thomas Dupré in late 2003. The existence of the fund had provoked conflict between McDonnell and one of his parish priests, James Scahill. Scahill had been withholding part of the parish collection to protest continued diocese support of Reverend Richard Lavigne, who had been convicted of child molestation in 1992. During a heated exchange at a council meeting in May 2004, McDonnell accused Scahill of calling him a "Vatican lackey". When Scahill denied it, McDonnell said that he was worse than Lavigne and dismissed him from the meeting.

A few days after his installation, McDonnell had met with a mediator about settling several sexual abuse lawsuits against the diocese. In July 2004, the diocese announced a $7 million settlement with 46 victims of child sexual abuse, many of whom had been molested by Levigne. By September, 2004, McDonnell and Scahill had reconciled their differences and performed mass together at Scahill's church. During the service, McDonnell apologized to Scahill for his remarks from the May 2004 council meeting.

In 2006, McDonnell signed a letter with the other Catholic bishops of Massachusetts urging support for a proposed amendment to the Massachusetts Constitution to ban same sex marriage.

=== Retirement and death ===
On June 19, 2014, Pope Francis accepted McDonnell's letter of resignation as bishop of Springfield in Massachusetts. McDonnell died on March 4, 2026, at the age of 88, after a brief battle with cancer.

== See also ==
- Catholic Church hierarchy
- Catholic Church in the United States
- Historical list of the Catholic bishops of the United States
- List of Catholic bishops of the United States
- Lists of patriarchs, archbishops, and bishops

== Episcopal succession ==
Catholic Church titles
Preceded by –	Bishop Emeritus of Springfield in Massachusetts; 2014–2026	Succeeded by –
Preceded by Thomas Ludger Dupré	Bishop of Springfield in Massachusetts; 2004–2014	Succeeded by Mitchell T. Rozanski
Preceded by Thomas Khamphan	Titular Bishop of Semina; 2001–2004	Succeeded by Ján Orosch
Preceded by –	Auxiliary Bishop of New York; 2001–2004	Succeeded by –
