= Murder of Danny Croteau =

1972 murder of a child in Chicopee, Massachusetts, U.S.

Coordinates: 42°9′29″N 72°32′53″W

Danny Croteau
- The last photo taken of Croteau, from his 1972 school yearbook
- Born: Daniel Thomas Croteau; November 12, 1958; Springfield, Massachusetts, U.S.
- Died: April 14, 1972 (aged 13); Chicopee, Massachusetts, U.S.
- Cause of death: Murdered with a rock; fractures to the skull and brain lacerations
- Resting place: Hillcrest Park Cemetery
- Parents: Carl E. Croteau; Bernice "Bunny" Croteau

On April 15, 1972, Daniel Thomas Croteau, a 13-year-old Roman Catholic altar boy from Springfield, Massachusetts, was found murdered, floating in the Chicopee River, after disappearing the previous evening.

Croteau's former priest, Richard Lavigne, was long considered the prime suspect in the case; however, he died in May 2021, having never stood trial. According to Hampden County D. A. Anthony Gulluni, his office had begun preparing an arrest warrant hours before his death, based on admissions Lavigne had recently given investigators.

Lavigne was known to have sexually abused at least 63 other children and was believed by authorities to have molested Croteau between 1967 and 1972, eventually murdering him to avoid apprehension.

== Background ==
=== Biography ===
Danny Croteau was born on November 12, 1958, in Springfield, Massachusetts, the fifth of seven children to Carl (1931–2010) and Bernice "Bunny" Croteau (née Everett; 1936–2016). He was named after Catholic actor and philanthropist Danny Thomas. Croteau enjoyed fishing and ice hockey. He was described by his father as a mischievous but "good kid" who had a strong sense of humor and enjoyed helping others. He and his family attended St. Catherine of Siena Church in Sixteen Acres.

=== Relationship to Lavigne ===
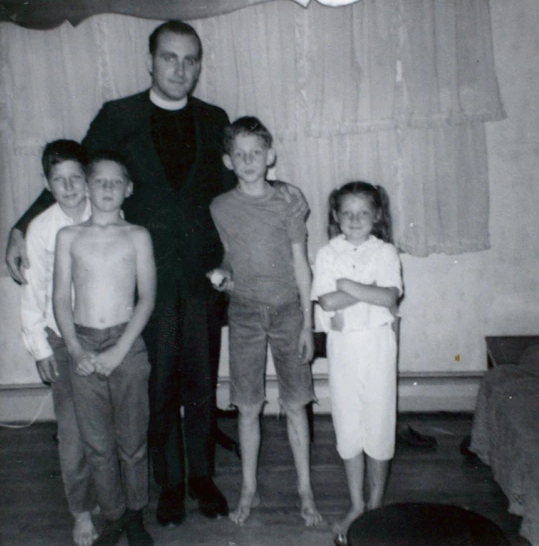
Lavigne pictured with the youngest Croteau children (Danny is second to the left) in 1968

Richard Roger Lavigne (1941–2021) first met the Croteaus in 1967, when he was a newly ordained priest assigned to St. Catherine. He quickly developed a close relationship with the family and would visit their home for coffee and dinners. He also, on occasion, babysat Danny and his siblings and would bring them to places such as the pool at St. Catherine or Lavigne's father's shoe store. As Carl worked several jobs to feed their seven children, Lavigne would buy the family gifts and deliver them food from the freezer of his parish's rectory, telling them, "You need this more than we do."

In 1968, Lavigne was transferred to St. Mary's Parish in Springfield but remained close to the Croteaus. During this time, the children would occasionally spend nights at St. Mary's rectory with Lavigne. Carl Croteau later stated that he "never liked that sleeping over the rectory stuff" but nonetheless allowed it, as his children never complained, and Lavigne was a friendly and charitable figure in their life.

== Murder ==
On Friday, April 14, 1972, Croteau returned home from school. He ate his favorite food—a bowl of Cheerios—spoke to his parents about legal fishing season beginning the next day, and left to play in a kickball game in a neighbor's backyard. After the game ended, he was last seen walking in the neighborhood accompanying a paperboy.

When Croteau did not return home after dusk, his mother called everyone who might have known his whereabouts, including Lavigne at the rectory, who claimed that he had not seen him. Croteau's father checked local ponds in case he had gone fishing a day early, to no avail. As panic set in, his mother called the police, who told her that it was too soon to file a missing person's report.

After a sleepless night, Croteau's parents were notified of Danny's death at their home the following morning. A few hours earlier, Chicopee patrolman Burl Howard spotted Croteau floating face-down in the Chicopee River under a bridge near the Chicopee–Springfield border. (Note: Some reports claim that he was discovered by a fisherman.) Carl Croteau was asked to come to police headquarters to give a statement. Carl requested that they pick up Lavigne so he could accompany them in the investigation, to which police agreed. After questioning, Lavigne was allowed to identify Danny's body in place of Carl. Lavigne recommended that Danny's casket be closed during the funeral.

It was determined during his autopsy that Croteau had died of a fractured skull and brain lacerations after being repeatedly struck in the face and head with a blunt object, possibly a rock. (Note: Two days after Croteau's murder, Lavigne asked police, "If a stone was used and thrown in the river, would blood still be on it?") He also had a blood alcohol level of 0.18% (for comparison, the legal limit for driving is 0.08%) and both his stomach and pockets were full of chewing gum. (Note: Lavigne was known to frequently give children chewing gum to "loosen [their] inhibitions".) The autopsy did not show evidence of sexual abuse.

Croteau's funeral was held on April 18. Lavigne visited the family's home after, which was the last time he would do so. Lavigne called Danny's father two weeks later to say that it would be best if he was not around them anymore; Carl stated that he and his wife "didn't know what [Lavigne] was talking about". Ten days later, State Police Lieutenant James Fitzgibbons informed the Croteaus that Lavigne was the prime suspect in Danny's murder. Carl Croteau noted that Lavigne made no attempt to tell the family that he was not responsible.

Lavigne was given a polygraph in 1972, which only indicated that he was a closeted homosexual. He was then cleared of suspicion. One alternative suspect was considered in the case; however, they were not named publicly and were later absolved.

== Richard R. Lavigne ==
=== Background ===
Lavigne was regarded as the "cool" priest of his parish—"[fancying] himself as the Bobby Kennedy of priests", as one parishioner put it. He held countercultural beliefs growing in popularity at the time, such as opposition to the Vietnam War and police brutality, which caused tensions within the community at St. Catherine. He also allowed children to drink leftover sacramental wine and look through Playboy magazines he kept under the seats of his convertible. Despite his popular reputation among children, he was also known to have a violent temper.

=== History of sex crimes ===
As a teenager in the 1950s, Lavigne was fired from his job at the Chicopee Parks and Recreation Department after he was accused of fondling an 8-year-old boy.

In 1991, Lavigne was charged with rape, sexual assault, and battery for acts he committed against three boys in the 1980s. He pleaded guilty the following year and was required to attend psychiatric treatment and to register as a sex offender. He was later defrocked by the Holy See following public pressure in 2003. Between 1994 and 2004, the Diocese of Springfield paid out $9.1 million to 63 of Lavigne's known victims. In 2003, he was confronted at his mother's home by Boston Globe reporter Kevin Cullen in regard to Croteau. Lavigne smirked and told Cullen, "My silence has been my salvation."

In a 1993 statement to police, a childhood friend of Croteau recalled that in 1968 he had teased Croteau to reveal a secret about Lavigne, which Croteau seemed willing to do. This friend was unaware of what the secret was until he himself was molested by Lavigne later that night. Another friend of Croteau recalled that during a camping trip to Goshen in 1968, Lavigne and several boys were teasing Croteau, to which he threatened Lavigne: "I'll tell! ... I'll tell!" Lavigne then visibly changed his temperament and asked the boys to stop.

Three other Croteau children would later come forward claiming to have been molested by Lavigne. They also shared anecdotes of Danny's relationship with Lavigne, such as him returning home once "sick to his stomach from drinking alcohol" and crying when being picked up from hockey to spend the day with Lavigne.

The Bishop of Springfield Thomas Dupré, who himself had been indicted on child molestation charges, was accused by local clergy of covering up decades of crimes committed by several priests, including Lavigne.

=== 1991–1995: First re-examination of the case ===
After the public disclosure of his sex crimes in 1991, Lavigne was again suspected of murdering Croteau. As tire tracks at the crime scene were washed away in 1972 before they could be cast, only one piece of evidence remained—a straw found nearby. DNA evidence on it didn't match Lavigne, and prosecution against him was dropped in October 1995.

=== 2020–2021: Second re-examination of the case ===
In March 2020, Hampden County D. A. Anthony Gulluni created the "Unresolved Cases Unit", assigning investigators to re-examine old murders, including Croteau's. In April and May 2021, a sickly Lavigne was interviewed by police in his hospital bed on five separate occasions, totaling 11 hours.

According to his own statements, Lavigne led Croteau to the riverbank on the day of his disappearance before bludgeoning him with a rock and tossing it into the river. He then returned to find Croteau in the water, floating face-down. He stated: "I just remember being heartbroken when I saw his body going down the river, knowing I was responsible for giving him a good shove." He told the investigator that he did it "for the same reason you probably push your own son". Despite appearing remorseful, he was wary and did not explicitly confess to Croteau's murder, and he belittled him by calling him a "dumb" and "strange" child.

According to Gulluni, extensive circumstantial evidence had linked Lavigne to the murder, such as a letter he is believed to have written to himself in 2004 about "terrible compulsions" and "unbearable" torment, including details consistent with the crime:

Then you met a boy along the Chicopee River who felt no shame, who felt no guilt, who was not nauseated but rather reveled in such compulsions. Here you were beyond the brink of control seeking your only solace in the shame of others and instead it was shoved back in your face all the more intensely. What human being would not have been driven over the brink in your position?

By mid-May 2021, Gulluni believed enough evidence had been gathered for a conviction; however, Lavigne died of respiratory failure brought on by COVID-19 at Baystate Franklin Medical Center in Greenfield on the day his arrest warrant was being prepared. On May 24, Gulluni held a press conference in which he stated confidently that Lavigne was the perpetrator, and the case was officially closed.

== See also ==
- List of homicides in Massachusetts
- List of murdered American children

== Cited works ==
- Fleming, E. J. (2018). Death of an Altar Boy: The Unsolved Murder of Danny Croteau and the Culture of Abuse in the Catholic Church. Jefferson, North Carolina: Exposit. ISBN 1-4766-7345-4.
