= Thomas Michael O'Leary =

American prelate

His Excellency, The Most Reverend Thomas Michael O'Leary
- Bishop of Springfield in Massachusetts
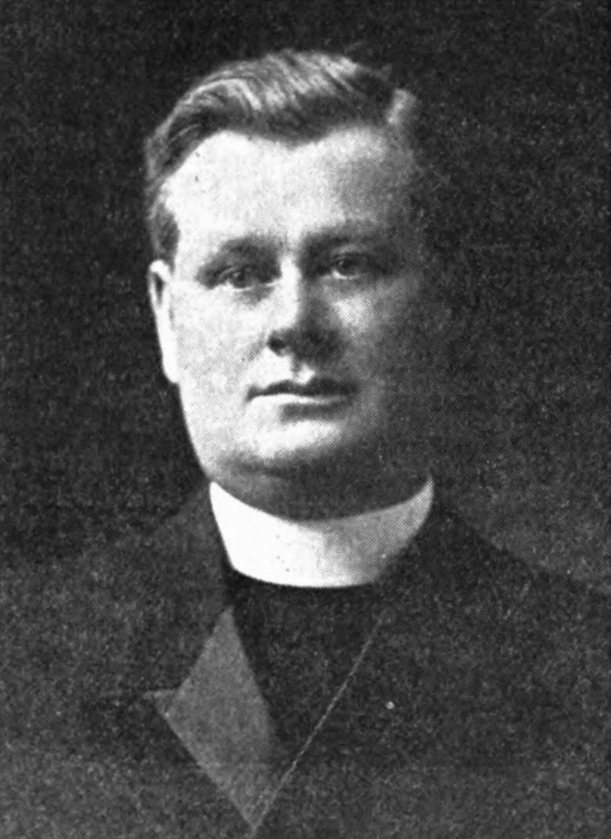
- See: Diocese of Springfield in Massachusetts
- In office: September 8, 1921 to October 10, 1949
- Predecessor: Thomas Daniel Beaven
- Successor: Christopher Joseph Weldon

Orders
- Ordination: December 18, 1897 by Maxime Decelles
- Consecration: September 8, 1921 by Arthur Alfred Sinnott

Personal details
- Born: August 16, 1875 Dover, New Hampshire, US
- Died: October 10, 1949 (aged 74) Springfield, Massachusetts, US
- Denomination: Roman Catholic
- Education: Mungret College; Grand Séminaire de Montréal
- Motto: Viam veritatis elegi (I have chosen the way of truth)

Thomas Michael O'Leary (August 16, 1875 – October 10, 1949) is an American prelate of the Roman Catholic Church. He served as the bishop of the Diocese of Springfield in Massachusetts from 1921 until his death in 1949.

== Biography ==
=== Early life ===
The third of seven children, Thomas O'Leary was born on August 16, 1875, in Dover, New Hampshire, to Michael and Margaret (née Howland) O'Leary. He attended elementary school and high school in Dover, graduating in 1887. He then traveled to Ireland to attend Mungret College in Limerick, obtaining a Bachelor of Arts degree in 1892. O'Leary went to Canada to study philosophy and theology at the Grand Seminary of Montreal in Montreal, Quebec.

=== Priesthood ===
O'Leary was ordained to the priesthood in Montreal for the Diocese of Manchester by Bishop Maxime Decelles on December 18, 1897. After his ordination, O'Leary spent six months as assistant pastor at St. Ann's Parish in Manchester, New Hampshire from 1898 to 1899. He was then sent to St. John's Parish in Concord, New Hampshire to serve as assistant pastor from 1899 to 1904. O'Leary then spent three more years at St. John's as parish administrator. O'Leary was named chancellor in 1904 and vicar general in 1914 of the diocese. He also served as chaplain to the Sisters of the Sacred Blood congregation and editor of the diocese newspaper Guidon. According to author Kevin Donovan, O'Leary was considered to be rigid, unapproachable and distant by his fellow clergy, and they were not sorry to see him go to Springfield.

=== Bishop of Springfield in Massachusetts ===
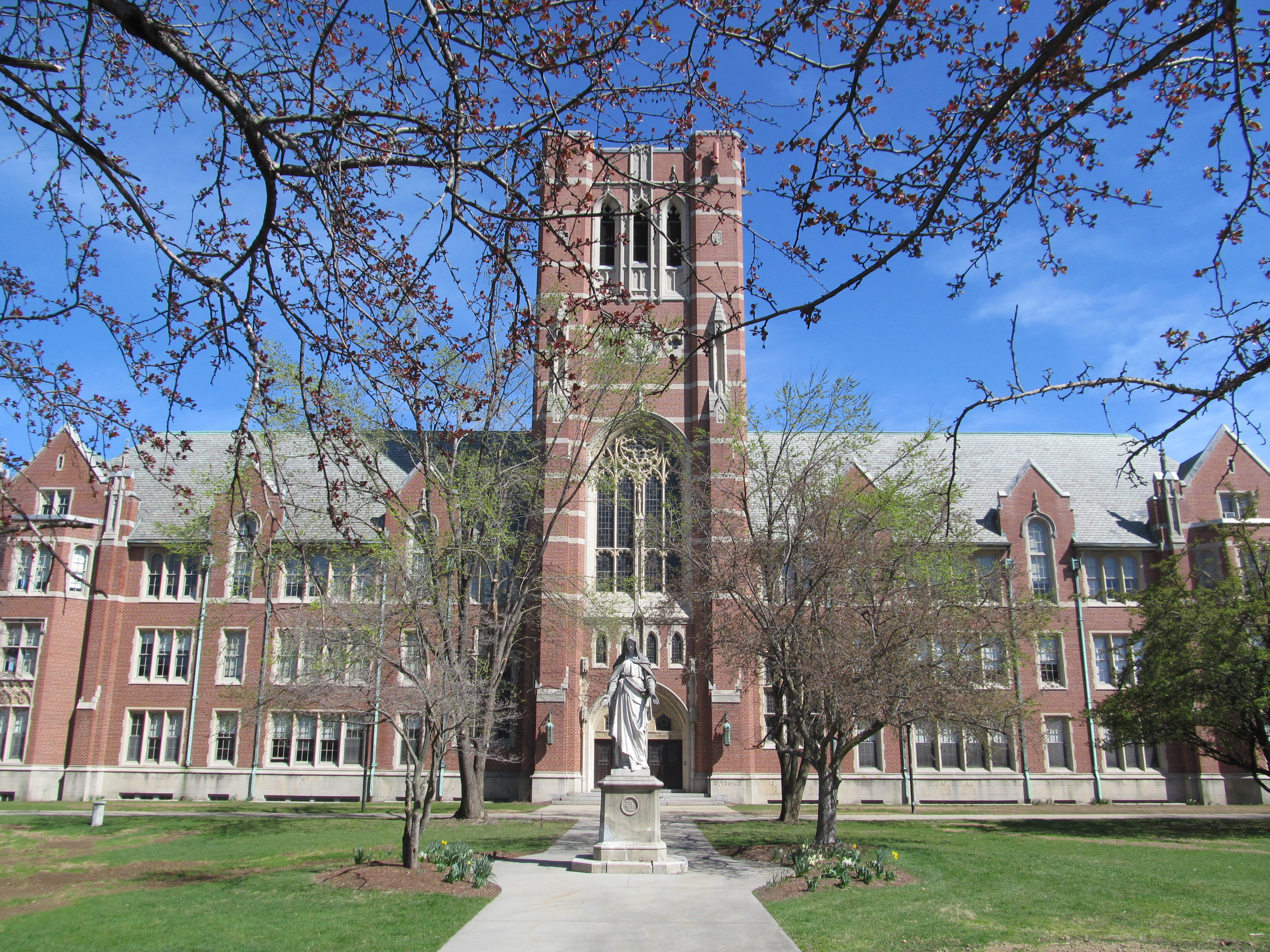
Elms College, Chicopee, Massachusetts (2012)

On June 16, 1921, O'Leary was appointed bishop of Springfield in Massachusetts by Pope Benedict XV. He received his episcopal consecration at St. Michael's Cathedral in Springfield on September 8, 1921, from Archbishop Arthur Alfred Sinnott, with Bishops Michael Curley and George Guertin serving as co-consecrators. During his tenure, O'Leary introduced the Passionists and Sisters of Providence, expanded Mercy Hospital in Springfield and opened 24 new parishes.

In 1928, O'Leary spearheaded the founding of Our Lady of the Elms College in Chicopee, Massachusetts, the first Catholic college for women in Western Massachusetts. O'Leary served as its first president until his death in 1949. He described the college's educational aims:... to speak convincingly, write gracefully, spend leisure time profitably, and assume responsibility easily." In 1943, during World War II, O'Leary authorized the collection of clothing at parishes to be sent to war victims in the Soviet Union as part of the Russian War Relief effort. He was one of only four Catholic bishops in the United States to participate in this drive.

=== Death ===
Thomas O'Leary died in Springfield on October 10, 1949, at age 74. O'Leary Hall, a student residence at Elms College in Chicopee, Massachusetts, is named after him.

Catholic Church titles
Preceded by Thomas Daniel Beaven	Bishop of Springfield in Massachusetts; 1921–1949	Succeeded by Christopher Joseph Weldon
