= Joseph Francis Maguire =

American prelate

His Excellency, The Most Reverend Joseph Francis Maguire
- Bishop of Springfield in Massachusetts
- See: Diocese of Springfield in Massachusetts
- Installed: October 15, 1977
- Term ended: December 27, 1991
- Predecessor: Christopher Joseph Weldon
- Successor: John Aloysius Marshall
- Previous posts: Auxiliary Bishop of Boston (1972 to 1976); Coadjutor Bishop of Springfield (1976 to 1977)

Orders
- Ordination: June 29, 1945 by Richard James Cushing
- Consecration: February 2, 1972

Personal details
- Born: September 4, 1919 Boston, Massachusetts US
- Died: November 23, 2014 (aged 95) Springfield, Massachusetts, US
- Denomination: Roman Catholic Church
- Education: Boston College; St. John's Seminary
- Motto: Nihil impossible apud Deum (Nothing is impossible with God)

Ordination history of Joseph Francis Maguire
History
Episcopal consecration
- Consecrated by: Humberto Sousa Medeiros
Episcopal succession
Bishops consecrated by Joseph Francis Maguire as principal consecrator
- Leo Edward O'Neil: August 22, 1980
- Thomas Ludger Dupré: May 31, 1990

Joseph Francis Maguire (September 4, 1919 – November 23, 2014) was an American prelate of the Roman Catholic Church. He served as bishop of the Diocese of Springfield in Massachusetts from 1977 to 1991. He previously serve as an auxiliary bishop of the Archdiocese of Boston in Massachusetts from 1972 to 1977 and as coadjutor bishop of Springfield from 1976 to 1977.

== Biography ==
=== Early life ===
Maguire was born on September 4, 1919, in the Roxbury section of Boston, Massachusetts. After grammar school, he attended St. Columbkille High School in the Brighton neighborhood. He attended Boston College, where he earned a Bachelor of Arts degree in 1941. As a young man, Maguire played both hockey and baseball. Maguire then began his studies for the priesthood at St. John's Seminary in Boston.

=== Priesthood ===
Maguire was ordained a priest in Boston for the Archdiocese of Boston on June 29, 1945 by Archbishop Richard James Cushing. After his ordination, Maguire had the following posts as assistant pastor in Massachusetts parishes:

- St. Joseph's in Lynn
- St. Anne's in Readville
- Blessed Sacrament in Jamaica Plain
- St. Mary of the Hills in Milton

From 1956 to 1959, Maguire served as a chaplain in the United States Army Reserve and the Massachusetts National Guard. He served as priest-secretary to Cardinal Richard Cushing and his successor, Cardinal Humberto Medeiros, between 1962 and 1971. Maguire was pastor of St. John the Baptist Parish in Quincy, Massachusetts, from 1971 to 1972.

=== Auxiliary Bishop of Boston ===
On December 1, 1971, Maguire was appointed auxiliary bishop of Boston and titular bishop of Mactaris by Pope Paul VI. He received his episcopal consecration at the Cathedral of the Holy Cross in Boston on February 2, 1972, from Cardinal Medeiros, with bishops Jeremiah Minihan and Thomas Riley serving as co-consecrators.

=== Coadjutor Bishop and Bishop of Springfield ===
Maguire was named coadjutor bishop of Springfield on April 13, 1976 by Paul VI. Upon the resignation of Bishop Christopher Weldon, Maguire automatically succeeded him on October 15, 1977.

As bishop, Maguire created a program to train permanent deacons for parish service. He also established the Apostolate for Black Catholics. He recruited 300 lay members from the diocese to visit the sick and disabled at home or in institutions. Maguire received the Human Relations Award in 1986 from the National Conference of Christians and Jews.

=== Retirement and legacy ===
On December 27, 1991, Pope John Paul II accepted Maguire's resignation as bishop of Springfield. In 2005, he underwent aortic valve replacement and bypass surgery. In 1993, the Maguire Center for Health, Fitness and Athletics at Elms College in Chicopee, Massachusetts, was named for Maguire.

In 2012, it was revealed that Maguire and former Springfield Bishop Thomas Dupre approved a $500,000 settlement in a sexual abuse case. The plaintiff, Andrew Nicastro, claimed that he was sexually abused as a minor by Reverend Alfred F. Graves, a diocesan priest, from 1982 to 1985. According to the lawsuit, Maguire had transferred Graves to another parish after a sexual abuse accusation in 1976. Graves was barred from ministry in the 1990's and defrocked in 2006. At the time of the settlement, Maguire made this statement:

I only wish that in 1976 as a new bishop, I could have foreseen the true nature of one who violated our trust with such devastating harm to his victims.

Joseph Maguire died in Springfield at age 95 on November 23, 2014. In remarks to Jobserve.org after Maguire's death, Springfield Bishop Mitchell T. Rozanski said:

"From the time of his arrival ... Bishop Maguire quickly became the 'people's bishop' and was known for his priestly ministry, which extended to attending numerous parish and diocesan events," iobserve.org said. "He had the ability to not only remember names of people, but also recall personal and family details. He also was a regular visitor at area hospitals at all hours of the day and attended many wakes."
