= Thomas Daniel Beaven =

American prelate

His Excellency, The Right Reverend Thomas Daniel Beaven
- Bishop of Springfield
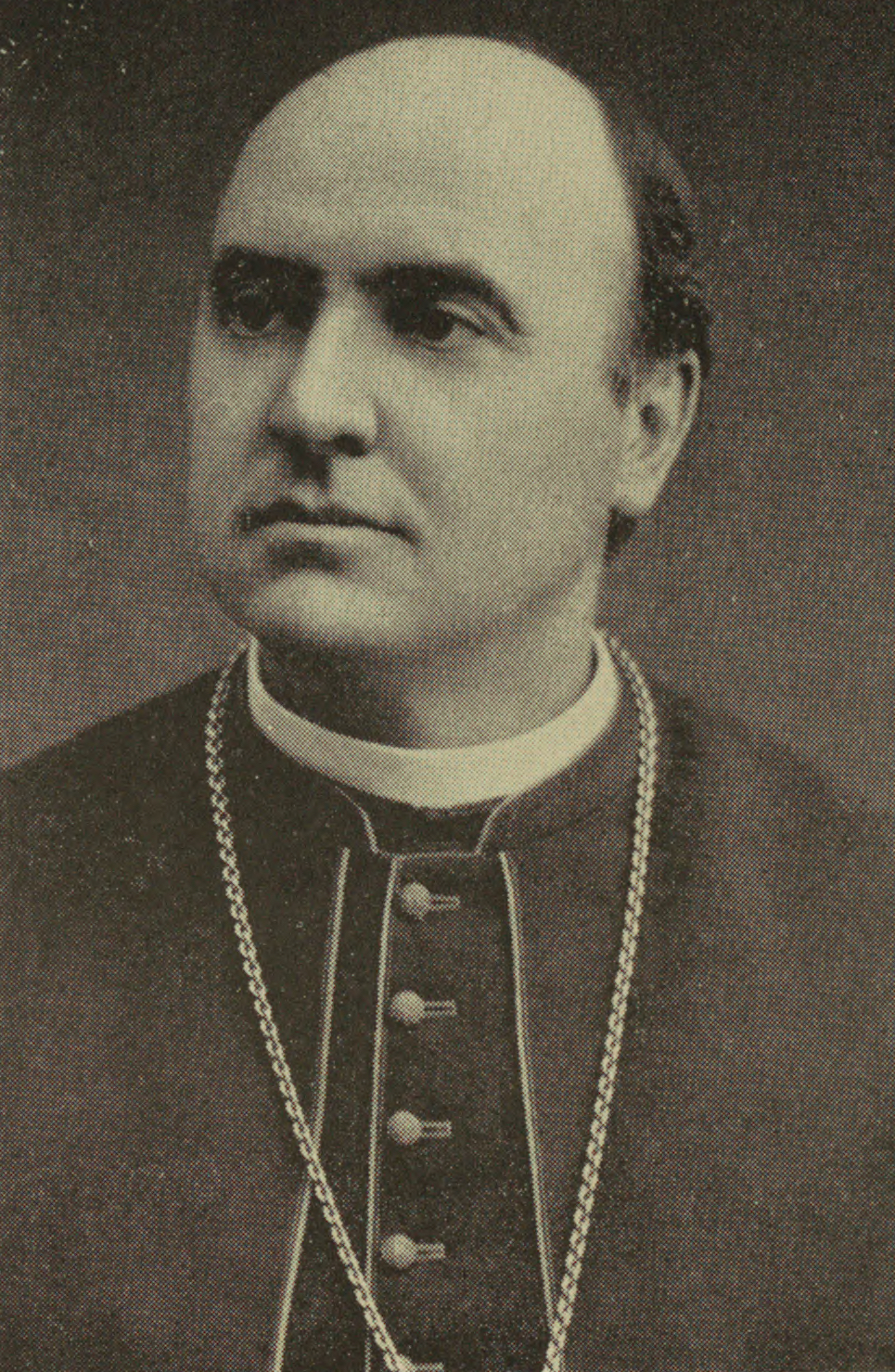
- Church: Catholic
- Diocese: Diocese of Springfield
- Predecessor: Patrick Thomas O'Reilly
- Successor: Thomas Michael O'Leary

Orders
- Ordination: December 18, 1875 by Édouard-Charles Fabre
- Consecration: October 18, 1892 by John Joseph Williams

Personal details
- Born: March 1, 1851 Springfield, Massachusetts, U.S.
- Died: October 5, 1920 (aged 69) Springfield
- Denomination: Roman Catholic
- Education: College of the Holy Cross (AB); Grand Séminaire de Montréal
- Motto: Michael salutis signifer (Michael is the standard bearer of salvation)

Thomas Daniel Beaven (March 1, 1851 – October 5, 1920) was an American prelate of the Roman Catholic Church. He served as the second bishop of the Diocese of Springfield in Massachusetts from 1892 to 1920.

== Early life ==
Thomas Beaven was born on March 1, 1851, in Springfield, Massachusetts. He received his early education there. After graduating from the College of the Holy Cross in Worcester, Massachusetts. In 1870, he taught mathematics at Loyola College in Baltimore, Maryland for a year. Beaven then studied theology at the Grand Seminary of Montreal in Montreal, Quebec.

== Priesthood ==
Beaven was ordained to the priesthood in Montreal by Archbishop Édouard-Charles Fabre for the Diocese of Springfield on December 18, 1875. He then served as assistant pastor of a parish in Spencer, Massachusetts, until 1879, when he became its pastor. In 1888, he was appointed pastor of Holy Rosary Parish in Holyoke, Massachusetts.

== Bishop of Springfield ==
On August 9, 1892, Beaven was appointed bishop of the Diocese of Springfield by Pope Leo XIII. He received his episcopal consecration on October 18, 1892, from Archbishop John Williams, with Bishops Denis Bradley and John Michaud serving as co-consecrators, at St. Michael's Cathedral in Springfield. A humble individual, Beaven preferred to ride the trolley rather than use a private carriage to get around Springfield.

In addition to French and Irish parishes, Beaven established churches in the diocese for Polish, Italian, Lithuanian, Slovak and Maronite Rite Catholics. During his tenure, he opened the Beaven-Kelly Home for senior men; a home for abandoned infants; hospitals in Worcester, Springfield, Montague, and Adams; orphanages in Holyoke, Worcester, and Leicester; a House of the Good Shepherd at Springfield; and residences for single working women in many places.

== Death ==
Thomas Beaven died in Springfield on October 5, 1920, at age 69. He was buried in St. Augustine’s Chapel at St. Michael’s Cathedral in Springfield.

Catholic Church titles
Preceded by Patrick Thomas O'Reilly	Bishop of Springfield in Massachusetts; 1892–1920	Succeeded by Thomas Michael O'Leary
