= Richard R. Lavigne =

American priest (1941–2021)

- Lavigne in a 2008 police photo
- Born: February 18, 1941; Massachusetts, U.S.
- Died: May 21, 2021 (aged 80); Greenfield, Massachusetts, U.S.
- Known for: Child sexual abuse; Being the prime suspect in the 1972 murder of Danny Croteau
- Conviction: Rape of a child (2 counts)
- Penalty: Psychiatric treatment and 10 years' probation

Ecclesiastical career
- Church: Catholic Church
- Ordained: 1966
- Laicized: 2003

Richard Roger Lavigne (February 18, 1941 – May 21, 2021) was a laicized priest of the Roman Catholic Diocese of Springfield in Massachusetts and a convicted sex offender. Lavigne was at the center of the priest abuse scandal in the Diocese of Springfield with at least 63 claims of sexual abuse of minors placed against him.

== Biography ==
Richard Lavigne was born in 1941 and raised in Chicopee, Massachusetts. He was the only child of Annette (née Cote; 1915–2005) and Ovila Lavigne (1908–2000). He claimed that his father owned a shoe store in the city.

In 1966, Lavigne was ordained a priest. He initially requested to teach at Cathedral High School in Springfield, which was denied.

=== Priesthood ===
Lavigne was regarded as the "cool" priest of his parish—"[fancying] himself as the Bobby Kennedy of priests", as one parishioner put it. He held countercultural beliefs growing in popularity at the time, such as opposition to the Vietnam War and police brutality, which caused tensions within the community at St. Catherine. He also allowed children to drink leftover sacramental wine and look through Playboy magazines he kept under the seats of his convertible. Despite his popular reputation among children, he was also known to have a violent temper.

== Child sexual abuse ==
Lavigne was removed from ministry by Bishop John Marshall in 1991. He pleaded guilty to two counts of child sexual abuse on June 26, 1992, and was the only suspect named in the long-unsolved 1972 murder of 13-year-old altar boy Danny Croteau. In 1995, DNA tests failed to link Lavigne to the Croteau murder, and the Hampden County District Attorney, William Bennett, did not bring any charges against Lavigne. Lavigne was laicized by the Holy See on November 20, 2003. According to the Massachusetts Sex Offender Registry, Lavigne spent the last two years of his life "in violation", and his last known residence was in Chicopee.

Lavigne died in May 2021 of acute hypoxic respiratory failure as a result of COVID-19-related pneumonia, just hours after the Hampden County district attorney Anthony D. Gulluni's office had begun preparing an arrest warrant in the 1972 case, based on deathbed admissions by Lavigne of specific details. Gullini declared Lavigne responsible for the death of Danny Croteau.

Two Springfield Roman Catholic bishops, Christopher Joseph Weldon (1905–1982) and Thomas Dupré, were named as child molesters who each covered up the abuse and murder of Danny Croteau by Lavigne, who was in their charge.

== See also ==
- John Geoghan
- James Porter
- Paul Shanley
- James Talbot
