= William Draper Byrne =

Bishop of the Roman Catholic Church

His Excellency, The Most Reverend William Draper Byrne
- Bishop of Springfield in Massachusetts
- Diocese: Diocese of Springfield in Massachusetts
- Appointed: October 14, 2020
- Installed: December 14, 2020
- Predecessor: Mitchell T. Rozanski

Orders
- Ordination: June 25, 1994 by James Aloysius Hickey
- Consecration: December 14, 2020 by Seán Patrick O'Malley, James F. Checchio, and Austin Vetter

Personal details
- Born: September 26, 1964 (age 62) Washington, D.C., US
- Denomination: Roman Catholic
- Education: College of the Holy Cross (BA); Pontifical University of Saint Thomas Aquinas (STB, STL)
- Motto: In spem vivam (In living hope)

Styles of William Draper Byrne
- Reference style: His Excellency; The Most Reverend
- Spoken style: Your Excellency
- Religious style: Bishop

William Draper Byrne (born September 26, 1964) is an American Catholic prelate who has served as Bishop of Springfield in Massachusetts since 2020. He is known for taking over the diocese after the revelation of widespread clergy child sex abuse and the subsequent cover-ups.

== Biography ==
=== Early life ===
William Byrne was born on September 26, 1964, in Washington, D.C., the son of Mary and William Draper Byrne, a surgeon. William Byrne grew up in McLean, Virginia, and attended the Mater Dei School in Bethesda, Maryland. Starting in the ninth grade, Byrne enrolled at Georgetown Preparatory School in Rockville, Maryland.

Byrne completed his undergraduate studies at the College of the Holy Cross in Worcester, Massachusetts. According to Byrne's older sister, Dede Byrne, he was influenced in college to become a priest by the example of their uncle, John Byrne, a priest in New York City.

While a seminarian, Byrne studied at the Pontifical North American College in Rome. He received a Bachelor of Sacred Theology in 1992 and a Licentiate of Sacred Theology in 1994 from the Pontifical University of Saint Thomas Aquinas.

=== Priesthood ===
Byrne was ordained to the priesthood for the Archdiocese of Washington on June 25, 1994, by Archbishop James Hickey at The Cathedral of Saint Matthew the Apostle in Washington, D.C.

After his ordination, the archdiocese assigned Byrne as parochial vicar at Little Flower Parish in Bethesda for one year. It then transferred him to work as parochial vicar at Shrine of Saint Jude Parish in Rockville. In 1999, the archdiocese named Byrne as chaplain for the University of Maryland's Catholic Student Center in College Park, Maryland, serving there until 2007.

From 2007 to 2015, Byrne was pastor of St. Peter's Parish in Washington, DC. While in that position he began a special ministry to Catholic members of the United States Congress. From 2009 to 2015, Byrne served as secretary for pastoral ministry and social concerns for the archdiocese. In 2015, he left St. Peter's to become pastor of Our Lady of Mercy Parish in Potomac, Maryland. Before his appointment as bishop, Byrne gained national attention for his writings and YouTube videos.

=== Bishop of Springfield in Massachusetts ===
Pope Francis named Byrne as bishop of Springfield in Massachusetts on October 14, 2020. He received his episcopal consecration at St. Michael's Cathedral in Springfield on December 14, 2020, from Cardinal Sean O'Malley, with Bishops James F. Checchio and Austin Vetter serving as co-consecrators.

In May 2021, Byrne released an expanded list of priests within the diocese who faced credible accusations of sexual abuse. He said:

As a Church, both locally and universally, too many times in the past we have failed to protect the innocence and dignity of minors from those who committed these heinous crimes. We can never erase the harm done, however, acknowledging a survivor's allegations to be credible brings the truth of their horrific experience into the light. I offer my most sincere apology to all who have suffered from the abuse and to their loved ones. I am truly sorry.

In November 2023, the US Conference of Catholic Bishops elected Byrne as chair of its Committee on Communications.

== See also ==
- Catholic Church hierarchy
- Catholic Church in the United States
- Historical list of the Catholic bishops of the United States
- List of Catholic bishops of the United States
- Lists of patriarchs, archbishops, and bishops

== Episcopal succession ==
Catholic Church titles
Preceded by Mitchell T. Rozanski	Bishop of Springfield in Massachusetts; 2020-Present	Succeeded by Incumbent
