= Thomas Ludger Dupré =

American prelate (1933–2016)

His Excellency, The Most Reverend Thomas Ludger Dupré
- Bishop of Springfield in Massachusetts
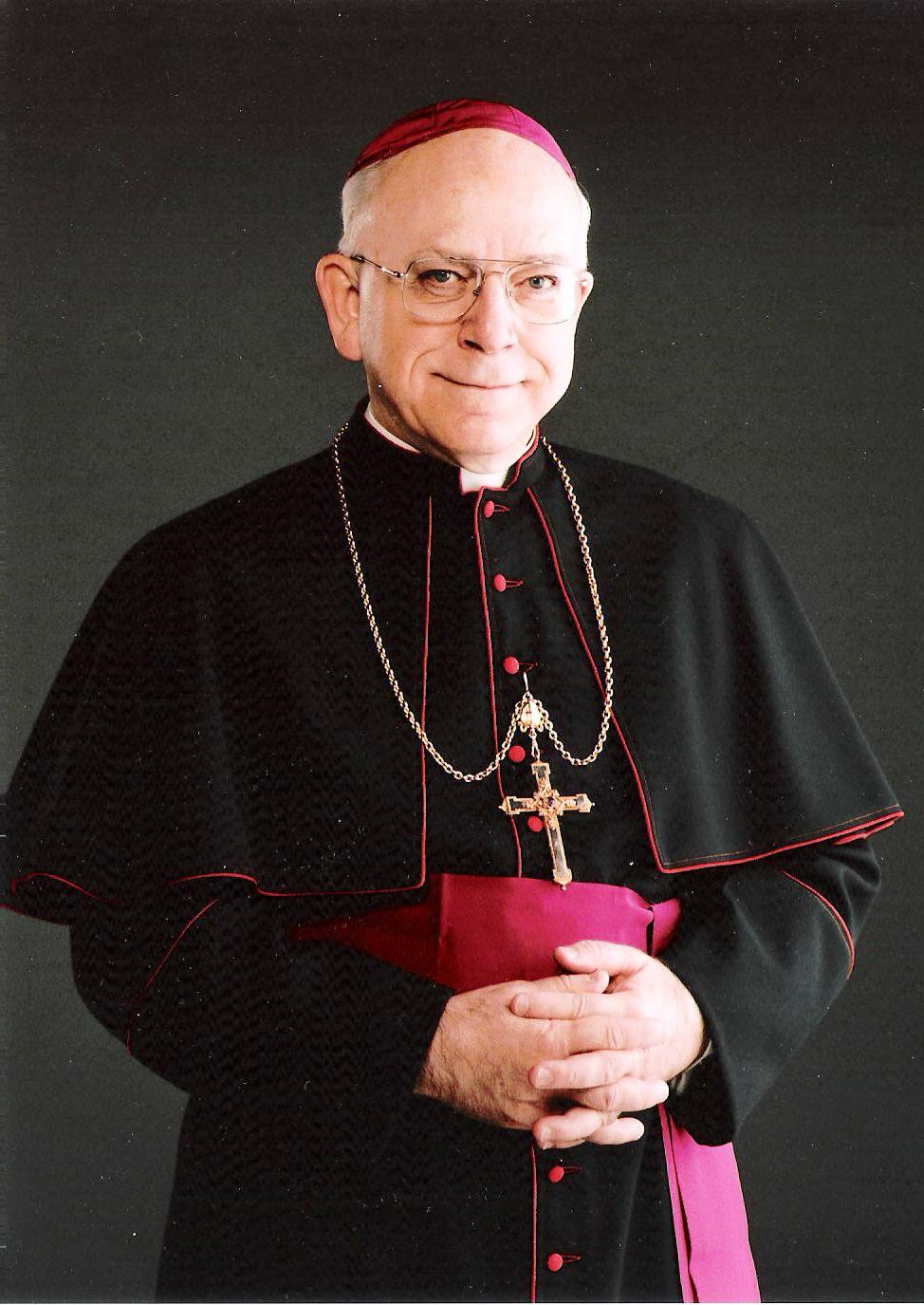
- See: Diocese of Springfield in Massachusetts
- In office: May 8, 1995 – February 11, 2004
- Predecessor: John Aloysius Marshall
- Successor: Timothy A. McDonnell
- Other posts: Auxiliary Bishop of Springfield in Massachusetts; 1990 to 1995

Orders
- Ordination: May 23, 1959 by Christopher Weldon
- Consecration: May 31, 1990 by Joseph Maguire

Personal details
- Born: November 10, 1933 South Hadley, Massachusetts, U.S.
- Died: December 30, 2016 (aged 83) Silver Spring, Maryland, U.S.
- Denomination: Roman Catholic
- Education: Assumption College; Grand Seminary of Montreal; Catholic University of America
- Motto: My grace is sufficient

Thomas Ludger Dupré (November 10, 1933 – December 30, 2016) was an American prelate of the Catholic Church. He served as Bishop of Springfield in Massachusetts from 1995 to 2004. He previously served as an auxiliary bishop of the same diocese from 1990 to 1995.

In 2004, Dupré was indicted (but not prosecuted) on two counts of child molestation. He was the first American Catholic bishop to be indicted in the church sexual abuse scandal of the 20th century.

== Biography ==
=== Early life ===
Dupré was born on November 10, 1933, in South Hadley, Massachusetts. As a boy, he attended the Collège de Montréal, a minor seminary in Montreal, Quebec, from 1951 to 1952. Returning to Massachusetts, he briefly attended Assumption College in Worcester, Massachusetts before returning to Montreal in 1955 to study theology at the Grand Seminary of Montreal.

=== Priesthood ===
Dupré was ordained to the priesthood at St. Michael's Cathedral in Springfield, Massachusetts, for the Diocese of Springfield in Massachusetts by Bishop Christopher Weldon in Springfield on May 23, 1959. After his ordination, Dupré served as an assistant pastor at St. George's Parish in Chicopee, Massachusetts until 1964. He was then sent to study at Catholic University of America in Washington, D.C. Returning to Springfield in 1966, Dupré had the following parish assignments in the diocese:

- St. Joseph's in Springfield
- St. John the Baptist in Ludlow (1970–1973)
- Nativity of the Blessed Virgin in Chicopee (1973–1977)
- St. Louis de France in West Springfield (1978–1990)

Dupré was named chancellor of the diocese in 1977 and vicar general in 1989.

=== Auxiliary Bishop and Bishop of Springfield in Massachusetts ===
On April 7, 1990, Dupré was appointed auxiliary bishop of Springfield and titular bishop of Hodelm by Pope John Paul II. He received his episcopal consecration at St. Michael's Cathedral on May 31, 1990, from Bishop Joseph Maguire, with Bishops Timothy Harrington and Leo O'Neil serving as co-consecrators. Dupré was named by John Paul II to succeed Bishop John Marshall as the seventh bishop of Springfield on March 14, 1995. He was installed at St. Michael's Cathedral on May 8, 1995.

In February 2004, The Springfield Republican published what it called credible accusations against of sexual abuse of minors. The accusers were two men who served as altar boys with Dupré during the 1970s. They said that he gave them alcohol, showed them pornography and sexually assaulted them on several occasions. Dupré was also accused by local clergy of covering up abuse charges against several other priests, including Reverend Richard R. Lavigne.

==== Retirement and legacy ====
Dupré's resignation as bishop of the Diocese of Springfield in Massachusetts for health reasons was accepted on February 11, 2004, by John Paul II. Dupré resigned at age 71, four years before the normal retirement age allowed for a bishop.

In September 2004, Dupré was indicted by a Hampden County grand jury in Massachusetts on two counts of child molestation. He thus became the first American Catholic bishop to be indicted during the sexual abuse scandal of the late 20th century. However, the Springfield district attorney's office was forced to drop the charges because the Massachusetts statute of limitations had run out. Dupré then entered St. Luke Institute, a private Catholic psychiatric hospital in Silver Spring, Maryland for treatment

In June 2010, a judge released a transcript and videotape of Dupré's deposition for a civil lawsuit. At the start of the deposition, Dupré states his name and date of birth. After that, he pleads the Fifth Amendment, a constitutional protection against self-incrimination, to each question over the next three hours. Dupré eventually moved to the residence for retired priests in the Archdiocese of Washington in Washington, D.C., leading a life of "prayer and penance."

Dupré died in Silver Spring on December 30, 2016. His funeral in Springfield was private.

== Viewpoints ==
During the 2000 U.S. presidential election, Dupré declared that it was the "obligation and responsibility" of Catholics:

"to vote for the candidate who will promote what is good and oppose what is evil, who will promote the culture of life and oppose the culture of death, who will promote the well-being of society and oppose its moral disintegration."

During his tenure, Dupré publicly expressed his opposition to same-sex marriage and abortion.

== Episcopal succession ==
Catholic Church titles
Preceded by John Aloysius Marshall	Bishop of Springfield in Massachusetts; 1995–2004	Succeeded by Timothy A. McDonnell
