= Saint Mary High School (Westfield, Massachusetts) =

St. Mary's High School
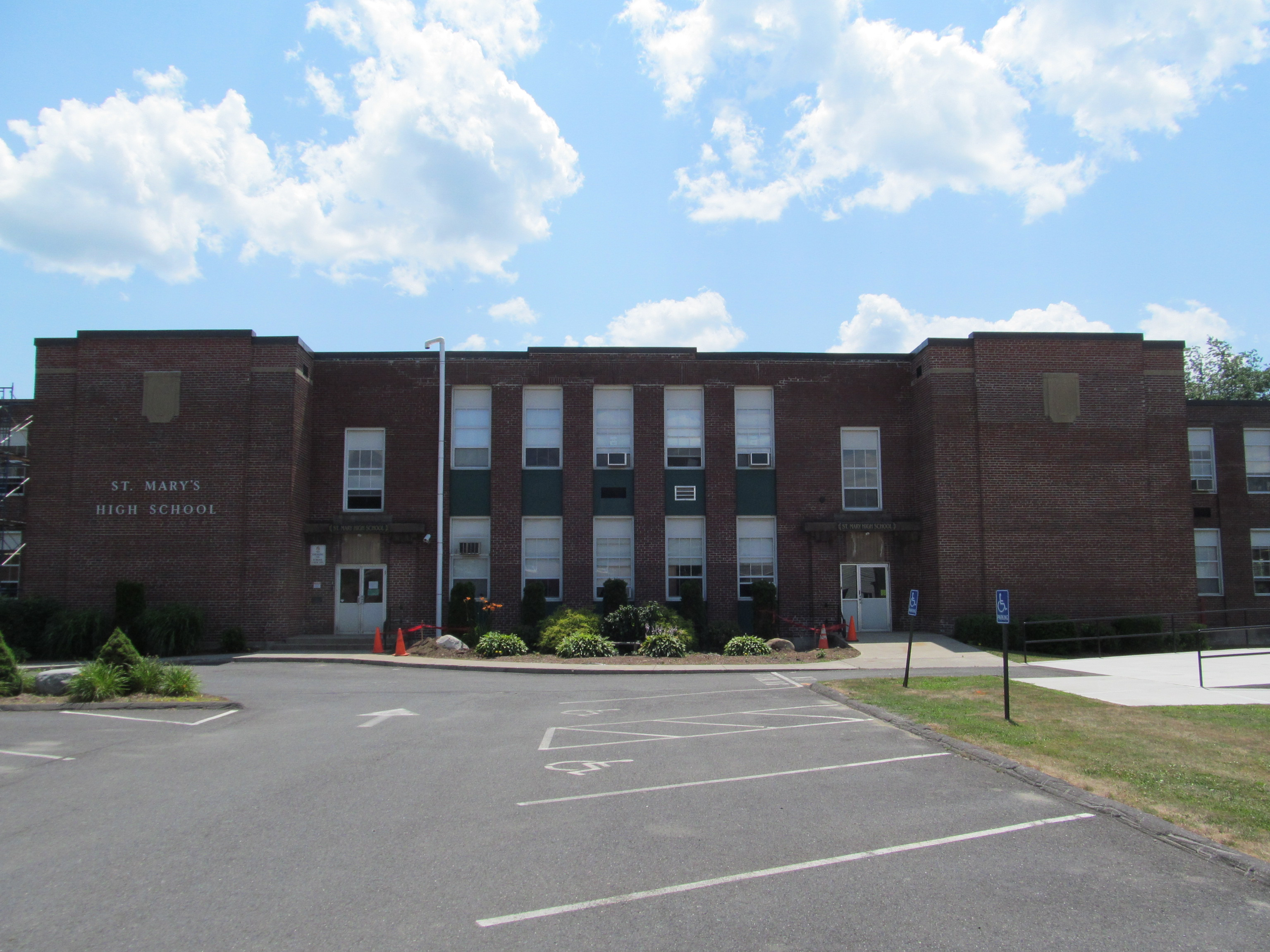
- Saint Mary's High School

Location
- 27 Bartlett Street; Westfield, Massachusetts

Information
- Type: Private, coeducational
- Motto: Pulchra Est (She Is Beautiful)
- Religious affiliation: Roman Catholic
- Established: 1899
- Superintendent: Daniel Baillargeon
- Principal: Matthew Collins
- Chaplain: Jonathan Reardon
- Teaching staff: 16
- Grades: 9–12
- Colors: Green and gold
- Athletics conference: Pioneer Valley
- Sports: Cross country, soccer, golf, skiing, hockey, basketball, tennis, baseball, lacrosse
- Team name: Saints
- Accreditation: New England Association of Schools and Colleges
- Newspaper: The Saints' Herald
- Tuition: $8,350
- Feeder schools: Saint Mary's Elementary School
- Website: https://stmsaintshs.org/

Saint Mary High School is a private, Roman Catholic high school in Westfield, Massachusetts. It is located in the Roman Catholic Diocese of Springfield in Massachusetts, which assumed the financial management of the formerly-parochial school and its programming in August 2019.

St. Mary's offers electives in Art, Music, Social Studies, Mathematics, Science, and English. St. Mary's curriculum offers honors and advanced placement level courses in Math, Science, World Language, and English. Through its virtual high school program offered through Catholic Virtual, St. Mary's offers an additional 200 courses.

== History ==
=== Founding ===
Saint Mary High School was established in 1899

=== 2018 closure attempt ===
In March 2018, following a 43% enrollment drop over the course of 19 years from 1999 to 2018, Father Frank Lawlor announced that the parish high school would close at the conclusion of the 2017–18 school year. The decision to close the school was met with an abundance of emotions in a March 12 meeting to discuss the matter. Lawlor said that the decision to close the school was not monetary, and merely an issue of declining student enrollment. Troy Collins, baseball coach of thirteen years for the High School and St. Mary's alumni, asserted that he was told the decision was because of monetary issues.

In the hours following the meeting, parents, alums, and community members began to organize a grassroots attempt at saving the school. Bob Wilcox, Class of 1988, was a key figure in the organization's efforts: Creating a Facebook group titled "Save Saint Mary's High School" which would eventually grow to over 250 members. This group organized a successful meeting of 200 members less than 24 hours after the first meeting and created plans to hold a prayer vigil for the school alongside a lawn sign campaign. School board Richard Labrie also announced that he was granted a private audience with the Bishop, in which he hoped to voice his support for Saint Mary's High School.

Following the widespread calls for Saint Mary's to stay open, the bishop agreed to give the school another year, with the stipulation that they enroll Freshman classes of more than 20 students. In the 2018–19 school year, however, St. Mary's failed to enroll 20 freshmen, only enrolling 13. Despite this; the bishop allowed the school to remain open.

In January 2019, following a renewed drive behind Saint Mary's High School due in part to new administrators such as principal Matthew Collins and superintendent Daniel Baillargeon, the bishop announced that the school would remain open for the foreseeable future.

=== Diocesan takeover ===
In the leadup to the 2019–2020 school year, St. Mary's High School transitioned from a parochial (run by the local parish) to a diocesan (run by the Larger Catholic Diocese of Springfield) school.
