= Pope Francis Preparatory School =

Location
- 260 Surrey Road; Springfield, Massachusetts 01118; United States; 42°06′01″N 72°32′31″W

Information
- Former name: Cathedral High School
- Type: Private, College-preparatory
- Motto: Virtue Alone Ennobles
- Religious affiliation: Roman Catholic
- Established: 1883; 143 years ago
- Founder: Sisters of Saint Joseph
- Principal: Cindy Geiger
- Grades: 9–12
- Gender: Co-educational
- Enrollment: approx. 400 (2023–2024)
- Student to teacher ratio: 10:1
- Colors: Red; White
- Athletics conference: Pioneer Valley Interscholastic Athletic Conference
- Team name: Cardinals
- Annual tuition: $13,250 (2025–2026)
- Website: https://popefrancisprep.org/

Pope Francis Preparatory School is a private co-educational high school, located on Surrey Road in Springfield in Massachusetts, United States. Founded in 1883 as Cathedral High School, it is a college-preparatory school. As of 2024, the school had approximately 400 pupils enrolled.

== Governance ==
The school is overseen by the Roman Catholic Diocese of Springfield.

== History ==
=== Cathedral High School ===
In 1883, the diocese's Bishop Patrick Thomas O'Reilly sought a teaching staff for a high school in response to the growing number of Catholic immigrants in the area. Responding to the call, two members of the Sisters of Saint Joseph from Flushing, New York came to Springfield to start up the school at St. Michael's Cathedral. In the years that followed Cathedral High School flourished in facilities on Elliot Street in downtown Springfield. By the 1950s the school had grown to nearly 1600 students. The school had outgrown its facilities, so the Diocese purchased a 30-acre (121,000 m^{2}) farm on Surrey and Wendover Roads in Springfield and built a new school. It opened on September 9, 1959. In the first decade at Surrey Road student enrollment grew to more than 2600 students.

In 2002 the school was re-accredited by New England Association of Schools and Colleges.

In 2004, the school welcomed its first lay principal. With this, all Cathedral's academic leadership, including vice-principal, guidance director, business manager, librarians, and all department heads were lay people.

In an effort to consolidate the Diocese's educational resources in the wake of increasing financial difficulties, Cathedral High School was selected to host the newly established St. Michael's Academy, which hosted students from Grades 6 to 8. From 2008 to 2009, Cathedral was extensively remodeled to accommodate the new facility, which occupied a full wing of the main school facility.

On June 1, 2011, Cathedral High School was severely damaged in the tornado that struck Springfield, Massachusetts. The building was declared a total loss. The school was based out of Memorial Elementary School in neighboring Wilbraham, Massachusetts from the 2011–2012 school year until 2016. Demolition of the school was completed in 2015. The same year, it was announced that Cathedral High School would merge with Holyoke Catholic High School in Chicopee to form a new regional Catholic school. Before merging, the school enrollment had fallen to approximately 250 students; 70% of the students were from Springfield itself.

The new building was opened in 2016 and reopened as Pope Francis High School. The school was later renamed to the current moniker. The school's current building is on the site of the original Cathedral High School.

Throughout its history, Cathedral High School had predominantly served the students of the City of Springfield. However, many of its students had come from the suburbs of the city and some as far away as Sunderland, Palmer, and Connecticut. The school is a college-preparatory program, where 96% of the graduates further their education.

== Curriculum ==
Cathedral High School offered College Prep, Advanced Placement, and Honors classes within the STREAM (Science, Technology, Religion, Engineering, Arts and Math) program. Cathedral High School had religion, science, English, fine arts & business, social studies, foreign language, physical education and mathematics departments.

Within their respective departments, Cathedral offered classes in scripture, world religions, earth science, biology, chemistry, physics, journalism, computer literacy, art (painting, drawing, and sculpture), United States History, World History, sociology, Spanish, French, Latin, algebra, geometry, calculus, trigonometry, and statistics. Many of these classes and others were available as college prep or honors. Advanced Placement were available in English, Calculus, Statistics, US History, Biology, Chemistry, Physics and Latin.

== Sports and extracurricular activities ==
The school plays sports as the Pope Francis Preparatory School Cardinals. Before the merger, the school's colors were purple and white. Cathedral's mascot was a Panther, and the squads were often referred to as the Purple Panthers. With the exception of Field Hockey and Football, all sports at Cathedral had both boys' and girls' teams. Football, soccer, basketball, and baseball all had freshman, junior varsity, and varsity teams. The others had JV and varsity teams. In the years prior to the merger, the school was perhaps best known for its Ice Hockey team.

=== Hockey ===
Cathedral High School hockey won their first state championship in 1996 when they beat Hingham High School 2–0 in a Division 2 Championship Game.

=== Ice hockey ===
In 2009, the Cathedral High School ice hockey team won the Division 1 State Championship for the first time since 2003, beating Arlington Catholic, the Division 1 North Champions, for the title.

=== Other sports ===
Other sports currently played at the school include:

- American football
- Athletics
- Soccer
- Golf
- Basketball
- Swimming
- Lacrosse
- Baseball
- Softball
- Tennis

=== Other activities ===
Clubs include National Honor Society, language clubs, choir, Outdoor Adventure club, and Model UN.

== Campus ==
The school's Surrey Road campus was in Springfield's East Forest Park Neighborhood on a green and hilly plot of land which is now the site of Pope Francis Preparatory School.

=== Original building ===
The school was divided into four main sections. Most of the classrooms were in a building that, from the air, was shaped like a boxy eight with two courtyards in the open spaces formed by the eight. A small chapel took up part of the first floor in one of the courtyards. The school offices were near the main entrance, and the cafeteria extended towards the few athletic fields.

Extending north from the main building was the science wing. Because of the hills the school was built in, the science wing's first and second floors were just above the main building's second and third floors. The auditorium abutted the main building and was the largest high school auditorium in the area. On a lower grade than the rest of the school, were the gymnasium, a parking lot, and playing fields which included a full size football field that doubled as a soccer and lacrosse field. Island Pond, on the eastern edge of the property, featured a rare floating island.

== Notable alumni ==
Angelo Bertelli

Peter Welch

=== Cathedral High School ===
Ryan Leonard

==== Sports ====
- Scott Barnes - Drafted by the Washington Nationals in the 43rd round of the 2005 MLB June Amateur Draft and the San Francisco Giants in the 8th round of the 2008 MLB June Amateur Draft.
- Angelo Bertelli - 1943 Heisman Trophy winner at Notre Dame
- Nick Buoniconti - NFL Hall of Fame Linebacker
- Chris Capuano - MLB pitcher
- Vinny Del Negro - NBA Point Guard from 1988 to 2001 and former head coach of the Los Angeles Clippers
- Paul Fenton - Former NHL player and current assistant general manager of the Nashville Predators
- Mike Flynn - Baltimore Ravens offensive linemen
- Nick Gorneault - Former MLB player (Los Angeles Angels)
- Bob Kudelski - 9-year veteran in the NHL
- Joe Scibelli - 15-year veteran in the NFL as a guard for the LA Rams
- John Leonard - Professional ice hockey player
- Tim Mayotte - Tennis Professional
- Derek Kellogg - University of Massachusetts Men's Basketball Head Coach

==== Arts and media ====
- Bill Danoff - Singer & Songwriter, Member of Starland Vocal Band, Wrote John Denver's "Country Roads"
- John Shea - Actor, film producer, and stage director. Best known for such films as the Academy Award-nominated film Missing (1982) and as Lex Luthor on the TV series Lois & Clark: The New Adventures of Superman.
- Tommy Tallarico - American video game music composer and musician

==== Politics and Law ====
- Wayne Budd - Former Assistant US Attorney General
- Larry O'Brien - Advisor to President Kennedy, Postmaster General and NBA commissioner
- Thomas Reilly - Former Massachusetts Attorney General
- Peter Welch - Democratic Congressman from Vermont

=== Pope Francis Preparatory School ===
- Ryan Leonard - Professional ice hockey player
