= Patrick Thomas O'Reilly =

Catholic bishop

His Excellency, The Right Reverend Patrick Thomas O'Reilly
- Bishop of Springfield
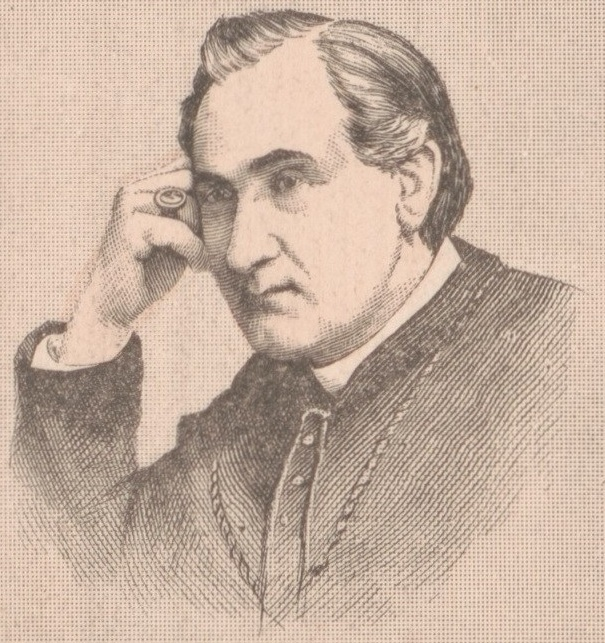
- See: Diocese of Springfield
- In office: September 25, 1870 to May 28, 1892
- Predecessor: None
- Successor: Thomas Daniel Beaven

Orders
- Ordination: August 15, 1857 by David William Bacon
- Consecration: September 25, 1870 by John McCloskey

Personal details
- Born: December 24, 1833 Cavan, Ireland
- Died: May 28, 1892 (aged 58) Springfield, Massachusetts, US
- Denomination: Roman Catholic
- Education: St. Charles College; St. Mary's Seminary
- Motto: Quis ut Deus (Who is like God)

Patrick Thomas O'Reilly (December 24, 1833 – May 28, 1892) was an Irish-born prelate of the Roman Catholic Church. He served as the first bishop of the Diocese of Springfield in Massachusetts from 1870 to 1892.

== Biography ==
=== Early life ===
Patrick O'Reilly was born on December 24, 1833, in Cavan, Ireland, the son of Philip and Mary Conaty O'Reilly. The family immigrated to Boston, Massachusetts,. He attended St. Charles's College in Ellicott City, Maryland to study classics, then studied theology at St. Mary's Seminary in Baltimore, Maryland.

==== Priesthood ====
O'Reilly was ordained to the priesthood for the Archdiocese of Boston at the Cathedral of the Holy Cross in Boston on August 15, 1857, by Bishop David Bacon. After his ordination, O'Reilly served as assistant pastor at St. John's Parish in Worcester, Massachusetts. He then went back to Boston to organize St. Joseph's Parish there. In 1864, he returned to Worcester to serve as pastor of St. John's Parish.

=== Bishop of Springfield ===
Pope Pius IX appointed O'Reilly as the first bishop of the newly established Diocese of Springfield on June 18, 1870. He was consecrated in Springfield, Massachusetts, on September 25, 1870, by Cardinal John McCloskey; at that time, O'Reilly was the youngest bishop in the United States at age 37.

During his time as bishop, the Catholic population of the diocese increased from 90,000 to 200,000; its priests from 43 to 196; its religious women from 12 to 321. O'Reilly laid the cornerstones of nearly 100 church, school or buildings. The hospital of the Sisters of Providence of Holyoke and the orphanages at Holyoke, Massachusetts, and Worcester, Massachusetts, were begun during his administration. O'Reilly persuaded the Sisters of Charity and the Sisters of Notre Dame de Namur to set up congregations in the diocese. Mercy Hospital in Springfield developed from a Holyoke mission of the Sisters of Providence of St. Vincent de Paul.

According to author Stephen Kiltonic, O'Reilly was described as tall with "very kind gray eyes that would twinkle with humor". "The old folks, who remember him, speak of his quiet but convincing eloquence, his constant affability and kindness, his abiding trust in God that, to every cloud, gave a silver lining." Author William Byrne described O'Reilly as a supportive manager of his priests, allowing them to make decisions on their own.

=== Death ===
Patrick O’Reilly died in Springfield of nephritis on May 28, 1892; businesses in Springfield closed for the day. He was buried in the vault below St. Michael's Cathedral in Springfield.

Catholic Church titles
Preceded by none	Bishop of Springfield in Massachusetts; 1870–1892	Succeeded by Thomas Daniel Beaven
