= Christopher Joseph Weldon =

American prelate

His Excellency, The Most Reverend Christopher Joseph Weldon
- Bishop of Springfield in Massachusetts
- Church: Roman Catholic Church
- See: Springfield in Massachusetts
- In office: March 24, 1950 to October 15, 1977
- Predecessor: Thomas Michael O'Leary
- Successor: Joseph Francis Maguire

Orders
- Ordination: September 21, 1929 by Patrick Joseph Hayes
- Consecration: March 24, 1950 by Francis Spellman

Personal details
- Born: September 6, 1905 New York City, New York, US
- Died: March 19, 1982 (aged 76) Springfield, Massachusetts, US
- Education: Grand Seminary of Montreal; St. Joseph's Seminary; Catholic University of America
- Motto: Ut Christum feram (To bring Christ)

Christopher Joseph Weldon (September 6, 1905 – March 19, 1982) was an American prelate of the Roman Catholic Church. He served as bishop of the Diocese of Springfield in Massachusetts from 1950 to 1977.

In 2020, an investigation by the diocese determined that an accusation of sexual abuse of a minor against Weldon was highly credible.

== Biography ==
=== Early years ===
Christopher Weldon was born on September 6, 1905, in the Bronx section of New York City to Patrick and Mary (née Dwyer) Weldon. After graduating from Public School 9 in Manhattan in 1918, he entered the Grand Seminary of Montreal in Montreal, Quebec. In 1924, Weldon returned to New York to study at St. Joseph's Seminary in Yonkers.

=== Priesthood ===
Weldon was ordained to the priesthood on September 21, 1929, in New York City by Cardinal Patrick Joseph Hayes. Weldon then completed his graduate studies at the Catholic University of America in Washington, D.C. His first pastoral assignment was as assistant pastor at St. John the Evangelist Parish in White Plains, New York, followed by a term at St. Francis of Assisi Parish in Mount Kisco, New York.

From 1931 to 1935, Weldon served as spiritual director at the Newman School in Lakewood, New Jersey. He left New Jersey in 1935 to become pastor at St. John Chrysostom Parish in Bronx, New York. After one year, he was moved to Blessed Sacrament Parish in Manhattan. In 1942, after the American entry into World War II in December 1941, Weldon left New York to serve in the United States Navy Chaplain Corps. Discharged from the Navy in 1946, he returned to New York, where he became master of ceremonies to Cardinal Francis Spellman. Weldon served as executive director of Catholic Charities from 1947 to 1950. The Vatican elevated him to the rank of a papal chamberlain in 1947 and domestic prelate in 1948.

=== Bishop of Springfield ===
On January 28, 1950, Weldon was appointed the fourth bishop of Springfield by Pope Pius XII. He received his episcopal consecration at St. Patrick's Cathedral in Manhattan on March 24, 1950, from Cardinal Spellman, with Archbishop Richard Cushing and Bishop Stephen Joseph Donahue serving as co-consecrators.

During his tenure, Weldon oversaw the construction of Cathedral High School and Our Lady of Lourdes School, both in Springfield. He added a wing to Farren Memorial Hospital in Montague, Massachusetts, and built Mont Marie, the motherhouse of the Sisters of St. Joseph of Springfield. He erected ten new parishes, and constructed 11 churches and several parish centers. Weldon established a center for the Hispanic apostolate in Springfield, and a diocesan newspaper in 1954. Weldon attended the Second Vatican Council in Rome from 1962 to 1965, and served as president of Elms College in Chicopee, Massachusetts, from 1958 to 1977.

=== Retirement and legacy ===
After 27 years as bishop, Weldon resigned on October 15, 1977. Christopher Weldon died on March 19, 1982, at Mercy Hospital in Springfield at age 76. He was buried at Gate of Heaven Cemetery in Springfield.

In September 2018, a diocesan review board notified Bishop Mitchell T. Rozanski that it had found an allegation of sexual abuse by Weldon to be credible. The board cited a Chicopee resident who claimed that Weldon had abused him a child. The board later split on the case, with several members saying that the victim did not name Weldon directly, while three witness claimed otherwise. In June 2019, Rozanski met with the victim, saying he found the allegations "deeply troubling". In June 2020, an investigation by retired Superior Court Judge Peter A. Velis found the victim's claim "to be unequivocally credible."

After Velis' findings were released, Rozanski asked Trinity Health of New England to remove Weldon's name from its rehabilitation center, the former Farren Memorial Hospital in Montague. Weldon's remains were disinterred at Gate of Heaven Cemetery and moved to a more secluded location in the cemetery. Rozanski ordered the removal of all photographs, memorials and other mentions of Weldon from all diocesan facilities, schools and churches.

Catholic Church titles
Preceded by Thomas Michael O'Leary	Bishop of Springfield in Massachusetts; 1950–1977	Succeeded by Joseph Francis Maguire
