= John Aloysius Marshall =

American prelate

His Excellency, The Most Reverend John Aloysius Marshall
- Bishop of Springfield in Massachusetts
- Church: Roman Catholic Church
- See: Diocese of Springfield in Massachusetts
- In office: February 18, 1992 – July 3, 1994
- Predecessor: Joseph Francis Maguire
- Successor: Thomas Ludger Dupré
- Previous post: Bishop of Burlington (1972–1991)

Orders
- Ordination: December 19, 1953 by Martin O'Connor
- Consecration: January 25, 1972 by Robert Joyce

Personal details
- Born: April 24, 1928 Worcester, Massachusetts, U.S.
- Died: July 3, 1994 (aged 66) Springfield, Massachusetts, U.S.
- Education: College of the Holy Cross; Collège de Montréal; Pontifical Gregorian University
- Motto: In unitate spiritus (In the unity of the Spirit)
- Coat of arms

John Aloysius Marshall (April 24, 1928 – July 3, 1994) was an American prelate of the Roman Catholic Church. He served as bishop of the Diocese of Burlington in Vermont from 1972 to 1992 and bishop of the Diocese of Springfield in Massachusetts from 1992 until his death in 1994.

== Biography ==
=== Early life ===
John Marshall was born on April 24, 1928, in Worcester, Massachusetts, to John A. and Katherine T. (née Redican) Marshall. After attending St. John's High School in Shrewsbury, Massachusetts, and the College of the Holy Cross in Worcester, he went to Canada to study at the Collège de Montréal in Montreal, Quebec. Marshall then travelled to Rome to attend the Pontifical Gregorian University.

=== Priesthood ===
While in Rome, Marshall was ordained to the priesthood in Rome for the Diocese of Springfield by Bishop Martin O'Connor on December 19, 1953. After a period of pastoral work, he completed his graduate studies at Assumption College in Worcester (1961–1968). He then returned to Rome for more studies the Pontifical North American College(1969–1971).

=== Bishop of Burlington ===
On December 14, 1971, Marshall was appointed the seventh bishop of Burlington by Pope Paul VI. He received his episcopal consecration at the first Cathedral of the Immaculate Conception in Burlington, Vermont, on January 25, 1972, from Bishop Robert Joyce, with Bishop Bernard Flanagan and James Hickey serving as co-consecrators. His tenure in Burlington was marked by a decline in both vocations and church attendance, but he still founded Our Lady of the Mountains Parish at Sherburne, Vermont, in 1979. Marshall completed the second Cathedral of the Immaculate Conception in Burlington in 1977. An arsonist had destroyed the original cathedral in 1972.

From 1984 to 1990, Marshall headed an apostolic visitation ordered by Pope John Paul II to investigate the doctrinal orthodoxy of American seminaries. The leaders of some seminaries viewed the visitation as an attempt by members of the Roman Curia to force a conservative doctrine on them and stifle any dissent.

=== Bishop of Springfield in Massachusetts ===
Coat of arms as bishop of Burlington

John Paul II named Marshall as the sixth bishop of Springfield in Massachusetts on February 18, 1992.

=== Death and legacy ===
John Marshall died in Springfield on July 3, 1994, at age 66. The Bishop John A. Marshall School in Morrisville, Vermont, was named after Marshall, but changed its name to All Saints Catholic Academy after controversy arose surrounding Marshall tenure as bishop. The Bishop Marshall Center is located in St. Michael's Cathedral in Springfield.

In a 2007 civil lawsuit against the Diocese of Burlington, the personal file of Reverend Alfred Willis, a diocesan priest, showed that Marshall transferred him to a different parish after receiving sexual abuse complaints. In February 1978, three parents from St. Anthony Parish in Burlington accused Willis of sexually abusing a teenage boy on a camping trip in 1977, when Willis was still a deacon. Willis denied the accusations. A psychiatrist told Marshall that Willis just had odd habits. In 1979, Marshall transferred Willis to St. Ann's Parish in Milton, Vermont, without notifying the pastor or the parish of Willis' previous accusations. Other accusations soon emerged from St. Ann's. Marshall sent Willis away for treatment and initiated a church trial, which found Willis guilty. Willis was eventually defrocked in 1985.

In 2008, a Colorado man sued the Diocese of Burlington, saying that the diocese was negligent in hiring a priest who sexually abused him as a minor over 100 times between 1976 and 1978 at Christ the King Church in Burlington. Marshall allowed Reverend Edward Paquette to transfer from the Diocese of Fort Wayne in Indiana, despite warnings from the bishop of Fort Wayne. Paquette was ultimately accused of abusing over 20 children in the Diocese of Burlington.

Catholic Church titles
Preceded by Robert Francis Joyce	Bishop of Burlington; 1972–1992	Succeeded by Kenneth Anthony Angell
Preceded by Joseph Francis Maguire	Bishop of Springfield in Massachusetts; 1992–1994	Succeeded by Thomas Ludger Dupré
