= Mitchell T. Rozanski =

American Roman Catholic bishop

His Excellency, The Most Reverend Mitchell Thomas Rozanski
- Archbishop of St. Louis
- See: Saint Louis
- Appointed: June 10, 2020
- Installed: August 25, 2020
- Predecessor: Robert James Carlson
- Previous posts: Auxiliary Bishop of Baltimore and Titular Bishop of Walla Walla (2004–2014); Bishop of Springfield in Massachusetts (2014-2020)

Orders
- Ordination: November 24, 1984 by William Donald Borders
- Consecration: August 24, 2004 by William Henry Keeler, William Clifford Newman, and William Francis Malooly

Personal details
- Born: August 6, 1958 (age 67) Baltimore, Maryland, US
- Denomination: Roman Catholic
- Motto: Serve the Lord with gladness

Styles of Mitchell Thomas Rozanski
- Reference style: His Excellency; The Most Reverend
- Spoken style: Your Excellency
- Religious style: Archbishop

Mitchell Thomas Rozanski (born August 6, 1958) is an American Catholic prelate who has served as Archbishop of St. Louis since 2020. He previously served as Bishop of Springfield in Massachusetts from 2014 to 2020 and as an auxiliary bishop of the Archdiocese of Baltimore from 2004 to 2014.

== Biography ==
=== Early life and education ===
Mitchell Rozanski was born on August 6, 1958, in Baltimore, Maryland. He attended Sacred Heart of Mary School in Dundalk, Maryland, and Our Lady of Mt. Carmel High School in Essex, Maryland. After his high school graduation, Rozanski entered the Catholic University of America (CUA) in Washington, D.C. He later received his seminary training at CUA's Theological College.

=== Ordination and ministry ===
Rozanski was ordained to the priesthood at the Cathedral of Mary, Our Queen, in Baltimore for the Archdiocese of Baltimore by Archbishop William Borders on November 24, 1984. After his ordination, Rozanksi performed pastoral assignments at the following parishes in Maryland:

- Assistant pastor at St. Michael in Overlea in 1984
- Assistant pastor at the Cathedral of Mary Our Queen in Baltimore in 1985.
- Associate Pastor at St. Anthony in Baltimore in 1985
- Associate pastor at St. Isaac Jogues in Baltimore in 1990
- Administrator of Holy Cross and St. Mary Star of the Sea in Baltimore in March 1993, before being appointed pastor there in October 1993
- Temporary administrator of Immaculate Conception in Towson in January 2000
- Temporary administrator of St. John the Evangelist in Severna Park, becoming pastor on November 28, 2000

=== Auxiliary Bishop of Baltimore ===
On July 3, 2004, Rozanski was appointed as an auxiliary bishop of Baltimore and titular bishop of Walla Walla by Pope John Paul II, becoming the youngest bishop in the United States at that time. He received his episcopal consecration at the Cathedral of Mary, Our Queen, on August 24, 2004, from Cardinal William Keeler, with Bishops William Newman and W. Francis Malooly serving as co-consecrators. Rozanski selected as his episcopal motto: "Serve The Lord With Gladness."

As an auxiliary bishop, Rozanski was appointed as vicar for Hispanic ministries. He also served as the Seton vicar, supervising parishes in Anne Arundel, Howard, Carroll, Frederick, Washington, Allegany, and Garrett Counties.

The United States Conference of Catholic Bishops (USCCB) announced on April 18, 2011, that Rozanski would succeed Bishop Edward U. Kmiec as co-chair of the Polish National Catholic-Roman Catholic dialogue. He was named to the post by Archbishop Wilton Gregory. On November 12, 2013, Rozanski was elected as chair of the USCCB Committee on Ecumenical and Interreligious Affairs.

=== Bishop of Springfield in Massachusetts ===
Coat of arms as bishop of Springfield

On June 19, 2014, Pope Francis named Rozanski the ninth bishop of the Diocese of Springfield in Massachusetts. He was installed on August 12, 2014.

In September 2018, a Diocesan Review Board notified Rozanski that it had found an allegation of sexual abuse by former Springfield Bishop Christopher Weldon to be credible. The board cited a Chicopee, Massachusetts resident who said that Weldon had abused him as a child. The board later split on the case, with several members saying that the victim did not name Weldon directly. Three other board members maintained they had witnessed otherwise. In June 2019, Rozanski met with the victim, saying he found the allegations "deeply troubling". In June 2020, an investigation by retired Superior Court Judge Peter A. Velis found the victim's claim "to be unequivocally credible."

After the Velis' findings were released, Rozanski asked Trinity Health of New England to remove Weldon's name from its rehabilitation center, the former Farren Memorial Hospital in Montague, Massachusetts. Weldon's remains were disinterred and moved to a more secluded spot in the cemetery. Rozanski ordered the removal of all photographs, memorials, and other mentions of Weldon from all diocesan facilities, schools, and churches.

In December 2019, Rozanski banned the Pioneer Valley Gay Men's Chorus from singing in a Christmas caroling concert at St. Theresa's of Lisieux Parish in South Hadley, Massachusetts.

In June 2020, Robert M. Hoatson, co-founder of Road to Recover Inc. for survivors of clerical sexual abuse, called on Rozanski to resign. Hoatson described Rozanski's handling of sexual abuse allegations against Weldon as “woefully deficient.” Hoatson also called on Pope Francis to rescind his appointment of Rozanski as archbishop of St. Louis.

=== Archbishop of St. Louis ===
On June 10, 2020, Francis appointed Rozanski as archbishop of St. Louis, following the retirement of Archbishop Robert Carlson. Rozanski was installed on August 25, 2020, at the Cathedral Basilica of St. Louis in St. Louis, Missouri.

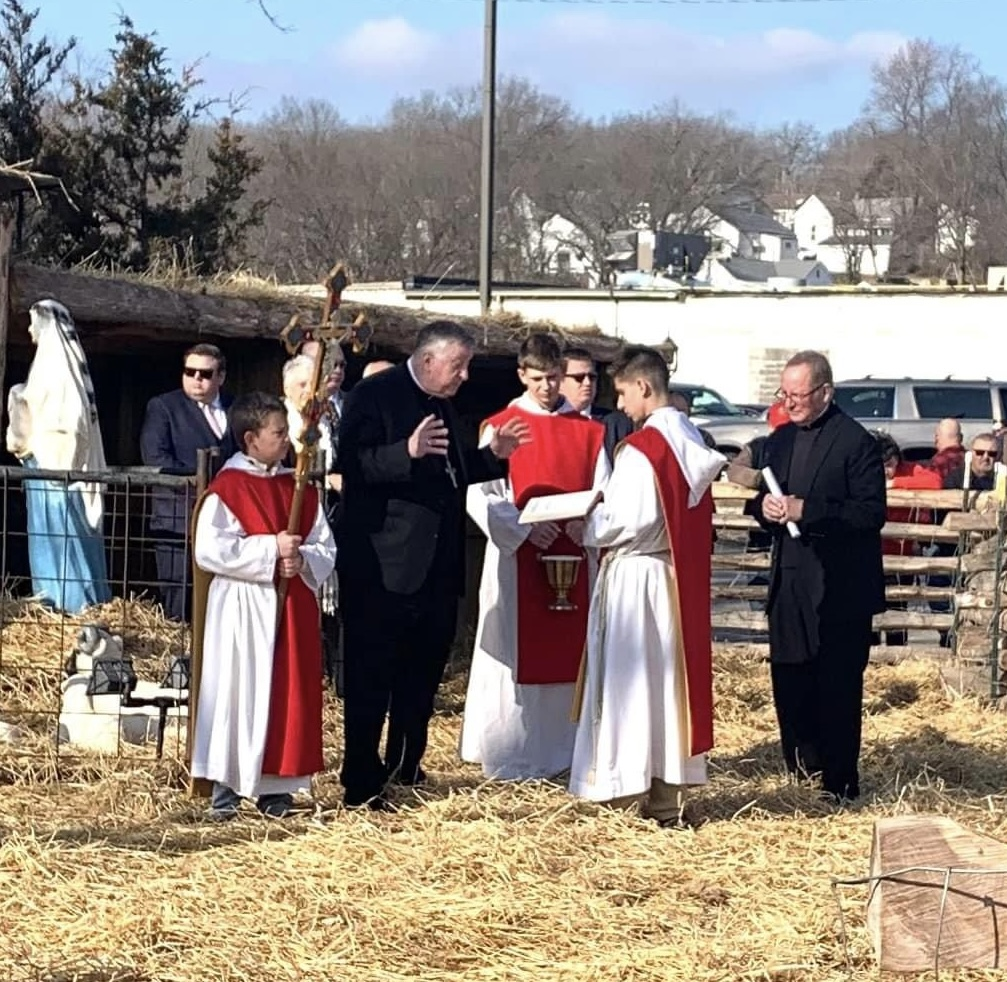
Archbishop Mitchell Rozanski blessing a live Nativity in De Soto, Missouri on December 19, 2021.

Ronzanki is the Grand Prior of the USA Northern Lieutenancy of the Equestrian Order of the Holy Sepulchre of Jerusalem.

In May 2023, Rozanski announced "All Things New", a plan to reduce the number of parishes in the archdiocese from 178 to 134 with closures and mergers. Seven parishes filed appeals in August 2023 with the Dicastery for the Clergy in Rome, which decided to accept appeals from two parishes. The Dicastery rejected the appeals from the two parishes a year later.

In January 2026, Rozanski "blindsided" the Catholic community with the closure of another Catholic school. South City Catholic Academy had continuously been a feeder to the Catholic high schools. As part of the "All Things New" plan, it was outlined that the school was safe from closure until 2028. The school board, teachers, staff, and parents were stunned by the decision.

== See also ==
- Catholic Church hierarchy
- Catholic Church in the United States
- Historical list of the Catholic bishops of the United States
- List of Catholic bishops of the United States
- Lists of patriarchs, archbishops, and bishops

Catholic Church titles
Preceded by Robert James Carlson	Archbishop of Saint Louis; 2020–Present	Succeeded by Incumbent
Preceded by Timothy A. McDonnell	Bishop of Springfield in Massachusetts; 2014–2020	Succeeded by William Draper Byrne
Preceded by -	Auxiliary Bishop of Baltimore; 2004–2014	Succeeded by -
