= Edward Paquette =

American former Catholic priest (born 1928)

- Born: 1928 (age 97–98)
- Occupation: Priest
- Years active: 1957–1990s
- Known for: Clerical child sexual abuse scandals

Edward O. Paquette Jr. (born 1928) is an American former Catholic priest who was defrocked for sexually abusing multiple children within several U.S. dioceses.

== Career ==
He was ordained in 1957.

== Sexual abuse ==
=== Abuse in Fall River ===
Paquette was ousted from the Diocese of Fall River and stripped of his priestly faculties in 1963 after accusations of "improper behavior" with young boys. He resurfaced a year later as a priest in Indiana and then in Vermont.

=== Abuse in Springfield, Massachusetts ===
Although he established the Diocesan Misconduct Commission in response to sexual abuse among the clergy, bishop John Aloysius Marshall accepted Paquette despite the repeated allegations of child molestation against him. Marshall even said that he was "determined to take the risk of leaving [Paquette] in his present assignment" despite "the demands of...irate parents that 'something be done about this.'"

=== Abuse in Fort Wayne-South Bend ===
A lawsuit filed in 2006 alleged that Paquette molested boys in Indiana parishes affiliated to the Diocese of Fort Wayne-South Bend.

=== Abuse in Burlington ===
Paquette was accused in 23 lawsuits of molesting altar boys in Vermont during the 1970s. He abused several children there while John Aloysius Marshall was bishop.

== Laicization and retirement ==
Paquette was later removed from the priesthood several decades later on the order of Pope Benedict XVI. He apologized in 2009 for the crimes he had committed against his victims and their families.
