= Diocese of Springfield in Massachusetts =

Latin Catholic ecclesiastical jurisdiction in Massachusetts, United States

Diocese of Springfield in Massachusetts Diœcesis Campifontis

Catholic
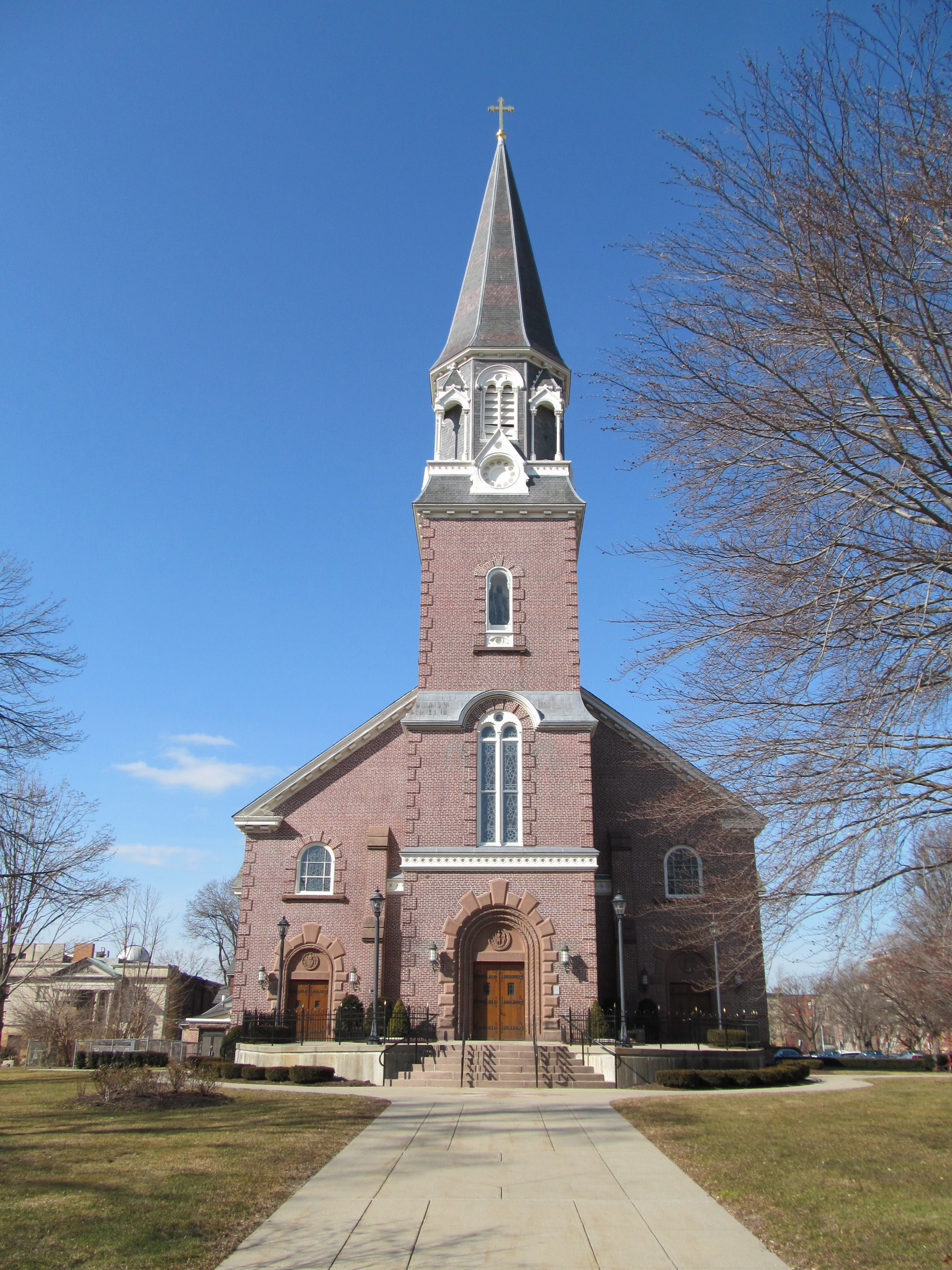
- St. Michael's Cathedral

- Coat of arms

Location
- Country: United States
- Territory: Western Massachusetts
- Ecclesiastical province: Boston
- Metropolitan: Boston
- Coordinates: 42°06′19″N 72°35′07″W

Statistics
- Area: 2,822 sq mi (7,310 km^{2})
- Population: Total; Catholics: (as of 2023); ▲828,249; ▼156,210 (▼18.9%)
- Parishes: ▼76

Information
- Denomination: Catholic
- Sui iuris church: Latin Church
- Rite: Roman Rite
- Established: June 14, 1870 (156 years ago)
- Cathedral: St. Michael's Cathedral
- Patron saint: Saint Michael
- Secular priests: 114, plus 41 religious priests and 100 permanent deacons

Current leadership
- Pope: Leo XIV
- Bishop: William Draper Byrne
- Metropolitan Archbishop: Richard Henning

Map
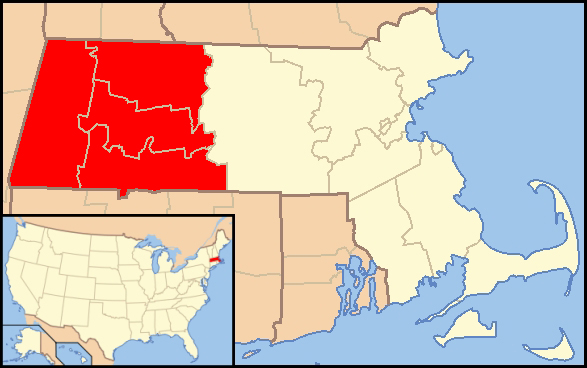

Website
- www.diospringfield.org

The Diocese of Springfield in Massachusetts (Latin: Diœcesis Campifontis) is a diocese of the Catholic Church in Western Massachusetts in the United States. It is a suffragan diocese of the Archdiocese of Boston. The mother church is St. Michael's Cathedral in Springfield. The bishop is William Draper Byrne.

== Territory ==
The Diocese of Springfield in Massachusetts comprises Berkshire, Franklin, Hampshire and Hampden Counties.

== History ==
=== 1700 to 1870 ===
During the 17th and early 18th centuries, the British Province of Massachusetts Bay, which included present-day Springfield, enacted laws prohibiting the practice of Catholicism in the colony. It was even illegal for a priest to reside there.

With the start of the American Revolutionary War in 1776, attitudes towards Catholics shifted in the American colonies. The rebel leaders needed to gain the support of Catholics for their cause. In addition, the alliance with Catholic France fostered a more favorable attitude among Americans towards Catholicism. The Constitution of the new Commonwealth of Massachusetts, written by future US President John Adams and ratified in 1780, established religious freedom for Catholics in the new state. With the Massachusetts constitution being the first state constitution in the United States, its framework of government became a model for the constitutions of other states and, eventually, for the federal constitution.

After the Revolution ended in 1783, Pope Pius VI moved to remove American Catholics from the jurisdiction of the Diocese of London. He erected in 1784 the Prefecture Apostolic of the United States, encompassing the entire territory of the new nation. Pius VI created the Diocese of Baltimore, the first diocese in the United States, to replace the prefecture apostolic in 1789.

Pope Pius VII erected the Diocese of Boston in 1808, removing all of New England from the Diocese of Baltimore. The Western Massachusetts region would remain part of the Diocese of Boston for the next 62 years. In 1830, St. Joseph's Church was founded in Springfield; it was the first Catholic church in western Massachusetts. The first Catholic church in Chicopee was St. Matthew's, constructed in 1838. St. Joseph Parish was established in 1849, the first parish in Pittsfield.In Holyoke, St. Jerome Parish was erected in 1854, the first parish in that community.

=== 1870 to 1920 ===
On June 14, 1870, Pope Pius IX erected the Diocese of Springfield. He removed Berkshire, Franklin, Hampden, Hampshire, and Worcester counties from the Diocese of Boston, making the new diocese a suffragan of the Archdiocese of New York. Pius IX appointed Patrick O'Reilly from the Diocese of Boston as the first bishop of the new diocese.

During O'Reilly's time as bishop, the Catholic population of the diocese increased from 90,000 to 200,000; its priests from 43 to 196; its religious women from 12 to 321. O'Reilly laid the cornerstones of nearly 100 churches, schools and other buildings. In 1873, the Sisters of Charity of the House of Providence established the House of Providence Hospital in Holyoke. O'Reilly opened orphanages in Holyoke and Worcester. O'Reilly persuaded the Sisters of Charity and the Sisters of Notre Dame de Namur to set up congregations in the diocese. The Sisters of Providence in 1874 opened the House of Mercy Hospital in Springfield. Today it is Mercy Medical Center.

In 1875, Pius IX elevated the Diocese of Boston to the Archdiocese of Boston. He transferred the Diocese of Springfield from the Archdiocese of New York to the new archdiocese. In 1883, O'Reilly established Cathedral High School in Springfield, with nuns from the Sisters of St. Joseph in New York City providing the faculty. O’Reilly died on May 28, 1892. Pope Leo XIII appointed Thomas Beaven as O'Reilly's replacement.

In addition to French and Irish parishes, Beaven established churches in the diocese for Polish, Italian, Lithuanian, Slovakian and Maronite Rite Catholics. In 1892, Beaven purchased a farm in Holyoke to become the Holy Family Institute at Brightside, a boys orphanage and school.

During his tenure, the Sisters of Providence opened the Beaven-Kelly Home for senior men; a home for abandoned infants; a House of the Good Shepherd at Springfield; and several residences for single working women. In 1897, the Sisters of St. Joseph moved into Mont Marie, their new motherhouse in Springfield. The Sisters of Providence in 1900 opened Farren Memorial Hospital in Montague, named after the industrialist Bernard N. Farren. Beaven died in 1920.

=== 1920 to 1950 ===
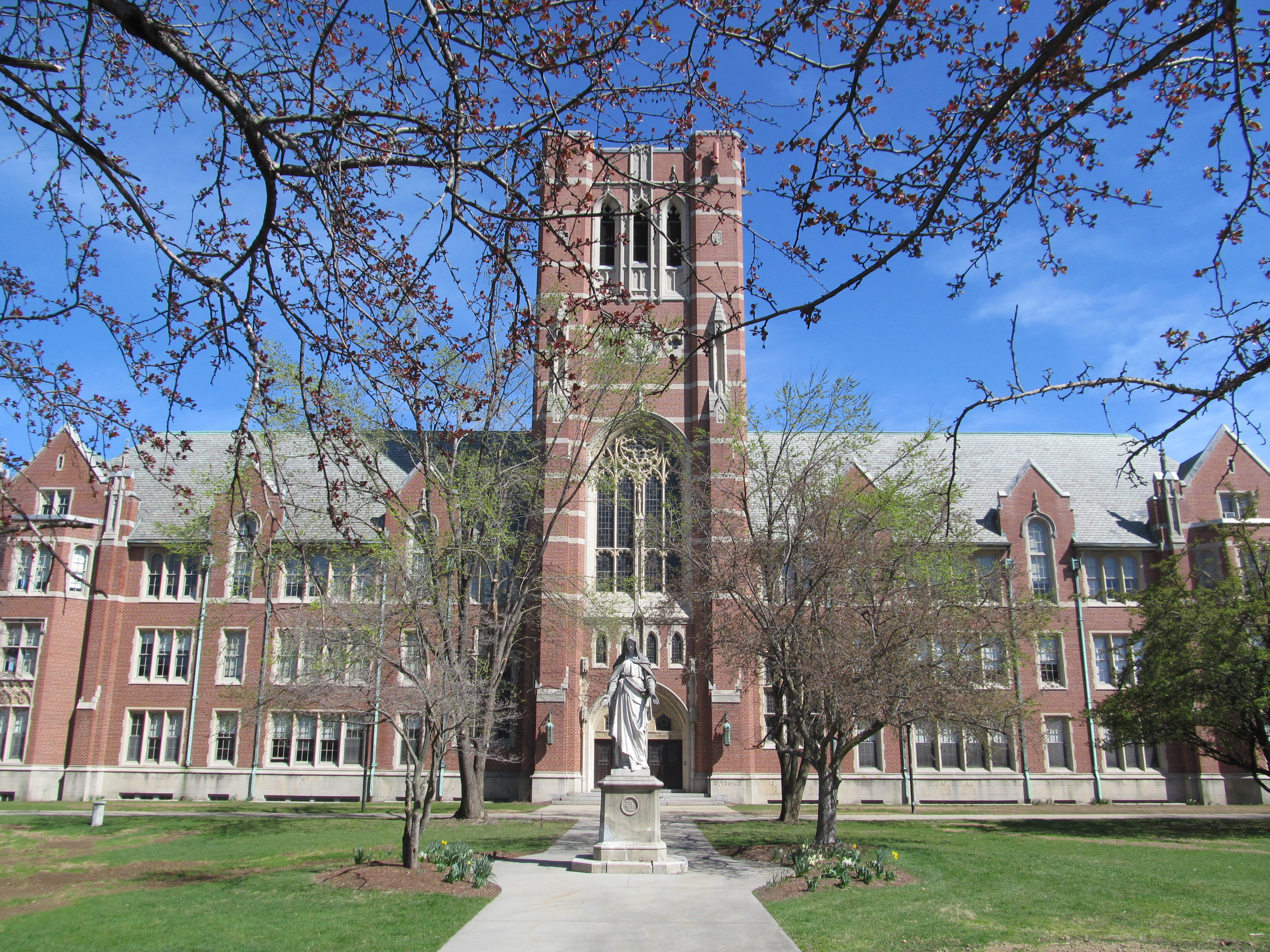
Elms College, Chicopee, Massachusetts (2012)

In 1921, Thomas O'Leary was made the new bishop of Springfield. During his tenure, he introduced the Passionists to the diocese and opened 24 new parishes. Pope Pius XI in October 1923 renamed the Diocese of Springfield as the Diocese of Springfield in Massachusetts. This was to avoid confusion with the newly erected Diocese of Springfield in Illinois. St. Luke's Hospital in Pittsfield was opened by the Sisters of Providence in 1926.Today it is Berkshire Medical Center.

In 1928, O'Leary began planning the new Our Lady of the Elms College in Chicopee to be first Catholic college for women in western Massachusetts. O'Leary died in 1949.

When Pope Pius XII erected the Diocese of Worcester in January 1950, he removed Worcester County from the Diocese of Springfield in Massachusetts. This action established the present territory of the Diocese of Springfield in Massachusetts. That same month, Pius XII appointed Christopher Weldon of New York as its new bishop.

=== 1950 to 2004 ===
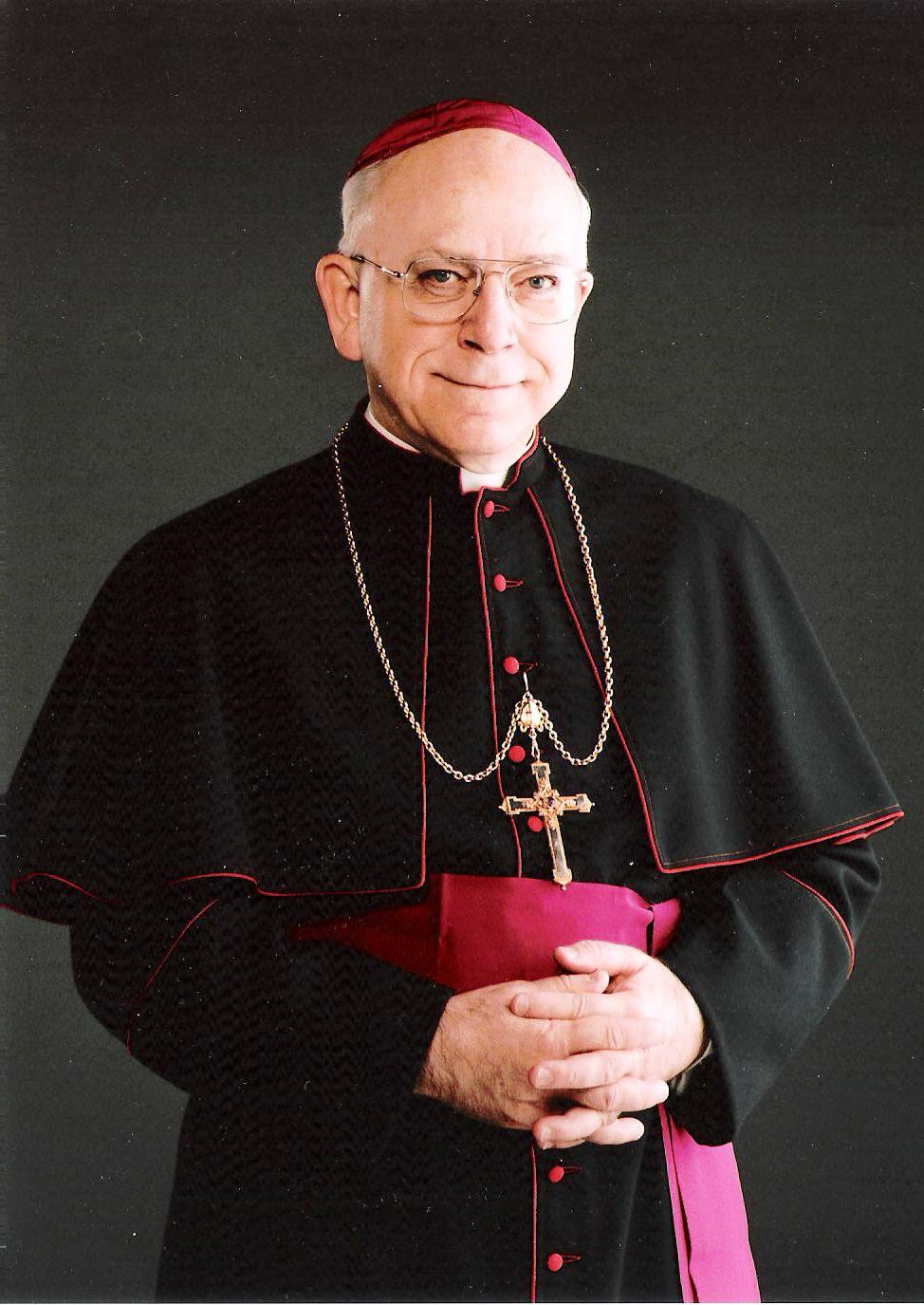
Bishop Dupre (1990)

During his tenure, Weldon oversaw the construction of Our Lady of Lourdes School in Springfield. The Sisters of Providence added a wing to Farren Memorial Hospital. Weldon erected ten new parishes, and constructed 11 new churches and several parish centers. He established a center for the Hispanic apostolate in Springfield, and a diocesan newspaper in 1954. Auxiliary Bishop Joseph Maguire of Boston was named coadjutor bishop in 1976.

When Weldon retired in 1977, Maguire automatically succeeded him as the next bishop. As bishop, Maguire created a program to train permanent deacons for parish service. He also established the Apostolate for Black Catholics. He recruited 300 lay members from the diocese to visit the sick and disabled at home or in institutions. Maguire retired as bishop of Springfield in 1991.

Pope John Paul II named Bishop John Marshall from the Diocese of Burlington as the sixth bishop of Springfield in Massachusetts in 1992. Marshall died two years later; the pope then appointed Auxiliary Bishop Thomas Dupré in 1995 as the next bishop of the diocese. He retired as bishop of Springfield in 2004.

=== 2004 to present ===
In 2004, John Paul II named Auxiliary Bishop Timothy A. McDonnell of New York as the eighth bishop of Springfield in Massachusetts.

By 2010, 65 churches had been closed, with 13 of those buildings housing new congregations created by mergers. McDonnell was responsible for the majority of these parish closures. He retired as bishop of Springfield in 2014.Auxiliary Bishop Mitchell T. Rozanski of Baltimore was the next bishop of Springfield in Massachusetts, taking office in 2014.

In December 2019, Rozanski banned the Pioneer Valley Gay Men's Chorus from singing in a Christmas caroling concert at St. Theresa's of Lisieux Parish in South Hadley. Francis appointed Rozanski as archbishop of the Archdiocese of St. Louis in 2020. William Draper Byrne replaced Rozanski.

=== Sexual abuse ===
In February 2019, a news report stated that diocese had received 15 complaints of sexual abuse in 2018. On May 27, 2020, the diocese formed an independent task force to advise the bishop on allegations of sexual abuse.

== Bishops ==
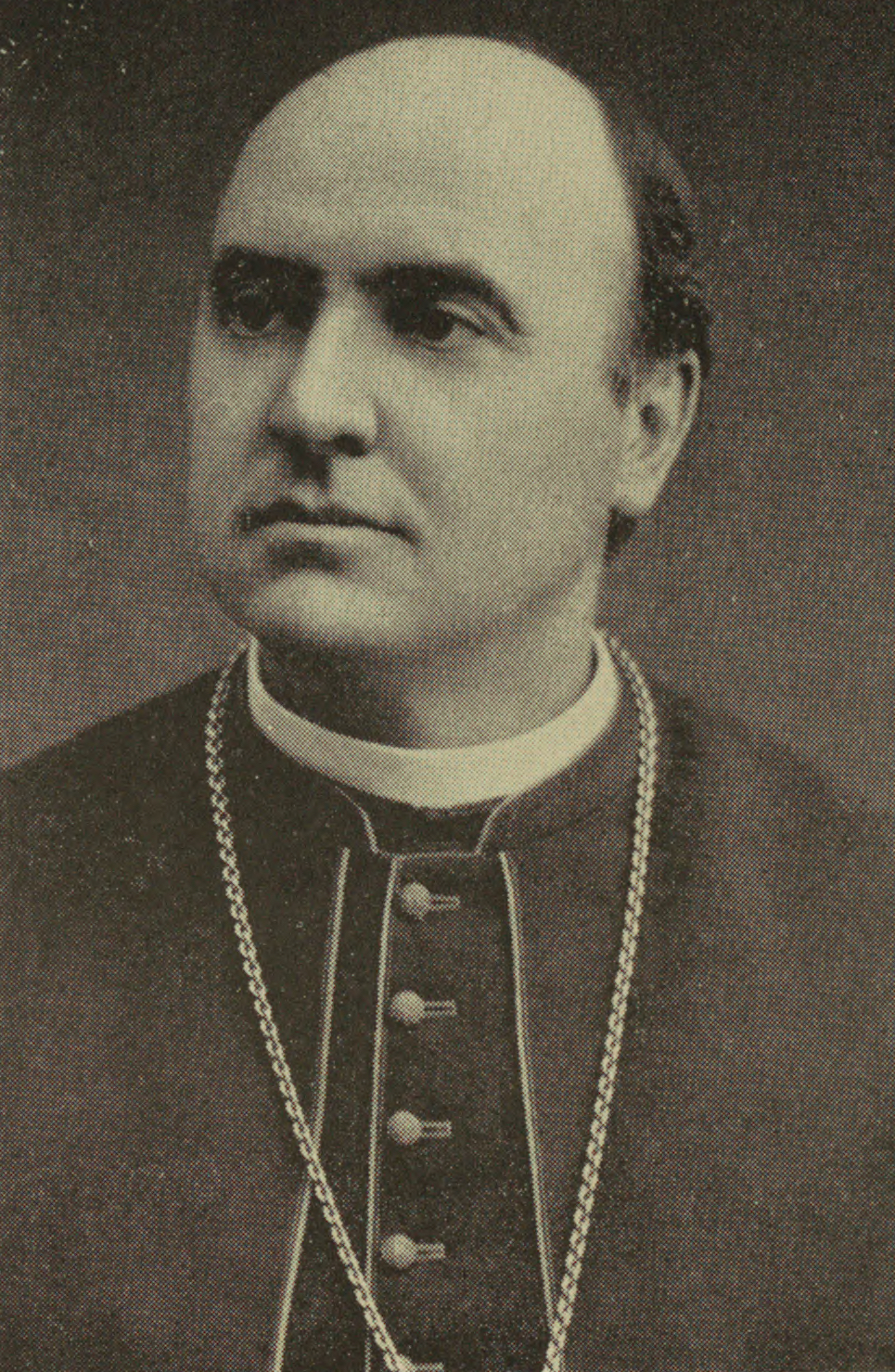
Bishop Beaven (1903)

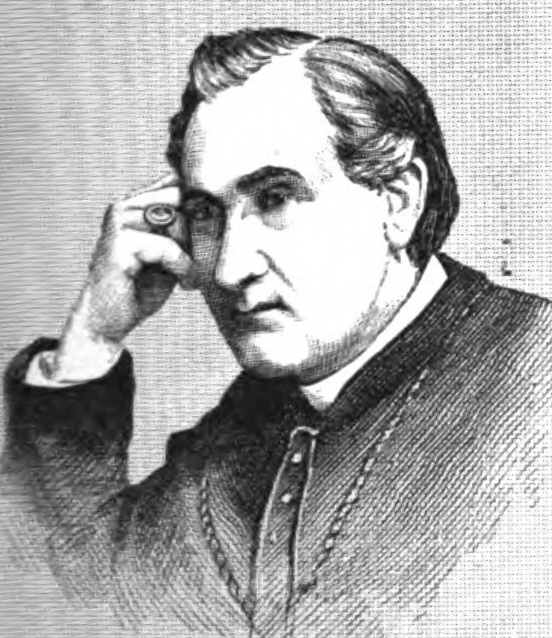
Bishop O'Reilly (pre-1886)

=== Bishops of Springfield (1870 to 1923) ===
1. Patrick Thomas O'Reilly (1870–1892)
2. Thomas Daniel Beaven (1892–1920)
3. Thomas Michael O'Leary (1921–1949)

=== Bishops of Springfield in Massachusetts (1923 to present) ===
1. Thomas Michael O'Leary (1921–1949)
2. Christopher Joseph Weldon (1950–1977)
3. Joseph Francis Maguire (1977–1992; coadjutor bishop 1976–1977)
4. John Aloysius Marshall (1992–1994)
5. Thomas Ludger Dupré (1995–2004)
6. Timothy Anthony McDonnell (2004–2014)
7. Mitchell Thomas Rozanski (2014–2020), appointed Archbishop of St. Louis
8. William Draper Byrne (2020–present)

=== Auxiliary bishops ===
- Leo Edward O'Neil (1980–1989), appointed Coadjutor Bishop of Manchester and subsequently succeeded to that see
- Thomas Ludger Dupré (1990–1995), appointed Bishop of Springfield in Massachusetts (see above)

=== Other diocesan priests who became bishops ===
- Daniel Francis Feehan, appointed Bishop of Fall River in 1907
- Joseph John Rice, appointed Bishop of Burlington in 1910
- Joseph Francis McGrath, appointed Bishop of Baker City in 1918
- William Augustine Hickey, appointed Coadjutor Bishop of Providence in 1919 and subsequently succeeded to that see
- Timothy Joseph Harrington, appointed Auxiliary Bishop of Worcester in 1968

=== Office of Safe Environment and Victim Assistance ===
- Jeffrey Trant (appointed 2019, resigned in 2022)
- Norman Charest (interim 2022–2023)
- Michael Collins (appointed 2023)

== Significant church buildings ==
The Basilica of St. Stanislaus in Chicopee is located within the Diocese of Springfield.

== Education ==
=== High schools ===
- Pope Francis Preparatory School – Springfield
- Saint Mary High School – Westfield

=== Closed schools ===
- Cathedral High School – Springfield (merged with Holyoke Catholic High School to create Pope Francis Preparatory School)
- Holyoke Catholic High School – Chicopee
- St. Joseph Central High School – Pittsfield (closed 2017)

== See also ==
- Catholic Church by country
- Catholic Church in the United States
- List of Catholic archdioceses
- List of Catholic dioceses
- Ecclesiastical Province of Boston
- Sexual abuse scandal in Springfield in Massachusetts diocese
