= St. Michael's Cathedral (Springfield, Massachusetts) =

Historic church in Massachusetts, United States

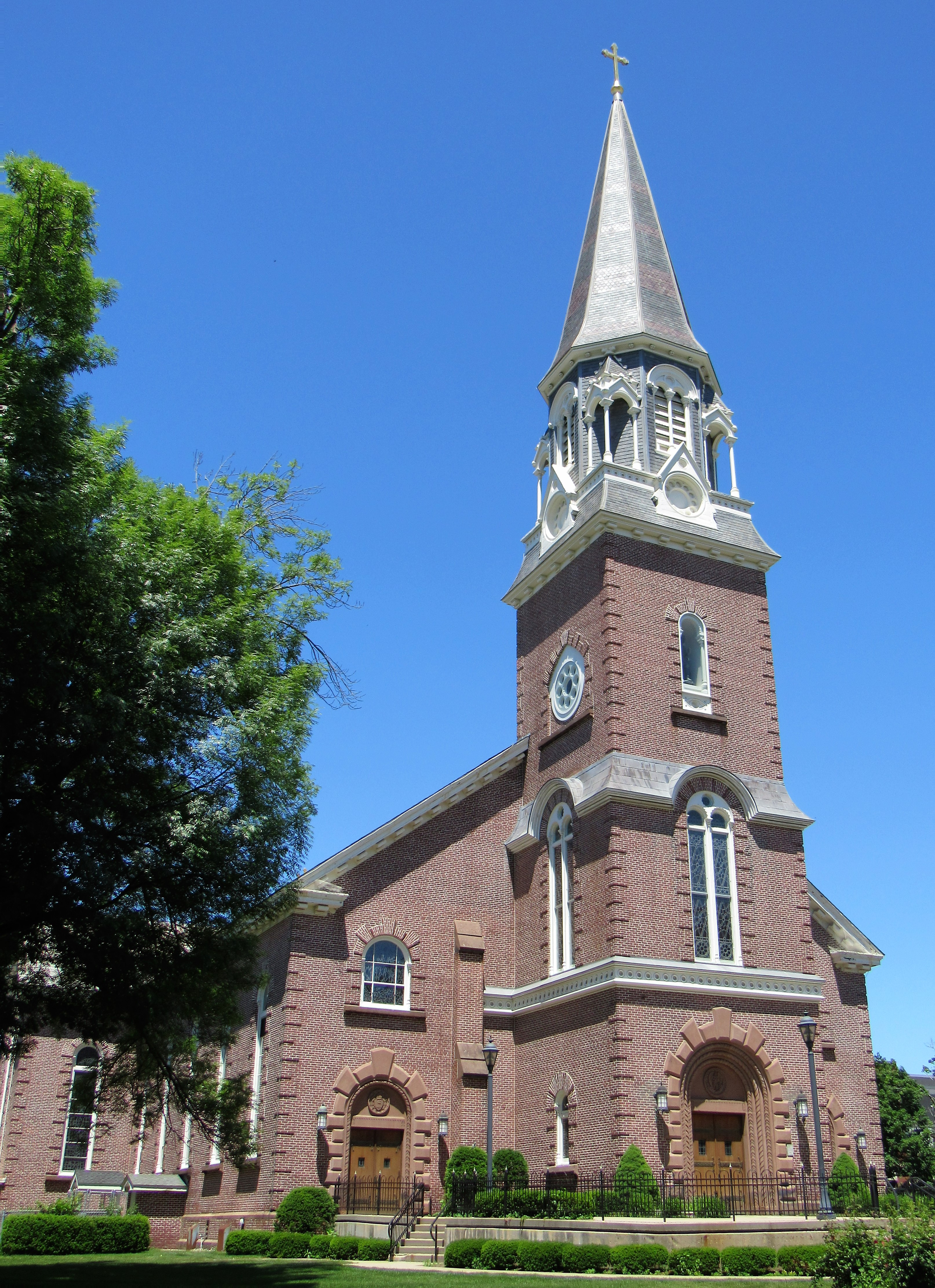

- Location within Massachusetts
- 42°6′15.1″N 72°35′4.1″W
- Location: 254 State Street; Springfield, Massachusetts
- Country: United States
- Denomination: Roman Catholic
- Website: stmichaelscathedralspfld.org

History
- Status: Cathedral
- Founded: 1847
- Dedication: Saint Michael the Archangel

Architecture
- Architect: Patrick Keely
- Style: Italianate, Federal
- Groundbreaking: 1860
- Completed: 1861

Specifications
- Materials: Brick

Administration
- Diocese: Springfield

Clergy
- Bishop: Most Rev. William Draper Byrne
- Rector: Most Rev. Gary Dailey
- St. Michael's Cathedral
- U.S. Historic district – Contributing property
- Part of: Quadrangle–Mattoon Street Historic District (ID74000371)
- Added to NRHP: May 8, 1974

St. Michael's Cathedral is the mother church of the Diocese of Springfield in Massachusetts in the United States, constructed in 1861. In 1974, the cathedral and rectory were included as contributing properties in the Quadrangle–Mattoon Street Historic District, listed on the National Register of Historic Places.

== History ==
=== St. Michael's Church ===
During the middle 1840's, the Catholics in Springfield did not have a church. In 1847, a group of them purchased a former Baptist church in the town. It was dedicated that same year as St. Benedict's Parish, in honor of Archbishop Benedict Fenwick of Boston.

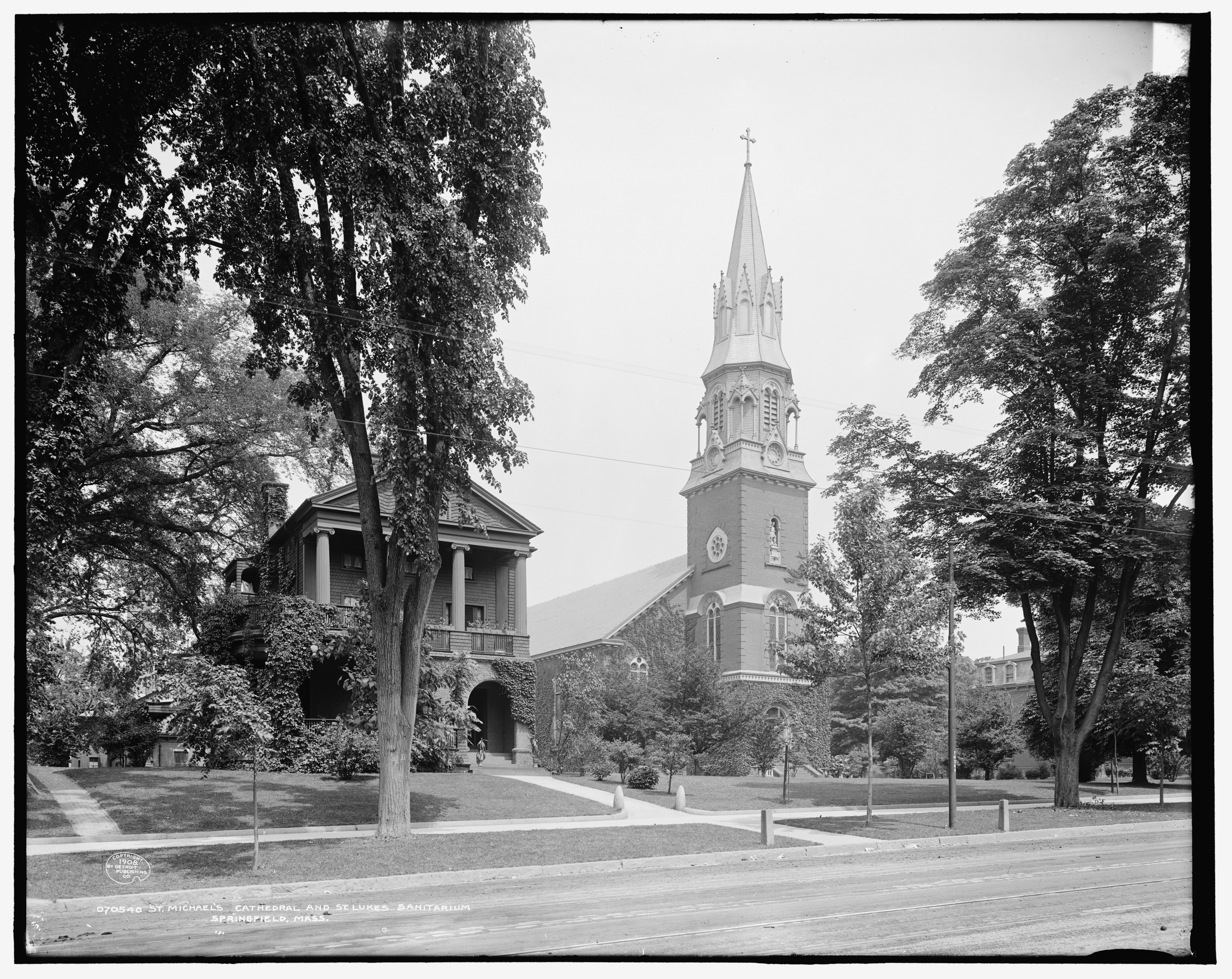
St. Michael's Cathedral (1908)

In 1852, the Archdiocese of Boston assigned Reverend Michael P. Gallagher as pastor of St. Benedict's. He soon realized that the parish was outgrowing its church. Gallagher purchased a property on State Street in Springfield and began building a new church. In honor of his work, the diocese decided to rename the parish and new church as St. Michaels.

The cornerstone for St. Michael's was laid in 1860, and completed in 1861. It was based on plans from the Brooklyn architect Patrick Keely, who had designed many churches in the United States. St. Michael's Church was dedicated in 1861 When Gallagher died in 1869, he was buried at the church entrance.

=== St. Michael's Cathedral ===
When Pope Pius IX established the present Diocese of Springfield in Massachusetts in 1870, St. Michael's church became St. Michael's Cathedral. In 1881, the Sisters of St. Joseph opened the St. Michael’s Cathedral Grammar School. A convent for the sisters was built by the diocese in 1883. In 1884, the sisters opened the Cathedral High School in the cathedral itself.

In 1997, St. Michael's underwent a renovation, with the addition of the Bishop Marshall Center at the rear of the church.

== Cathedral ==
=== Exterior ===
When it was constructed in 1861, St. Michael's Cathedral was 215 feet (66 m). with the addition of the Bishop Marshall Center in 1996, it is now 305 feet (93 m) long. The Knight’s Tower is 120 feet (37 m). It contains the Hooper Bell which was crafted by the son-in-law of the silversmith Paul Revere. An illuminated statue of St. Michael the Archangel sits in the tower.

=== Interior ===
The Holy Spirit Chapel in the cathedral displays a mosaic of the Burning Bush from the Book of Exodus in the Old Testament. It was created by the D’Ambrosio Ecclesiastical Art Studios in New York City. The tabernacle is housed in this chapel, along with statues of St. Joseph and the Virgin Mary from the former Holy Name of Jesus Church in Chicopee, Massachusetts.

== Bishop Marshall Center ==
The Bishop Marshall Center is located at the rear of the cathedral. It includes the Holy Spirit Chapel and the St. Augustine’s Chapel, a mortuary chapel for the deceased bishops of the diocese.The center also has a choir room and a control room for Catholic Communications. The stained glass windows in the center came from the former Holy Family Church in Springfield.

== Music ministry ==
St. Michael's Cathedral sponsors three choirs:

- Cathedral Choir of Boys and Adults
- Holy Family Gospel Choir
- Latino Chorus
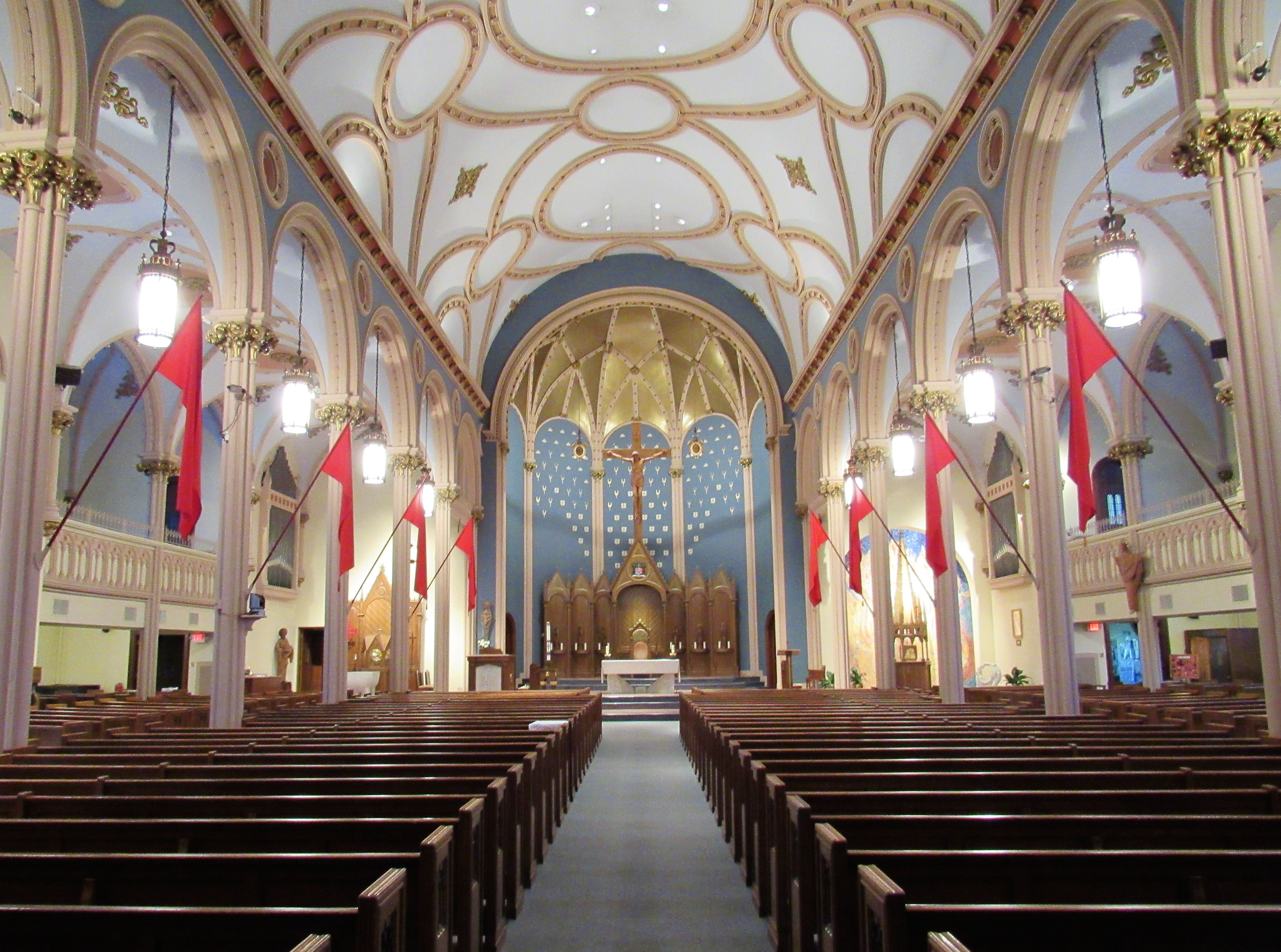
Nave looking toward the sanctuary

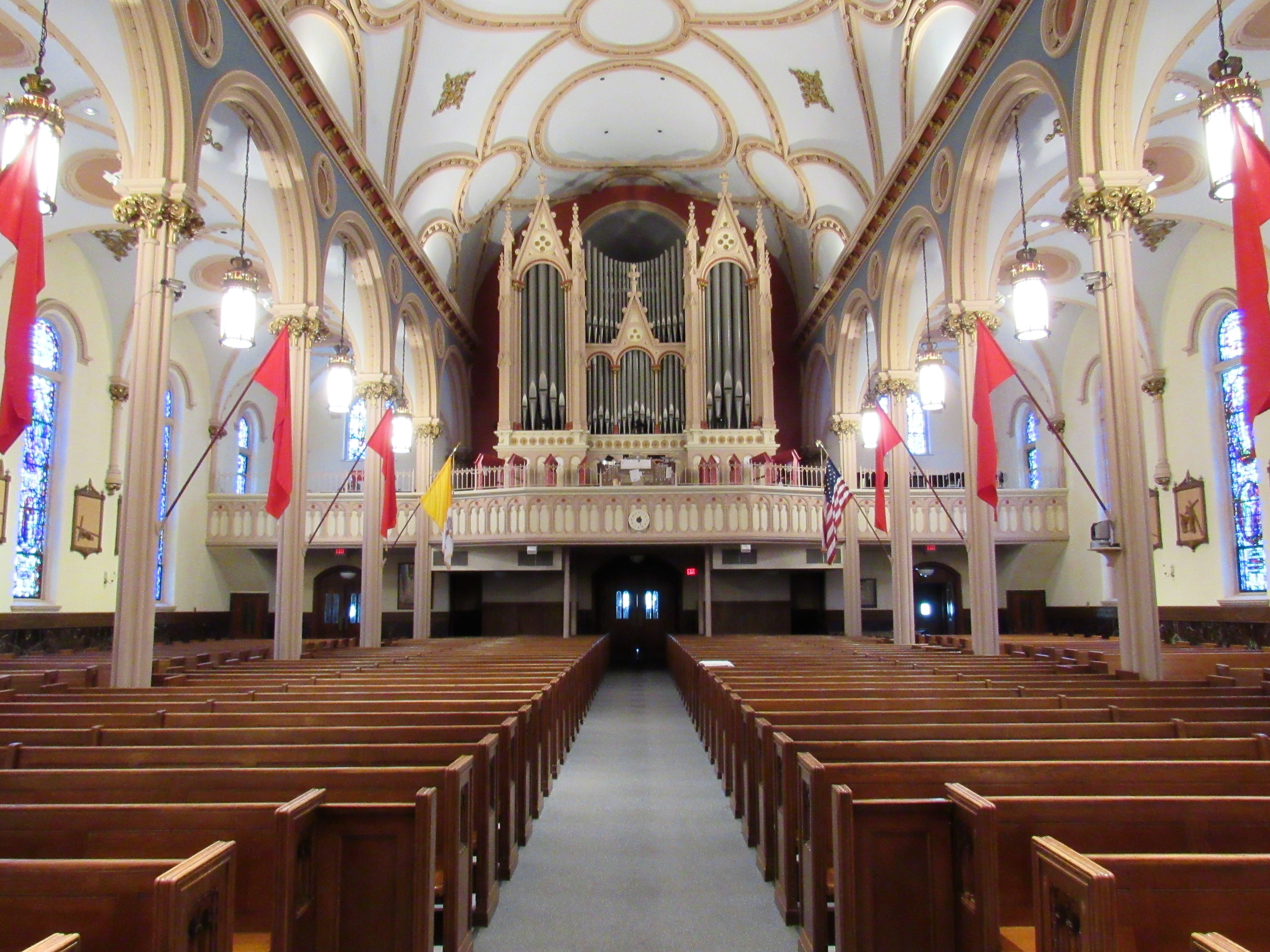
Nave looking toward the gallery

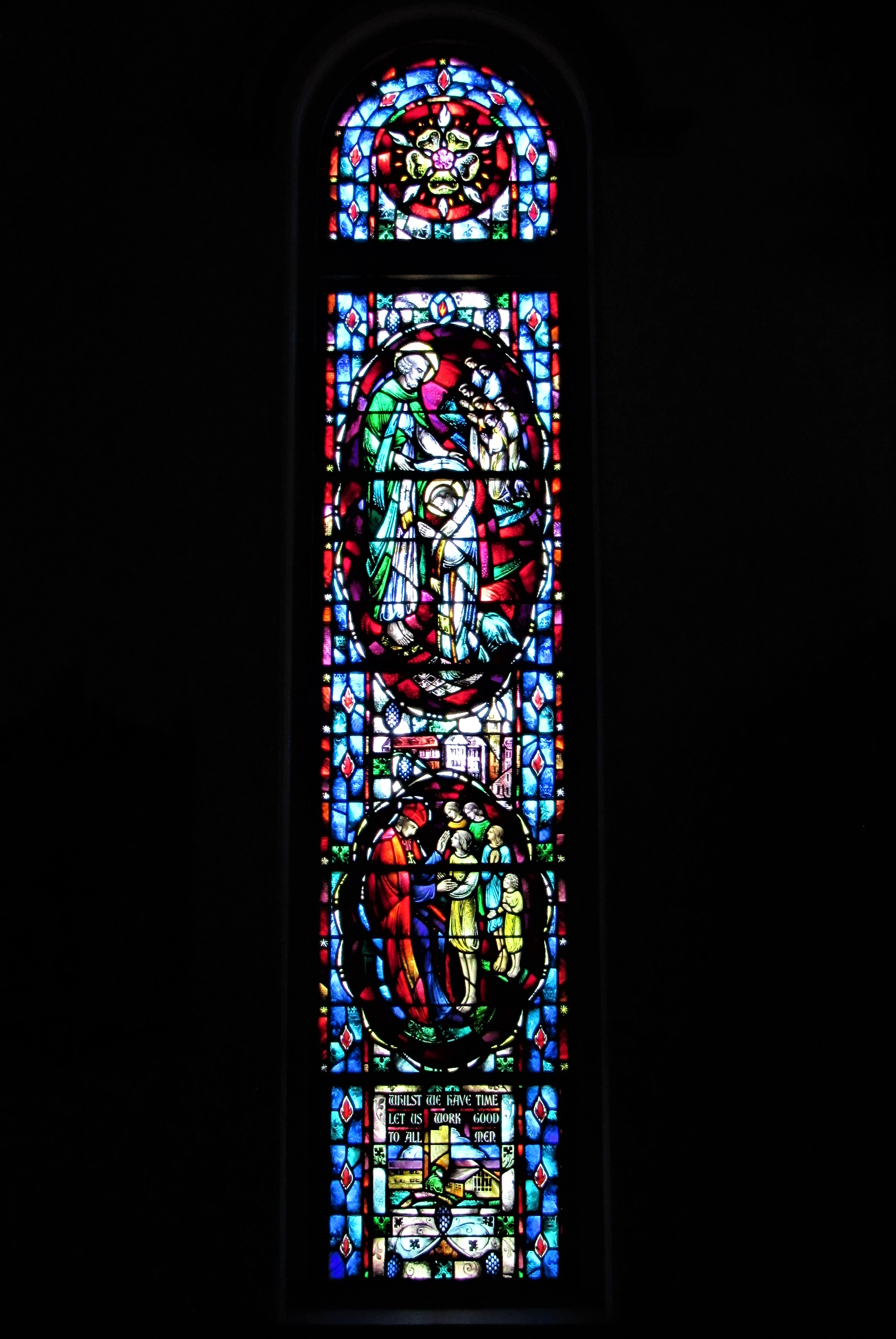
Stained glass window

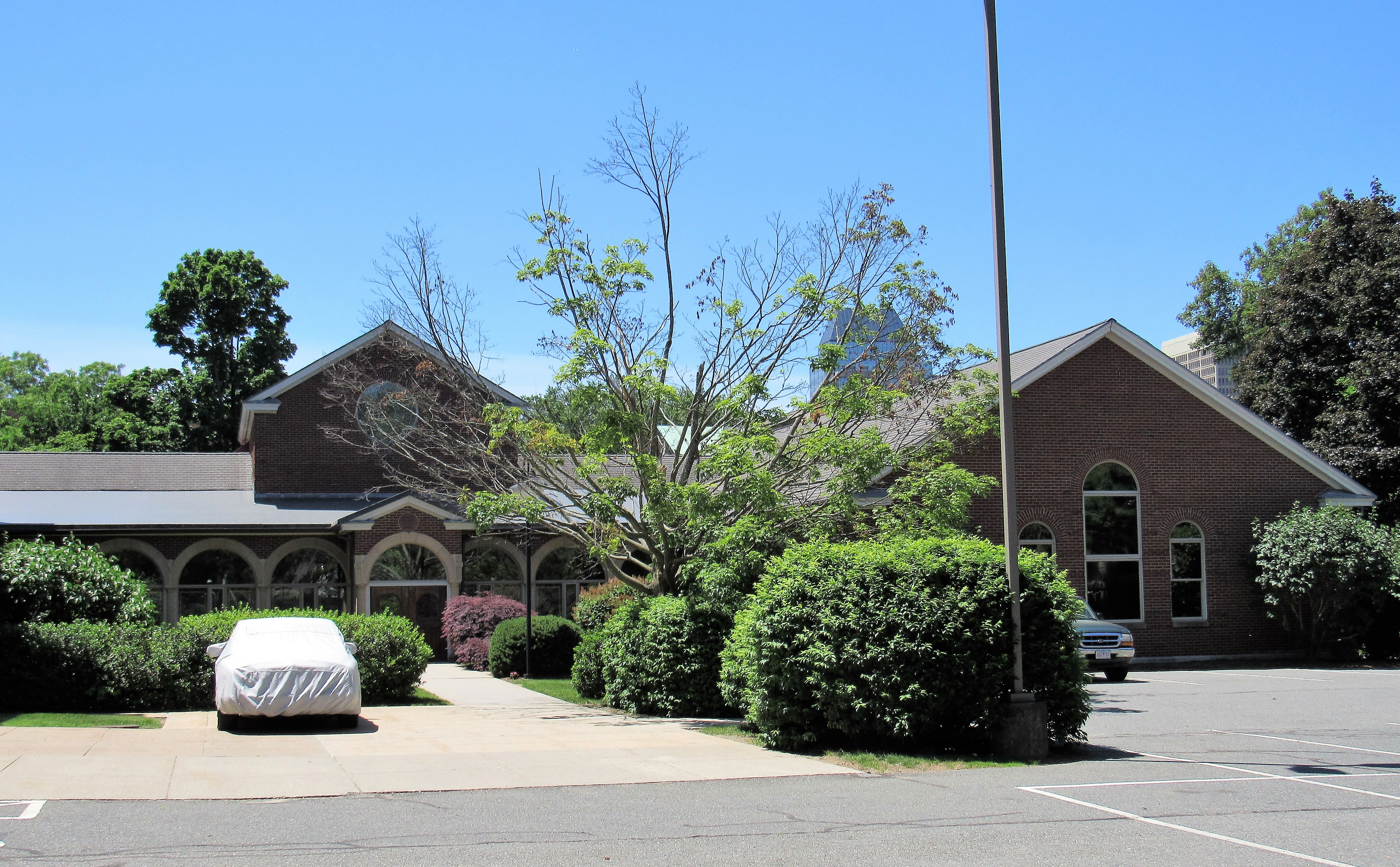
Bishop Marshall Center

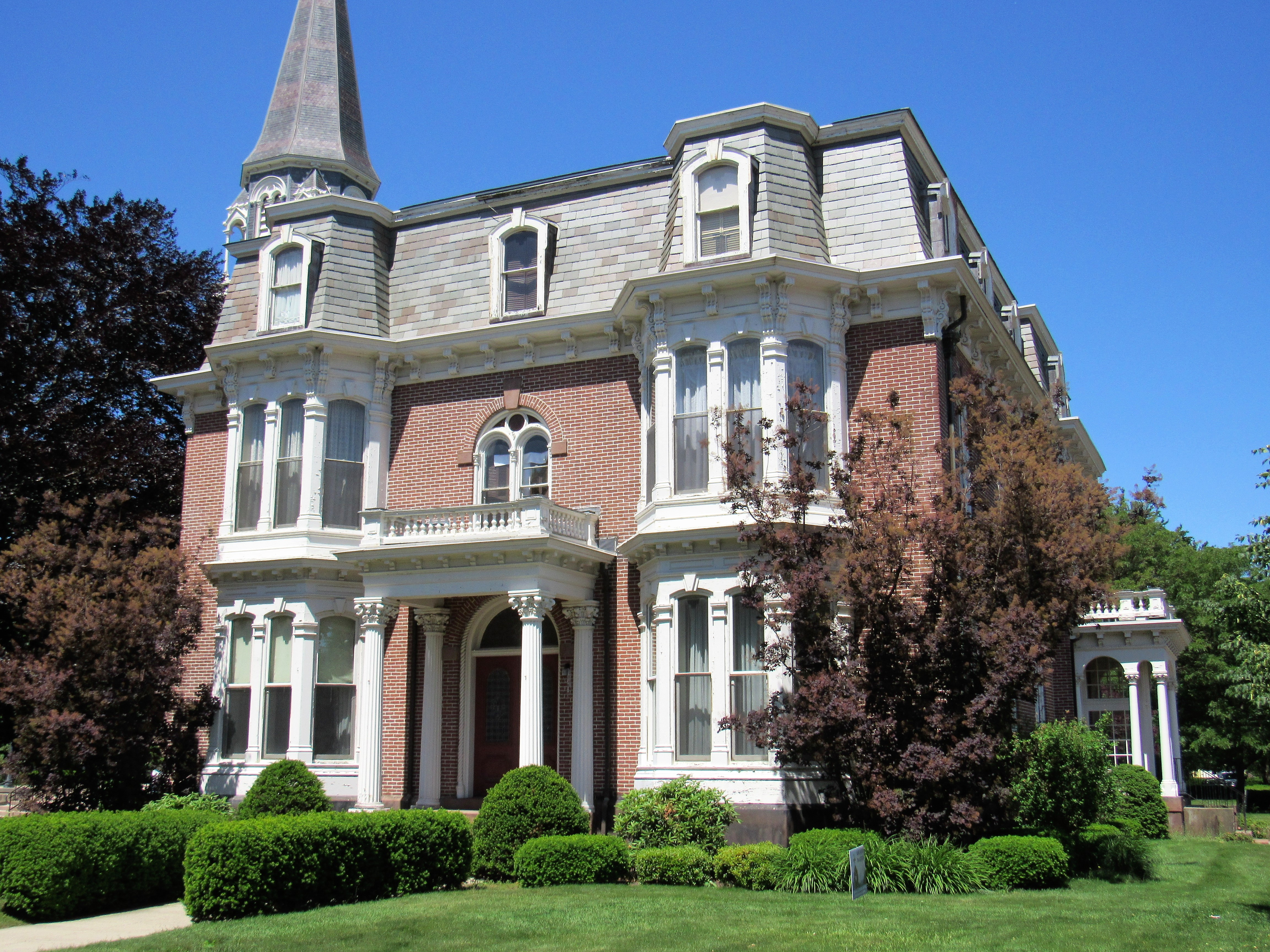
Rectory

== See also ==
- List of Catholic cathedrals in the United States
- List of cathedrals in the United States
- Saint Michael: Roman Catholic traditions and views
