= Vincent Joseph Hines =

American prelate

His Excellency, The Most Reverend Vincent Joseph Hines
- Bishop of Norwich
- Church: Roman Catholic
- Diocese: Diocese of Norwich
- Appointed: November 27, 1959
- Installed: March 17, 1960
- Term ended: June 5, 1975
- Predecessor: Bernard Joseph Flanagan
- Successor: Daniel Patrick Reilly

Orders
- Ordination: May 2, 1937 by Jean Verdier
- Consecration: March 17, 1960 by Henry Joseph O'Brien, Bernard Joseph Flanagan, and John Francis Hackett

Personal details
- Born: September 14, 1912 New Haven, Connecticut, US
- Died: April 23, 1990 (aged 77) Hartford, Connecticut, US
- Motto: In love and patience

Styles of Vincent Joseph Hines
- Reference style: His Excellency; The Most Reverend
- Spoken style: Your Excellency
- Religious style: Bishop

Vincent Joseph Hines (September 14, 1912 – April 23, 1990) was an American prelate of the Roman Catholic Church who served as bishop of the Diocese of Norwich in Connecticut from 1960 to 1975.

== Biography ==
Vincent Hines was born on September 14, 1912, in New Haven, Connecticut. He was ordained to the priesthood at the Saint Sulpice Seminary in Issy-les-Moulineaux, France, for the Archdiocese of Hartford on May 2, 1937, by Cardinal Jean Verdier. After the American entry into World War II in 1941, Hines joined the US Army Chaplain Corps in 1942. He served in France after the 1944 Normandy invasion; Hines received a Bronze Star medal.

=== Bishop of Norwich ===
On November 27, 1959, Hines was appointed the second bishop of Norwich by Pope John XXIII. He received his episcopal consecration on March 17, 1960, from Archbishop Henry O'Brien, with Bishops Bernard Flanagan and John Hackett serving as co-consecrators.

During his tenure, Hines led a $1 million fundraising campaign for the diocesan schools. He built Xavier High School for boys in Middletown, Connecticut, in 1963 and Mercy High School for girls, also in Middletown, in 1965. Hines also named the first religious sister to head a diocesan school system in Connecticut, and established a retirement program for priests. Hines attended the Second Vatican Council in Rome from 1962 to 1965.

=== Retirement and death ===
On June 5, 1975, Pope Paul VI accepted Hines' resignation as bishop of Norwich. He spent his retirement serving as chaplain to the School Sisters of Notre Dame in Norwich. Vincent Hines died in Hartford at St. Francis Hospital and Medical Center on April 23, 1990, at age 77.

== See also ==
- Catholic Church hierarchy
- Catholic Church in the United States
- Historical list of the Catholic bishops of the United States
- List of Catholic bishops of the United States
- Lists of patriarchs, archbishops, and bishops

Catholic Church titles
| Preceded by Bernard Joseph Flanagan | Bishop of Norwich; 1960–1975 | Succeeded by Daniel Patrick Reilly |
