= Daniel Patrick Reilly =

American Catholic prelate (1928–2024)

His Excellency, The Most Reverend Daniel Patrick Reilly
- Bishop of Worcester
- Church: Catholic Church
- Metropolis: Boston
- Diocese: Diocese of Worcester
- Appointed: October 27, 1994
- Installed: November 8, 1994
- Retired: March 9, 2004
- Predecessor: Timothy Joseph Harrington
- Successor: Robert Joseph McManus
- Previous post: Bishop of Norwich (1975–1994)

Orders
- Ordination: May 3, 1953 by Russell McVinney
- Consecration: August 6, 1975 by John Francis Whealon, Vincent Joseph Hines, and Louis Edward Gelineau

Personal details
- Born: May 12, 1928 Providence, Rhode Island, U.S.
- Died: June 18, 2024 (aged 96) Worcester, Massachusetts, U.S.
- Education: Grand Seminary in Saint-Brieuc, France; Boston College
- Motto: In kindness and in truth

Styles of Daniel Patrick Reilly
- Reference style: His Excellency; The Most Reverend
- Spoken style: Your Excellency
- Religious style: Bishop

Daniel Patrick Reilly (May 12, 1928 – June 18, 2024) was an American Catholic prelate who served as bishop of Norwich in Connecticut from 1975 to 1994 and as Bishop of Worcester, Massachusetts, from 1994 to 2004.

Reilly was named in multiple lawsuits that accused him of covering up molestation in the clergy. He denied any involvement.

== Biography ==
=== Early life and education ===
Daniel Reilly was born on May 12, 1928, in Providence, Rhode Island, to Francis and Mary Ann (née O'Beirne) Reilly. He entered Our Lady of Providence Seminary in Warwick, Rhode Island, in 1943, then in 1948 continued his preparation for the priesthood at the Grand Seminary in Saint-Brieuc, France.

=== Ordination and ministry ===
Reilly was ordained to the priesthood for the Diocese of Providence on May 30, 1953, by Bishop Russell McVinney at the Cathedral of Saints Peter and Paul in Providence. After his ordination, Reilly briefly served in a parish before completing his graduate studies at Boston College in Boston, Massachusetts.

In the Diocese of Providence, Reilly was named assistant chancellor (1954), secretary to Bishop McVinney (1956), chancellor (1964), and vicar general (1972). Reilly attended two sessions of the Second Vatican Council in Rome during the early 1960s and was raised by the Vatican to the rank of monsignor in 1965.

=== Bishop of Norwich ===
On June 5, 1975, Pope Paul VI appointed Reilly as the third bishop of Norwich. He received his episcopal ordination on August 6, 1975, at the Cathedral of Saint Patrick in Norwich, Connecticut, by Archbishop John Whealon, with Bishops Vincent Hines and Louis Gelineau serving as co-consecrators.

In 1978, Reilly allowed Reverend Bruno Primavera to transfer from the Archdiocese of Toronto to Norwich. Before granting the transfer, Reilly received warnings from officials in Toronto about Primavera's fondness for teenage boys. In addition, a majority of the commission in Norwich that vetted new priests voted against Primavera. After sexual abuse allegations were lodged against him in one parish, Reilly transferred Primavera. When complaints arose in the second parish, Reilly in 1980 sent him back to Canada. In 1990, Primavera was sentenced to four years in prison in New Mexico for sexually abusing boys.

During his tenure in Norwich, Reilly transferred other priests facing allegations of sexual abuse to different parishes.

=== Bishop of Worcester ===
On October 27, 1994, Pope John Paul II appointed Reilly as the fourth bishop of Worcester. He was installed on December 8, 1994. During his tenure in Worcester, Reilly reopened St. Joseph Parish but merged it with Notre Dame des Canadiens Parish in Worcester. He raised over $50 million for his Forward in Faith campaign to place the diocese in a stable financial condition.

In 2002, Reilly became the first Catholic bishop to open the annual synod of the Evangelical Lutheran Church in America. In 2003, he expressed his opposition to same-sex marriage and civil unions for same sex couples. However, he declared that he was open to discussion on giving public benefits to same-sex couples.

=== Retirement and death ===
On March 9, 2004, John Paul II accepted Reilly's resignation as bishop of Worcester. He was succeeded by Bishop Robert McManus, then auxiliary bishop of Providence.

On September 17, 2012, the Diocese of Norwich reached a $1.1 million settlement with a New London, Connecticut, woman who claimed that she had been sexually abused as a minor by Reverend Thomas Shea from Joseph Parish in New London. The woman claimed that Reilly, when bishop of Norwich, knew about Shea's history of abuse allegations, but kept transferring him to different parishes.

In October 2020, Reilly reminisced about running retreats for men and women of the US Armed Forces in South Korea and Hawaii. He also spoke of travelling by plane and ferry to Block Island in Rhode Island to celebrate mass when he was a priest in the Diocese of Providence.

On December 30, 2020, the newspaper The Day calculated that Reilly and the Diocese of Norwich faced 35 separate lawsuits by men who had been sexually abused during the 1990s as minors. The men all accused Brother K. Paul McGlade, a monk who ran the Academy at Mount Saint John in Deep River, Connecticut. As bishop, Reilly had served on the Academy school board that recruited McGlade from Australia.

Reilly died on June 18, 2024, at the age of 96.

== See also ==
- Catholic Church hierarchy
- Catholic Church in the United States
- Historical list of the Catholic bishops of the United States
- List of Catholic bishops of the United States
- Lists of patriarchs, archbishops, and bishops

Catholic Church titles
Preceded by Timothy Joseph Harrington	Bishop of Worcester; 1994–2004	Succeeded by Robert Joseph McManus
Preceded by Vincent Joseph Hines	Bishop of Norwich; 1975–1994	Succeeded by Daniel Anthony Hart
