= St. Mary of Czestochowa Parish (Middletown, Connecticut) =

Coordinates: 41°33′13.7″N 72°38′57.5″W

- The Parish Family of Saint Mary of Czestochowa
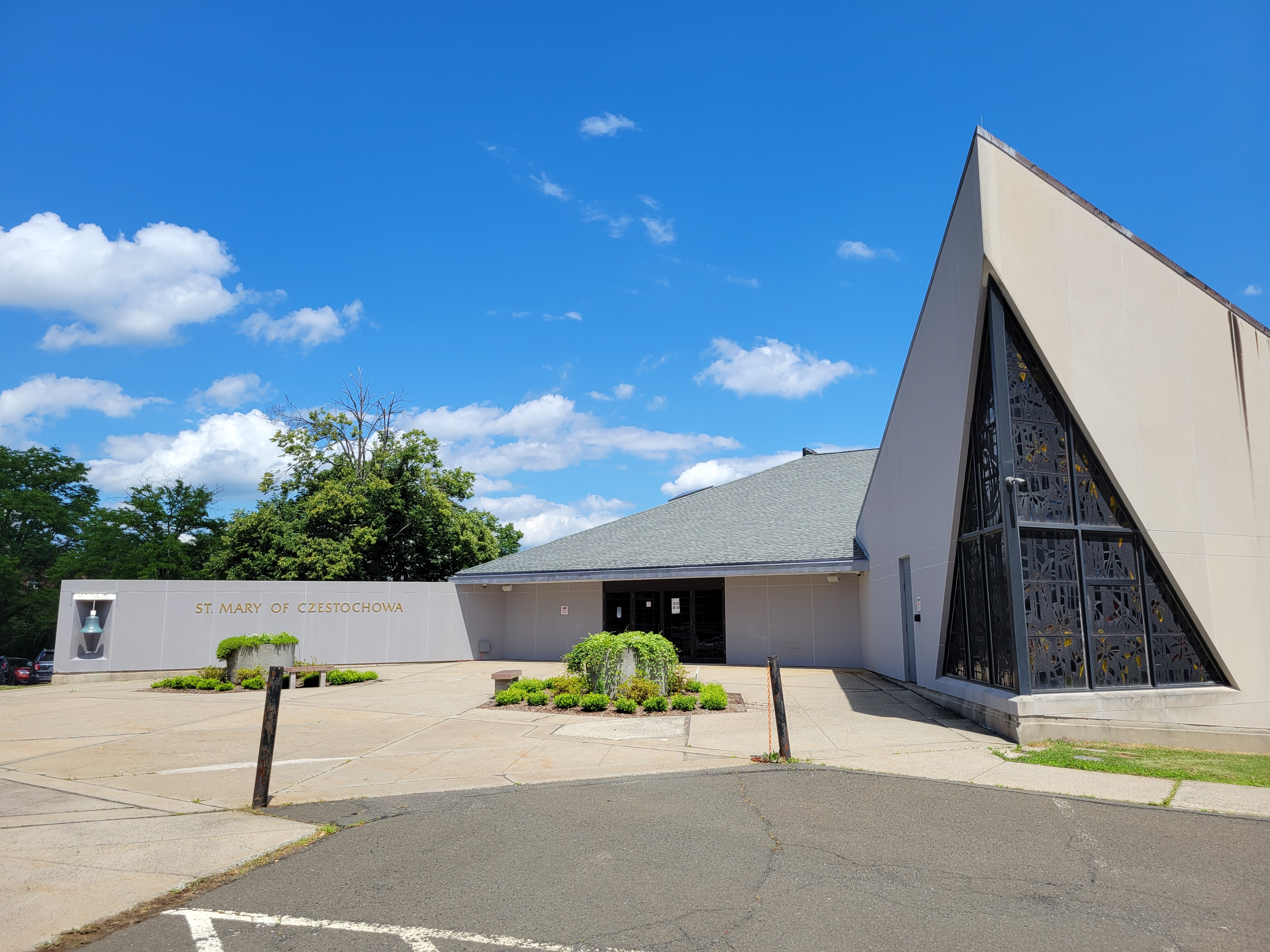
- St. Mary of Czestochowa
- St. Mary of Czestochowa Parish
- Location: 79 South Main Street; Middletown, Connecticut
- Country: United States
- Denomination: Roman Catholic
- Website: Parish web site

History
- Founded: 1903
- Founder: Polish immigrants
- Dedication: St. Mary of Czestochowa

Administration
- Province: Hartford
- Diocese: Norwich
- Deanery: Middletown

Clergy
- Bishop: Most Rev. Michael Richard Cote
- Pastor: Rev. Richard Sliwinski

St. Mary of Czestochowa Parish (Polish: Parafia św. Marii Częstochowskiej w Middletown) is a Catholic church parish in Middletown, Connecticut that was founded for Polish immigrants. The St. Mary of Czestochowa Church is a church building at 79 South Main Street in Middletown.

The parish was founded in 1903. It is one of the Polish-American Roman Catholic parishes in New England in the Roman Catholic Diocese of Norwich.

== History ==
With 300 Polish families resident in the city, Middletown’s Poles had determined to build a church of their own in 1902. A small group planned the organization of the St. Mary of Czestochowa parish, which gained formal approval from the bishop.

The Saint Kazimierz order of Polish Lancers (an organization which took its name and traditions from the Polish Uhlans) was a local organization that was founded in 1902 and existed until 1940, when it merged into another organization. It "was instrumental" in the founding of the church.

On February 28, 2010, the church held a memorial mass for victims of a local disaster, the Kleen Energy plant explosion.

=== Church buildings ===
After the founding of the parish in 1903, a church was opened in a building on Hubbard St. in 1905. That building served as the church until 1907, after which it was used as a school.

A more substantial and "beautiful" church building, with stained glass windows, was built next door and served the parish for many years, but was destroyed by fire in 1980. A convent building also existed but was demolished in 1979.

The church is located at 79 South Main Street.

=== Calvary Cemetery ===
The Parish owns and maintains Calvary Cemetery which is located at 305 Bow Lane in Middletown.

== School ==
The Saint Mary of Czestochowa School, at 87 South Main Street, is a K-8 elementary school with pre-school founded in 1912. The current building was constructed in 1930 It was listed in an inventory of buildings of Middletown by the Greater Middletown Preservation Trust in 1979. Architecturally, the school is a brick, two-story, Renaissance Revival building with some Art Deco details. In 2013, St. Mary of Czestochowa School merged with Saint John School, another local parochial elementary school, to become Saint Pope John Paul II Regional Diocesan Elementary School.

== Parish groups ==
The parish has a local Knights of Columbus council, denoted Pope John Paul II Council #14017
