= Daniel Anthony Hart =

American Catholic bishop (1927–2008)

His Excellency, The Most Reverend Daniel Anthony Hart
- Bishop of Norwich; Titular Bishop of Tepelta
- Church: Roman Catholic
- Archdiocese: Hartford
- Diocese: Norwich
- Appointed: September 12, 1995
- Installed: November 01, 1995
- Term ended: March 11, 2003
- Predecessor: Daniel Patrick Reilly
- Successor: Michael Richard Cote
- Previous posts: Auxiliary Bishop of Boston (1976 to 1995); Titular Bishop of Tepelta

Orders
- Ordination: February 02, 1953 by Richard James Cushing
- Consecration: October 18, 1976 by Humberto Sousa Medeiros, Thomas Joseph Riley, and Lawrence Joseph Riley

Personal details
- Born: August 24, 1927 Lawrence, Massachusetts, US
- Died: January 14, 2008 (aged 80) Windham, Connecticut, US
- Motto: Do not be afraid

Styles of Daniel Anthony Hart
- Reference style: His Excellency; The Most Reverend
- Spoken style: Your Excellency
- Religious style: Bishop

Daniel Anthony Hart (August 24, 1927 – January 14, 2008) was an American prelate of the Catholic Church. He served as bishop of the Diocese of Norwich in Connecticut from 1995 to 2003. He previously served as an auxiliary bishop of the Archdiocese of Boston in Massachusetts from 1976 to 1995

== Biography ==
=== Early life ===
Daniel Hart was born on August 24, 1927, in Lawrence, Massachusetts, the third son of John and Susan (née Tierney) Hart. After graduating from Central Catholic High School in Lawrence, he entered Boston College in Boston, Massachusetts, where he obtained a Bachelor of Science degree in business administration. After his college graduation, Hart decided to become a priest. He then enrolled at St. John's Seminary in Boston, earning a Master of Divinity degree in 1953.

=== Priesthood ===
Hart was ordained to the priesthood for the Archdiocese of Boston by Cardinal Richard Cushing on February 2, 1953. After his ordination, the archdiocese assigned Hart as a curate at Our Lady of the Assumption Parish in Lynnfield, Massachusetts. In 1954, the archdiocese allowed him to complete his graduate studies at Boston College.During that period, he served at St. Paul Parish in Wellesley, Massachusetts.

Hart's next assignment was as curate at Sacred Heart Parish in Malden, Massachusetts. In 1964, he was named vice-chancellor of archdiocese. In 1970, he was transferred to St. John the Baptist Parish in Peabody, Massachusetts. During that period, he was also elected president of the archdiocesan Senate of Priests. He earned a Master of Education degree, with a major in pastoral counseling, from Boston State College in Boston in 1972.

=== Auxiliary Bishop of Boston ===
On August 24, 1976, Hart was appointed auxiliary bishop of Boston and titular bishop of Tepelta by Pope Paul VI. He received his episcopal consecration on October 18, 1976, from Cardinal Humberto Sousa Medeiros, with Bishops Thomas Joseph Riley and Lawrence Joseph Riley serving as co-consecrators, at the Cathedral of the Holy Cross in Boston. As an auxiliary bishop, he served as regional bishop for the South Pastoral Region.

=== Bishop of Norwich ===
Hart was named the fourth bishop of Norwich on September 12, 1995 by Pope John Paul II. He was installed at the Cathedral of St. Patrick in Norwich, Connecticut, on November 1, 1995. Hart raised over $15 million through his "Response of Faith Campaign" in 1998 for the support and maintenance of diocesan services. He also expanded the diocesan Catholic Charities.

=== Retirement and death ===
Upon reaching the mandatory retirement age of 75, Hart submitted his letter of resignation as bishop of Norwich to John Paul II in August 2002. His resignation was accepted on March 11, 2003. After a six-month battle with cancer, Hart died at St. Joseph Living Center in Windham, Connecticut, at age 80. He is buried at St. Joseph Cemetery in Norwich.

== See also ==
- Catholic Church hierarchy
- Catholic Church in the United States
- Historical list of the Catholic bishops of the United States
- List of Catholic bishops of the United States
- Lists of patriarchs, archbishops, and bishops

== Episcopal succession ==
Catholic Church titles
Preceded by Daniel Patrick Reilly	Bishop of Norwich; 1995–2003	Succeeded by Michael Richard Cote
Preceded by –	Auxiliary Bishop of Boston; 1976–1995	Succeeded by –
