= St. Mary of Czestochowa Church =

St. Mary of Czestochowa Church may refer to:

- St. Mary of Czestochowa Church (Middletown, Connecticut)
- St. Mary of Częstochowa in Cicero, Cicero, Illinois
