= Richard Francis Reidy =

American Catholic priest (born 1958)

His Excellency, The Most Reverend Richard Francis Reidy
- Bishop of Norwich
- Diocese: Norwich
- Appointed: February 12, 2025
- Installed: April 29, 2025
- Predecessor: Michael Richard Cote

Orders
- Ordination: June 25, 1994 by Timothy Joseph Harrington
- Consecration: April 29, 2025 by Christopher J. Coyne, Robert Joseph McManus, and James T. Ruggieri

Personal details
- Born: May 30, 1958 (age 68) Worcester, Massachusetts, U.S.
- Education: College of the Holy Cross (BA); Boston College (JD); Pontifical Gregorian University (STD); Pontifical University of Saint Thomas Aquinas (MTh)
- Motto: Ut cognoscate Te (To know You)

Styles of Richard Francis Reidy
- Reference style: His Excellency; The Most Reverend
- Spoken style: Your Excellency
- Religious style: Bishop

Richard Francis Reidy (born May 30, 1958) is an American priest of the Roman Catholic Church who has been serving as bishop for the Diocese of Norwich in Connecticut since 2025.

== Biography ==
=== Early life ===
Richard Reidy was born on May 30, 1958 in Worcester, Massachusetts. He graduated from the College of the Holy Cross with a Bachelor of Arts degree in political science in 1980 and earned a Juris Doctor from Boston College Law School in 1983. Reidy practiced law at Mirick, O’Connell, DeMallie & Lougee in Massachusetts from 1983 to 1990.

After deciding to become a priest, Reidy entered St. Mary's Seminary and University in Baltimore, Maryland. After one year, he went to Rome to reside at the Pontifical North American College while studying there. He received a Bachelor of Sacred Theology degree from the Pontifical Gregorian University and a Master of Spirituality degree from the Pontifical University of St. Thomas Aquinas.

=== Priesthood ===
On June 25, 1994, Reidy was ordained to the priesthood for the Diocese of Worcester at the Cathedral of St. Paul in Worcester by Bishop Timothy Joseph Harrington. After his ordination, the diocese assigned Reidy as an assistant pastor at St. Peter Parish in Worcester. In 1995, he was appointed rector of the Cathedral of St. Paul.

In 2008, Reidy enrolled at the Catholic University of America in Washington, D.C. to study canon law. After graduating in 2010, he returned to Worcester to serve as defender of the bond in the diocesan tribunal and as pastor of Saint Ann Parish in Oxford, Massachusetts. Reidy was named vicar general by Bishop Robert J. McManus in 2013.

=== Bishop of Norwich ===
Pope Francis appointed Reidy as bishop of Norwich on February 12, 2025. On April 29, 2025, Reidy was consecrated at the Cathedral of St. Patrick in Norwich by Bishop Christopher J. Coyne.

== See also ==
- Catholic Church hierarchy
- Catholic Church in the United States
- Historical list of the Catholic bishops of the United States
- List of Catholic bishops of the United States
- Lists of patriarchs, archbishops, and bishops

== Episcopal succession ==
Catholic Church titles
| Preceded by Michael Richard Cote | Bishop of Norwich; 2025-Present | Succeeded by Incumbent |
