= Academy of the Holy Family =

Location
- 54 West Main Street; Baltic, (New London County), Connecticut 06330; United States
- Coordinates: 41°36′59″N 72°5′13″W

Information
- Type: Private, day & boarding, College-prep
- Religious affiliation: Roman Catholic
- Denomination: Sisters of Charity of Our Lady, Mother of the Church
- Founder: John Zwijsen
- CEEB code: 070015
- Principal: Mary David
- Grades: 9–12
- Gender: Girls
- Colors: Blue and gold
- Team name: Marist Eagles
- Accreditation: New England Association of Schools and Colleges
- Tuition: $8,000 (books included), $25,000 (domestic residents), $28,000 (international residents)
- Website: ahfbaltic.com

The Academy of the Holy Family (AHF) is private Catholic all-girls college preparatory school in Baltic, Connecticut. It is under the jurisdiction of the Diocese of Norwich.

== History ==
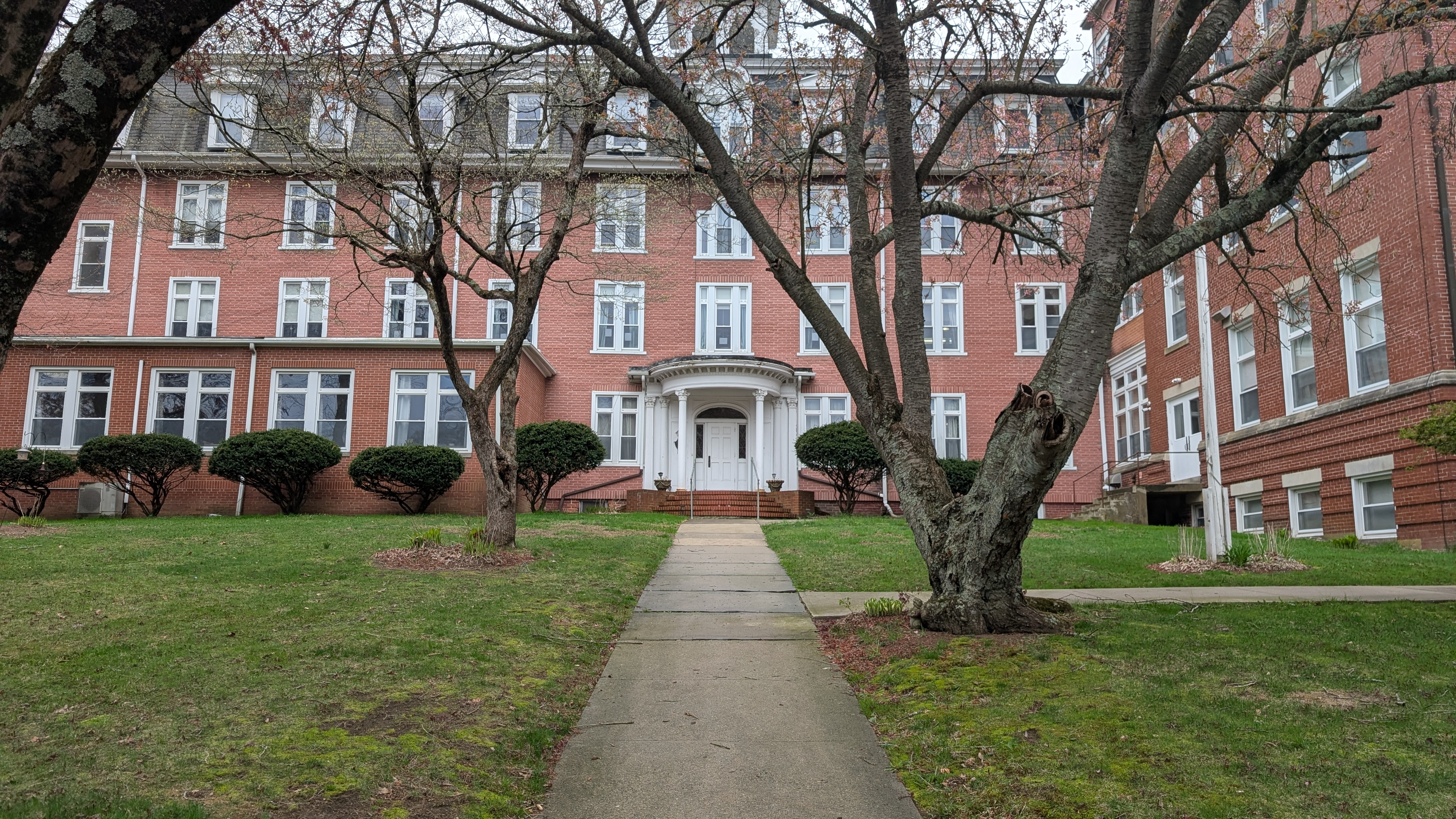
Front of Academy of the Holy Family (Baltic, Connecticut)

The Sisters of Charity of Our Lady Mother of Mercy was founded as a parochial community by Msgr Johannes Zwijsen on November 23, 1832, at Tilburg in the Netherlands. It was his intention to "simply to “establish a school where poor children could be taught reading, writing, sewing, and knitting”. The community soon spread beyond the parish, and in 1874 was invited to open a school in the United States.

When the Sisters arrived they first established a grade school and a girls’ high school for day and resident students in the small mill town of Sprague, Connecticut, where the motherhouse is located. In 1970, the Sisters of Charity of Our Lady, Mother of the Church, split off as a separate community and continue to operate HFA.

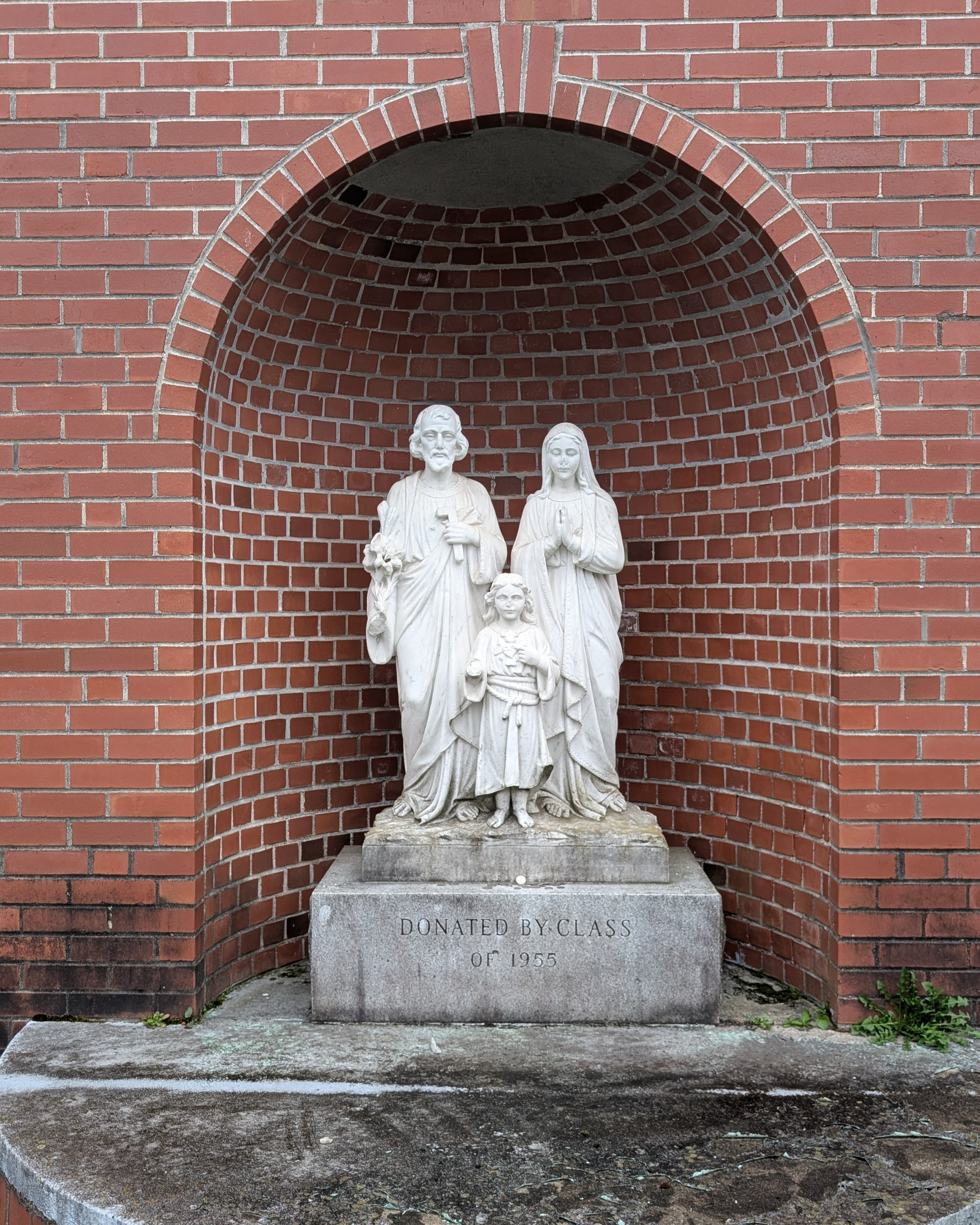
Statue of the Holy Family at the Academy of the Holy Family

The Academy is approved by the State of Connecticut and is accredited by the New England Association of Schools and colleges. It is owned and operated by the Sisters of Charity of Our Lady, Mother of the Church.
