= Xavier High School (Connecticut) =

Private boys school in Middletown, Connecticut, U.S.

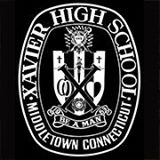

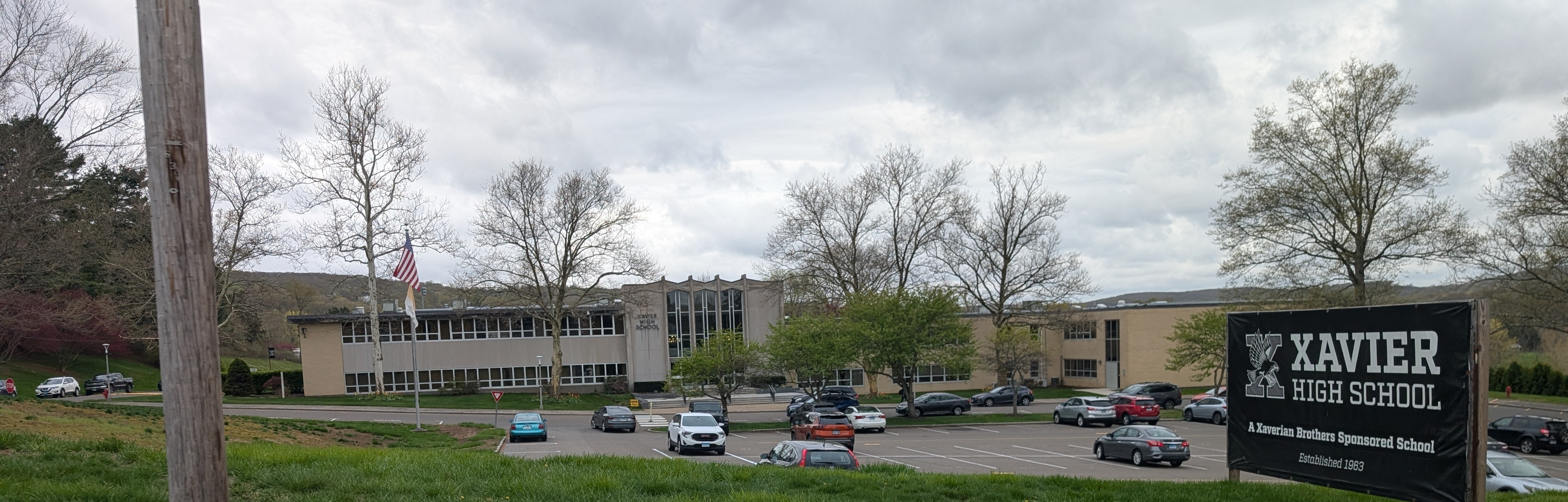

Location
- 181 Randolph Road; Middletown, Middlesex County, Connecticut 06457; United States; 41°31′59″N 72°37′15″W

Information
- Type: Private, All-Boys
- Motto: Be A Man
- Religious affiliation: Catholic
- Established: 1963 (63 years ago)
- CEEB code: 070412
- Head teacher: Nick Cerreta '01
- Teaching staff: 61.9 (on an FTE basis)
- Grades: 9–12
- Enrollment: 788 (2015–16)
- Student to teacher ratio: 12.7:1
- Campus: Suburban
- Colors: Black and white
- Athletics conference: Southern Connecticut Conference
- Team name: Falcons
- Accreditation: New England Association of Schools and Colleges
- Newspaper: The Kestrel
- Yearbook: The Don
- Website: www.xavierhighschool.org

Xavier High School is an all-boys college preparatory Catholic high school in Middletown, Connecticut, United States. It is run by the Xaverian Brothers. Teenage boys from over 65 towns surrounding and including Middletown attend Xavier; despite the fact that students commute from a very broad area all students, their parents, faculty, and staff, regardless of how far away they live from the school, are referred to by Xavier officials as "The Xavier Community".

Mercy High School, Xavier's all-girls sister school, is located down the street 3 miles (4.8 km) away from Xavier.

Xavier is sponsored jointly by the Roman Catholic Diocese of Norwich and the Congregation of the Brothers of Saint Francis Xavier. The school was incorporated under the laws of the State of Connecticut on February 18, 1963.

== Administration and academics ==
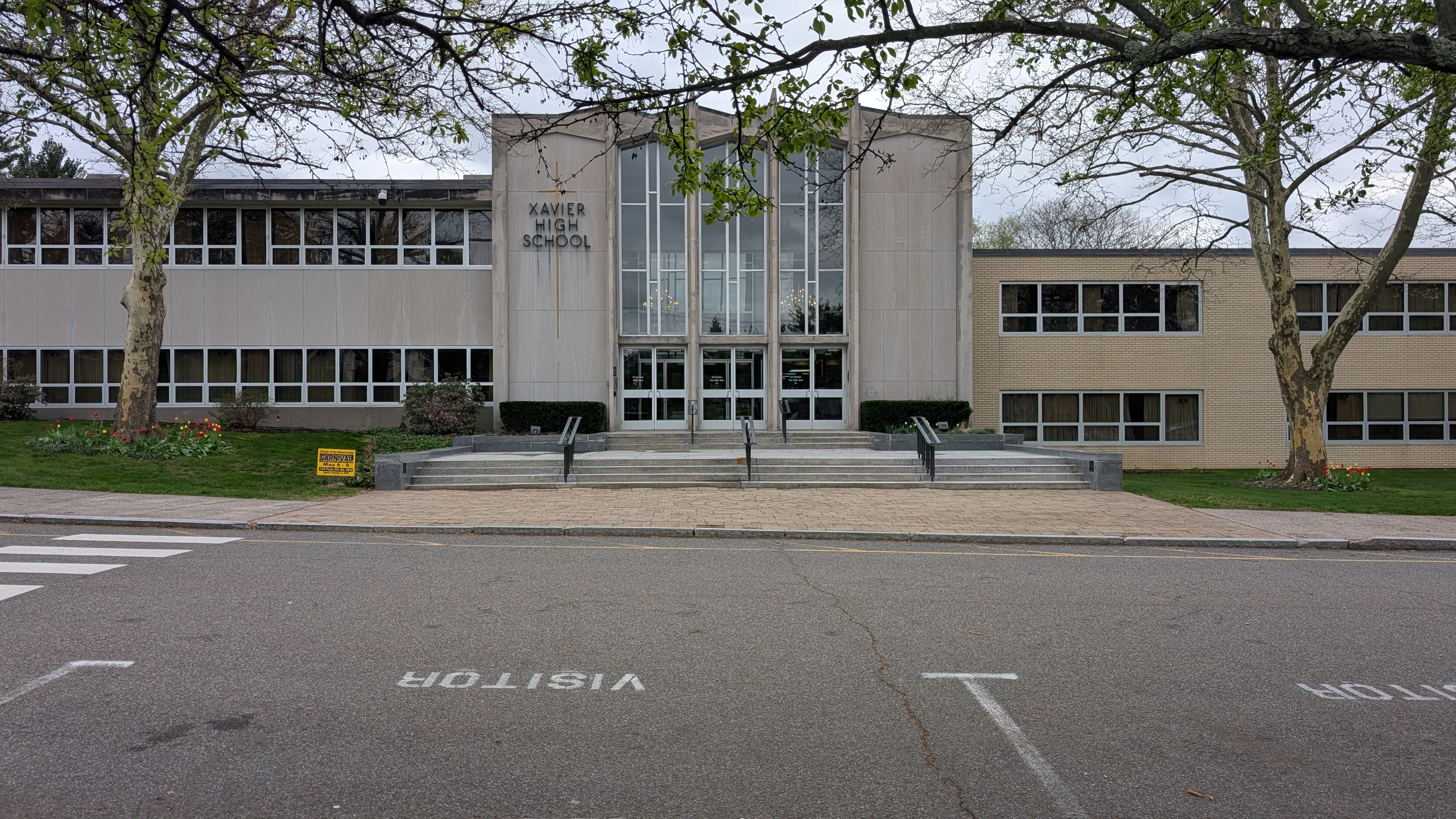
Front of Xavier High School

Xavier High School is run day-to-day on a Headmaster-Principal model. Xavier draws a diverse student body from 60 different towns across Connecticut and internationally. Xavier offers Advanced Placement courses as well as fourteen courses that qualify students to earn college credit at UConn and other universities.

== Sports ==
Xavier has athletic teams in 20 different sports. They compete in the Southern Connecticut Conference (SCC) of the Connecticut Interscholastic Athletic Conference (CIAC).

=== Athletic highlights ===
Xavier's ultimate frisbee team won back to back New England championships in 2011 and 2012. The Falcons' opponent in the championship game in 2012 was none other than Middletown High School which is located in the same town as Xavier.

Xavier's football team won the Class LL state championship in 2005, 2010, 2011, 2012 and again in 2014. The team has also had several undefeated seasons including 1971, 1972, 1974, 2005, 2010 and 2011.

Xavier's golf team won the Division 1 State Championship in 2017. The Falcons shot 301 winning the program's first state title.

Xavier's sailing team won Connecticut State Championships in 2004 and 2006, and placed 7th at the New England Championships in both team and fleet racing in 2006.

Xavier's Cross Country team holds the most state titles out of any sport at the school, winning its latest in 2021. In 2017 they won their 6th New England Championship and progressed to the Nike Cross Nationals, placing 18th out of 22 teams there.

Xavier's 4x1 mile relay team placed 6th place in the nation in the Nike Indoor National Championships in March 2007.

Xavier's soccer team won the State Championship in 1995.

Xavier's Wrestling team won three state championships in 2011, 2012, and 2020 with the 2012 being declared the #1 wrestling team in the state of Connecticut, under head coach Michael Cunningham.

XSN (Xavier Streaming Network) was created in 2013 to help stream and showcase as many of these games and other streaming events over the years. The club is entirely student-ran for students who have an interest in broadcasting or streaming. In their time, the club has streamed many different events for Xavier including home basketball games, football games, soccer games, and even Xavier masses and concerts for the school over the past few years.

Wins in CIAC State Championships
Sport	Class	Year(s)
Cross country (boys)	MM	2025
Cross country (boys)	L	1970, 1975, 1976, 1977, 1978, 1979, 2018, 2019, 2021, 2022, 2023, 2024
Cross country (boys)	LL	1980, 1981, 1983, 1985, 1986, 1988, 1990, 1992, 1994, 1996, 1999, 2009
Cross country (boys)	Open	1970, 1975, 1978, 1979, 1980, 1985, 1986, 1988, 1996, 1999, 2009, 2017, 2018
Football	LL	2005, 2010, 2011, 2012, 2014
Golf (boys)	I	2017, 2024, 2025, 2026
Soccer (boys)	LL	1995
Track and field (indoor, boys)	M	1975 (Co-champions with St. Paul)
Track and field (indoor, boys)	L	1978, 1980, 1985, 1987, 1988, 1993, 1996, 1997, 1998 (Co-champions with Danbury), 1999, 2019, 2022, 2023, 2024, 2025
Track and field (indoor, boys)	Open	1980, 1986, 1987, 1988 (Co-champions with Staples), 1996, 1999
Track and field (outdoor, boys)	M	1975
Track and field (outdoor, boys)	L	1977, 1978, 1980, 2023, 2024, 2025
Track and field (outdoor, boys)	LL	1983, 1989, 1996, 1997, 1998
Track and field (outdoor, boys)	Open	1974, 1986, 1987, 1989, 1996, 1999
Wrestling	L	2020, 2022, 2023, 2024, 2025, 2026
Wrestling	LL	2011, 2012
Wrestling	Open	2012, 2022, 2023, 2024, 2025, 2026

== Technology ==
Xavier participates in a "BYOD" Bring your Own Device" Program, which allows students to bring their own laptop and integrate technology into their classroom experience.

== Notable alumni ==
- Michael Aresco (1968) - broadcasting executive and Commissioner of the American Athletic Conference
- Jeff Bagwell (1986) - Baseball Hall of Fame Class of 2017 Houston Astros
- Thom Brooks (1992) - political philosopher and legal scholar
- Kevin Lacz (2000) - Navy SEAL and author of The Last Punisher
- Nick Greenwood (2005) - Former pitcher for the St. Louis Cardinals
- Amari Spievey (2006) - Former NFL safety for the Detroit Lions
- Ryan Preece (2009) - Stock car driver in the NASCAR Whelen Modified Tour, the NASCAR Craftsman Truck Series, the NASCAR Xfinity Series and the NASCAR Cup Series
- Will Tye (2010; transferred to Salisbury School) - Former NFL tight end for the New York Giants
- Jovan Santos-Knox (2012) - Professional CFL player
- Tim Boyle (2013) - Quarterback for the New York Giants
- Richard Ciamarra (2017) - tennis player
- Eli Pemberton (2016 - transferred) - basketball player in the Israeli Basketball Premier League
- Will Levis (2018) - Quarterback for the Tennessee Titans

== See also ==
Other boys' schools in Connecticut:

- Fairfield College Preparatory School
