= Eli Pemberton =

American basketball player (born 1997)

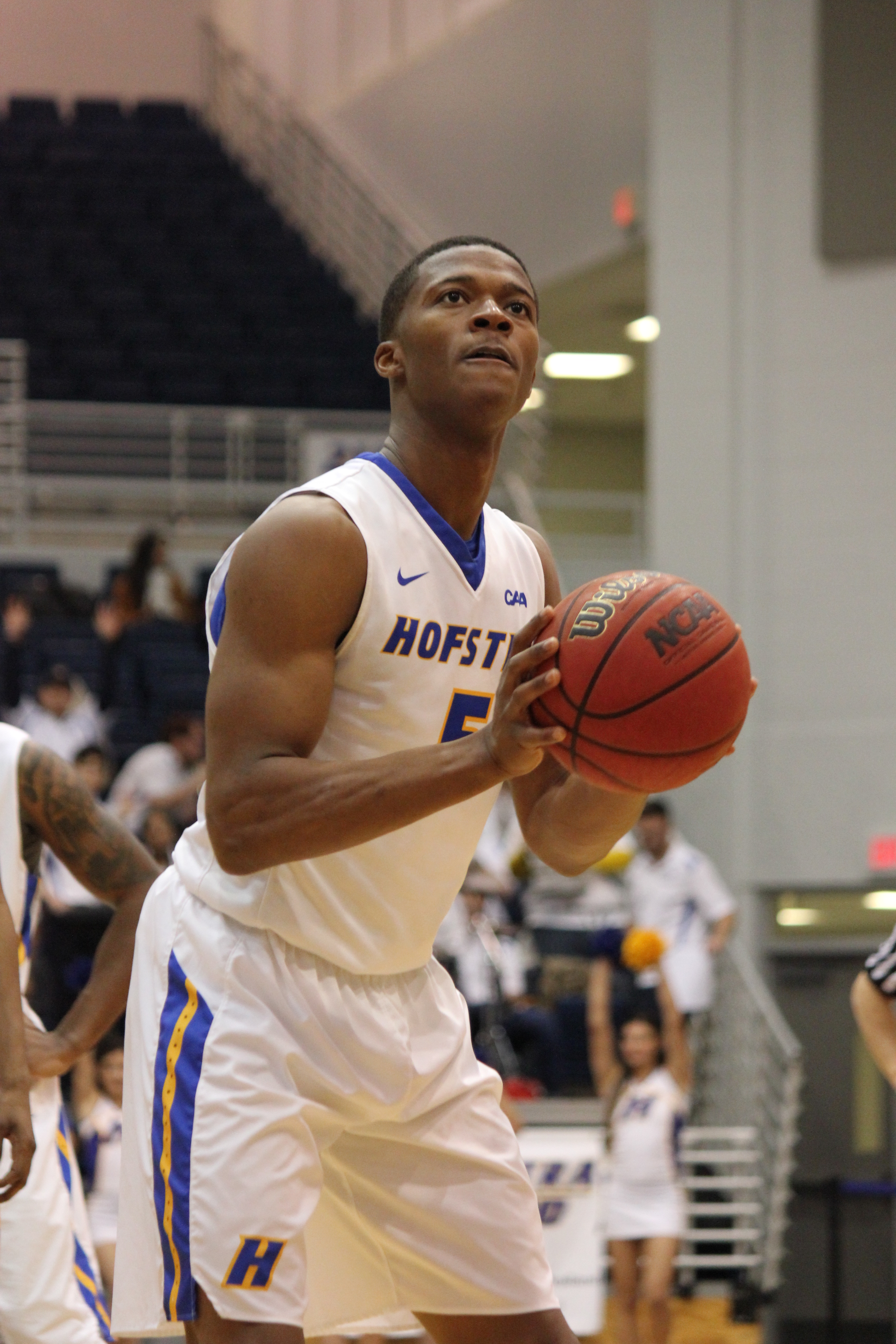

No. 11 – Austin Spurs
- Position: Shooting guard
- League: NBA G League

Personal information
- Born: May 31, 1997 (age 29) Middletown, Connecticut, U.S.
- Listed height: 6 ft 5 in (1.96 m)
- Listed weight: 195 lb (88 kg)

Career information
- High school: Xavier (Middletown, Connecticut); The Masters School (West Simsbury, Connecticut); Cheshire Academy (Cheshire, Connecticut)
- College: Hofstra (2016–2020)
- NBA draft: 2020: undrafted
- Playing career: 2021–present

Career history
- 2021–2023: Santa Cruz Warriors
- 2023: Ottawa BlackJacks
- 2023: Reeder Samsunspor
- 2023–2024: Hapoel Be'er Sheva
- 2024–2025: Hubo Limburg United
- 2025: MHP Riesen Ludwigsburg
- 2025: Górnik Wałbrzych
- 2025–2026: Iowa Wolves
- 2026–present: Austin Spurs

Career highlights
- 2× Second-team All-CAA (2019, 2020); CAA All-Rookie team (2017)
- Stats at Basketball Reference
Medals
Men's basketball
Representing United States
FIBA AmeriCup
Bronze medal – third place	2022 Brazil

Elijah Malik Pemberton (born May 31, 1997) is an American professional basketball player for the Austin Spurs of the NBA G League. He played college basketball for the Hofstra Pride.

== High school career ==
Pemberton attended Xavier High School for three years. He played one season at The Masters School and one at Cheshire Academy, scoring more than 2,000 points in his scholastic career. Pemberton averaged 26 points per game in 2014–15 and 21 points per game in 2015–16. He became a four-time team Most Valuable Player between 2013 and 2016, a four time All-Connecticut selection. He also became the 2016 Jordan Brand Classic Regional Game MVP, a first team All-New England pick as a senior and a second team All-New England as a junior.

== College career ==
Pemberton played college basketball for Hofstra. He started his second game as a freshman and was named CAA rookie of the week on three occasions. Pemberton averaged 12.8 points, 3.3 rebounds and 2.0 assists per game, and ranked third in the CAA with a .406 three point percentage as a freshman. As a sophomore, he averaged 15.9 points, 4.8 rebounds and 2.2 assists per game.

Pemberton averaged 15 points and 4.8 rebounds per game as a junior, helping lead Hofstra to a CAA regular season championship. In his senior season, he saw action in 34 games with averages of 17.6 points (8th in the CAA), 5.6 rebounds, 1.9 assists and 1.29 steals over 36.3 minutes per game, and had a free throw percentage of .854 (3rd). Pemberton led Hofstra to a berth in the 2020 NCAA tournament, but the tournament was cancelled due to the COVID-19 pandemic.

By the end of his college career, he had earned All-CAA Second Team honors as a junior and a senior in addition to the 2020 All-CAA Tournament honors. Pemberton saw action in 129 career games while averaging 15.4 points, 4.7 rebounds and 2.1 assists in 34.8 minutes per contest. Pemberton ranks ninth in Hofstra program history with 1,982 career points and fourth with 215 three-pointers.

== Professional career ==
=== Santa Cruz Warriors (2021–2023) ===
After going undrafted in the 2020 NBA draft, Pemberton signed an Exhibit 10 deal with the Golden State Warriors on December 19, 2020, but was waived the same day. On January 12, 2021, he signed as an affiliate player with the Santa Cruz Warriors of the NBA G League, where he played 10 games and averaged 6.4 points, 2.8 rebounds and 1.0 assists in 17.6 minutes per game.

=== Ottawa BlackJacks (2023) ===
On April 27, 2023, Pemberton signed with the Ottawa BlackJacks of the Canadian Elite Basketball League, for whom he played two games. However, he was released on June 20.

=== Reeder Samsunspor (2023) ===
On August 16, 2023, Pemberton signed with Reeder Samsunspor of the Turkish Basketbol Süper Ligi, for whom he played three games.

=== Hapoel Be'er Sheva (2023–2024) ===
On December 26, 2023, Pemberton signed with Hapoel Be'er Sheva of the Israeli Basketball Premier League.

=== Hubo Limburg United (2024–2025) ===
On June 21, 2024, Pemberton signed with Hubo Limburg United of the BNXT League.

=== Riesen Ludwigsburg players (2025) ===
On January 23, 2025, signed with MHP Riesen Ludwigsburg of the Basketball Bundesliga (BBL).

=== Górnik Wałbrzych (2025) ===
On August 19, 2025, he signed with Górnik Wałbrzych of the Polish Basketball League (PLK).

== Personal life ==
Pemberton has one brother, William Allen, who played basketball at Johnson C. Smith and a cousin, Chauncey Hardy, who played basketball at Sacred Heart. He earned a degree in Management in May, 2020.
