= Michael Richard Cote =

American prelate (born 1949)

His Excellency, The Most Reverend Michael Richard Côté
- Bishop Emeritus of Norwich
- Church: Roman Catholic
- Diocese: Norwich
- Appointed: March 11, 2003
- Installed: May 14, 2003
- Retired: September 3, 2024
- Predecessor: Daniel Anthony Hart
- Successor: Richard Francis Reidy
- Previous post: Auxiliary Bishop of Portland and Titular Bishop of Cebarades (1995-2003)

Orders
- Ordination: June 25, 1975 by Pope Paul VI
- Consecration: July 27, 1995 by Joseph John Gerry, Robert Edward Mulvee, and Raymond Leo Burke

Personal details
- Born: June 19, 1949 (age 77) Sanford, Maine, US
- Motto: Above all charity

Styles of Michael Richard Côté
- Reference style: His Excellency; The Most Reverend
- Spoken style: Your Excellency
- Religious style: Bishop

Michael Richard Côté (born June 19, 1949) is a retired American prelate of the Roman Catholic Church, recently serving as the bishop of the Diocese of Norwich in Connecticut and parts of New York from 2003 to 2024. He previously served as auxiliary bishop of the Diocese of Portland in Maine from 1995 to 2003

== Biography ==
=== Early life ===
Michael Côté was born on June 19, 1949, in Sanford, Maine. He first attended Our Lady of Lourdes Seminary in Cassadaga, New York, then went to Assumption College in Worcester, Massachusetts. Côté later graduated from St. Mary's Seminary College in Baltimore, Maryland with a Bachelor of Philosophy degree. He then went to Rome to study at the Pontifical Gregorian University, receiving a Master of Theology degree in 1975.

=== Priesthood ===
Côté was ordained to the priesthood for the Diocese of Portland by Pope Paul VI on June 25, 1975, in St. Peter's Basilica in Rome.

After Côté returned to Maine in 1975, the diocese assigned him as parochial vicar at Saints Athanasius and John Parish in Rumford, Maine and Holy Rosary Parish in Caribou, Maine. Côté went to Washington D.C. in 1979 to enter the School of Canon Law at the Catholic University of America He received his Licentiate of Canon Law from Catholic University in 1981.

Following his return to Maine from Catholic University in 1981, Bishop Edward O'Leary appointed Côté as adjutant judicial vicar of the diocesan tribunal. He became a member of the pastoral council in 1984, serving there for four years.

In 1989, Côté returned to Washington to serve as secretary of the Nunciature of the Holy See. After five years with the nunciature, Côté was appointed pastor of Sacred Heart Parish in Auburn, Maine. In 1994, he became a member and then the chair of the council of priests for the diocese. That same year, Côté was named to the college of consultors.

=== Auxiliary Bishop of Portland ===
On May 9, 1995, Côté was appointed as auxiliary bishop of Portland and titular bishop of Cebarades by John Paul II. He received his episcopal consecration on July 27, 1995, at the Cathedral of the Immaculate Conception in Portland from Bishop Joseph Gerry, with Bishop Robert Mulvee and Cardinal Raymond Burke serving as co-consecrators. As an auxiliary bishop, Côté's primary ministry was to supervised the parishes in Northern Maine.

=== Bishop of Norwich ===
John Paul II appointed Côté as the fifth bishop of Norwich on March 11, 2003. He was installed on May 14, 2003.

In 2004, Côté became embroiled in a dispute with Reverend Justinian B. Rweyemamu, the parochial vicar at St. Bernard Parish in Rockville, Connecticut. Rweyemamu claimed that Côté had denied him a promotion because he is black. After Rweyemamu filed a complaint with the US Equal Employment Opportunity Commission, Côté allegedly removed him from his parish and his chaplain job in retaliation. In response, Côté said he removed Rweyemamu due to his refusal to answers any questions about Bugurka Orphans and Community Economic Development, his private charity in Tanzania, and the content of some of his homilies. In Spring 2005, Côté unsuccessfully sued to evict Rweyemamu from a church rectory. In August 2005, Côté ordered him to move to a convent in Sprague, Connecticut and live in isolation.

On April 3, 2010, Côté announced his opposition to a bill in the Connecticut General Assembly that would remove the statute of limitations for sexual abuse crimes. A letter signed by the Connecticut bishops said that this bill would cause tremendous damage to Catholic institutions and missions. On December 14, 2010, Côté announced that he was replacing Haitian Ministries for the Diocese of Norwich with a new organization, Diocese of Norwich Outreach to Haiti, Inc. He mentioned that the diocese was slowly distributing $430,892 collected from parishioners in January 2010 to prevent waste and misappropriation.

On February 10, 2019, Côté released a list of 43 clerics from the diocese with substantial allegations of abuse against them. Of the 43 clerics, 33 were deceased and the remainder were not performing ministry. He announced on July 16, 2021 that the diocese was declaring Chapter 11 bankruptcy to facilitate settlement of sexual abuse lawsuits. Over 60 lawsuits were filed by former residents of Mount Saint John School in Deep River, Connecticut, a former church residential school for troubled boys.

On his 75th birthday, Cote submitted his letter of resignation. Pope Francis accepted Cote's resignation effective September 3, 2024. He became Bishop Emeritus of the Diocese once his resignation took effect.

== See also ==
- Catholic Church hierarchy
- Catholic Church in the United States
- Historical list of the Catholic bishops of the United States
- List of Catholic bishops of the United States
- Lists of patriarchs, archbishops, and bishops

== Episcopal succession ==
Catholic Church titles
Preceded by Daniel Anthony Hart	Bishop of Norwich; 2003–2024	Succeeded by vacant
Preceded by –	Auxiliary Bishop of Portland; 1995–2003	Succeeded by –
