= Diocese of Norwich, Connecticut =

Latin Catholic diocese in Connecticut, U.S.

Diocese of Norwich Diœcesis Norvicensis

Catholic
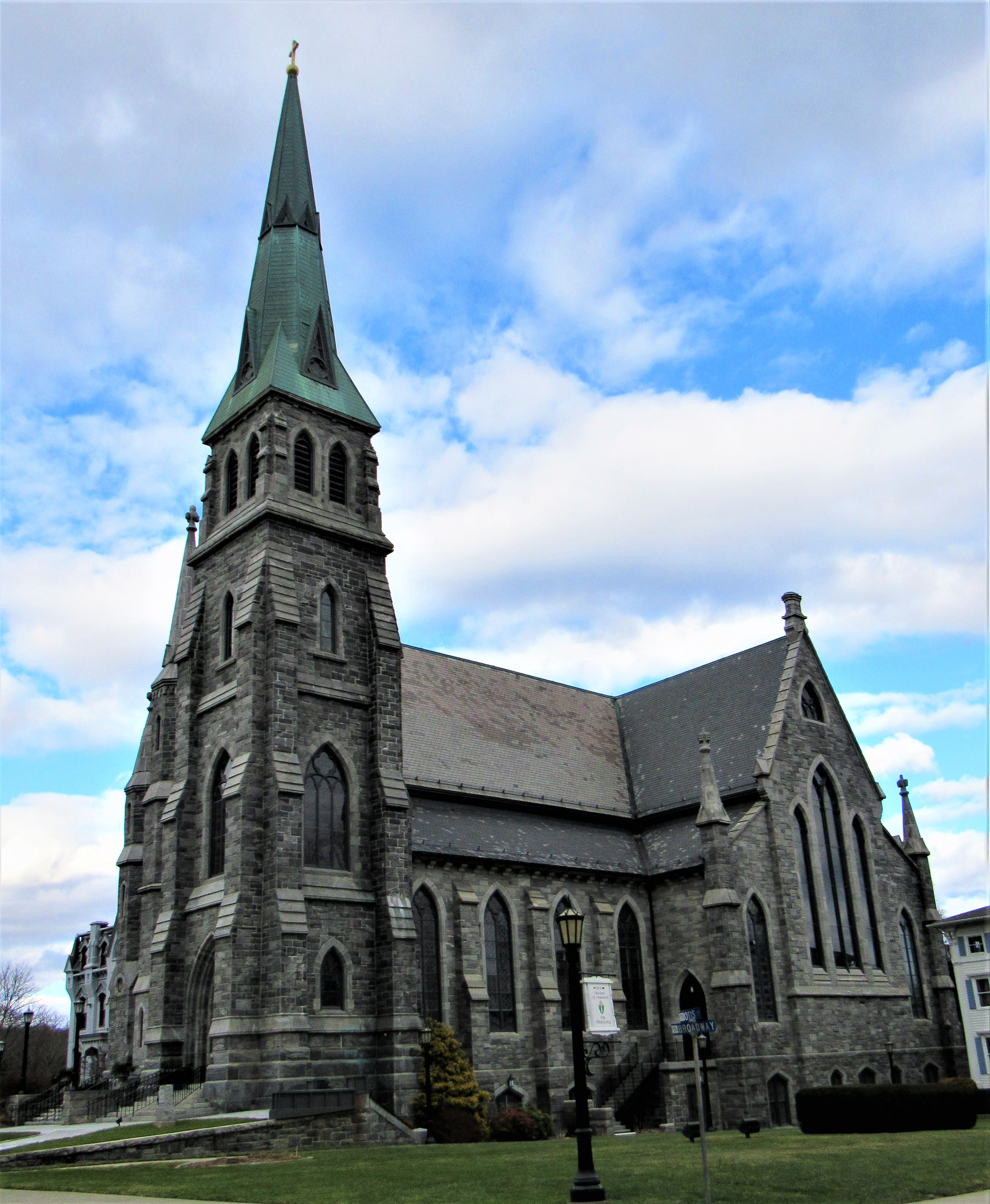
- Cathedral of Saint Patrick, Norwich

- Coat of arms

Location
- Country: United States
- Territory: Middlesex County, New London County, Windham County, Tolland County, Connecticut, and Fishers Island, New York.
- Ecclesiastical province: Hartford
- Metropolitan: Hartford
- Deaneries: Middletown, New London, Norwich, Old Saybrook, Putnam, Vernon, Willimantic
- Coordinates: 41°31′50″N 72°04′38″W

Statistics
- Population: 228,520 (32.1%)
- Parishes: 76

Information
- Denomination: Catholic
- Sui iuris church: Latin Church
- Rite: Roman Rite
- Established: August 6, 1953
- Cathedral: Cathedral of Saint Patrick
- Patron saint: St. Anne; St. Patrick

Current leadership
- Pope: Leo XIV
- Bishop: Richard Francis Reidy
- Metropolitan Archbishop: Christopher J. Coyne
- Vicar General: Leszek T. Janik
- Judicial Vicar: Ted F. Tumicki
- Bishops emeritus: Michael Richard Cote

Map
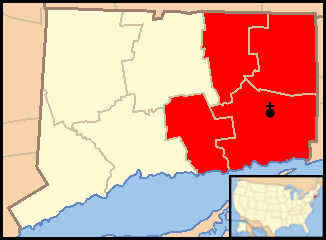

Website
- norwichdiocese.org

The Diocese of Norwich (Latin: Diœcesis Norvicensis) is a diocese of the Catholic Church in the states of Connecticut and New York in the United States. The mother church of the diocese is the Cathedral of St. Patrick in Norwich.

== History ==
=== 1600 to 1800 ===
In the 17th through the early 19th centuries, the Congregational, or Puritan, Church was the state church in the British Province of Connecticut. Its ministers were vociferously anti-Catholic in their writings and preaching. They viewed the Catholic Church as a foreign political power and saw Catholics as being loyal only to the Vatican. At that time, there were very few Catholics living in the colony. During the American Revolution, Catholic chaplains with the French Navy celebrated mass for French soldiers and sailors based on Fishers Island.

After the American Revolution ended in 1783, attitudes towards Catholics in the United States began to change. The Connecticut General Assembly passed an act of toleration in 1784, allowing any Protestant to avoid paying taxes to support the local Congregational Church, provided that they could prove membership and regular attendance at another Protestant church.

The US Constitution, ratified in 1789, guaranteed religious freedom for all religions. That same year, the Vatican erected the Diocese of Baltimore to cover the entire territory of the United States, including Connecticut. In 1791, the Connecticut General Assembly granted the same rights to all Christians, including Catholics. However, the act had little practical effect for Catholics as there were no parishes in the state.

=== 1800 to 1900 ===
In 1808, the Vatican erected the Diocese of Boston, containing Connecticut and the rest of New England. In 1818, the Connecticut General Assembly repealed Congregationalism as the official religion in the state, ending its taxpayer support. When that status was repealed, it opened the door for the Catholic Church to establish itself in Connecticut

The construction of the Norwich and Worcester Railroad in the 1830s brought Irish Catholic workers into the region, leading to the establishment of the first Catholic population in the area. It grew quickly. By the 1840s, Bishop Benedict Joseph Fenwick of Boston petitioned the Vatican for a diocese for Connecticut and Rhode Island.

In 1843, Pope Gregory XVI established the Diocese of Hartford, taking all of Connecticut and Rhode Island from the Diocese of Boston. The Norwich area would be under the Diocese of Hartford for the next 100 years. The first Catholic parish in Middletown, established in the 1830s to serve Irish immigrants, was Saint John's. Its church was completed in 1843. It is the oldest parish in the diocese.

The first Catholic parish in Norwich, St. Mary's, opened in 1845 with 230 members. That number increased to 5,000 by 1854. In New London, Saint Mary Star of the Sea Parish opened in the 1840s in a storefront. In Willimantic, the first parish was St. Joseph's, established in 1859 for Irish immigrants.

=== 1900 to 2000 ===
The Xaverian Brothers opened the St. John’s Industrial School, a residential boarding schools for boys, in 1904 in Deep River. It later became known as the Mount Saint John School.

The Diocese of Norwich was created by Pope Pius XII in 1953, taking its territory from the Diocese of Hartford. He appointed Bernard Flanagan from the Diocese of Burlington as the first bishop of Norwich. During his tenure, Flanagan oversaw the establishment of several secondary schools and parishes within his diocese.

The Franciscan priest Eusebe Menard founded Holy Apostles Seminary in Cromwell in 1957 to serve older men wanting to enter the priesthood. Today it is Holy Apostles College and Seminary. That same year, Pius XII transferred Fishers Island, a part of New York State in Long Island Sound, from the Diocese of Brooklyn to the Diocese of Norwich. Pope John XXIII named Flanagan as bishop of the Diocese of Worcester in 1959.

The second bishop of Norwich was Vincent Hines of Hartford, appointed by John XIII in 1959. During his tenure, Hines led a $1 million fundraising campaign for schools in the diocese. He oversaw construction of Xavier High School in Middletown, Connecticut, for boys in 1963 and Mercy High School, also in Middletown, for girls in 1965. Hines retired as bishop of Norwich in 1975.

In 1975, Pope Paul VI appointed Daniel Reilly of the Diocese of Providence as the third bishop of Norwich. He served in Norwich for 19 years before Pope John Paul II named him bishop of the Diocese of Worcester in 1994. To replace Reilly in Norwich, the pope named Auxiliary Bishop Daniel Anthony Hart of Boston. During his eight-year tenure, Hart helped raise over $15 million through his "Response of Faith Campaign" in 1998 for the support and maintenance of diocesan services. He also expanded the diocesan Catholic Charities.

=== 2000 to present ===
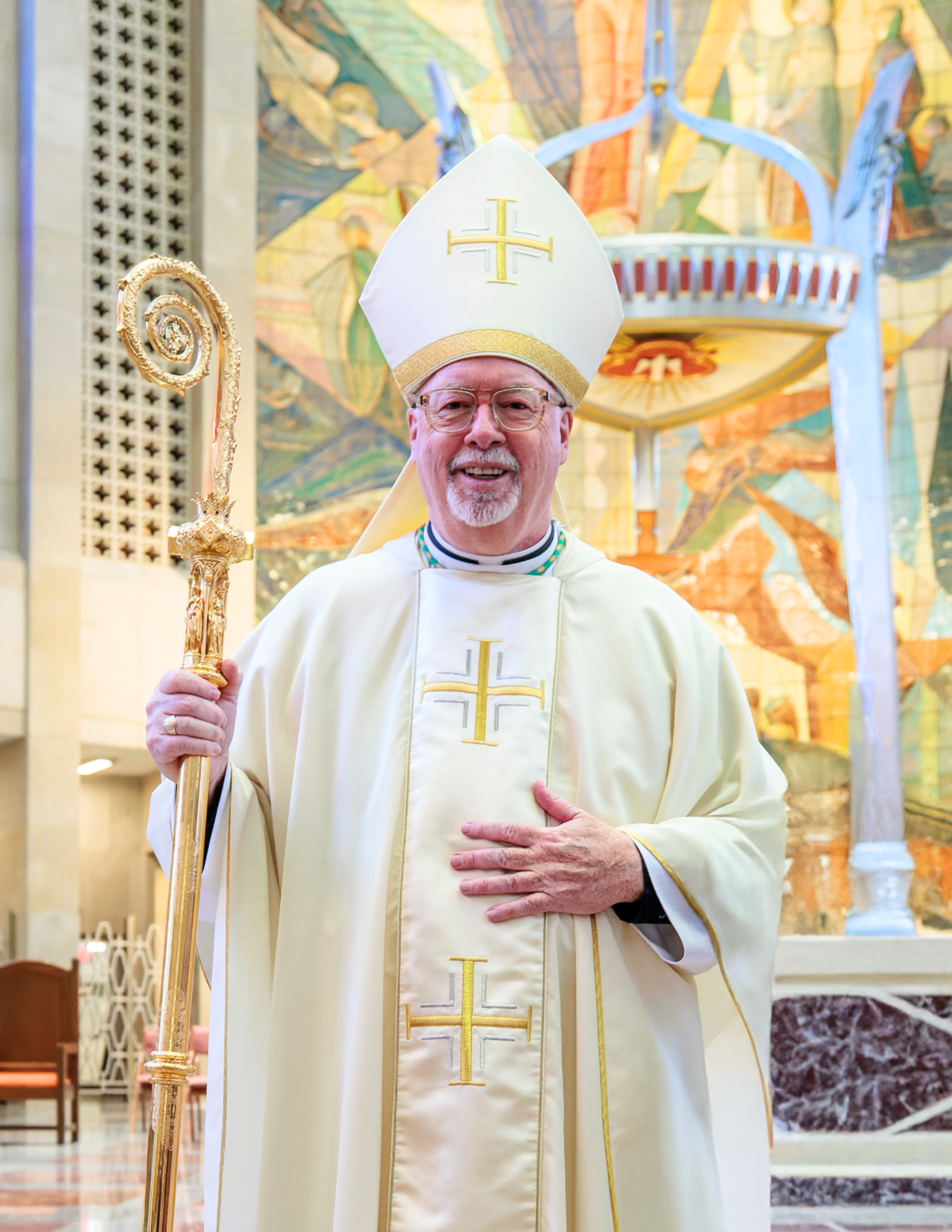
Bishop Coyne (2025)

Hart retired as bishop of Norwich in 2002. John Paul II appointed Bishop Michael Richard Côté from the Diocese of Portland as the fifth bishop of Norwich in March 2003. He was installed in May 2003.

In April 2010, Côté announced his opposition to a bill in the Connecticut General Assembly that would remove the statute of limitations for sexual abuse crimes. A letter signed by the Connecticut bishops said that this bill would cause tremendous damage to Catholic institutions and missions. In December 2010, Côté announced that he was replacing Haitian Ministries for the Diocese of Norwich with a new organization, Diocese of Norwich Outreach to Haiti, Inc. He mentioned that the diocese was slowly distributing $430,892 collected from parishioners in January 2010 to prevent waste and misappropriation. In 2013, the diocese closed the Mount St. John School due to reduced state funding and declining enrollment.

The diocese filed for Chapter II bankruptcy protection in July 2021. The diocese was facing civil liability due to dozens of sexual abuse lawsuits filed by former residents of the Mount St. John School. Pope Francis accepted Côté's resignation as bishop of Norwich in 2024, submitted on his 75th birthday as required. The pope appointed Archbishop Christopher J. Coyne of Hartford as apostolic administrator for the diocese.

In February 2025, Francis appointed Richard Francis Reidy of Worcester as the next bishop of Norwich. The diocese exited from bankruptcy in May 2025 after the court approved its reorganization plan.

== Reports of sex abuse ==
Paul Hebert Jr., a priest at Most Holy Trinity Parish in Pomfret, resigned his position in 2004. Jonathan Roy sued the diocese in 2016, stating that he had been sexually abused by Hebert hundreds of times from 1990 to 1996, starting when Roy was 11 years old. The diocese settled the lawsuit with Roy in March 2019, paying him $900,000.

More than 20 men sued the diocese in 2018, stating that they had been sexually abused when they were boys residing at the Mount St. John School. They named the perpetrators as two Xaverian brothers, Paul McGlade and Donald Paschal Alford.

In February 2019, Côté released a list of 43 clerics from the diocese with substantial allegations of abuse against them. Of the 43 clerics, 33 were deceased and the remainder were not performing ministry. He announced in July 2021 that the diocese was declaring Chapter 11 bankruptcy to facilitate settlement of sexual abuse lawsuits. By 2022, over 60 lawsuits had been filed against the diocese by former residents of Mount Saint John School.

In February 2025, as part of its bankruptcy reorganization plan, the diocese proposed the establishment of a $31 million trust fund for the victims of sexual abuse at Mount St. John School.

== Territory ==
The Diocese of Norwich consists of:

- The Connecticut counties of Middlesex, New London, Windham and Tolland
- Fishers Island in New York

== Bishops ==
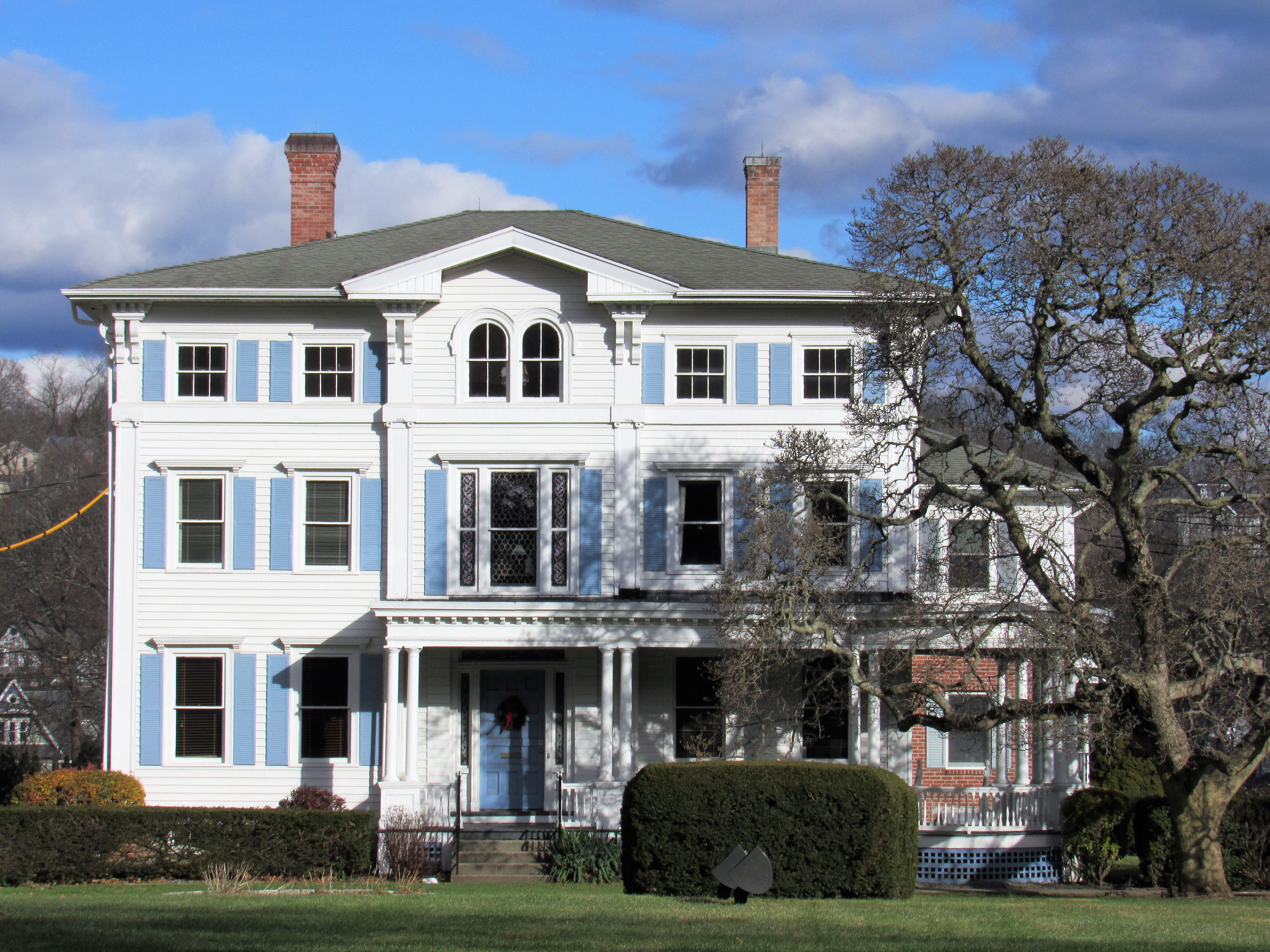
Chancery, Norwich (2019)

=== Bishops of Norwich ===
1. Bernard Joseph Flanagan (1953-1959), appointed Bishop of Worcester
2. Vincent Joseph Hines (1959-1975)
3. Daniel Patrick Reilly (1975-1994), appointed Bishop of Worcester
4. Daniel Anthony Hart (1995-2003)
5. Michael Richard Côté (2003–2024)
6. Richard Francis Reidy (2025-present)

=== Other diocesan priests who became bishop ===
- Paul S. Loverde, appointed Auxiliary Bishop of Hartford in 1988 and later Bishop of Ogdensburg and Bishop of Arlington
- Kevin Stuart Randall, appointed Apostolic Nuncio of Bangladesh in 2023

== Education ==
As of 2026, the Diocese of Norwich has four high schools and nine elementary/middle schools with an approximate enrollment of 3,500 students.

=== High schools ===
- Academy of the Holy Family – Baltic
- Marianapolis Preparatory School – Thompson
- Mercy High School – Middletown
- Saint Bernard School – Uncasville (6-12th grade) now an independent school
- Xavier High School – Middletown

=== Holy Apostles College and Seminary ===
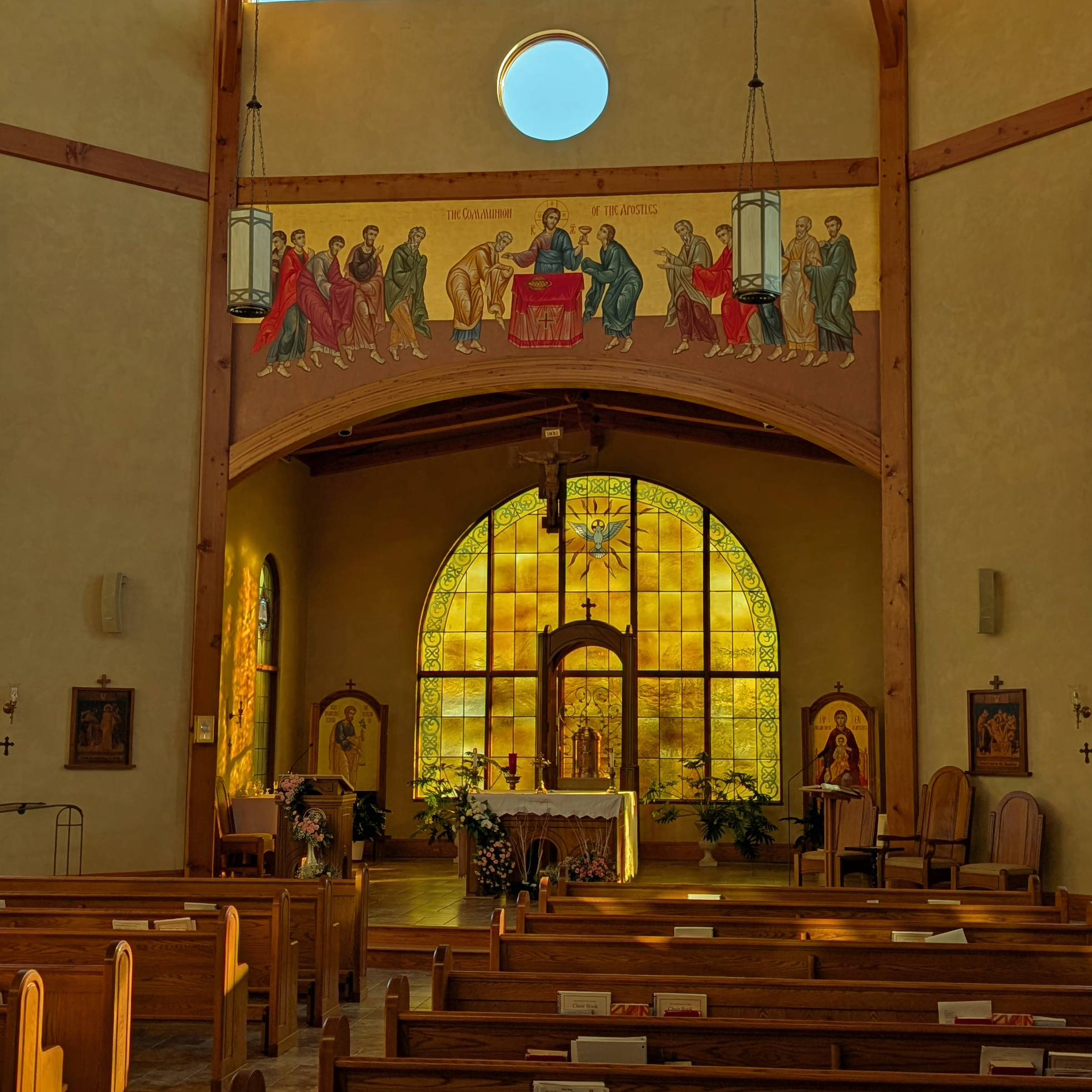
Holy Apostles Chapel

The Diocese of Norwich funds Holy Apostles College and Seminary in Cromwell, a two- and four-year institution that offers undergraduate and graduate degrees programs.
