= Robert Joseph McManus =

American prelate

His Excellency, The Most Reverend Robert Joseph McManus
- Bishop of Worcester
- Diocese: Diocese of Worcester
- Appointed: March 9, 2004
- Installed: May 14, 2004
- Predecessor: Daniel Patrick Reilly
- Previous post: Auxiliary Bishop of Providence (1999–2004)

Orders
- Ordination: May 27, 1978 by Kenneth Anthony Angell
- Consecration: February 22, 1999 by Kenneth Anthony Angell, Robert Edward Mulvee, and Louis Edward Gelineau

Personal details
- Born: July 5, 1951 (age 75) Providence, Rhode Island, U.S.
- Education: Catholic University of America (BA, MA); University of Toronto (MDiv); Pontifical Gregorian University (STL, STD)
- Motto: Christus veritatis splendor (Christ shines truth)

Styles of Robert Joseph McManus
- Reference style: His Excellency; The Most Reverend
- Spoken style: Your Excellency
- Religious style: Bishop

Robert Joseph McManus (born July 5, 1951) is an American prelate of the Catholic Church who has been bishop of the Diocese of Worcester in Massachusetts since 2004. He was an auxiliary bishop of the Diocese of Providence in Rhode Island from 1999 to 2004.

== Biography ==
=== Early life and education ===
Robert McManus was born on July 5, 1951, in Providence, Rhode Island, to Edward and Helen (née King) McManus. He grew up in the Providence area, graduating from Blessed Sacrament School and Our Lady of Providence Seminary high school in Warwick, Rhode Island.

After graduating from high school, McManus entered Catholic University of America in Washington, D.C., obtaining a bachelor's degree and a master's degree. He then began attending the Toronto School of Theology of the University of Toronto in 1974, earning a Master of Divinity degree. After his ordination as deacon and earning a Licentiate of Sacred Theology and a Doctor of Sacred Theology from Pontifical Gregorian University, McManus served for a year as deacon at Our Lady of Mercy Parish in East Greenwich, Rhode Island.

=== Priesthood ===
On May 27, 1978, McManus was ordained to the priesthood for the Diocese of Providence by Bishop Kenneth Anthony Angell. Following his ordination, the diocese assigned McManus as temporary assistant chaplain at Saint Joseph's Hospital in Providence along with a posting as associate pastor at St. Matthew Parish in Cranston, Rhode Island. He was moved to Providence in 1981 to serve as associate pastor at St. Anthony Parish. McManus also worked as the chaplain at the Community College of Rhode Island (CCRI) during this period.

In 1984, the diocese sent McManus to Rome, where he earned a licentiate and Doctor of Sacred Theology degree from the Pontifical Gregorian University. In November 1987, McManus returned to Rhode Island; Bishop Louis Edward Gelineau appointed him as vicar for education and director of the office of ministerial formation. In July 1987, McManus was appointed pastor of St. Luke Parish in Barrington, Rhode Island. In 1990, the diocese appointed McManus as a consultant and editorial writer for The Providence Visitor newspaper.

McManus was elevated to the title of monsignor on February 28, 1997, by Pope John Paul II. In June 1998, McManus left St. Luke after Bishop Robert Edward Mulvee named him as rector of Our Lady of Providence Seminary. During this time, McManus also provided pastoral coverage at St. Margaret Parish in Rumford, Rhode Island.

=== Auxiliary Bishop of Providence ===
On December 1, 1998, John Paul II appointed McManus as auxiliary bishop of Providence and titular bishop of Allegheny. He was consecrated on February 22, 1999, by Bishop Robert Edward Mulvee, with Bishops Kenneth Anthony Angell and Gelineau serving as co-consecrators, at the Cathedral of Saints Peter and Paul in Providence. As auxiliary bishop, McManus continued as rector at Our Lady and secretary for ministerial formation.

=== Bishop of Worcester ===
On March 9, 2004, John Paul II appointed McManus as bishop of Worcester. He was installed on May 14, 2004, succeeding Bishop Daniel Patrick Reilly, who retired.

In 2007, McManus criticized the College of the Holy Cross in Worcester for renting out "sacred space" to the Massachusetts Alliance on Teen Pregnancy for workshops. He said that the Alliance taught subjects that violated the teachings of the Catholic Church. On October 10, 2007, McManus stated that the college might lose its designation as a Catholic institution. Holy Cross President Michael C. McFarland said that the college had contractual obligations to the Alliance and would not cancel its agreement.

In April 2012, McManus asked Anna Maria College in Paxton, Massachusetts, to rescind an invitation to attorney Victoria Kennedy to speak at its commencement ceremony, citing her views on abortion rights for women and same sex marriage. On May 4, 2012, the college agreed to disinvite Kennedy, but also rescinded its commencement invitation to McManus, stating that his presence at the ceremony would be a "distraction".

McManus was arrested on May 4, 2013, in Narragansett, Rhode Island, for drunken driving, leaving the scene of an accident, and refusing a chemical sobriety test. At 10:30 pm, McManus had been involved in a crash with another vehicle, then fled the scene. The other driver followed him and called the police. They arrested McManus 20 minutes later at his family home in Narragansett. McManus, a Rhode Island native, shares a family home with his siblings in Narragansett. He later stated:

I made a terrible error in judgment by driving after having consumed alcohol with dinner. There is no excuse for the mistake I made, only a commitment to make amends and accept the consequences of my action. More importantly, I ask forgiveness from the good people whom I serve, as well as my family and friends, in the Diocese of Worcester and the Diocese of Providence.

On August 25, 2020, Pope Francis appointed McManus as apostolic administrator for the Diocese of Springfield in Massachusetts while continuing as bishop of Worcester. The diocese had become "vacant" with the appointment of Bishop Mitchell T. Rozanski as archbishop of St. Louis. McManus's term as apostolic administrator ended on December 14, 2020, with the installation of a new bishop in Springfield.

On October 1, 2020, McManus and diocese were named in a sexual abuse lawsuit filed by a former parishioner. The plaintiff alleged that Reverend Thomas E. Mahoney had groomed and abused him and other boys in the early 1970s at various locations in Worcester and Boylston, Massachusetts. The lawsuit accused the diocese of failing to stop Mahoney's alleged crimes. After the lawsuit was filed, McManus suspended Mahoney, who had already retired, from any ministerial duties.

== Viewpoints ==
=== School autonomy ===
==== Nativity School ====
On April 3, 2022, McManus asked the Nativity School of Worcester, a Jesuit middle school in Worcester, Massachusetts, to remove the Black Lives Matter and gay pride flags from their flagpole, saying that they raised confusion about church teachings. McManus threatened to remove the school's designation as a Catholic school if it did not comply. The Nativity School administration refused to remove the flags.

As a multicultural school, the flags represent the inclusion and respect of all people. These flags simply state that all are welcome at Nativity and this value of inclusion is rooted in Catholic teaching.

In June 2022, McManus proclaimed that Nativity School could no longer call itself "Catholic". In response, Nativity School noted that Pope Francis has "praised the outreach and inclusion of LGBTQ+ people" and that the United States Conference of Catholic Bishops "supports the spirit and movement" of Black Lives Matter. Nativity School said it would appeal McManus' declaration to the Vatican and continue flying the two flags. In June 2025 the school's board of trustees voted unanimously to declare itself an independent school, separating itself from the Catholic Church and the Jesuit order.

==== St. John's and Notre Dame schools ====
In August 2023, McManus enacted a new diocesan policy regarding LGBTQ+ expression by students in Catholic schools in the diocese:

“Students may not advocate, celebrate, or express same-sex attraction in such a way as to cause confusion or distraction in the context of Catholic school classes, activities, or events.”

The Xaverian Brothers, who operated St. John’s High School in Shrewsbury, Massachusetts, and the Sisters of Notre Dame de Namur, representing Notre Dame Academy in Worcester, refused to add the new policy. Their spokespersons said that the existing school policies already addressed these issues.

=== LGBTQ+ rights ===
In June 2012, diocesan officials declined to sell Oakhurst, an historic mansion in Northbridge, Massachusetts, to James Fairbanks and Alain Beret, a married gay couple. The diocese had used Oakhurst as a retreat center. In September 2012, the couple sued McManus and the diocese for discrimination. The plaintiffs cited an email in which church officials said that McManus wanted to stop the sale "because of the potentiality of gay marriages there." On October 12, 2012, the diocese sold Oakhurst to a different buyer.

During the Oakhurst lawsuit, a diocese lawyer claimed that the Massachusetts anti-discrimination statute provides an exemption for religious institutions. He said: "If a religious entity did not have to permit property to be used for gay weddings, which we all agree, why must religious property be sold to an organization if it is going to be used for a gay wedding?" In March 2014, Massachusetts Attorney General Martha Coakley filed a legal brief supporting the plaintiffs. The brief said,

"We believe that this family was unfairly discriminated against by the diocese when it refused to sell them property based on their sexual orientation.... And no reasonable person would think that a wedding that took place on a property no longer owned by a church was endorsed by that church."

Oral arguments in the Oakhurst case were scheduled in Worcester Superior Court on April 22, 2014.

Catholic Church titles
Preceded by Daniel Patrick Reilly	Bishop of Worcester; 2004–present	Succeeded by incumbent
Preceded by –	Auxiliary Bishop of Providence; 1999–2004	Succeeded by –
