= Cathedral of Saint Patrick (Norwich, Connecticut) =

Historic church in Connecticut, United States

Cathedral of St. Patrick
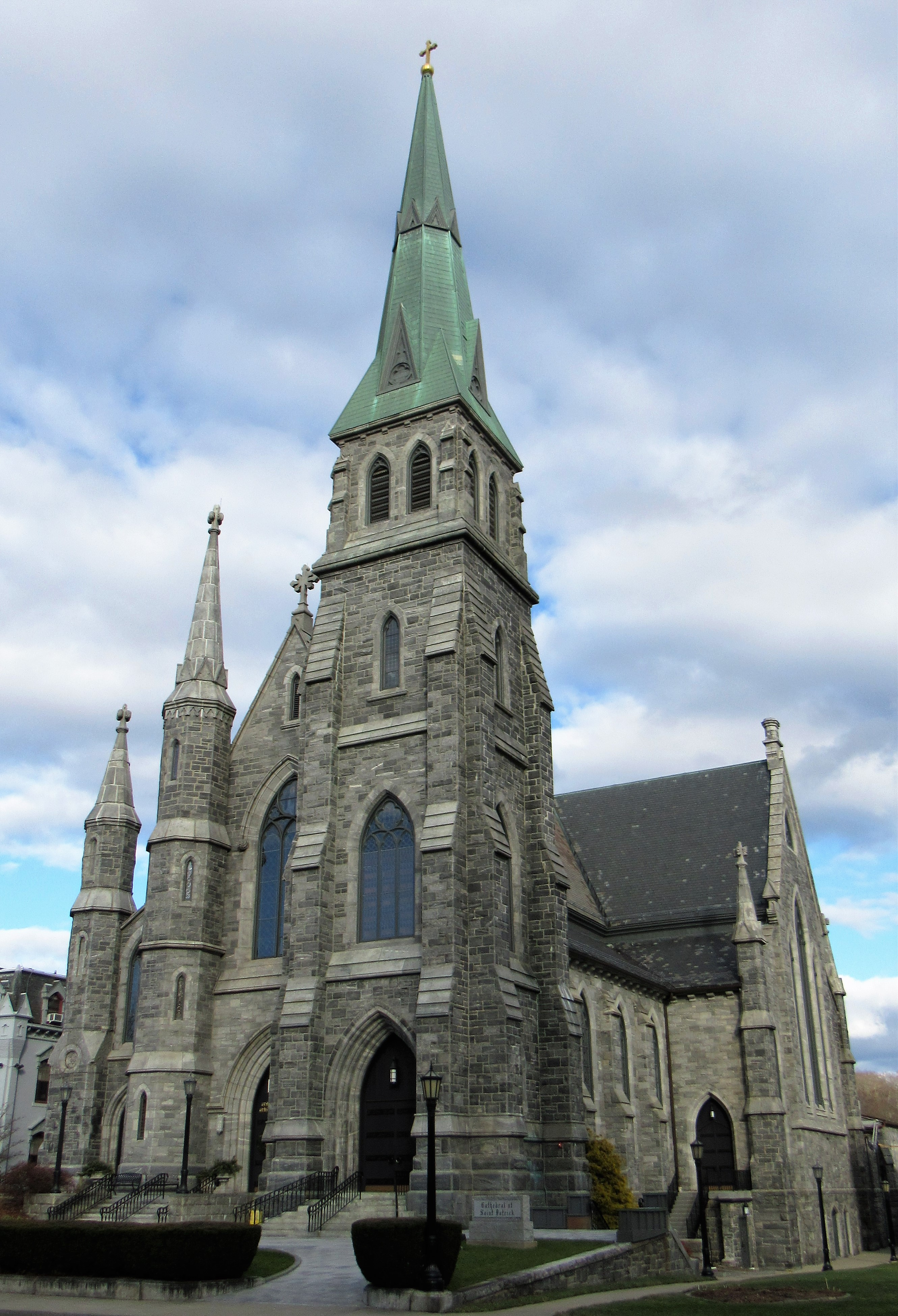

- Location within Connecticut
- 41°31′51.86″N 72°04′40.24″W
- Location: 211 Broadway; Norwich, Connecticut
- Country: United States
- Denomination: Roman Catholic
- Website: www.cathedralofsaintpatrick.org

History
- Status: Cathedral/Parish church
- Dedication: Saint Patrick

Architecture
- Architect: James Murphy
- Style: Gothic Revival
- Groundbreaking: 1873
- Completed: 1879

Specifications
- Materials: Limestone

Administration
- Diocese: Norwich

Clergy
- Bishop: Most Rev. Richard Francis Reidy
- Rector: Msgr. Anthony Rosaforte
- St. Patrick’s Church, Rectory, and School
- U.S. Historic district – Contributing property
- Part of: Chelsea Parade Historic District (ID88003215)
- Added to NRHP: May 12, 1989

The Cathedral of Saint Patrick is a cathedral of the Roman Catholic Church located in Norwich, Connecticut., in the United States. It is the mother church of the Diocese of Norwich and is the seat of its prelate bishop.

== Parish history ==
=== St. Mary's Church ===
The first Catholic Church in the Norwich area of coastal Connecticut was St. Mary's Church in Norwich. At that time, all of the Catholics in New England were under the jurisdiction of the Diocese of Boston. The diocese in 1833 sent the priest James Fitton to Norwich to establish a parish for the Irish immigrants work in the local textile mills.

Fitton celebrated the first mass in Norwich in a third floor loft with 12 people in attendance. By 1842, Fitton was using a shed in Twomeytown for services. In November 1843, the Vatican erected the Diocese of Hartford, with jurisdiction for all of Connecticut and Rhode Island. Fitton in September 1844 purchased a lot in the center of Norwich to build a church. St. Mary's was dedicated in March 1845.

By the late 1860s, St. Mary's was becoming overcrowded. The pastor, James Mullen, decided to build a new church near a wealthy section of town so as to be accessible to the numerous Irish immigrants working there as servants. He hire the architect James Murphy of Providence, Rhode Island to design new church, which would be called St. Patrick's. In April 1873, a group of Irish laborers arrived at the project site and dug the church foundation, using picks and shovels."The cornerstone of the church was laid in July 1873; parishioners paid ten cents a week to finance the church construction.

=== St. Patrick's Church ===
St. Patrick's Parish was incorporated in 1878 and its church was dedicated on September 28, 1879. St. Mary's Church closed later that year. During 1938 New England hurricane.that ravaged Connecticut and Rhode Island, St. Patrick's Church suffered some damage.

=== Cathedral of St. Patrick ===
In 1953, Pope Pius XII erected the Diocese of Norwich and designated St. Patrick's Church as the Cathedral of St. Patrick.

A major renovation of the Cathedral of St. Patrick commenced in 2010. The diocese added new murals and decorations to the interior of the cathedral. The lighting system was also modernized. The project was finished in 2013. The change moved the tabernacle behind the altar and the episcopal chair to the side. The diocese in March 2026 began a project to disassemble the two bell towers, then rebuild them using the same stone.

Cathedral campus images

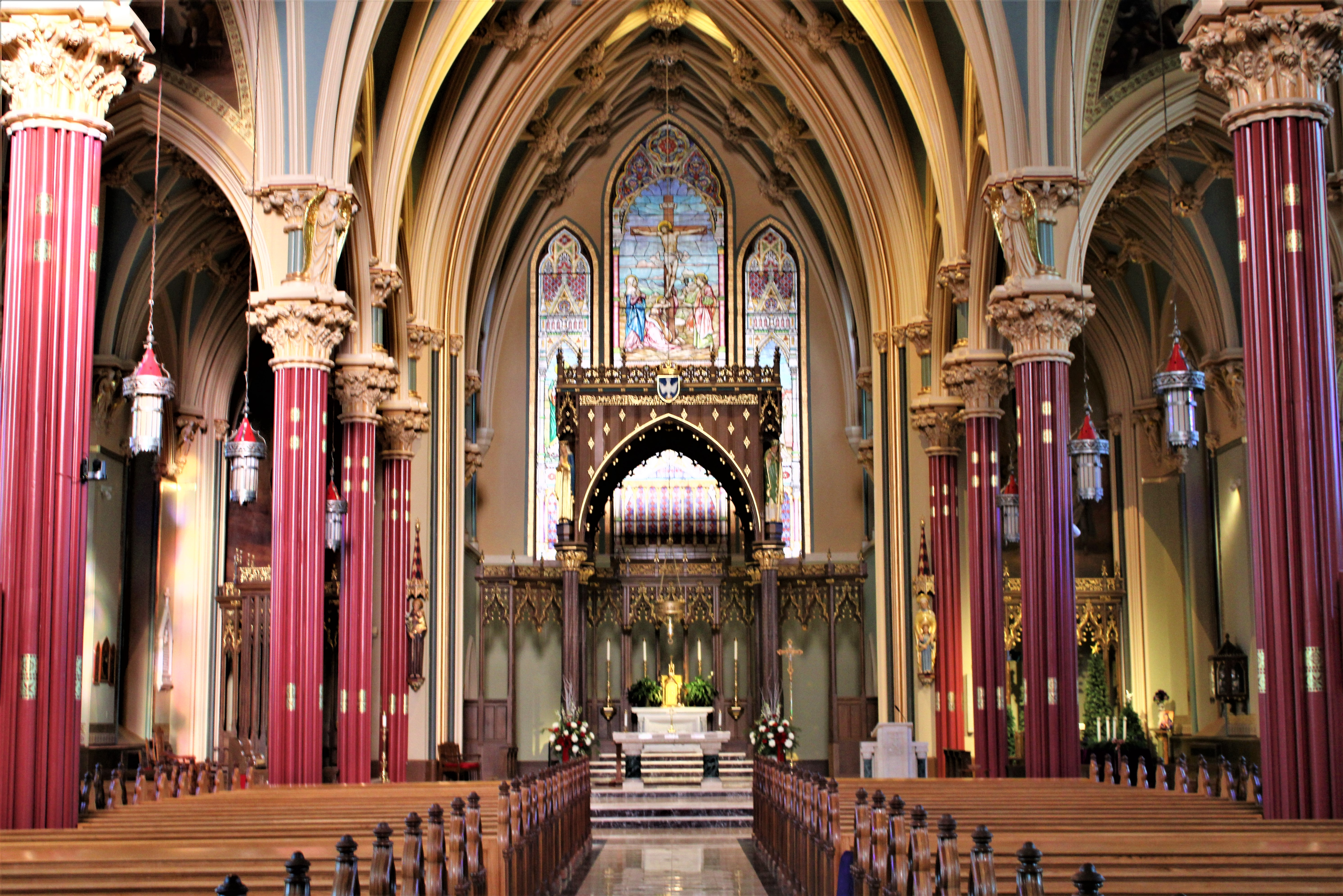
View from nave to altar 2021)

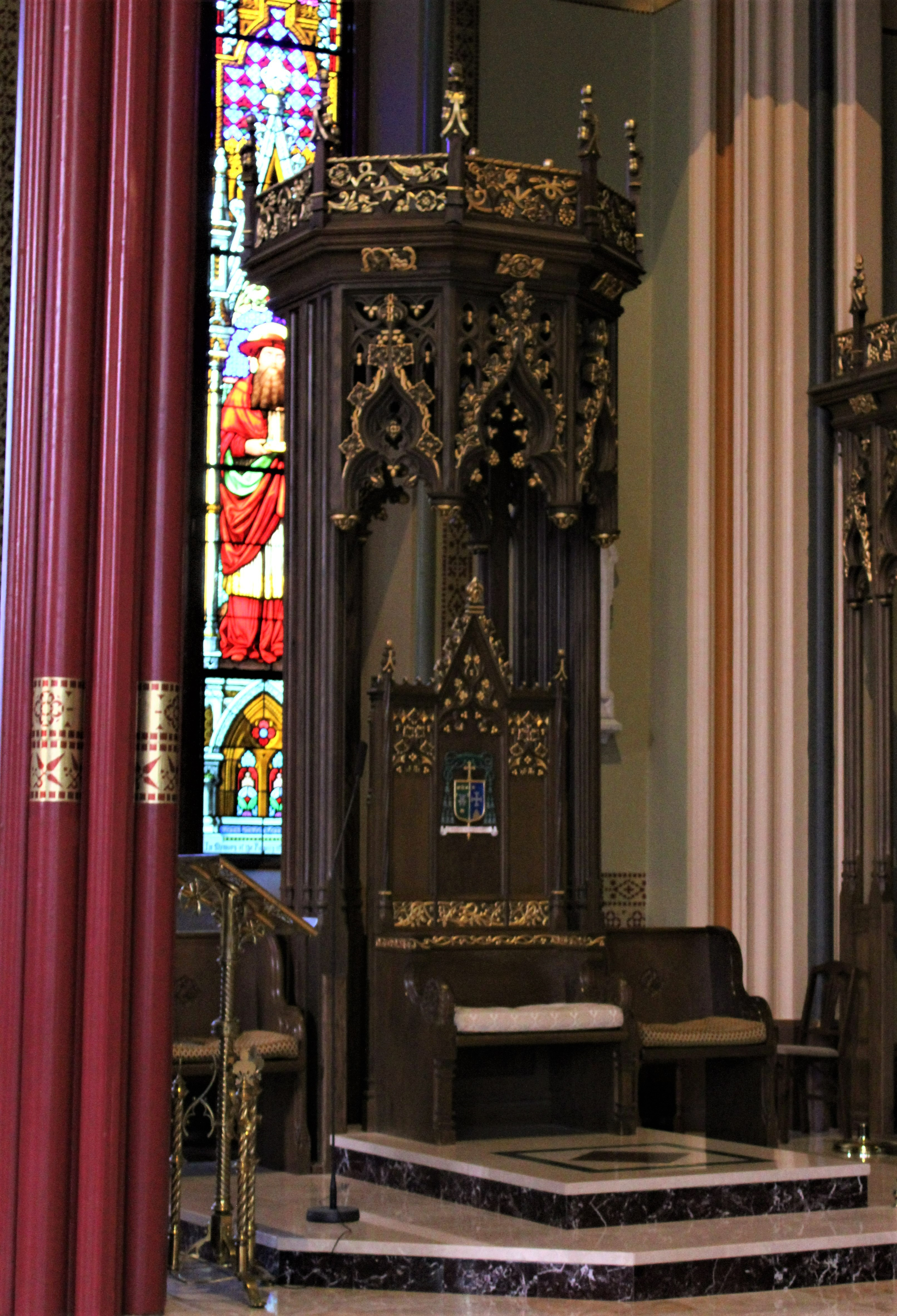
Cathedra in cathedral (2021)

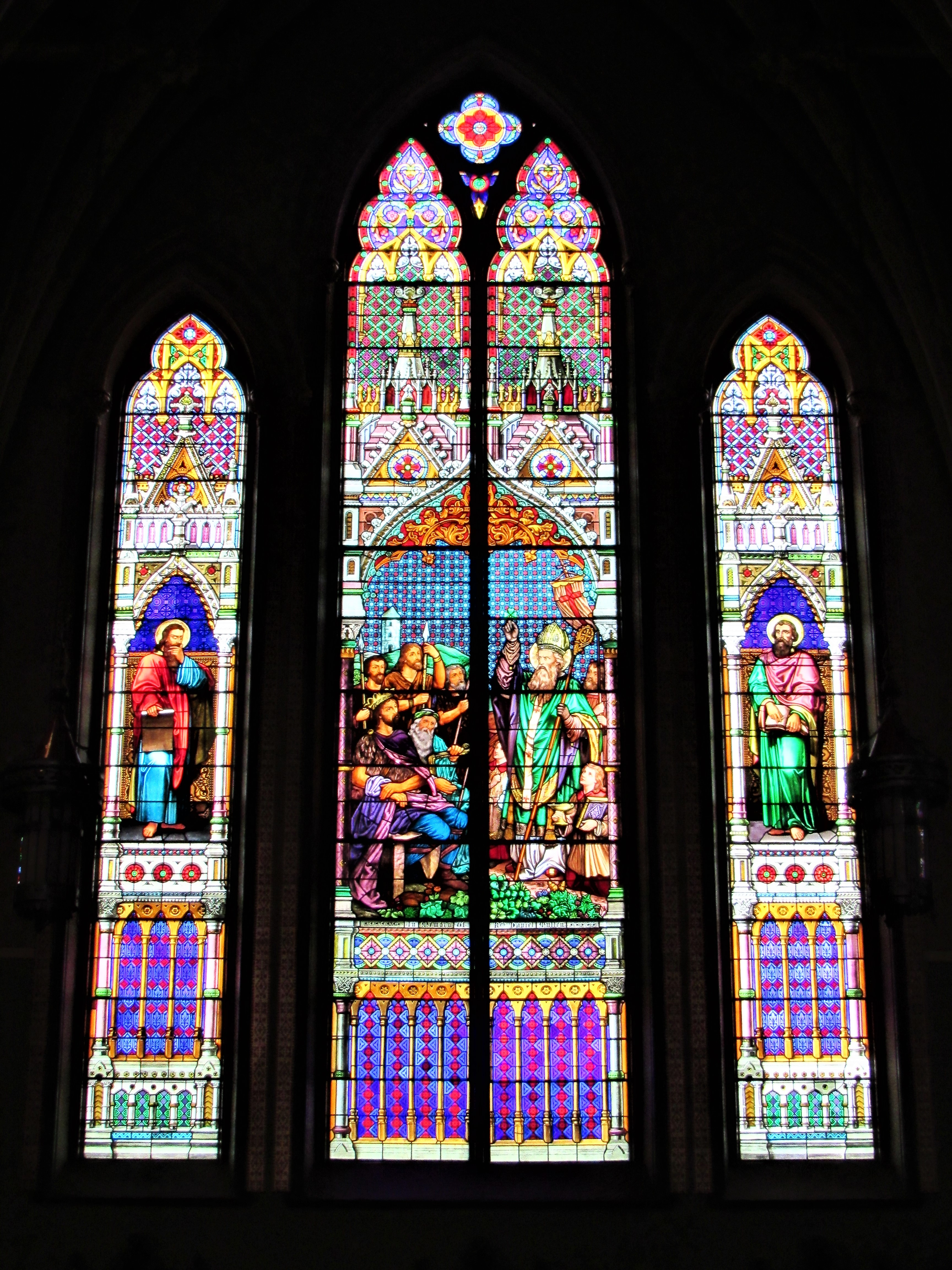
St. Patrick stained glass window (2019)

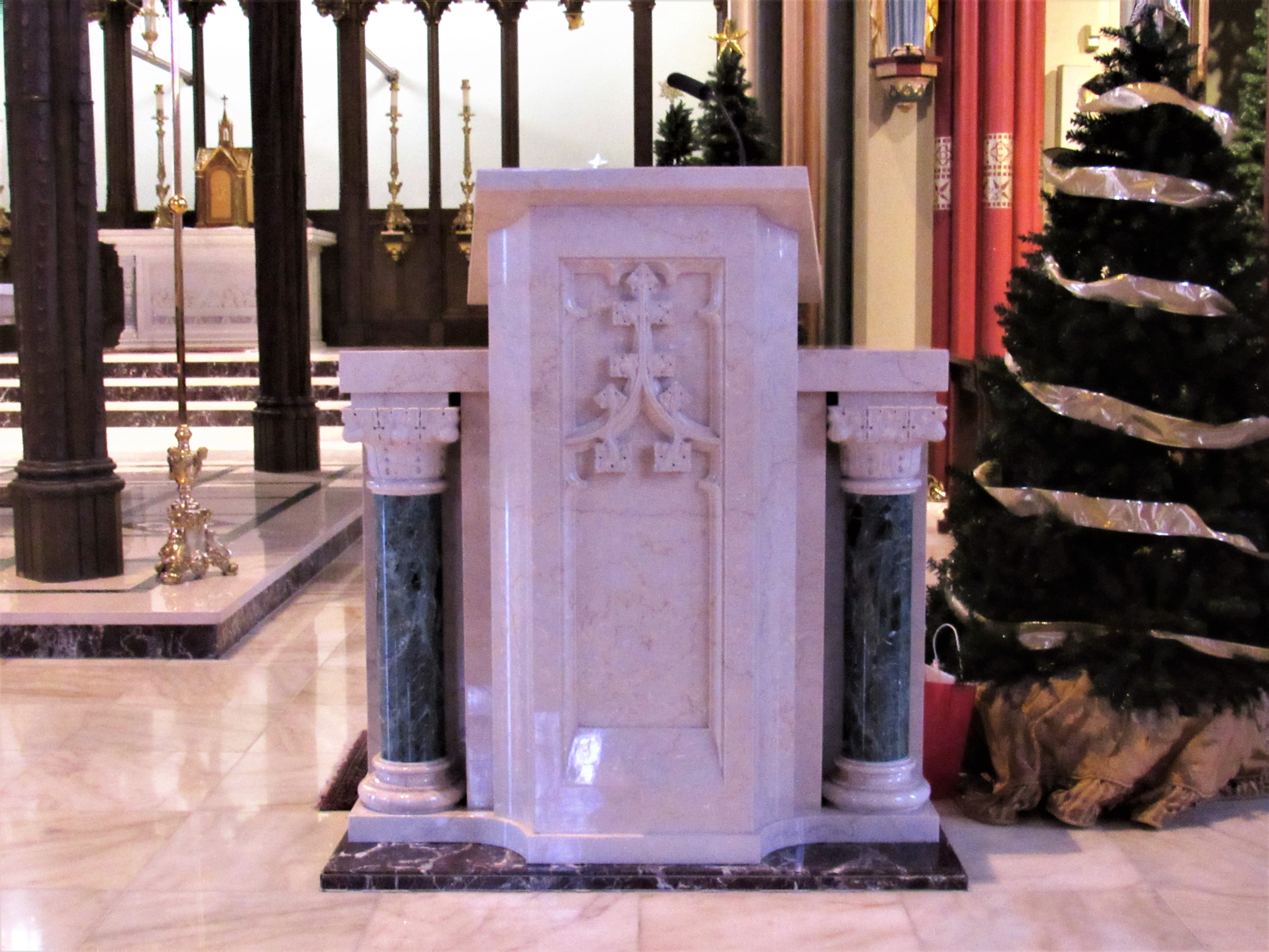
Ambo in cathedral (2019)

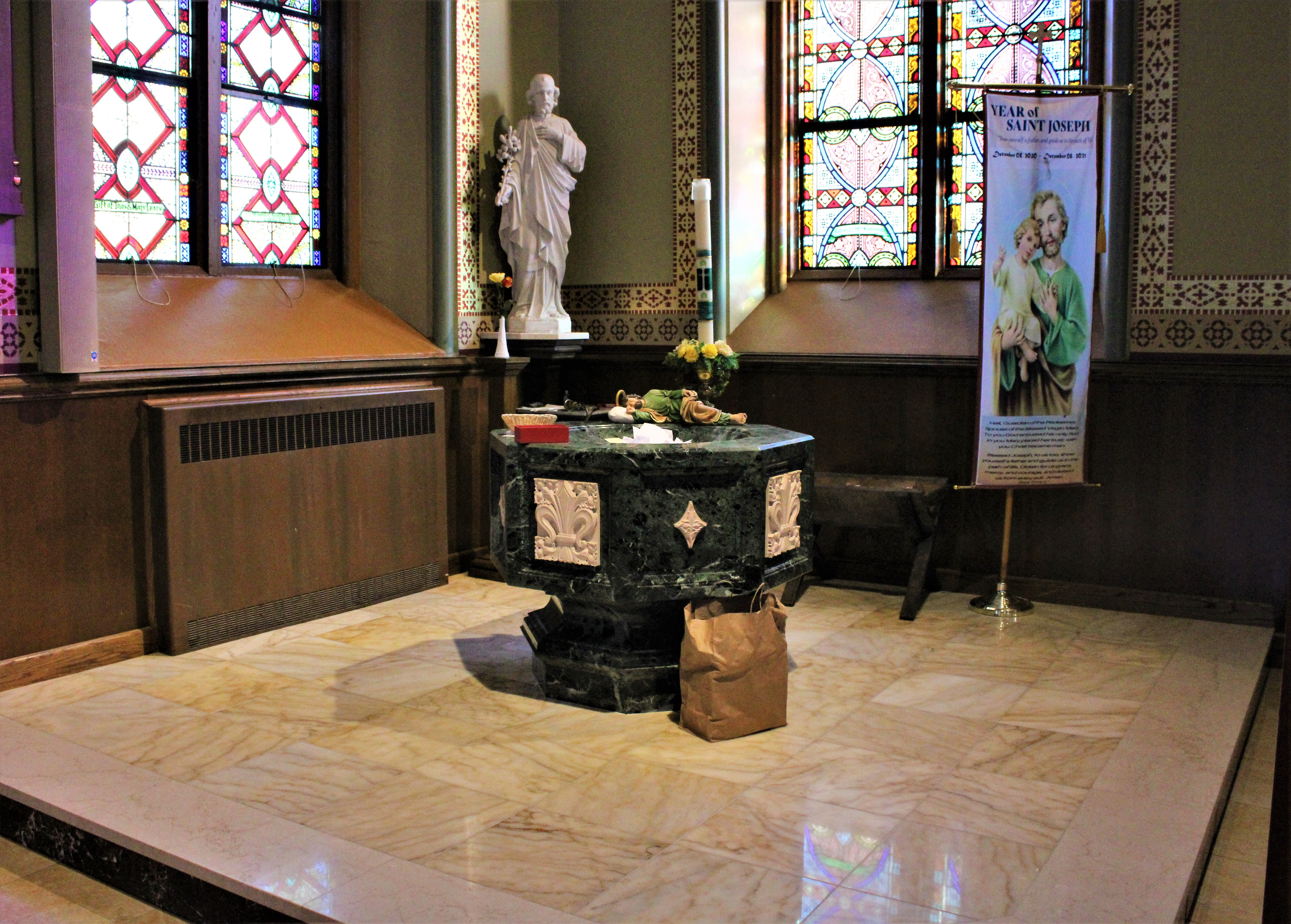
Baptismal font in cathedral (2021)

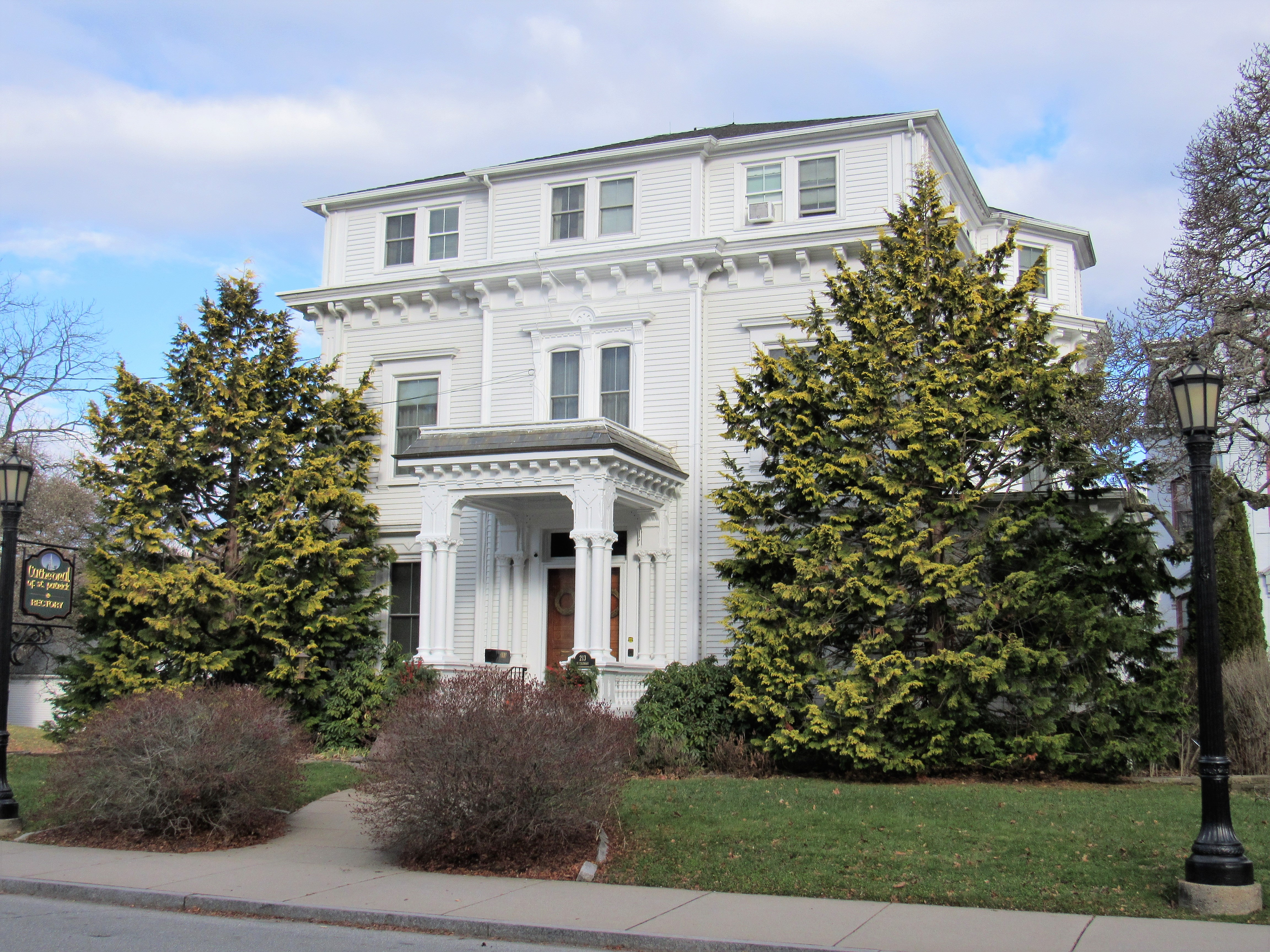
Rectory (2019)

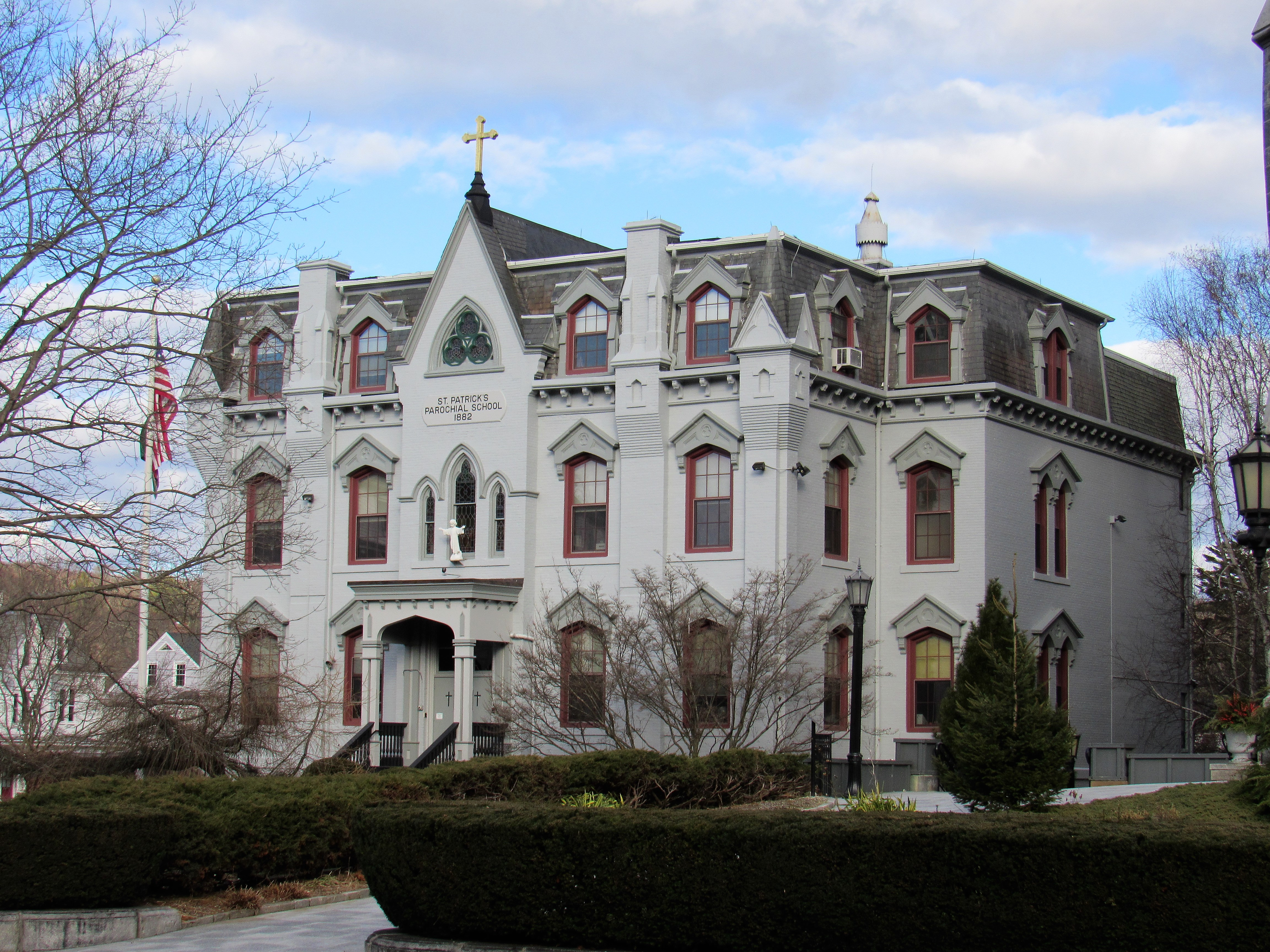
School (2019)

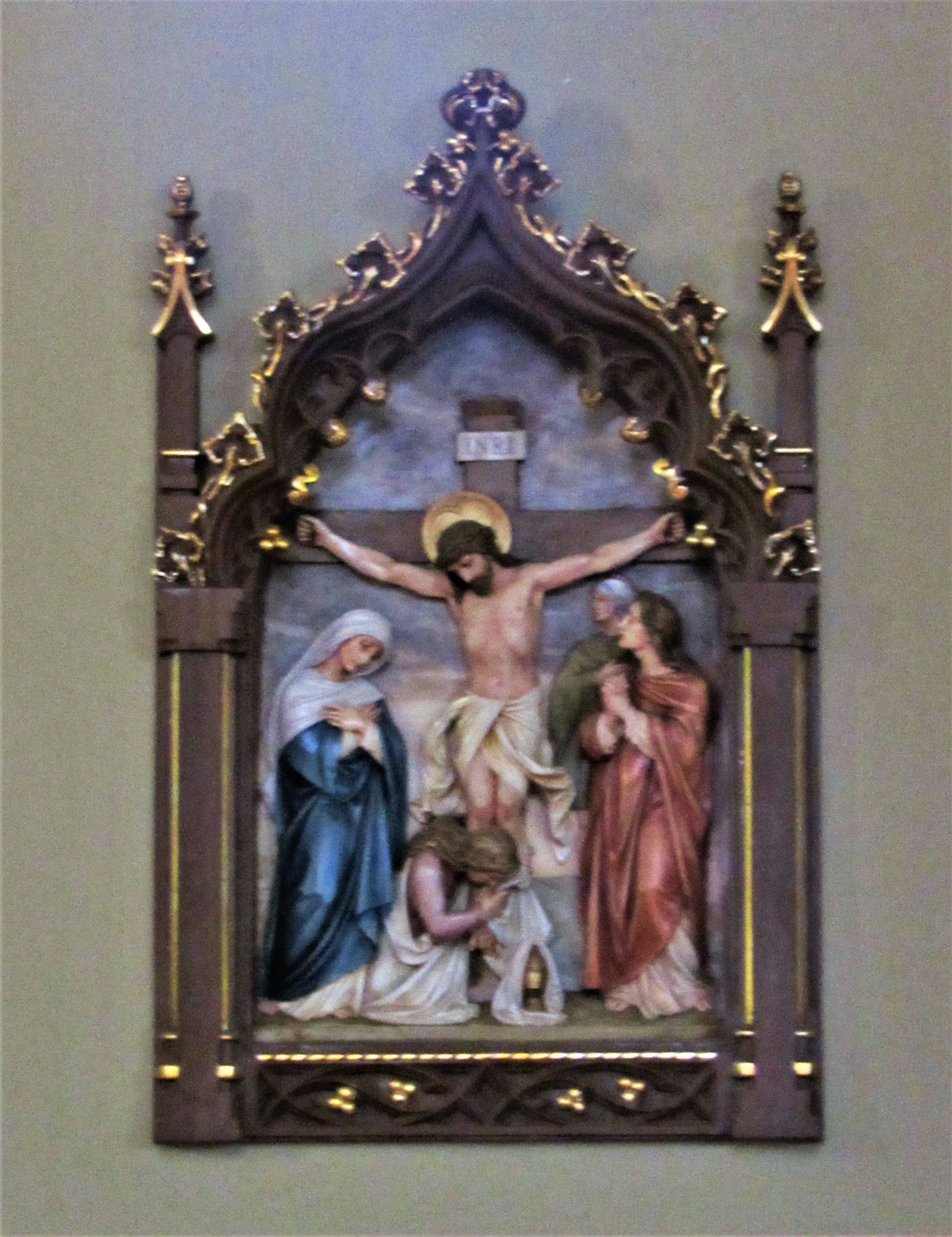
Station XII, Stations of the Cross in cathedral (2019)

== See also ==
- List of Catholic cathedrals in the United States
- List of tallest buildings in Connecticut
