= Mercy High School (Connecticut) =

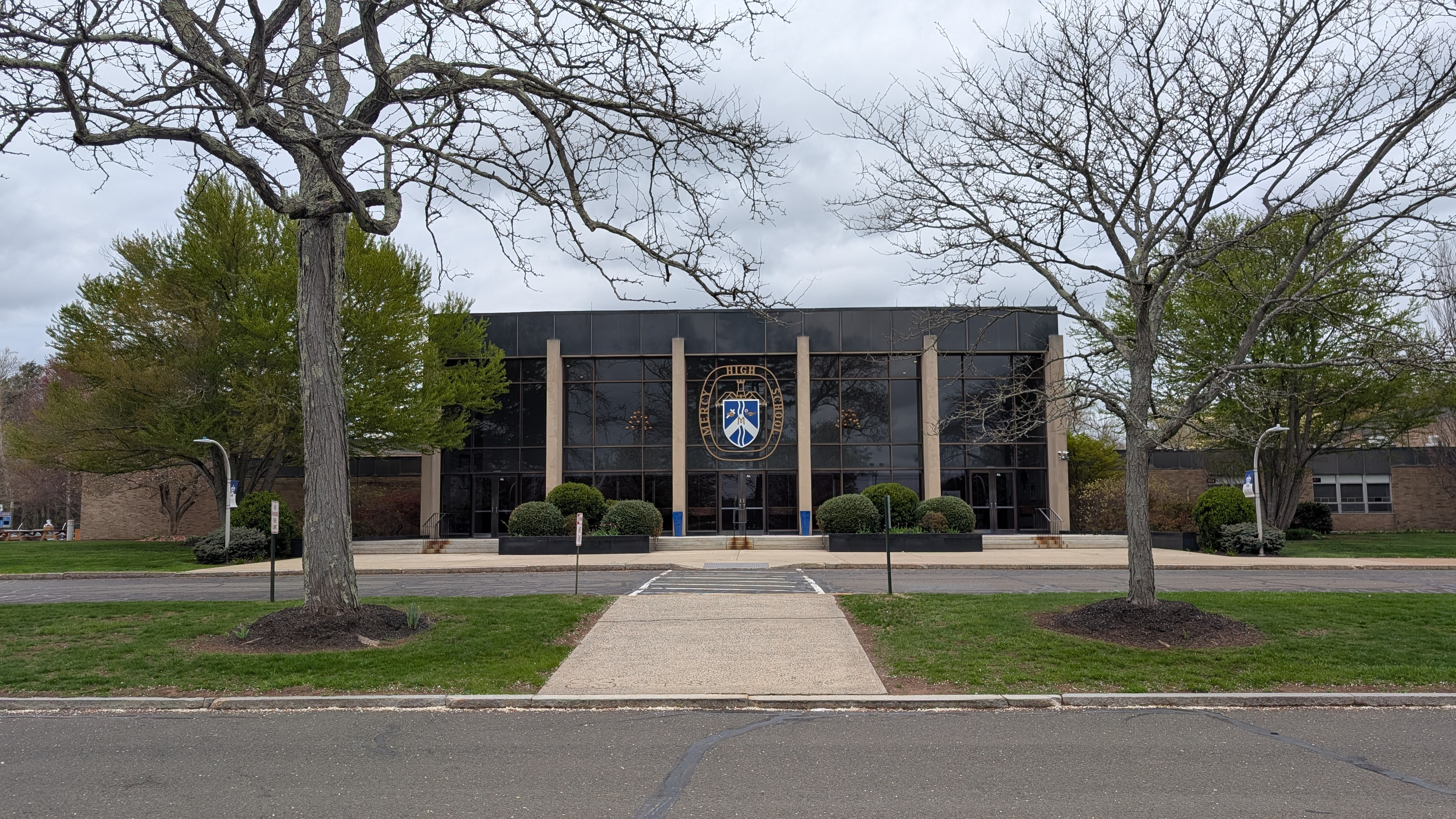

Location
- 1740 Randolph Road; Middletown, Middlesex County, Connecticut 06457-5155; United States
- Coordinates: 41°31′57″N 72°40′33″W

Information
- Type: Private, all-girls
- Religious affiliation: Roman Catholic
- Established: 1963
- CEEB code: 070398
- President: Alissa K. DeJonge
- Grades: 9–12
- Athletics conference: Southern Connecticut Conference
- Accreditation: New England Association of Schools and Colleges
- Website: www.mercyhigh.com

Mercy High School is a private, Roman Catholic, all-girls high school in Middletown, Connecticut located within the Roman Catholic Diocese of Norwich. The student population of Mercy High School is 405. The school's minority student enrollment is 22.2% and the student-teacher ratio is 14:1. They have many sports that are in the SCC conference in CT.

== History ==
The school was founded in 1963 when the bishop of Norwich invited the Sisters of Mercy to run an all-girls school.

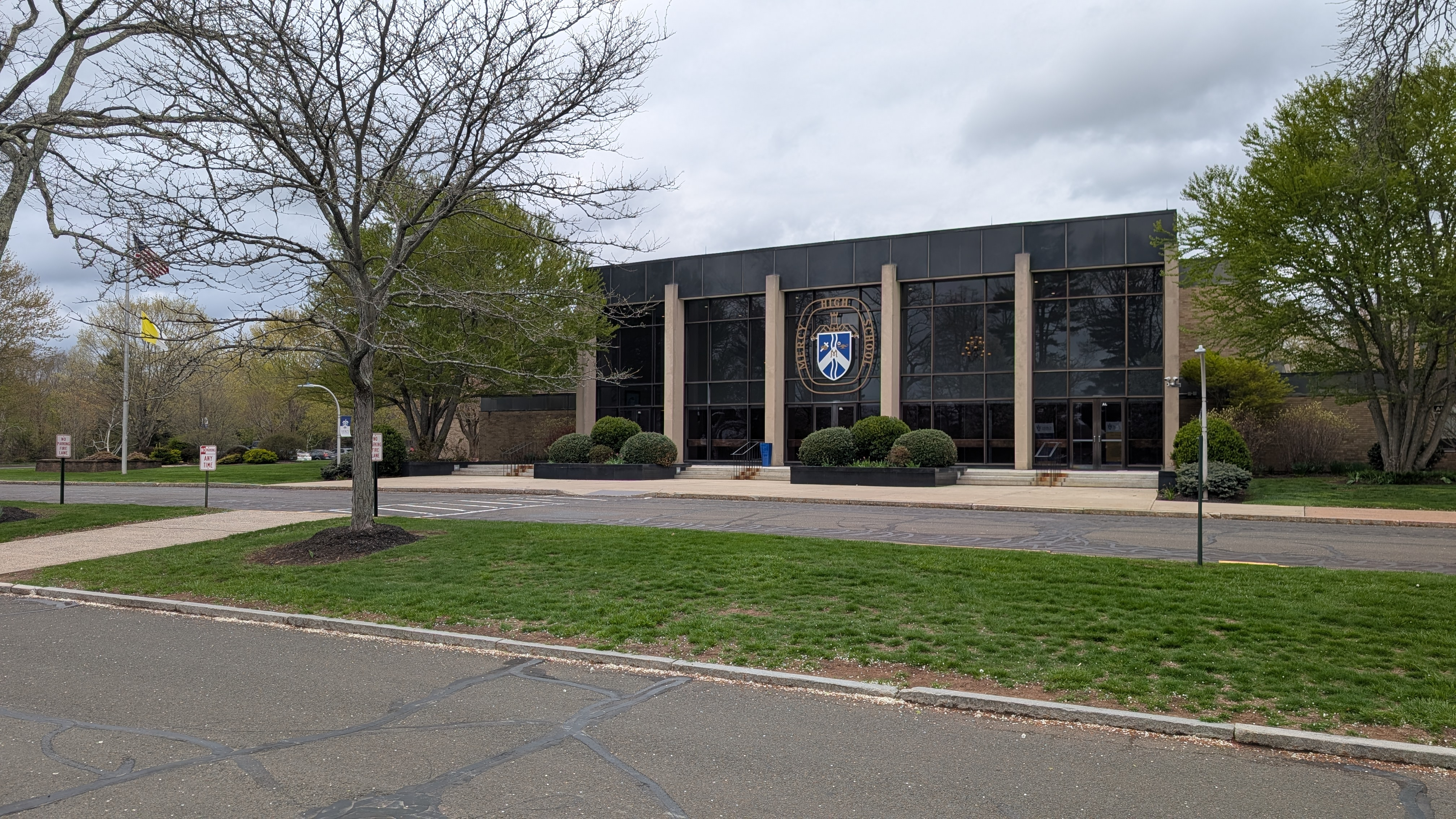
Front of Mercy High School

In 2018 a petition was made to allow same-sex couples to attend the school dance. Despite coverage on the topic from the Middletown Press and the Hartford Courant, as well as support from the students and their creation of a change.org petition, the issue ultimately went unresolved by the school. The petition received over 1,800 signatures in 2 days, but was taken down by the student due to the administration "strongly advising me to give it up," per a note by the petitioner.
