= Edward Cornelius O'Leary =

American Catholic prelate (1920–2002)

His Excellency, The Most Reverend Edward Cornelius O'Leary
- Bishop of Portland
- Church: Catholic Church; Latin Church
- Diocese: Portland
- Appointed: October 16, 1974
- Installed: December 18, 1974
- Retired: September 27, 1988
- Predecessor: Peter Leo Gerety
- Successor: Joseph John Gerry, O.S.B.
- Other post: Bishop Emeritus of Portland (1988‍–‍2002)
- Previous posts: Auxiliary Bishop of Portland (1971‍–‍1974); Titular Bishop of Moglaena (1971‍–‍1974)

Personal details
- Born: August 21, 1920 Bangor, Maine, U.S.
- Died: April 2, 2002 (aged 81) Portland, Maine
- Education: College of the Holy Cross (AB); St. Paul's Seminary (LST)
- Motto: One who serves

Ordination history
History
Priestly ordination
- Ordained by: Joseph Edward McCarthy
Episcopal consecration
- Principal consecrator: Peter Leo Gerety
- Co-consecrators: Bernard Joseph Flanagan, Lawrence Preston Joseph Graves
Episcopal succession
Bishops consecrated by Edward Cornelius O'Leary as principal consecrator
- Amédée Wilfrid Proulx: November 12, 1975

Edward Cornelius O'Leary (August 21, 1920 – April 2, 2002) was an American prelate of the Catholic Church. He served as bishop of the Latin Church diocese of Portland in Maine from 1974 to 1988 and as auxiliary bishop of the same diocese from 1970 to 1974

== Biography ==
=== Early life ===
Edward O'Leary was born on August 21, 1920, in Bangor, Maine, in 1920. He studied at the College of the Holy Cross in Worcester, Massachusetts, obtaining his bachelor's degree. He then attended St. Paul's Seminary in Ottawa, Ontario, where he received a Licentiate of Sacred Theology.

=== Priesthood ===
O'Leary was ordained to the priesthood in Portland, Maine, for the Diocese of Portland by Bishop Joseph McCarthy on June 15, 1946. He was assigned as a curate at the Cathedral of the Immaculate Conception Parish, then served at Sacred Heart Parish in Portland and at St. Margaret's Parish in Old Orchard Beach, Maine. O'Leary was named chancellor of the diocese, and a domestic prelate by Pope John XXIII in 1959. O'Leary served as pastor of St. Charles Borromeo Parish in Brunswick, Maine, from 1967 to 1971.

=== Auxiliary Bishop of Portland ===
On November 16, 1970, O'Leary was appointed auxiliary bishop of Portland and titular bishop of Moglaena by Pope Paul VI. He received his episcopal consecration on January 25, 1971, from Bishop Peter Gerety, with bishops Bernard Flanagan and Lawrence Graves serving as co-consecrators, at the Cathedral of the Immaculate Conception in Portland.

=== Bishop of Portland ===
Following the promotion of Bishop Gerety to Archbishop of Newark in New Jersey in April 1974, Paul VI appointed O'Leary as the ninth bishop of Portland on October 16, 1974. He was installed on December 18, 1974.

During his tenure, O'Leary was forced to address the problems of an increasing population but a decline in priestly vocations. He encouraged the greater involvement of laity and women in church administration, and developed a system of parish councils. The diocese also joined the Maine Council of Churches during this time. O'Leary took frequent public stands on a number of social issues of importance to the Catholic Church, endorsing a referendum on pornography and opposing the Maine Equal Rights Amendment (which he believed would enforce taxpayer-funded abortions). He also worked to assist HIV/AIDS victims through the Church's social services program. It was also customary for O'Leary to visit all the hospitals every Christmas Day.

=== Death and legacy ===
On September 27, 1988, Pope John Paul II accepted O'Leary's resignation as bishop of Portland. Edward O'Leary died in Portland on April 2, 2002, at age 81.

== See also ==
- Catholic Church in the United States
- Hierarchy of the Catholic Church
- Historical list of the Catholic bishops of the United States
- List of Catholic bishops in the United States

Catholic Church titles
| Preceded by Peter Leo Gerety | Bishop of Portland; 1974–1988 | Succeeded by Joseph John Gerry, O.S.B. |
