= Louis Sebastian Walsh =

American prelate (1858–1924)

His Excellency, The Right Reverend Louis Sebastian Walsh
- Bishop of Portland
- Church: Roman Catholic Church
- See: Diocese of Portland
- In office: October 18, 1906 to May 12, 1924
- Predecessor: William Henry O'Connell
- Successor: John Gregory Murray

Orders
- Ordination: December 23, 1882 by Raffaele Monaco La Valletta
- Consecration: October 18, 1906 by John Joseph Williams

Personal details
- Born: January 22, 1858 Salem, Massachusetts, US
- Died: May 12, 1924 (aged 66) Portland, Maine, US
- Education: College of the Holy Cross; Grand Seminary of Montreal; Seminary of Saint-Sulpice
- Motto: In justitia et pace (In justice and peace)

Louis Sebastian Walsh (January 22, 1858 – May 12, 1924) was an American prelate of the Roman Catholic Church. He served as bishop of the Diocese of Portland in Maine from 1906 until his death in 1924.

== Biography ==
=== Early life ===
Louis Walsh was born on January 22, 1858, in Salem, Massachusetts, to Patrick and Honora (née Foley) Walsh. He attended the College of the Holy Cross in Worcester, Massachusetts, for one year before entering the Grand Seminary of Montreal in Montreal, Quebec. After attending the Seminary of Saint-Sulpice in Paris, France, Walsh furthered his studies in canon law and theology in Rome.

=== Priesthood ===
Walsh was ordained to the priesthood for the Archdiocese of Boston by Cardinal Raffaele Monaco La Valletta in Rome on December 23, 1882.

Following his return to Massachusetts, Walsh served as assistant pastor at St. Joseph's Parish in Boston's West End. In 1884, he became a professor of church history, canon law, and liturgy at St. John's Seminary in Boston. He was named the first supervisor of Catholic schools for the archdiocese in 1887. He was also one of the founders of the New England Catholic Historical Society and the Catholic Educational Association.

=== Bishop of Portland ===
On August 3, 1906, Walsh was appointed the fourth bishop of Portland by Pope Pius X. He received his episcopal consecration on October 18, 1906, from Archbishop John Williams, with Bishops Matthew Harkins and Thomas Beaven serving as co-consecrators, at the Cathedral of the Immaculate Conception in Portland, Maine. During his tenure as bishop, Walsh established several new parishes and schools, and renovated the cathedral. His tenure was also marked by a wave of immigrants from Poland, Italy, Slovakia, and Lithuania. He met vocal opposition from groups of French Canadian parishioners over the ownership of parish property, leading Walsh to place six of their leaders under interdict. He supported the National Catholic Welfare Conference and founded the Maine Catholic Historical Magazine.

Walsh's last years saw the rise of the Ku Klux Klan as a political force in Maine, and particularly in Portland. The Diocese's successful and expanding parochial school system became a Klan rallying point. Walsh personally led the fight against the Barwise Bill, a Klan-supported measure in the Maine Legislature that would have prevented the Catholic Church from receiving state funds for any purpose. The measure, and two similar bills by State Senator Owen Brewster and Senator Benedict Maher, were defeated, the last in a statewide referendum. Walsh's successor as bishop of Portland kept a much lower profile on Klan-related issues, however, allowing anti-Klan politicians to defend the church and Maine's Catholic population.

=== Death ===
After returning from a canonical visit to Rome and France in February 1924, Walsh was left exhausted. Louis Walsh died in Portland on May 12, 1924, at age 66.

Catholic Church titles
Preceded by William Henry O'Connell	Bishop of Portland; 1906–1924	Succeeded by John Gregory Murray
