= Richard Joseph Malone =

Catholic bishop

His Excellency, The Most Reverend Richard Joseph Malone
- Bishop emeritus of Buffalo
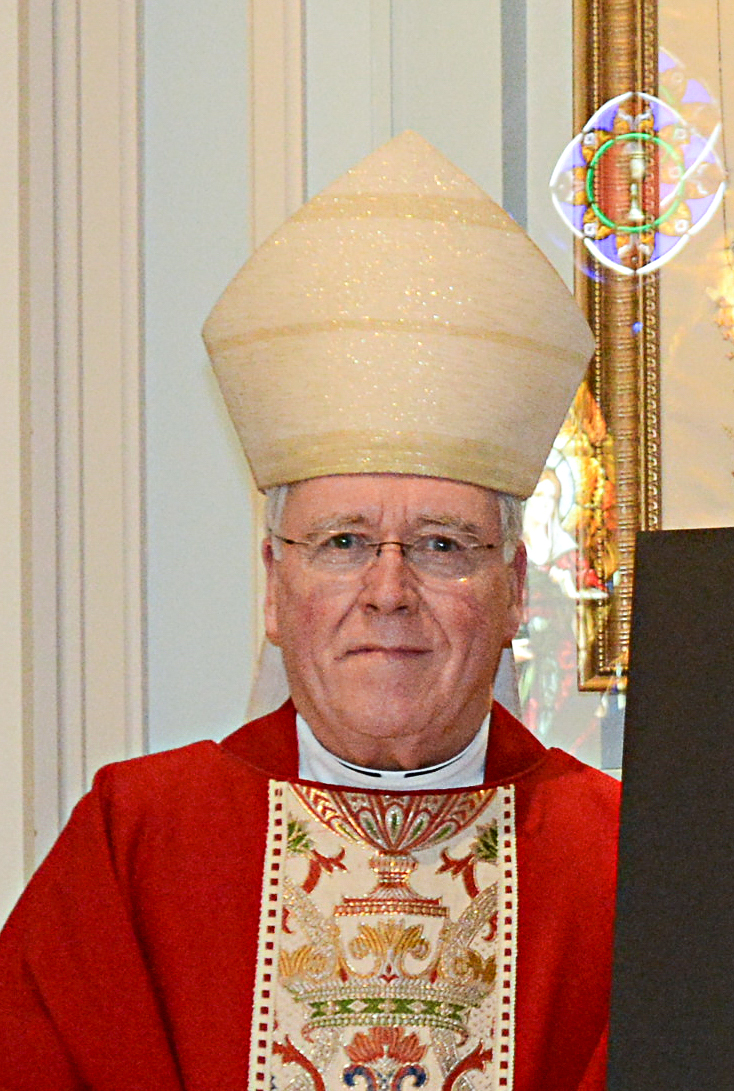
- Diocese: Buffalo
- Appointed: May 29, 2012
- Installed: August 10, 2012
- Retired: December 4, 2019
- Predecessor: Edward U. Kmiec
- Successor: Michael William Fisher
- Previous posts: Bishop of Portland, Maine (2004–2012); Auxiliary Bishop of Boston and Titular Bishop of Aptuca (2000–2004)

Orders
- Ordination: May 20, 1972 by Humberto Medeiros
- Consecration: March 1, 2000 by Bernard Francis Law, William Murphy, and John Patrick Boles

Personal details
- Born: March 19, 1946 (age 80) Salem, Massachusetts, US
- Denomination: Roman Catholic Church
- Motto: Live the truth in love

Styles of Richard Joseph Malone
- Reference style: His Excellency; The Most Reverend
- Spoken style: Your Excellency
- Religious style: Bishop

Richard Joseph Malone (born March 19, 1946) is an American prelate of the Roman Catholic Church who served as bishop of the Diocese of Buffalo in New York, from 2012 to 2019. He previously served as bishop of the Diocese of Portland in Maine from 2004 to 2012 and as an auxiliary bishop of the Archdiocese of Boston in Massachusetts from 2000 to 2004.

Malone resigned as bishop of Buffalo in 2019 following a Vatican investigation into his handling of sexual abuse cases in the diocese.

== Biography ==
=== Early life ===
Richard Malone was born on March 19, 1946, in Salem, Massachusetts. He was raised in Hamilton and Beverly, Massachusetts and has one sister. He graduated from St. John's Prep in 1964, and then attended Cardinal O'Connell Seminary and St. John's Seminary, both in Boston, Massachusetts, where he obtained his Bachelor of Philosophy, Master of Divinity, and Master of Theology degrees.

=== Priesthood ===
Malone was ordained to the priesthood at the Cathedral of the Holy Cross in Boston for the Archdiocese of Boston by Archbishop Humberto Medeiros on May 20, 1972. After his ordination, Malone served as associate pastor of St. Patrick Parish in Stoneham, Massachusetts, until 1974.

Malone taught at St. Clement High School in Medford, Massachusetts, (1974–1976) and at Xaverian Brothers High School in Westwood, Massachusetts (1976–1979), where he also served as a chaplain. In 1979, Malone joined the faculty of St. John Seminary, teaching religious and theological studies and serving as registrar and dean until 1990. In addition to his duties at the seminary, Malone also worked as a part-time chaplain at Wellesley College and Regis College, and as a teacher at Emmanuel College. Malone obtained his Doctor of Theology degree from Boston University in 1981, and his Licentiate of Sacred Theology from the Weston Jesuit School of Theology in Weston in 1990.

Malone was assigned to the Harvard-Radcliffe Catholic Student Center in 1990 as well as chaplain of St. Paul Parish in Cambridge, Massachusetts. Within the archdiocese, he was appointed director of the Office of Religious Education in 1993 and secretary for education in 1995. He is a Fourth Degree member of the Knights of Columbus, and a knight commander with Star of the Order of the Holy Sepulchre.

=== Auxiliary Bishop of Boston ===
On January 27, 2000, Malone was appointed as an auxiliary bishop of Boston and titular bishop of Aptuca by Pope John Paul II. He received his episcopal consecration at the Cathedral of the Holy Cross on March 1, 2001, from Cardinal Bernard Law, with Bishops William Murphy and John Boles as co-consecrators.

=== Bishop of Portland ===
John Paul II appointed Malone as the eleventh bishop of Portland on February 10, 2004, he was installed on March 31, 2004. In September 2011, Malone was named as chairman of the Committee on Evangelization and Catechesis of the United States Conference of Catholic Bishops (USCCB). He also produced and hosted programs for CatholicTV.

=== Bishop of Buffalo ===
On May 29, 2012, Pope Benedict XVI appointed Malone as bishop of Buffalo. He was installed at St. Joseph Cathedral in Buffalo on August 10, 2012. After his installation, Malone was appointed as apostolic administrator of Portland, continuing to run that diocese also until Bishop Robert P. Deeley was installed there on February 14, 2014

In January 2014, Malone was appointed chairman of the USCCB Committee on Laity, Marriage, Family Life, and Youth. On February 4, 2015, he issued a letter condemning the film Fifty Shades of Grey on the eve of its release in theaters. In his statement, Malone spoke of "...the beauty of the Church's teaching on the gift of sexual intimacy in marriage, the great dignity of women, and the moral reprehensibility of all domestic violence and sexual exploitation."

On September 12, 2018, leaked church records showed that there were 106 clergy in the Diocese of Buffalo who had been credibly accused of sexually abusing children, far more than a list of 42 which had been released by the diocese in March 2018.

On September 20, 2019, leaked audio recordings of Malone revealed that he diverted 40 percent of donations sent to Catholic charities in the diocese to a foundation known as "The Bishop's Fund for the Faith." The foundation was included in the diocese's budget as a separate corporate entity, which would protect the money from lawsuits and bankruptcy. On September 24, 2019, following the start of a criminal investigation against Reverend Jeffrey Novak, Malone published an Adult Sexual Misconduct Policy and Procedures and a new Code of Pastoral Conduct for Clergy. On October 3, 2019, the Congregation for Bishops in Rome assigned Bishop Nicholas DiMarzio to investigate Malone's handling of the Diocese of Buffalo.

=== Resignation and legacy ===
Pope Francis accepted Malone's resignation as bishop of Buffalo on December 4, 2019. The TV program 60 Minutes Overtime reported that Malone's resignation was linked to leaked sex abuse documents which were reported by 60 Minutes journalist Bill Whitaker in 2018. On December 10, 2019, Malone said he submitted his resignation early so the diocese could "move forward" and added: "It's just the right thing to do, and I'll still be living in the Buffalo area because I'm still a Bishop in good standing, so you'll see me around."

On November 23, 2020, New York Attorney General Letitia James filed a lawsuit against Malone, the Diocese of Buffalo and Auxiliary Bishop Emeritus Edward M. Grosz. The lawsuit claimed that the defendants misused diocese funds to cover up alleged sex abuse of over two dozen priests. At the same time, the attorney general released a 218-page report detailing a two-year investigation of all the defendants.

=== Sexual abuse cases ===
==== Smith case ====
In August 2018, WKBW-TV reported that Malone had returned at least priest accused of sexual abuse of minors to active ministry. A teacher at Mary of the Lake school in Hamburg, New York, Reverend Art Smith had allegedly gained a reputation for inappropriate behavior with its students; some students called him the "creeper". The final straw was in 2011 when Smith sent the message "I love you" to a boy on Facebook. After a parent complaint and comments from other staff members, principal Kristine Hider complained about Smith to the diocese, calling him a "predator". Malone's predecessor, Bishop Edward Kmiec, removed Smith from active ministry and sent him away for treatment.

Malone returned Smith to ministry in November 2012. Malone allowed Smith to serve at a church nursing home, but asked him informally not to wear clerical attire, offer sacraments, or say mass publicly. In 2013, the nursing home terminated Smith, due to allegations of inappropriately touching two young male employees. In 2015, Malone restored Smith's ability to offer sacraments publicly and wrote concerning him, "I am unaware of anything in his background which would render him unsuitable to work with minor children." He wrote a similar letter the following year. Smith was sent to live in a parish rectory. In 2017, the diocese suspended Smith, pending investigation of a new substantiated allegation of sexual abuse of minors.

A few clergy on the list who were still active in ministry have been suspended. On September 28, Malone named Steven L. Halter, a former agent in the FBI's Buffalo Division, as director of the diocese's new Office of Personal Responsibility, which handles sex abuse complaints.

==== Yetter case ====
In 2017, CNN reported on Malone's handling of sexual misconduct accusations against Reverend Robert Yetter, pastor of Saint Mary's Parish. One alleged victim said that Yetter began grooming him in second grade. The diocese sent Yetter to counseling and then dispatched him on an overseas mission trip. After returning to Buffalo, Yetter wrote to the diocese, cautioning it against removing him from St. Mary's. He argued that doing so would have a negative impact on diocesan finances, as the St. Mary's was one of the largest contributing parishes in the diocese. In January 2018, Malone responded to Yetter, thanking him for his "faithful and effective ministry", and permitted him to continue with priestly activities. After another allegation of sexual misconduct, Yetter was forced to resign in August 2018 and placed on administrative leave.

Malone stated that he had handled accusations of misconduct against adults differently than those against minors. "Let me be clear. My handling of recent claims from some of our parishioners concerning sexual misconduct with adults unquestionably has fallen short of the standard to which you hold us, and to which we hold ourselves," he said. "We can do better. We will do better." Communications director Kath Sprangler stated that the reason Yetter was not on the list of 42 allegedly abusive priests was because that list pertained exclusively to those accused of perpetrating abuse against minors. Sprangler also said that while there was "stringent and effective protocol" for handling allegations of abuse against minors, there was not yet "a parallel protocol for the allegation of misconduct with adults. We are in the process of generating one at this time."

==== Salemi case ====
On May 6, 2020, months after his resignation as bishop of Buffalo, it was revealed that Malone "quietly put" accused priest Reverend Paul Salemi "on administrative leave in 2012," but then allowed the diocese to keep Salemi "on the diocesan payroll" after Salemi moved to the South. After a night of drinking, Salemi had attempted to seduce a 21-year-old male parishioner. Salemi was never laicized, and he did not stop receiving payment from the Diocese of Buffalo until payment to 23 accused diocese clergy, including Salemi, ended the previous week.

== See also ==
- Catholic Church hierarchy
- Catholic Church in the United States
- Historical list of the Catholic bishops of the United States
- List of Catholic bishops of the United States
- Lists of patriarchs, archbishops, and bishops

Catholic Church titles
Preceded by Edward U. Kmiec	Bishop of Buffalo; 2012–2019	Succeeded by Michael William Fisher
Preceded by Joseph John Gerry, OSB	Bishop of Portland; 2004–2012	Succeeded by Robert Deeley
