= David William Bacon =

American Catholic bishop

The Right Reverend David William Bacon
- Bishop of Portland
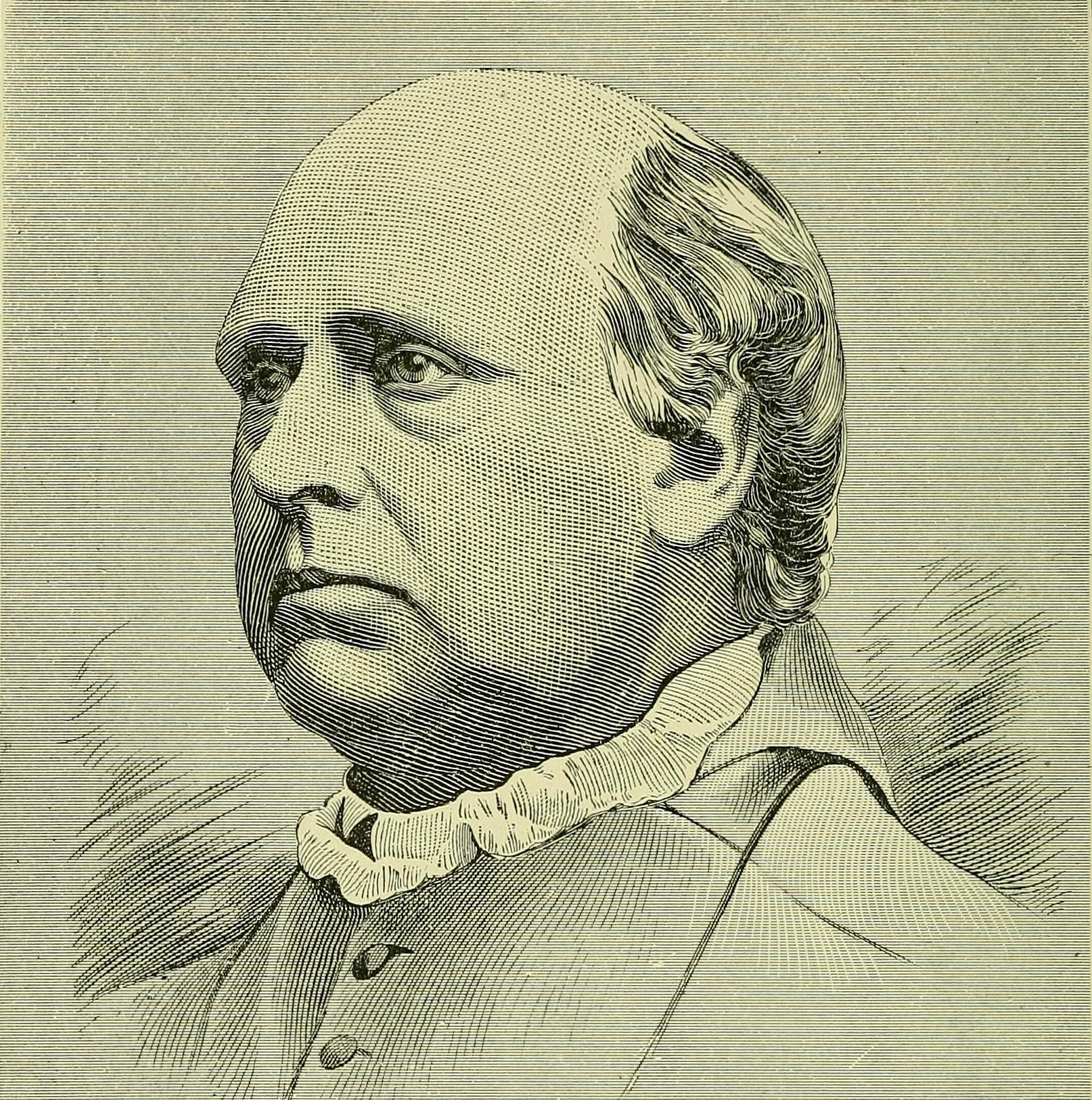
- Church: Catholic Church
- Diocese: Portland
- Appointed: January 23, 1855
- Term ended: November 5, 1874
- Predecessor: Office established
- Successor: James Augustine Healy

Orders
- Ordination: December 13, 1838 by Samuel Eccleston
- Consecration: April 22, 1855 by John Hughes

Personal details
- Born: September 15, 1813 Brooklyn, New York, U.S.
- Died: November 5, 1874 (aged 61) New York, New York, U.S.
- Buried: Cathedral of the Immaculate Conception
- Education: Collège de Montréal; Mount St. Mary's College
- Motto: Robur ac spes (Latin for 'Strength and hope')

David William Bacon (September 15, 1813 – November 5, 1874) was an American Catholic prelate who served as the first Bishop of Portland from 1855 until his death in 1874.

== Early life and education ==
David William Bacon was born on September 15, 1813, in Brooklyn, New York. He was the eldest child of William and Elizabeth (née Redmond) Bacon. His parents were Irish immigrants who were married by Father Benedict Joseph Fenwick at St. Peter's Church in 1812. His father, a sea captain, was lost at sea when David was a young child and while his mother was pregnant with a daughter, Jane.

Bacon completed his classical studies at the Collège de Montréal, and then studied theology at Mount St. Mary's College in Emmitsburg, Maryland. In addition to being a student, he served on the faculty of Mount St. Mary's (1834–1837).

== Priesthood ==
While in Maryland, Bacon was ordained a priest on December 13, 1838, by Archbishop Samuel Eccleston. Upon his return to New York, he was appointed an assistant to Father Walter Quarter, brother of future bishop William Quarter and pastor of St. John's Church in Utica. He became pastor of St. Mary's Church in Ogdensburg in October 1839, assistant to Father Andrew Byrne at St. James Church in Manhattan in December 1840, and pastor of St. Peter's Church in Belleville, New Jersey, in January 1841.

Bacon briefly served as pastor of St. Joseph's Church in Greenwich Village, succeeding Father John McCloskey upon his appointment to St. John's College in June 1841 until McCloskey returned to his post the following year due to poor health. Bacon was then assigned to his native Brooklyn, where he organized the new parish of Assumption Church. As pastor (1842–1855), he completed of the construction of the church building and established a parochial school. Given the growth of the parish, he helped create the new parish of St. Mary Star of the Sea in Brooklyn, while remaining at Assumption.

== Bishop of Portland ==
In July 1853, Pope Pius IX erected the Diocese of Portland, covering the entire states of Maine and New Hampshire. For its first bishop, the pope initially appointed Father Henry B. Coskery, vicar general of the Archdiocese of Baltimore. However, Coskery refused to accept and Rome waited over a year to name another.

Bacon was appointed Bishop of Portland on January 23, 1855. He received his episcopal consecration on the following April 22 at St. Patrick's Cathedral from Archbishop John Hughes, with Bishops John Bernard Fitzpatrick and John Loughlin serving as co-consecrators.

Following his arrival in Portland, Bacon was installed at St. Dominic's Church, the city's only Catholic church, on May 31, 1855. At the beginning of his tenure as bishop, the diocese contained 24 churches and 10 priests, including Fathers John Bapst and Anthony F. Ciampi, to serve a Catholic population of at least 40,000. By the end of his tenure in 1874, the diocese would contain 63 churches, 52 priests, 23 parochial schools (more than the dioceses of Boston, Burlington, or Providence), and approximately 80,000 Catholics.

=== Anti-Catholic attacks ===
Very early into Bacon's tenure as bishop, he was confronted with anti-Catholic attacks in Maine. In 1854, the year before his arrival, Father John Bapst had been tarred and feathered in Ellsworth after speaking out against forcing Catholic students to read the Protestant Bible at public schools. That same year, a Catholic church was burned in Bath. In November 1855, Bacon attempted to lay the cornerstone for a new church but a mob overtook the site, breaking crucifixes and assaulting Catholic congregants.

=== Cathedral of the Immaculate Conception ===
Bacon began efforts to create a cathedral in 1856 with the purchase of property on Cumberland Avenue. At first, a chapel with seating for 600 was constructed by December 1856. Work on the main building was delayed for several years, especially by the Civil War. The work resumed in earnest in 1866, with Bacon laying the cornerstone on May 31 of that year. However, the Great Fire of Portland on the following July 4 destroyed around 1,800 buildings, including the unfinished cathedral, the chapel, the bishop's residence, a parochial school, and a convent.

A new chapel and school were erected within six months of the fire. Shortly before his departure to Rome for the First Vatican Council, Bacon dedicated the Cathedral of the Immaculate Conception on September 8, 1869. Later that day, however, a storm knocked down the new cathedral's steeple; it was repaired by late October.

=== First Vatican Council ===
Bacon attended the First Vatican Council (1869–1870), where the main topic of discussion was the definition of papal infallibility. At the opening session of the Council in January 1870, Bacon joined eighteen other American bishops who signed an unsuccessful petition requesting Pope Pius IX to withdraw the proposal. While some had theological reservations, others thought the proposal was inopportune, especially given anti-Catholic opinion in the United States. However, at both the preliminary vote on July 13 and the final vote on July 18, Bacon voted in favor of the proposal.

== Death ==
In the summer of 1874, Bacon sailed with Archbishop John McCloskey for a visit to Rome. However, Bacon fell ill and was taken to a hospital in Brest, France. He remained there until late October, when he returned to New York with McCloskey. As soon as their ship reached New York on November 4, Bacon was taken to St. Vincent's Hospital, where he died the following day at the age of 61.

Bacon's body was then taken by train to Portland, and a Requiem Mass was celebrated on November 10 at the Cathedral of the Immaculate Conception by Bishop John Joseph Williams, with Archbishop McCloskey delivering the eulogy. He was initially buried in the crypt of the cathedral, next to his mother, sister, and aunts. 151 years later, in November 2025, Bacon's remains were transferred to a new sarcophagus located within the main cathedral.

== Sources ==
- Lucey, William Leo (1957). The Catholic Church in Maine. Francestown, NH: Marshall Jones Company.
