= Robert Deeley =

American Catholic prelate (born 1946)

His Excellency The Most Reverend Robert Peter Deeley
- Bishop Emeritus of Portland
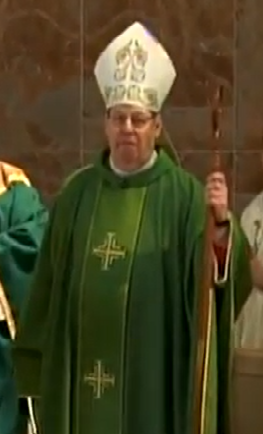
- Bishop Deeley in 2017
- Church: Catholic Church; Latin Church
- Diocese: Portland
- Appointed: December 18, 2013
- Installed: February 14, 2014
- Retired: May 7, 2024
- Predecessor: Richard Joseph Malone
- Successor: James T. Ruggieri
- Previous posts: Auxiliary Bishop of Boston and Titular Bishop of Kearney (2012‍–‍2014)

Personal details
- Born: June 18, 1946 (age 80) Cambridge, Massachusetts, US
- Education: Catholic University of America; North American College; Pontifical Gregorian University
- Motto: Vetitatem facere in caritate (Latin for 'Living the truth in love', Ephesians 4:15)

Ordination history
History
Priestly ordination
- Ordained by: Humberto Sousa Medeiros
Episcopal consecration
- Principal consecrator: Sean Patrick Card. O’Malley
- Co-consecrators: John Clayton Nienstedt; Robert Charles Evans

Styles of Robert Peter Deeley
- Reference style: His Excellency; The Most Reverend
- Spoken style: Your Excellency
- Religious style: Bishop

Robert Peter Deeley (born June 18, 1946) is an American prelate of the Catholic Church who served as bishop of the Latin Church diocese of Portland in Maine from 2013 to 2024. He is currently bishop emeritus of Portland. He previously served as an auxiliary bishop of the Archdiocese of Boston in Massachusetts from 2012 to 2013.

== Biography ==
=== Early life and education ===
Robert Deeley was born on June 18, 1946, in Cambridge, Massachusetts to Michael and Mary Deeley, both from County Galway, Ireland. Growing up in Belmont, Massachusetts, he later attended Matignon High School in Cambridge. After deciding to enter the priesthood, Deeley enrolled in 1964 at the Cardinal O’Connell Minor Seminary in Boston.

After two years at the minor seminary, Deeley received the Basselin Foundation Scholarship, allowing him to attend the Catholic University of America in Washington, D.C. After graduating in 1968 with a Bachelor of Philosophy degree, he entered the Pontifical North American College in Rome, earning a Bachelor of Sacred Theology degree at the Pontifical Gregorian University in 1972.

=== Ordination and ministry ===
On July 14, 1973, Deeley was ordained a priest for the Archdiocese of Boston by Cardinal Humberto Medeiros at Sacred Heart Church in Watertown, Massachusetts.

Following his ordination in 1973, the archdiocese assigned Deeley to serve as an associate pastor at St. Bartholomew Parish in Needham, Massachusetts. He left St. Bartholomew in 1978 to become the secretary to the Metropolitan Tribunal of the archdiocese.

In 1981, the archdiocese sent Deeley back to the Gregorian University, where he earned a Licentiate of Canon Law in 1983 and a Doctor of Canon Law summa cum laude in 1986. His dissertation was entitled: "The Mandate for Those who Teach Theology in Institutes of Higher Studies: An Interpretation of the Meaning of Canon 812 of the Code of Canon Law." Deeley then returned to Boston.

In 1989, Cardinal Bernard Law named Deeley as judicial vicar. Deeley was named a prelate of honor in 1995 by Pope John Paul II. giving him the title of "monsignor." In 1999, the archdiocese named Deeley as pastor of St. Ann Parish in Quincy, Massachusetts. Deeley served as president of the Canon Law Society of America in 2000.

Cardinal Joseph Ratzinger called Deeley to Rome in 2004 to work in the Congregation for the Doctrine of the Faith. Deeley returned to Boston in 2010 when Cardinal Seán Patrick O'Malley named him vicar general and moderator of the curia.

=== Auxiliary Bishop of Boston ===
On November 9, 2012, Pope Benedict XVI named Deeley as an auxiliary bishop of Boston and titular bishop of Kearney. He was consecrated on January 4, 2013, at the Cathedral of the Holy Cross in Boston by Cardinal Seán O'Malley. Archbishop John Nienstedt and Bishop Robert Evans served as co-consecrators. Deeley chose "Veritatem facere in caritate" ("Living the truth in love") from St. Paul's Letter to the Ephesians as his episcopal motto.

=== Bishop of Portland ===
On December 18, 2013, Pope Francis appointed Deeley as bishop of Portland. He was installed at the Cathedral of the Immaculate Conception in Portland, Maine, on February 14, 2014.

On September 16, 2016, a Maine man sued Deeley, claiming that he had been sexually abused as a child by two diocese priests. The unnamed plaintiff was serving a 60-year sentence for the murder of his grandfather in 1986.

In 2016, Deeley served the US Conference of Catholic Bishops (USCCB) as chair of the Committee on Canonical Affairs and Church Governance. The USCCB in 2017 named him as chair of the board for the National Catholic Risk Retention Group. Deeley in October 2023 expressed his sympathies for the victims of the mass shooting in Lewiston, Maine.

=== Retirement ===
Deeley retired as bishop of Portland on May 7, 2024 and was succeeded by James T. Ruggieri.

== See also ==
- Catholic Church in the United States
- Hierarchy of the Catholic Church
- Historical list of the Catholic bishops of the United States
- List of Catholic bishops in the United States
- Lists of popes, patriarchs, primates, archbishops, and bishops

== Episcopal succession ==
Catholic Church titles
Preceded by Richard Joseph Malone	Bishop of Portland; 2014–2024	Succeeded by James T. Ruggieri
Preceded by –	Auxiliary Bishop of Boston; 2012–2013	Succeeded by –
Preceded by Felipe de Jesús Estévez	Titular Bishop of Kearney; 2012–2013	Succeeded by Brian Alan Nunes
