= James T. Ruggieri =

American Catholic prelate (born 1968)

His Excellency, The Most Reverend James T. Ruggieri
- Bishop of Portland in Maine
- Church: Catholic Church; Latin Church
- Diocese: Portland in Maine
- Appointed: February 13, 2024
- Installed: May 7, 2024
- Predecessor: Robert Deeley

Orders
- Ordination: June 24, 1995 by Louis Edward Gelineau
- Consecration: May 7, 2024 by Seán Patrick O'Malley, Robert Deeley, and Richard Henning

Personal details
- Born: January 12, 1968 (age 58) Providence, Rhode Island, U.S.
- Education: Bachelor of Philosophy, Providence College; Master of Divinity, St. Mary's Seminary and University
- Motto: Auspice Maria (Latin for 'Under the protection of Mary')
- Styles
- Reference style: His Excellency; The Most Reverend
- Spoken style: Your Excellency
- Religious style: Bishop

James Thomas Ruggieri (born January 12, 1968) is an American Catholic prelate who serves as Bishop of Portland in Maine.

== Biography ==
=== Early life ===
James Ruggieri was born on January 12, 1968, in Providence, Rhode Island, to John and Irene (Paolino) Ruggieri. He attended public schools in Barrington, Rhode Island. Deciding to become a priest, Ruggieri attended Providence College in Providence, where he received a Bachelor of Arts in religious studies. He then entered St. Mary's Seminary in Baltimore, Maryland, where he obtained a Master of Divinity.

=== Priesthood ===
On June 24, 1995, Ruggieri was ordained to the priesthood for the Diocese of Providence by Bishop Louis Gelineau at the Cathedral of Ss. Peter and Paul in Providence Ruggieri served as pastor for 20 years at St. Patrick Parish in Providence. For four years after, he served as pastor at St. Michael the Archangel Parish in the same city.

=== Episcopal career ===
Pope Francis appointed Ruggieri as bishop of Portland on February 13, 2024. On May 7, 2024, Ruggieri was consecrated as a bishop by Cardinal Seán Patrick O'Malley, with Bishops Robert Deeley and Richard Henning serving as co-consecrators, at the Cathedral of the Immaculate Conception in Portland.

== See also ==
- Catholic Church hierarchy
- Catholic Church in the United States
- Historical list of the Catholic bishops of the United States
- List of Catholic bishops of the United States
- Lists of patriarchs, archbishops, and bishops

== Episcopal succession ==
Catholic Church titles
Preceded by Robert Deeley	Bishop of Portland; 2024–present	Succeeded by Incumbent
