= Daniel Joseph Feeney =

Catholic bishop (1894–1969)

His Excellency, The Most Reverend Daniel Joseph Feeney
- Bishop of Portland; Titular Bishop of Sita
- Church: Roman Catholic Church
- See: Diocese of Portland
- In office: September 9, 1955 to September 15, 1969
- Predecessor: Joseph Edward McCarthy
- Successor: Peter Leo Gerety
- Previous posts: Auxiliary Bishop of Portland (1946 to 1952); Coadjutor Bishop of Portland (1952 to 1955)

Orders
- Ordination: May 21, 1921 by Georges Gauthier
- Consecration: September 12, 1946 by Amleto Cicognani

Personal details
- Born: September 12, 1894 Portland, Maine. US
- Died: September 15, 1969 (aged 75) Portland, Maine
- Education: College of the Holy Cross; Grand Seminary of Montreal
- Motto: Predica verbum (Preach the word)

Styles of Daniel Feeney
- Reference style: The Most Reverend
- Spoken style: Your Excellency
- Religious style: Monsignor
- Posthumous style: none

Daniel Joseph Feeney (September 12, 1894 – September 15, 1969) was an American prelate of the Catholic Church. He served as bishop of Portland in Maine from 1955 until his death in 1969. He previously served as auxiliary bishop of Portland from 1946 to 1952 and as coadjutor bishop of Portland from 1952 to 1955.

== Biography ==
=== Early life ===
Daniel Feeney was born on September 12, 1894, in Portland, Maine, to Daniel Joseph and Mary Ann (née Quinn) Feeney. His father worked as superintendent of the Portland Gas Company. Raised in St. Dominic's Parish in Portland, he attended public schools and graduated from Portland High School in 1912. Feeney studied at the College of the Holy Cross in Worcester, Massachusetts, from 1913 and 1915. He then attended the Grand Seminary of Montreal in Montreal, Quebec, for six years.

Feeney was ordained to the priesthood in Montreal by Archbishop Georges Gauthier for the Diocese of Portland on May 21, 1921. He then served as assistant pastor at St. Mary's Parish in Orono, Maine from 1921 to 1926, and as superintendent of diocesan schools from 1926 to 1929. He was pastor of the Nativity of the Blessed Virgin Mary Parish in Presque Isle, Maine, from 1929 to 1946.

=== Auxiliary Bishop and Coadjutor Bishop of Portland ===
On June 22, 1946, Feeney was appointed auxiliary bishop of Portland and titular bishop of Sita by Pope Pius XII. Feeney, who was Portland's first native bishop, received his episcopal consecration on September 12,1946, his fifty-second birthday, from Archbishop Amleto Cicognani, with Bishops Matthew Brady and Joseph McCarthy serving as co-consecrators, in the Cathedral of the Immaculate Conception in Portland. He performed many of McCarthy's administrative duties due to the latter's poor health, and became apostolic administrator in 1948. Pius XII appointed him as coadjutor bishop of the diocese on March 4, 1952.

=== Bishop of Portland ===
Feeney succeeded McCarthy as the seventh bishop of Portland upon his death on September 9, 1955. During his tenure, Feeney opened a number of rectories, convents, schools, social centers, parish halls, and the diocesan chancery. He also freed the Portland diocese of its considerable debt, which was his self-proclaimed greatest tangible accomplishment. From 1962 to 1965, Feeney attended the Second Vatican Council in Rome and was subsequently active in implementing the council's reforms, such as by modernizing the cathedral.

Daniel Feeney died on September 15, 1969, at age 75, having spent his last several months at Mercy Hospital in Portland. His funeral Mass was held at St. Dominic Parish, as the cathedral was closed for renovation.

Catholic Church titles
Preceded by Joseph Edward McCarthy	Bishop of Portland; 1955–1969	Succeeded by Peter Leo Gerety
