= Diocese of Portland =

Latin Catholic ecclesiastical jurisdiction in Maine, United States

Diocese of Portland Dioecesis Portlandensis

Catholic
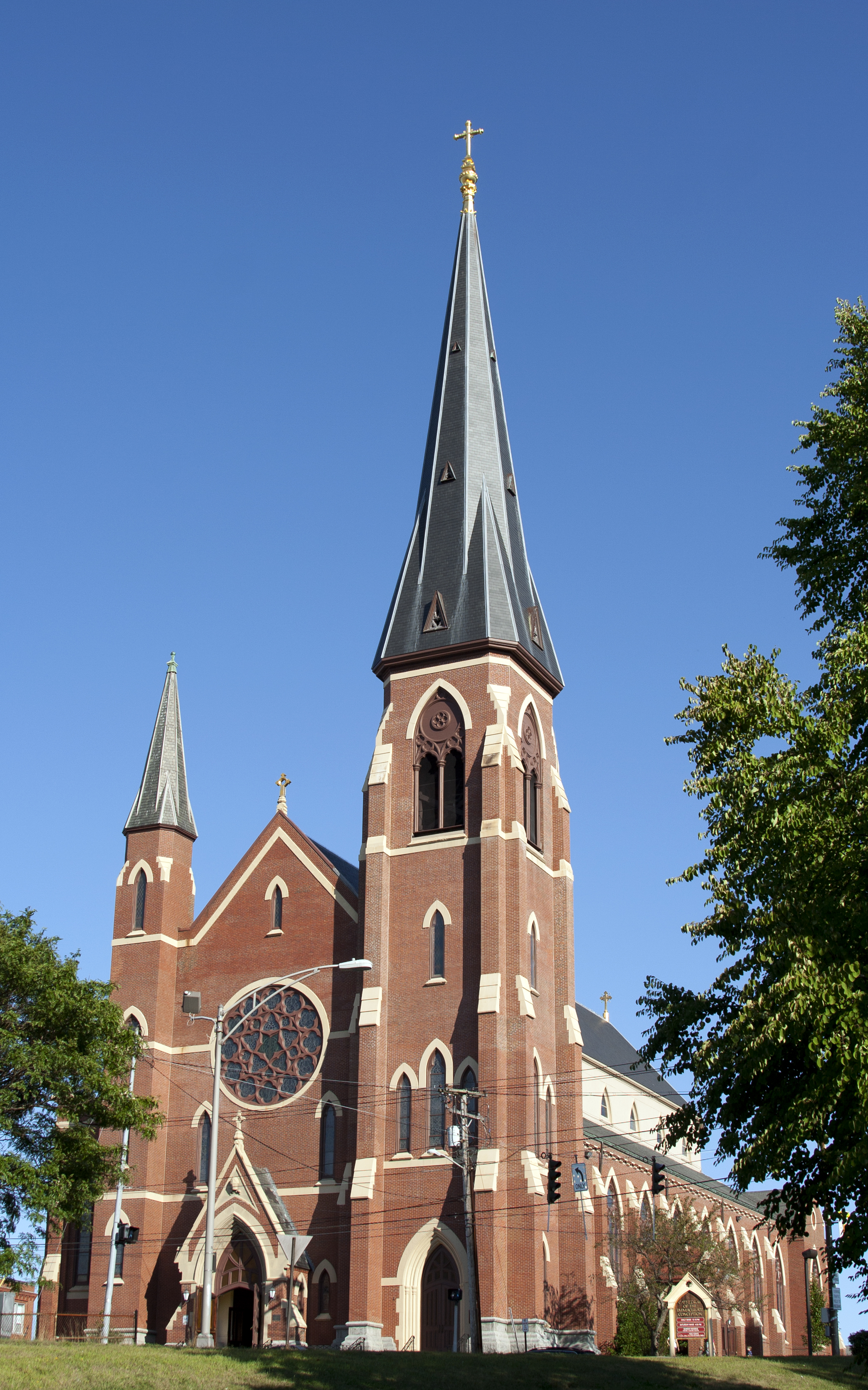
- Cathedral of the Immaculate Conception

- Coat of arms

Location
- Country: United States
- Territory: Maine
- Episcopal conference: United States Conference of Catholic Bishops
- Ecclesiastical region: Region I
- Ecclesiastical province: Province of Boston
- Metropolitan: Archdiocese of Boston
- Coordinates: 43°41′05″N 70°16′13″W

Statistics
- Area: 33,040 sq mi (85,600 km^{2})
- Population: Total; Catholics: (as of 2023); ▲1,362,357; ▲286,095 ( 21.0%)
- Parishes: ▼48 (2023)

Information
- Denomination: Catholic
- Sui iuris church: Latin Church
- Rite: Roman Rite
- Established: July 29, 1853 (173 years ago)
- Cathedral: Cathedral of the Immaculate Conception
- Secular priests: ▼101 (diocesan) (2023); ▲35 (religious); ▼46 (permanent deacons)

Current leadership
- Pope: Leo XIV
- Bishop: James T. Ruggieri
- Metropolitan Archbishop: Richard Henning

Map
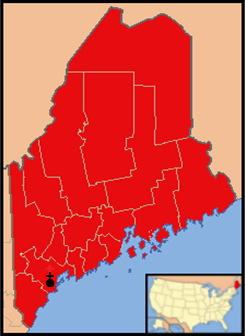

Website
- portlanddiocese.org

The Diocese of Portland (Latin: Dioecesis Portlandensis) is a diocese of the Catholic Church for the entire state of Maine in the United States. It is a suffragan diocese of the metropolitan Archdiocese of Boston. The mother church of the Diocese of Portland is the Cathedral of the Immaculate Conception in Portland. James T. Ruggieri is the bishop.

== History ==
=== 1600 to 1783 ===
The first Catholics in present-day Maine were French Jesuit priests who established missions among the Native American tribes. Saint Sauveur mission was founded on Mount Desert Island in 1613. Assumption Mission was established in present-day Augusta in 1646. The Catholic mission to the Penobscot Native Americans was established in 1688 by Louis-Pierre Thury on Indian Island.

During the 17th and early 18th centuries, the Maine area was contested territory among the British and French In 1724, militiamen from the British colonies raided the Abenaki village at Norridgewock, killing scores of inhabitants along with their Jesuit priest, Sébastien Rale.With the end of the French and Indian War in 1763, the British took complete control of Maine.

=== 1783 to 1853 ===
After the American Revolution ended in 1783, Pope Pius VI erected in 1784 the Prefecture Apostolic of the United States, encompassing the entire territory of the new nation. At this point, Maine had become part of the new State of Massachusetts. Pius VI created the Diocese of Baltimore, the first diocese in the United States, to replace the prefecture apostolic in 1789. Jean-Louis Lefebvre de Cheverus, the future first bishop of the Diocese of Boston, performed missionary work with the Penobscot and Passamaquoddy in Maine in 1798.

Pope Pius VII erected the Diocese of Boston in 1808, including all of New England in its jurisdiction. That same year, Cheverus dedicated St. Patrick Church in Newcastle. It is the oldest Catholic church still in use in New England.In later years, Cheverus made an agreement with Archbishop Joseph-Octave Plessis that allowed the Archdiocese of Quebec to send priests to the St. John Valley and other areas in Maine with large French-Canadian communities.

St. Denis Parish was established in North Whitefield in 1818. In 1820, Maine became its own state. The early 19th century saw an influx of Irish Catholic immigrants to Maine. In 1833, St. Dominic's became the first Catholic church in Portland. Bangor built its first Catholic Church, St. Michael's, in 1834.

=== 1853 to 1875 ===
On July 29, 1853, Pope Pius IX erected the Diocese of Portland. He took New Hampshire and Maine from the Diocese of Boston to create the new diocese, making it a suffragan of the Archdiocese of New York. The pope appointed David Bacon of the Archdiocese of New York as the first bishop of Portland. At the beginning of Bacon's tenure, the diocese held only six priests and eight churches.

An anti-Catholic riot broke out in Bangor in July 1854. Inflamed by a street preacher, a mob of 1,500 descended on the Old South Church, a former Congregational Church that had been purchased recently by an Irish Catholic group.The rioters broke into the church, smashed the pews, hoisted an American flag from the belfry, rang the bell, and then set the building on fire.During this period, another church was burned by rioters in Lewiston. In Ellsworth, the priest John Bapst was robbed, tarred and feathered.. When Bacon arrived in the diocese for the first time, he arrived at night dressed like a layman to avoid conflict.

The American Civil War in the early 1860s slowed the establishment of new churches and parishes in the diocese. With the end of the war, the cotton mills in New England began to reopen. Thousands of Catholic French-Canadians moved from Quebec to Maine and other New England States to work in these factories.

The Great Fire of Portland in 1866 damaged some diocesan property. In 1868, the Cathedral of the Immaculate Conception was dedicated.When Bacon died in 1874, the diocese contained 63 churches, 52 priests, and 23 parish schools, serving a Catholic population of approximately 80,000.

=== 1875 to 1900 ===
On February 12, 1875, Pope Pius IX elevated the Diocese of Boston to the Archdiocese of Boston. He moved the Diocese of Portland from the Archdiocese of New York to the new archdiocese. That same month, the pope appointed James Healy from Boston as the new bishop. Healy was the first African-American Catholic bishop in the United States, although he kept his racial identity a secret.

Early into his tenure as bishop, Healy became involved in a conflict with one of his priests, Jean Ponsardin of Biddeford, Maine. Healy suspected that Ponsardin had been stealing money that the diocese had given him to build a new church. After four years of construction, the building only had a basement and unfinished exterior walls. Healy refused to give Ponsardin any more money and suspended him from ministry in October 1877. Ponsardin then appealed his suspension to the Vatican, which created gossip among officials there. Healy finally agreed to pay Ponsardin's debts on the condition that he leave the diocese.

The Ponsardin matter caused such embarrassment for Healy that he submitted his resignation to Leo XIII in 1878, but the pope rejected it. In 1884, Pope Leo XIII erected the Diocese of Manchester and removed New Hampshire from the Diocese of Portland. This action reduced the diocese to its current territory, the State of Maine. Healy supervised the setup of the new diocese. The Sisters of Charity of St. Hyacinthe in 1888 opened St. Mary's Hospital in Lewiston, the first hospital in that community. Today it is St. Mary's Health System.By the time Healy died in 1900, the diocese had 92 priests, 86 churches, and 96,400 Catholics.

=== 1900 to 1925 ===
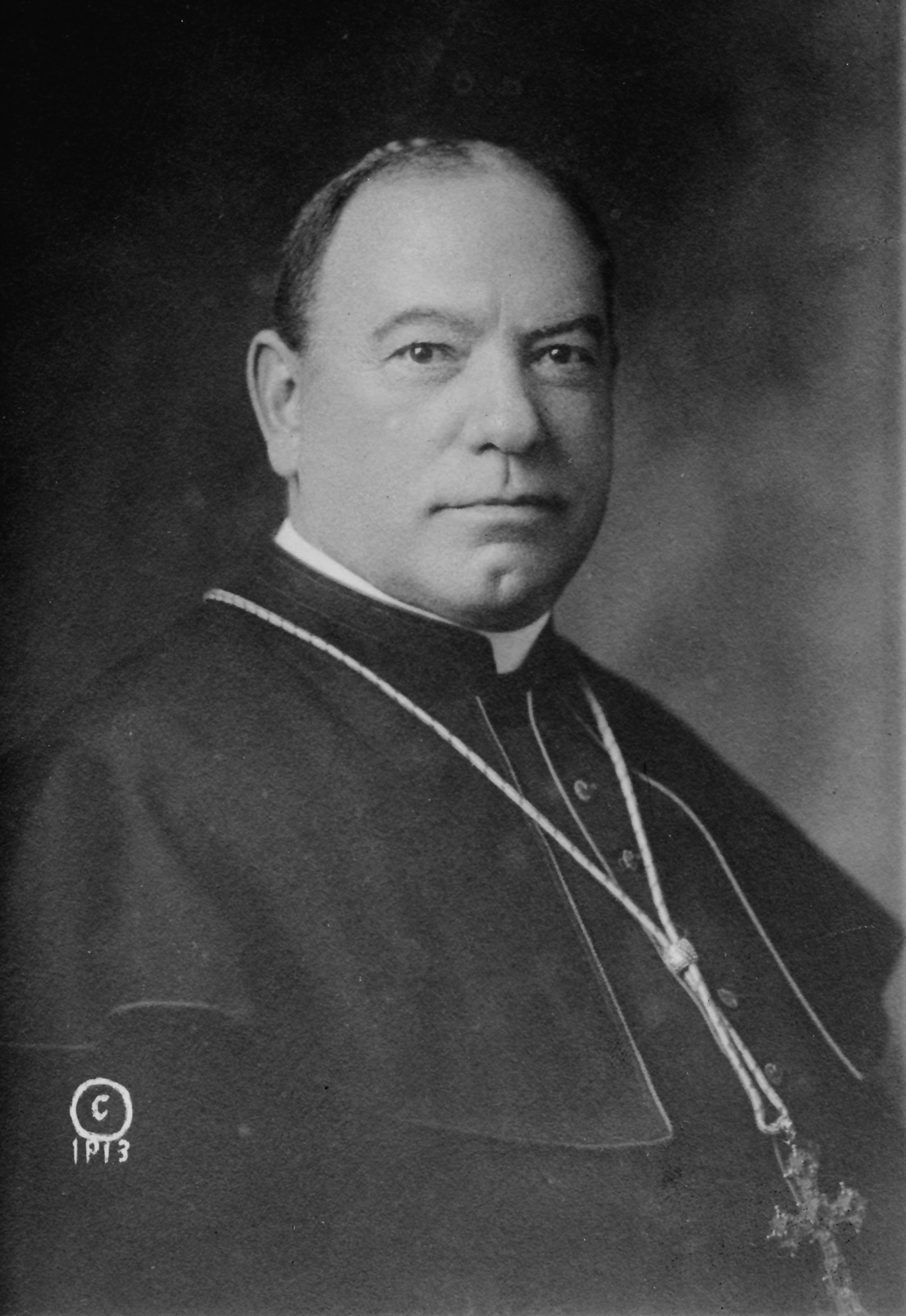
Cardinal O'Connell (1913)

Leo XIII appointed William O'Connell of Boston in 1901 as the new bishop of Portland. After five years as bishop there, he was appointed coadjutor archbishop of Boston. To replace O'Connell, Pope Pius X in 1906 appointed Louis Walsh from Boston. During his tenure as bishop, Walsh established several new parishes and schools, and renovated the Cathedral of the Immaculate Conceptionl. His tenure was also marked by a wave of immigrants from Poland, Italy, Slovakia, and Lithuania. He met vocal opposition from groups of French-Canadian parishioners over the ownership of parish property, leading Walsh to place six of their leaders under interdict.

The Sisters of Mercy in 1912 established Saint Joseph’s College in Portland to train women to become teachers. Today it is Saint Joseph's College of Maine. The Spanish Flu pandemic hit Portland in 1918, sickening thousands of people. In response, Walsh asked the Sisters of Mercy to open a hospital in the city. Queen’s Hospital opened in December 1918. Today it is Northern Light Mercy Hospital.

Walsh's last years as bishop of Portland saw the rise of the Ku Klux Klan as a political force in Maine, particularly in Portland. The diocese's expanding parochial school system became a Klan rallying point. Walsh personally led the fight against the Barwise Bill, a Klan-supported measure in the Maine Legislature that would have prevented the state government from providing the Catholic Church with funds for any purpose. The Barwise Bill and two similar bills by State Senators Owen Brewster and Benedict Maher were defeated in 1923, the last one in a statewide referendum. Walsh died in 1924.

=== 1925 to 1950 ===
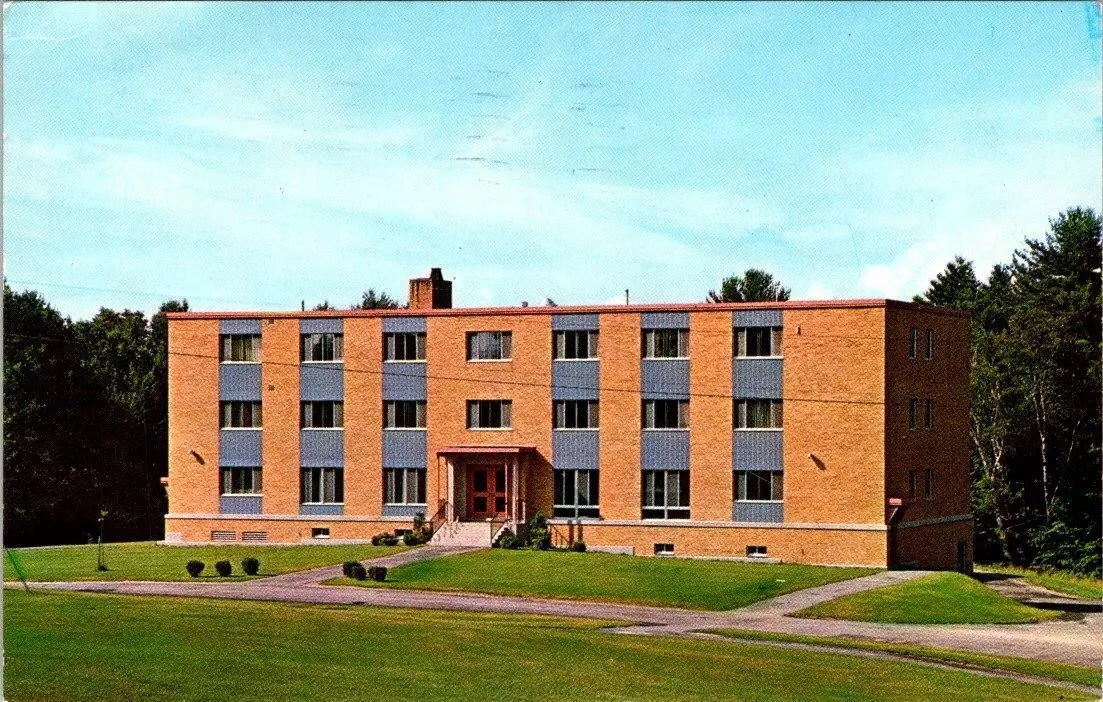
St. Joseph College of Maine, Standish (1970)

Auxiliary Bishop John Murray of the Diocese of Hartford was appointed by Pope Pius XI in 1925 as bishop of Portland. During his five-year tenure in Portland, Murray established 30 new parishes and a diocesan weekly newspaper, Church World, in 1930. During the Great Depression of the 1930s, Murray organized relief committees to raise money for the homeless and unemployed families. He was forced to mortgage church property to continue funding hospitals, orphanages, and other institutions. Consequently, the diocese accumulated millions of dollars in debt. Murray was appointed archbishop of the Archdiocese of St. Paul in 1932.

Murray's replacement as bishop was Joseph McCarthy of Hartford, named by Pius XI in 1932.McCarthy used his power as a corporation sole to alleviate the debt accumulated by Murray by offering the diocesan property holdings as security for a successful bond issue. By 1936, he had stabilized the diocesan financial situation.

In 1938, McCarthy purchased the former Portland home of railroad executive Morris McDonald as his official residence. He opened numerous elementary schools and high schools during his tenure.In 1939, the College Séraphique opened in Biddeford. It was a Catholic high school and junior college for the children of French-Canadian immigrants working in the area mills. Today it is the University of New England.

Pope Pius XII named Daniel Feeney of Portland as an auxiliary bishop of his diocese in 1946; McCarthy delegated most of his administrative tasks to Feeney due to his own declining health.The Felician Sisters in 1947 opened St. Joseph's Hospital in Bangor. Today it is part of St. Joseph Health Care.

=== 1950 to 2000 ===
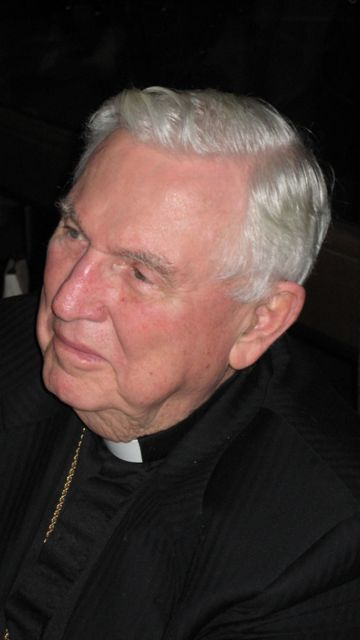
Archbishop Emeritus Gerety (2009)

In 1952, Pius XII appointed Feeney as coadjutor bishop of the diocese. When McCarthy died in 1955, Feeney automatically became the new bishop of Portland.

Feeney opened new rectories, convents, schools, social centers, parish halls, and the diocesan chancery. In what he described as his greatest accomplishment, Feeney eliminated the diocesan debt burden, which dated back to the 1930s. In 1967, Peter Gerety of Hartford was appointed by Pope Paul VI as coadjutor bishop of Portland to assist Feeney. When Feeney died in 1969, Gerety automatically succeeded him as bishop of Portland.

As bishop, Gerety implemented the liturgical reforms of the Second Vatican Council of the early 1960s by modernizing the Cathedral of the Immaculate Conception, through the removal of the high altar, cathedra, pulpit, and communion rail. He also helped provide housing for the elderly and expanded the diocesan Bureau of Human Relations. In 1970, Paul VI appointed Edward O'Leary of Portland as auxiliary bishop in that diocese. When Gerety left Portland in 1974 to become archbishop of the Archdiocese of Newark, Pope John Paul II appointed O'Leary as Gerety's replacement. Auxiliary Bishop Joseph Gerry from Manchester was named by John Paul II to succeed O'Leary in 1988.

In 2000, the Associated Press reported that the Diocese of Portland had negotiated with and supported a Maine lawmakers' bill that barred discrimination on the basis of sexual orientation; this bill aimed to overcome the results of the Maine election in February 1998 that repealed the gay marriage law that Maine Governor Angus King signed into law. The diocese did not have a position on the February 1998 vote, citing ambiguities in the law while acknowledging that discrimination was unjust.

=== 2000 to present ===
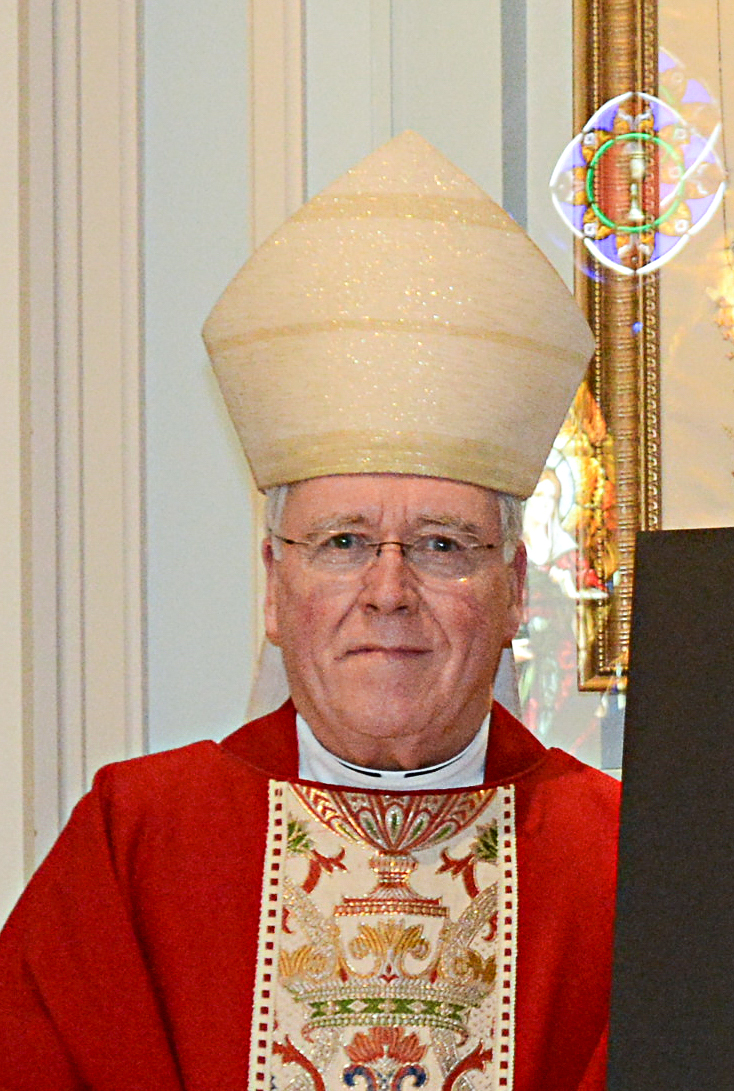
Bishop Malone (2017)

During his tenure in Portland, Gerry consolidated parishes in Old Town, Lisbon, and Waterville and opened St. Dominic Regional High School in Auburn in 2002.After Gerry's retirement as bishop of Portland in 2004, Pope Benedict XVI appointed Auxiliary Bishop Richard. J. Malone from Boston as the new bishop.

In 2012, Benedict XVI named Malone as bishop of the Diocese of Buffalo. That same year, it was reported that the diocese had contributed $550,000 to Stand For Marriage Maine, a successful campaign in 2009 to prevent legalization of same-sex marriage in Maine. In 2013, Pope Francis named Auxiliary Bishop Robert Deeley of Boston as Malone's successor in Portland.

On February 13, 2024, Pope Francis announced the appointment of James T. Ruggieri from the Diocese of Providence as Deeley's successor.

=== Sexual abuse ===
In 1998, nine male former students at the Jesuit-run Cheverus High School in Portland sued the Diocese of Portland, stating that they had been molested by James Talbot, a teacher, and Charles Malia, a coach. The plaintiffs accused both Cheverus and the diocese of hiding information about the abusers, and said that both parties knew about previous accusations against Talbot in Massachusetts. Prior to working in Portland, Talbot had been employed at the Boston College High School in Boston. After receiving accusations of sexual abuse against him in Boston, the Jesuit Order had transferred Talbot to Cheverus. By 2002, the Diocese of Portland had paid approximately $700,000 in settlement compensation to the Cheverus victims.

- Talbot admitted his guilt and was fired. In September 2018, Talbot pled guilty to the sex abuse charges in Maine and immediately began serving two concurrent three-year prison sentences.
- Malia retired in 1998, but did not admit his guilt until 2000. Due to the statute of limitations in Maine, Malia could not be prosecuted for any of his crimes.

In 2016, the Diocese of Portland settled six lawsuits for sexual abuse for an estimated $1.2 million. The male plaintiffs accused Bangor priest James Vallely of sexually abusing them between 1958 and 1977. In 2005, a former priest wrote to the diocese about Vallely, saying that Bishop Feeney had received sexual abuse allegations from five boys about Vallely during the 1950s. Feeney simply transferred Valley out of Bangor to another parish in a different town. In 1993, after several men reported abuse by Vallely to the diocese, he was suspended and sent to Florida for treatment.

By January 2019, the Society of Jesus' Northeast Province in the United States had acknowledged seven accused Jesuit clergy had taught at Cheverus. In August 2019, Bishop Deeley launched an abuse reporting system for the diocese.

In 2002, Gerry removed two priests, Michael Doucette and John Audibert, from ministry in parishes in northern Maine. The two men had admitted to sexually abusing different boys during the 1980s. Gerry said that the men would not be transferred to other parishes. Audibert was permanently from priesthood functions in 2006 and told to live a live of prayer and penance. Doucette was removed permanently from ministry in 2009.

Ronald Paquin, a priest with the Archdiocese of Boston, was convicted in Maine in November 2018 of eleven counts of sexual abuse. During the 1980s, he sexually abused a Massachusetts altar boy during trips they took to Maine. Paquin was sentenced to 16 years in prison in May 2019. In April 2020, the Maine Supreme Judicial Court upheld ten of Paquin's eleven convictions and vacated one of them. Paquin was laicized in 2004.

== Bishops ==
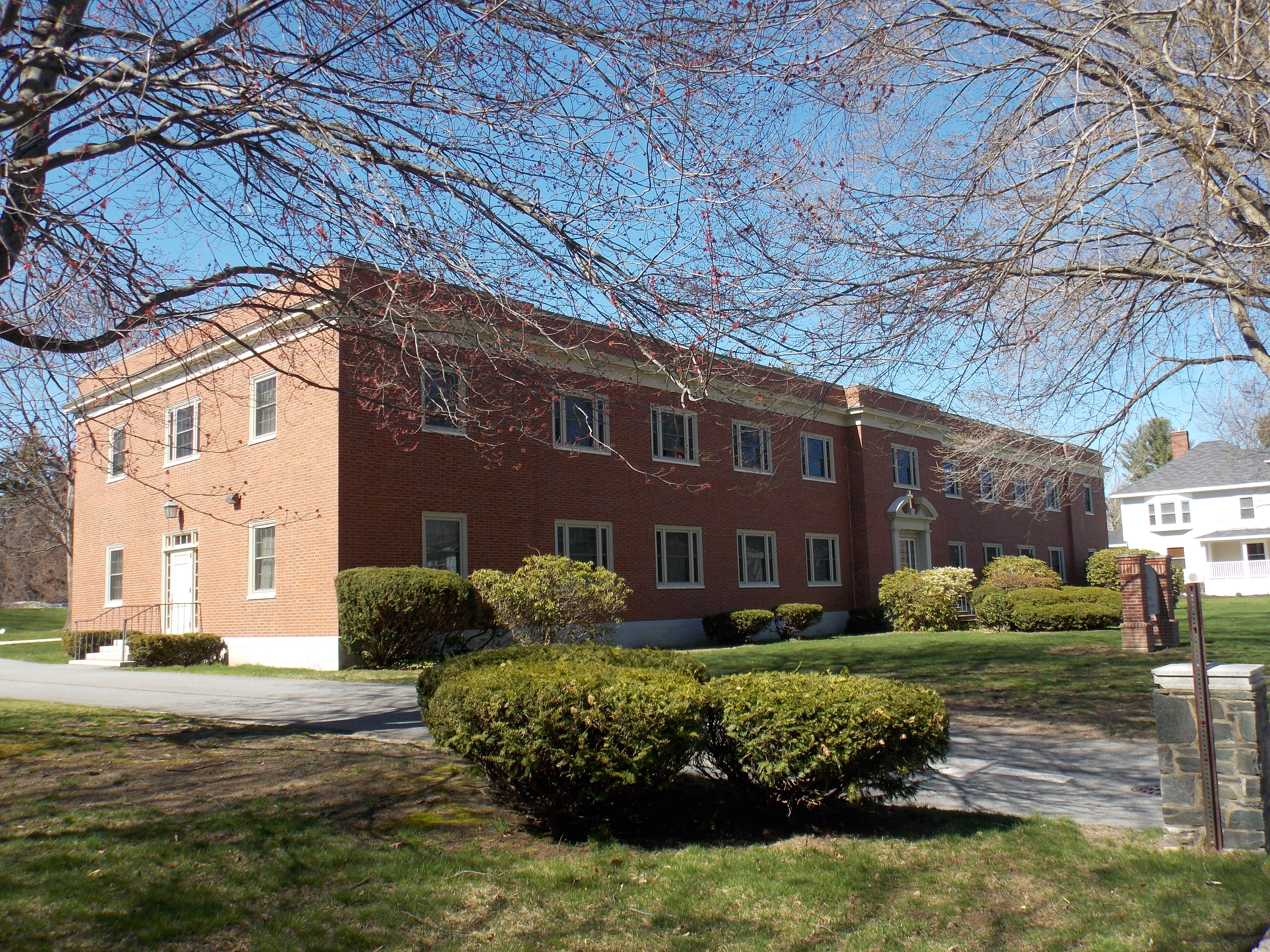
Pastoral Center (2016)

=== Bishops of Portland ===
1. David William Bacon (1853–1874)
2. James Augustine Healy (1875–1900)
3. William Henry O'Connell (1901–1906), appointed Coadjutor Archbishop and later Archbishop of Boston (elevated to Cardinal in 1911)
4. Louis Sebastian Walsh (1906–1924)
5. John Gregory Murray (1925–1932), appointed Archbishop of Saint Paul
6. Joseph Edward McCarthy (1932–1955)
7. Daniel Joseph Feeney (1955–1969; coadjutor bishop 1952–1955)
8. Peter Leo Gerety (1969–1974; coadjutor bishop 1966–1969), appointed Archbishop of Newark
9. Edward Cornelius O'Leary (1974–1989)
10. Joseph John Gerry (1989–2004)
11. Richard Joseph Malone (2004–2012), appointed Bishop of Buffalo
12. Robert Deeley (2014–2024)
13. James T. Ruggieri (2024-)

=== Auxiliary bishops ===
- Daniel Joseph Feeney (1946–1952), appointed coadjutor bishop of Portland
- Edward Cornelius O'Leary (1971–1974), appointed Bishop of Portland
- Amédée Wilfrid Proulx (1975–1993)
- Michael Richard Cote (1995–2003), appointed Bishop of Norwich

=== Other diocesan priest who became bishop ===
- Denis Mary Bradley, appointed Bishop of Manchester in 1884

== Parishes ==
The Diocese of Portland is divided into 30 clusters/parishes.

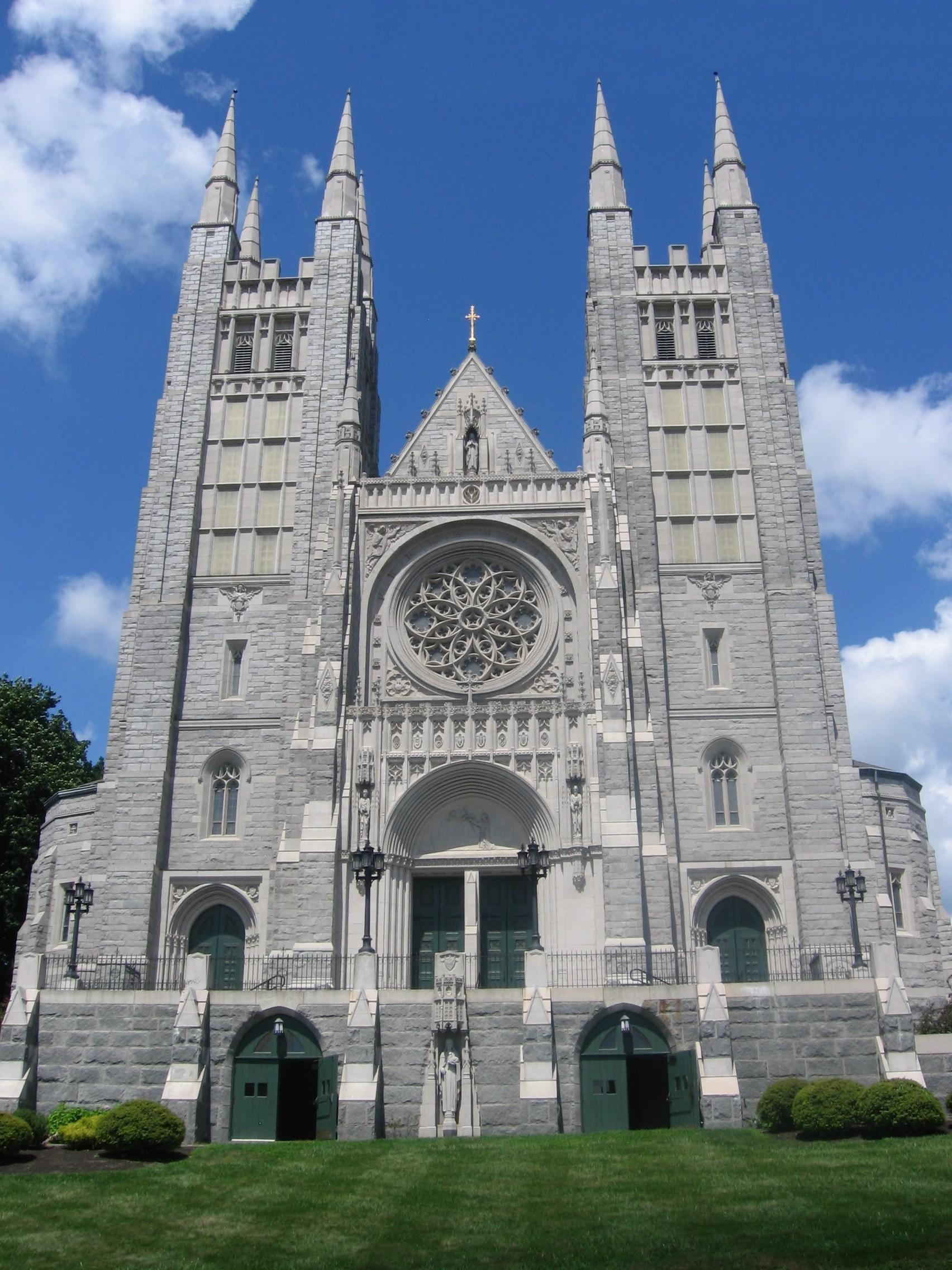
Basilica of Saints Peter and Paul, Lewiston

=== Basilica ===
The Basilica of Saints Peter and Paul is located in Lewiston. Erected in 1872, the parish grew due to a wave of late 19th century immigration by French Canadians. Construction of the current church began in 1906 and continued until 1936, by which time it was the second largest church in New England.

== Education ==
As of 2026, the Diocese of Portland has one middle school and nine elementary/middle schools. Cheverus High School in Portland is the only Catholic high school in the diocese
