= Amédée Wilfrid Proulx =

American Bishop

Most Reverend Amédée W. Proulx
- Auxiliary Bishop of Portland
- Church: Catholic Church
- See: Titular See of Clypia
- Appointed: September 16, 1975
- In office: November 12, 1975 – November 22, 1993 (died in office)

Orders
- Ordination: May 31, 1958
- Consecration: September 4, 1980 by Edward Cornelius O'Leary

Personal details
- Born: August 31, 1932 Sanford, Maine
- Died: November 22, 1993 (aged 61) Portland, Maine

Amédée Wilfrid Proulx (August 31, 1932 – November 22, 1993) was an American Bishop of the Catholic Church. He served as auxiliary bishop of the Diocese of Portland in the state of Maine from 1975 until his death in 1993.

== Biography ==
Born in Sanford, Maine of Franco-American descent, Amédée Proulx was ordained a priest for the Diocese of Portland on May 31, 1958. On September 16, 1975 Pope Paul VI appointed him as the Titular Bishop of Clypia and Auxiliary Bishop of Portland. He was ordained a bishop by Bishop Edward O'Leary on November 12, 1975. The principal co-consecrators were Bishops Timothy Harrington of Worcester and Odore Gendron of Manchester. He continued to serve as an auxiliary bishop until his death on November 22, 1993, at the age of 61.
