= Aptuca =

Village and Archaeolocical site in Tunisia

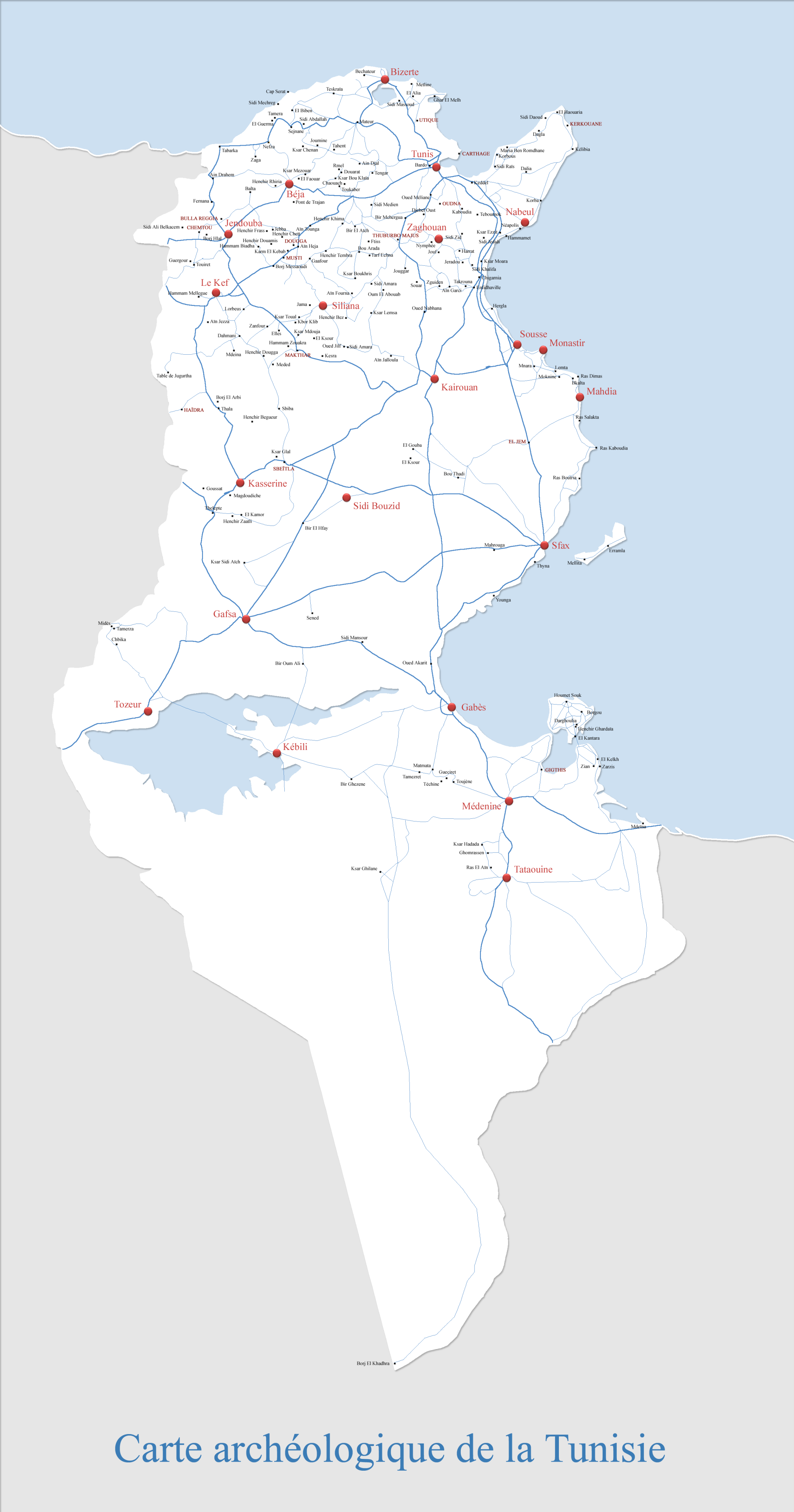
Archaeology map of Tunisia

Aptuca (Africa) or Henchir Oudeka, also known as Aptucca/Aptuca, Henchir-Oudeka/Henchir-Semmech. or Udeka is a village and archaeological site in Tunisia, North Africa located at 36.409344, 8.940301.

== History ==
During Roman and Byzantine times the town was an oppidum civilium on the Oued Tessa river. south east of Bulla Regis. Origines Ecclesiasticae calls it 'A city in Africa Proconsilaris'.

== Bishopric ==
The town was also the seat of an ancient bishopric. which remains a titular see of the Roman Catholic Church. Known bishops include:

- Victor 411 (Conference of Carthage)
- Ianuarius fl 411, Donatist bishop at the Council of Carthage (411).
- Ianuarius 425
- Alfonso Niehues (Brazil) 3 August 1965 – May 18, 1967
- Alois Stöger (Austria) July 3, 1967 – 12 December 1999
- Richard Joseph Malone (United States) 27 January 2000 – 10 February 2004
- Andrews Thazhath (India) 18 March 2004 – 22 January 2007
- Reinhard Pappenberger (Germany) 6 February 2007
