= William Henry O'Connell =

American cardinal (1859–1944)

His Eminence William Henry O'Connell
- Cardinal, Archbishop of Boston
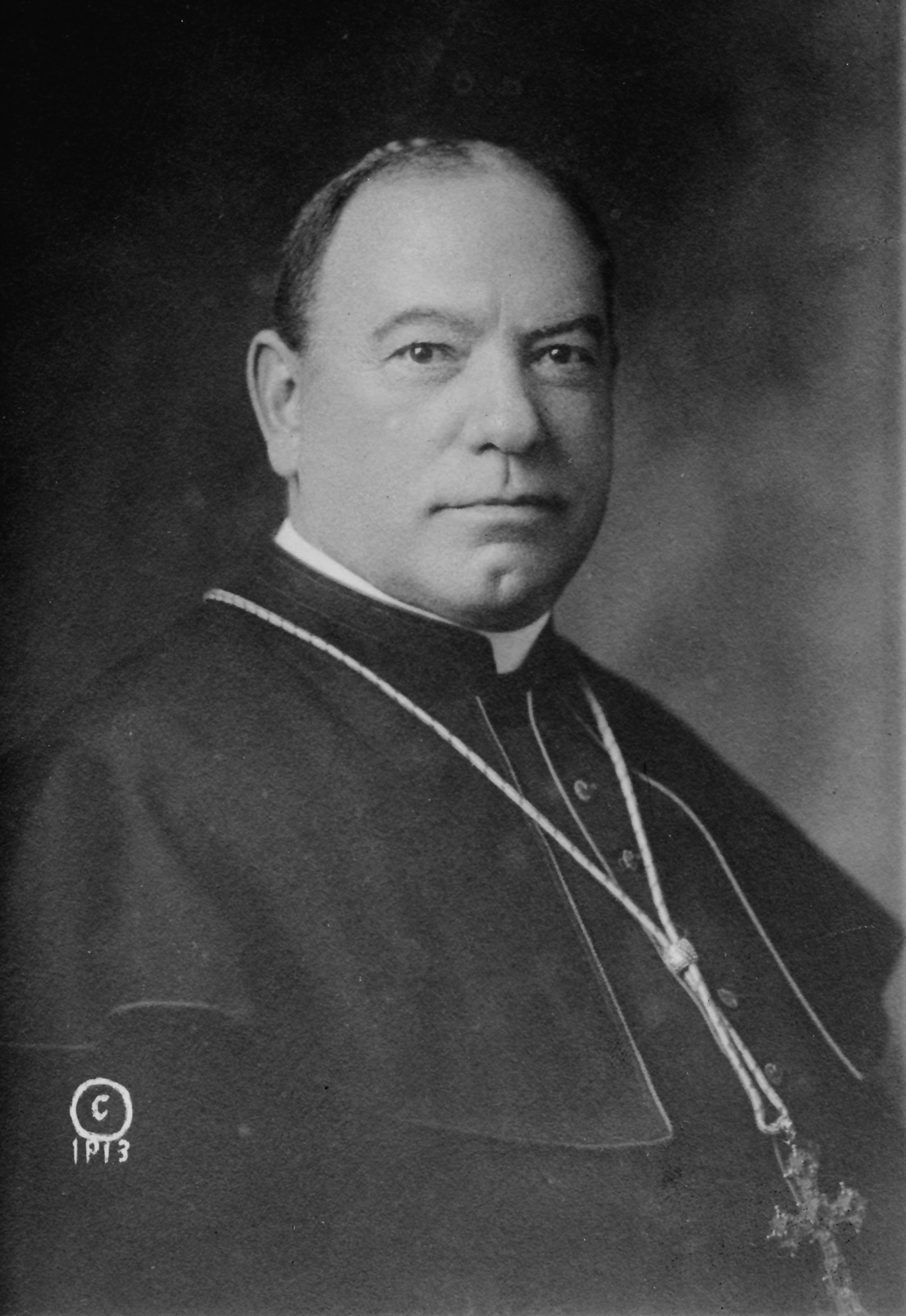
- O'Connell in 1913
- Archdiocese: Boston
- Appointed: February 7, 1906; (as Coadjutor)
- Installed: August 30, 1907
- Term ended: April 22, 1944
- Predecessor: John Joseph Williams
- Successor: Richard Cushing
- Other post: Cardinal-Priest of S. Clemente
- Previous posts: Coadjutor Archbishop of Boston (1906–1907); Bishop of Portland in Maine (1901-1906)

Orders
- Ordination: June 8, 1884 by Lucido Parocchi
- Consecration: May 19, 1901 by Francesco Satolli
- Created cardinal: November 27, 1911 by Pius X
- Rank: Cardinal-Priest

Personal details
- Born: December 8, 1859 Lowell, Massachusetts
- Died: April 22, 1944 (aged 84) Boston, Massachusetts
- Motto: Vigor in arduis (Latin for 'Strength in difficult times')
- Signature: William Henry O'Connell's signature

Ordination history
History
Episcopal consecration
- Consecrated by: Francesco Satolli
- Date: May 19, 1901
Episcopal succession
Bishops consecrated by William Henry O'Connell as principal consecrator
- Joseph Gaudentius Anderson: July 25, 1909
- John Joseph Nilan: April 28, 1910
- John Bertram Peterson: November 10, 1927
- Thomas Addis Emmet, S.J.: September 21, 1930
- Richard James Cushing: June 29, 1939
- Styles
- Reference style: His Eminence; The Most Reverend Eminence
- Spoken style: Your Eminence
- Religious style: Cardinal
- Informal style: Cardinal
- See: Boston

William Henry O'Connell (December 8, 1859 – April 22, 1944) was an American Catholic prelate who served as archbishop of Boston in Massachusetts from 1907 until his death in 1944, and was made a cardinal in 1911. He previously served as bishop of Portland in Maine from 1901 to 1906.

== Early life ==
O'Connell was born on December 8, 1859, in Lowell, Massachusetts, to John and Bridget (née Farrelly) O'Connell, who were Irish immigrants. The youngest of eleven children, he had six brothers and four sisters. His father worked at a textile mill and died when William was four years old. During his high school career, he excelled at music, particularly the piano and organ.

O'Connell entered St. Charles College in Ellicott City, Maryland, in 1876. At St. Charles, he was a pupil of the poet John Banister Tabb. He returned to Massachusetts two years later and entered Boston College. He graduated there in 1881 with gold medals in philosophy, physics, and chemistry. He then furthered his studies at the Pontifical North American College in Rome.

== Priesthood ==
O'Connell was ordained to the priesthood by Cardinal Lucido Parocchi on June 8, 1884. A pneumonia and bronchial congestion cut short his pursuit of a doctorate in divinity at the Pontifical Urban Athenaeum, forcing him to return to the United States in 1885.

The archdiocese first assigned O'Connell as curate of St. Joseph Parish in Medford, Massachusett. In 1886, he was transferred to St. Joseph Church in the West End of Boston. Returning to Rome, O'Connell was named rector of the North American College in 1895. The Vatican elevated him to the rank of domestic prelate in 1897.

== Episcopal career ==
=== Bishop of Portland in Maine ===
On February 8, 1901, O'Connell was appointed the third bishop of Portland by Pope Leo XIII. He chose for his episcopal motto "Vigor In Arduis" meaning "Strength in Adversity". He received his episcopal consecration on May 19, 1901, from Cardinal Francesco Satolli, with Archbishops Edmund Stonor and Rafael Merry del Val, in Rome at the Basilica of St. John Lateran. Upon his arrival in Maine, he was given an official reception by Governor John F. Hill. He was presented with a reliquary of the True Cross by Pope Pius X after the latter's election in 1903.

In 1905, in addition to his duties as a diocesan bishop, O'Connell was named papal envoy to Emperor Meiji of Japan; he was also decorated with the Grand Cordon of the Order of the Sacred Treasure and made an assistant at the pontifical throne in 1905. He was viewed as having actively campaigned to become archbishop of Boston, donating to numerous Vatican causes and publicly expressing his loyalty to the pope.

=== Archbishop of Boston and Cardinal ===
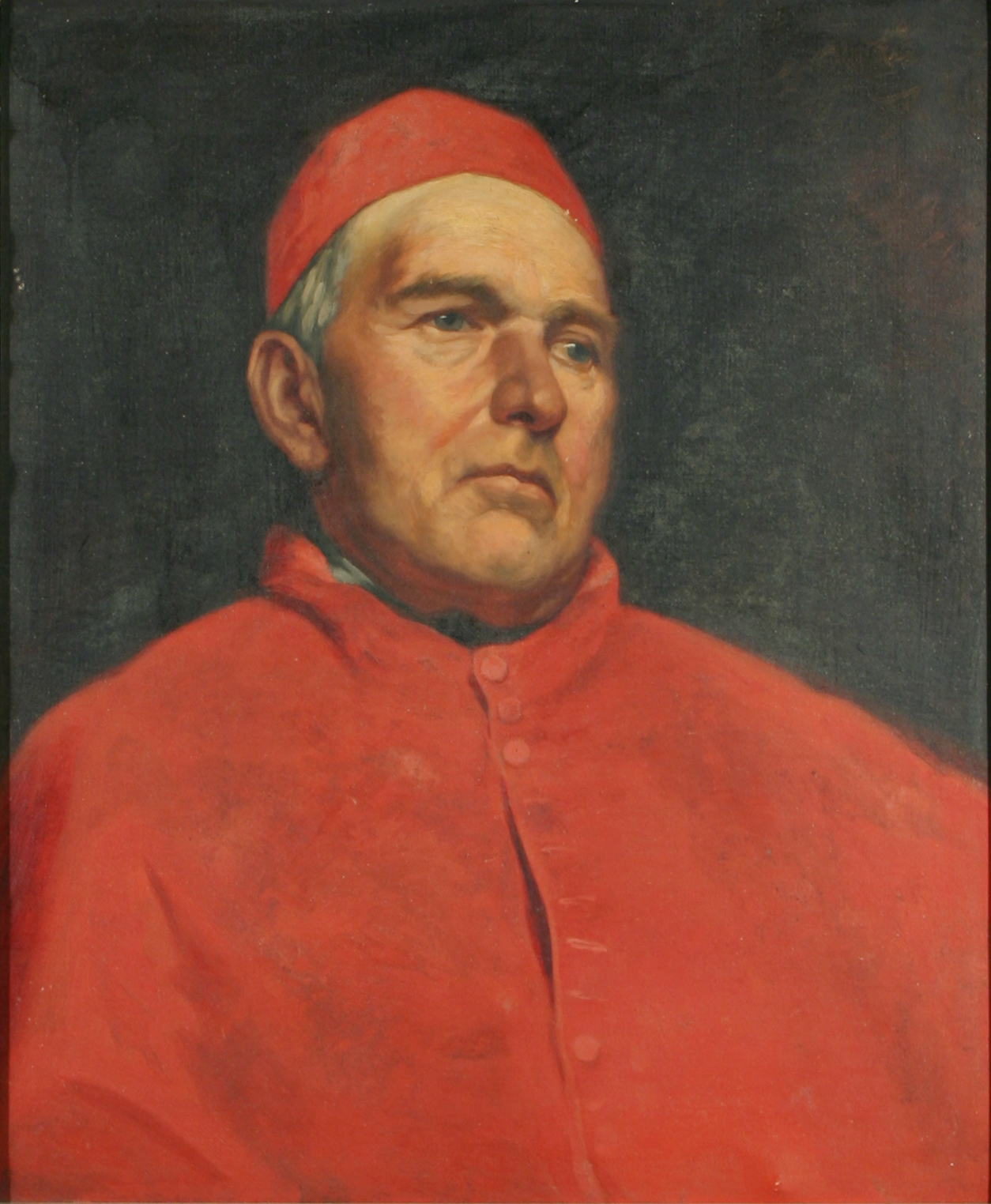
Painting by Albert Bernhard Uhle

O'Connell was named coadjutor archbishop of Boston with right of succession and titular archbishop of Constantina by Pope Pius X on February 21, 1906. As coadjutor, he served as the designated successor of Archbishop John Williams, then in declining health. He succeeded Williams as archbishop after his death on August 30, 1907.

On November 27, 1911, O'Connell became Boston's first archbishop to become cardinal, and was given the title of cardinal-priest of S. Clemente. He arrived late to two papal conclaves in a row, in 1914 and 1922, due to having to cross the Atlantic Ocean by ship. He complained about it to Pope Pius XI, who then lengthened the time period between the death of the pope and the start of the conclave. O'Connell was able to participate in the 1939 conclave.

O'Connell favored a highly centralized diocesan organization, encompassing schools, hospitals, and asylums in addition to parishes. He wielded immense political and social power in Massachusetts, earning him the nickname "Number One". For instance, he was responsible for defeating a bill to establish a state lottery in 1935, and for defeating a referendum liberalizing state birth control laws in 1942. The only politician who had anywhere near O'Connell's political clout was Massachusetts Governor (and future U.S. President) Calvin Coolidge, but even Coolidge picked his battles carefully, preferring to ignore O'Connell whenever possible. In the years leading up to the Second World War, O'Connell became a powerful force for the neutralists seeking to keep the United States out of war in the pre-Pearl Harbor era.

== Views ==
Having presided over the marriage of Joseph P. Kennedy Sr., and Rose Fitzgerald in 1914, he asked actress Gloria Swanson to end her affair with Kennedy.

He opposed the Child Labor Amendment and called Hollywood "the scandal of the nation".

He denounced the theories of Albert Einstein as "authentic atheism, even if camouflaged as cosmic pantheism".

He opposed euthanasia, calling suffering "the discipline of humanity".

He told his priests that they might refuse communion to women wearing lipstick.

In 1932, O'Connell condemned crooning, a singing style that was popular in the 1930s: "No true American man would practice this base art. Of course, they aren't men. ... If you will listen closely [to crooners' songs] you will discern the basest appeal to sex emotion in the young."

He had a cold relationship with his auxiliary bishop Francis Spellman, who later was the Archbishop of New York. O'Connell once said, "Francis epitomizes what happens to a bookkeeper when you teach him how to read."

He was also decidedly non-ecumenical. In 1908, he said, "The Puritan has passed. The Catholic remains."

== Influence ==
He was very influential in the growth of the Catholic Church. He was called by politicians "Number One" and enjoyed them frequently requesting his approval on issues. He was called a "battleship in full array".

O'Connell was the first American to be given honorary life membership in the Supreme Council of the Knights of Columbus.

== Other affairs ==
=== Scandal over nephew ===
O'Connell's nephew, James P. O'Connell, who served as chancellor of the archdiocese, had secretly married in 1913. Some of O'Connell's clerical enemies discovered this and reported it to Vatican authorities. The younger O'Connell was removed from office and from his priestly duties in 1920. His marriage lasted until his death in 1948. Little else is known of the relationship between uncle and nephew.

=== Falsified dates of authorship ===
In 1915, O'Connell published a collection of letters which, the publication claimed, he wrote between 1876 and 1901. In 1987, James M. O'Toole discovered that O'Connell had written the letters expressly for the 1915 publication. Other scholars who discussed the subject of the letters in 1975 had found the dates on the letters "suspect".

=== Frances Sweeney ===
In the early 1940s when Frances Sweeney, editor of the Boston City Reporter, criticized O'Connell for his passivity in the face of rampant antisemitism in Boston, O'Connell summoned Sweeney to his office and threatened her with excommunication.

== Death ==
O'Connell died from pneumonia in Brighton, aged 84. He was buried in the crypt of a small chapel (Immaculate Conception) he had built on the grounds of St. John's Seminary. In 2004, the Archdiocese sold the property to Boston College and in 2007 announced plans to relocate his remains to Saint Sebastian's School, which O'Connell founded in 1941. After a protracted lawsuit, O'Connell's relatives, who had opposed any disinterment, agreed that his remains would be removed to a courtyard of the Seminary. The reinterment took place on July 20, 2011.

== Legacy ==
His 36-year-long tenure was the longest in the history of the Archdiocese of Boston. He was the second-to-last surviving cardinal created by Pope Pius X behind Gennaro Granito Pignatelli di Belmonte and is the third-longest serving American cardinal behind James Gibbons and William Wakefield Baum. During O'Connell's tenure as Archbishop of Boston, the number of women in religious life increased from 1567 to 5459; the number of parishes increased from 194 to 322; the number of churches increased from 248 to 375; the number of diocesan priests increased from 488 to 947; the archdiocese was operating 3 Catholic hospitals. According to one historian, "It was under O'Connell's influence too, that the Catholic Church in the Archdiocese of Boston assumed a conceptual solidarity and impressive visibility that it had never seen before and would never see again."

One of O'Connell's grandnephews, Paul G. Kirk, served briefly as U.S. Senator in 2009.

== In popular culture ==
In Henry Morton Robinson's best-selling 1950 historical novel, The Cardinal, the Archbishop of Boston in the exact time frame as O'Connell's term in office is named "Lawrence Cardinal Glennon". Robinson's physical descriptions of Glennon, his massive building program, his arriving late for two papal conclaves and arriving in time for a third, his popular description as "Number One" and many other details of the Glennon character correspond with O'Connell's career and personality. The "Cardinal" of the title, however, is a young priest who serves as Glennon's secretary and himself becomes a cardinal in the course of the novel.

== Hymns ==
In addition to his published volumes of letters, sermons and addresses, O'Connell's legacy includes a collection of hymns under the title Holy Cross Hymnal published by McLaughlin and Reilly, Boston, in 1915., including:

- Hymn to the Holy Cross
- Hymn to the Holy Name
- Prayer for a Perfect Life

== Episcopal succession ==
Catholic Church titles
Preceded by John Joseph Williams	Archbishop of Boston; 1907–1944	Succeeded by Richard Cushing
Preceded by James Augustine Healy	Bishop of Portland, Maine; 1901–1906	Succeeded by Louis Sebastian Walsh
Academic offices
Preceded by Denis J. O'Connell	Rector of the Pontifical North American College; 1895–1901	Succeeded by Thomas F. Kennedy
