= John Patrick Boles =

His Excellency, The Most Reverend John Patrick Boles
- Auxiliary Bishop of Boston; Titular Bishop of Penafiel
- Church: Catholic Church; Latin Church
- Archdiocese: Boston

Orders
- Ordination: February 2, 1955 by Richard Cushing
- Consecration: May 21, 1992 by Bernard Law

Personal details
- Born: January 21, 1930 Boston, Massachusetts, US
- Died: October 9, 2014 (aged 84) Framingham, Massachusetts, US
- Education: St. John's Seminary; Boston College
- Motto: That all may be one

John Patrick Boles (January 21, 1930 – October 9, 2014) was an American prelate of the Roman Catholic Church. He served as an auxiliary bishop of the Archdiocese of Boston in Massachusetts from 1992 to 2006.

== Early life ==
John Boles was born on January 21, 1930, in Boston, Massachusetts. He graduated in 1947 from the St. Sebastian's Country Day School in Newton, Massachusetts. Deciding to become a priest, Boles entered St. John's Seminaryi7n Boston

== Priesthood ==
Boles was ordained to the priesthood in Boston at the Cathedral of the Holy Cross for the Archdiocese of Boston on February 2, 1955, by Cardinal Richard Cushing. After his ordination, the archdiocese assigned Boles as an assistant pastor at St. Edward the Confessor Parish in Medfield, Massachusetts. He was appointed to the faculty of St. Sebastian's in 1957. Boles received a Doctor of Education degree from Boston College in 1965. The next year, he was appointed headmaster of St. Sebastian.

In 1972, Boles was appointed as director of education for the archdiocese. He was named in 1974 as pastor of St. Paul Parish in Cambridge, Massachusetts, as well as senior chaplain for Harvard University and Radcliffe College.

== Auxiliary Bishop of Boston ==
On April 14, 1992, Boles was appointed an auxiliary bishop of Boston and titular bishop of Nova Sparsa by Pope John Paul II. Boles was consecrated on May 21, 1992, at the Cathedral of the Holy Cross by Cardinal Bernard Law.Boles served as regional bishop for the Central pastoral region of the archdiocese, based in Boston and Cambridge.

== Retirement and death ==
Boles retired as auxiliary bishop of Boston on October 12, 2006. He died on October 9, 2014, in Framingham, Massachusetts, aged 84.
