= Joseph Edward McCarthy =

Catholic bishop

His Excellency, The Most Reverend Joseph Edward McCarthy
- Bishop of Portland
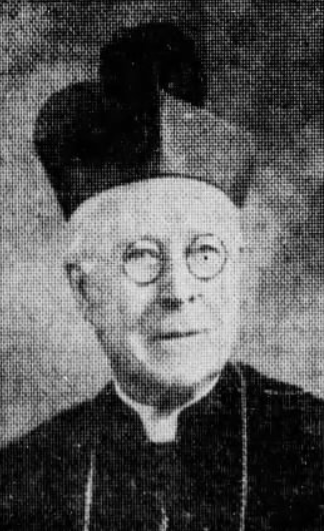
- Church: Roman Catholic Church
- See: Diocese of Portland
- In office: August 24, 1932 to September 8, 1955
- Predecessor: John Murray
- Successor: Daniel Joseph Feeney

Orders
- Ordination: July 4, 1903 by Félix-Jules-Xavier Jourdan de la Passardière
- Consecration: August 24, 1932 by Maurice F. McAuliffe

Personal details
- Born: November 14, 1876 Waterbury, Connecticut, U.S.
- Died: September 8, 1955 (aged 78) Portland, Maine, U.S.
- Education: College of the Holy Cross
- Motto: Mihi vivere Christus est (For me to live is Christ)

Joseph Edward McCarthy (November 14, 1876 – September 8, 1955) was an American prelate of the Roman Catholic Church. He served as the sixth bishop of the Diocese of Portland in Maine from 1932 until his death in 1955.

== Biography ==
=== Early life ===
Joseph McCarthy was born on November 14, 1876, in Waterbury, Connecticut. He attended the College of the Holy Cross in Worcester, Massachusetts. McCarthy was ordained to the priesthood in Paris by Bishop Félix-Jules-Xavier Jourdan de la Passardière for the Archdiocese of Hartford on July 4, 1903. McCarthy then taught Greek and French at St. Thomas Seminary in Bloomfield, Connecticut.

=== Bishop of Portland ===
On May 13, 1932, McCarthy was appointed bishop of Portland by Pope Pius XI. He received his episcopal consecration at the Cathedral of the Immaculate Conception in Portland on August 24, 1932, from Bishop Maurice F. McAuliffe, with Bishops John Nilan and John Peterson serving as co-consecrators. McCarthy's consecration was the first to be broadcast by radio in the United States.

During the Great Depression of the 1930s, McCarthy used his power as a corporation sole to remove the burden of debt by offering the property holdings as security for a successful bond issue. By 1936 he had stabilized the financial situation of the diocese.

In 1938, McCarthy purchased the former Portland home of railroad executive Morris McDonald as his official residence. He opened numerous elementary schools, high schools, and colleges during his tenure. He received Daniel Feeney as an auxiliary bishop in 1946, delegating much of the administration of the diocese to Feeney due to his own declining health.

== Personal life ==
McCarthy was an opponent of vivisection and was an honorary vice-president of the New England Anti-Vivisection Society.

He died in Portland, Maine, on September 8, 1955, at age 78. He is buried in Waterbury.

Catholic Church titles
Preceded by John Murray	Bishop of Portland; 1932–1955	Succeeded by Daniel Joseph Feeney
