= Cathedral of the Immaculate Conception (Portland, Maine) =

Historic church in Maine, United States

- U.S. National Register of Historic Places
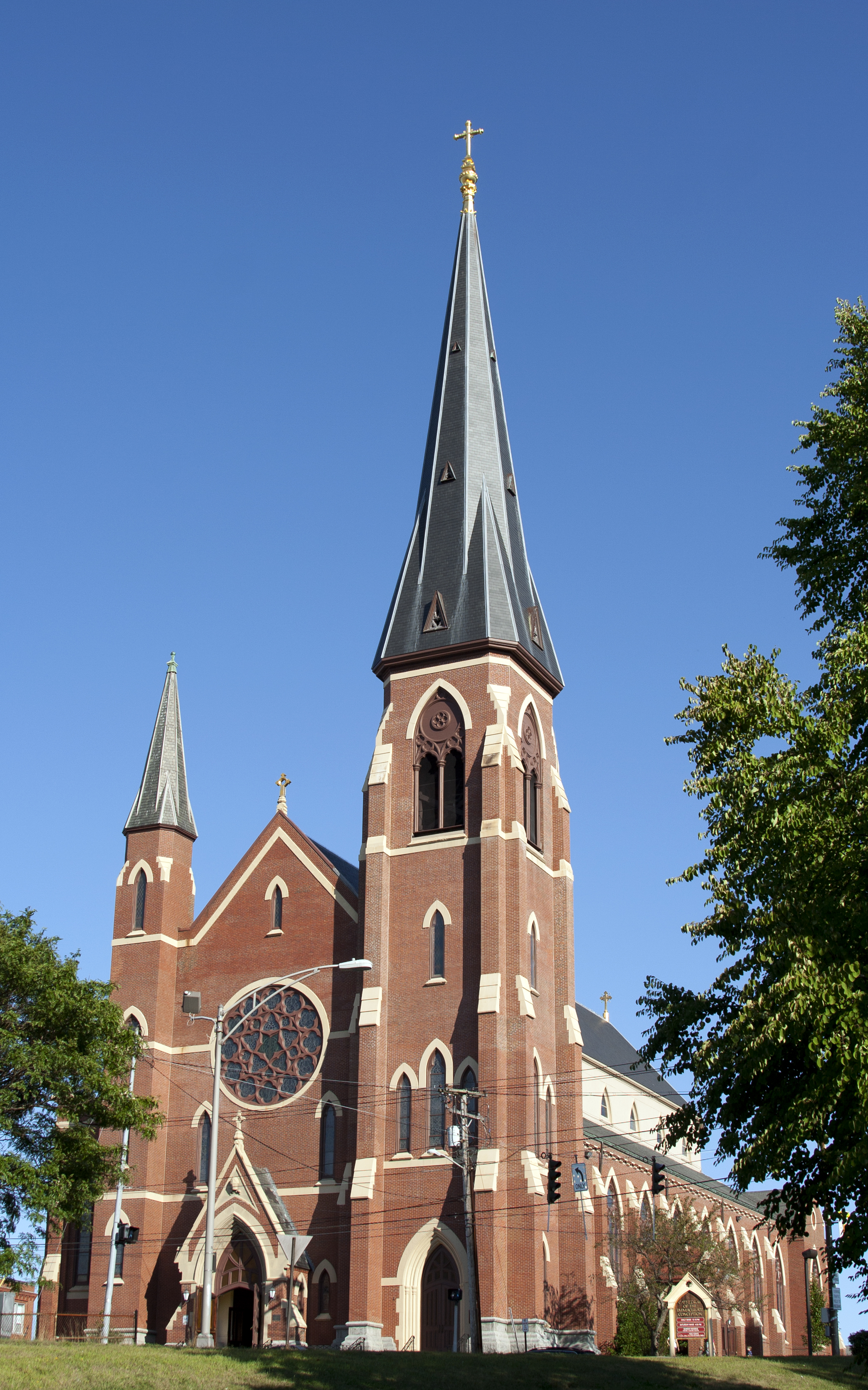

- Location within Maine Location within the United States
- Location: 307 Congress St; Portland, Maine
- Coordinates: 43°39′41″N 70°15′17″W
- Area: 2 acres (0.81 ha)
- Built: 1866
- Architect: P.C. Keeley
- Architectural style: Gothic Revival
- NRHP reference No.: 85001257
- Added to NRHP: June 20, 1985

The Cathedral of the Immaculate Conception is a historic cathedral on Cumberland Avenue in Portland, Maine, which serves as seat of the Diocese of Portland. The rector is Father Seamus Griesbach. The church, an imposing Gothic Revival structure built in 1866–69, was listed on the National Register of Historic Places in 1985. Until 2023, it was the tallest building in Portland. It was surpassed by 201 Federal Street.

== Architecture and history ==
The Roman Catholic diocese complex occupies most of a city block, bounded by Cumberland Avenue, Locust Street, Congress Street, and Franklin Street. The main church building is set on the northwest side of the property, facing Cumberland Avenue, while the parish hall extends northeast from its rear, and the bishop's residence stands to its southeast, facing Congress Street. To the left (south) of the residence stands a two-story school. Formerly the church-affiliated Kavanagh K-8 School, since 2013 the building has housed Portland Adult Education, the largest adult education institution in Maine.

The church is an imposing masonry structure, built of red brick, with sandstone trim and a slate roof. The main façade has a central entrance recessed in a sandstone Gothic arch, with a large stained glass rose window above. The main tower rises to the right of the main entrance, with buttressed corners, narrow Gothic windows, and an octagonal spire. Windows on the side walls are also Gothic, with buttressing between.

The interior of the cathedral is 186 by 70 feet (57 m × 21 m). The nave is 150 feet (46 m) long, rises 70 feet (21 m), and holds almost 1,000 worshipers. The tallest of the cathedral's three steeples is, at 204 feet (62 m)

Construction began in 1866 under the supervision of New York architect Patrick Keely. Construction of the church was interrupted by Portland's great 1866 fire, and it was not completed until September 8, 1869.The cathedral has undergone restorations in 1921, 1969, and 2000. In 1985, it was added to the National Register of Historic Places. The secondary buildings all have stylistically similar Gothic features.

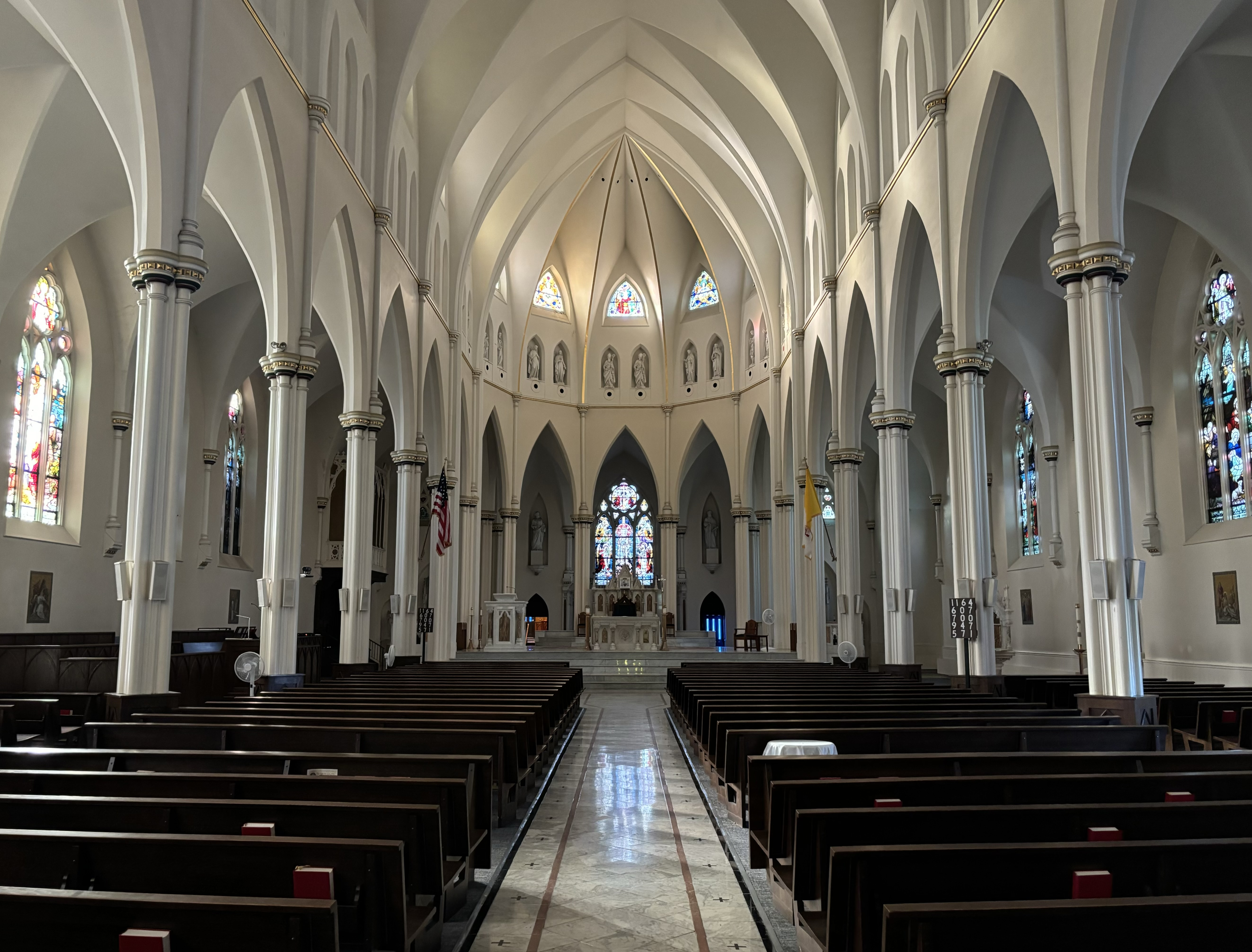
View up nave toward the sanctuary

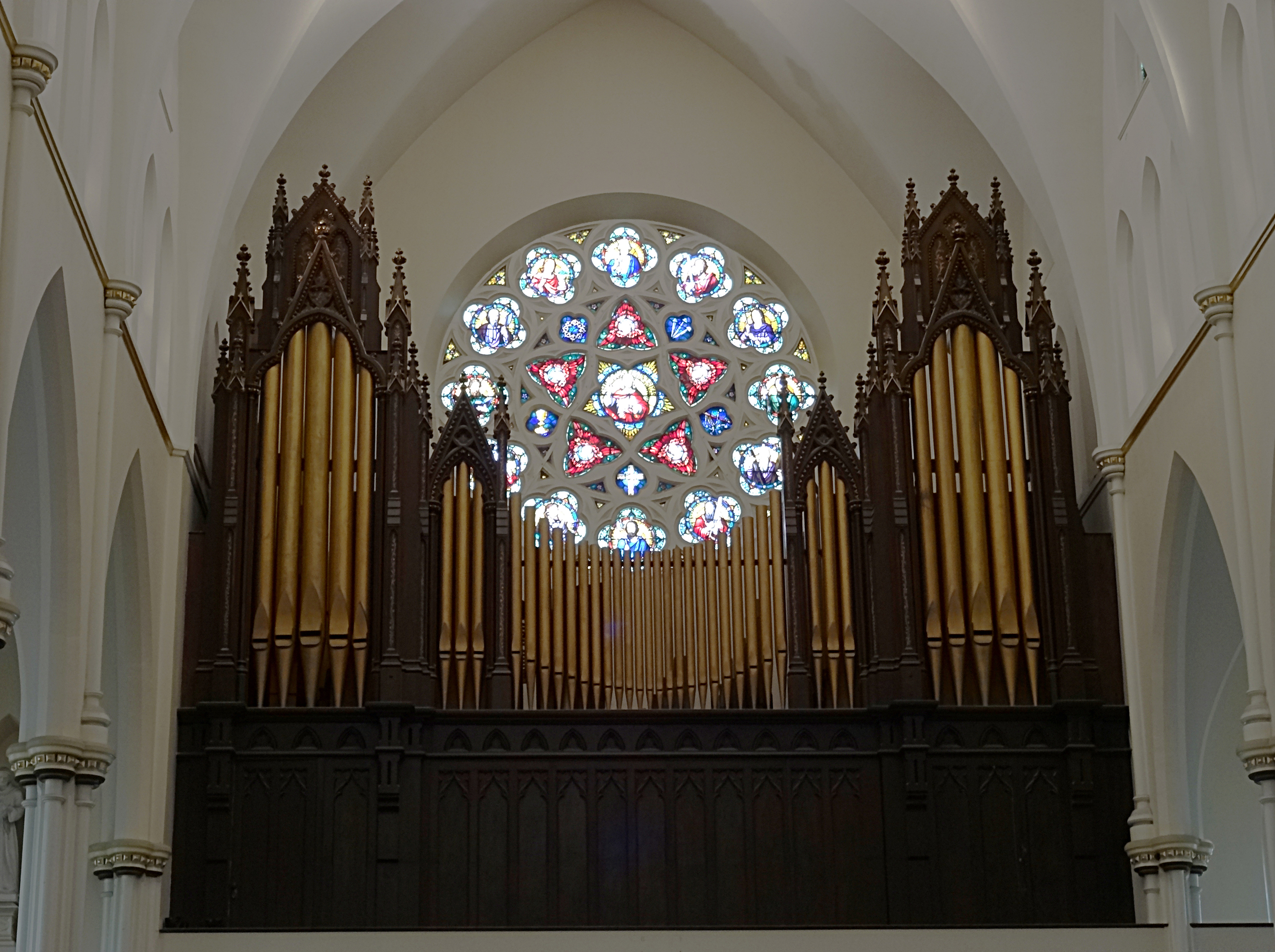
Organ by Henry Erben (1869)

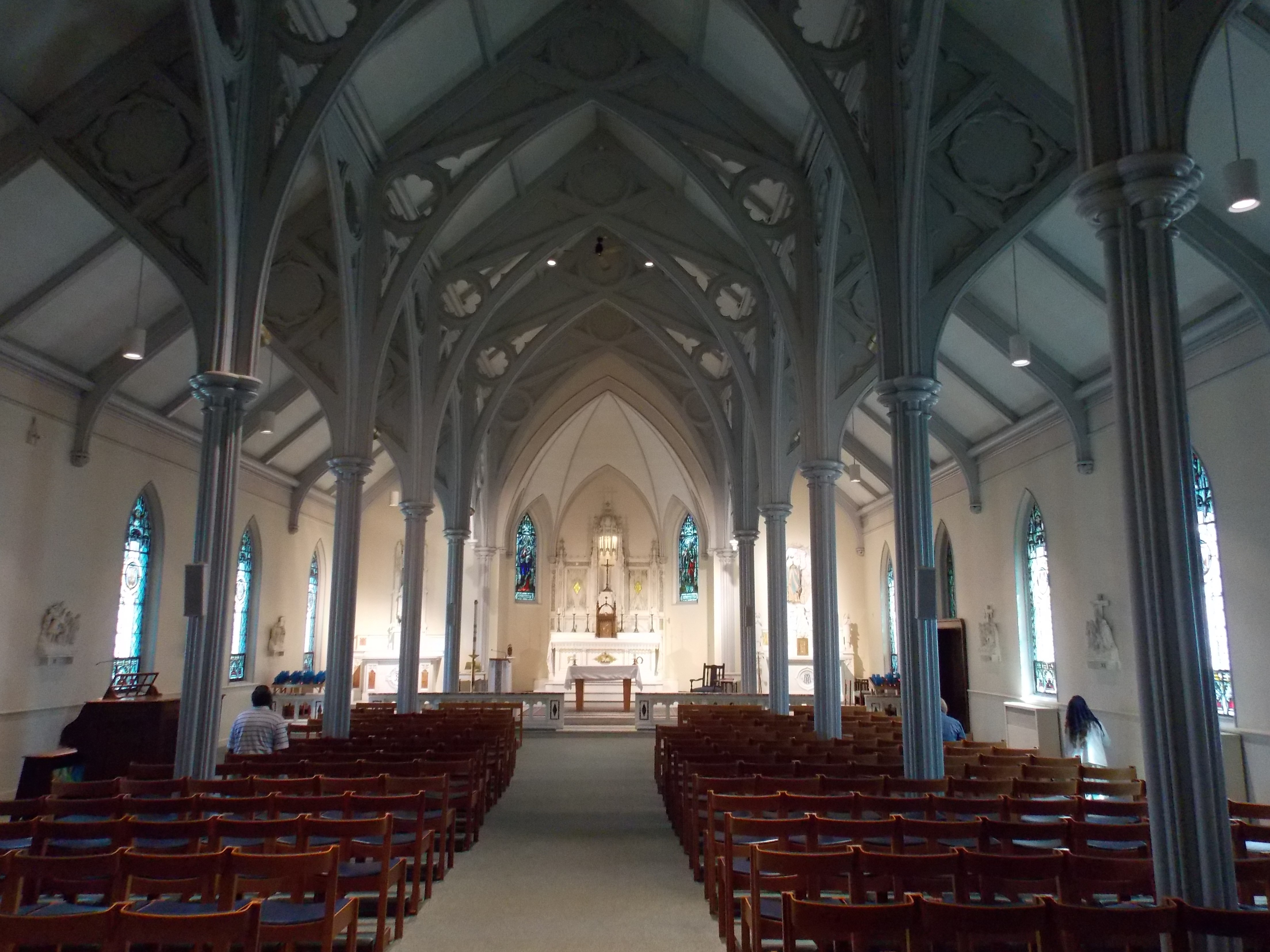
Chapel interior

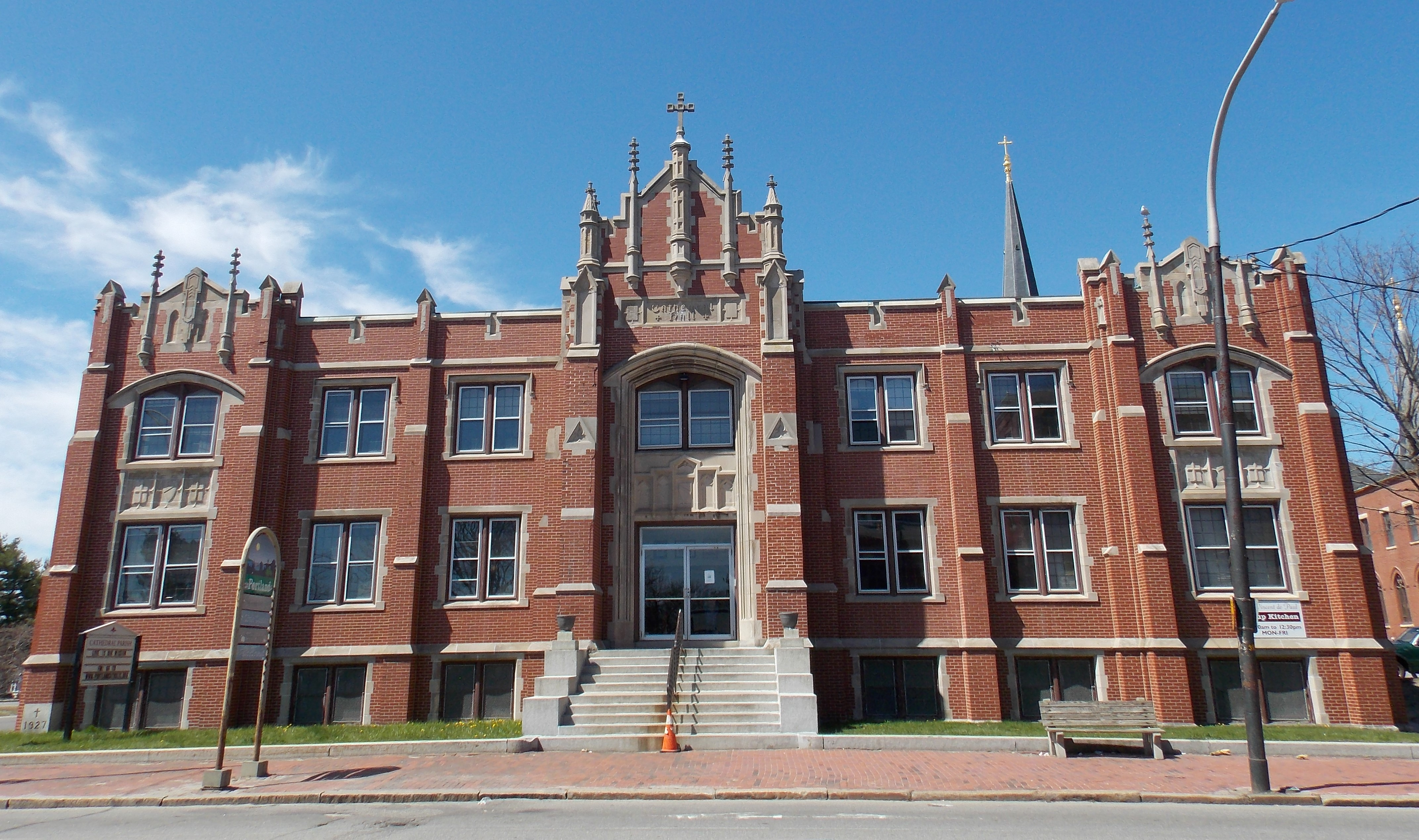
Guild Hall

== See also ==
- List of Catholic cathedrals in the United States
- List of cathedrals in the United States
- National Register of Historic Places listings in Portland, Maine
- List of tallest buildings in Maine
