= Louis Edward Gelineau =

North American Roman Catholic bishop (1928–2024)

His Excellency, The Most Reverend Louis Edward Gélineau
- Bishop of Providence
- Church: Roman Catholic Church
- Archdiocese: Hartford
- Diocese: Providence
- Appointed: December 6, 1971
- Installed: January 26, 1972
- Retired: June 11, 1997
- Predecessor: Russell McVinney
- Successor: Robert Edward Mulvee

Orders
- Ordination: June 5, 1953 by Edward Francis Ryan
- Consecration: January 26, 1972 by Robert Francis Joyce, Bernard Joseph Flanagan, and Edward Cornelius O'Leary

Personal details
- Born: May 3, 1928 Burlington, Vermont, U.S.
- Died: November 7, 2024 (aged 96) North Smithfield, Rhode Island, U.S.
- Motto: Rejoice in hope

Styles of Louis Edward Gélineau
- Reference style: His Excellency; The Most Reverend
- Spoken style: Your Excellency
- Religious style: Bishop

Louis Edward Gélineau (May 3, 1928 – November 7, 2024) was an American prelate of the Roman Catholic Church, serving as bishop of the Diocese of Providence in Rhode Island from 1972 to 1997.

After his retirement in 2004, Gelineau was named in multiple lawsuits regarding sexual abuse by priests in the diocese during his tenure as bishop.

== Biography ==
=== Early life ===
Louis Gélineau was born on May 3, 1928, into a French-Canadian family in Burlington, Vermont, to Leonidas and Juliette (née Baribault) Gélineau; he had an older brother, Robert. After attending St. Joseph's Elementary School and Cathedral High School in Burlington, he studied at St. Michael's College in Colchester, Vermont, for two years. Gélineau then entered St. Paul's University in Ottawa, Ontario, obtaining a Licentiate of Sacred Theology and a Bachelor of Philosophy degree.

=== Priesthood ===
Gélineau was ordained a priest at the Cathedral of the Immaculate Conception in Burlington by Bishop Edward Francis Ryan for the Diocese of Burlington on June 5, 1954. Gélineau was then assigned as assistant pastor at All Saints Parish in Richford, Vermont (1954–1956) and at St. Stephen Parish in Winooski, Vermont (1956–1957).

Gélineau was sent to Washington, D.C. to study at the Catholic University of America in 1957, earning a Licentiate of Canon Law in 1959. Returning to Vermont, he was named assistant chancellor of the diocese and secretary and master of ceremonies to Bishop Robert Joyce. He also served as director of the Society for the Propagation of the Faith and assistant chaplain at De Goesbriand Memorial Hospital in Vermont.

Gélineau became chancellor of the diocese in 1961 and was raised to the rank of papal chamberlain by Pope John XXIII. In 1968, he became vicar general of the diocese and was elevated by the Vatican to prelate of his holiness.

=== Bishop of Providence ===
On December 6, 1971, Pope Paul VI appointed Gélineau as the sixth bishop of Providence. He received his episcopal consecration at the Cathedral of Saints Peter and Paul in Providence, Rhode Island, on January 26, 1972, from Bishop Joyce, with Bishops Bernard Flanagan and Edward O'Leary serving as co-consecrators. In 1988, Gélineau declared that removing a feeding tube from 48-year-old Marcia Gray, a comatose Rhode Island woman, "does not contradict Catholic moral theology," but emphasized that he "in no way supports or condones the practice of euthanasia."

In 1985, Gélineau registered opposition to a 1985 ordinance for the City of Providence to protect LGBTQ+ people from discrimination. He said,

"Homosexual acts are contrary to God's command and contrary to his purpose in creating sex. To give support to this proposed legislation may easily be interpreted as supporting the homosexual lifestyle."

In 1995, when the Rhode Island Senate passed an LGBTQ+ rights bill, Gélineau stated, "If [proposed legislation] seeks to afford protection from unjust discrimination, which is not now afforded under our laws, then those laws should be changed."

In a 1997 legal deposition, Robert Cadorette accused Gélineau of abusing him when Gélineau was a brother assigned to St. Joseph’s Orphanage in Burlington in the 1950s. Cadorette claimed that on one occasion in 1951, Gélineau tried to pull down Cadorette's fly. When Cadorette ran away, Gélineau allegedly caught and tried to drown him. In a 1997 legal deposition, Gélineau denied any sexual misdeeds with an altar server in 1994.

== Retirement and legacy ==
Gélineau submitted his letter of resignation as bishop of Providence to Pope John Paul II. The pope accepted it on June 11, 1997. Gélineau became chaplain at St. Antoine Residence in North Smithfield, Rhode Island, in March 2004.

In a 2018 interview with the Providence Journal, Gélineau denied any intention to ever cover up sexual abuse crimes. In October 2019, Gelineau and the diocese were named in a lawsuit by Philip Edwardo. The plaintiff said that Gélineau helped perpetrate sexual abuse by Reverend Philip Magaldi against Edwardo when he was a minor between 1978 and 1983. In February 2020, Gélineau and the diocese were sued by Robert Houllahan, who alleged sexual abuse by Reverend Normand Demers. Houlihan claimed that Demers was also preying on other boys in Haitian orphanages and rectories in Rhode Island while the diocese was protecting him. Citing his advanced age, Gélineau declined comment on the lawsuit.

In March 2020, Gélineau was accused by Jeannette Costa, a parishioner in Cranston, Rhode Island, of ignoring a sexual abuse accusation by her son in 1993 against Reverend Daniel Azzarone. She had sent a letter to Gélineau in June 1993 after her son told her that Azzarone had fondled him during the 1980s. A diocesan lawyer contacted Costa in 1993 by a diocese lawyer, telling her that Azzarone's parish priest would supervise him. In response to this accusation in 2020, the diocese said that they had reported Azzarone in 1993 to a law enforcement agency in Rhode Island that declined his prosecution. Azzarone remained in ministry.

In November 2021, a Providence grand jury indicted Reverend James Silva on 11 counts of sexual assault between 1989 and 1990. The Providence Journal article mentioned a 1980 lawsuit against Gelineau from parents of a boy in Burrillville, Rhode Island, who claimed Silva assaulted him. Gélineau had then transferred Silva to St. Lucy's Parish in Middletown, Rhode Island, without notifying that parish or the authorities. When informed that Silva had molested a child at St. Lucy's, Gélineau's response was “Oh, no. Not again!"

Gelineau died at the St. Antoine Residence in North Smithfield, Rhode Island, on November 7, 2024, at the age of 96.

== See also ==
- Catholic Church hierarchy
- Catholic Church in the United States
- Historical list of the Catholic bishops of the United States
- List of Catholic bishops of the United States
- Lists of patriarchs, archbishops, and bishops

Catholic Church titles
Preceded by Russell McVinney	Bishop of Providence; 1972–1997	Succeeded by Robert Edward Mulvee
