= George Edward Rueger =

American Roman Catholic bishop (1929–2019)

The Most Reverend George Edward Rueger
- Auxiliary Bishop of Worcester
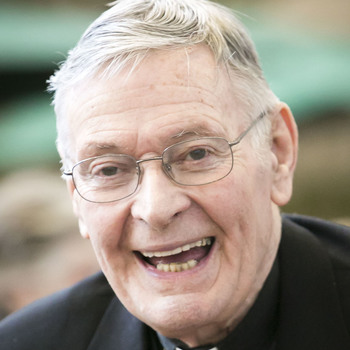
- See: Diocese of Worcester
- Appointed: January 16, 1987
- Installed: February 25, 1987
- Term ended: January 25, 2005

Orders
- Ordination: January 6, 1958 by John J. Wright
- Consecration: February 25, 1987 by Timothy Joseph Harrington, Bernard Joseph Flanagan, John Aloysius Marshall

Personal details
- Born: September 23, 1929 Framingham, Massachusetts, U.S.
- Died: April 6, 2019 (aged 89) Worcester, Massachusetts, U.S.
- Education: College of the Holy Cross; Saint John's Seminary; Harvard University
- Motto: That They All May Be One

Styles of George Edward Rueger
- Reference style: His Excellency; The Most Reverend
- Spoken style: Your Excellency
- Religious style: Bishop

George Edward Rueger (September 23, 1929 – April 6, 2019) was an American prelate of the Roman Catholic Church who served as auxiliary bishop of the Diocese of Worcester in Massachusetts from 1987 to 2005.

== Biography ==
=== Early life ===
George Rueger was born on September 23, 1929, in Framingham, Massachusetts, the son of Edward G. and Mary T. (Reddy) Rueger. He attended Framingham South High School and St. Peter High School in Worcester. After attending the College of the Holy Cross in Worcester from 1949 to 1950, he entered Cardinal O’Connor Minor Seminary in Boston. He completed his studies for the priesthood at Saint John's Seminary in Boston. He also did post-graduate studies at Harvard University.

=== Priesthood ===
Rueger was ordained a priest by then Bishop John J. Wright on January 6, 1958, for the Diocese of Worcester at St. Paul Cathedral in Worcester. After his ordination, Rueger was appointed as an assistant pastor at Our Lady of Lourdes Parish in Millbury, Massachusetts. He was later transferred to St. Peter Parish in Worcester.

In 1965, Rueger was appointed as headmaster of Marian Central Catholic High School, Worcester. He became assistant pastor in 1974 of Our Lady of the Lake Parish in Leominster, Massachusetts. In 1976, Rueger was elected president of the diocesan Senate of Priests and appointed pastor of Sacred Heart of Jesus Parish in Hopedale, Massachusetts, in 1977.

On August 1, 1978, Rueger became superintendent of Catholic schools for the diocese while continuing his pastoral assignment in Hopedale. On Dec. 1, 1980 he returned to full-time ministry in Hopedale. In 1981, he was named pastor of St. Peter Parish.

=== Auxiliary Bishop of Worcester ===
On January 16, 1987, Pope John Paul II appointed Rueger as an auxiliary bishop of the Diocese of Worcester and titular bishop of Maronana. He was consecrated by Bishop Timothy Harrington on February 25, 1987. He was appointed as vicar general for the diocese and 1998 also became moderator of the curia.

In July 2002, Rueger was sued by a man who claimed he sexually abused him when he was a 13 year old altar boy. Rueger denied all the charges. Sime Braio claimed that Rueger started abusing him when he was a priest at Our Lady of Lourdes Parish. The diocese had previously investigated the allegations and determined them to be false. Notified of the allegations, the district attorney declined to prosecute Rueger. Braio dropped the lawsuit in 2003.

=== Retirement ===
In 2004, having reached the mandatory retirement age of 75 for bishops, Rueger submitted his resignation as bishop of the Diocese of Worcester to Pope John Paul. That same year, the Vincent de Paul Society gave Rueger its Collaborative Award for Education and Ministry award.

On January 25, 2005, Pope Benedict XVI accepted Rueger's resignation. George Rueger died on April 6, 2019, at the age of 89.

== See also ==
- Catholic Church in the United States
- Hierarchy of the Catholic Church
- Historical list of the Catholic bishops of the United States
- List of Catholic bishops in the United States
- Lists of popes, patriarchs, primates, archbishops, and bishops

== Episcopal succession ==
Catholic Church titles
Preceded by –	Auxiliary Bishop Emeritus of Worcester; 2005 – 2019	Succeeded by Incumbent
Preceded by –	Auxiliary Bishop of Worcester; 1987 – 2005	Succeeded by –
