= Timothy Joseph Harrington =

American Catholic bishop (1918–1997)

His Excellency, The Most Reverend Timothy Joseph Harrington
- Bishop of Worcester; Titular Bishop of Rusuca
- Church: Catholic Church
- See: Diocese of Worcester
- Appointed: September 1, 1983
- Installed: October 13, 1983
- Term ended: October 27, 1994
- Predecessor: Bernard Joseph Flanagan
- Successor: Daniel Patrick Reilly
- Previous post: Auxiliary Bishop of Worcester (1968 to 1983)

Orders
- Ordination: January 19, 1946 by Thomas Michael O'Leary
- Consecration: July 2, 1968 by Bernard Joseph Flanagan, John Joseph Wright, and Christopher Joseph Weldon

Personal details
- Born: December 19, 1918 Holyoke, Massachusetts, U.S.
- Died: March 23, 1997 (aged 78) Worcester, Massachusetts, U.S.
- Education: College of the Holy Cross (BA); Grand Séminaire de Montréal; Boston College (MSW)
- Motto: To serve, not to be served

Styles of Timothy Joseph Harrington
- Reference style: His Excellency; The Most Reverend
- Spoken style: Your Excellency
- Religious style: Bishop

Timothy Joseph Harrington (December 19, 1918 – March 23, 1997) was an American clergyman of the Catholic Church. He served as bishop of the Diocese of Worcester in Massachusetts from 1983 to 1994. He previously served as an auxiliary bishop of the same diocese from 1968 to 1983.

== Biography ==
=== Early life ===
Timothy Harrington was born on December 19, 1918, in Holyoke, Massachusetts, United States. He graduated from the College of the Holy Cross in Worcester, Massachusetts in 1941. Harrington studied at the Grand Seminary of Montreal in Montreal, Quebec, before returning to Boston, where he earned a Master of Social Work degree from Boston College.

=== Priesthood ===
Harrington was ordained to the priesthood for the Diocese of Springfield in Massachusetts by Bishop Thomas O'Leary on January 19, 1946. He then served as a curate at St. Bernard's Parish in Worcester until 1951. That year, Harrington became chaplain at Nazareth Home for Boys in Leicester, Massachusetts and began work with Catholic Charities. He served as director of the House of Our Lady of the Way (1957–1960) and director of Catholic Charities (1960–1968). Harrington was named a papal chamberlain by Pope John XXIII in 1960.

=== Auxiliary Bishop and Bishop of Worcester ===
On April 2, 1968, Harrington was appointed as an auxiliary bishop of Worcester and titular bishop of Rusuca by Pope Paul VI. He received his episcopal consecration on July 2, 1968, from Bishop Bernard Flanagan, with Bishops John Wright and Christopher Weldon serving as co-consecrators. Harrington became chief financial officer of the diocese in 1968, and was named chancellor in 1975.

Harrington was appointed as the third bishop of Worcester by Pope John Paul II on September 1, 1983. His installation took place at the Cathedral of St. Paul in Worcester on October 13, 1983.

=== Retirement ===
Upon reaching the mandatory retirement age of 75, Harrington submitted his letter of resignation as bishop of Worcester to John Paul II in December 1993. The pope accept his resignation was accepted on October 27, 1994, and named Bishop Daniel Reilly as his successor.

Timothy Harrington died on March 23, 1997, in Worcester at age 78.

Catholic Church titles
Preceded by Bernard Joseph Flanagan	Bishop of Worcester; 1983—1994	Succeeded by Daniel Patrick Reilly
