= Rueger =

Rueger or Rüeger is a surname. Notable people with the surname include:

- George Edward Rueger (1929–2019), American Roman Catholic bishop
- Ronnie Rüeger (born 1973), Swiss ice hockey player
