= Diocese of Worcester =

Diocese of Worcester may refer to:

- Anglican Diocese of Worcester, England
- Diocese of Worcester, Massachusetts, United States, a Latin Church diocese of the Catholic Church
