= Moses Anderson =

Roman Catholic prelate

His Excellency, The Most Reverend Moses B. Anderson SSE
- Auxiliary Bishop of Detroit
- Church: Roman Catholic
- Archdiocese: Detroit
- Installed: December 2, 1982
- Term ended: October 24, 2003
- Other posts: Titular Bishop of Vatarba; Pastor of Precious Blood Parish, Detroit (1992-2001)

Orders
- Ordination: May 30, 1958 by Robert Francis Joyce
- Consecration: January 27, 1983 by Edmund Szoka, Harold Robert Perry, and Arthur Henry Krawczak

Personal details
- Born: September 9, 1928 Selma, Alabama, U.S.
- Died: January 1, 2013 (aged 84) Livonia, Michigan, U.S.
- Education: Saint Michael's College; Xavier University
- Motto: Unity in diversity

Moses Bosco Anderson SSE (September 9, 1928 – January 1, 2013) was an American prelate in the Catholic Church who served as an auxiliary bishop of the Archdiocese of Detroit in Michigan from 1982 to 2003. He was a member of the Society of St. Edmund (Edmundites)

== Biography ==
=== Early life ===
Moses Anderson was born on September 9, 1928, in Selma, Alabama, to Henry and Nancy King Anderson. Raised a Baptist, Anderson attended a Presbyterian primary school in Selma. He then continued his education at Knox Academy, a Reformed Presbyterian high school for African-Americans. While, he started secretly receiving instruction on Catholicism. In 1949, the year of his graduation, Anderson received his first communion.

Deciding to become a priest, Anderson joined the Edmundites and started attending classes at Xavier University of Louisiana in New Orleans. The Edmundites then sent him to Saint Michael's College in Winooski, Vermont, where graduated magna cum laude with a Bachelor of Arts degree in philosophy. Anderson continued his studies at Saint Edmund's Seminary in Burlington, Vermont.

=== Priesthood ===
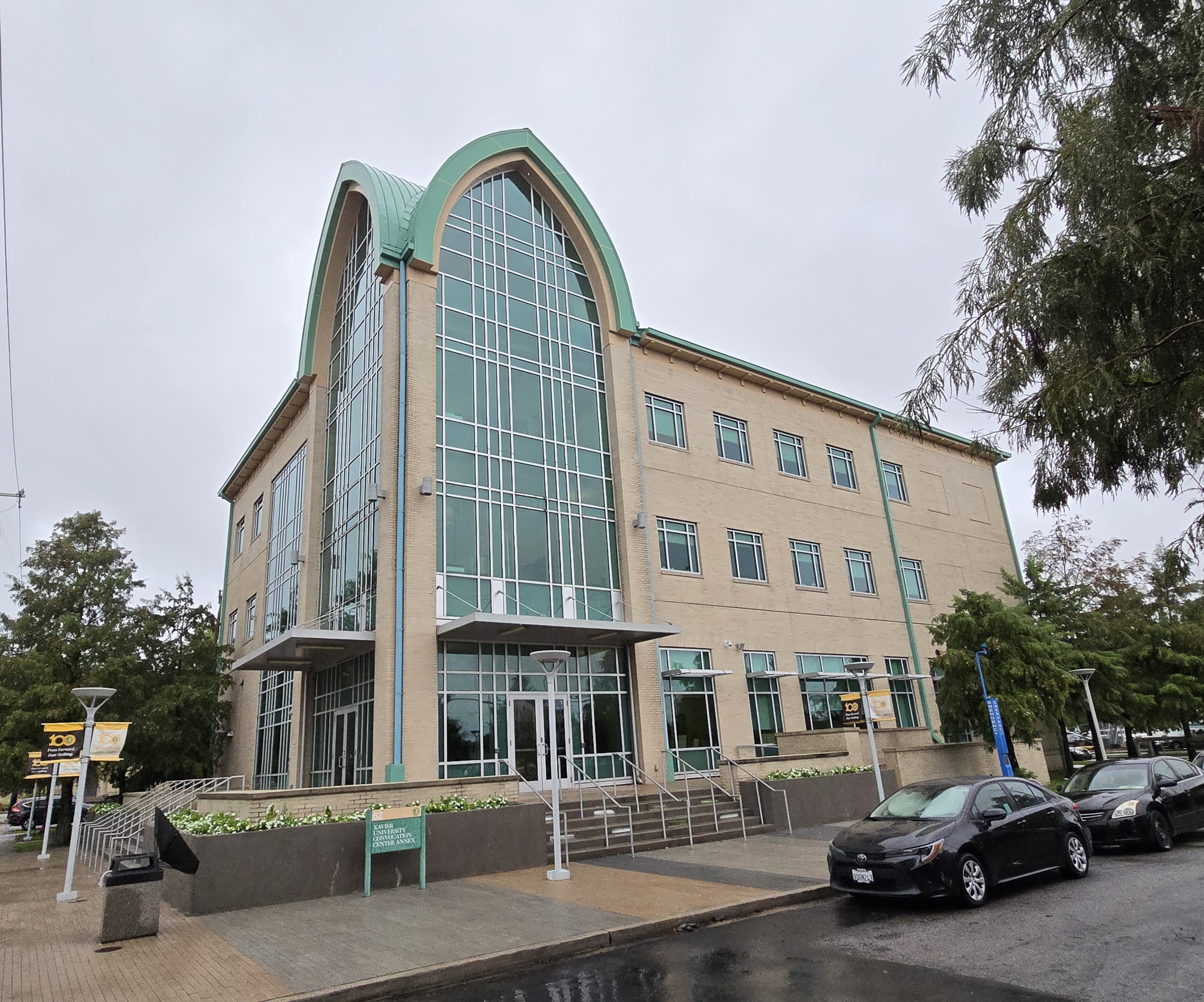
Xavier University of Louisiana, New Orleans (2024)

Anderson was ordained a priest for the Society of St. Edmund in Burlington on May 30, 1958 by Bishop Robert Francis Joyce. After a year as an associate pastor at Our Lady of Consolation Church in Charlotte, North Carolina, the Edmundites assigned Anderson as pastor of St. Catherine Parish in Elizabeth City, North Carolina. Anderson earned a Master of Science degree in sociology at Saint Michael's in 1961. In 1964, he returned to Vermont to teach theology at Saint Michael's. He also received a Master of Arts degree in theology and natural law from Xavier University in 1968.

Anderson in 1971 was appointed to the faculty and administration of Xavier University. During this period, he also taught at Notre Dame Seminary in New Orleans and took coursework at the University of Ghana in Accra, Ghana. The Edmundites in 1981 assigned Anderson as pastor of All Saints Parish in Anniston, Alabama.

=== Auxiliary Bishop of Detroit ===
Anderson was appointed auxiliary bishop of Detroit and titular bishop of Vatarba by Pope John Paul II on December 3, 1982. He was consecrated at the Cathedral of the Most Blessed Sacrament in Detroit on January 27, 1983 by Archbishop Edmund Szoka. He served as pastor of Precious Blood Parish in Detroit from 1992 until 2001.

Anderson made several pastoral trips to Ghana, where he was honored in 1990 as a chief of the Asante people. Anderson worked to build schools and missions in the Turks and Caicos Islands. In 1994, Anderson was put in charge of Region 1 of the archdiocese which includes Detroit, Highland Park, Hamtramck, Grosse Pointe and Harper Woods.

=== Retirement and death ===
Anderson retired on October 24, 2003 upon reaching the age of 75. He died on January 1, 2013, in Livonia, Michigan, from cardiac arrest.
