= St. Mary's Schools (Worcester, Massachusetts) =

Coordinates: 42.251°N 71.797°W

St. Mary's Elementary School and St. Mary's Jr./Sr. High School, known as St. Mary's Schools

Location
- 50 Richland St. Worcester, Worcester, MA 01610; United States

Information
- Type: Private, Coeducational
- Motto: Non Scholae, Sed Vitae (Not only for School, but for Life)
- Religious affiliation: Roman Catholic
- Established: 1915
- Superintendent: Dr. Delma Josephson
- Principal: Monica Campbell
- Head of school: Rev. Richard Polek
- Teaching staff: 25
- Grades: Pre-K through Grade 12
- Average class size: 15
- Student to teacher ratio: 12:1
- Colors: Red and White
- Athletics: Soccer, Volleyball, Basketball, Track, Softball, Baseball
- Athletics conference: Worcester County Athletic Conference
- Mascot: Polish Eagle
- Team name: Eagles
- Tuition: $4500-$6650
- Affiliation: Our Lady of Czestochowa Parish
- Website: www.stmarysworcester.org
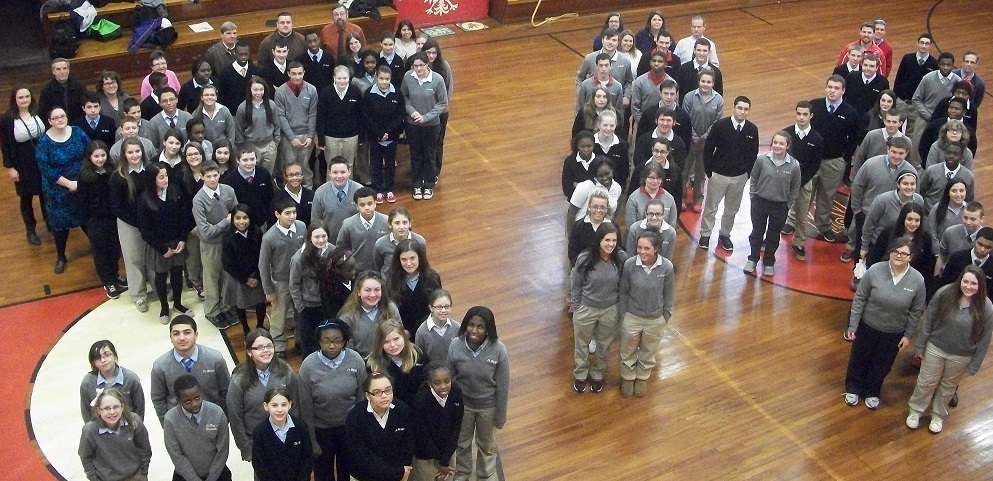

St. Mary's Elementary School and St. Mary's Jr./Sr. High School, known as St. Mary's Schools, were private, Roman Catholic Schools in Worcester, Massachusetts serving Pre-K through Grade 12. It was located in the Vernon Hill section of Worcester, Massachusetts in the Roman Catholic Diocese of Worcester. It closed at the end of the 2020 school year.

== History ==
The construction of St. Mary's Elementary began in 1914. The school first opened its doors in 1915 to provide primary school education for the children of Our Lady of Czestochowa Parish. In 1936, St. Mary's School expanded to include high school and graduated its first senior class in 1940. St. Mary's Schools were originally staffed exclusively by nuns from the Sisters of the Holy Family of Nazareth but, by the end of its existence, the faculty was entirely lay.
