= Our Lady of the Angels Parish (Worcester, Massachusetts) =

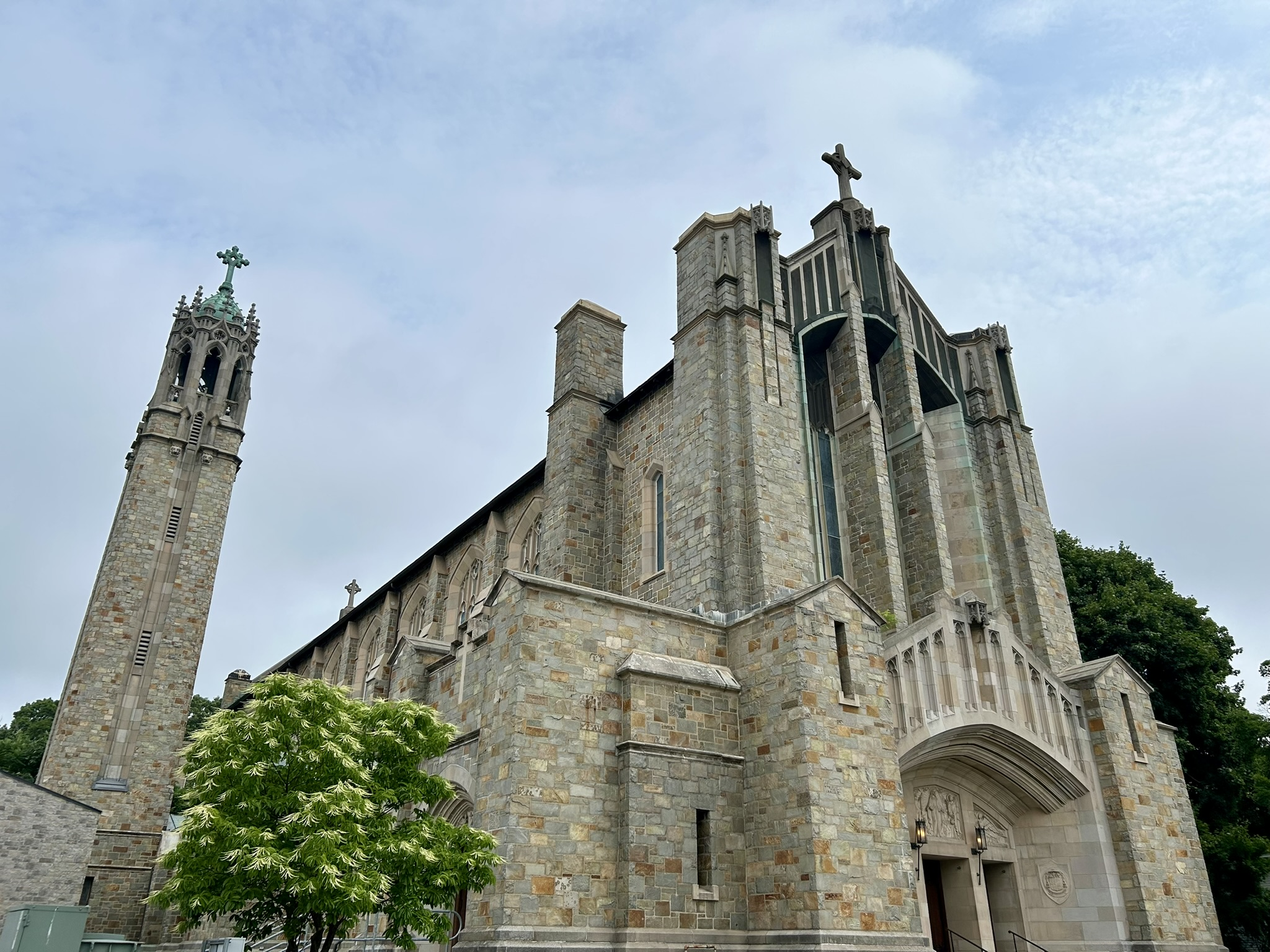

- Location in Massachusetts
- 42°14′37″N 71°50′29″W
- Location: 1222 Main St. Worcester, Massachusetts
- Country: United States
- Denomination: Roman Catholic
- Website: olaworcester.org

History
- Consecrated: 1928

Architecture
- Style: Gothic Revival architecture
- Years built: 1927-1928
- Groundbreaking: 1927
- Completed: 1928
- Construction cost: $350,000

Specifications
- Capacity: 1000

Administration
- Diocese: Roman Catholic Diocese of Worcester

Our Lady of the Angels Parish is a Roman Catholic church in Worcester, Massachusetts.

== History ==
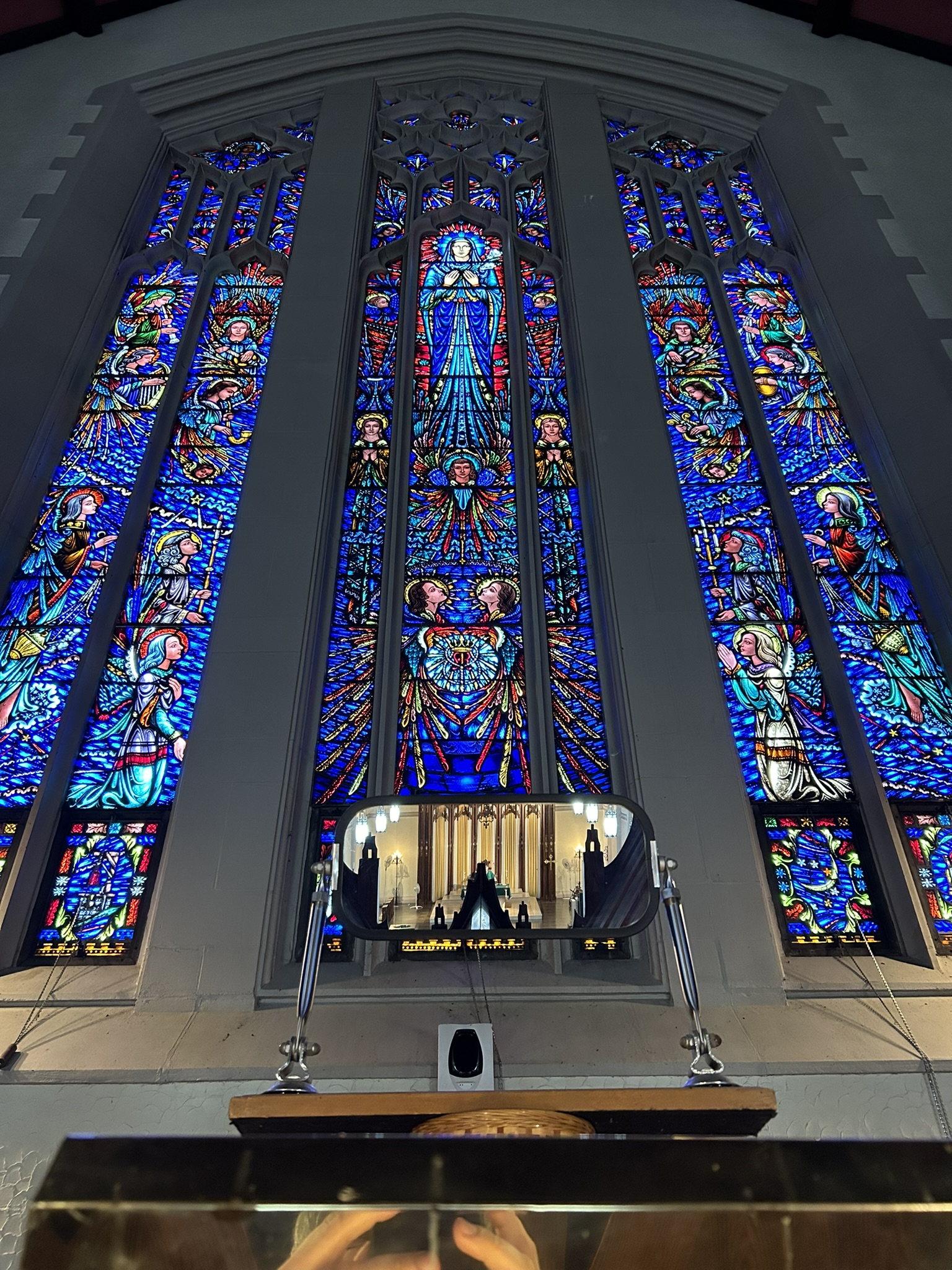
The great gable window

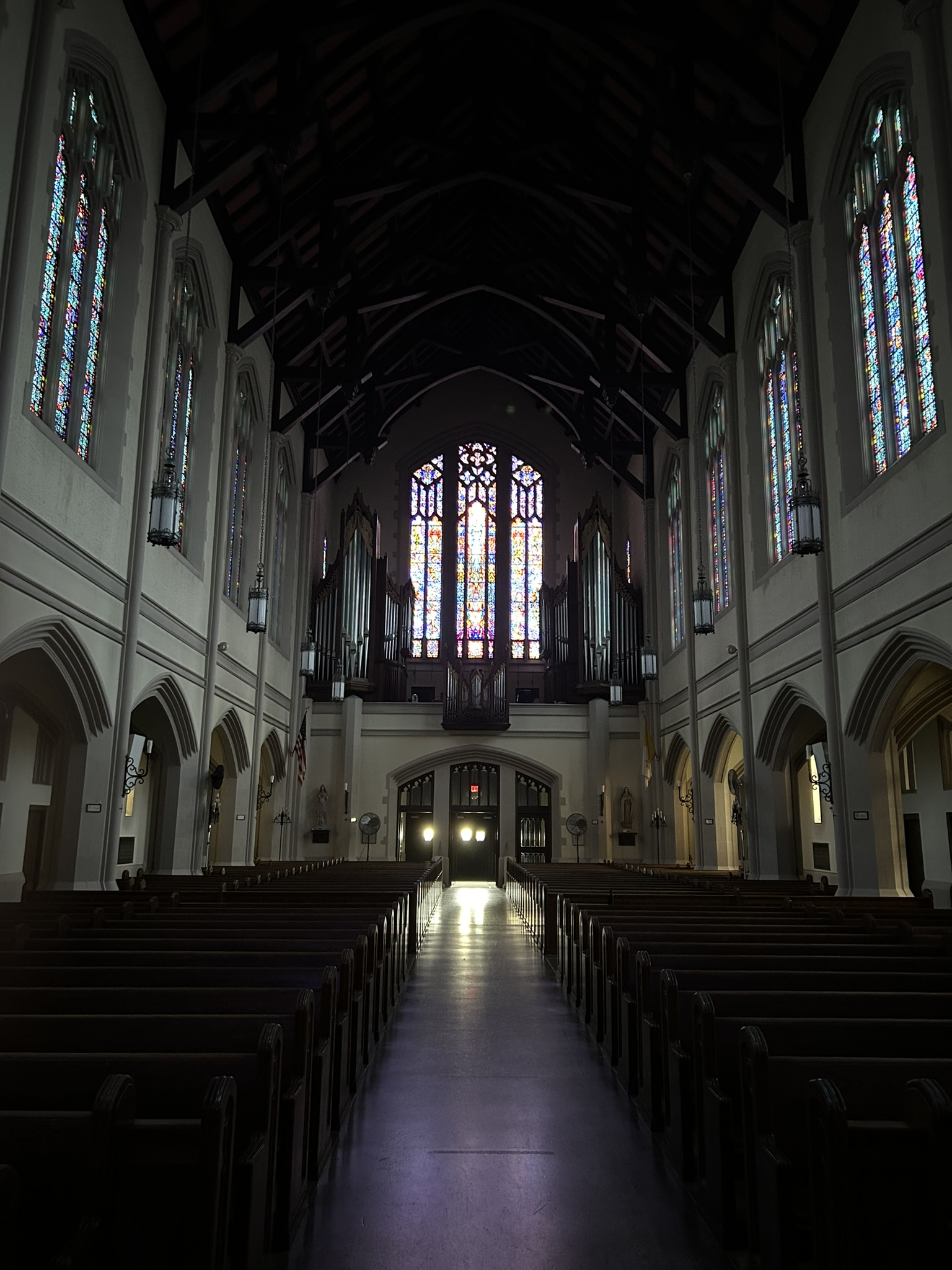
The J. W. Walker organ

Organized in 1916, the first Mass was celebrated in the auditorium of the Gates Lane School on October 8, 1916, by the church's first pastor, Fr. Michael J. O'Connell. On February 4 of the following year, Masses were moved to a repurposed barn on Main and Montague Streets, seating 300 people.

In 1926, plans for a new, much larger Neo-Gothic building were drawn. and the cornerstone was laid on June 19 of the following year. The architect was George B. Haynes of Pittsfield, Massachusetts. The building was constructed by Keefe Brothers of Worcester. With a seating capacity of 1000, the new church was at the time one of the largest Neo-Gothic edifices in Central Massachusetts. The first Mass in the new building was held on Christmas, 1928.

Within ten years of its construction, the building started to show signed of structural problems caused by water damage. In 1984, after 42 years of deliberation, a $600,000 Restoration Fund Drive was finally inaugurated. The second cornerstone was laid on May 12, 1985. Part of the restoration included the installation of a new J. W. Walker & Sons Ltd pipe organ. Incredibly, this was the first legitimate pipe organ in the church's history, replacing a cabinet organ. The instrument arrived from England on Columbus Day, 1984. On December 8, 1985, it was dedicated by Bishop Bernard J. Flanagan. The inaugural recital was given by Dame Gillian Weir on February 11, 1986

== Architecture ==
The church is known for its stained glass windows, designed by John Terrance O'Duggan. In designing the organ, Walker took great pains not to cover the Great Gable Window, depicting Our Lady of the Angels surrounded by nine choirs of celestial spirits.
