= Cathedral of Saint Paul (Worcester, Massachusetts) =

Catholic cathedral in Massachusetts, US

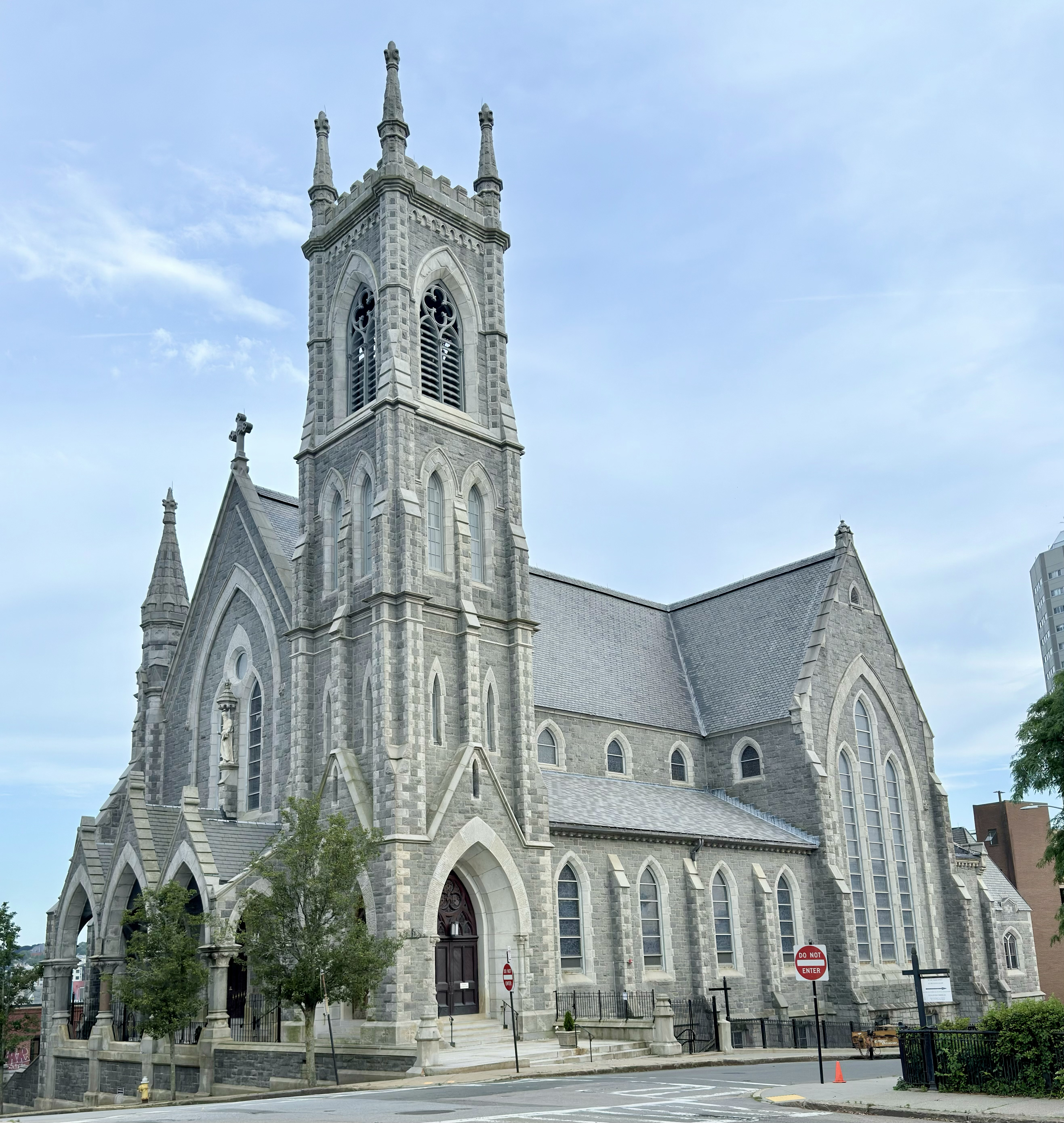
- Cathedral of Saint Paul in 2025

- Location in Massachusetts
- 42°15′42″N 71°48′15″W
- Location: 38 Chatham St. Worcester, Massachusetts
- Country: United States
- Denomination: Catholic Church
- Sui iuris church: Latin Church
- Website: www.cathedralofsaintpaul.net

History
- Founded: 1869

Architecture
- Architect: E. Boyden & Son
- Style: Gothic Revival
- Completed: 1874

Specifications
- Length: 168 feet (51 m)
- Width: 91 feet (28 m)
- Height: 96 feet (29 m)
- Materials: Granite, wood

Administration
- Diocese: Worcester

Clergy
- Bishop: Most Rev. Robert J. McManus
- Rector: Reverend Hugo A. Cano
- Cathedral of Saint Paul
- U.S. National Register of Historic Places
- MPS: Worcester MRA
- NRHP reference No.: 80000604
- Added to NRHP: March 5, 1980

The Cathedral of Saint Paul — also known as Saint Paul's Cathedral — is the mother church of the Diocese of Worcester, Massachusetts. It is located at 38 Chatham Street in downtown Worcester, Massachusetts, in the United States.

Built between 1868 and 1889, Saint Paul is an example of Victorian Gothic architecture. It was listed on the National Register of Historic Places in 1980.

== Architecture ==
The Cathedral of Saint Paul stands in downtown Worcester, facing north on the south side of Chatham Street at High Street, one block west of Main Street.

== Cathedral Exterior ==
Saint Paul Cathedral is 168 feet (51 m) in length, 91 feet (28 m) in width, and 96 feet (29 m) in height. It is a large stone cruciform structure, with built-out rock-faced granite blocks. The main facade consists of a tall square tower on the right, the gabled end of the nave at the center, and a smaller square tower topped by a round turret on the left.

The cathedral entrances are located in the base of the large tower and in projecting Gothic-arched sections in front of the nave. The main roof is steeply pitched, with a cross at the front gable end and tall Gothic windows in the gables at the nave and transepts.

A statue of St. Francis of Assisi occupies the small courtyard outside the cathedral.

== Cathedral interior ==
=== Sanctuary ===
Located in the center of the cathedral sanctuary is the green and white marble altar. The front of the altar displays a bas relief carving of the Last Supper. The cathedra is located near the altar surrounded by a carved oak reredos.

A shield over the cathedral displays the coat of arms for the diocese and for the current bishop. The ambo, or pulpit, was constructed of the same marble as the altar. The large crucifix hanging over the altar was carved in Bavaria in Germany.

=== Baptismal font ===
The baptismal font is located to the right of the sanctuary. Behind the font is a cabinet that houses the holy oil.

=== Shrines ===
The cathedral contains four shrines:

- Blessed Virgin Mary Shrine – located in the front of the cathedral, this shrine contains statues of the Blessed Virgin Mary and Saint Joseph.
- Our Lady of Guadalupe Shrine – located in the back of the cathedral, this shrine has a statue commemorating the vision of Our Lady of Guadalupe in Mexico in 1531 to Juan Diego.
- Divino Niño and Saint Josephine Bakhita Shrine – also in the back of the cathedral, this shrine has images of the Divino Niño (Divine Child Jesus) and Josephine Bakhita, a Sudanese saint.
- Divine Mercy Shrine – located by the confessional, this image commemorates the appearance of Christ before Faustina Kowlska, a Polish saint.

=== Windows ===
==== Nave and sanctuary ====
The cathedral contains 11 windows that illustrate the life of the Apostle Paul:

- Paul on a mountain traveling to Pisidia (in present-day Turkey)
- Three women who helped Paul: Phoebe, Lydia of Thyatira and Thecla
- St. Timothy, a companion of Paul, at Timothy's home in Lycaonia (now in Turkey)
- The burning of magic books by the people of Ephesus (now in Turkey) to imitate Paul
- Paul reincarnates a man who falls out of a window in Troas
- Paul is bitten by a snake after the shipwreck in Malta, but is unharmed.
- Paul's disciples in Tyre (present-day Lebanon) plead with him not to go to Jerusalem
- Two women use Paul's cloak to heal a sick man in Ephesus
- An earthquake frees Paul from prison in Philippi (in present-day Greece)
- Paul sitting by a stream with Timothy and Silas nearby in Philippi
- Paul executed on the road to Ostia (in present-day Italy)

==== Clerestory ====
The clerestory in the upper part of the cathedral contains windows that display symbols of the apostles and saints.

- Lamb of God (John the Baptist)
- Dalmatic, palm and censor, (St. Stephen)
- shells and traveling bag (Apostle James the Greater)
- Crowing rooster and keys (Apostle Peter)
- Eagle and chalice with snake (Apostle John)
- Fish and anchor (Apostle Andrew)
- Sword and three knives; cross, dragon and fish (Apostle Bartholomew)
- Square, arrows, spears (Apostle Thomas)
- Book, fish, and battle axe (Apostle Simon)
- Saw, tower and stones (Apostle James the Lesser)
- Open book, battle axe and sword (Apostle Philip)

== History ==
=== Saint Paul Church ===
During the 1860s, Worcester had two parishes, St. John's and St. Anne's, both under the jurisdiction of the Archdiocese of Boston. In 1866, Archbishop John Williams allowed John Power, the pastor of St. Anne's, to purchase a property in Worcester for a new mission church.

Power broke ground on the new church in 1868, hiring the architects E. Boyden & Son to design the building. The first services were held in the church basement in 1869. Saint Paul Church was dedicated in 1875. In 1889, the parish completed construction of the bell tower for the church.

=== Cathedral of Saint Paul ===
In 1950, Pope Pius XII erected the Diocese of Worcester and appointed John J. Wright as its first bishop. On March 7, 1950, Wright elevated Saint Paul Church to the Cathedral of Saint Paul. In 1952, the diocese added a white Botticino marble wainscoting to the sanctuary. The crucifix in the vestibule was added in 1953.

After the Second Vatican Council of the early 1960s, the diocese made some changes in the church layout to follow liturgical reforms of the Council. These included moving the choir to the front of the cathedral. In 1996, the diocese replace the existing altar, installed in 1902, with a green and white marble altar. At the same time, a shrine was added to house the tabernacle.

In 2021, the diocese began a major renovation of Saint Paul. The roof and some windows were replaced and the outside masonry was repaired. The diocese launched a campaign in 2026 to raised $500,000 for structural repairs to the bell tower and an upgrade to its electrical and mechanical systems.

Cathedral Images

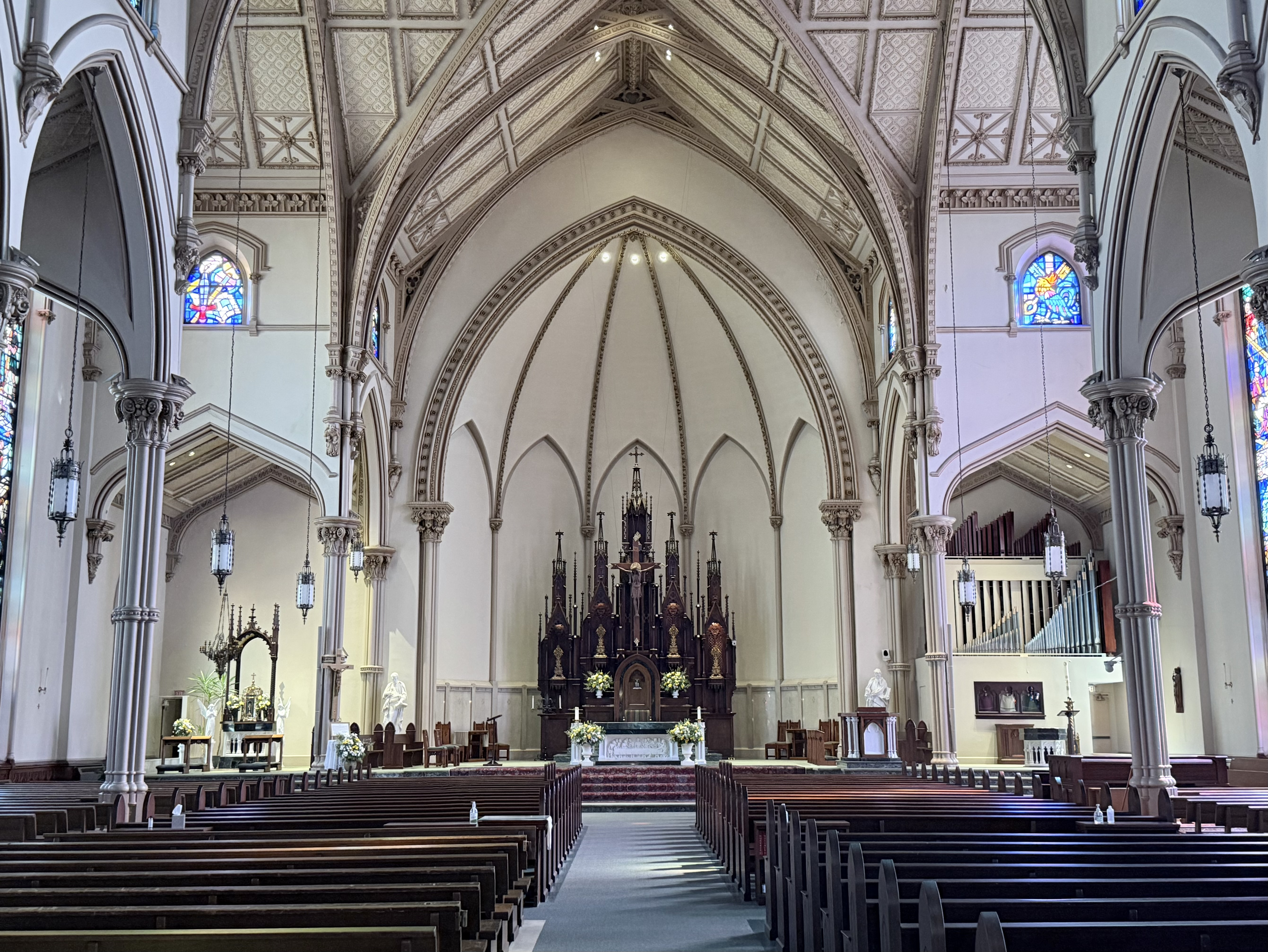
View up the nave toward the altar

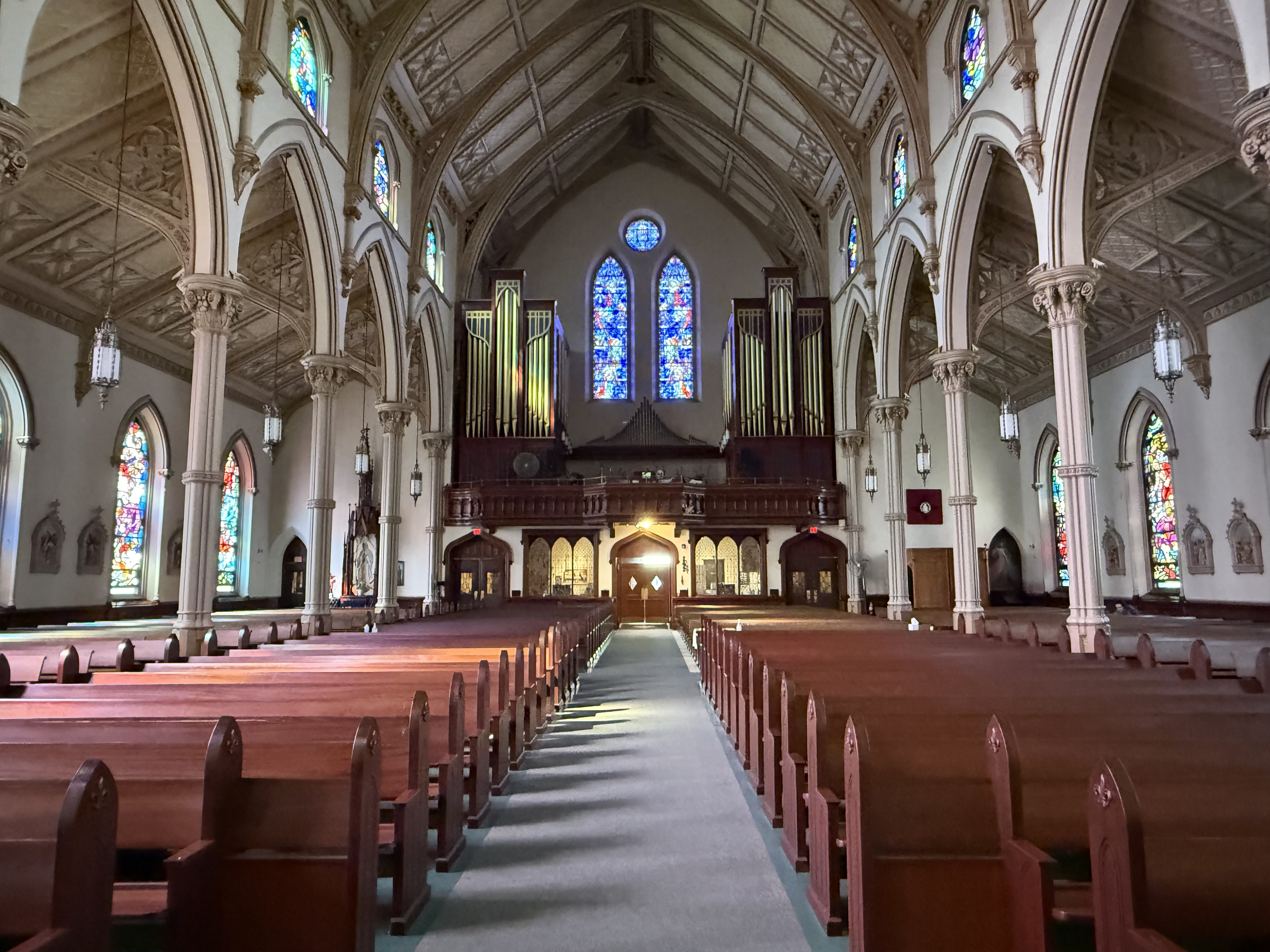
View down the nave toward gallery

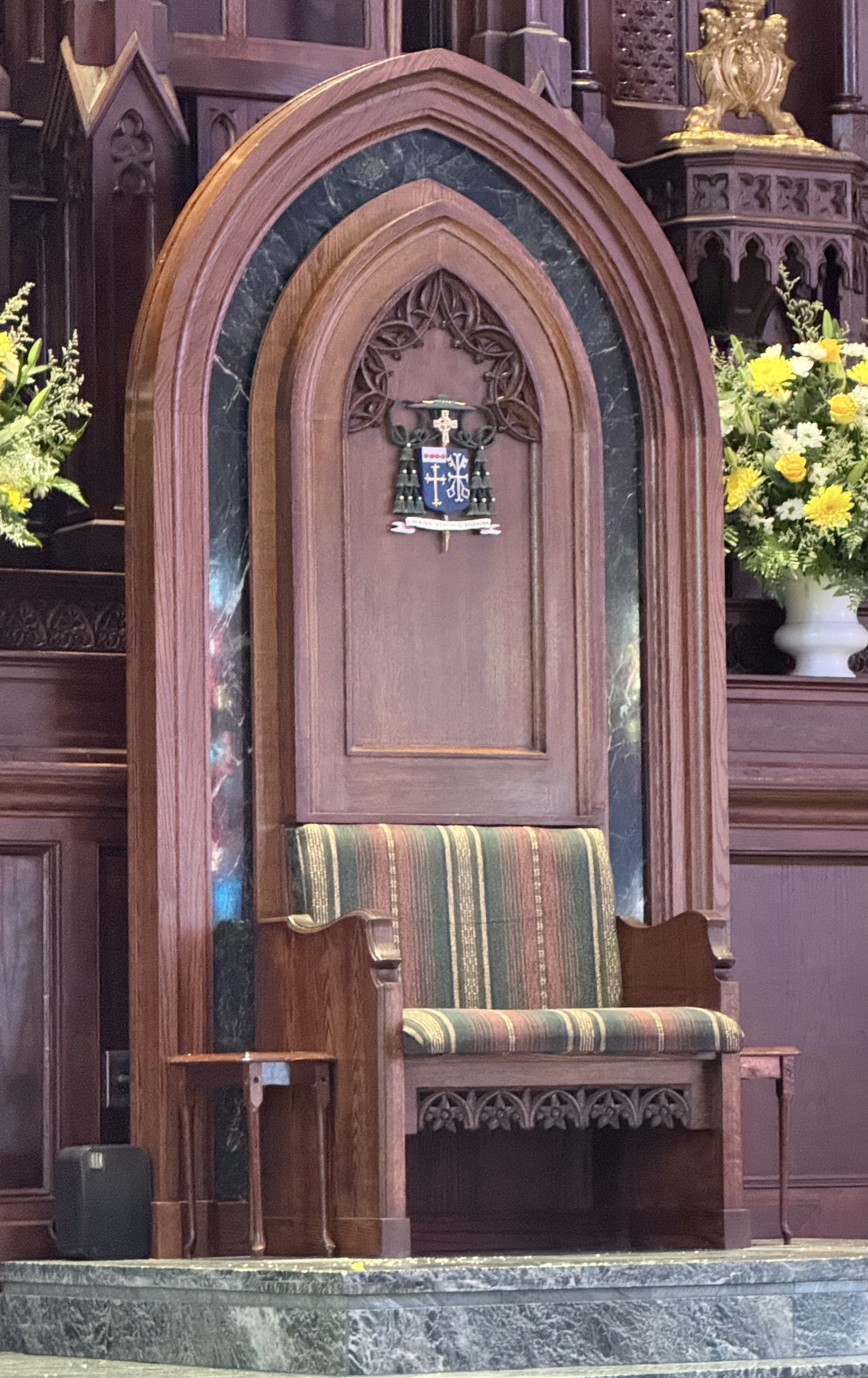
Cathedra

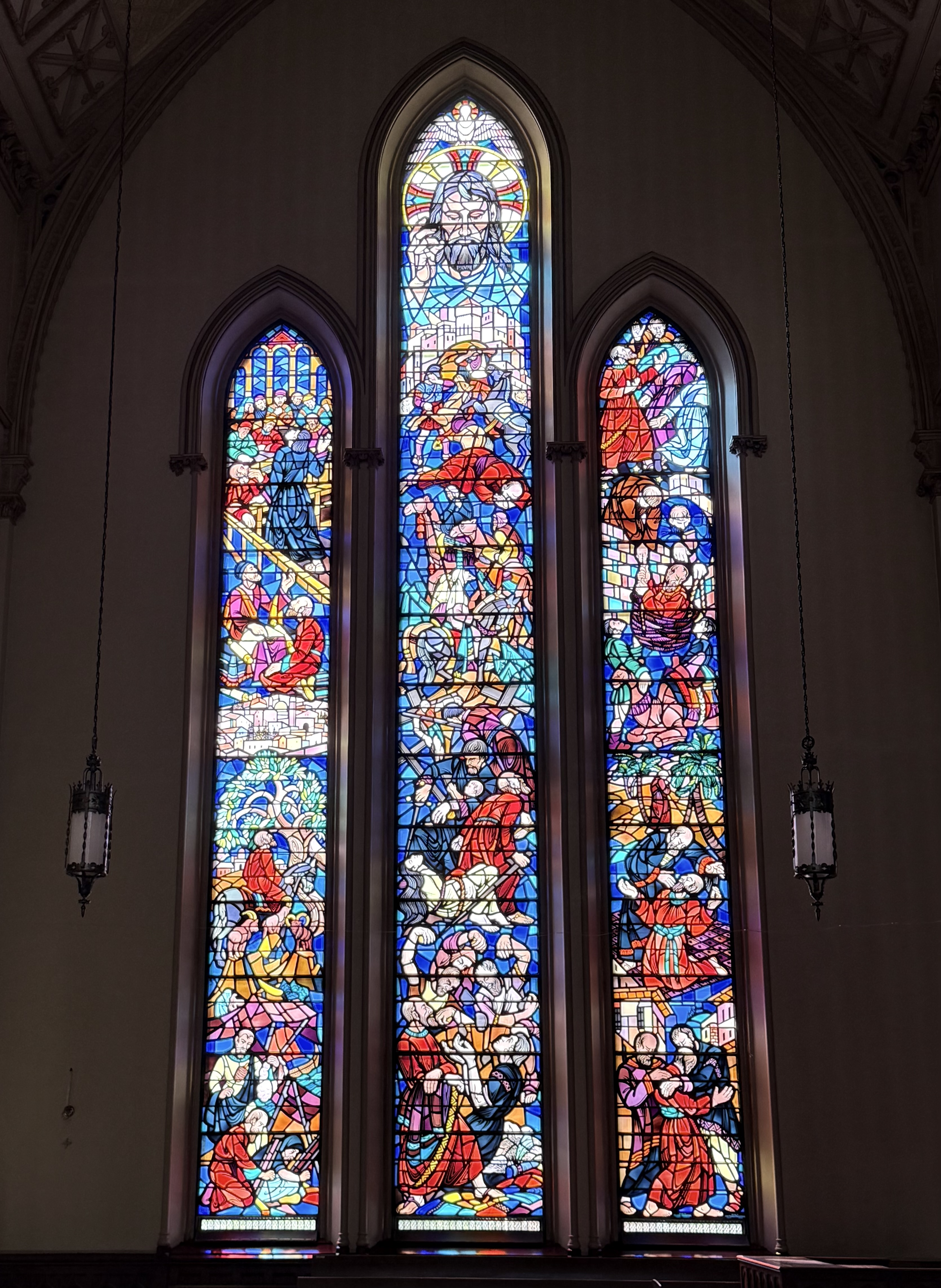
Stained glass windows

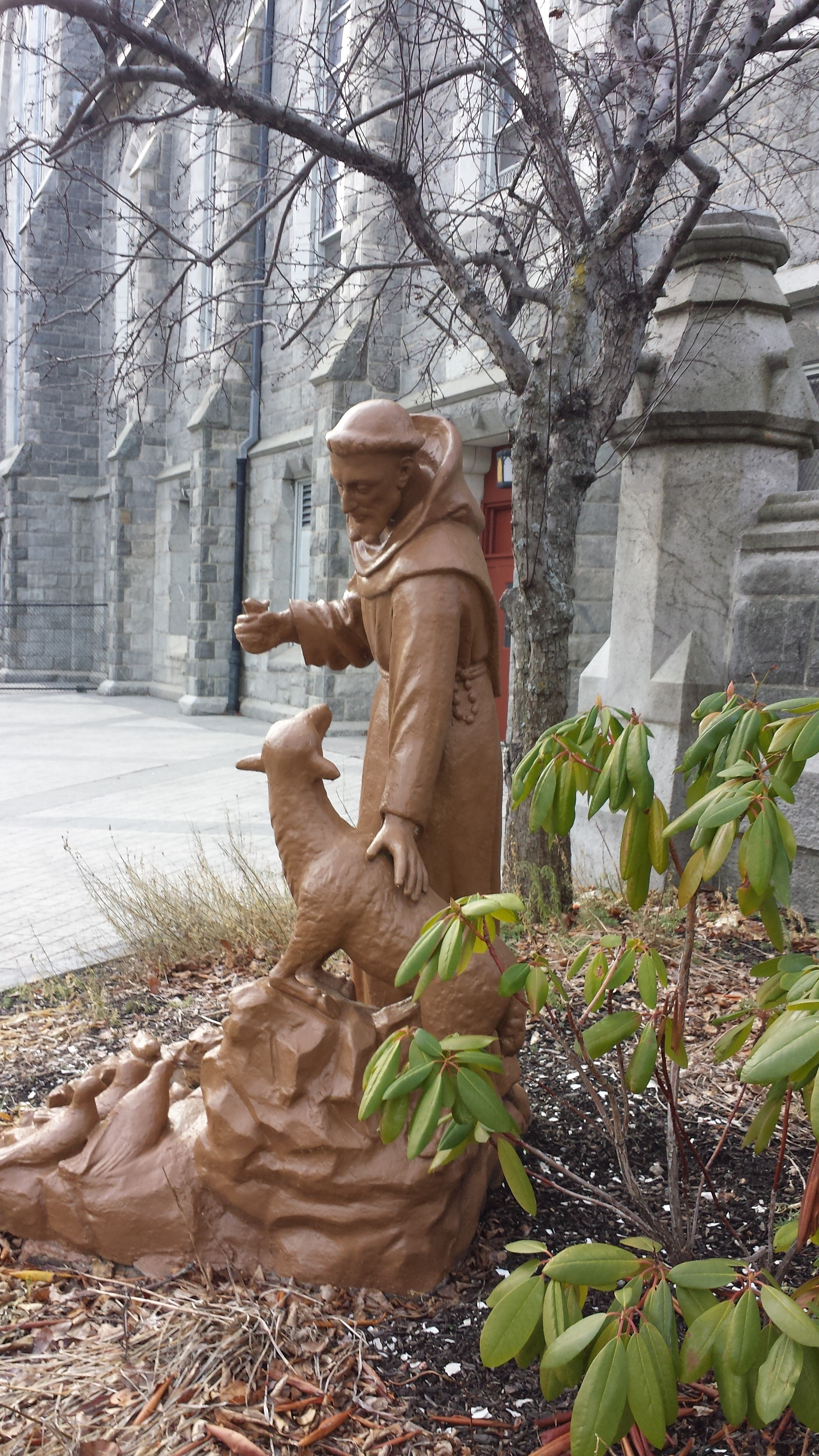
Statue of St Francis

== See also ==
- List of Catholic cathedrals in the United States
- List of cathedrals in the United States
- National Register of Historic Places listings in northwestern Worcester, Massachusetts
- National Register of Historic Places listings in Worcester County, Massachusetts
