= Magnificat Academy =

Magnificat Academy and Choir School

Location
- 1115A Worcester Road; New Braintree, (Worcester County), Massachusetts 01531; United States; 42°19′2.5″N 72°3′40″W

Information
- Type: Private, Coeducational
- Religious affiliation: Roman Catholic
- Established: 2005
- Status: Closed
- Closed: 2008
- Principal: Paul Jernberg
- Grades: 4–12
- Website: www.magnificatacademy.org

Magnificat Academy was a Catholic middle school and high school located in Warren, Massachusetts, which opened in 2005 in the Parish Hall and Rectory of St. Paul Church with 20 students. It was operated independent of the Roman Catholic Diocese of Worcester.

All students participated in the choir. The repertoire of the choir included Gregorian Chant, works of Palestrina, Bach, and Mozart as well as contemporary composers.

The school closed due to lack of finances in 2008.

== Discography ==
- Ave Maria, Recorded at St. Paul's Cathedral in Worcester, Massachusetts May 26, 2006
