= Diocese of Worcester, Massachusetts =

Latin Catholic jurisdiction in Massachusetts, US

Diocese of Worcester Diœcesis Wigorniensis

Catholic
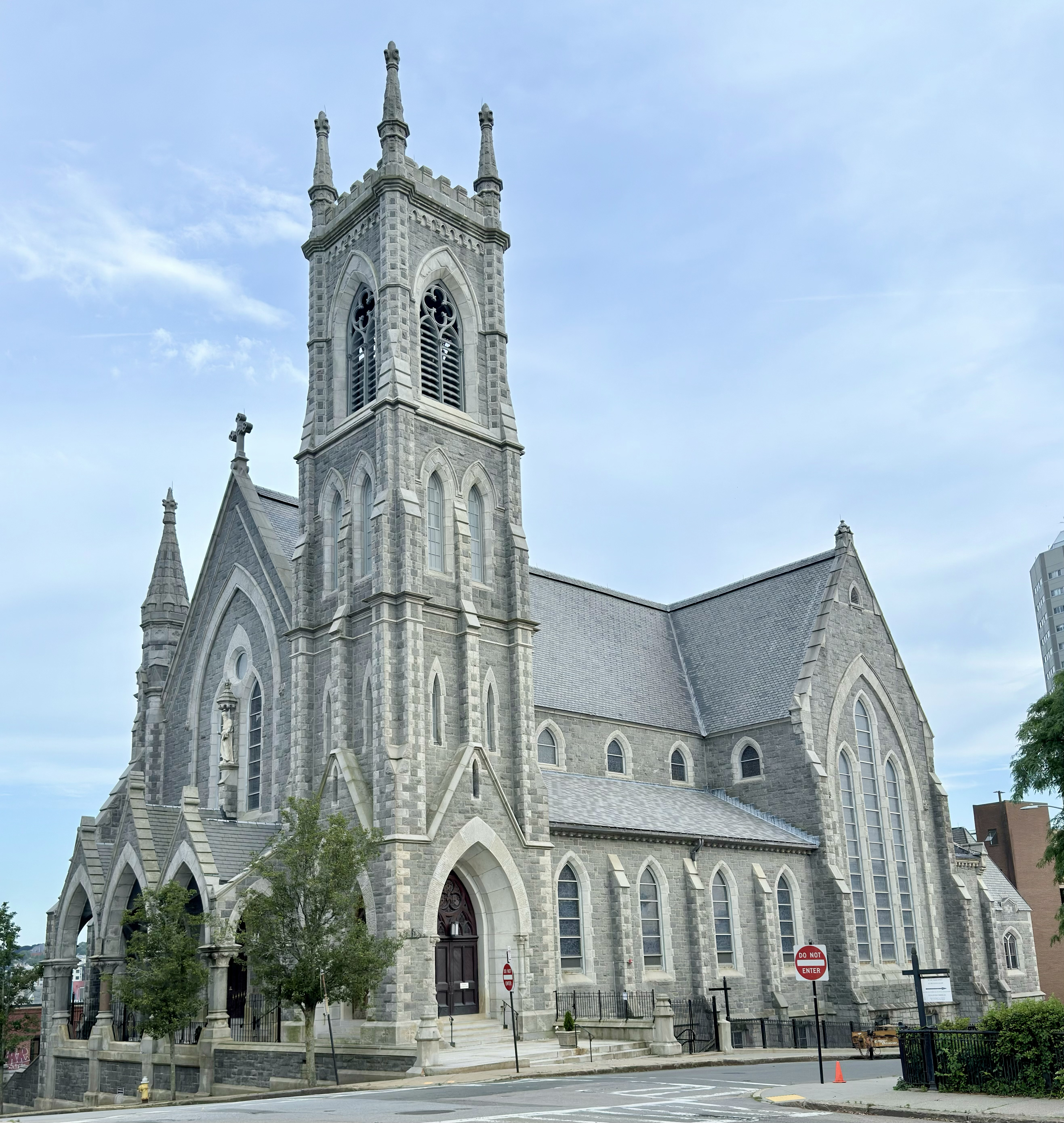
- Cathedral of St. Paul

- Coat of arms

Location
- Country: United States
- Territory: County of Worcester, Massachusetts
- Ecclesiastical province: Boston
- Coordinates: 42°15′55″N 71°48′24″W

Statistics
- Population: Total; Catholics: (as of 2023); 863,000; 294,300 (34.1%)

Information
- Denomination: Catholic Church
- Sui iuris church: Latin Church
- Rite: Roman Rite
- Established: January 14, 1950
- Cathedral: St. Paul's Cathedral
- Patron saint: St. Paul

Current leadership
- Pope: Leo XIV
- Bishop: Robert Joseph McManus
- Metropolitan Archbishop: Richard Garth Henning

Map
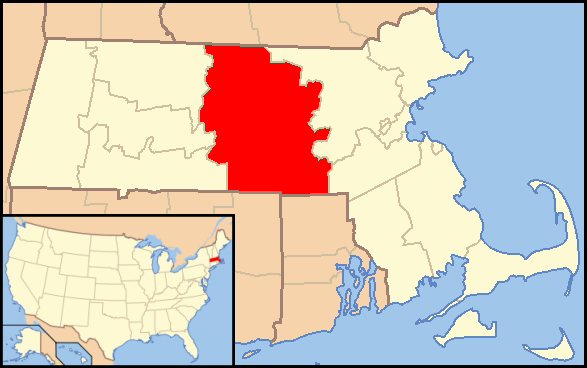

Website
- worcesterdiocese.org

The Diocese of Worcester (Latin: Diœcesis Wigorniensis) is a Latin Church ecclesiastical territory, or diocese, of the Catholic Church in central Massachusetts in the United States. The diocese consists of Worcester County. It is a suffragan diocese in the ecclesiastical province of the metropolitan Archdiocese of Boston. The patron saint of the diocese is Paul the Apostle.

The mother church of the Diocese of Worcester is the Cathedral of Saint Paul in the city of Worcester. The fifth and current bishop is Robert McManus.

== History ==
=== 1700 to 1808 ===
Before the American Revolution, the British Province of Massachusetts Bay, which included the Worcester area, had enacted laws prohibiting the practice of Catholicism in the colony. It was even illegal for a priest to reside there. To gain the support of Catholics for the Revolution, colonial leaders were forced to make concessions to them. Massachusetts enacted religious freedom for Catholics in 1780.

After the Revolution ended in 1783, Pope Pius VI want to remove American Catholics from the jurisdiction of the Diocese of London. He erected in 1784 the Prefecture Apostolic of the United States, encompassing the entire territory of the new nation. Pius VI created the Diocese of Baltimore, the first diocese in the United States, to replace the prefecture apostolic in 1789.

=== 1808 to 1950 ===
Pope Pius VII erected the Diocese of Boston in 1808 from the Diocese of Baltimore. The new diocese included all of New England in its jurisdiction. In the 1820s, Irish immigrants began arrived in Worcester County to work on the railroads and construct the Blackstone Canal. St. John's Church was established in 1834 in the City of Worcester. It is the oldest surviving Catholic church in New England outside of Boston.

The College of the Holy Cross was founded in Worcester by Bishop Benedict Fenwick of Boston in 1843. Fenwick had tried to build the college in Boston, but was thwarted by Protestant politicians running the city. He finally decided to locate it in Worcester on existing church property.

In 1870, Pope Pius IX created the Diocese of Springfield from the Diocese of Boston, including Worcester County. The Worcester area would remain part of the Diocese of Springfield for the next 80 years. The Sisters of Providence in 1893 opened St. Vincent de Paul Hospital in Worcester. Today it is St. Vincent Hospital.

In 1900, the Sisters of Sisters of Notre Dame de Namur purchased an undeveloped property on Lake Quinsigamond in Worcester to serve as a retreat center for the members of their order. Today it is Notre Dame Health Care, a skilled nursing facility, assisted living facility and palliative care center. The Augustinians of the Assumption in 1904 opened Assumption College in Worcester. Like other communities in New England, Worcester had seen a large influx of French-Canadian immigrants in the previous decades. Assumption was started to educate their boys, with classes held in French. Today it is Assumption University, open to all.In 1946, the Sisters of Saint Anne opened Anna Marie College in Worcester for women.

=== 1950 to 2004 ===
Pope Pius XII erected the Diocese of Worcester on March 7, 1950. He removed Worcester County from the Diocese of Springfield in Massachusetts to created the new diocese. Pius XII designated the Church of St. Paul as the cathedral of the new diocese and appointed Auxiliary Bishop John Wright of Boston as the first bishop.

In 1959, Pope John XXIII appointed Wright as bishop of the Diocese of Pittsburgh and named Bishop Bernard Flanagan of the Diocese of Norwich as his successor. In 1968, Reverend Timothy Harrington from the Diocese of Springfield in Massachusetts was appointed as an auxiliary bishop of the diocese by Pope Paul VI. In 1973, the diocese joined the Worcester County Ecumenical Council, a predominantly Protestant organization.

After Flannagan's retirement in 1983, Pope John Paul II appointed Harrington as the new bishop of Worcester. Harrington retired as bishop of Worcester in 1994 and John Paul II appointed Bishop Daniel Reilly from Norwich to succeed him. During his tenure in Worcester, Reilly reopened St. Joseph Parish, but merged it with Notre Dame des Canadiens Parish in Worcester. He raised over $50 million for his Forward in Faith campaign to place the diocese in a stable financial condition.

=== 2004 to present ===
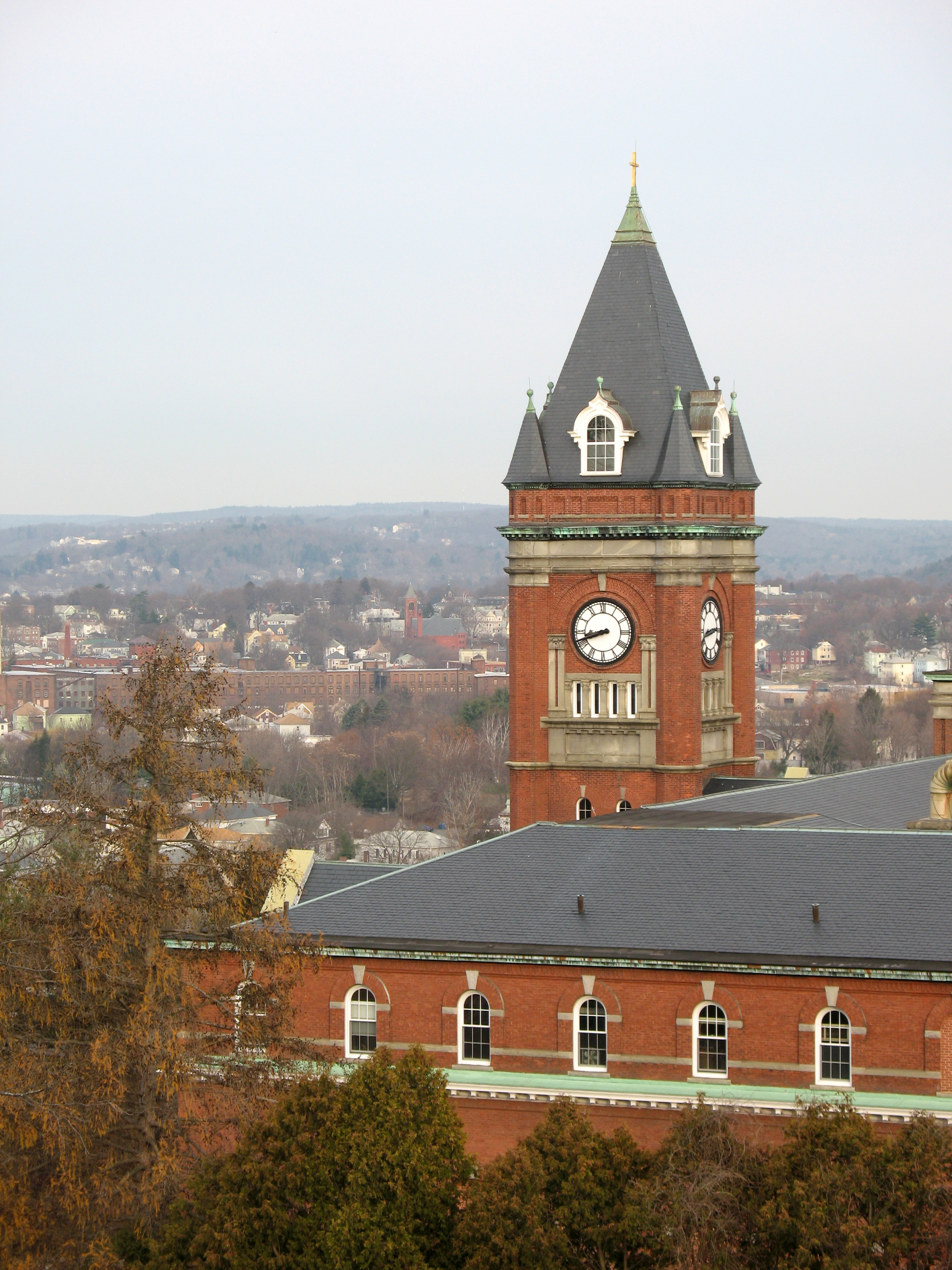
College of the Holy Cross (2006)

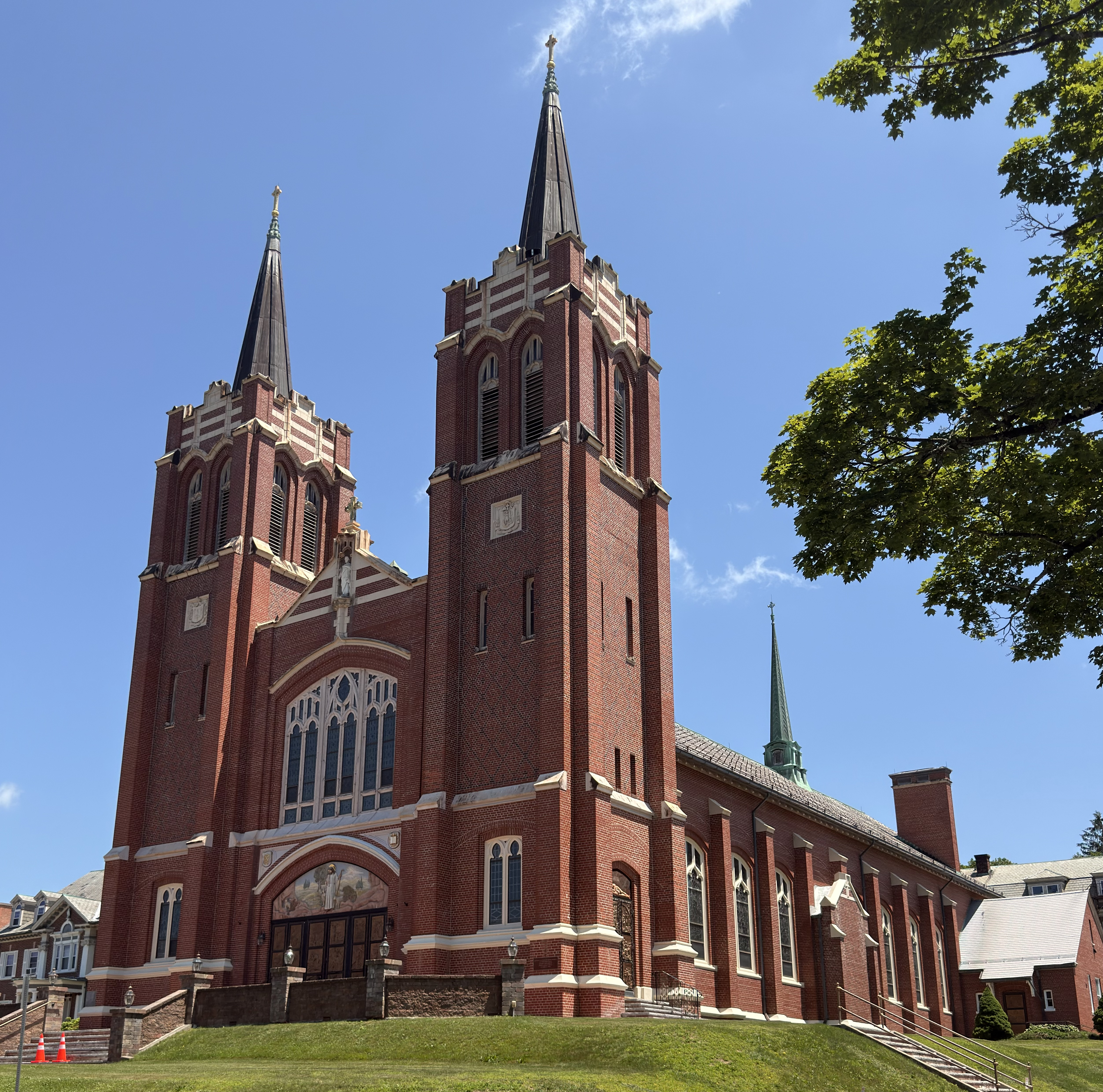
St. Joseph Basilica, Webster (2025)

When Reilly retired in 2004, John Paul II appointed Auxiliary Bishop Robert McManus from the Diocese of Providence to replace him.

McManus in 2007 criticized the College of the Holy Cross in Worcester for renting out "sacred space" to the Massachusetts Alliance on Teen Pregnancy for workshops. He said that the Alliance taught subjects that violated Catholic teachings. In October 2007, he stated that Holy Cross might lose its designation as a Catholic institution due to this action. Holy Cross President Michael C. McFarland said that the college had contractual obligations to the Alliance and would not cancel its agreement with them.

McManus was arrested in 2013 in Narragansett, Rhode Island, for drunken driving, leaving the scene of an accident, and refusing a chemical sobriety test. At 10:30 pm that evening, McManus had collided with another vehicle, then drove away from the scene. The other driver followed him and called the police. They arrested McManus 20 minutes later at his family home in Narragansett, at which point he refused the chemical sobriety test, which resulted in a loss of his driver's license for six months. McManus later pleaded guilty to refusing to take the test and was sentenced to 10 hours of community service and a $945 fine.

In 2017, in commemoration of the 100th anniversary of the three secrets of Fátima in Portugal, McManus consecrated the diocese to the Immaculate Heart of Mary. The Shrine of Mary, Mother of Persecuted Christians was opened in Clinton in 2022. The shrine was installed with help from Nasarean.org, an organization founded by Benedict Kiely that advocates for Christians facing persecution in the Middle East.

In June 2022, McManus decreed that the Jesuit Nativity School of Worcester could no longer call itself a Catholic school or celebrate mass on its premises. In March 2022, McManus had told the school to take down Black Lives Matter and Gay Pride flags from its facility; the school refused to do it. After hundreds of Holy Cross students signed a petition asking the administration to bar McManus from their commencement ceremony due to his action against Jesuit Nativity, McManus voluntarily decided not to attend. In August 2023, the two religious order operating St. John’s High School in Shrewsbury and Notre Dame Academy in Worcester wrote to McManus, saying that they would reject his policies on LGBTQ and transgender students. They stated that the existing school policies on those subjects were sufficient.

Anna Marie College announced its permaent closure in April 2026.In May 2026, McManus announced the closure of one parish and the merging of two other parishes into a third parish. He stated that the changes were necessitated by the shortage of priests, the aging of churches, and the financial resources of parishes.As of 2026, McManus is the current bishop of Worcester.

=== Sexual abuse ===
In 1995, Phil Saviano settled a lawsuit with the Diocese of Worcester, which after attorney fees amounted to $5,700. He alleged being sexually molested by David A. Holley, a pastor at St. Denis Parish in Douglas for one year during the 1970s. Two years before the legal action, in 1993, Saviano had read that Holley had been convicted of child sexual penetration of several boys in Alamogordo, New Mexico and sentenced to 275 years in prison. In August 1997, the Dallas Morning News released a 1968 letter sent by Bishop Flanagan to Jerome Hayden, a Catholic therapist in Holliston. In his letter, Flanagan stated that Holley:

"...has been ... [accused of] molesting teenage boys on at least two occasions—most recently in a hospital from which he has been barred—and with carrying around and showing to these boys pornographic magazines and books. Although the ... [accusations] were established beyond any doubt in the judgment of the priests who assisted me in the investigation as well as myself, Father has denied any wrongdoing."

In 1970, the diocese transferred Holley for treatment to the Seton Institute in Baltimore, Maryland without notifying law enforcement. After his treatment was finished, Flanagan refused to let Holley return to Worcester. Holley eventually ended up in dioceses in Texas and New Mexico.

The priest Lowe B. Dongor was indicted in September 2011 on processing child pornography and stealing money from St. Joseph’s Parish in Fitchburg to send to his family in the Philippines. After briefly fleeing to the Philippines, Dongor returned to Worcester, where he pleaded guilty and received five years of probation.

In 2013, Eran J. McManemy, one of Holley's victims in New Mexico, sued the Diocese of Worcester for allowing Holley to serve in other parts of the United States while knowing he was a pedophile. In May 2020, the Albuquerque Journal reported that the Diocese of Worcester was being sued by another Holley victim from New Mexico. The lawsuit, which named other dioceses in which Holley served, stated that the Diocese of Worcester deserved "most of the blame."

In October 2020, Bishop McManus and the diocese were named in a sexual abuse lawsuit filed by a former parishioner. The plaintiff alleged that Thomas E. Mahoney, a diocesan priest, had groomed and abused him and other boys in the early 1970s in Worcester and Boylston. The lawsuit accused the diocese of failing to stop Mahoney's alleged crimes. After the lawsuit was filed, McManus suspended Mahoney, already retired, from any ministerial duties.

In December 2022, Nicole Bell sued the diocese, claiming that she and other women had been sexually abused by William Riley, the Food for the Poor coordinator at St. John’s Parish. She said that in the early 2010's Riley would coerce her into having sex with him. Bell accused the diocese and the pastor of St. John's of covering up for Riley. The diocese suspended Riley after receiving the complaint and he quit soon after that.

The diocese in February 2023 release a list of 173 credible accusations of sexual abuse against clergy in the diocese. The list did not include the names of accused clergy.

== Bishops ==
=== Bishops of Worcester ===
1. John Joseph Wright (1950-1959), appointed Bishop of Pittsburgh and later Prefect of the Congregation for the Clergy (elevated to Cardinal in 1969)
2. Bernard Joseph Flanagan (1959-1983)
3. Timothy Joseph Harrington (1983-1994)
4. Daniel Patrick Reilly (1994-2004)
5. Robert Joseph McManus (2004–present)

=== Auxiliary bishops ===
- Timothy Joseph Harrington (1968-1983), appointed Bishop of Worcester
- George Edward Rueger (1987-2005)

=== Other diocesan priest who became bishop ===
Michael Wallace Banach, appointed Apostolic Nuncio and Titular Archbishop in 2013

== Organization of parishes ==
In 2004, Bishop Reilly grouped parishes into "clusters". The purpose of this system is to allow communities to come together for regional events. Also, priests may substitute for one another at a particular parish.

Parish	City/Town	Pastor/Administrator	Associate Pastor/Vicar
Annunciation Parish	Gardner	Victor Sierra	Thiago Ibiapina
St. John Paul II	Southbridge	Carlos Ardilla	Peter Bui
Blessed Sacrament	Worcester	Thomas Landry	
Christ the King	Worcester	Thomas J. Sullivan	
Divine Mercy	Blackstone	John Larochelle	
Holy Cross	Templeton (East Templeton)	Patrick Ssekyole	
Saint Joseph - Saint Stephen	Worcester	Robert K. Johnson	Cleber dePaula
Holy Family of Nazareth	Leominster	José A. Rodriguez	
Holy Trinity	Harvard/Bolton	Terence T. Kilcoyne	
Immaculate Conception	Lancaster	Thomas H. Hultquist	
Immaculate Conception	Worcester	Edwin Montaña	
Immaculate Heart of Mary	Winchendon	Henry Ramirez	
Mary, Queen of the Rosary	Spencer	William Schipper	
North American Martyrs	Auburn	Frederick Fraini, III	
Our Lady Immaculate	Athol	Thien Nguyen	
Our Lady of Częstochowa	Worcester	Ryszard Polek	Edward Michalski
Our Lady of Good Counsel	West Boylston	Steven M. Labaire	
Our Lady of Hope	Grafton	Anthony Mpagi	Derek Mobilio
Our Lady of Mount Carmel And Our Lady of Loreto Parish	Worcester	F. Stephen Pedone	
Our Lady of Lourdes	Worcester	James B. O'Shea	
Our Lady of Mercy (Maronite Eparchy of Brooklyn)	Worcester	Alex Joseph	
Our Lady of Perpetual Help (Melkite Eparchy of Newton)	Worcester	Bryan McNeil	
Our Lady of Providence	Worcester	Jonathan Slavinskas	
Our Lady of the Angels	Worcester	Mark Rainville	
Our Lady of the Assumption	Millbury	Daniel R. Mulcahy Jr.	
Our Lady of the Lake	Leominster	Kenneth Cardinale	
Our Lady of the Rosary	Worcester	Patrick J. Hawthorne	
Our Lady of Vilna (historically Lithuanian, currently Vietnamese)	Worcester	Peter Tam M. Bui	
Prince of Peace	Princeton	James J. Caldarella	
Sacred Heart of Jesus	Hopedale	William C. Konicki	
Sacred Heart of Jesus	Milford	Richard A. Scioli	Gregory J. Hoppough (weekends)
Sacred Heart of Jesus	Webster	Adam Reid	
Sacred Heart-St. Catherine of Sweden	Worcester	Erik Asante	
St. Aloysius	Gilbertville	Richard A. Lembo	
St. Aloysius-St. Jude	Leicester	John M. Lizewiski	
St. Andrew Bobola (Polish)	Dudley	Krzysztof Korcz	
St. Andrew the Apostle	Worcester	Francis J. Scollen	
St. Ann - Closed, Merged with St. Roch in Oxford 2025	Oxford (North Oxford)	James Boulette	David Cotter
St. Anna	Leominster	Carlos Ruiz	
St. Anne	Shrewsbury	Walter Riley	Paul T. O'Connell (Senior Priest)
St. Anne	Southborough	Albert Irudayasamy	
St. Anne & St. Patrick (run by Assumptionists)	Sturbridge (Fiskedale)	Luc Martell	
St. Anthony of Padua	Fitchburg	Juan Ramirez	
St. Anthony of Padua	Dudley	Daniel Moreno	
St. Augustine Mission	Hardwick (Wheelwright)	Richard A. Lembo	
St. Bernadette	Northborough	Ronald G. Falco	
St. Bernard @ St. Camillus de Lellis Church	Fitchburg	Joseph M. Dolan	
St. Boniface	Lunenburg	Charles Omolo	
St. Brigid	Millbury	Daniel R. Mulcahy Jr.	
St. Cecilia	Leominster	James Moroney	Paul Shaughnessy, S.J.
St. Christopher	Worcester	Stanley F. Krutcik	
St. Columba	Paxton	Stephen Lundrigan	
St. Denis	Ashburnham	Andres Araque	
St. Denis	Douglas	Miguel Pagan	
St. Edward the Confessor	Westminster	Juan Herrara	
St. Francis of Assisi	Athol	Thien Nguyen	
St. Francis of Assisi (Hispanic)	Fitchburg	Angel Matos	
St. Francis of Assisi	South Barre	James B. Callahan	
St. Gabriel the Archangel	Upton	Laurence V. Brault	Lucas LaRoche
St. George	Worcester	Edward D. Niccolls	
St. Joan of Arc (Hispanic)	Worcester	Enoch Kyeremateng	
St. John	Worcester	John F. Madden	Jean Robert Simbert Brice
St. John the Baptist	East Brookfield	Joe Rice	Donald C. Ouellette
St. John, Guardian of Our Lady	Clinton	James S. Mazzone	Julio Granados
St. Joseph	Auburn	Paul M. Bomba	
St. Joseph	Charlton	Robert A. Grattaroti	Charles Monroe
St. Joseph	Fitchburg	Dario Acevedo	
St. Joseph & St. Pius X	Leicester	Robert A. Loftus	
St. Joseph	North Brookfield	Joe Rice	Donald C. Ouellette
St. Joseph Basilica	Webster	Grzegorz Chodkowski	
St. Joseph the Good Provider	Berlin	Thomas Tokarz	
St. Leo	Leominster	William E. Champlin	
St. Louis	Webster	Javier Julio	
St. Luke the Evangelist	Westborough	Diego A. Buritica	V. Sagar Gundiga
St. Mark	Sutton	Michael A. Digeronimo	
St. Martin Mission	Templeton (Otter River)	Patrick Ssekyole	
St. Mary	Holden (Jefferson)	Timothy M. Brewer	
St. Mary	Shrewsbury	Michael F. Rose	José Carvajal
St. Mary	Uxbridge	Nicholas Desimone	Michael Hoye
St. Mary of the Hills	Boylston	Juan Echavarria	
St. Mary of the Assumption	Milford	Peter Joyce	Adriano Lessa Natalino
St. Matthew	Southborough	James B. Flynn	
St. Patrick	Rutland	James Boland	
St. Patrick	Whitinsville	Tomasz J. Borkowski	
St. Paul Cathedral	Worcester	Hugo Cano	Juan Parra
St. Peter	Northbridge	Michael Lavallee	
St. Peter	Petersham	Thien Nguyen	
St. Peter (Hispanic and African-American)	Worcester	Francis J. Scollen	
St. Richard of Chichester	Sterling	James M. Steuterman	
St. Roch	Oxford	James Boulette	
St. Rose of Lima	Northborough	Juan Escudero	
St. Stanislaus	Warren	Richard Reidy	
St. Vincent de Paul	Templeton (Baldwinville)	Francis A. Roberge	

== Education ==
As of 2026, the Diocese of Worcester has six high schools and 16 middle and elementary schools.

=== High schools ===
- Immaculate Heart of Mary* – Harvard (grades 1 to 12)
- Notre Dame Academy – Worcester
- St. Bernard's High School – Fitchburg
- St. John's High School – Shrewsbury
- St Paul Diocesan Jr/Sr High School – Worcester
- Trivium School* – Lancaster

* Operates independently of the diocese

=== Closed schools ===
- Holy Name Central Catholic High School – Worcester
- Magnificat Academy – Warren
- Notre Dame Preparatory School – Fitchburg
- Saint Peter-Marian High School – Worcester
- St. Mary's Central Catholic High School – Worcester

== Administrators ==
- Robert McManus, bishop
- Daniel P. Reilly, bishop emeritus
- Thomas Sullivan, vicar general
- John Larochelle, episcopal vicar of finance
- F. Stephen Pedone, judicial vicar
- Paul T. O'Connell, associate judicial vicar
- Raymond L. Delisle, chancellor of operations
- James Mazzone, director of priest personnel
- Paula Kelleher, vicar for religious
- James P. Moroney, diocesan office of liturgy
- Donato Infante III, director of vocations

== See also ==
- Ecclesiastical Province of Boston
