= Robert Francis Joyce =

American Catholic prelate (born 1896–1990)

His Excellency, The Most Reverend Robert Francis Joyce
- Bishop of Burlington; Titular Bishop of Citium
- Church: Catholic
- Diocese: Burlington
- In office: 1957—1971
- Predecessor: Edward Francis Ryan
- Successor: John Aloysius Marshall
- Previous post: Auxiliary Bishop of Burlington (1954‍–‍1957)

Orders
- Ordination: May 26, 1923 by Joseph John Rice
- Consecration: October 28, 1954 by Edward Francis Ryan

Personal details
- Born: October 7, 1896 Proctor, Vermont, US
- Died: September 2, 1990 (aged 93) Burlington, Vermont, US
- Education: University of Vermont; Grand Seminary of Montreal
- Motto: Ut vitam habeant (Latin for 'That they may have life')

Robert Francis Joyce (October 7, 1896—September 2, 1990) was an American prelate of the Catholic Church. He served as bishop of the Diocese of Burlington in Vermont from 1956 to 1971.

== Biography ==
=== Early life ===
Robert Joyce was born on October 7, 1896, in Proctor, Vermont, to Patrick Joseph and Ellen (née Connor) Joyce. After graduating from Proctor High School, he studied at the University of Vermont in Burlington, Vermont, and the Grand Seminary of Montreal in Montreal, Quebec.

=== Priesthood ===
Joyce was ordained to the priesthood in Burlington for the Diocese of Burlington by Bishop Joseph John Rice in Burlington on May 26, 1923. Joyce then did pastoral work in the diocese until 1927, when he was appointed principal of the Cathedral High School in South Burlington, Vermont. He resumed his pastoral ministry in 1932.

After the American entry into World War II in December 1941, Joyce enlisted in the US Army Chaplain Corps in 1943. After the end of the war, he was discharged from the Army in 1946. He later served as a pro-synodal judge and diocesan director of the diocesan Holy Name Society.

=== Auxiliary Bishop and Bishop of Burlington ===
On July 8, 1954, Joyce was appointed auxiliary bishop of Burlington and titular bishop of Citium by Pope Pius XII. He received his episcopal consecration at the Cathedral of the Immaculate Conception in Burlington on October 28, 1954, from Bishop Edward Ryan, with Bishops Matthew Brady and Bernard Flanagan serving as co-consecrators.

After the death of Bishop Ryan, Pius XII named Joyce as the sixth bishop of Burlington on December 29, 1956. He was installed on February 26, 1957. Joyce attended the Second Vatican Council in Rome from 1962 to 1965, and served on the national board of the American Cancer Society for ten years. Joyce was the first clergyman elected as a trustee at the University of Vermont in Burlington.

=== Retirement and death ===
On December 14, 1971, Pope Paul VI accepted Joyce's resignation as bishop of Burlington. Robert Joyce died in Burlington on September 2, 1990, at age 93. He was buried at Resurrection Park Cemetery in South Burlington, Vermont.

== Legacy ==
In 1979, the University of Vermont established the Bishop Robert f. Joyce Distinguished Professorship in Gerontology.

Catholic Church titles
Preceded by Edward Francis Ryan	Bishop of Burlington; 1957—1971	Succeeded by John Aloysius Marshall
