= Edward Francis Ryan =

American Catholic prelate (1879–1956)

His Excellency, The Most Reverend Edward Francis Ryan
- Bishop of Burlington
- Church: Catholic
- Diocese: Burlington
- In office: 1945–1956
- Predecessor: Matthew Francis Brady
- Successor: Robert Francis Joyce

Orders
- Ordination: August 10, 1905 by Giuseppe Ceppetelli
- Consecration: January 3, 1945 by Richard James Cushing, Francis Joseph Spellman, and Francis Patrick Keough

Personal details
- Born: March 10, 1879 Lynn, Massachusetts, U.S.
- Died: November 3, 1956 (aged 77) Burlington, Vermont, U.S.
- Education: Boston College; Pontifical North American College
- Motto: Magnum nomen Domini (Latin for 'Great is our Lord's name')
- Coat of arms: Edward Francis Ryan's coat of arms

Edward Francis Ryan (March 10, 1879 – November 3, 1956) was an American prelate of the Catholic Church. He served as bishop of the diocese of Burlington in Vermont from 1945 until his death in 1956.

== Biography ==
=== Early life ===
Edward Ryan was born on March 10, 1879, in Lynn, Massachusetts, to Simon Joseph and Mary (née Breen) Ryan. After graduating from Ingalls Grammar School in Lynn, he attended Lynn Classical High School and Boston College in Boston, where he was editor-in-chief of The Stylus. He furthered his studies at the Pontifical North American College in Rome.

=== Priesthood ===
Ryan was ordained to the priesthood in Rome for the Archdiocese of Boston by Archbishop Giuseppe Ceppetelli on August 10, 1905. He said his first mass at the Basilica of San Clemente al Laterano in Rome. He earned a doctorate in theology from the Pontifical Urban College for the Propagation of the Faith in Rome.

After finishing in Rome, the archdiocese assigned Ryan to pastoral work in the archdiocese. After the American entry into World War I in 1917, Ryan was commissioned as a first lieutenant in the US Army Chaplain Corps. He served with the 89th Infantry Division during the 1918 Meuse–Argonne offensive in Belgium and France.

On his return to Massachusetts at the end of the war, Ryan served as curate in two parishes before becoming the pastor of Our Lady, Help of Christians Parish in Concord, Massachusetts. He became pastor of Holy Name Parish in the West Roxbury neighborhood of Boston in 1932. Our Lady of Perpetual Help in Roxbury was a mission station of Holy Name. Ryan started construction of an enlarged church in 1937, which was completed in March 1939. He also instituted the practice of a number of novenas. He served as state chaplain for the Catholic Daughters of America.

=== Bishop of Burlington ===
On November 11, 1944, Ryan was appointed the fifth bishop of Burlington by Pope Pius XII. He received his episcopal consecration on January 3, 1945, at the Cathedral of the Holy Cross in Boston from Archbishop Richard Cushing, with Archbishop Francis Spellman and Bishop Francis Keough serving as co-consecrators. He was installed at the Cathedral of the Immaculate Conception in Burlington on February 7, 1945.

During his 11-year-long tenure as bishop, Ryan established the Charterhouse of Our Lady of Bethlehem, the only Carthusian monastery in the United States, in Whitingham, Vermont, in 1951. He also established the Benedictine Priory at Weston, Vermont in 1953, and the College of St. Joseph at Rutland, Vermont, in 1954. He erected almost two dozen new churches, established the Vermont Catholic Tribune in 1956, and provided a camp and a school for boys in Burlington.

=== Death ===
Edward Ryan died in Burlington on November 3, 1956, at age 77. He is buried at Resurrection Park Cemetery in South Burlington, Vermont.

Catholic Church titles
Preceded by Matthew Francis Brady	Bishop of Burlington; 1945–1956	Succeeded by Robert Francis Joyce
