= Bernard Joseph Flanagan =

American prelate

His Excellency, The Most Reverend Bernard Joseph Flanagan
- Bishop of Worcester
- Church: Roman Catholic
- See: Diocese of Worcester
- Appointed: August 8, 1959
- Installed: September 24, 1959
- Term ended: March 31, 1983
- Predecessor: John Joseph Wright
- Successor: Timothy Joseph Harrington
- Previous post: Bishop of Norwich

Orders
- Ordination: December 8, 1931 by Francesco Marchetti Selvaggiani
- Consecration: November 30, 1953 by Edward Francis Ryan, Vincent Stanislaus Waters, and John Patrick Cody

Personal details
- Born: March 31, 1908 Proctor, Vermont, US
- Died: January 28, 1998 (aged 89) Worcester, Massachusetts, US
- Buried: St. John Cemetery, Worcester
- Education: College of the Holy Cross; Pontifical North American College; Catholic University of America
- Motto: Respice ad Mariam (Look to Mary)

Styles of Vincent Joseph Hines
- Reference style: His Excellency; The Most Reverend
- Spoken style: Your Excellency
- Religious style: Bishop

Bernard Joseph Flanagan (March 31, 1908 – January 28, 1998) was an American prelate of the Roman Catholic Church. He served as bishop of the Diocese of Norwich in Connecticut (1953–1959) and as bishop of the Diocese of Worcester in Massachusetts (1959–1983).

== Biography ==
=== Early life ===
Bernard Flanagan was born on March 31, 1908, in Proctor, Vermont, to John B. and Alice (née McGarry) Flanagan. He studied at the College of the Holy Cross in Worcester, Massachusetts, and at the Pontifical North American College in Rome.

=== Priesthood ===
Flanagan was ordained to the priesthood in Rome for the Diocese of Burlington by Cardinal Francesco Selvaggiani on December 8, 1931. He earned a doctorate in canon law from the Catholic University of America in Washington, D.C., in 1943. Flanagan then served as secretary to Bishop Edward Ryan and as chancellor of the diocese.

=== Bishop of Norwich ===
On September 1, 1953, Flanagan was appointed the first bishop of Norwich by Pope Pius XII. Flanagan received his episcopal consecration on December 3, 1953, in the Cathedral of the Immaculate Conception in Burlington, Vermont, from Bishop Edward Ryan, with Bishops Vincent Waters and John Cody serving as co-consecrators. He was installed on December 8, in St. Patrick's Cathedral in Norwich. During his tenure, Flanagan oversaw the establishment of several secondary schools and parishes within his diocese.

=== Bishop of Worcester ===
Flanagan was named the second bishop of Worcester on August 8, 1959, by Pope John XXIII. Flanagan was installed by Cardinal Richard Cushing on September 24, 1959. Flanagan attended the Second Vatican Council in Rome from 1962 to 1965, and was an ardent supporter of ecumenism. He once declared,

"There are many paths that we can and must travel, as we work and pray for the fulfillment of Christ's prayer that 'all be one'. One of these paths is the association of yet separated Christian churches in local and regional councils."

In 1973, the diocese joined the Worcester County Ecumenical Council, a predominantly Protestant organization. Flanagan also engaged in active dialogue with Archbishop Iakovos of the Greek Orthodox Church in America.

=== Retirement ===
Pope John Paul II accepted Flanagan's resignation as bishop of Worcester on March 31, 1983. Bernard Flanagan died on January 28, 1998, in Worcester at age 89.

== See also ==
- Catholic Church hierarchy
- Catholic Church in the United States
- Historical list of the Catholic bishops of the United States
- List of Catholic bishops of the United States
- Lists of patriarchs, archbishops, and bishops

Catholic Church titles
Preceded by none	Bishop of Norwich; 1953–1959	Succeeded by Vincent Joseph Hines
Preceded by John Joseph Wright	Bishop of Worcester; 1959–1983	Succeeded by Timothy Joseph Harrington
