= John Wright (cardinal) =

American cardinal of the Roman Catholic Church (1909–1979)

His Eminence John Joseph Wright
- Prefect of the Congregation for the Clergy
- See: Pittsburgh
- Installed: April 23, 1969
- Term ended: August 10, 1979
- Predecessor: Jean-Marie Villot
- Successor: Silvio Oddi
- Other posts: Bishop of Pittsburgh (1959 to 1969); Bishop of Worcester (1950 to 1959)

Orders
- Ordination: December 8, 1935 by Francesco Marchetti-Selvaggiani
- Consecration: May 10, 1947 by Richard Cushing
- Created cardinal: April 28, 1969 by Paul VI

Personal details
- Born: July 18, 1909 Dorchester, Massachusetts, US
- Died: August 10, 1979 (aged 70) Cambridge, Massachusetts, US
- Motto: Resonare Christum (Echoing Christ)

Styles of John Joseph Wright
- Reference style: His Eminence
- Spoken style: Your Eminence
- Informal style: Cardinal
- See: Pittsburgh (emeritus)

John Joseph Wright (July 18, 1909 – August 10, 1979) was an American Catholic prelate who served as prefect of the Congregation for the Clergy from 1969 until his death. He was elevated to the cardinalate in 1969.

Wright previously served as bishop of Pittsburgh in Pennsylvania from 1959 to 1969, as bishop of Worcester in Massachusetts from 1950 to 1959 and as an auxiliary bishop of the Archdiocese of Boston in Massachusetts from 1947 to 1950.

== Biography ==
=== Early life ===
John Joseph Wright was born on July 18, 1909, in Dorchester, Massachusetts, to John and Harriet (née Cokely) Wright. As a child, he listened to World War I veterans talking about their service in France, creating a fascination with that nation. While attending Boston Latin School, he worked at the Hyde Park branch of the Boston Public Library as stack boy in the evenings and summers. He also financed his studies by working for The Boston Post.

Wright graduated from Boston College in 1931, and then entered St. John's Seminary in Boston. At the end of his first year at St. John's, the archdiocese sent him to Rome to reside at the Pontifical North American College while studying at the Pontifical Gregorian University. While in Europe, he took unpaid parish work in Scotland, England and France, While in France, he took a parish in the Dordogne Department, learning the folk songs and poetr of that region.

=== Priesthood ===
Wright was ordained to the priesthood for the Archdiocese of Boston by Cardinal Francesco Marchetti Selvaggiani on December 8, 1935, in the chapel of the North American College. After his ordination, Wright continued graduate work at the Gregorian, earning his Licentiate of Sacred Theology in 1936 and his Doctorate of Sacred Theology in 1939.

After returning to Boston, Wright taught philosophy and theology at St. John's Seminary. In 1943, he was appointed private secretary to Cardinal William Henry O'Connell. Wright continued in this position under O'Connell's successor, Archbishop Richard Cushing. The Vatican raised Wright to the rank of monsignor on December 17, 1944.

=== Auxiliary Bishop of Boston ===
On May 10, 1947, Pope Pius XII appointed Wright as auxiliary bishop of Boston and titular bishop of Aegeae. Wright received his episcopal consecration on June 30. 1947, from Cushing, with Bishops Ralph Hayes and James Connelly serving as co-consecrators, in the Cathedral of the Holy Cross in Boston.

Wright participated in the 1948 National Pilgrimage to Lourdes and Rome by American Catholics. While in France, he was awarded the Legion of Honour by French Foreign Minister Robert Schuman.

=== Bishop of Worcester ===
Coat of arms as bishop of Worcester

Pius XII appointed Wright as the first bishop of Worcester on January 28, 1950. In this position, he criticized both Utopians and doom-sayers. Quoting Cardinal Maurice Feltin of Paris, Wright said that an exemplary Christian recognizes "...the vast errors of which human nature is capable... but [knows] that grace is stronger than sin". A member of the Mariological Society of America, he hosted the society's 1950 convention in Worcester, Massachusetts.

=== Bishop of Pittsburgh ===
Coat of arms as bishop of Pittsburgh

Wright was appointed by Pope John XXIII as the eighth bishop of Pittsburgh on January 23, 1959. In 1961, Wright opened the Bishop's Latin School in Pittsburgh as the pre-seminary high school for the diocese. It closed in 1973. Wright attended the Second Vatican Council in Rome from 1963 to 1965, acting as a decisive force behind several of its documents. Following the Council's advancements in ecumenism, he believed that an "immediate unity in good works and charity" would arise between Catholics and Protestants.

Wright promoted music and culture during his time in Pittsburgh. He befriended the African-American composer Mary Lou Williams, commissioning her to perform a jazz mass at a local Catholic school. He also helped her to establish the Pittsburgh Jazz Festival in 1964.

=== Congregation for the Clergy ===
Pope Paul VI on April 23, 1969, appointed Wright as the prefect of the Congregation for the Clergy. This made him the highest-ranking American in the Roman Curia.

=== Cardinal ===
Wright was created cardinal priest of Gesù Divin Maestro alla Pineta Sacchetti Church in Rome by Paul VI in the consistory of April 28, 1969. Wright was one of the four cardinals who travelled to the Auschwitz concentration camp in Poland in 1972 for a memorial of Reverend Maximilian Kolbe, who was killed there. Besides Cardinal John Krol, Wright was the only other American cardinal to visit Poland.

Due to his recovery from surgery, Wright did not go to Rome to act as a cardinal elector in the August 1978 conclave that elected Pope John Paul I. After the conclave, Wright remarked that John Paul I would be "...a witty Pontiff who delights in combining love of literature with love of the words of God." However, John Paul I died unexpectedly in September 1978. Wright then attended the October 1978 conclave in Rome that selected Pope John Paul II.

=== Death ===
Wright died on August 10, 1979, from polymyositis in Cambridge, Massachusetts, at age 70. He is buried in Holyhood Cemetery in Brookline, Massachusetts.

== Views ==
He was an intellectual who was liberal on social issues, but conservative in theology. He espoused civil rights and condemned the Vietnam War, but opposed ordination of women and birth control. He believed that annual Synods of Bishops would be useless and burdenful, and that seven years was the appropriate age for children to receive the Sacrament of Penance, as it might be thus able to correct sinful behavior at an early age.

== Legacy ==
John Paul II, five days after Wright's death, pointed to his life as "an existence which was spent totally for Christ and his Church". He also stated that Wright was

"...always faithful to his motto: Resonare Christum corde Romano (Echo Christ with a Roman heart) ... that really sums up his whole life, as he had a 'sensus Ecclesiae' which was second nature to him".

Archbishop Alberto Bovone, who worked as the undersecretary of Wright, wrote of the characteristic features of his personality: strong, exuberant joviality, who gave wise and humorous contributions during meetings; saw himself as the Pope's soldier, with a combatant's temperament; an ardent and indefatigable worker, who was reluctant to rest when involved in a project; generous towards his friends and co-workers, giving them gifts as tokens of affection; love for the faith that led him to correct theological errors of the media and to be upset at theologians who superimposed their opinion over sacred doctrine, while being indulgent towards persons who admitted their mistakes.

In 1998, Wright's name was given to Cardinal Wright Elementary School in Pittsburgh. The school closed in 2011.

The John Cardinal Wright Award is given by the Diocese of Pittsburgh to individuals who have made a significant contribution in fulfilling the mission of the church through working with youth and young adults.

Catholic Church titles
Preceded by none	Bishop of Worcester; 1950–1959	Succeeded by Bernard Flanagan
Preceded by John Dearden	Bishop of Pittsburgh; 1959–1969	Succeeded by Vincent Leonard
Preceded by Jean-Marie Villot	Prefect of the Congregation for the Clergy; 1969–1979	Succeeded by Silvio Oddi
