= St. Adalbert's Church =

St. Adalbert's Church may refer to:

== Belarus ==
- Church of St. Adalbert and Benedictine monastery, Minsk

== Czechia ==
- Church of Saint Adalbert, Dvory nad Žitavou
- Cathedral of Saints Vitus, Wenceslaus and Adalbert, Prague

== Germany ==
https://de.wikipedia.org/wiki/St._Adalbert_(Aachen)

== Hungary ==
- Esztergom Basilica, Primatial Basilica of the Blessed Virgin Mary Assumed Into Heaven and St Adalbert

== Poland ==
- Gniezno Cathedral, The Cathedral Basilica of the Assumption of the Blessed Virgin Mary and St. Adalbert
- Church of Saint Adalbert, Bydgoszcz
- Church of St. Adalbert, Kraków
- Church of St. Adalbert, Poznań
- St. Adalbert's Church in Kielce

== Russia ==
- Königsberg Cathedral
- St. Adalbert's Church, Königsberg, a former Roman Catholic Church in Kaliningrad, Russia, now used as a laboratory

== United States ==
- St. Adalbert Parish (Enfield, Connecticut)
- St. Adalbert's in Chicago, Illinois
- St. Adalbert Parish, South Bend, Indiana
- St. Adalbert Parish, Hyde Park, Massachusetts
- Basilica of St. Adalbert (Grand Rapids, Michigan)
- St. Adalbert, a church in the Roman Catholic Archdiocese of Newark, New Jersey
- St. Adalbert's Basilica, Buffalo, New York
- St. Adelbert's Church (Bronx), New York
- St. Adalbert's Church (Staten Island), New York)
- St. Adalbert Roman Catholic Church, Queens, New York
- St. Adalbert Polish Catholic Church, Dayton, Ohio
- Ss. Adalbert and Hedwig, a church in the Roman Catholic Diocese of Toledo, Ohio
- St. Adalbert in Philadelphia, Pennsylvania
- St. Adalbert's Parish (Providence, Rhode Island)
- St. Adalbert's Church (Milwaukee), Wisconsin
- St. Adelbert's Church (Schenectady), New York

== See also ==
- St. Adelbert's Abbey
- Saint Albert (disambiguation)
