= St. Adalbert Parish =

St. Adalbert Parish may refer to:

- St. Adalbert Parish (Enfield, Connecticut)
- St. Adalbert Parish, South Bend, Indiana
- St. Adalbert Parish, Hyde Park, Massachusetts
- St. Adalbert's Parish (Providence, Rhode Island)

== See also ==
- St. Adalbert's Church (disambiguation)
