= Dvory nad Žitavou =

Dvory nad Žitavou Udvard
- Municipality
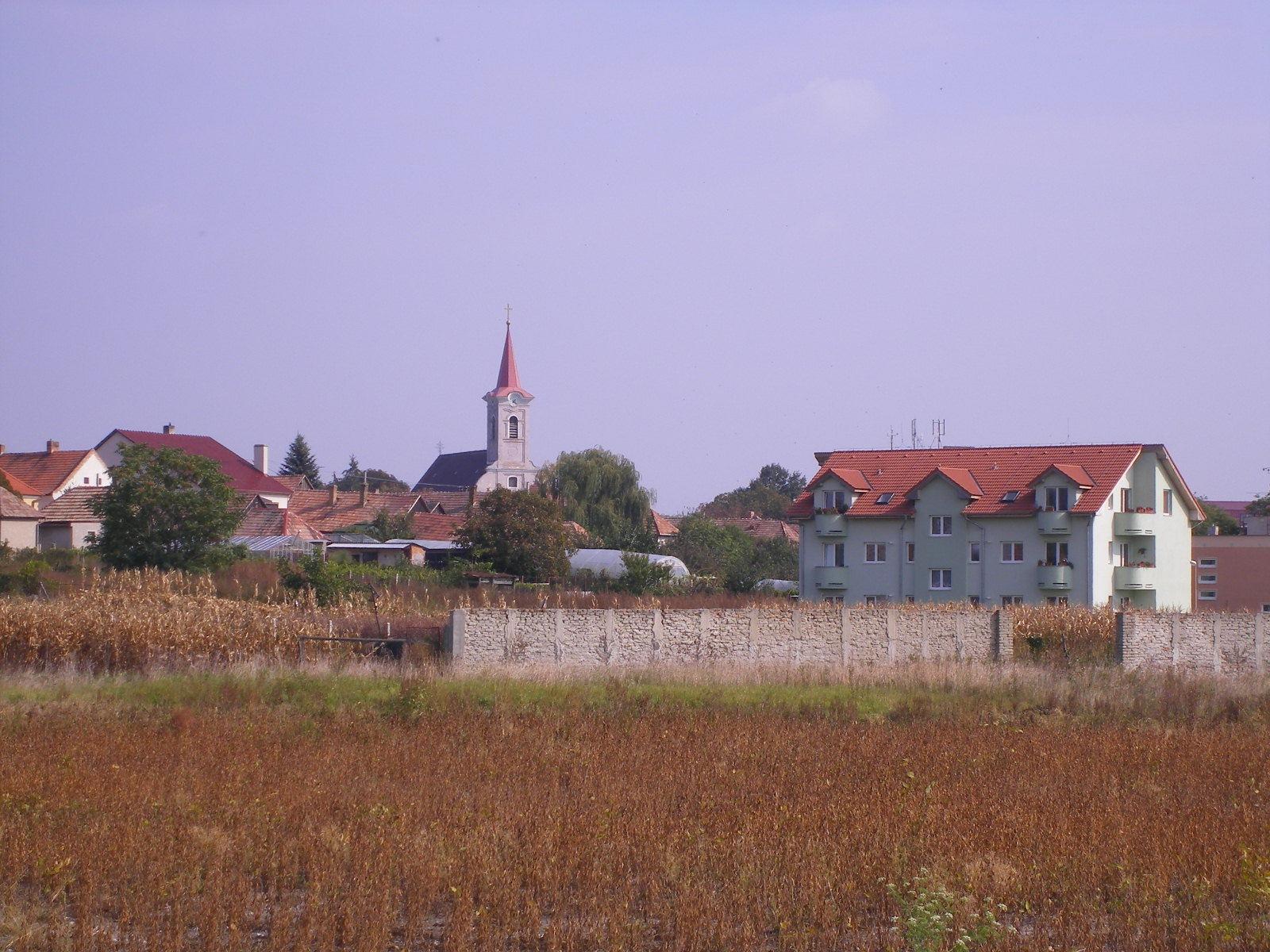

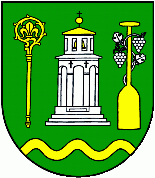
- Flag Coat of arms

- Location of Dvory nad Žitavou in the Nitra Region Location of Dvory nad Žitavou in Slovakia
- Coordinates: 47.99°N 18.26°E
- Country: Slovakia
- Region: Nitra Region
- District: Nové Zámky District
- First mentioned: 1075

Government
  - Mayor: Kristína Fridriková (Independent)

Area
  - Total: 63.84 km^{2} (24.65 sq mi)
- Elevation: 121 m (397 ft)

Population (2025)
  - Total: 4,955
- Time zone: UTC+1 (CET)
  - Summer (DST): UTC+2 (CEST)
- Postal code: 941 31
- Area code: +421 35
- Vehicle registration plate (until 2022): NZ
- Website: www.dvory.sk

Dvory nad Žitavou (Hungarian: Udvard) is a municipality and village in the Nové Zámky District in the Nitra Region of south-west Slovakia.

== Geography ==
The municipality lies at an altitude of 121 metres (397 ft) and covers an area of 63.84 km^{2} (24.65 sq mi) (2025).

== History ==
The first written sign of the municipality is from 1075. It mentions the Latin name of the municipality - Villa Hudvordensium super aquam Sitou - which means the settlement of masters (peasants) above the river Žitava.

The first settlers were the established Pečang-s. The place now known as Udvard was generated from merging 4 settlements Hudvord, Huba, Pazman and Vadkert. Udvard got a license from the king to collect duty on the river crossing and later on the bridge. In 1248 one German knight Resser got a piece of the Udvardian estate as a gift. Later in 1256 another German knight Sebret a Sefrid de Medek got the right of collecting duty on the Žitava river. After the knights left, these estates and rights were given to the Archbishop of Esztergom. The estates given to Garamsaintbenedict-abbey were a conflict-point between the abbot and the archbishop. The estate was thereafter held by the Estergomian archbishop, who held an earth-master position until 1848, the end of the subjugate.

In 1228 the Udvardian masters/peasants organized an insurgency, because of the unbearable taxes that the abbey took from them. This was the first villein-insurgency in the medieval Kingdom of Hungary. Udvard got his name after the masters who were serving in the royal chateau. In the medieval and later ages, Udvard was a place where many significant events took place. 1309 is a very important date because a synod with the Estergomian archbishop as leader took place in the royal chateau on the top of Saint-Martin hillock. At this synod, they legitimated the ruling role of Charles Robert from the dynasty of Anjou's, and they made a decision about the punishment of intemperate criminals who belonged to Čák Mathias (Čák Matúš) and about his own silencing. They prescribed, beside the compulsory morning and afternoon bell-ringing, the evening runging simultaneously with the Angelus prayer. This spread across the district and remains a living tradition.

On October 2, 1429, the Hungarian king and the Roman emperor Sigismund of Luxembourg nominated Udvard as a city with the name-Fairground town Big Udvard. In 1462 the Udvard-district was created with Udvard as its seat. In 1441 Udvard got a broadsword-law from the king. Into Udvard-district, which expanded as far as rivers Danube and Váh flowed, and included 23 settlements and 11 manors. The district dissolved in 1923. Turkish oppression brought great suffering to Udvard. Early in 1530, Turkish armies attacked the city. These attacks repeated with destruction, robbery, killing and deportation until 1533. In 1550 the city suffered another attack, and from 1572 to 1685 August the city was under Turkish occupation. Udvard was one of many cities and towns that were mostly or fully victims of the Turkish destruction.

After the expulsion of the Turkish armies, part of the population returned to Udvard, the other part of the population, new settlers, came from northern Germany.

In 1771 the parish was handed over, and became the municipality's oldest building. In 1776 they completed the Roman Catholic church, in baroque style. It was demolished by Turkish troops. The church became a cultural monument. In the 19th century, Udvard started prospering. On December 16, 1850 the first train passed through Udvard on the new track from Bratislava to Budapest. In 1860 they sanctified the well-known Calvary, which was initiated and organized by Adolf Majthényi. When World War I ended, after the Austro-Hungarian monarchy collapsed and after the Paris Peace Conference in 1919, Udvard became part of the newly established Czechoslovakia. According to the First Vienna Award on November 8, 1938, Udvard was attached to Hungary. This condition lasted until March 29, 1945, when Udvard again became part of Czechoslovakia.

== Population ==
Population statistic (10 years)
| Year | 1995 | 2005 | 2015 | 2025 |
|---|---|---|---|---|
| Count | 5032 | 5115 | 5131 | 4955 |
| Difference | | +1.64% | +0.31% | −3.43% |

Population statistic
| Year | 2024 | 2025 |
|---|---|---|
| Count | 4979 | 4955 |
| Difference | | −0.48% |

It has a population of 4955 people (31 December 2025).

=== Ethnicity ===
Census 2021 (1+ %)
| Ethnicity | Number | Fraction |
|---|---|---|
| Hungarian | 2767 | 55.35% |
| Slovak | 1872 | 37.44% |
| Not found out | 648 | 12.96% |
| Total | 4999 | |

In year 2021 was 4999 people by ethnicity 2767 as Hungarian, 1872 as Slovak, 648 as Not found out, 47 as Romani, 14 as Czech, 5 as Other, 4 as Albanian, 3 as English, 2 as German, 1 as Jewish, 1 as Irish, 1 as Serbian, 1 as Rusyn, 1 as Russian, 1 as Polish, 1 as Moravian and 1 as Bulgarian.

Note on population: The difference values of population numbers in the table "Population statistic" and in the sections "Ethnicity" & "Religion" is caused by the use of various statistical methods.

=== Religion ===
Census 2021 (1+ %)
| Religion | Number | Fraction |
|---|---|---|
| Roman Catholic Church | 3470 | 69.41% |
| None | 681 | 13.62% |
| Not found out | 601 | 12.02% |
| Evangelical Church | 88 | 1.76% |
| Total | 4999 | |

In year 2021 was 4999 people by religion 3470 from Roman Catholic Church, 681 from None, 601 from Not found out, 88 from Evangelical Church, 45 from Calvinist Church, 25 from Jehovah's Witnesses, 23 from Christian Congregations in Slovakia, 23 from Greek Catholic Church, 11 from Apostolic Church, 7 from Other and not ascertained christian church, 6 from Other, 6 from Ad hoc movements, 4 from Old Catholic Church, 3 from United Methodist Church, 2 from Paganism and natural spirituality, 2 from Buddhism and 2 from Baptists Church.

According to the 2011 census, the municipality had 5,164 inhabitants. 3,208 Hungarians, 1,550 Slovaks, 36 Roma, 10 Czechs and 360 others and unspecified.

== Infrastructure ==
The village has a public library, a DVD rental store, and a gym. It is the home of Ovocinárske družstvo OVD Dvory nad Žitavou, a fruit orchard. It is the biggest producer of apples, peaches, plums, cherries, and strawberries in the region.

== See also ==
- List of municipalities and towns in Slovakia
- St Vojtech's Roman Catholic Church
