= St. Casimir Parish Historic District =

Historic district in Indiana, United States

- U.S. National Register of Historic Places
- U.S. Historic district
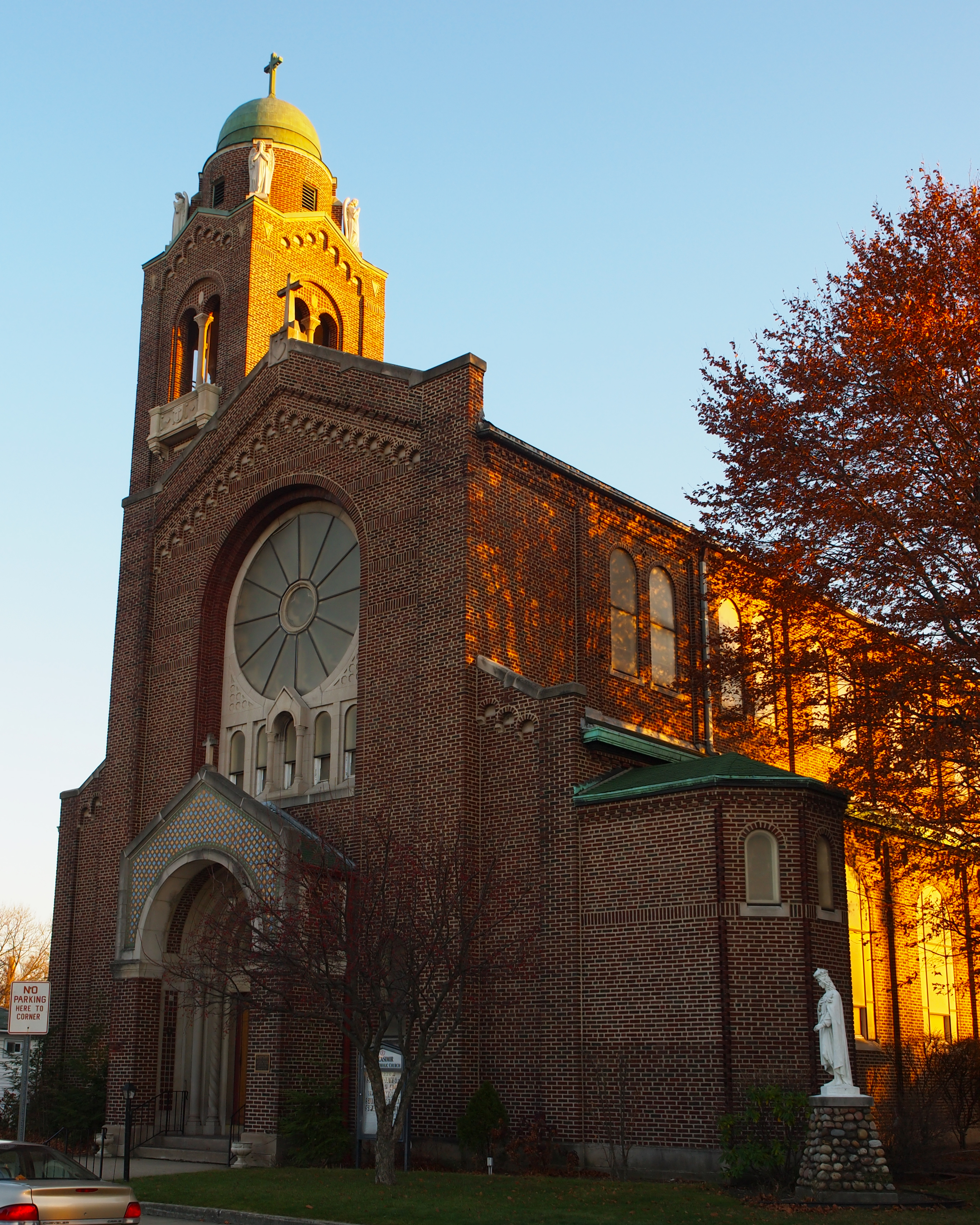
- St Casimir Parish Church, November 2010

- Location within Indiana Location within the United States
- Location: Roughly bounded by Arnold and W. Sample Sts. and Conrail tracks, South Bend, Indiana
- Coordinates: 41°40′01″N 86°16′16″W
- Area: 3.5 acres (1.4 ha)
- Built: 1915
- Architect: Wortherman & Steinbach
- Architectural style: Octagon Mode, Romanesque, Queen Anne
- NRHP reference No.: 96001543
- Added to NRHP: January 16, 1997

St. Casimir Parish Historic District is a national historic district located at South Bend, Indiana. The district encompasses 321 contributing buildings in a predominantly residential section of South Bend centered on St. Casimir Roman Catholic Church. It developed between about 1880 and 1945, and includes notable examples of Queen Anne, Romanesque Revival, Renaissance Revival, and Bungalow / American Craftsman style architecture. Notable buildings include the St. Casimir Church (1924–1925).

It was listed on the National Register of Historic Places in 1997.
