= Henry F. Ludorf =

American architect

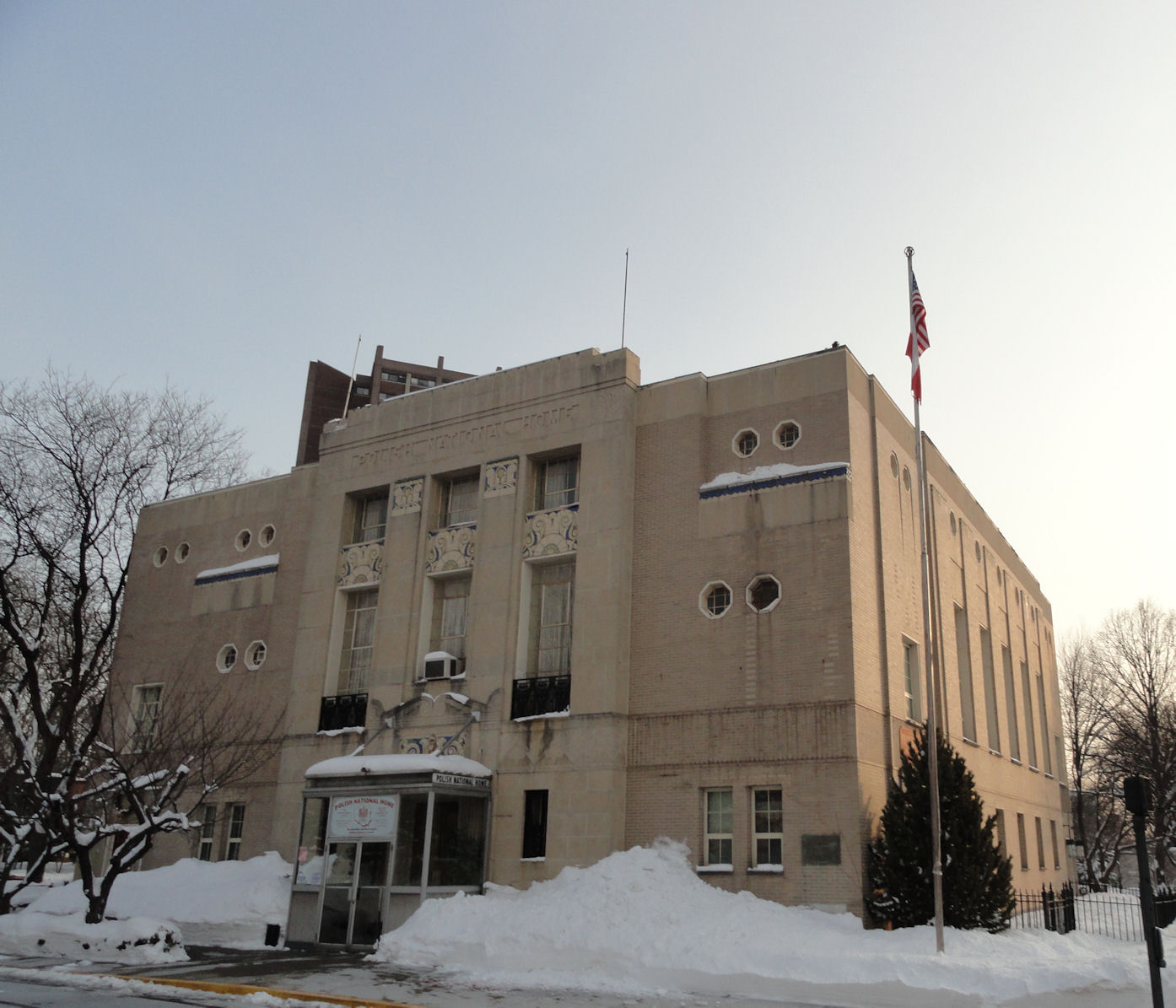
- Polish National Home, Hartford, CT
- Born: 1899; Chicago, Illinois
- Died: 1968 (aged 68–69)
- Known for: Architect

Henry F. Ludorf (1888–1968) was an American architect who specialized in churches and schools mostly for Polish-American Catholic clients in New England.

== Childhood and architectural education ==
Ludorf was born in Chicago in 1899 and graduated from the Pratt Institute of Architecture and the Columbia University School of Architecture. He then worked for two years as a partner of C. C. Palmer before establishing his own firm in 1921. His offices were located at 100 Hanson Place in Hartford, Connecticut.

== Architectural practice ==
Although Ludorf was a prolific designer of churches and schools his most memorable building is the 1929 art deco-styled Community Center of the Polish National Home in Hartford. This building was described in the Hartford Courant as "a stately Art Deco cube with a stylish, comfortable and inviting interior" for which Ludorf "became known for Art Deco buildings in other East Coast cities."

== Personal life ==
Ludorf was chairman of the Ella Burr McManus Trust Fund and the Connecticut Commission on the Fine Arts.

== Works include ==
- St. Adalbert Church, Providence, RI
- St. Anne Church, Hartford, CT
- St Louis Church, Hartford, CT (destroyed by fire)
- St. John the Evangelist Church, New Britain, CT (basement only)
- St. John the Evangelist Rectory, New Britain, CT
- Holy Name Church, Stamford, CT
- St. Peter and Paul Church, Wallingford, CT
- St. Benedict Church and Rectory, Stamford, CT
- St. Mary Church, Bridgeport, CT (renovation, church has been replaced)
- St. Stanislaw School, Bristol, CT
- SS Cyril and Methodius School, Hartford, CT
- St. Joseph School, Webster, MA
- St. Mary School, Middletown, CT
- Polish Community Center, Northampton, MA
- Roosevelt School, New Britain, CT
- Embassy Theatre, New Britain, CT
- Polish Orphan Asylum, New Britain, CT
- Swedish Bethany Church, New Britain, CT
- Community Center of the Polish National Home, Hartford, CT
- Bushnell Tower, Hartford, CT (with I.M. Pei)
