= St. Casimir Parish, South Bend =

Historic church in Indiana, United States

Coordinates: 41°40′0″N 86°16′8″W

St. Casimir Parish
- St. Casimir Parish
- Location: 1308 W. Dunham Street; South Bend, Indiana
- Country: United States
- Denomination: Roman Catholic
- Website: Parish website

History
- Founded: 1898
- Founder: Polish immigrants
- Dedication: St. Casimir
- Dedicated: November 15, 1925 (Solemn blessing)
- Consecrated: May 4, 1949

Administration
- Province: Indianapolis
- Diocese: Fort Wayne-South Bend

Clergy
- Bishop: Most Rev. Kevin C. Rhoades
- Pastor(s): Rev. Ryan Pietrocarlo, C.S.C.

St. Casimir Parish is a Catholic parish in South Bend, Indiana, United States. Founded in 1898. It is one of the Roman Catholic parishes in the Diocese of Fort Wayne-South Bend. It is a central contributing property in the St. Casimir Parish Historic District.

Weekend masses are at Saturday 4:00 p.m. (English, 2nd and 4th Saturdays of the month only), Sunday 9:30 a.m. (English) and 11:30 a.m. (Spanish)

== History ==
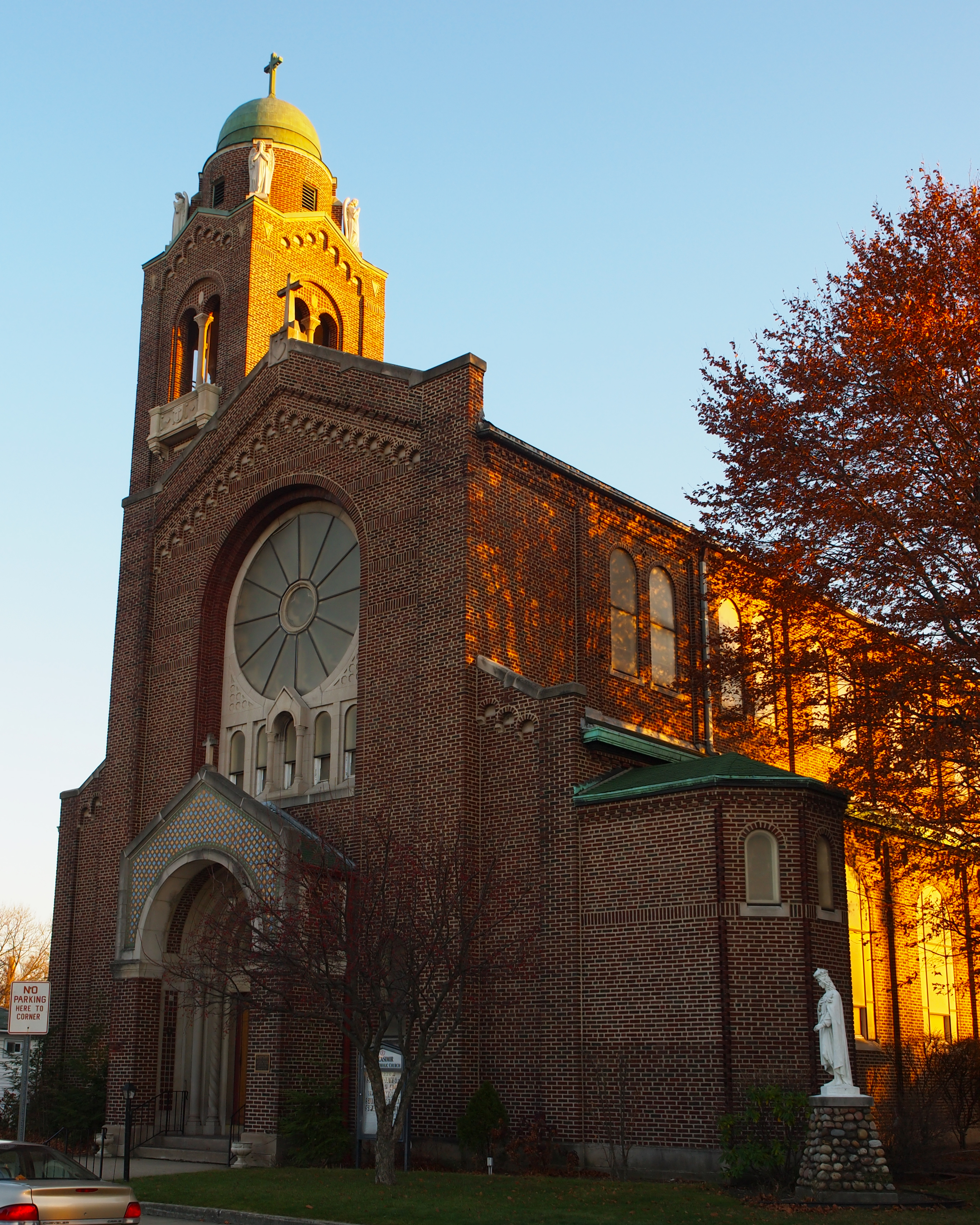
St. Casimir Parish, South Bend, Indiana.

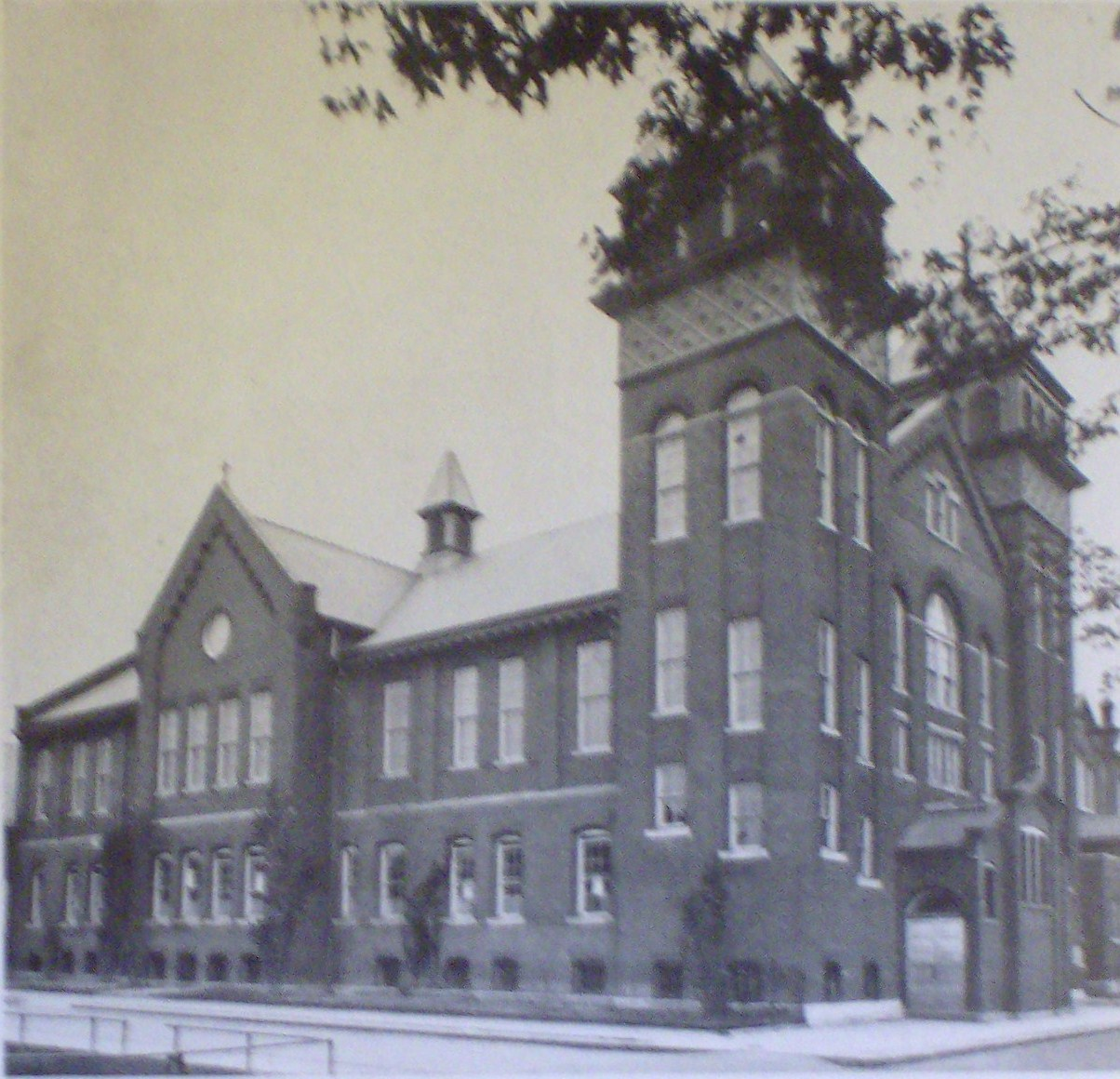
Original St. Casimir Church and School

The parish was founded in 1898 by Polish immigrants. The parish, dubbed "Warszawa," is the second of four Polish American parishes in South Bend, Indiana. Formerly an assistant at St. Hedwig, Rev. Anthony Zubowicz, C.S.C was appointed the first pastor. The new parish started in a two-story combination church-school dedicated in March 1899. The main hall in the school building was used as a church until the present church was built in 1924. The parish is located at the corner of Dunham and Webster streets in South Bend and has been staffed since its founding by the Congregation of Holy Cross.

The greatest single figure in the religious history of the Polish settlement in South Bend is undoubtedly Rev. Valentine Czyzewski, C.S.C. For 35 years he dominated the religious, social and cultural life of the Polish group, taking a hand in the organization of each new parish, founding schools and libraries, organizing missions outside the city, acting as a mediator in labor disputes involving Polish workers, and promoting the general welfare of the Poles in South Bend. On Sunday, March 13, 1893, Fr. Czyzewski announced at St. Hedwig Church that the Polish people, living on the south side of the Grand Truck Railroad tracks, should properly meet and deliberate to choose a place for a church in their neighborhood. By 1896, the neighborhood had grown and Fr. Czyzewski allowed a committee to form to start the new parish. At a meeting on February 10 of that year, Frank Gonsiorowski was elected President of this committee and Joseph Kalamaja its Secretary. On March 2, 1896, Bishop Joseph Rademacher viewed the proposed site from his horse-drawn carriage and said: "This is a beautiful location for a parish, you have my permission." Construction of the combined school and church was begun in April 1898 with the laying of the cornerstone. Rev. Anthony Zubowicz, C.S.C. was appointed the first pastor of the parish on June 11, 1898. Masses were held at St. Hedwig Church for a short time. On March 4, 1899, the new church was blessed and the first mass celebrated.

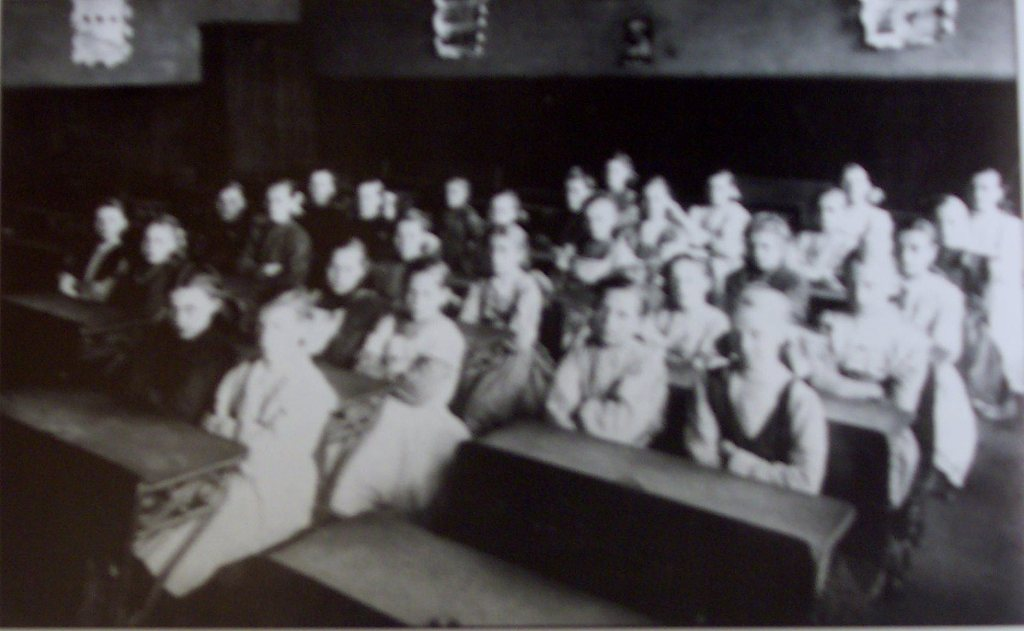
3rd and 4th grades in 1908

Two Sisters of the Holy Family of Nazareth

The parish grade school was opened in 1899. The Congregation of the Sisters of the Holy Family of Nazareth agreed to staff the school. By 1910 the enrollment reached 600 in grades 1 through 8. Children attended morning mass and classes during weekdays. Classes were conducted in Polish and English. Since the children lived in the neighborhood, they walked to school and returned home during the lunch hour before returning for afternoon classes. Children also attended the Sunday morning children's mass, where they sat with their class and were quizzed afterwards by the priest.

On June 30, 1913, Fr. Czyzewski, the Pastor of St. Hedwig and leading Polish priest in South Bend and in the Corgregation of Holy Cross, died. With his death, Rev. Zubowicz was moved to St. Hedwig Parish, South Bend, Indiana, to replace him. Meanwhile, in the nearby parish of St. Adalbert, discontent had grown with the pastor, Rev. John Kubacki. Fr. Kubacki's hated alcohol and tobacco and went to extremes to keep these evils out of his parish. A group of parishioners broke with St. Adalbert, formed a committee at the end of June 1913 and purchased land for a new Polish National Catholic Church.

Shortly thereafter, Rev. W.T. Szalewski, C.S.C., was named pastor of St. Casimir. There was serious resentment and opposition to this choice because he had barred uniformed members of the Polish Falcons of America from a funeral a few years before and because the Parish Council had asked that the Assistant Pastor and parish favorite, Rev. Leon P. Szybowicz, C.S.C., be named as Pastor. In October 1913, Rev. Szalewski left the parish due to continuing harassment by discontented St. Casimir parishioners and members of the newly formed Polish National Church parish. Rev. Szybowicz was also removed by Rev. Andrew Morrissey, C.S.C., the Provincial of the Congregation of Holy Cross, because he had encouraged parishioners to push for his appointment as Pastor. The parish remained closed from October 1913 to February 1914. The Bishop of the diocese, Herman Joseph Alerding, did not seem to take sides in the dispute; leading many parishioners to believe that Bishop Alerding was quietly taking their side.

These tense circumstances of the dispute between the parishioners and church authority led to an event on Feb. 15, 1914 at the parish that was later named "Krwawa Niedziela" or "Bloody Sunday." On that Sunday morning, Rev. Stanislaus Gruza, C.S.C., arrived at St. Casimir and was met by a crowd of opponents. Rev. Gruza had to be both assigned by the provincial and appointed by the bishop. A riot ensued when the priest arrived to begin his duties. A crowd of more than 1,000 people repulsed a squad of 23 police when they attempted to install Rev. Stanislaus Gruza, C.S.C in the rectory of the parish. Numerous people were injured in the melee which included the ripping up of the fence and saplings, ransacking of the rectory, and even hurling of statues.

After the riot, Bishop Herman Joseph Alerding obtained a restraining order against the trustees of St. Casmir church for refusing Father Gruza admittance to the church; 28 people were arrested on various charges. In late March, Fr. Gruza was allowed to take possession of the parish but many parishioners vowed not to cooperate with him. The legal problems were settled and criminal charges dropped in the following months. In the summer of 1915, Rev. Gruza quietly left the parish and was replaced by Rev. Stanislaus Gorka, C.S.C. as Pastor without any opposition. The memory of the riot saddened Rev. Gruza and stayed with him all his life. Although Bishop Alerding remained above the dispute until just prior to the riot, afterwards he was blamed by the parishioners for not making his intentions known and not meeting with them.

The parish was rebuilt under the leadership of Rev. Stanislaus Gorka, C.S.C. Perhaps because the dispute was limited to less than two years, most of the disgruntled parishioners returned. In the 1920s, a new church was built at the corner of Dunham and Webster Streets. This lot which was the site of much of the violence in 1914, now held the parish's greatest pride and joy. The church was blessed by the new bishop, John F. Noll, O.D. on November 15, 1925.

Most of the men of the parish were factory workers. Within one mile of the parish were Studebaker Automobile Corporation which employed 26,000 workers in the 1920s, Oliver Farm Equipment Company with about 3000 workers and several other factories plus many shops and businesses. With the bank crises of 1931 and 1932, unemployment soared and parish finances were bleak until the 1940s. Fr. Gorka often had hundreds of dollars in bills and no money to pay them. He would go to small groceries and shops in the neighborhood, because they had at least a little cash, and ask for small donations.

In 1949 the parish celebrated its golden jubilee. Since the debt on the church was recently paid off, the church was consecrated by Most Rev. Roman R. Atkielski, Auxiliary Bishop of Milwaukee, on May 4, 1949. At this time, the school had 290 students. At least 20 clubs and societies were dedicated to church service, spirituality, youths and teenagers, athletics, drama and literature and civic improvement.

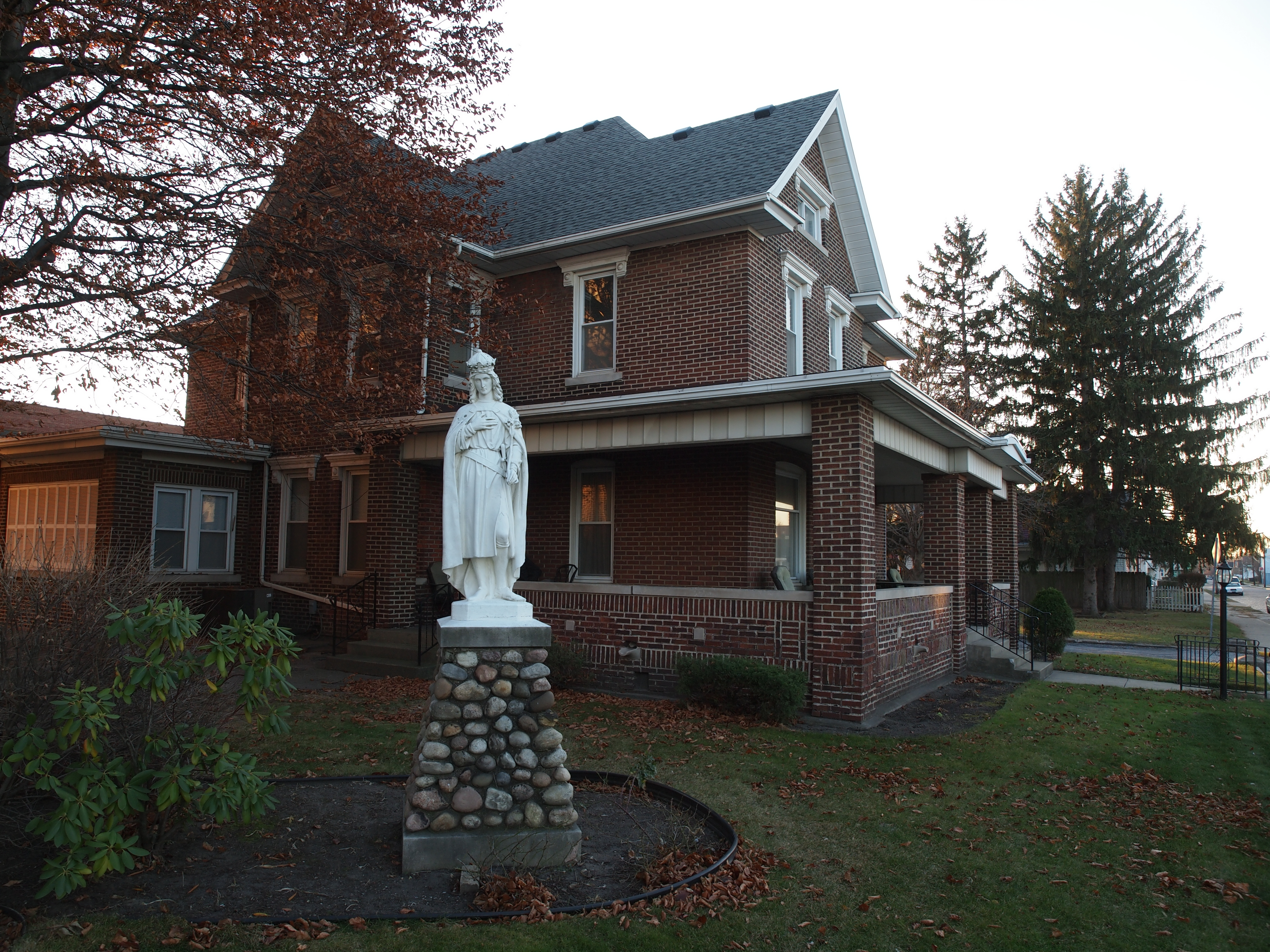
Statue of St. Casimir at St. Casimir Parish, South Bend. Behind the statue, the former rectory, now convent of Felician Sisters is seen.

Since the 1960s, the ethnic makeup of the neighborhood slowly changed from mostly Polish to a mixture of Mexican, Polish, black and others. Also the population of the city declined with smaller households and more empty lots. In 1975, Rev. Leo Wojciechowski, C.S.C. closed the parish school over the strong objections of many parishioners. The school had 156 students at that time but Fr. Wojciechowski did not see a future in the increasingly Hispanic enrollment.

In 1994, pastoral leadership of St. Casimir Parish was consolidated with that of St. Stephen Parish, South Bend; this meant that the same priests would serve both parishes with Rev. Thomas Lemos, C.S.C. as pastor. From February 27, 1997, through March 8, 1998, the parish celebrated its centennial year. The year included, eucharistic processions, parade floats, festivals, a school reunion, and other parties. The year long festivities opened and closed with the annual 40-hour eucharistic devotion held near St. Casimir's feast day on March 4.

In 2003, St. Stephen Parish was suppressed and merged with St. Adalbert Parish, South Bend. St. Casimir Parish has since shared its Pastor and priests with St. Adalbert Parish with the rectory being at St. Adalbert. In 2005, a Spanish language mass was added and welcomed. This Mass is now the source of increasing membership and vitality in the parish. From 2005 until 2018, the former rectory was a convent for the Felician Sisters. In 2009, the parish office of St. Adalbert Parish and St. Casimir Parish were combined into a joint facility at St. Adalbert Parish. Rev. Paul Ybarra, C.S.C. was appointed July 1, 2016, and was succeeded by the current pastor, Rev. Ryan Pietrocarlo, C.S.C in July 2020.

== Architecture ==
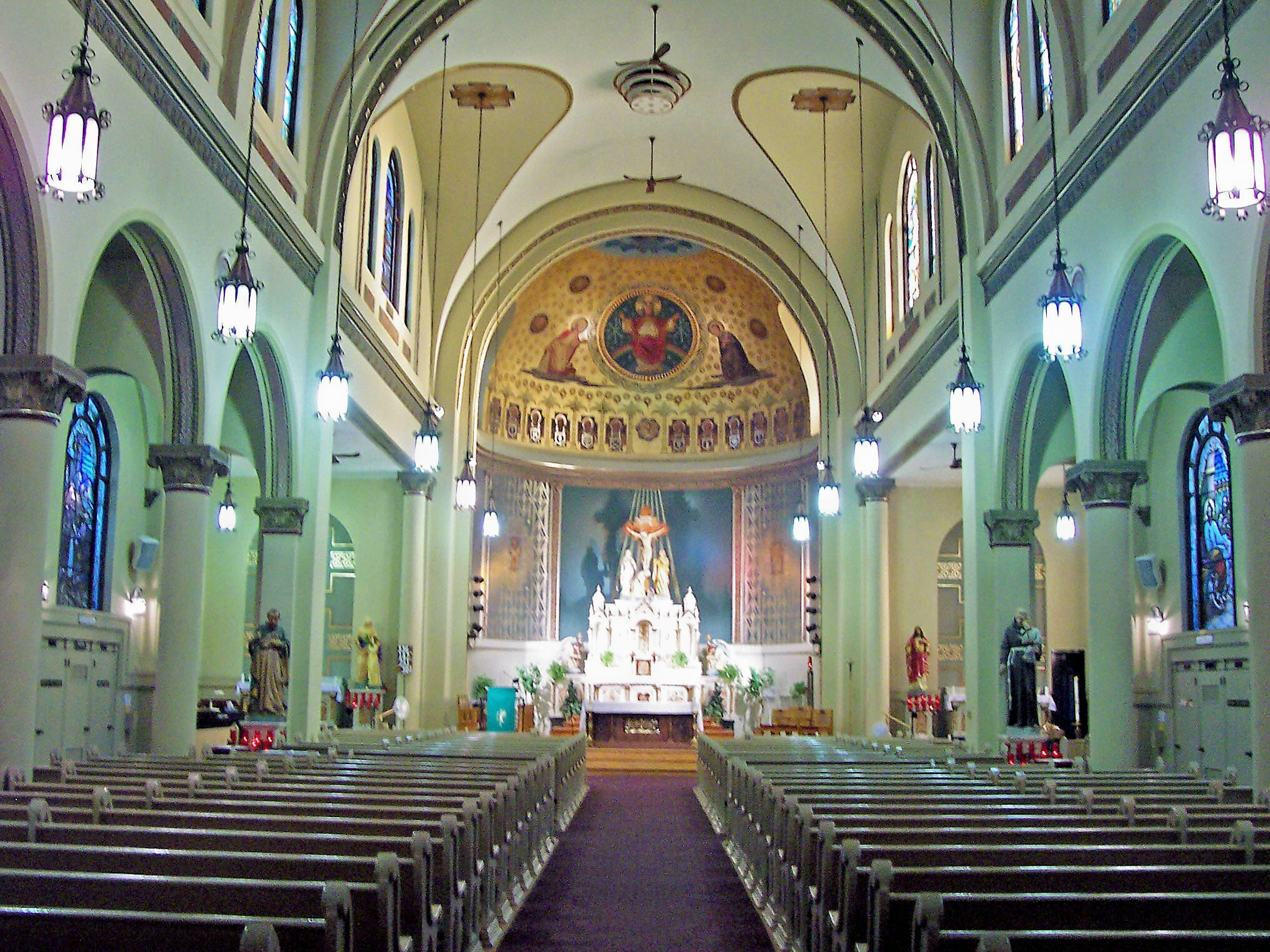
Nave of St. Casimir Church. Images of St. Casimir, Christ the King, and St. Stanislaus Kostka are painted on the aspe above the main altar.

The church was designed by the architecture firm of Worthmann and Steinbach in the Polish Cathedral architectural style. It has Romanesque architecture with Italianate chandeliers. With the arcades running along both sides of the nave and the large arch framing the main altar, the church is reminiscent of St. Paul's Within the Walls in Rome.

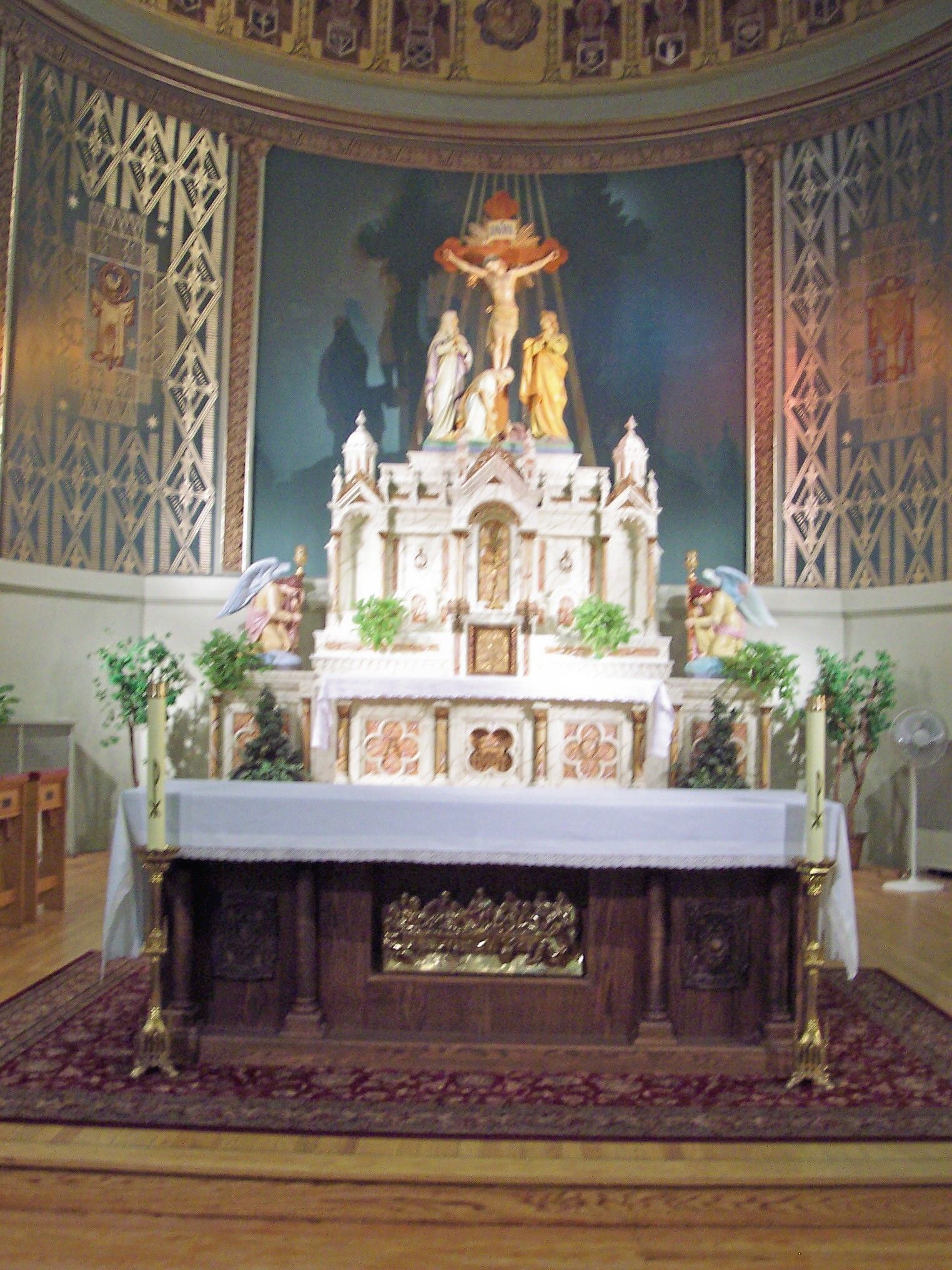
Main Altar and Sanctuary

The exterior is red brick in a traditional Polish style. Because of the beautiful and sophisticated design, St. Casimir church building was given the highest historical architectural ranking by the Historic Preservation Commission that possibly can be assigned - 13 of 13. There are only a few buildings in all of South Bend that have this designation.

== Culture ==
St. Casimir celebrates its Polish American heritage in numerous ways. An annual celebration of Micholaj, a special Polish dinner feast. On the Eve of the Feast of St. Nicholas, the parish celebrates with pierogi, noodles, roast beef, herring, paczkis, and breads. After the meal, parishioners sing "kolendy," that is, Christmas carols. Then, St. Nicholas pays a visit to the children, bringing fruit, candy, and prayer cards.

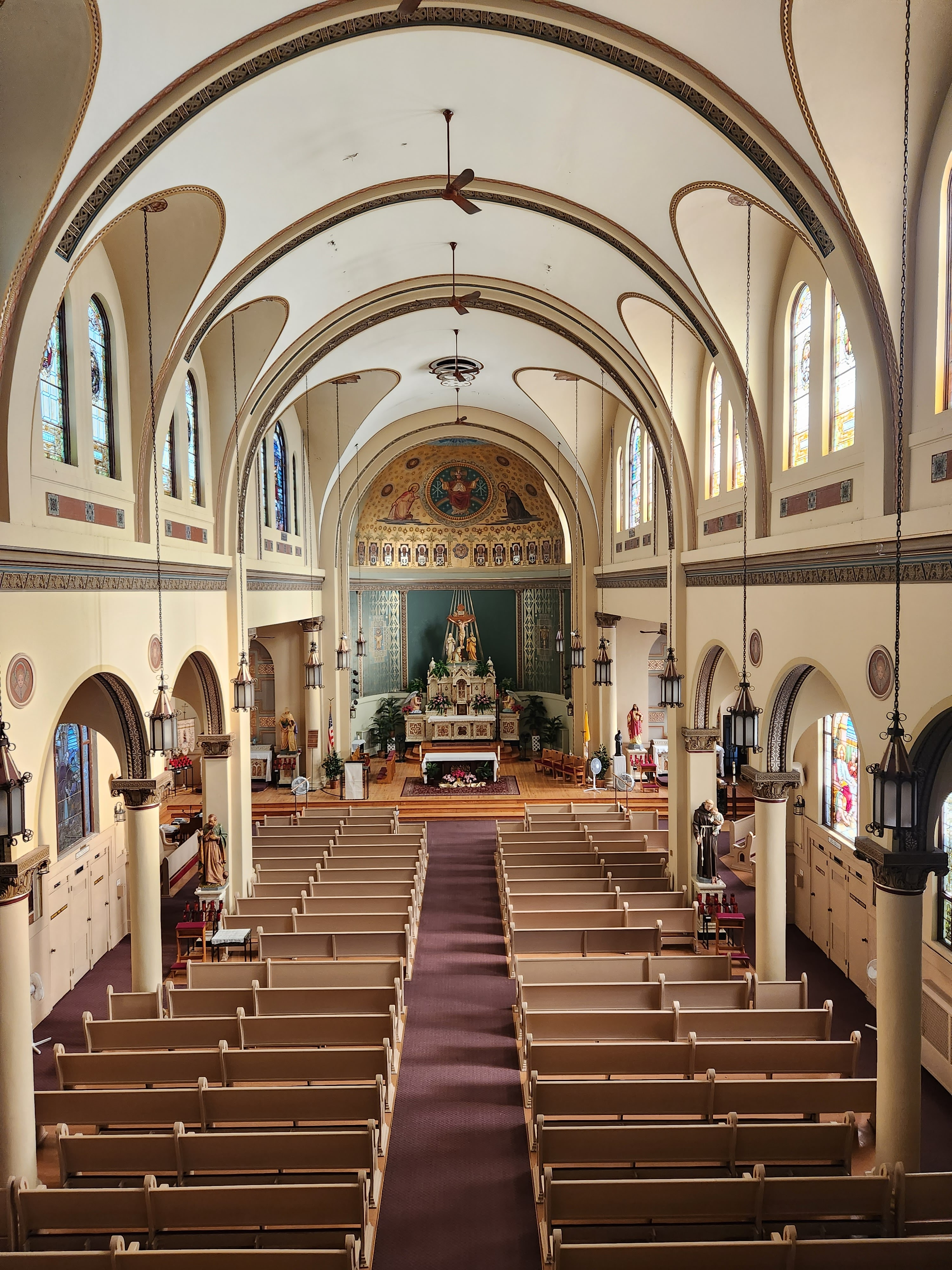
A view from the choir loft into the nave and sanctuary of the church in June 2023.

St. Casimir annually celebrates Forty Hours' Devotion for the feast of its patron saint on March 4.

.

== Pastors ==
- Rev. Anthony Zubowicz, C.S.C. (July, 1898–April 1899)
- Rev. Eligius Raczynski, C.S.C. (April 1899-June 1902)
- Rev. Anthony Zubowicz, C.S.C. (June 1902-July 1913)
- Rev. Mieczyslaw Szalewski, C.S.C. (July 1913-August 1913)
- Rev. Boniface Iwaszewski, C.S.C. (August 1913-October 1913)
- Rev. Mieczyslaw Szalewski, C.S.C. (October 1913)
- Rev. Stanislaus Gruza, C.S.C. (January 1914-September 1915)
- Rev. Stanislaus Gorka, C.S.C. (September 1915-July 1931)
- Rev. Anthony Rozewicz, C.S.C. (July 1931-July 1937)
- Rev. Stanislaus Gorka, C.S.C. (July 1937-August 1941)
- Rev. Boleslaus Sztuczko, C.S.C. (October 1941-July 1946)
- Rev. Casimir Witucki, C.S.C. (July 1946-June 1957)
- Rev. Bernard Niemier, C.S.C. (July 1957-June 1964)
- Rev. George Szymanowski, C.S.C. (July 1964-June 1975)
- Rev. Leo Wojciechowski, C.S.C. (July 1975-June 1978)
- Rev. Howard A. “Gus” Kuhns, C.S.C. (July 1978-June 1987)
- Rev. Joseph H. Fey, C.S.C. (July 1987–June 1994)
- Rev. Thomas F. Lemos, C.S.C. (July 1994–June 2001)
- Rev. David J. Porterfield, C.S.C. (July 2001–June 2004)
- Rev. Christopher W. Cox, C.S.C. (July 2004–June 2010)
- Rev. Peter J. Pacini, C.S.C. (July 2010–June 2016)
- Rev. Paul Ybarra, C.S.C. (July 2016 – June 2020)
- Rev. Ryan Pietrocarlo, CSC (July 2020 – Present)

== Bibliography ==
- Donald Stabrowski, C.S.C., "Holy Cross and the South Bend Polonia," IndianaProvince, Congregation of Holy Cross, Indiana Province Archives Center, 1991.
- The Official Catholic Directory in USA
- Ann Marie Sommers, "St. Casimir Parish Centennial, 1898-1998," South Bend Indiana, March 8, 1998.
- Paul Fujawa and Ann Marie Sommers, "The History of St. Casimir Parish," South Bend Indiana, 1998.
- "St. Casimir Parish, 1899-1949," South Bend Indiana, 1949.
- Rev. J.V. Swastek, "The Polish Settlement in South Bend, Indiana 1868-1924," dissertation at the University of Notre Dame, June 1941.
- Jeffrey Harkin and Father J. Dolan, "The First thirty-Two Years at St. Casimir with Special Emphasis on the Riot of 1914," report, University of Notre Dame, Department of History, April 30, 1972.
- "Nieporozumienia w parafii sw. Kazimierza Kroleicza w South Bend, Indiana, jakie mialo misjsce d. 15 Lutego, 1914," (The Misunderstanding in St. Casimir Parish in South Bend, Indaian which Occurred on the 15th of February 1914), South Bend Indiana, February 14, 1915.
