= Church of Saint Adalbert (Dvory nad Žitavou) =

Church in Nitra Region, Slovakia

Coordinates: 47°59′37.5″N 18°15′51.6″E

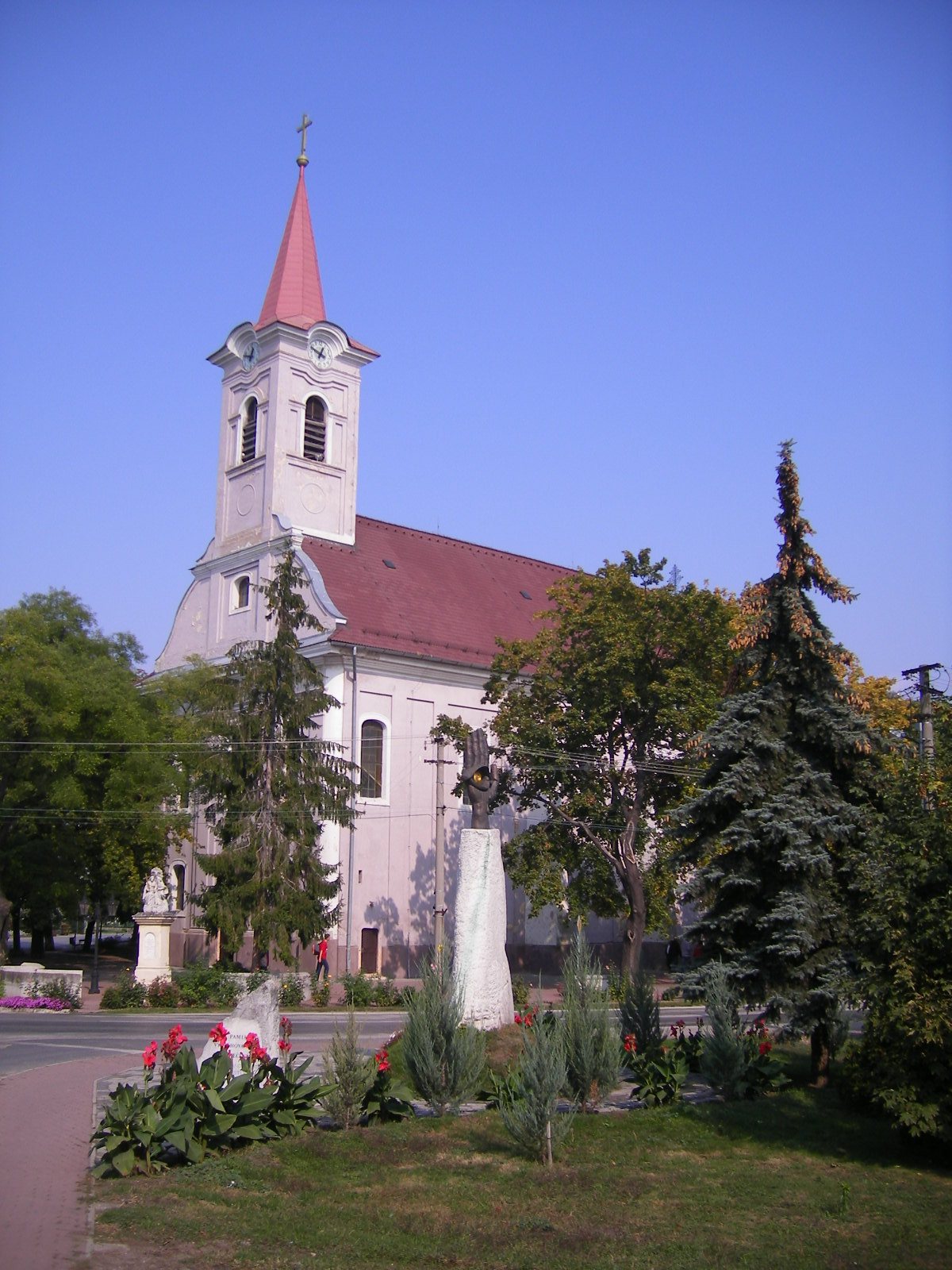
Church of Saint Adalbert

The Church of Saint Adalbert is a Roman Catholic church located in the centre of the village Dvory nad Žitavou in Slovakia. It was consecrated in 1776. The church is situated in the middle of a large green park in Main Square. Today the church is mainly used for liturgical and worship rituals.

== History ==
The first known written record the church dates from the year 1268. The last known record of the original church, which was destroyed in anti-Turkish fighting, dates from the year 1664. The shape and ground plans of the original church is unknown.

The reason for a new church being built was most likely the rapid increase of inhabitants in the village. Construction took place in the first half of 18th century, not including the tower. Around the year 1750 the tower was built in front of the church. Construction included the use of bricks and stones of Nové Zámky's fort. The building of the church lasted until the end of 18th century. During the end of 19th century and towards the beginning of the 20th century large support structures were built.
