= St. Adalbert's Church in Kielce =

Catholic church in Kielce, Poland

- Kościół św. Wojciecha w Kielcach
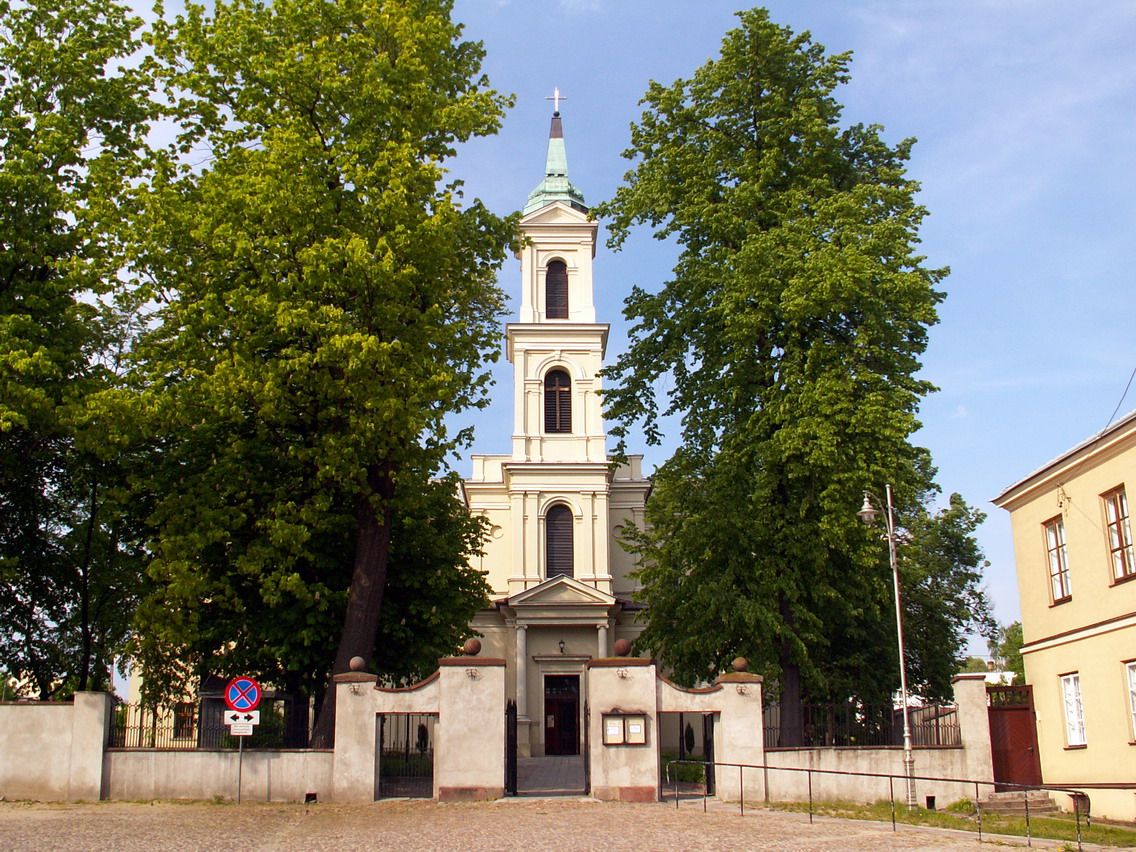

Religion
- Affiliation: Catholic

Location
- Location: Kielce
- Country: Poland
- Interactive map of St. Adalbert's Church in Kielce
- Coordinates: 50°52′23″N 20°38′10″E

Architecture
- Style: Eclecticism
- Established: 12th century
- Completed: 19th century

St. Adalbert's Church in Kielce (Polish: Kościół św. Wojciecha w Kielcach) is a Catholic church in Kielce, Poland. The site is considered the oldest sacral monument in Kielce, predating the city rights of Kielce itself. According to older tradition, it was the site where Saint Adalbert was martyred. The church also houses multiple works by Jan Styka.

The church complex features a manor house and a clergy house. The church is protected on the register of monuments in Poland.

== History ==
The origins of St. Adalbert's Church are associated with a prince and date to the late 12th century, during which time there existed a wooden church. In 1171, it lost parish rights when another church was constructed in the area, and it became a cemetery church. With the support of Fr. Józef Rogalla of Krakow, the church was rebuilt in 1763 with brick to replace the old wooden construction. The church was then enlarged in the late 19th century and consecrated by Bishop Tomasz Teofil Kuliński.

A nearby manor house was also erected in the 19th century for the Chmielewski family.

== Architecture ==
The church is a three-nave structure in the Eclectic style. It features a tall tower facade that is visible citywide.

The nearby manor house is in the classical style.
