= Church of Saint Adalbert, Bydgoszcz =

20th-century Catholic church in Bydgoszcz, Poland

Coordinates: 53°07′38″N 17°58′11″E

Church of Saint Adalbert
- Polish: Kościół św. Wojciecha w Bydgoszczy
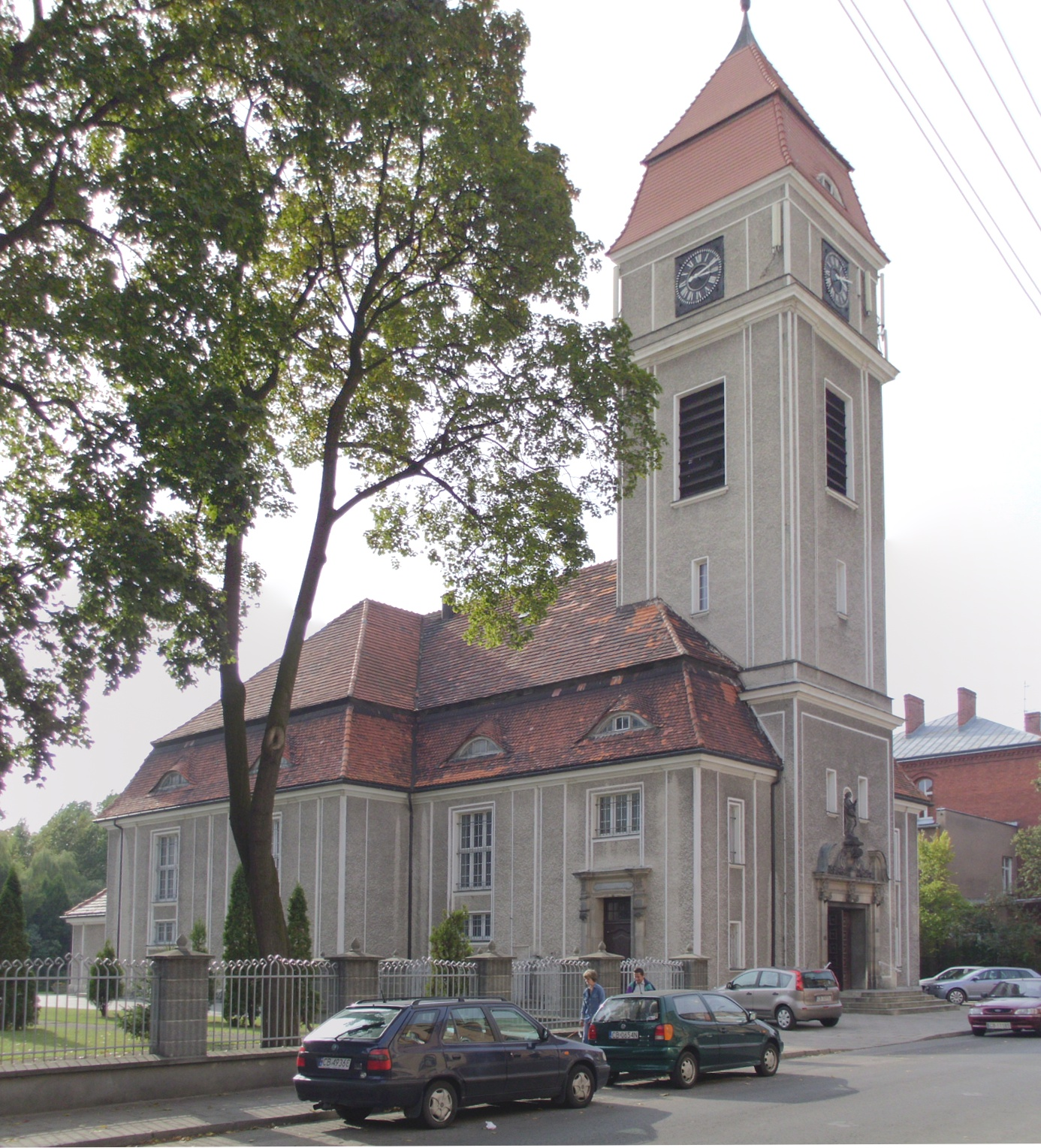
- Church of Saint Adalbert, Bydgoszcz
- Church of Saint Adalbert
- Location: 6 Kanałowa Street
- Country: Poland
- Denomination: Catholic Church
- Website: https://www.swwojciech.bydgoszcz.pl/

History
- Status: Church
- Dedication: Saint Adalbert
- Dedicated: 1945

Architecture
- Functional status: Active
- Heritage designation: Nr. A/1354, 26 February 2008
- Architect: Unknown
- Architectural type: Eclecticism, elements of Neo-Baroque and Neoclassical architecture
- Completed: 1913

The Church of Saint Adalbert (Polish: Kościół św. Wojciecha w Bydgoszczy) is a Catholic church in Bydgoszcz, Poland, located at 6 Kanałowa street in the district of Okole, a few meters from the Bydgoszcz Canal. The building was registered on the Kuyavian–Pomeranian Voivodeship Heritage list on 26 February 2008 (Nr. A/1354).

== History ==
The construction of the church took place in the context of the intensive development of Protestant religious buildings in Bydgoszcz (then Bromberg) and its suburbs at the end of the 19th century and the beginning of the 20th century. At that time, there were already eight Protestant churches in the area, mostly in the red brick Neo-Gothic style.

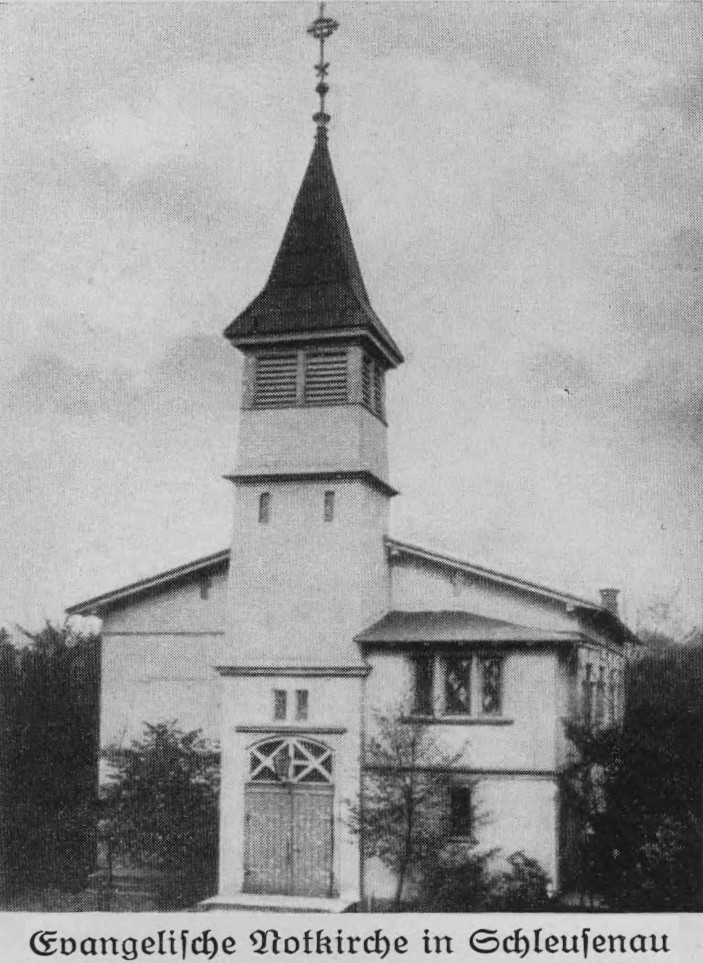
Protestant chapel in Okole, early 1910s

The Evangelical-Unionist community in the suburb of Okole (then Schleusenau) near Bromberg had been established in the second half of the 19th century. In 1891, the Okole community had a chapel constructed on its territory, just across the street from the site of the present church, but rather small compared to the size of the parish. At the beginning of the 20th century, it split into two, with a new community created in the neighbouring village of Wilczak (then Printzenthal), which had a church erected in 1905–06: the present-day Kościół Miłosierdzia Bożego (Church of the Divine Mercy).

To mitigate this, the municipal authorities decided, in the first decade of the 20th century, to erect a new, larger and more impressive building near the location of the chapel, at a time when more than a dozen new Protestant places of worship were being built in the area.

The architect who worked on the church design is not known. Works on the construction and the inside furnishings began in 1912 and were completed in 1913, and the church was dedicated to Saint John the Apostle on 18 December of that year.

The church was used by Okole's German community, which grew until the outbreak of World War I, at the end of which, Bydgoszcz was returned to the re-created Polish territory. In April 1920, the village of Okole was incorporated into the territory of Bydgoszcz.

During the interwar years, Protestant communities in Bydgodszcz decreased significantly in number. Nevertheless, the Church of Saint John the Apostle remained Evangelical-Unionist until 1945. Its last parish priest was Pastor Hans Staffehl, who arrived there in the 1930s; he was also in charge of the parish in Wilczak disctrict.

After the end of World War II and the departure of most German citizens, the Protestant parish ceased to exist. The city council (then the Citizens' Committee of the City of Bydgoszcz) handed over the management of the building to the Catholic authorities.

It was then re-consecrated on 15 April 1945, and dedicated to Saint Adalbert (known in Polish as Saint Wojciech). On 1 October 1946, Cardinal August Hlond established it as a Catholic parish, requiring adaptations to suit Catholic worship.

A priest's house was built from 1977 to 1980, and a parish hall with garages in 1989. A new cross was set up on the tower in Apri 1993, after the previous one had been toppled by a storm. The tower itself was renovated in May–June 2012. In September 2013 the centenary of the church was celebrated at a ceremony led by Bishop Jan Tyrawa, in the presence of the reliquary coffin of Saint Adalbert brought for the occasion from Gniezno Cathedral.

== Architecture ==
The church was built in an eclectic style, combining features of Neo-Baroque and Neoclassical architecture.

=== Exteriors ===
The church, oriented south-north rather than east-west, is built of brick covered with plaster, with a three-aisled layout, on a Latin cross plan with a straight-ended chancel at the south end. The naves and chancel are covered by a mansard roof with eyelid dormers.

The exterior frontages display lesenes and painted window frames, alluding to Baroque Classicist features of the Kingdom of Prussia in the second half of the 18th century. By contrast, the mansard roofs make reference to Rococo-style buildings.

The church's most dominant characteristic is the tall tower adjoining the main body of the structure from the north. It is 42 metres (138 ft) tall and has a clock on each of its four faces. A stone statue of Saint John the Apostle stands above the northern portal.

Compared to the other Protestant churches built at the same time in the area (at Wilczak, Szwederowo and Małe Bartodzieje), the building with its mixed architectural styles stands out.

=== Interiors ===
The central nave is surrounded on three sides by a wooden gallery supported by columns, all of which are decorated by paintings. Its ceiling has a wooden barrel vault with coffers, crossed by painted wooden beams. The chancel features a simple barrel vault while the side aisles have coffered ceilings.

In the 1950s, polychrome paintings were added to the vault in the chancel, depicting scenes from the life of Saint Adalbert.

The pipe organ was built between 1912 and 1915, by Paul Voelkner from Bydgoszcz. It has been entirely restored after World War II, by Józef Sobiechowski which maintained the instrument. Furthermore, Kazimierz Urbański carried out renovations in 1973 and 1996. It now displays a rich, neo-Baroque architectural case.

== Gallery ==
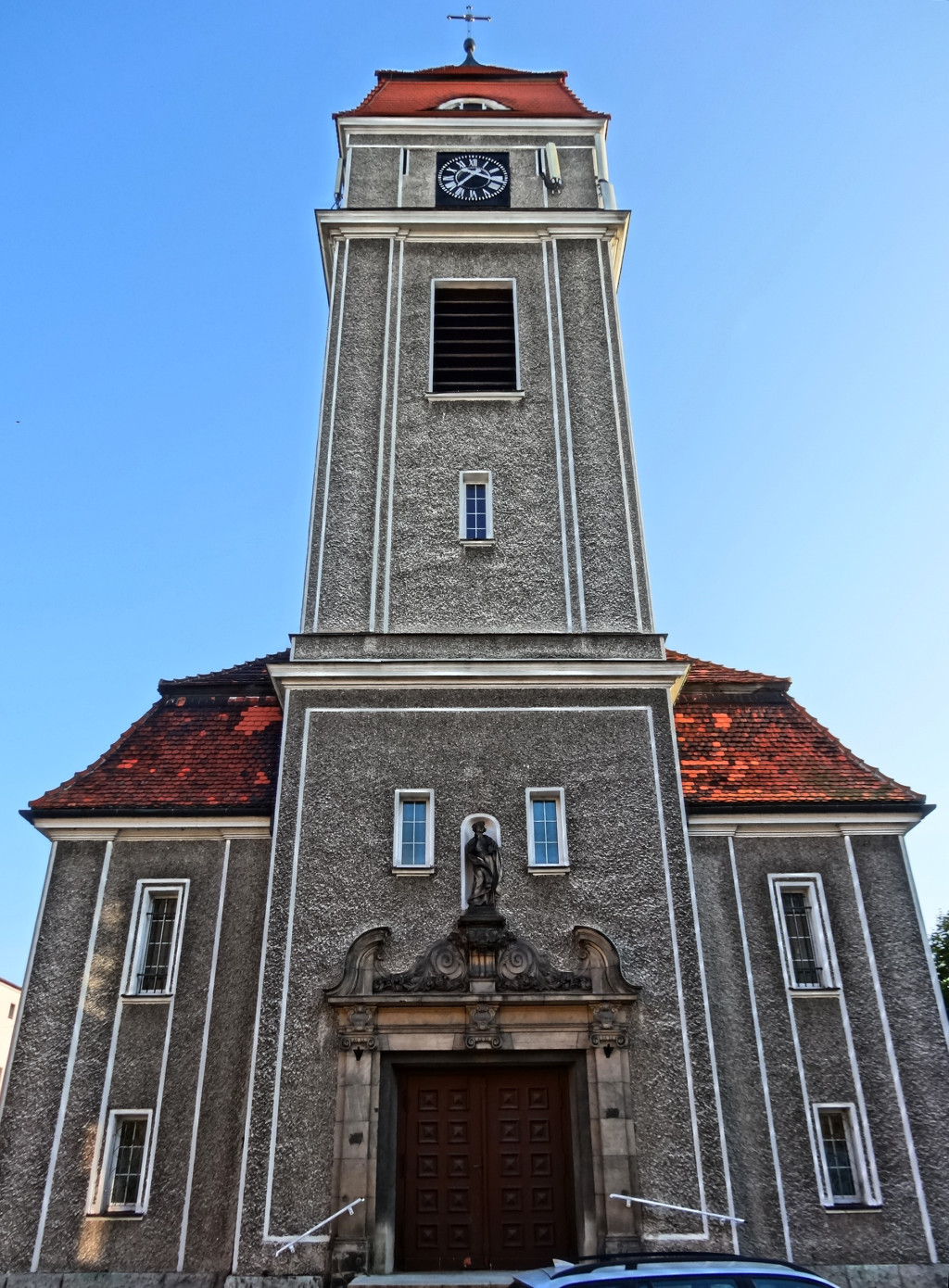
Church tower and north front

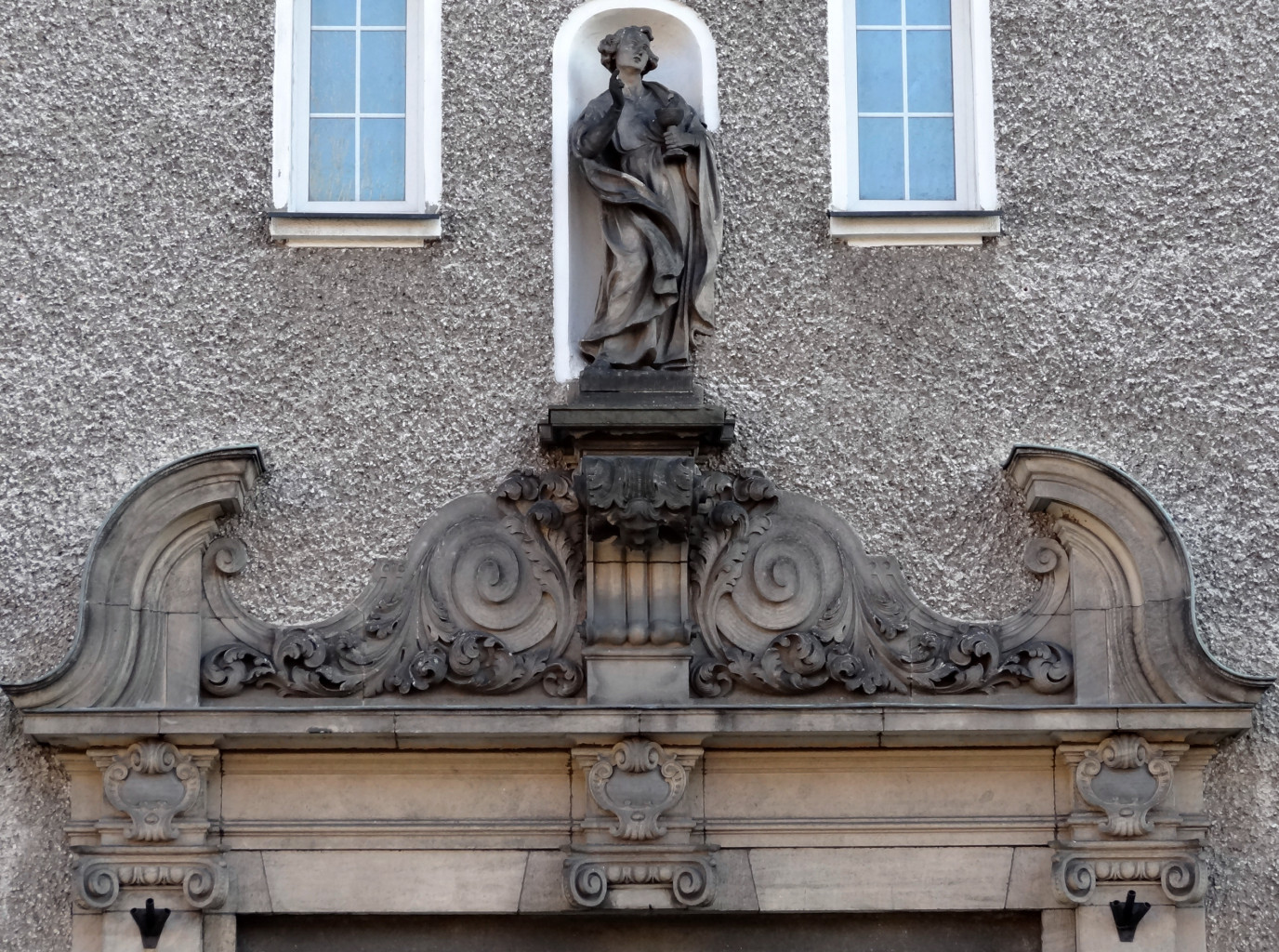
Statue of Saint John the Apostle above the portal

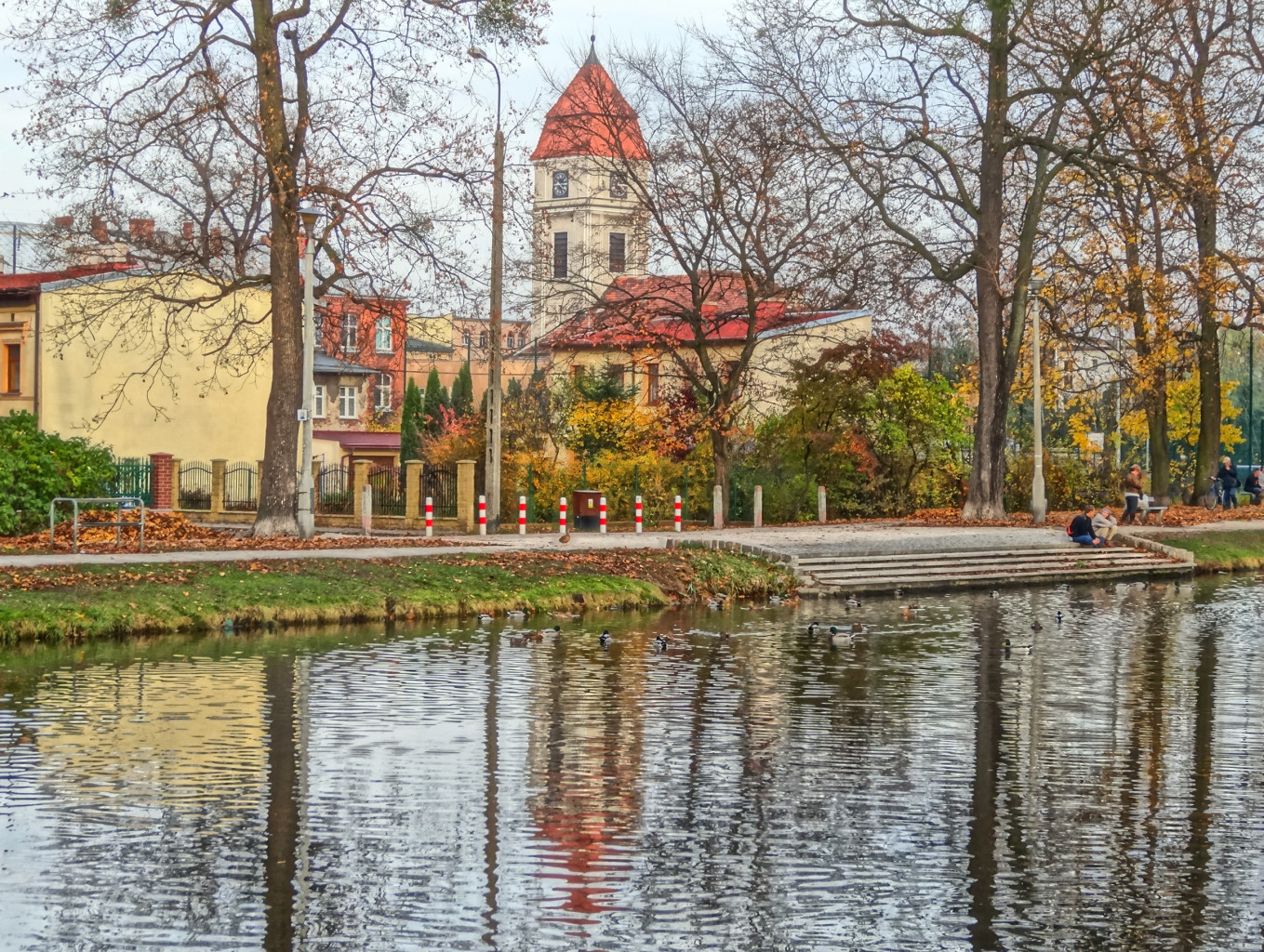
View from the Bydgoszcz Canal

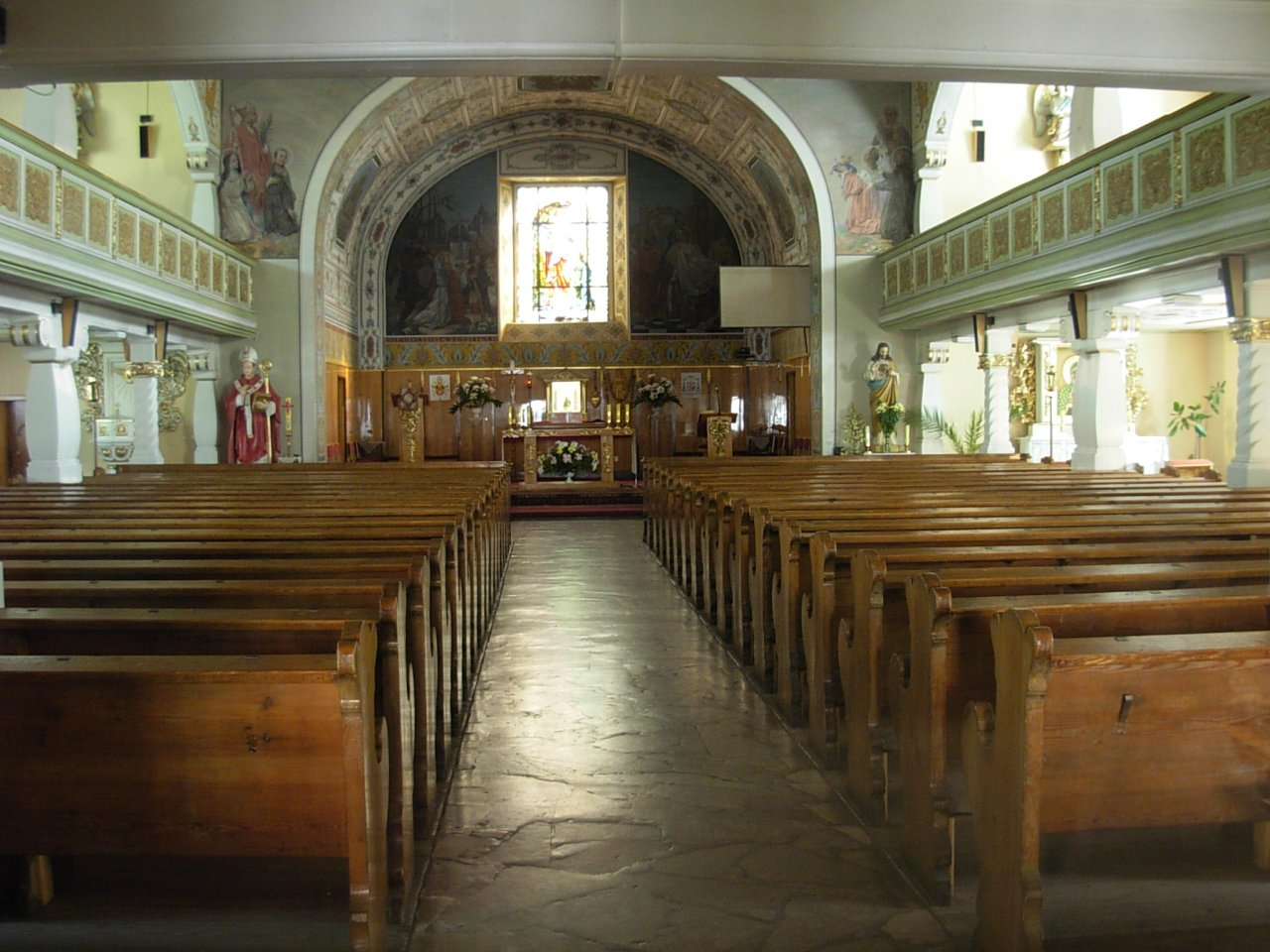
View of the nave

== See also ==
- Bydgoszcz
- Bydgoszcz Canal
- Paul Voelkner

== Bibliography ==
- Parucka, Krystyna (2008). Zabytki Bydgoszczy – minikatalog [Monuments of Bydgoszcz – mini-catalogue.] (in Polish). Bydgoszcz: Tifen.
- Derenda, Jerzy (2006). Piękna stara Bydgoszcz – tom I z serii Bydgoszcz miasto na Kujawach. Praca zbiorowa [Beautiful Old Bydgoszcz – Volume I of the series Bydgoszcz, a city in Kujawy. Collective work.] (in Polish). Bydgoszcz: Towarzystwo Miłośników Miasta Bydgoszczy.
- Kuberska, Inga (1998). Architektura sakralna Bydgoszczy w okresie historyzmu. Materiały do dziejów kultury i sztuki Bydgoszczy i regionu. Zeszyt 3 [Bydgoszcz's sacred architecture in the historicist period. [century] Materials for the history of culture and art in Bydgoszcz and the region. Issue 3] (in Polish). Bydgoszcz: PRACOWNIA DOKUMENTACJI I POPULARYZACJI ZABYTKÓW WOJEWÓDZKIEGO OŚRODKA KULTURY W BYDGOSZCZY. pp. 61–82.
- Derkowska-Kostkowska, Bogna; Winter, Piotr (1998). Z historii zboru ewangelickiego na Wilczaku. Kalendarz Bydgoski [From the history of the Evangelical congregation in Wilczak. Bydgoszcz Calendar] (in Polish). Bydgoszcz: Towarzystwo Miłośników Miasta Bydgoszczy. pp. 219–225.
