= St. Adalbert Parish (Enfield, Connecticut) =

Coordinates: 42°00′8.7″N 72°35′46″W

St. Adalbert Church
- St. Raymond of Penafort Parish
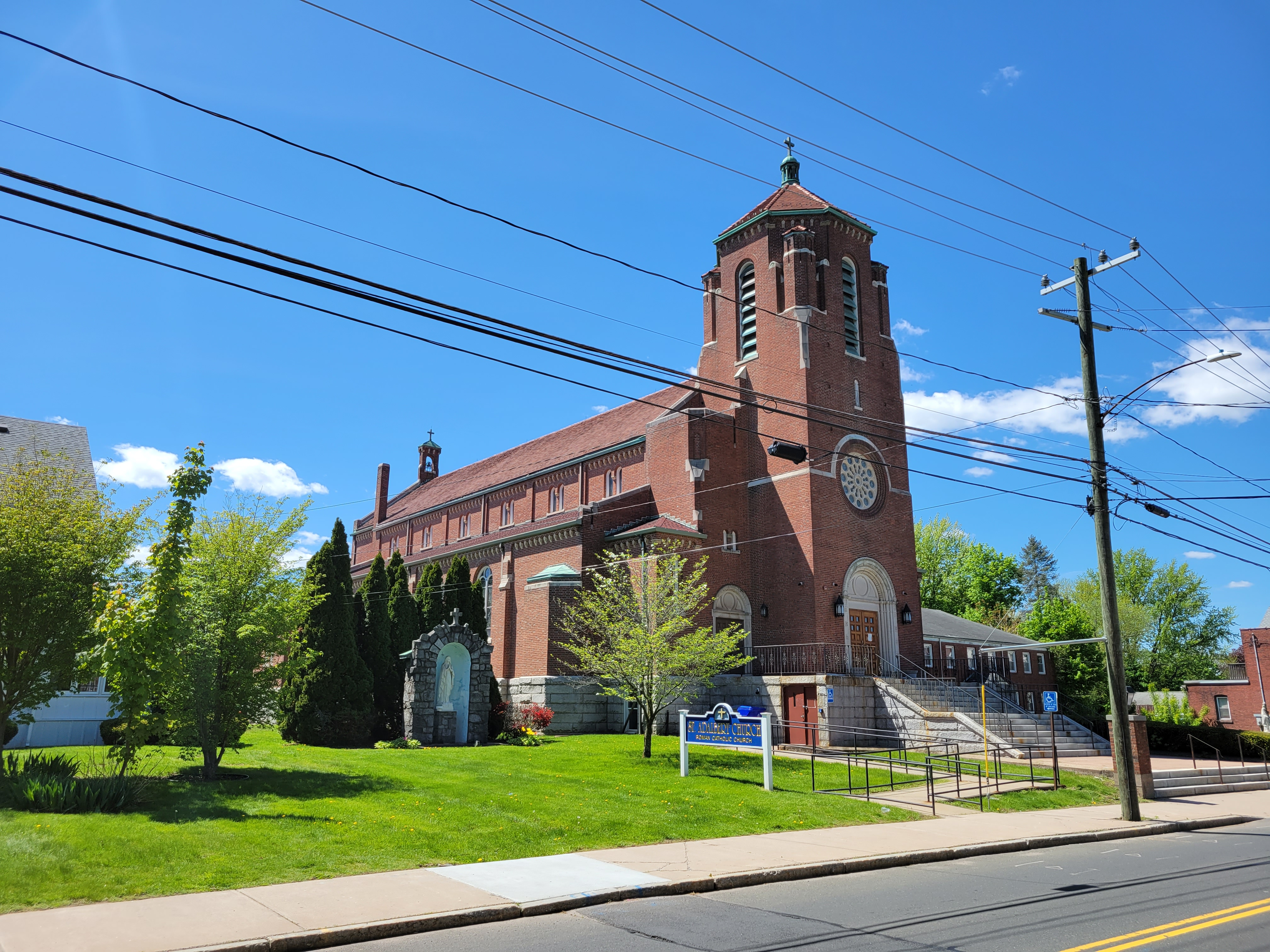
- St. Adalbert Church
- St. Adalbert Church
- Location: 90 Alden Avenue; Enfield, Connecticut
- Country: United States
- Denomination: Roman Catholic (former)
- Website: St. Raymond of Penafort Parish website

History
- Founded: January 17, 1915
- Founder: Polish immigrants
- Dedication: St. Adalbert
- Dedicated: July 8, 1928

Architecture
- Closed: April 21, 2024

Administration
- Division: Vicariate: Hartford
- Province: Hartford
- Archdiocese: Hartford
- Parish: St. Adalbert (1915-2017) St. Raymond of Penafort (2017-22) St. Jeanne Jugan (2022-24)

Clergy
- Archbishop: Most Rev. Leonard Paul Blair, S.T.D.
- Bishop(s): Most Rev. Christie Macaluso, D.D.
- Priest: Rev. Anthony J Bruno
- Pastor: Rev. Sebastian k. Kos

St. Adalbert Parish - designated for Polish immigrants in Enfield, Connecticut, United States. Founded in 1915, it is one of the Polish-American Roman Catholic parishes in New England in the Archdiocese of Hartford.

In 2017, St. Adalbert was merged with St. Patrick Parish in Enfield to form St. Raymond of Penafort parish. In 2022, the consolidated St. Raymond parish was merged into townwide parish under the name St. Jeanne Jugan parish. The St. Adalbert church building was closed to regularly scheduled worship soon after and was closed permanently after a final Mass on April 21, 2024.

== History ==
On September 1, 1907, Bishop of Hartford, Michael Tierney made the priest Paul W. Piechocki responsible for the Polish immigrants. Bishop John Joseph Nilan established St. Adalbert Parish on January 17, 1915. Stanislaus Federkiewicz was named first pastor. The first Mass was offered in the unfinished church basement on Christmas 1915. Nilan dedicated the lower church on May 7, 1916. Finally, the completed St. Adalbert Parish was dedicated by Bishop Maurice F. McAuliffe on July 8, 1928. St Adalbert Church build has been closed by the Archdiocese of Hartford and the buildings are for sale. https://www.loopnet.com/Listing/Church-Complex-Redevelopment-Opportunit/27724332/

The church was purchased by a Hispanic group, Ministerio Tiempo de Cosecha (Harvest Time Ministry).

== Bibliography ==
- John P. Gwozdz, A Place of Their Own. A History of Saint Adalbert Church, Enfield, Connecticut, 1915-1990, reviewed in Polish American Studies, Vol. 48, No. 2 (Autumn, 1991), pp. 87–89.
- The 150th Anniversary of Polish-American Pastoral Ministry. Webster, Massachusetts: St. Joseph Basilica. September 11, 2005.
- The Official Catholic Directory in USA
