= St. Adalbert Parish, South Bend =

St. Adalbert Parish
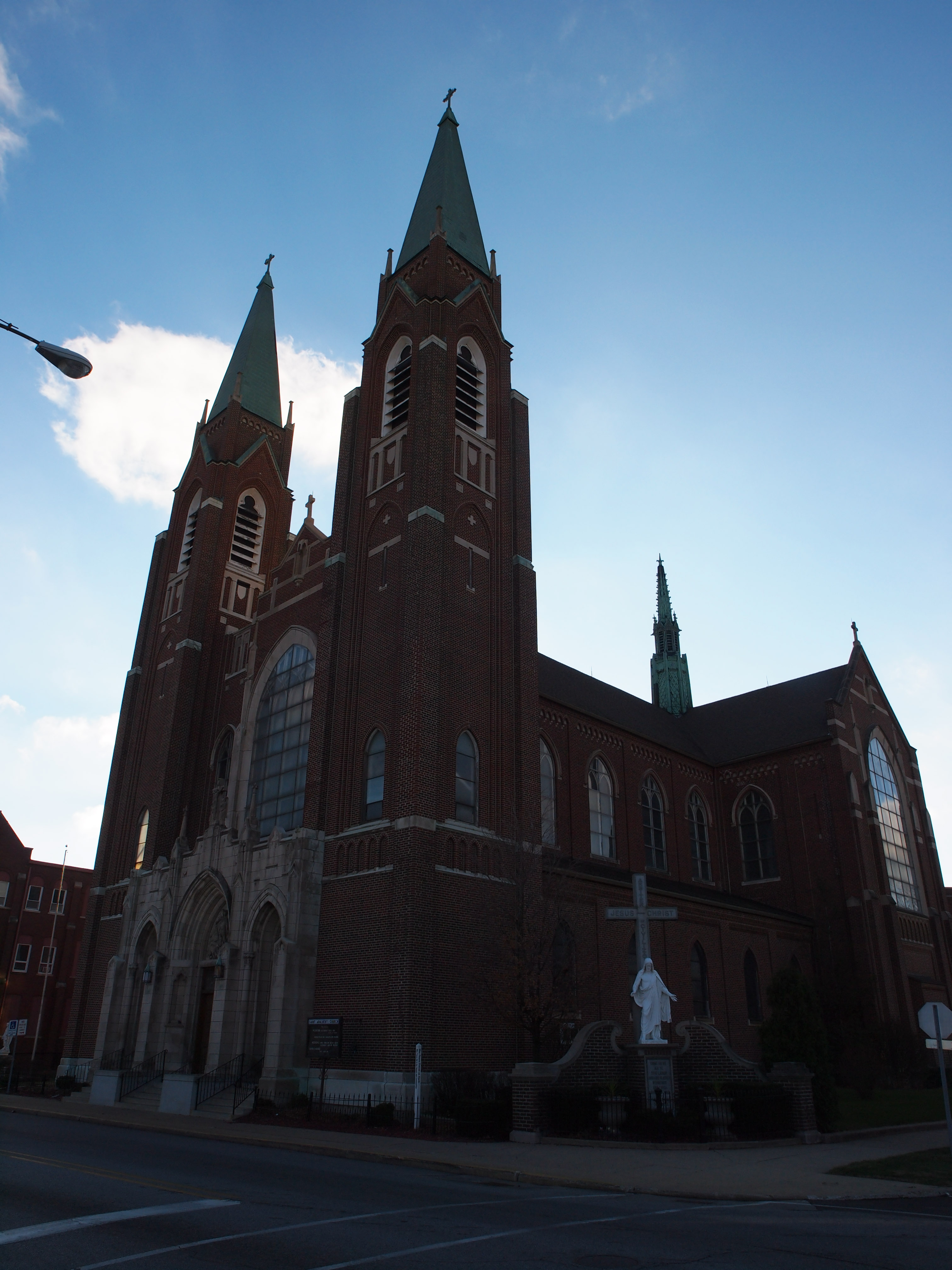
- St Adalbert's church, South Bend
- St. Adalbert Parish
- 41.669980°N 86.283580°W
- Location: 2505 W. Grace Street; South Bend, Indiana
- Country: United States
- Denomination: Roman Catholic
- Website: Parish website

History
- Founded: October 16, 1910
- Founder: Polish immigrants
- Dedication: St. Adalbert of Prague

Administration
- Province: Indianapolis
- Diocese: Fort Wayne-South Bend

Clergy
- Bishop: Most Rev. Kevin C. Rhoades
- Pastor(s): Rev. Ryan Pietrocarlo, C.S.C.

St. Adalbert Parish – dubbed the "Cathedral of the West Side" – is a Catholic parish in South Bend, Indiana, United States. The parish was founded in 1910, and is one of the Roman Catholic parishes in the Diocese of Fort Wayne-South Bend.

== History ==
St. Adalbert Parish was founded in 1910 as the last of four Polish Roman Catholic parishes located in South Bend, Indiana. Although many immigrants came to this area in a very poor condition their faith spurred them on and led them to the construction of several churches, the largest being St. Adalbert.

On August 7, 1905, the St. Adalbert Fraternal Aid Society was officially organized. The new parish was to be named after St. Adalbert, Bishop and Martyr, with the settlement called “Krakow”. This group of dedicated organizers made house to house collections to purchase land for the church and school building. The nickels and dimes amounted over a period of time until $402.10 was collected to purchase two lots on Warren and Huron Streets. It was decided through the advice of Rev. Valentine Czyzewski, to purchase land on Olive between Huron and Grace in 1907as the site of construction. By the fall of 1909, the foundation for the building was laid and the present school had its beginning. Funds for the completion of the structure were not readily available, and nearly $8,000 was needed to finish the project. Rev. Czyzewski spearheaded the house-to-house collection, took a census to establish the membership of the new parish, provided spiritual guidance and was the temporary director of organizing the parish.

The Most Rev. Herman Joseph Alerding appointed a pastor, Rev. John Kubacki, who arrived on July 2, 1910. Rev. Kubacki seized the opportunity to organize several parish societies and began ministering to the parishioners' spiritual needs while members of the parish began collecting funds for construction of the new parish. Soon thereafter the cornerstone was dedicated on Sunday, September 4. 1910 by the Most Rev. Paul Peter Rhode, the first Polish Bishop in the United States. The first mass was celebrated on October 16, 1910, in the open air, upon special permission for all parishioners to attend, between the two walls of the new church by Rev. Kubacki. Under the leadership of Rev. Kubacki, the men and women voluntarily continued to erect the new Church – Parish School building. The entire building later became the present Parish School and Heritage Center.

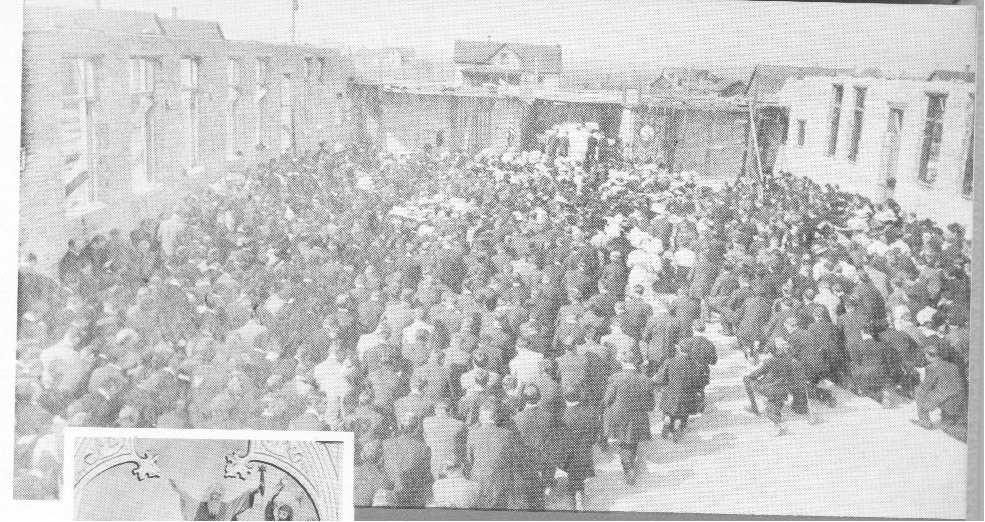
Fr. John Kubacki celebrates the first mass of St. Adalbert Parish on October 16, 1910.

The Parish School was dedicated on September 4, 1911, and the Felician Sisters from Detroit, Michigan opened and staffed the school that same September. Rev. John Wroblewski was the first resident assistant coming to St Adalbert's on June 23, 1912. The three original church bells were also installed that same year. At the corner of Huron Street and Olive Street, the Christ statue was dedicated on the occasion of Rev. Kubacki's Silver Jubilee on June 19, 1919. Under Rev Kubacki several assistants served the parish. In 1913, Rev John Tarlowski replaced Father Wroblewski. In June 1915 the present rectory was completed and accommodated the following assistants during that period: Rev Herek, Rev Vincent Rozmus, Rev. John Mard and Theophil Chemma. The new parish also had its share of those entering the priesthood with Rev John Wroblewski being ordained in 1912 and Rev. Michael Gadacz in 1917.

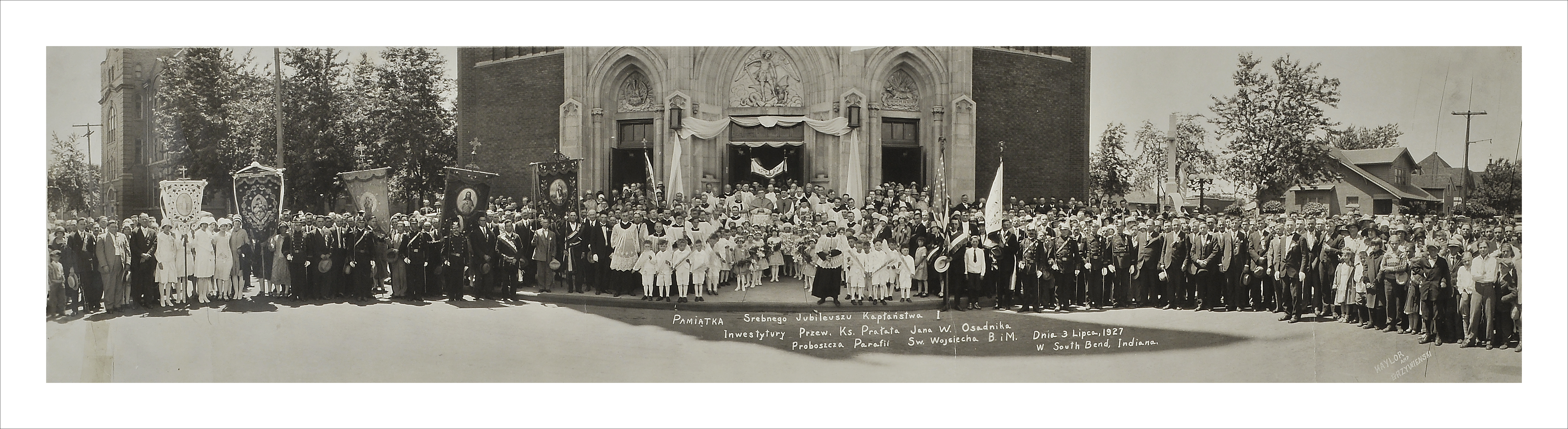
Msgr. Jan Osadnik celebrates his investiture as Monsignor with parishioners on July 3, 1927.

The next Pastor was Rev. John W Osadnik led the parish beginning on February 7, 1920. His forte was being responsible for so many souls and he concerned himself at all times with making them conscious of daily progress in Christian virtue. Bernice Klug became the first parish organist in 1920. Rev Osadnik decided soon after he became pastor that the Church School building was inadequate as a church and school. Therefore, a parish meeting was held in 1923 to discuss the renovation of the original building for a school and the erection of a new church. The official laying and dedication of the cornerstone for the new church took place on July 29, 1923. Due to lack of funds, the work began but proceeded slowly. This was but another example of the continued struggle of the parishioners spurred on by a fervent pastor. The new church, considered the largest and most beautiful in the Diocese was completed in spring of 1926 at a cost of $23,000 and was blessed by Bishop John F. Noll. It originally was built to be the diocese's cathedral, but a new building was then designated, in what was considered a slight to the polish community. Rev. Aloysius Jarka and Rev. John Biernacki served as assistants at that time. In May 1931, a temporary parish hall was erected because the depression caused deep financial stress. The Parish celebrated its Silver Jubilee on Sunday, October 20, 1935. Now a Monsignor, Rev. Osadnik retired on January 23, 1940. He was followed by Rev. Aloysius Jarka appointed by Bishop Noll. Due to illness Rev. Jarka's pastorship was short and he died September 20, 1943. Another memorable event took place during this era as Rev. Louis Ratajczak became the first parishioner to be ordained on May 26, 1923, by Bishop Aldering. Other assistants serving the growing congregation included Rev. Anthony Nadolny, Rev. Michael A. Petzold, Rev. Augustine S. Kondziela, Rev. Wenceslaus A. Karp, Rev. Michael Urbanski, Rev. Leon Pisula, Rev. John Moskal and Rev. Joseph Zielinski. New ordinations of parishioners continued in 1931 with Rev. Clement Ewald, Rev. Casimir Moskwinski and Rev. Louis Jeziorski being ordained priests.

Upon the death of Rev. Jarka, the Rev. Joseph Zielinski was appointed administrator of the parish. On January 27, 1944, Rev. Ignatius Gapczynski was appointed pastor by Bishop Noll. Rev. Gapczynski introduced English sermons on Sundays for the benefit of younger Poles and people of other nationalities. Many improvements were also done to the whole facility during his pastorate. One of the most notable was the liquidation of the parish debt on February 1, 1948. By 1950 Rev. Gapczynski was elevated to the position of Monsignor. Serving the parishioners as assistants under Rev. Gapczynski were Rev. John J Jakubielski, Rev. Andrew C Topor, and Rev. Thomas Depa. It was under Msgr. Gapczynski that Rev. Eugene Kazmierczak served as an assistant beginning on July 4, 1951. Under Msgr, Gapczynski a new power house was added in 1957 and a new Sisters Convent in 1963. The Golden Jubilee was also celebrated in 1960.

Through 75 years the school prospered with its enrollment peaking in 1929–30 at 1112 students. Graduates ordained over the years include Rev. Henry Smarcz (1945), Rev. William Gieranowski (1949), along with Rev. Thaddeus Olszewski, Rev. Matt Sienkiewicz and Rev. Leonard Chrobot ordained during Msgr. Gapczynski's latter years.

On July 20, 1964, the Very Rev. Ignatius Gapczynski died and Rev. Kazmierczak was appointed acting pastor. Rev. John J. Moskal was appointed pastor that same year on September 1, 1966. The Rev. Kazmierczak was assigned to Geneva, Indiana. Rev. Moskal remained pastor until 1972. Under Father Moskal, Rev. Matt Kafka and Rev. Thaddeus Kwak served as assistants.

On July 1, 1972, Rev. Eugene J Kazmierczak was appointed the new pastor. In June 1972 the parish Hall burned down presenting the first major challenge to the new pastor. In 1973 a Building Committee was formulated and by 1974 the hall and old sisters home was demolished. In April 1974, the Harvest House Program was started and has become to this day a focal point for many senior citizens.

Following Rev. Kazmierczak, native-son Rev. Leonard Chrobot served as pastor from 1992 to 1995. In 1995, Rev. Daryl Rybicki arrived as pastor, serving until 2002. In 2002, Most. Rev. John Michael D'Arcy sent Monsignor William Lester to administer the parish until it merged with St. Stephen of Hungary Parish in South Bend. The traditionally immigrant neighborhood of St. Adalbert had become home to new immigrants, Latinos. St. Stephen Parish was home to both Hungarians and Latinos. In May 2003, St. Stephen closed, and the parishioners came to St. Adalbert. With the merger, the parish was entrusted to the pastoral care of the Congregation of Holy Cross. Rev. David Porterfield, C.S.C. administered the merged parish with Rev. Christopher W. Cox, C.S.C. as his associate pastor. On July 1, 2004, Rev. Cox was appointed pastor of both St. Adalbert Parish and St. Casimir Parish, South Bend.

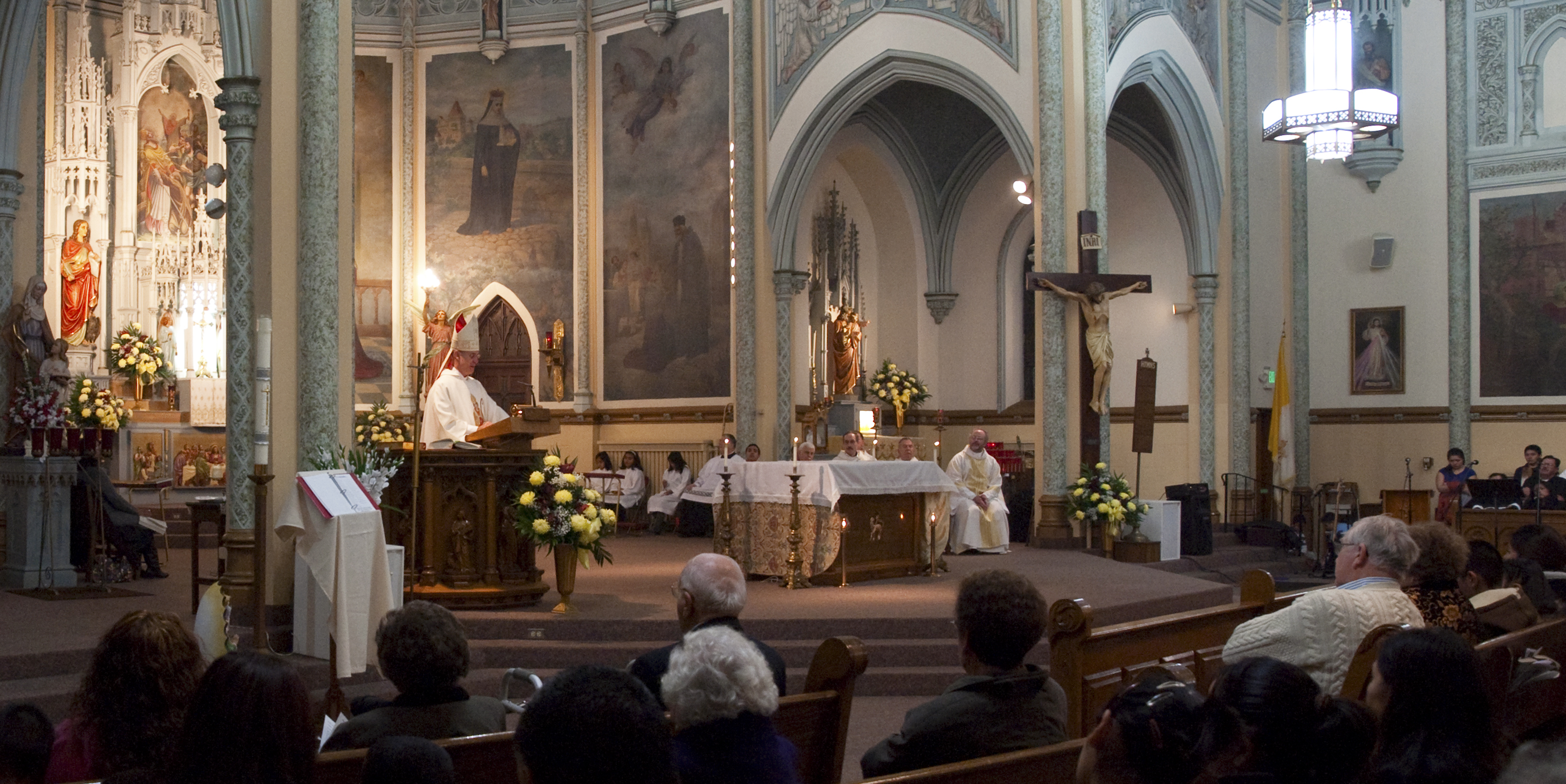
Most Rev. Kevin C. Rhoades preaches during the Centennial Mass at St. Adalbert Parish on November 7, 2010.

With the retirement of Sr. Dian Majsterek, SSJ-TOF, a lay principal was appointed for the first time in parish history. The school, troubled with financial issues and declining enrollment, had a resurrection with the combined parishes. Enrollment in 2003 was just 93 children, but, by 2010, enrollment had risen to 185 students.

On July 1, 2010, Rev. Peter J. Pacini, C.S.C. became pastor of St. Adalbert Parish. The Parish celebrated its centennial on Nov. 7, 2010 with a multilingual mass celebrated by Most Rev. Kevin C. Rhoades and followed by a festive dinner. On July 1, 2016, Rev. Paul M. Ybarra, C.S.C. became pastor of St. Adalbert Parish followed by Rev. Ryan Pietrocarlo C.S.C in 2020.

== Interior ==
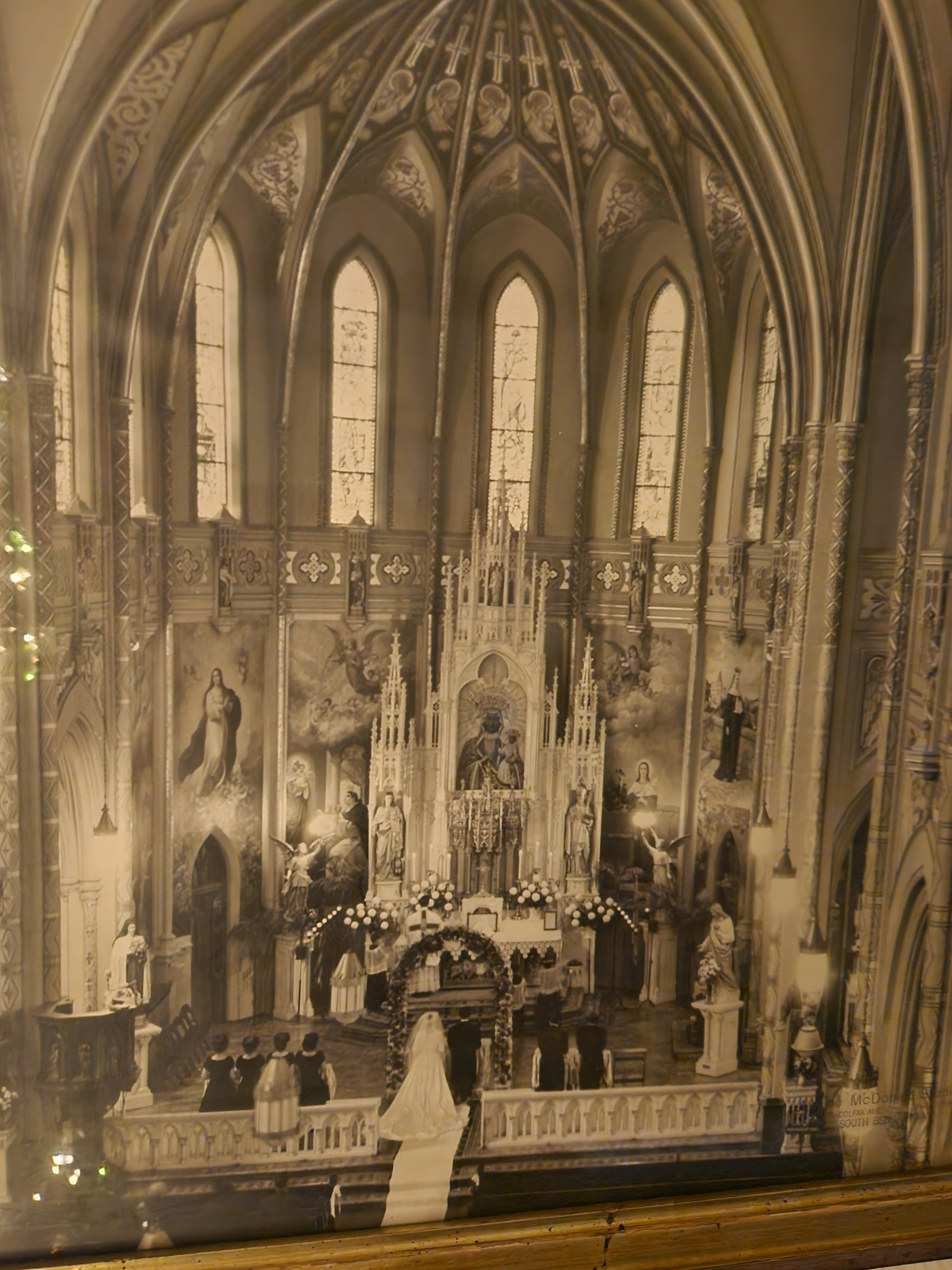
The church of Saint Adalbert in the 1950s. Note, the pulpit has had its seashell over it removed.

The interior was decorated and financed later than the building itself, as was the case for many churches of the time. In 1941, the pastor, Rev. Aloysius Jarka, hired John A. Mallin to decorate the church. Rev. Jarka died in 1943, however, he is seen in the original photos of the completed murals standing next to Mallin. The painted works included the North and South Walls of the church, and six murals in the sanctuary surrounding the high altar. Stenciling above the altar and the murals can also be seen in the 1941 photos. The total cost of the ten murals was $15,000.

The mural on the North wall of the church epitomizes the humble but determined beginnings of the church. In the mural, Polish immigrants are shown constructing and beating their swords into plowshares. Industrial development can be seen in the form of factories in the distance and above the whole scene the people's pastor is pointing to a cloud with the fallen Christ under his heavy cross struggling along. This struggle of Christ exemplifies what the Polish people have endured in establishing St. Adalbert's. Above the picture of Christ is a Polish inscription which is translated "By the sweat of your brow you have received the bread of life."

The murals in the sanctuary depict the Immaculate Conception and classic saints of Poland commonly depicted at the time: St. Andrew Bobola, a Jesuit martyred by the Russian Cossacks during the fights for Polish independence in the 18th century, and canonized as a saint in 1938, St. Hyacinth, St. Casimir, St. Hedwige, and Saint John Cantius. Murals in the rear section of the church depict St. John the Baptist, which at on point was the baptistery and is now a confessional font, and St. Stanislaus Kostka.

Currently, there are plans for a complete renovation of the church in the interior and exterior. All that is available currently are renderings of the completed product from the parish website.

== Pastors ==
- Rev. John Kubacki (1910–1920)
- Msgr. John W. Osadnik (1920–1940)
- Rev. Aloysius Jarka (1940–1943)
- Rev. Joe Zielinski (administrator) (1943–1944)
- Msgr. Ignatius J. Gapczynski (1944–1964)
- Rev. Eugene Kazmierczak (administrator) (1964)
- Rev. John Moskal (1964–1972)
- Rev. Eugene Kazmierczak (1972–1992)
- Rev. Leonard F. Chrobot (1992–1995)
- Rev. Daryl Rybicki (1995–2002)
- Msgr. J. William Lester (administrator) (2002–2003)
- Rev. David J. Porterfield, C.S.C. (administrator) (2003–2004)
- Rev. Christopher W. Cox, C.S.C. (2004–2010)
- Rev. Peter J. Pacini, C.S.C. (2010–2016)
- Rev. Paul Ybarra, C.S.C. (2016–2020)
- Rev. Ryan Pietrocarlo, C.S.C. (2020–present)

== Bibliography ==
- Donald Stabrowski, C.S.C., "Holy Cross and the South Bend Polonia," IndianaProvince, Congregation of Holy Cross, Indiana Province Archives Center, 1991.
- The Official Catholic Directory in USA
