= St. Adalbert Parish, Hyde Park =

St. Adalbert Parish
- St. Adalbert Parish
- 42°15′7.9″N 71°07′50.4″W
- Location: 1450 River Street; Hyde Park, Massachusetts
- Country: United States
- Denomination: Roman Catholic

History
- Founded: 1913
- Founder: Polish immigrants
- Dedication: St. Adalbert

Architecture
- Architect: Harrison H. Atwood
- Closed: 2011

Administration
- Division: Vicariate II
- District: Central Pastoral Region
- Province: Boston
- Archdiocese: Boston

Clergy
- Archbishop: Cardinal Seán Patrick O'Malley OFM Conv

St. Adalbert Parish, in Hyde Park, Massachusetts, United States, was a Catholic parish designated for Polish immigrants in the Archdiocese of Boston. The church in 1450 River Street was closed in 2011 and is now New Hope Baptist Church.

The architect for the church was Harrison H. Atwood of Boston.

== Bibliography ==
- Our Lady of Czestochowa Parish - Centennial 1893-1993
- The Official Catholic Directory in USA

== See also ==
- Polish-American Roman Catholic parishes in New England
