= St. Adalbert's Parish (Providence, Rhode Island) =

Coordinates: 41°49′29.4″N 71°26′44″W

St. Adalbert Parish
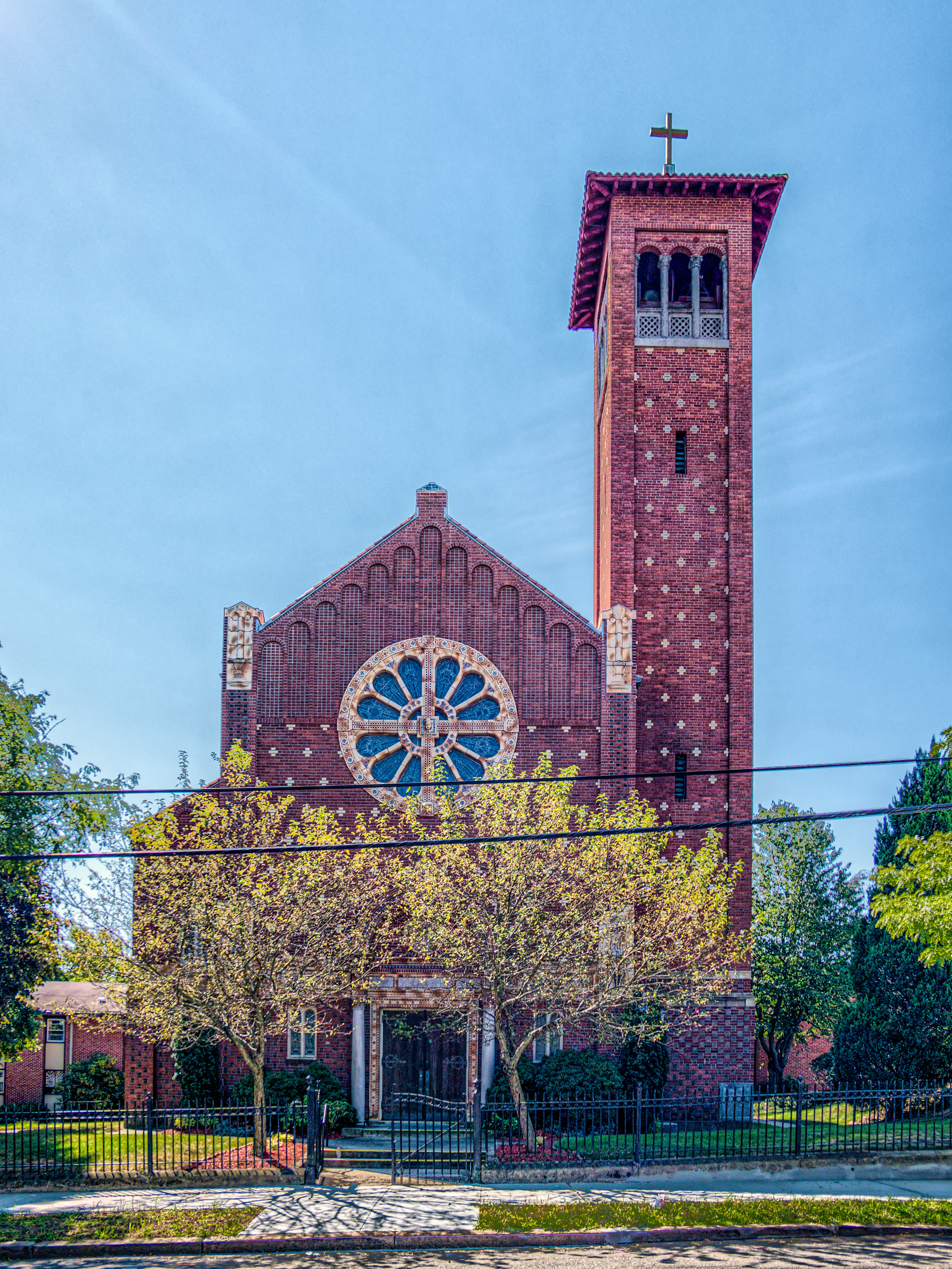
- St. Adalbert Parish
- Location: 866 Atwells Avenue; Providence, Rhode Island
- Country: United States
- Denomination: Roman Catholic
- Website: Parish website

History
- Founded: 1902
- Founder: Polish immigrants
- Dedication: St. Adalbert

Administration
- Province: Hartford
- Diocese: Providence

Clergy
- Bishop(s): Most Rev. Thomas J. Tobin, D.D.
- Pastor: Rev. Marek S. Kupka

St. Adalbert Parish is a church designated for Polish immigrants in Providence, Rhode Island, United States.

== History ==
The parish was founded in 1902. It is one of the oldest Polish-American Roman Catholic parishes in New England in the Diocese of Providence.

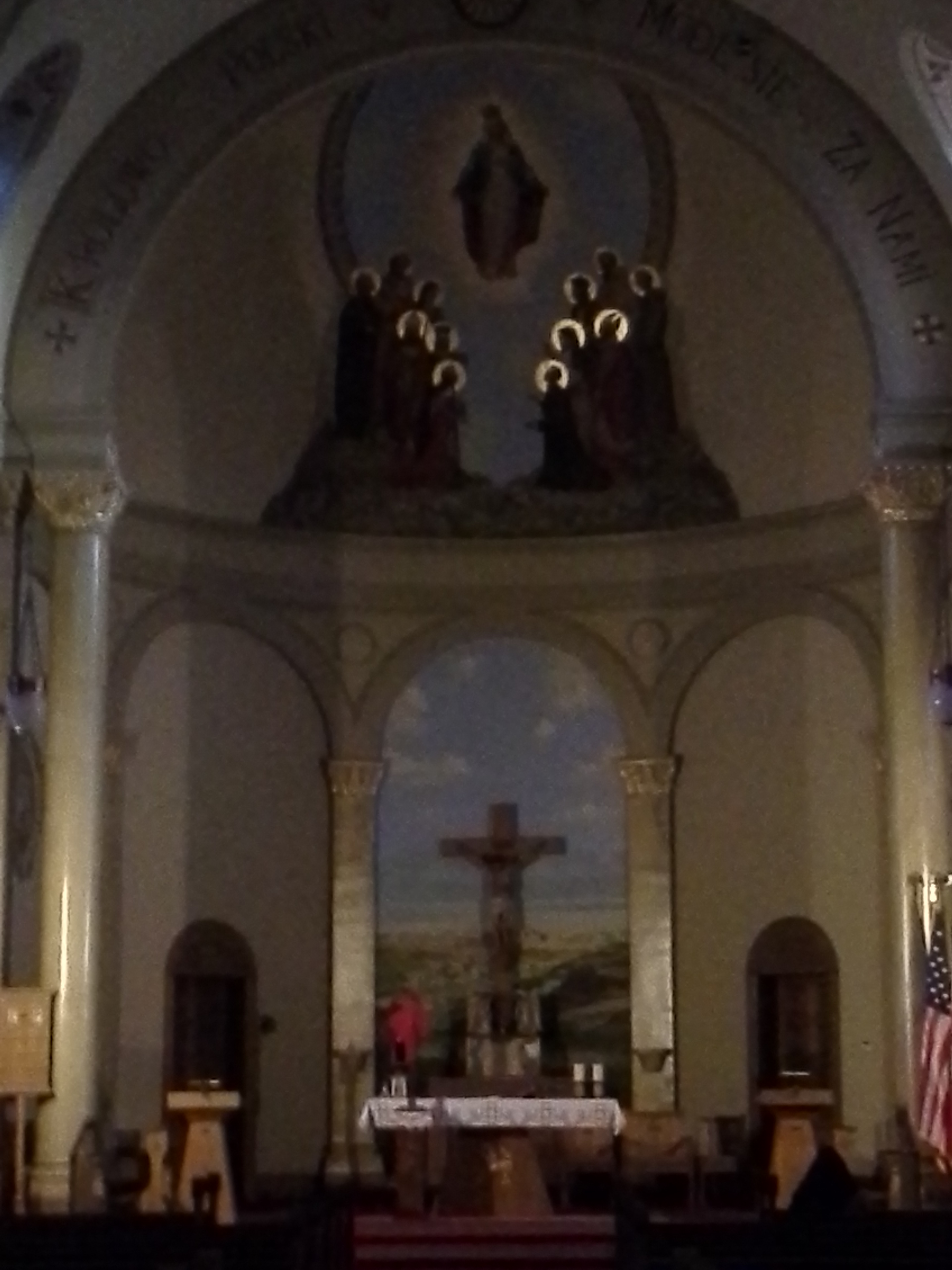
Interior

== Building ==
The church was designed by the eminent architect Henry F. Ludorf of Hartford, CT.

== See also ==
- Catholic Church in the United States
- Catholic parish church
- Index of Catholic Church articles
- Pastoral care

== Bibliography ==
- Kruszka, Waclaw (1998). A History of the Poles in America to 1908; Part III: Poles in the Eastern and Southern States. Washington, D.C.: The Catholic University of America Press.
- The 150th Anniversary of Polish-American Pastoral Ministry. Webster, Massachusetts: St. Joseph Basilica. September 11, 2005.
- A short parish history from the 1957 Jubilee Book - St. Joseph Parish - Central Falls RI. the internet Polish Genealogical Source. 1957.
- The Official Catholic Directory in USA

Ludorf, Henry F. "AIA Architect Roster Questionnaire, 1946" (PDF). Archived from the original (PDF) on 13 August 2011.
