= Historical list of the Catholic bishops of the United States =

This is a historical list of all bishops of the Catholic Church whose sees were within the present-day boundaries of the United States, with links to the bishops who consecrated them. It includes only members of the United States Conference of Catholic Bishops and their predecessors.

The number references the sequence of consecration. "Diocese" refers to the diocese over which the bishop presided or, if he did not preside, the diocese in which he served as coadjutor bishop or auxiliary bishop. The Roman numeral before the diocese name represents where in the sequence that bishop falls; e.g., the fourth bishop of Philadelphia is written "IV Philadelphia". Where a diocese is in bold type it indicates that the bishop is the current bishop of that diocese. Titular sees are not listed. Under consecrators are the numbers (or letters) referencing previous bishops on the list. The number listed first represents the principal consecrator. If a series of letters is under "Consecrators", then the consecrators were bishops from outside the United States (the list of foreign sees is at the bottom of the page). Where the letter "F" is used, it indicates that a priest who was not a bishop assisted in the consecration.

== Chart of episcopal succession ==
- (†) Saint
- (#) Venerable
- (¤) Servant of God
- (*) Cardinal
- (‡) Current Diocesan bishop
- (&) Current Coadjutor bishop
- Current Auxiliary bishop
- (°) Nuncio to the United States

=== 1–50 ===
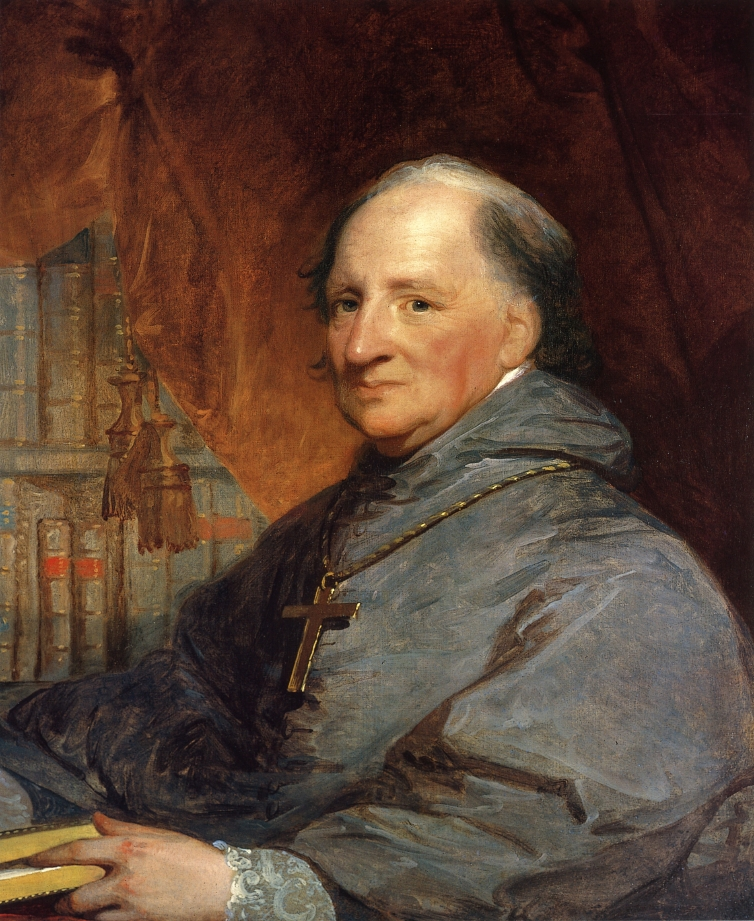
John Carroll (1) became the first American bishop in 1790.

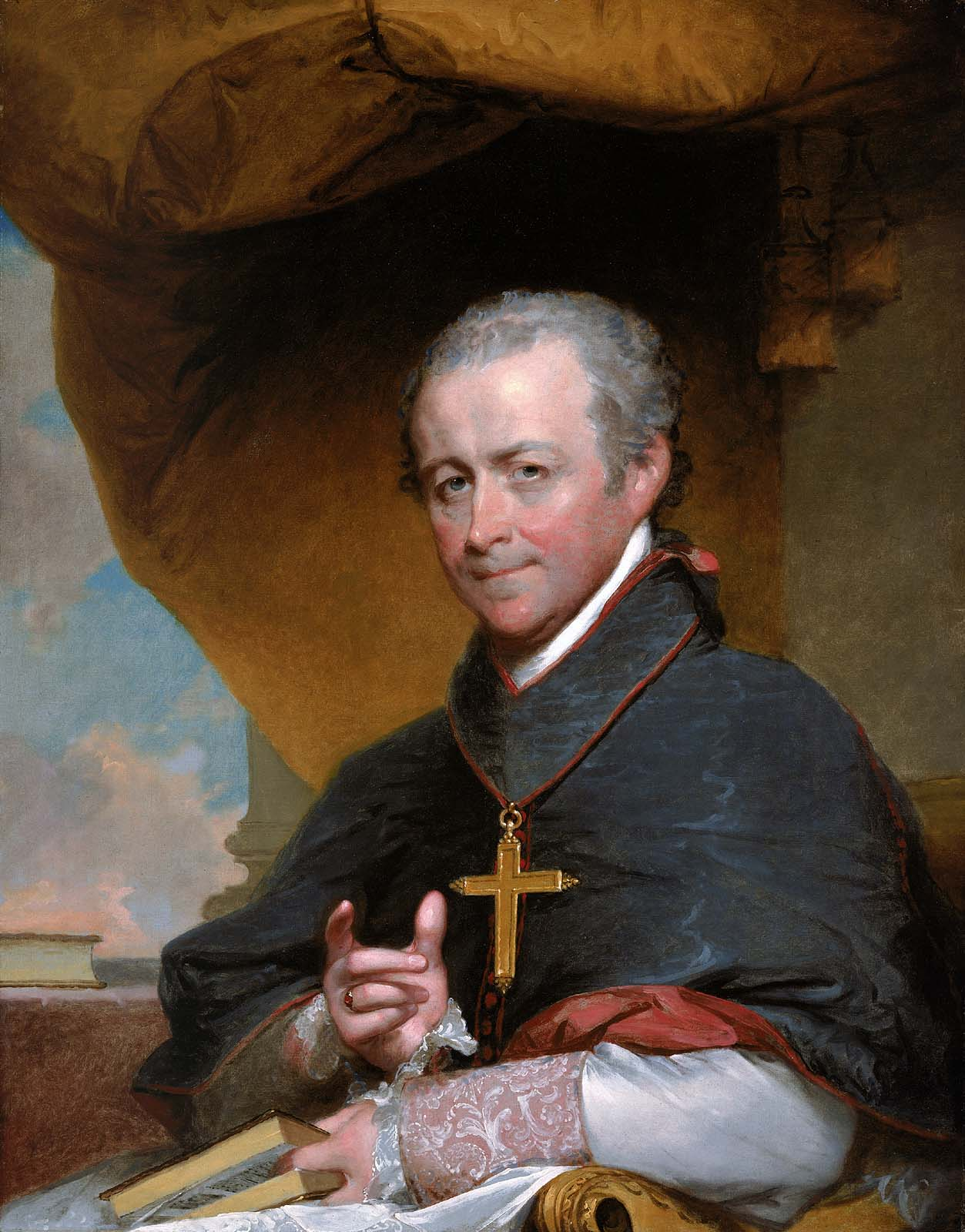
Portrait of Jean-Louis Lefebvre de Cheverus by Gilbert Stuart. Jean-Louis Lefebvre de Cheverus (7) was the first bishop of Boston, and became a cardinal after he returned to France.

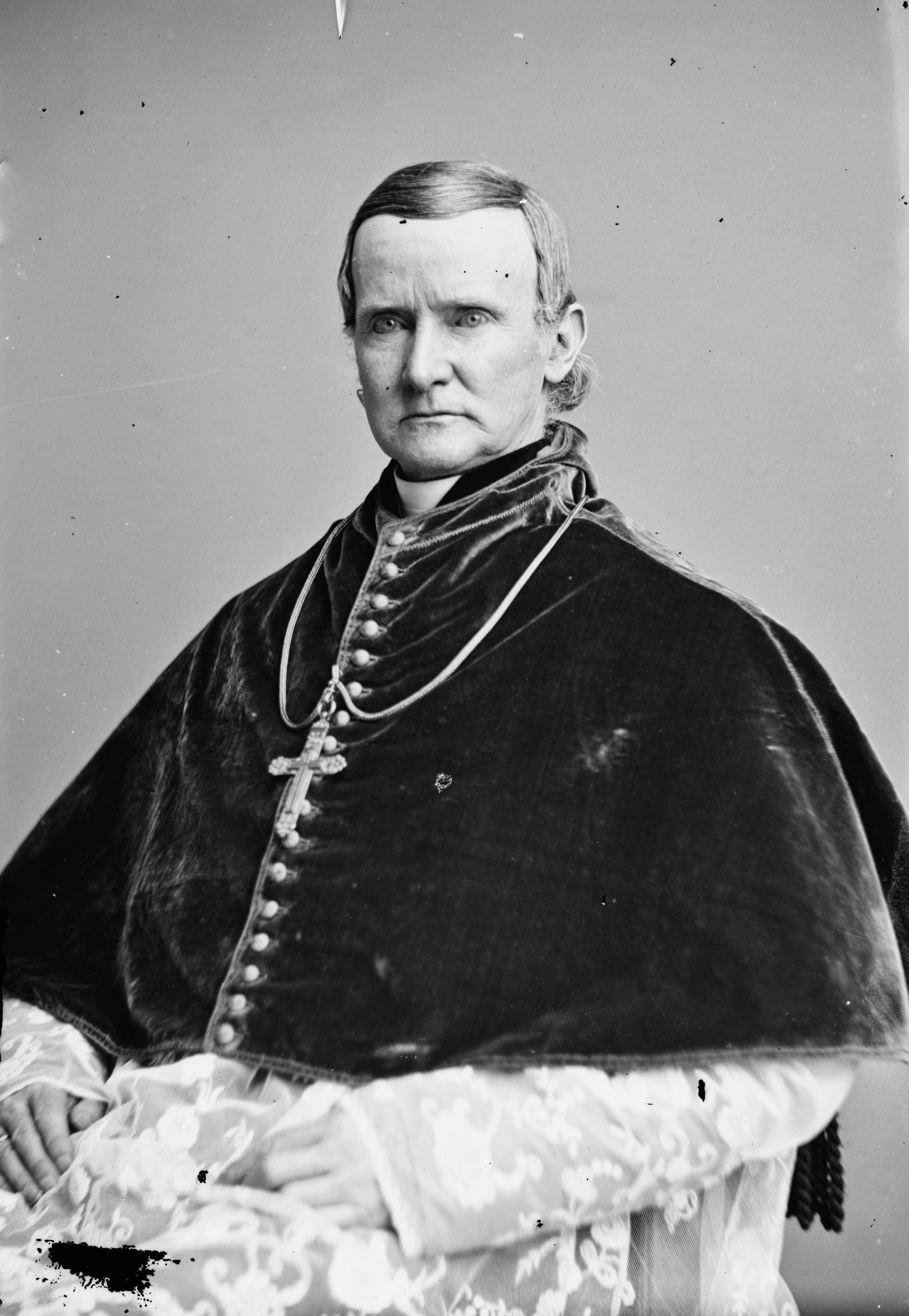
John McCloskey (42) was Archbishop of New York and became the first American cardinal in 1875.

No.	Bishop	Consecrators	Year	Diocese
1	John Carroll	AA1 F1 F2 (Note: Although three bishops are typically required for ordination, the Pope may issue a dispensation when co-consecrators are unavailable. See Canon 1014.)	1790	I Baltimore
2	Luis Peñalver y Cárdenas	PR33 AB1 AC1	1795	I Louisiana and the Two Floridas (Note: Later renamed New Orleans)
3	Leonard Neale	1 F3 F4	1800	II Baltimore
4	Francisco Porró y Reinado	AD1 AE1 AF1	1801	II Louisiana and the Two Floridas
5	Richard Luke Concanen	AG1 AH1 AI1	1808	I New York
6	Michael Francis Egan	1 F5 F6	1810	I Philadelphia
7	Jean-Louis de Cheverus* (Note: Became a cardinal only after he was assigned to a diocese outside the United States.)	1 3 6	1810	I Boston
8	Benedict Joseph Flaget	1 6 7	1810	I Bardstown (Note: Later renamed Louisville)
9	John Connolly	AJ1 AE2 AK1	1814	II New York
10	Louis William Valentine Dubourg	AL1 AM1 AN1	1815	III Louisiana and the Two Floridas
11	Ambrose Maréchal	7 9 F7	1817	III Baltimore
12	John B.M. David	5 F8 F9	1817	II Bardstown
13	Patrick Kelly	AO1 AO2 AP1	1817	I Richmond
14	John England	AQ1 AP1 13	1820	I Charleston
15	Henry Conwell	AR1 F10 F11	1820	II Philadelphia
16	Edward Fenwick	8 F9 F12	1822	I Cincinnati
17	Joseph Rosati	10 F13 F14	1824	New Orleans (coadjutor), I St. Louis
18	Benedict Joseph Fenwick	11 14 15	1825	II Boston
19	John Dubois	11 15 F15	1826	III New York
20	Michael Portier	17 F16 F17	1826	I Mobile
21	James Whitfield	8 15 19	1828	IV Baltimore
22	Francis Kenrick	8 12 15	1830	III Philadelphia, VI Baltimore
23	Leo Raymond de Neckère	17 20 F18	1830	IV New Orleans
24	Frederick Rese	17 F19 F20	1833	I Detroit
25	John Baptist Purcell	21 19 22	1833	II Cincinnati
26	Guy Ignatius Chabrat	8 12 F21	1834	Bardstown (coadjutor)
27	Samuel Eccleston	21 8 22	1834	V Baltimore
28	Simon Bruté	8 17 25	1834	I Vincennes (Note: Later renamed Indianapolis)
29	William Clancy	AS1 AT1 AP2	1834	Charleston (coadjutor)
30	Antoine Blanc	17 20 25	1835	V New Orleans
31	Mathias Loras	20 30 F22	1837	I Dubuque
32	John Joseph Hughes	19 8 22	1838	IV New York
33	Richard Pius Miles	17 28 26	1838	I Nashville
34	Célestine de la Hailandière	AU1 AV1 AW1	1839	II Vincennes
35	Francisco Diego y Moreno	AX1 AY1 AZ1	1840	I Two Californias (Note: Later renamed Monterey in California)
36	John J. Chanche	27 18 32	1841	I Natchez (Note: Later renamed Jackson)
37	Richard Vincent Whelan	27 18 32	1841	II Richmond, I Wheeling (Note: Later renamed Wheeling-Charleston)
38	Peter Paul Lefevere	22 14 32	1841	Detroit (coadjutor)
39	Peter Richard Kenrick	17 22 38	1841	II St. Louis
40	Jean-Marie Odin	30 20 36	1842	I Galveston, (Note: Later renamed Galveston-Houston) VI New Orleans
41	Michael O'Connor	BA1 BB1 BC1	1843	I Pittsburgh, I Erie
42	John McCloskey*	32 18 37	1844	I Albany, V New York
43	William Quarter	32 18 37	1844	I Chicago
44	Andrew Byrne	32 18 37	1844	I Little Rock
45	William Tyler	18 37 44	1844	I Hartford
46	Ignatius A. Reynolds	25 33 41	1844	II Charleston
47	John Henni	25 33 41	1844	I Milwaukee
48	John Bernard Fitzpatrick	18 37 45	1844	III Boston
49	François Norbert Blanchet	BD1 BE1 BE2	1845	I Oregon City (Note: Later renamed Portland in Oregon)
50	Augustin-Magloire Blanchet	BD1 BE1 BF1	1846	I Nesqually (Note: Later renamed Seattle)

=== 51–100 ===
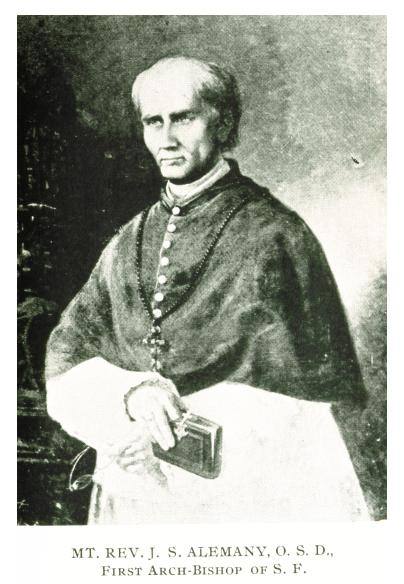
Joseph Sadoc Alemany (58) was the first bishop of San Francisco.

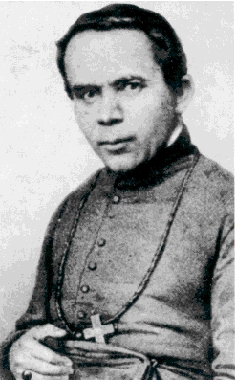
John Neumann (65) was bishop of Philadelphia and the only American bishop to be canonized.

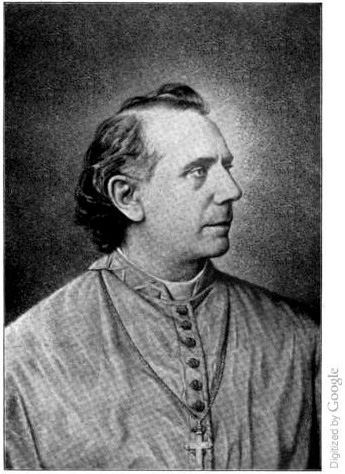
Patrick Feehan (98) was bishop of Chicago when the diocese was elevated to an archdiocese.

No.	Bishop	Consecrators	Year	Diocese
51	Louis Amadeus Rappe	25 37 F23	1847	I Cleveland
52	John Timon	32 42 BG1	1847	St. Louis (coadjutor), I Buffalo
53	John Stephen Bazin	20 25 34	1847	III Vincennes
54	Louis Désiré Maigret	BH1 F24 F25	1847	I Vicar Apostolic of the Hawaiian Islands
55	Martin John Spalding	8 22 33	1848	III Louisville, VII Baltimore
56	Jacques-Maurice de Saint Palais	33 55 F26	1849	IV Vincennes
57	John Oliver van de Velde	39 31 33	1849	II Chicago, II Natchez
58	Joseph Sadoc Alemany	BA1 AG2 BI1	1850	II Monterey, I San Francisco
59	Bernard O'Reilly	52 42 48	1850	II Hartford
60	Francis Xavier Gartland	27 22 41	1850	I Savannah
61	John McGill	39 33 55	1850	III Richmond
62	Jean-Baptiste Lamy	55 51 56	1850	I Santa Fe
63	Joseph Crétin	BJ1 BK1 BJ2	1851	I St. Paul of Minnesota (Note: Later renamed Saint Paul and Minneapolis)
64	John Baptist Miège	39 56 57	1851	I Vicar Apostolic of Kansas (Note: Later renamed Kansas City in Kansas)
65	John Neumann†	22 59 F27	1852	IV Philadelphia
66	James Roosevelt Bayley	BL1 42 51	1853	I Newark, VIII Baltimore
67	John Loughlin	BL1 42 51	1853	I Brooklyn
68	Louis de Goesbriand¤	BL1 42 51	1853	I Burlington
69	George Aloysius Carrell	25 38 47	1853	I Covington
70	Frederic Baraga^{#}	25 38 47	1853	I Sault Sainte Marie (Note: Later renamed Marquette)
71	Augustus Marie Martin	30 20 57	1853	I Natchitoches (Note: Later renamed Alexandria in Louisiana)
72	Thaddeus Amat y Brusi	BA1 BM1 BN1	1854	III Monterey
73	Joshua Maria Young	25 51 55	1854	II Erie
74	Ignatius Persico*	BO1 F28 F29	1854	IV Savannah
75	Anthony O'Regan	39 47 57	1854	III Chicago
76	David William Bacon	32 48 67	1855	I Portland in Maine
77	James Frederick Wood	25 37 65	1857	V Philadelphia
78	Henry Damian Juncker	25 47 73	1857	I Alton (Note: Later renamed Springfield in Illinois)
79	William Henry Elder	22 61 77	1857	III Natchez, III Cincinnati
80	Clement Smyth	39 47 75	1857	II Dubuque
81	James Duggan	39 47 75	1857	St. Louis (coadjutor), IV Chicago
82	John Barry	22 20 65	1857	II Savannah
83	John Henry Luers	25 56 69	1858	I Fort Wayne (Note: Later renamed Fort Wayne-South Bend)
84	Francis Patrick McFarland	32 48 52	1858	III Hartford
85	Patrick Neeson Lynch	22 20 82	1858	III Charleston
86	Augustin Verot	22 61 82	1858	III Savannah, I St. Augustine
87	James Myles O'Gorman	39 64 78	1858	I Vicar Apostolic of Nebraska
88	James Whelan	39 64 78	1858	II Nashville
89	Thomas Langton Grace	39 33 81	1859	II Saint Paul
90	John Quinlan	30 77 79	1859	II Mobile
91	Pierre Dufal	BP1 BQ1 34	1860	Galveston (coadjutor)
92	Michael Domenec	22 37 73	1860	II Pittsburgh, I Allegheny
93	Eugene O'Connell	AO3 AP3 AS2	1861	I Grass Valley
94	Sylvester Horton Rosecrans	25 55 83	1862	Cincinnati (auxiliary), I Columbus
95	Claude Marie Dubuis	40 BR1 BS1	1862	II Galveston
96	Peter Joseph Lavialle	25 56 61	1865	IV Louisville
97	John Joseph Conroy	42 52 67	1865	II Albany
98	Patrick Feehan	39 64 78	1865	III Nashville, V Chicago
99	John Joseph Williams	42 67 97	1866	IV Boston
100	John Hennessy	39 47 81	1866	III Dubuque

=== 101–150 ===
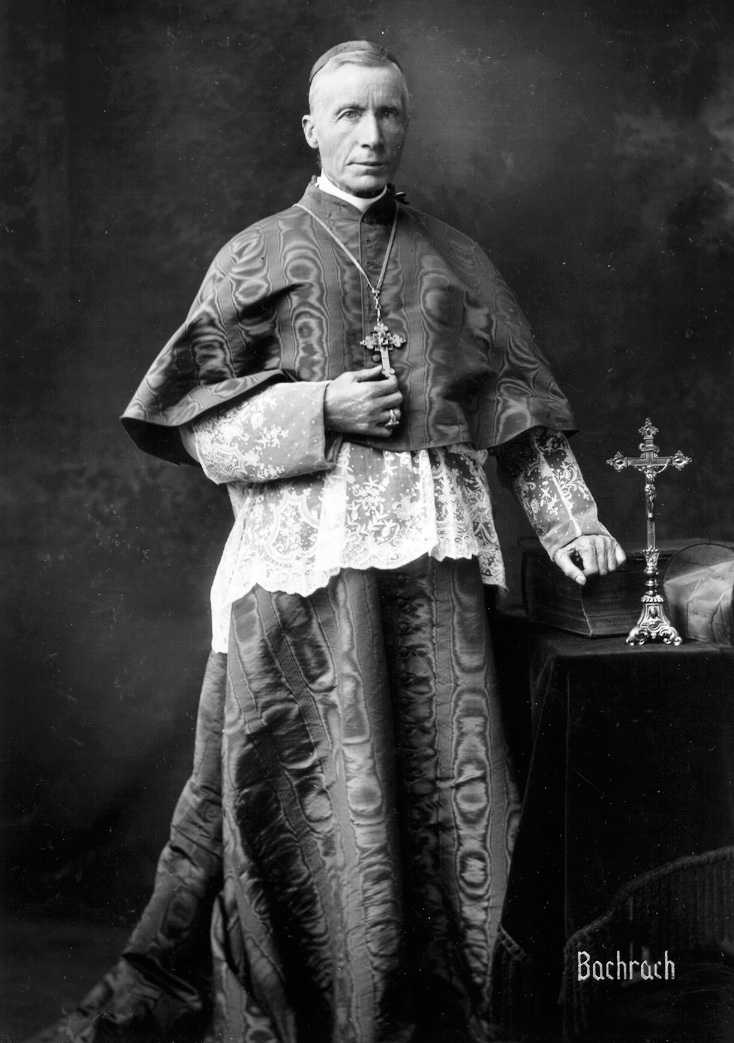
James Gibbons (109) became the United States' second cardinal in 1886.

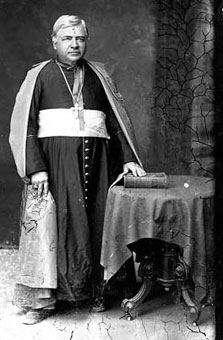
Jean-Baptiste Salpointe (116) served as vicar apostolic of the Arizona missions, and later as Archbishop of Santa Fe.

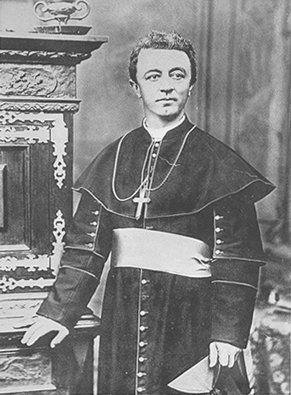
James Augustine Healy (138) was the first bishop of African descent in the United States.

No.	Bishop	Consecrators	Year	Diocese
101	Edward Fitzgerald	25 BR2 94	1867	II Little Rock
102	William George McCloskey	BT1 BU1 BV1	1868	V Louisville
103	Bernard John McQuaid	42 66 68	1868	I Rochester
104	Joseph Melcher	39 47 78	1868	I Green Bay
105	Jeremiah Francis Shanahan	77 61 92	1868	I Harrisburg
106	William O'Hara	77 79 85	1868	I Scranton
107	Tobias Mullen	92 51 77	1868	III Erie
108	Louis Aloysius Lootens	58 72 93	1868	I Vicar Apostolic of Idaho
109	James Gibbons*	55 85 92	1868	I Vicar Apostolic of North Carolina, IV Richmond, IX Baltimore
110	Thomas A. A. Becker	55 37 61	1868	I Wilmington, VI Savannah
111	Joseph Projectus Machebeuf	25 51 68	1868	I Denver
112	Michael Heiss	47 38 89	1868	I La Crosse, II Milwaukee
113	John Joseph Hogan	39 64 98	1868	I Saint Joseph, I Kansas City (Note: Later renamed Kansas City-Saint Joseph)
114	Stephen Vincent Ryan	42 67 BR2	1868	II Buffalo
115	Ignatius Mrak	25 38 47	1869	II Sault Sainte Marie
116	Jean-Baptiste Salpointe	BW1 95 BX1	1869	Vicar Apostolic of Arizona, (Note: Later renamed Tucson) II Santa Fe
117	Augustus Toebbe	94 83 102	1870	II Covington
118	Peter Joseph Baltes	83 117 F30	1870	II Alton
119	Thomas Patrick Roger Foley	102 94 110	1870	Chicago (coadjutor)
120	Caspar Henry Borgess	94 83 98	1870	II Detroit
121	Napoléon-Joseph Perché	94 98 119	1870	VII New Orleans
122	Patrick Thomas O'Reilly	42 97 99	1870	I Springfield in Massachusetts
123	Louis Mary Fink	119 64 104	1871	I Leavenworth
124	Patrick John Ryan	39 98 104	1872	St. Louis (coadjutor), VI Philadelphia
125	Joseph Gregory Dwenger	25 117 120	1872	II Fort Wayne
126	Richard Gilmour	25 117 120	1872	II Cleveland
127	Francis McNeirny	42 67 76	1872	III Albany
128	Thomas Francis Hendricken	42 76 99	1872	I Providence
129	Edgar P. P. Wadhams	42 68 99	1872	I Ogdensburg
130	William Hickley Gross	66 109 110	1873	V Savannah, III Oregon City
131	Michael Corrigan	42 67 102	1873	II Newark, VI New York
132	Charles John Seghers	49 50 BY1	1873	II Oregon City
133	Francisco Mora y Borrell	72 58 93	1873	IV Monterey-Los Angeles
134	Anthony Dominic Pellicer	121 101 109	1874	I San Antonio
135	Dominic Manucy	121 79 95	1874	I Vicar Apostolic of Brownsville, (Note: Later renamed Corpus Christi) III Mobile
136	John Joseph Kain	66 109 110	1875	II Wheeling, III St. Louis
137	Rupert Seidenbusch	112 123 125	1875	I Vicar Apostolic of Northern Minnesota (Note: Later renamed Saint Cloud)
138	James Augustine Healy	99 122 127	1875	II Portland in Maine
139	Francis Xavier Krautbauer	47 89 112	1875	II Green Bay
140	John Ireland	89 112 137	1875	III Saint Paul
141	Thomas Galberry	99 122 129	1876	IV Hartford
142	John Tuigg	77 92 107	1876	III Pittsburgh
143	James O'Connor	124 105 106	1876	I Omaha
144	Francis Xavier Leray	BZ1 34 CA1	1877	II Natchitoches, VIII New Orleans
145	John Lancaster Spalding	42 109 119	1877	I Peoria
146	John Moore	85 110 130	1877	II St. Augustine
147	Silas Chatard	CB1 CC1 CD1	1878	V Vincennes
148	John Joseph Keane	109 119 136	1878	V Richmond, IV Dubuque
149	Lawrence Stephen McMahon	99 67 122	1879	V Hartford
150	John Vertin	112 120 145	1879	III Sault Sainte Marie

=== 151–200 ===
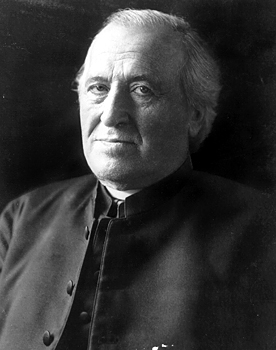
John Ireland (140) was the first Archbishop of Saint Paul and a friend of Presidents William McKinley and Theodore Roosevelt.

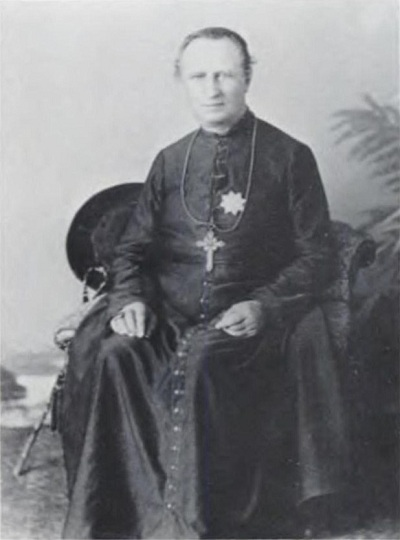
Herman Koeckemann (159) was vicar apostolic to the Hawaiian Islands.

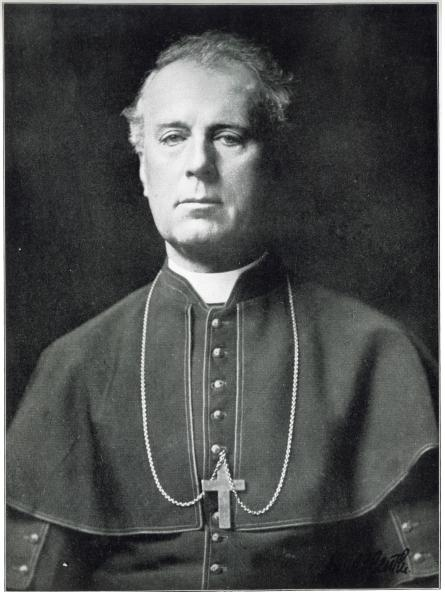
Patrick William Riordan (167) was Archbishop of San Francisco during the 1906 earthquake.

No.	Bishop	Consecrators	Year	Diocese
151	Egidius Junger	49 50 F31	1879	II Nesqually
152	Jean-Baptiste Brondel	132 151 BY1	1879	I Helena
153	Martin Marty	147 137 F32	1880	I Sioux Falls, III Saint Cloud
154	John Ambrose Watterson	79 102 142	1881	II Columbus
155	Patrick Manogue	58 93 133	1881	II Grass Valley, I Sacramento
156	Francis Janssens	109 110 148	1881	IV Natchez, IX New Orleans
157	John Claude Neraz	101 95 135	1881	II San Antonio
158	John McMullen	98 100 145	1881	I Davenport
159	Herman Koeckemann	58 93 CE1	1881	II Vicar Apostolic of the Hawaiian Islands
160	Kilian Caspar Flasch	112 137 139	1881	II La Crosse
161	Winand Wigger	131 67 103	1881	III Newark
162	Michael Joseph O'Farrell	42 67 131	1881	I Trenton
163	Henry Pinckney Northrop	109 110 148	1882	II Vicar Apostolic of North Carolina, IV Charleston
164	Nicolaus Aloysius Gallagher	101 135 157	1882	III Galveston
165	Henry Richter	79 102 120	1883	I Grand Rapids
166	Joseph Rademacher	98 125 154	1883	IV Nashville, III Fort Wayne
167	Patrick William Riordan	98 102 147	1883	II San Francisco
168	Denis Mary Bradley	99 68 146	1884	I Manchester
169	Henry Cosgrove	98 100 143	1884	II Davenport
170	Camillus Paul Maes	79 102 120	1885	III Covington
171	Anthony Durier	134 157 164	1885	III Natchitoches
172	Alphonse Joseph Glorieux	109 130 170	1885	I Boise
173	Peter Bourgade	62 111 116	1885	I Tucson, IV Santa Fe
174	Richard Phelan	124 105 107	1885	IV Pittsburgh
175	Jeremiah O'Sullivan	109 148 163	1885	IV Mobile
176	Frederick Katzer	112 140 150	1886	III Green Bay, III Milwaukee
177	Alfred Allen Paul Curtis	109 136 146	1886	II Wilmington, Baltimore (auxiliary)
178	Matthew Harkins	99 122 149	1887	II Providence
179	Patrick Anthony Ludden	131 103 127	1887	I Syracuse
180	Lawrence Scanlan	167 93 155	1887	I Salt Lake City
181	Maurice Francis Burke	98 102 169	1887	I Cheyenne, II Saint Joseph
182	Nicholas Chrysostom Matz	116 111 F33	1887	II Denver
183	Thomas Bonacum	39 123 143	1887	I Lincoln
184	Richard Scannell	98 102 166	1887	I Concordia, (Note: Later renamed Salina) II Omaha
185	Thomas McGovern	106 126 154	1888	II Harrisburg
186	John Janssen	98 113 123	1888	I Belleville
187	James Ryan	145 102 186	1888	III Alton
188	Leo Michael Haid	109 110 136	1888	III Vicar Apostolic of North Carolina
189	John Samuel Foley	109 67 129	1888	III Detroit
190	John Joseph Hennessy	39 100 123	1888	I Wichita
191	Thomas Heslin	156 101 171	1889	V Natchez
192	John J. F. O. Zardetti	130 CF1 CG1	1889	II Saint Cloud
193	Augustine van de Vyver	109 136 188	1889	VI Richmond
194	Joseph Bernard Cotter	140 89 153	1889	I Winona
195	James McGolrick	140 89 153	1889	I Duluth
196	John Shanley	140 89 153	1889	I Fargo
197	Peter Verdaguer y Prat	CH1 CI1 CJ1	1890	II Vicar Apostolic of Brownsville
198	Thomas Francis Brennan	107 174 185	1891	I Dallas
199	John Brady	99 122 178	1891	Boston (auxiliary)
200	Theophile Meerschaert	156 101 191	1891	I Oklahoma (Note: Later renamed Oklahoma City)

=== 201–250 ===
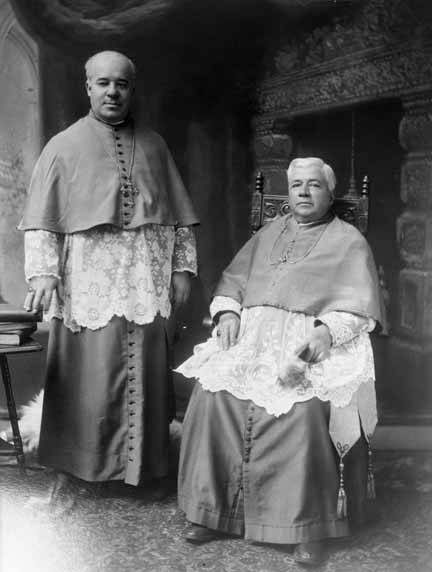
Archbishop Placide Louis Chapelle (201, at left) served as Apostolic Delegate to Cuba, Puerto Rico, and the Philippines after the Spanish–American War.

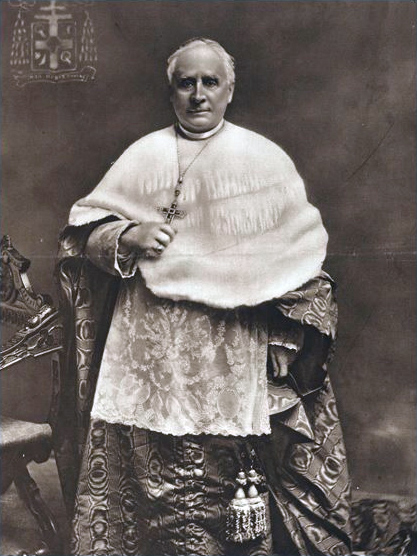
Archbishop John Murphy Farley (218) was created a cardinal in 1911.

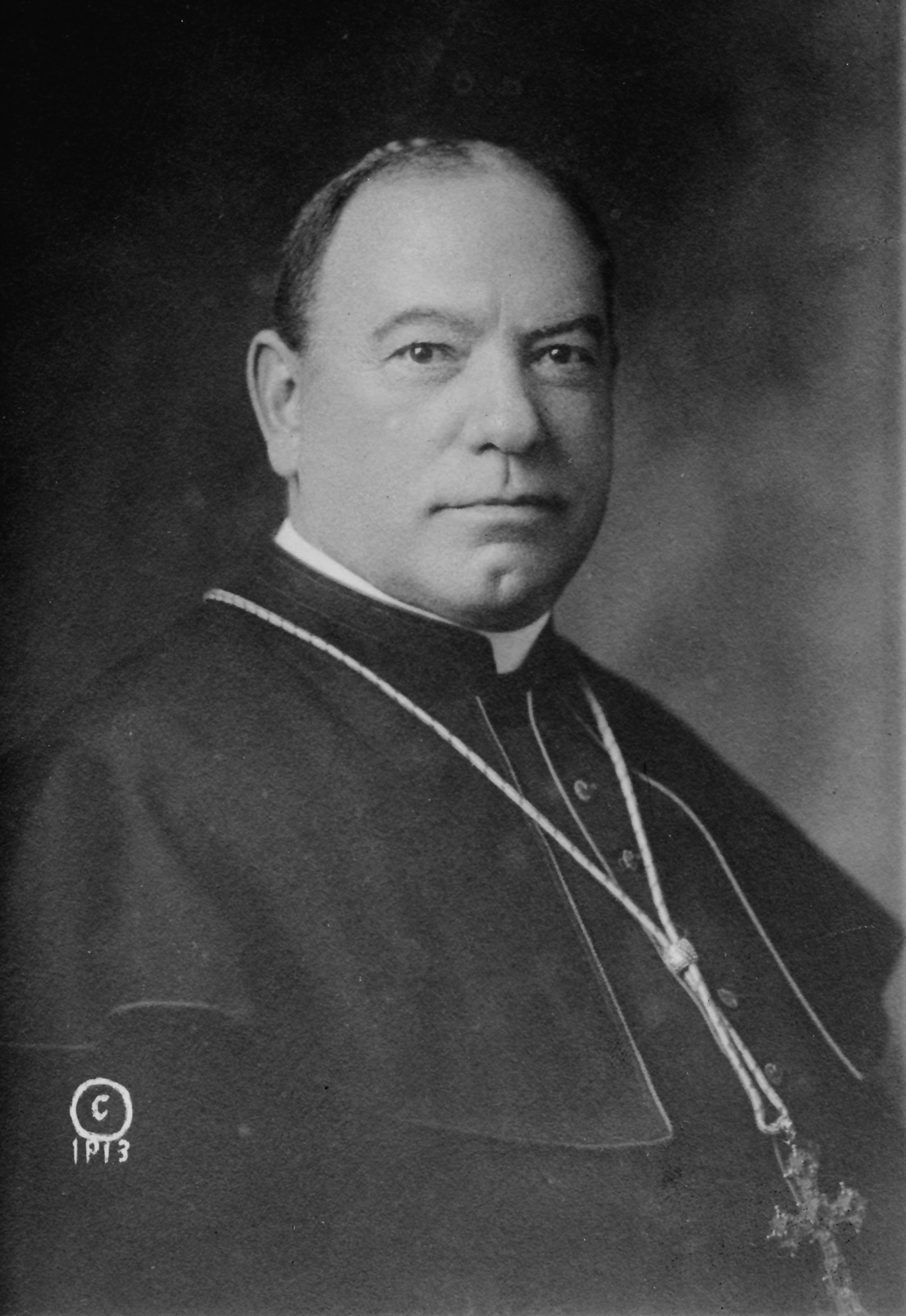
Archbishop William Henry O'Connell (244) was the first cardinal to be archbishop of Boston.

No.	Bishop	Consecrators	Year	Diocese
201	Placide Louis Chapelle	109 116 136	1891	III Santa Fe, X New Orleans
202	James Schwebach	176 186 194	1892	III La Crosse
203	Ignatius Frederick Horstmann	79 106 147	1892	III Cleveland
204	Sebastian Gebhard Messmer	192 148 161	1892	IV Green Bay, IV Milwaukee
205	Charles Edward McDonnell	131 103 147	1892	II Brooklyn
206	Henry Gabriels	131 127 179	1892	II Ogdensburg
207	John Stephen Michaud	99 168 206	1892	II Burlington
208	Gulstan Ropert	167 133 180	1892	III Vicar Apostolic of the Hawaiian Islands
209	Thomas Daniel Beaven	99 168 207	1892	II Springfield in Massachusetts
210	Edward Joseph Dunne	98 187 189	1893	II Dallas
211	Michael Tierney	99 178 209	1894	VI Hartford
212	George Thomas Montgomery	167 152 180	1894	V Monterey-Los Angeles, San Francisco (coadjutor)
213	Patrick James Donahue	109 188 189	1894	III Wheeling
214	Thomas M. A. Burke	131 103 179	1894	IV Albany
215	Thomas Sebastian Byrne	79 154 170	1894	V Nashville
216	James Augustine McFaul	131 103 205	1894	II Trenton
217	John Anthony Forest	156 101 164	1895	III San Antonio
218	John Murphy Farley*	131 205 206	1895	New York (auxiliary), VII New York
219	Michael John Hoban	CK1° 185 209	1896	II Scranton
220	Thomas O'Gorman	CK1° 148 153	1896	II Sioux Falls
221	Thomas Grace	167 180 212	1896	II Sacramento
222	John Joseph Glennon*	136 181 190	1896	Kansas City (coadjutor), IV St. Louis
223	Edward John O'Dea	130 CL1 172	1896	III Seattle
224	Edmond Francis Prendergast	124 203 219	1897	VII Philadelphia
225	James Edward Quigley	131 103 205	1897	III Buffalo, VI Chicago
226	Thomas Mathias Lenihan	100 169 183	1897	II Cheyenne
227	John James Joseph Monaghan	109 163 177	1897	III Wilmington
228	Edward Patrick Allen	109 101 178	1897	V Mobile
229	James Trobec	140 150 176	1897	IV Saint Cloud
230	John Edmund Fitzmaurice	124 203 224	1898	IV Erie
231	Alexander Christie	140 152 196	1898	IV Oregon City
232	John Francis Cunningham	136 183 190	1898	III Concordia
233	Gustave Augustin Rouxel	201 191 CM1	1899	New Orleans (auxiliary)
234	John Walter Shanahan	124 203 224	1899	III Harrisburg
235	Alexander Joseph McGavick	98 181 210	1899	Chicago (auxiliary), IV La Crosse
236	James Blenk (Note: Also #45 in the Puerto Rican historical succession of bishops.)	201 200 233	1899	XLV Puerto Rico, XI New Orleans
237	Frederick Eis	176 202 204	1899	IV Sault Sainte Marie
238	Denis O'Donaghue	79 189 215	1900	VI Louisville
239	Benjamin Joseph Keiley	109 163 227	1900	VII Savannah
240	Henry Regis Granjon	109 227 228	1900	II Tucson
241	Henry Moeller	79 165 215	1900	III Columbus, IV Cincinnati
242	Peter Joseph O'Reilly	AI2° 169 187	1900	Peoria (auxiliary)
243	Herman Joseph Alerding	79 238 241	1900	IV Fort Wayne
244	William Henry O'Connell*	CK1° CN1 CO1	1901	III Portland in Maine, V Boston
245	Peter Muldoon	AI2° 169 187	1901	Chicago (auxiliary), I Rockford
246	John Joseph O'Connor	131 205 216	1901	IV Newark
247	Eugene Augustine Garvey	AI2° 219 230	1901	I Altoona (Note: Later renamed Altoona-Johnstown)
248	Thomas James Conaty	109 170 209	1901	VI Monterey-Los Angeles
249	William John Kenny	109 188 239	1902	III St. Augustine
250	Philip Joseph Garrigan	209 228 248	1902	I Sioux City

=== 251–300 ===
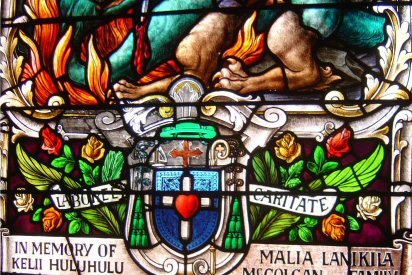
Episcopal arms of Bishop Libert H. Boeynaems (256), Vicar Apostolic of the Hawaiian Islands.

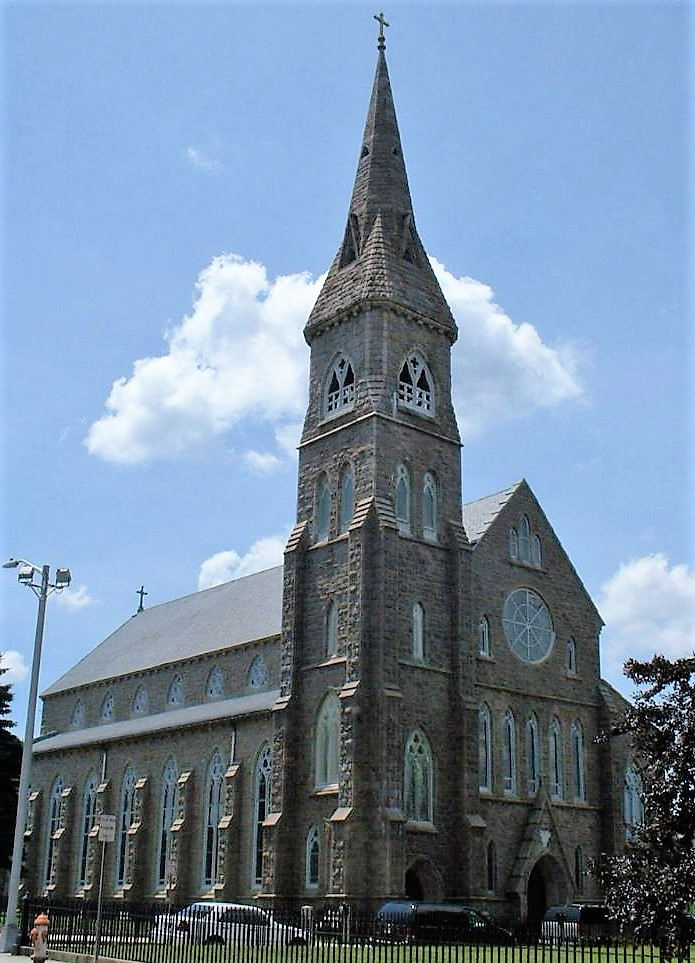
Bishop William Stang (263) was named the first bishop of Fall River in 1904 (cathedral pictured).

No.	Bishop	Consecrators	Year	Diocese
251	John Baptist Pitaval	173 182 240	1902	Santa Fe (auxiliary), V Santa Fe
252	John Stariha	140 194 195	1902	I Lead (Note: Later renamed Rapid City)
253	James Keane	140 194 195	1902	III Cheyenne, V Dubuque
254	Regis Canevin	124 188 234	1903	V Pittsburgh
255	Dennis Joseph Dougherty*	CK1° CP1 CQ1	1903	V Buffalo, VIII Philadelphia
256	Libert H. Boeynaems	212 221 248	1903	IV Vicar Apostolic of the Hawaiian Islands
257	Jeremiah James Harty	CK1° CR1 CS1	1903	III Omaha
258	Charles H. Colton	218 103 205	1903	IV Buffalo
259	Charles Joseph O'Reilly	231 172 223	1903	I Baker City, (Note: Later renamed Baker) III Lincoln
260	Bonaventure Broderick	201 CT1 F34	1903	New York (auxiliary)
261	James Joseph Hartley	241 238 243	1904	IV Columbus
262	Thomas Cusack	218 216 258	1904	New York (auxiliary), V Albany
263	William Stang	178 199 211	1904	I Fall River
264	Joseph John Fox	204 237 263	1904	V Green Bay
265	John Bernard Delany	CU1° 228 244	1904	II Manchester
266	Mathias Clement Lenihan	148 194 253	1904	I Great Falls (Note: Later renamed Great Falls-Billings)
267	James J. Davis	148 169 266	1904	III Davenport
268	Cornelius Van de Ven	201 191 233	1904	IV Alexandria
269	John Patrick Carroll	148 184 259	1904	II Helena
270	Thomas Francis Lillis	222 113 232	1904	II Leavenworth, II Kansas City
271	Thomas Francis Hickey	218 103 179	1905	II Rochester
272	Augustine Francis Schinner	CU1° 195 202	1905	I Superior, I Spokane
273	John Baptist Morris	215 164 228	1906	III Little Rock
274	Louis Sebastian Walsh	99 178 209	1906	IV Portland in Maine
275	George Albert Guertin	CU1° 178 211	1907	III Manchester
276	Soter Ortynsky	CV1 CW1 CX1	1907	I Philadelphia of the Ukrainians
277	Daniel Francis Feehan	209 178 211	1907	II Fall River
278	Thomas Francis Kennedy	CY1 167 CZ1	1907	Rector of the North American College
279	Joseph Maria Koudelka	203 261 264	1908	Cleveland (auxiliary), Milwaukee (auxiliary), II Superior
280	Denis J. O'Connell	109 163 241	1908	San Francisco (auxiliary), VII Richmond
281	Paul Peter Rhode	225 245 279	1908	Chicago (auxiliary), VI Green Bay
282	Owen Patrick Bernard Corrigan	109 181 239	1909	Baltimore (auxiliary)
283	John Patrick Farrelly	CY1 273 278	1909	IV Cleveland
284	John Grimes	218 179 214	1909	II Syracuse
285	Joseph Gaudentius Anderson	244 275 277	1909	Boston (auxiliary)
286	Edmund Michael Dunne	CU1° 186 245	1909	II Peoria
287	George Mundelein*	205 246 258	1909	Brooklyn (auxiliary), VII Chicago
288	John Joseph Nilan	244 274 277	1910	VII Hartford
289	Joseph John Rice	209 178 274	1910	III Burlington
290	John Shaw	236 228 268	1910	IV San Antonio, XII New Orleans
291	John Bernard MacGinley	CU1° 224 230	1910	VIII Monterey-Fresno
292	James O'Reilly	140 195 229	1910	II Fargo
293	John Jeremiah Lawler	140 195 229	1910	Saint Paul and Minneapolis (auxiliary), III Rapid City
294	Patrick Richard Heffron	140 195 229	1910	II Winona
295	Joseph Francis Busch	140 195 229	1910	II Lead, V Saint Cloud
296	John B. V. P. Wehrle	140 195 229	1910	I Bismarck
297	Timothy J. Corbett	140 195 229	1910	I Crookston
298	Joseph Chartrand	CU1° 238 243	1910	VI Indianapolis
299	Edward D. Kelly	109 165 170	1911	Detroit (auxiliary), III Grand Rapids
300	Joseph Schrembs	165 170 189	1911	Grand Rapids (auxiliary), I Toledo, V Cleveland

=== 301–350 ===
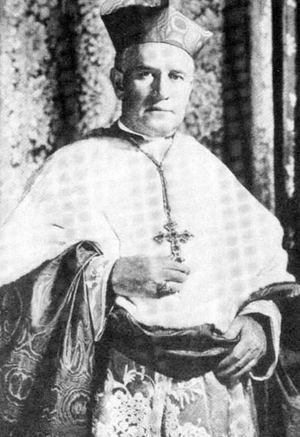
Patrick Joseph Hayes (316) was Cardinal and Archbishop of New York.

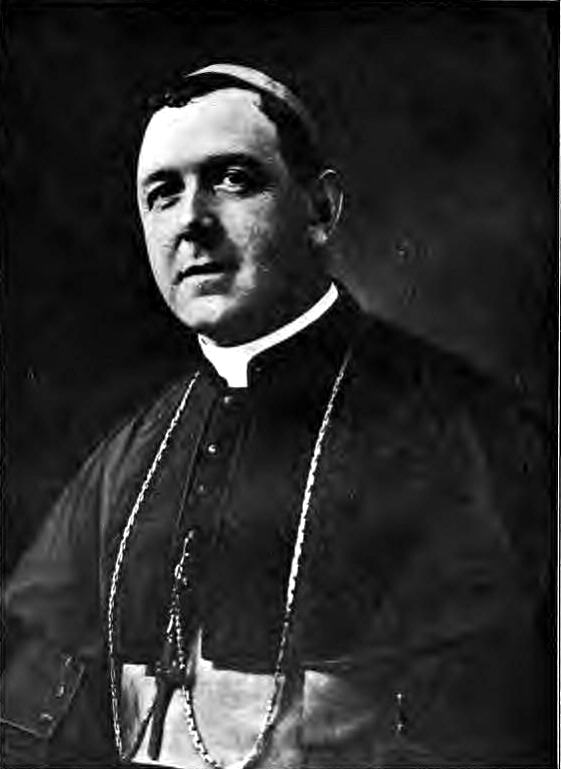
John Joseph Cantwell (327) was the first Archbishop of Los Angeles.

No.	Bishop	Consecrators	Year	Diocese
301	John Chamberlain Ward	CU1° 190 270	1911	III Leavenworth
302	John Henry Tihen	190 182 184	1911	II Lincoln, III Denver
303	Joseph Patrick Lynch	236 164 273	1911	III Dallas
304	John Edward Gunn	236 228 273	1911	VI Natchez
305	Jean Marie Laval	236 268 290	1911	New Orleans (auxiliary)
306	Patrick A. A. McGovern	253 184 250	1912	IV Cheyenne
307	Austin Dowling	178 267 274	1912	I Des Moines, IV Saint Paul
308	Joseph Henry Conroy	218 206 258	1912	Ogdensburg (auxiliary), III Ogdensburg
309	John Joseph McCort	224 230 234	1912	Philadelphia (auxiliary), II Altoona
310	Edward Joseph Hanna	BU2° 225 280	1912	San Francisco (auxiliary), III San Francisco
311	James Albert Duffy	253 184 306	1913	I Grand Island
312	Paul Joseph Nussbaum	BU2° 205 246	1913	I Corpus Christi, V Sault Sainte Marie and Marquette
313	Edward Kozłowski	204 DA1 165	1914	Milwaukee (auxiliary)
314	Henry J. Althoff	225 245 281	1914	II Belleville
315	Michael Joseph Curley	239 213 282	1914	IV St. Augustine, X Baltimore, I Washington
316	Patrick Joseph Hayes*	218 206 262	1914	New York (auxiliary), Vicar Apostolic for U.S. Armed Forces, VIII New York
317	Thomas Joseph Shahan	109 280 288	1914	Baltimore (auxiliary)
318	Thomas Francis Doran	178 274 307	1915	Providence (auxiliary)
319	Joseph Sarsfield Glass	310 221 270	1915	II Salt Lake City
320	Michael Gallagher	165 299 300	1915	III Grand Rapids, IV Detroit
321	Anthony Joseph Schuler	251 240 306	1915	I El Paso
322	Ferdinand Brossart	241 200 261	1916	IV Covington
323	Philip R. McDevitt	224 230 309	1916	IV Harrisburg
324	William Thomas Russell	109 227 282	1917	V Charleston
325	Joseph Raphael John Crimont	231 223 272	1917	I Vicar Apostolic of Alaska
326	Denis Matthew Lowney	209 277 288	1917	Providence (auxiliary)
327	John Joseph Cantwell	310 221 319	1917	VII Monterey-Los Angeles
328	John Mark Gannon	219 309 323	1918	Erie (auxiliary), V Erie
329	Daniel Mary Gorman	BU2° 266 319	1918	II Boise
330	Thomas Walsh	BU2° 246 255	1918	III Trenton, V Newark
331	John T. McNicholas	DB1 DC1 DD1	1918	II Duluth, V Cincinnati
332	Christopher Edward Byrne	222 270 273	1918	IV Galveston
333	Arthur Jerome Drossaerts	BU2° 200 305	1918	V San Antonio
334	Jules Jeanmard	BU2° 200 305	1918	I Lafayette in Louisiana
335	Edmund Gibbons	BU2° 284 330	1919	VI Albany
336	Joseph Francis McGrath	223 226 269	1919	II Baker City
337	William Turner	109 280 315	1919	VI Buffalo
338	Edmond Heelan	253 267 306	1919	Sioux City (auxiliary), II Sioux City
339	William A. Hickey	209 274 277	1919	III Providence
340	Albert Daeger	251 302 321	1919	VI Santa Fe
341	Thomas William Drumm	253 267 338	1919	II Des Moines
342	John Gregory Murray	BU2° 288 317	1919	Hartford (auxiliary), V Portland in Maine, V Saint Paul
343	Thomas Edmund Molloy	205 330 335	1920	Brooklyn (auxiliary), III Brooklyn
344	Patrick J. J. Keane	310 221 327	1920	Sacramento (auxiliary), III Sacramento
345	Francis Joseph Tief	270 245 302	1921	IV Concordia
346	Augustus John Schwertner	300 302 320	1921	II Wichita
347	Emmanuel Boleslaus Ledvina	298 268 303	1921	II Corpus Christi
348	Hugh Charles Boyle	254 309 323	1921	VI Pittsburgh
349	Thomas Michael O'Leary	DE1 315 275	1921	III Springfield in Massachusetts
350	Michael Joseph Crane	255 309 330	1921	Philadelphia (auxiliary)

=== 351–400 ===
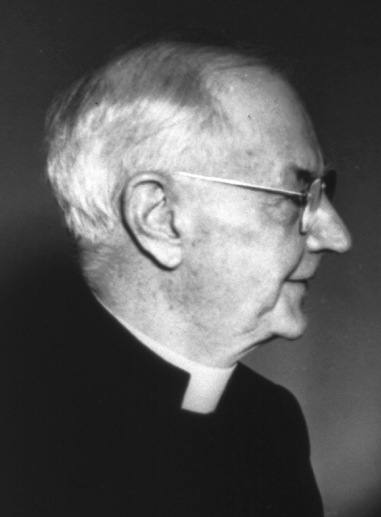
Samuel Cardinal Stritch (352) served as Archbishop of Milwaukee, and later of Chicago.

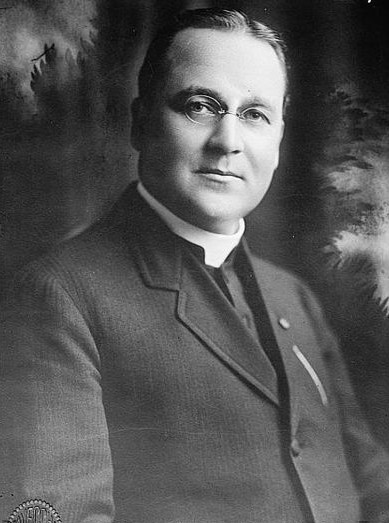
Francis Kelley (373), Bishop of Oklahoma City, founded the Catholic Church Extension Society.

Edward Mooney (379) was Cardinal and Archbishop of Detroit.

No.	Bishop	Consecrators	Year	Diocese
351	John Joseph Dunn	316 246 308	1921	New York (auxiliary)
352	Samuel Stritch*	241 273 343	1921	II Toledo, V Milwaukee, VIII Chicago
353	Edward Francis Hoban	287 235 343	1921	Chicago (auxiliary), II Rockford, VI Cleveland
354	Joseph G. Pinten	204 281 331	1922	III Superior, IV Grand Rapids
355	Patrick Barry	315 227 337	1922	V St. Augustine
356	John Joseph Swint	315 280 348	1922	Wheeling (auxiliary), IV Wheeling
357	Bernard Joseph Mahoney	DF1 DG1 DH1	1922	III Sioux Falls
358	Michael Joseph Keyes	315 280 355	1922	VIII Savannah
359	Francis Gilfillan	222 270 332	1922	III Saint Joseph
360	John A. Floersh	BU2° AH2 DI1	1923	VII Louisville
361	Andrew James Louis Brennan	219 342 357	1923	Scranton (auxiliary), VIII Richmond
362	Daniel Joseph Curley	316 335 337	1923	III Syracuse
363	Francis William Howard	241 261 360	1923	V Covington
364	Daniel James Gercke	255 291 DJ1	1923	III Tucson
365	James Aloysius Griffin	287 352 353	1924	IV Springfield in Illinois
366	Alphonse John Smith	298 347 352	1924	VI Nashville
367	Edward Howard	307 329 341	1924	Davenport (auxiliary), V Portland in Oregon
368	Francis Beckman	241 298 300	1924	IV Lincoln, VI Dubuque
369	Constantine Bohachevsky	CW2 DK1 DL1	1924	II Philadelphia of the Ukrainians
370	Basil Takach	CW2 DK1 DL1	1924	I Pittsburgh of the Ruthenians
371	Stephen Alencastre	327 319 344	1924	V Vicar Apostolic of the Hawaiian Islands
372	Joseph C. Plagens	320 281 353	1924	Detroit (auxiliary), VI Marquette, V Grand Rapids
373	Francis Kelley	287 DE1 DM1	1924	II Oklahoma City
374	Richard Oliver Gerow	228 334 365	1924	VII Natchez-Jackson
375	William Joseph Hafey	315 349 358	1925	I Raleigh, IV Scranton
376	John F. Noll	287 347 366	1925	V Fort Wayne
377	Edmond John Fitzmaurice	255 356 361	1925	IV Wilmington
378	Edwin Byrne (Note: Also #48 in the Puerto Rican historical succession of bishops.)	255 356 361	1925	I Ponce, XLVIII San Juan de Puerto Rico, VIII Santa Fe
379	Edward Mooney*	DN1 AH2 DO1	1926	IV Rochester, V Detroit
380	Thomas Anthony Welch	307 292 295	1926	III Duluth
381	Maurice F. McAuliffe	288 339 342	1926	Hartford (auxiliary), VIII Hartford
382	Francis Martin Kelly	294 295 380	1926	Winona (auxiliary), III Winona
383	John Joseph Mitty	316 351 362	1926	III Salt Lake City, IV San Francisco
384	Theodore H. Reverman	360 314 354	1926	IV Superior
385	Charles Daniel White	354 352 366	1927	II Spokane
386	Rudolph Gerken	303 332 373	1927	I Amarillo, VII Santa Fe
387	Thomas Joseph Toolen	315 358 374	1927	VI Mobile
388	James Edward Walsh	DP1 DQ1 CE2	1927	Vicar Apostolic of Kongmoon
389	Henry Rohlman	253 338 341	1927	IV Davenport, VII Dubuque
390	George Joseph Finnigan	DR1 353 376	1927	III Helena
391	Emmet M. Walsh	358 355 375	1927	VI Charleston, II Youngstown
392	John Bertram Peterson	244 275 342	1927	Boston (auxiliary), IV Manchester
393	Thomas Charles O'Reilly	255 300 357	1928	III Scranton
394	Edward Kelly	336 266 385	1928	III Boise
395	John Michael McNamara	315 375 387	1928	Baltimore (auxiliary), Washington (auxiliary)
396	John J. McMahon	337 330 335	1928	IV Trenton
397	Francis Johannes	359 345 346	1928	IV Leavenworth
398	Bernard James Sheil	287 286 353	1928	Chicago (auxiliary)
399	Joseph Rummel	316 343 351	1928	IV Omaha, XIII New Orleans
400	Robert John Armstrong	223 226 336	1929	IV Sacramento

=== 401–450 ===
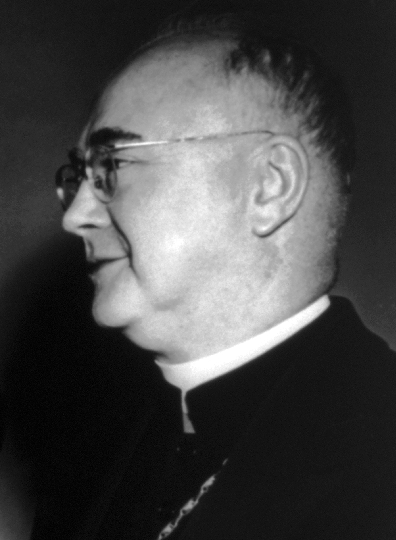
Francis Cardinal Spellman (415) served as Archbishop of New York.

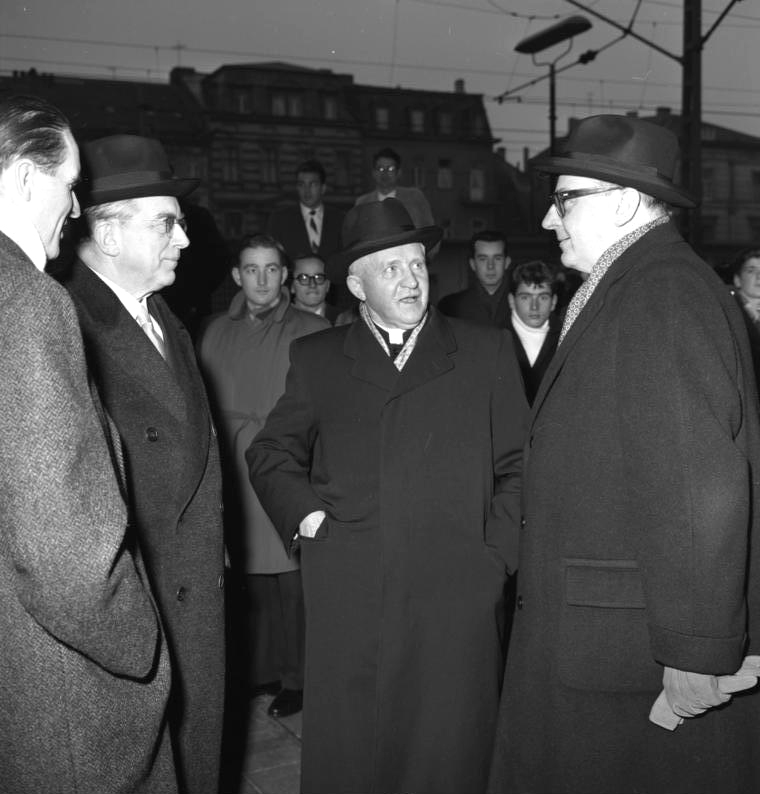
Aloisius Cardinal Muench (437, at center) served as Bishop of Fargo and, later, as Apostolic Nuncio to Germany.

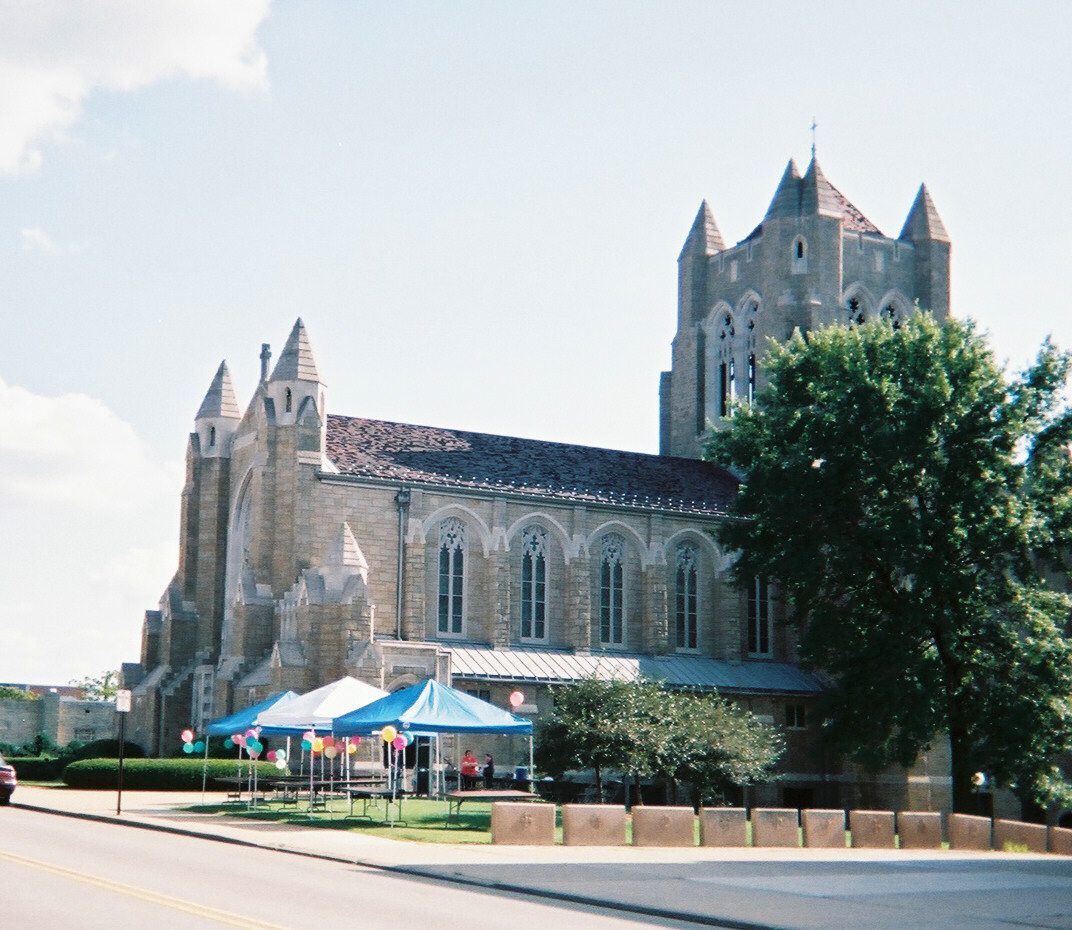
Bishop Hugh L. Lamb (441) became the first bishop of Greensburg in 1951 (cathedral pictured.)

No.	Bishop	Consecrators	Year	Diocese
401	John Francis O'Hern	316 310 393	1929	III Rochester
402	Gerald Patrick O'Hara	255 291 393	1929	Philadelphia (auxiliary), IX Savannah
403	Ivan Bucko	CV1 CX1 CW2	1929	Philadelphia of the Ukrainians (auxiliary)
404	Aloysius Joseph Willinger (Note: Also #49 in the Puerto Rican historical succession of bishops.)	343 328 351	1929	II Ponce, X Monterey-Fresno
405	Joseph H. Albers	331 363 368	1929	Cincinnati (auxiliary), nI Lansing
406	James Edwin Cassidy	DS1° 275 289	1930	Fall River (auxiliary), III Fall River
407	Joseph Henry Leo Schlarman	287 314 353	1930	III Peoria
408	Louis Benedict Kucera	368 341 389	1930	V Lincoln
409	Edwin Vincent O'Hara	367 325 385	1930	II Great Falls, III Kansas City
410	Urban John Vehr	331 368 405	1931	IV Denver
411	Karl Joseph Alter	331 346 405	1931	III Toledo, VI Cincinnati
412	Thomas Kiely Gorman	327 383 400	1931	I Reno, IV Dallas
413	Stanislaus Vincent Bona	287 281 382	1932	II Grand Island, VII Green Bay
414	Joseph Edward McCarthy	381 288 392	1932	VI Portland in Maine
415	Francis Spellman*	DT1 CO2 DU1	1932	Boston (auxiliary), IX New York
416	James A. McFadden	300 320 393	1932	Cleveland (auxiliary), I Youngstown
417	James E. Kearney	316 351 383	1932	IV Salt Lake City, V Rochester
418	Daniel Francis Desmond	392 414 415	1933	V Alexandria
419	Joseph Ritter*	298 347 366	1933	VII Indianapolis, V St. Louis
420	Philip George Scher	310 327 412	1933	IX Monterey-Fresno
421	John A. Duffy	330 365 366	1933	IV Syracuse, VII Buffalo
422	James Anthony Walsh	DS1° 331 351	1933	Superior General of Maryknoll
423	Gerald Shaughnessy	CR2° 358 385	1933	IV Seattle
424	Charles Hubert Le Blond	300 393 416	1933	IV Saint Joseph
425	Ralph Leo Hayes	348 365 366	1933	IV Helena, V Davenport
426	James Hugh Ryan	298 343 419	1933	V Omaha
427	Christian Herman Winkelmann	222 270 397	1933	St. Louis (auxiliary), III Wichita
428	Moses E. Kiley	CB2 DV1 330	1934	V Trenton, VI Milwaukee
429	William David O'Brien	287 303 398	1934	Chicago (auxiliary)
430	Stephen Joseph Donahue	316 379 383	1934	New York (auxiliary)
431	Robert Emmet Lucey	CR2° 327 412	1934	II Amarillo, VI San Antonio
432	Francis Patrick Keough	CR2° 342 406	1934	IV Providence, XI Baltimore
433	Gerald Thomas Bergan	287 389 407	1934	III Des Moines, VI Omaha
434	Raymond Augustine Kearney	343 428 430	1935	Brooklyn (auxiliary)
435	William Richard Griffin	287 427 429	1935	La Crosse (auxiliary)
436	Thomas H. McLaughlin	330 407 421	1935	Newark (auxiliary), I Paterson
437	Aloisius Joseph Muench*	CR2° 427 435	1935	III Fargo
438	George L. Leech	255 393 426	1935	V Harrisburg
439	Peter Leo Ireton	315 393 426	1935	IX Richmond
440	Joseph Michael Gilmore	CR2° 336 409	1936	V Helena
441	Hugh L. Lamb	255 402 438	1936	Philadelphia (auxiliary), I Greensburg
442	William Lawrence Adrian	CR2° 389 428	1936	VII Nashville
443	Francis Joseph Monaghan	330 308 436	1936	IV Ogdensburg
444	Mariano Simon Garriga	333 347 437	1936	III Corpus Christi
445	Richard Thomas Guilfoyle	328 330 345	1936	III Altoona
446	Charles F. Buddy	424 433 443	1936	I San Diego
447	Walter Andrew Foery	379 391 432	1937	V Syracuse
448	Paul Clarence Schulte	222 332 427	1937	V Leavenworth, VIII Indianapolis
449	George John Rehring	331 405 410	1937	Cincinnati (auxiliary), IV Toledo
450	Duane Garrison Hunt	383 400 412	1937	V Salt Lake City

=== 451–500 ===
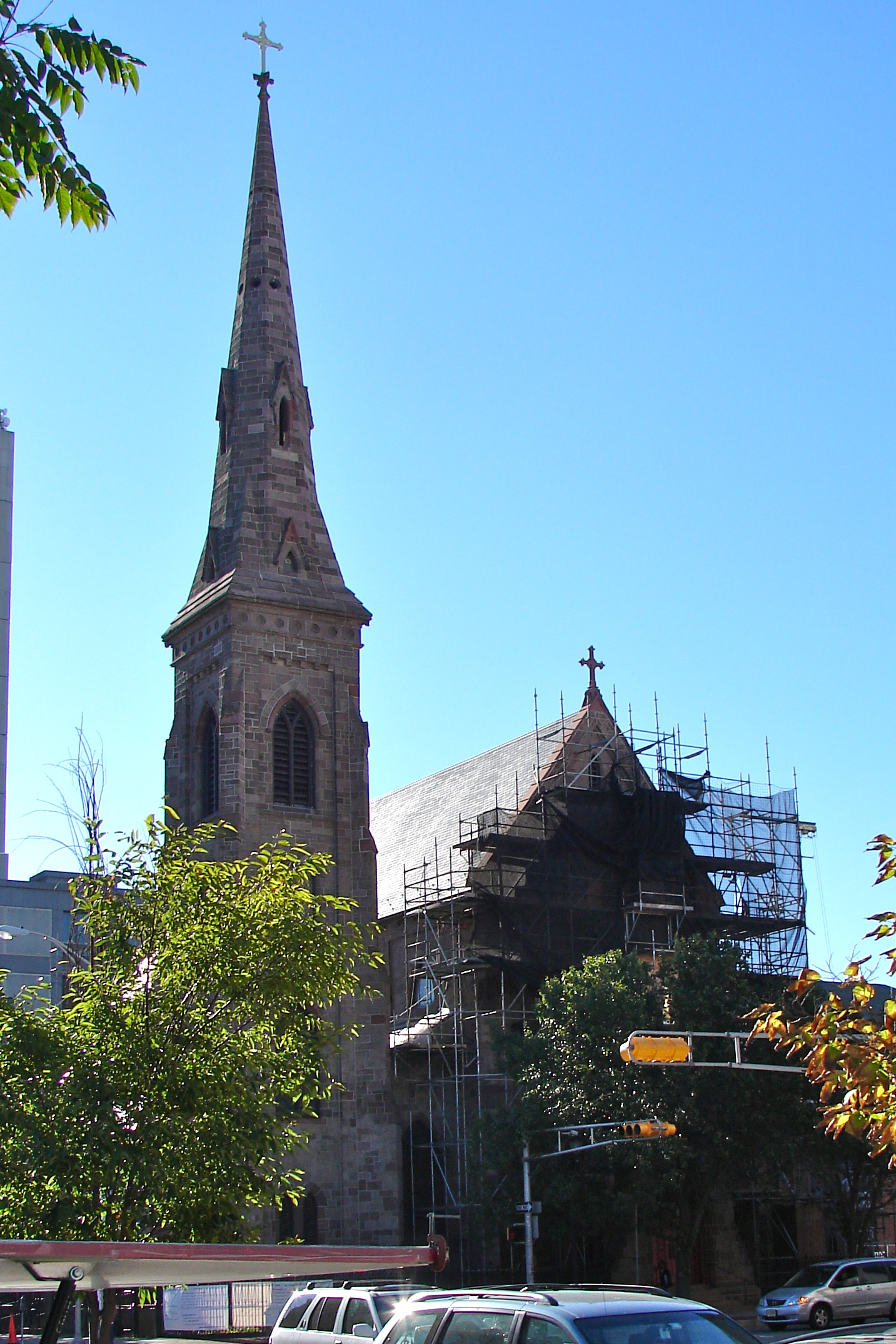
The diocese of Camden (cathedral pictured) was erected in 1938 with Bartholomew J. Eustace (454) as its first bishop.

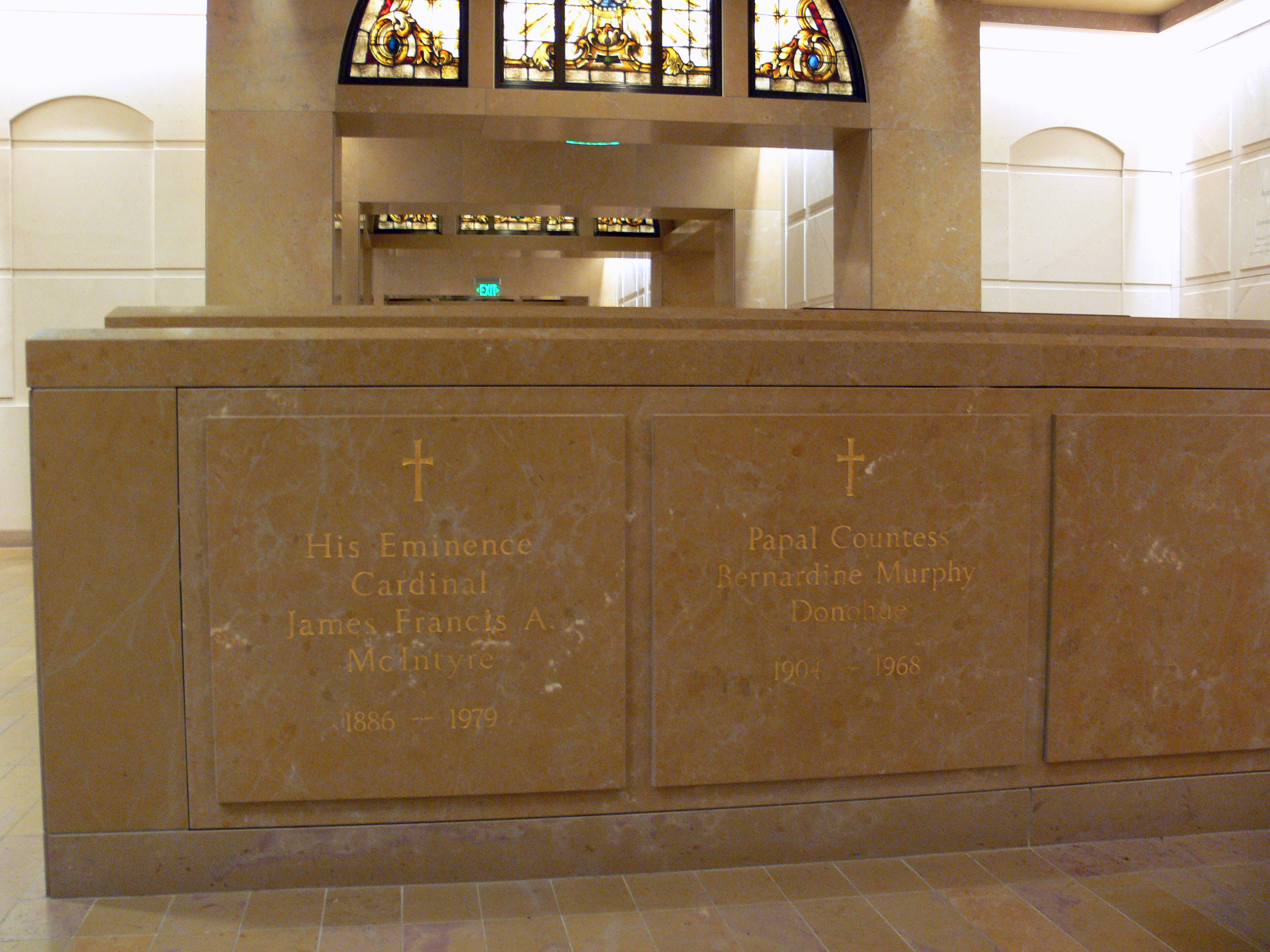
Tomb of James Cardinal McIntyre (476) in the crypt of the Cathedral of Our Lady of the Angels, Los Angeles

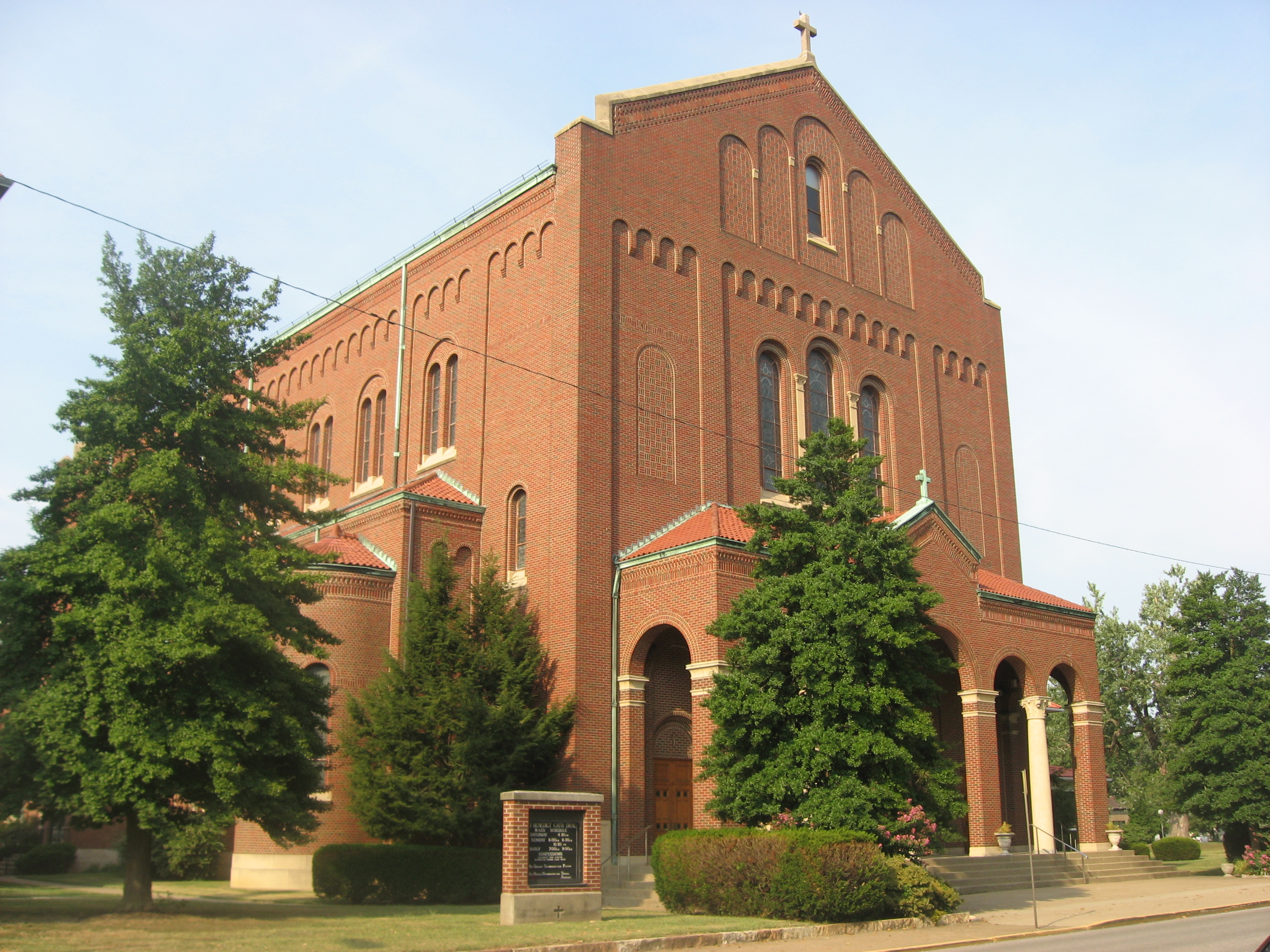
The diocese of Evansville (cathedral pictured) was erected in 1944 with Henry Joseph Grimmelsmann (496) as its first bishop.

No.	Bishop	Consecrators	Year	Diocese
451	Eugene J. McGuinness	255 429 441	1937	II Raleigh, III Oklahoma City-Tulsa
452	Stephen Stanislaus Woznicki	379 372 375	1938	Detroit (auxiliary), II Saginaw
453	Francis Ridgley Cotton	360 384 428	1938	I Owensboro
454	Bartholomew J. Eustace	316 394 430	1938	I Camden
455	William A. Griffin	330 372 421	1938	Newark (auxiliary), VI Trenton
456	William Murphy	379 372 421	1938	I Saginaw
457	Matthew Francis Brady	CR2° 381 414	1938	IV Burlington, V Manchester
458	Francis Augustine Thill	331 368 410	1938	V Salina
459	John Hubert Peschges	382 295 409	1938	II Crookston
460	Walter James Fitzgerald	325 385 400	1939	II Vicar Apostolic of Alaska
461	Richard Cushing*	244 392 DW1	1939	Boston (auxiliary), VI Boston
462	Thomas Arthur Connolly	383 400 412	1939	San Francisco (auxiliary), V Seattle
463	William Brady	342 406 410	1939	IV Sioux Falls, VI Saint Paul
464	William Joseph Condon	385 336 394	1939	III Great Falls
465	John Francis O'Hara*	415 376 419	1940	Military Vicar of the United States (auxiliary), VIII Buffalo, IX Philadelphia
466	Joseph M. Corrigan	255 315 379	1940	Rector of The Catholic University of America
467	Sidney Matthew Metzger	333 386 444	1940	Santa Fe (auxiliary), II El Paso
468	George Joseph Donnelly	222 427 448	1940	St. Louis (auxiliary), VI Kansas City in Kansas
469	Albert Lewis Fletcher	CR2° 334 429	1940	Little Rock (auxiliary), IV Little Rock
470	Henry Joseph O'Brien	CR2° 381 414	1940	Hartford (auxiliary), IX Hartford
471	Vincent James Ryan	437 295 380	1940	II Bismarck
472	Raymond Aloysius Lane	388 414 461	1940	Superior General of Maryknoll
473	Thomas Aloysius Boland	330 454 455	1940	Newark (auxiliary), II Paterson, VI Newark
474	Joseph Patrick Hurley	CP2 DX1 DY1	1940	VI St. Augustine
475	Bernard T. Espelage	331 405 419	1940	I Gallup
476	James Francis McIntyre*	415 430 465	1941	New York (auxiliary, coadjutor), VIII Los Angeles
477	Francis Joseph Magner	352 429 451	1941	VII Marquette
478	Joseph Thomas McGucken	327 364 420	1941	Los Angeles (auxiliary), V Sacramento, V San Francisco
479	James Joseph Sweeney	383 451 462	1941	I Honolulu
480	Laurence Julius FitzSimon	CR2° 444 467	1941	III Amarillo
481	Joseph Clement Willging	CR2° 389 440	1942	I Pueblo
482	Edward Gerard Hettinger	261 363 449	1942	Columbus (auxiliary)
483	Peter William Bartholome	CR2° 295 459	1942	VI Saint Cloud
484	William Patrick O'Connor	428 437 471	1942	V Superior, I Madison
485	Augustine Danglmayr	CR2° 303 429	1942	Dallas (auxiliary)
486	Ambrose Senyshyn	369 370 DZ1	1942	I Stamford of the Ukrainians, III Philadelphia of the Ukrainians
487	Leo Binz	CR2° 353 389	1942	Winona (coadjutor), VIII Dubuque, VII Saint Paul and Minneapolis
488	William Tibertus McCarty	415 343 465	1943	Military Vicar of the United States (auxiliary), IV Rapid City
489	Martin John O'Connor	375 402 438	1943	Scranton (auxiliary), Rector of the North American College
490	John Joseph Boylan	433 338 389	1943	III Rockford
491	Joseph A. Burke	CR2° 330 335	1943	Buffalo (auxiliary), IX Buffalo
492	Bryan Joseph McEntegart	CR2° 335 430	1943	V Ogdensburg, IV Brooklyn
493	James Peter Davis (Note: Also #50 in the Puerto Rican historical succession of bishops.)	364 462 478	1943	XLIX San Juan de Puerto Rico, IX Santa Fe
494	Francis J. Haas	CR2° 379 428	1943	VI Grand Rapids
495	Michael Joseph Ready	CR2° 331 353	1944	V Columbus
496	Henry Joseph Grimmelsmann	CR2° 410 449	1944	I Evansville
497	Edward Francis Ryan	461 415 432	1945	V Burlington
498	William Theodore Mulloy	437 471 483	1945	VI Covington
499	John George Bennett	376 453 465	1945	I Lafayette in Indiana
500	Joseph Patrick Donahue	415 465 476	1945	New York (auxiliary)

=== 501–550 ===
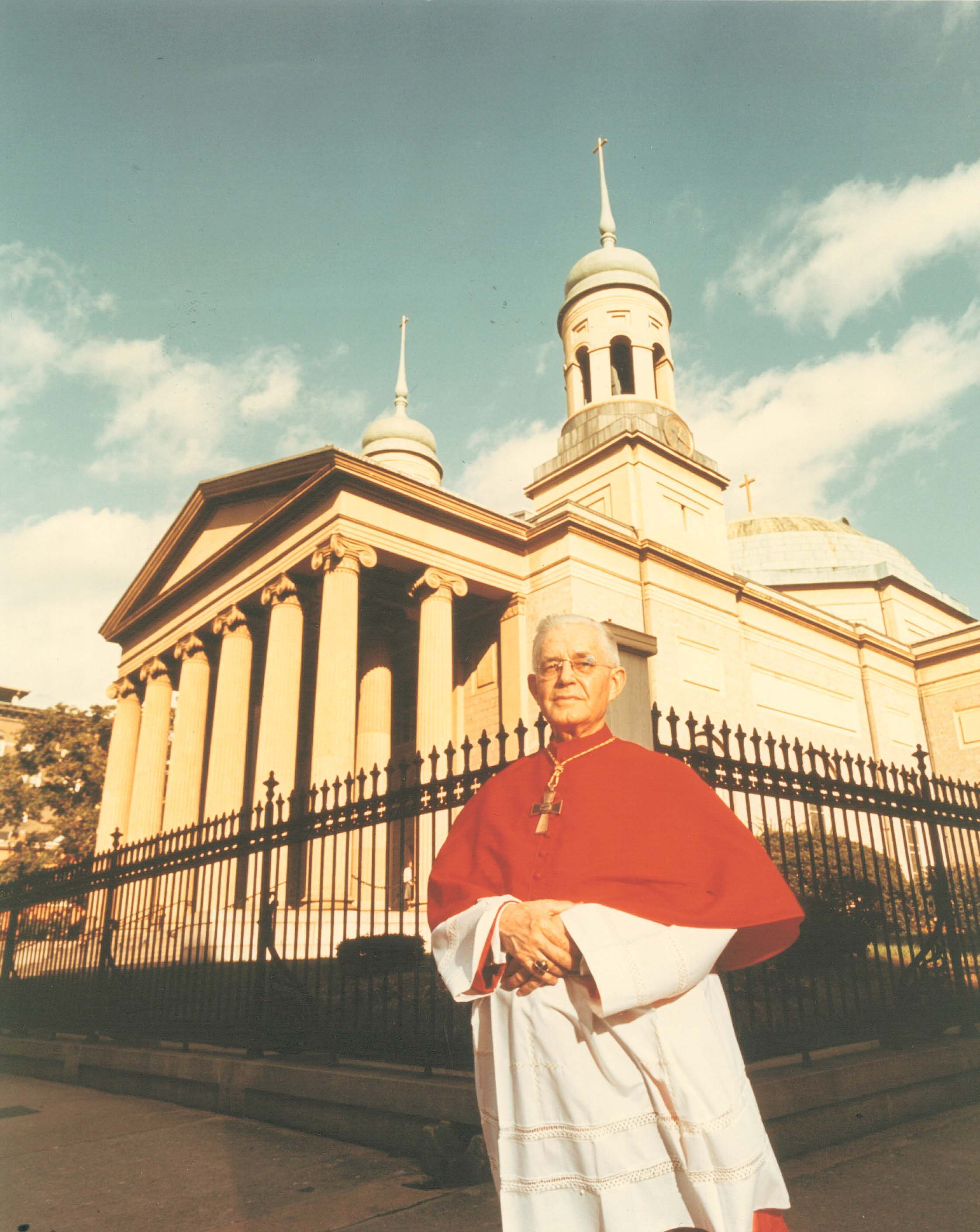
Lawrence Cardinal Shehan (510) was the twelfth Archbishop of Baltimore.

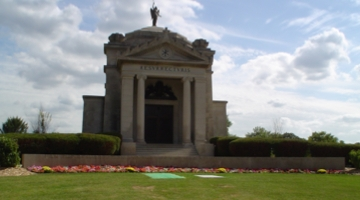
The Archbishops of Chicago, including Samuel Cardinal Stritch (352) and John Cardinal Cody (527), are buried in this tomb at Mount Carmel Cemetery.

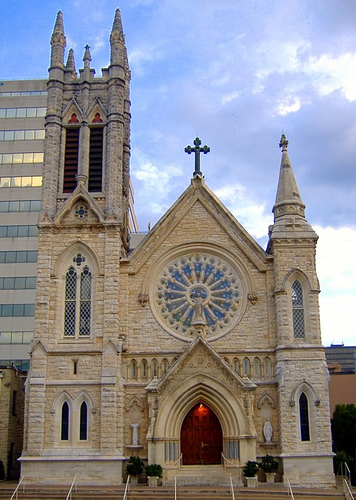
In 1948, Louis Joseph Reicher (542) became the first bishop of Austin (cathedral pictured.)

No.	Bishop	Consecrators	Year	Diocese
501	Edward Joseph Hunkeler	CR2° 413 426	1945	III Grand Island, VII Kansas City in Kansas
502	Anthony John King Mussio	331 449 495	1945	I Steubenville
503	Vincent Stanislaus Waters	439 391 402	1945	III Raleigh
504	James Louis Connolly	342 463 487	1945	IV Fall River
505	Francis Joseph Schenk	342 380 437	1945	III Crookston, IV Duluth
506	Louis Francis Kelleher	461 415 497	1945	Boston (auxiliary)
507	John Patrick Treacy	CR2° 353 429	1945	V La Crosse
508	William Richard Arnold	415 376 465	1945	Military Vicar of the United States (auxiliary)
509	William Scully	335 343 492	1945	VII Albany
510	Lawrence Shehan*	CR2° 395 439	1945	Baltimore (auxiliary), I Bridgeport, XII Baltimore
511	Charles Pasquale Greco	399 374 387	1946	VI Alexandria
512	Thomas Lawrence Noa	379 385 405	1946	VIII Marquette
513	Albert Gregory Meyer*	428 437 484	1946	VI Superior, VII Milwaukee, IX Chicago
514	John Raphael Hagan	353 416 507	1946	Cleveland (auxiliary)
515	Leo Ferdinand Dworschak	CR2° 471 498	1946	Fargo (auxiliary), IV Fargo
516	Daniel Joseph Feeney	CR2° 457 506	1946	Portland in Maine (auxiliary), VII Portland in Maine
517	Edward Aloysius Fitzgerald	389 408 487	1946	Dubuque (auxiliary), IV Winona
518	Timothy Manning*	478 388 462	1946	Los Angeles (auxiliary), I Fresno, IX Los Angeles
519	Daniel Ivancho (Note: Renounced the priesthood in 1957)	369 486 EA1	1946	II Pittsburgh of the Ruthenians
520	Allen James Babcock	379 452 456	1947	Detroit (auxiliary), VII Grand Rapids
521	Joseph Carroll McCormick	255 441 451	1947	Philadelphia (auxiliary), V Altoona-Johnstown, VI Scranton
522	Mark Kenny Carroll	419 448 468	1947	IV Wichita
523	Thomas Joseph McDonough	255 391 521	1947	St. Augustine (auxiliary), X Savannah, VIII Louisville
524	Floyd Lawrence Begin	353 416 478	1947	Cleveland (auxiliary), I Oakland
525	John Wright*	461 425 504	1947	Boston (auxiliary), I Worcester, VIII Pittsburgh
526	James Edward McManus (Note: Also #51 in the Puerto Rican historical succession of bishops.)	488 404 429	1947	III Ponce, New York (auxiliary)
527	John Cody*	419 468 503	1947	St. Louis (auxiliary), IV Kansas City-Saint Joseph, XIV New Orleans, X Chicago
528	James Byrne	CR2° 380 505	1947	Saint Paul and Minneapolis (auxiliary), IV Boise, IX Dubuque
529	Henry Klonowski	375 438 452	1947	Scranton (auxiliary)
530	Joseph M. Marling	409 405 499	1947	Kansas City (auxiliary), I Jefferson City
531	Roman Richard Atkielski	428 413 484	1947	Milwaukee (auxiliary)
532	Thomas John McDonnell	415 461 476	1947	New York (auxiliary), Wheeling-Charleston (coadjutor)
533	Hubert Newell	410 440 481	1947	V Cheyenne
534	James A. McNulty	330 455 470	1947	Newark (auxiliary), III Paterson, X Buffalo
535	Hugh Aloysius Donohoe	383 462 479	1947	San Francisco (auxiliary), I Stockton, II Fresno
536	Joseph Maximilian Mueller	CR2° 407 501	1947	III Sioux City
537	Louis Abel Caillouet	399 334 511	1947	New Orleans (auxiliary)
538	Patrick O'Boyle*	415 395 529	1948	II Washington
539	Albert Rudolph Zuroweste	407 527 536	1948	III Belleville
540	Wendelin Joseph Nold	303 332 485	1948	V Galveston-Houston
541	Francis Doyle Gleeson	367 385 EB1	1948	I Fairbanks
542	Louis Joseph Reicher	332 405 444	1948	I Austin
543	Edward Celestin Daly	CR2° 389 487	1948	IV Des Moines
544	John Francis Dearden*	CR2° 353 524	1948	VII Pittsburgh, VI Detroit
545	Leo John Steck	419 522 527	1948	Salt Lake City (auxiliary)
546	Leo Fabian Fahey	374 487 537	1948	Baker City (coadjutor)
547	James Thomas O'Dowd	383 462 535	1948	San Francisco (auxiliary)
548	Russell McVinney	CR2° 470 504	1948	V Providence
549	Edward Peter McManaman	328 375 488	1948	Erie (auxiliary)
550	Joseph Francis Flannelly	415 430 500	1948	New York (auxiliary)

=== 551–600 ===
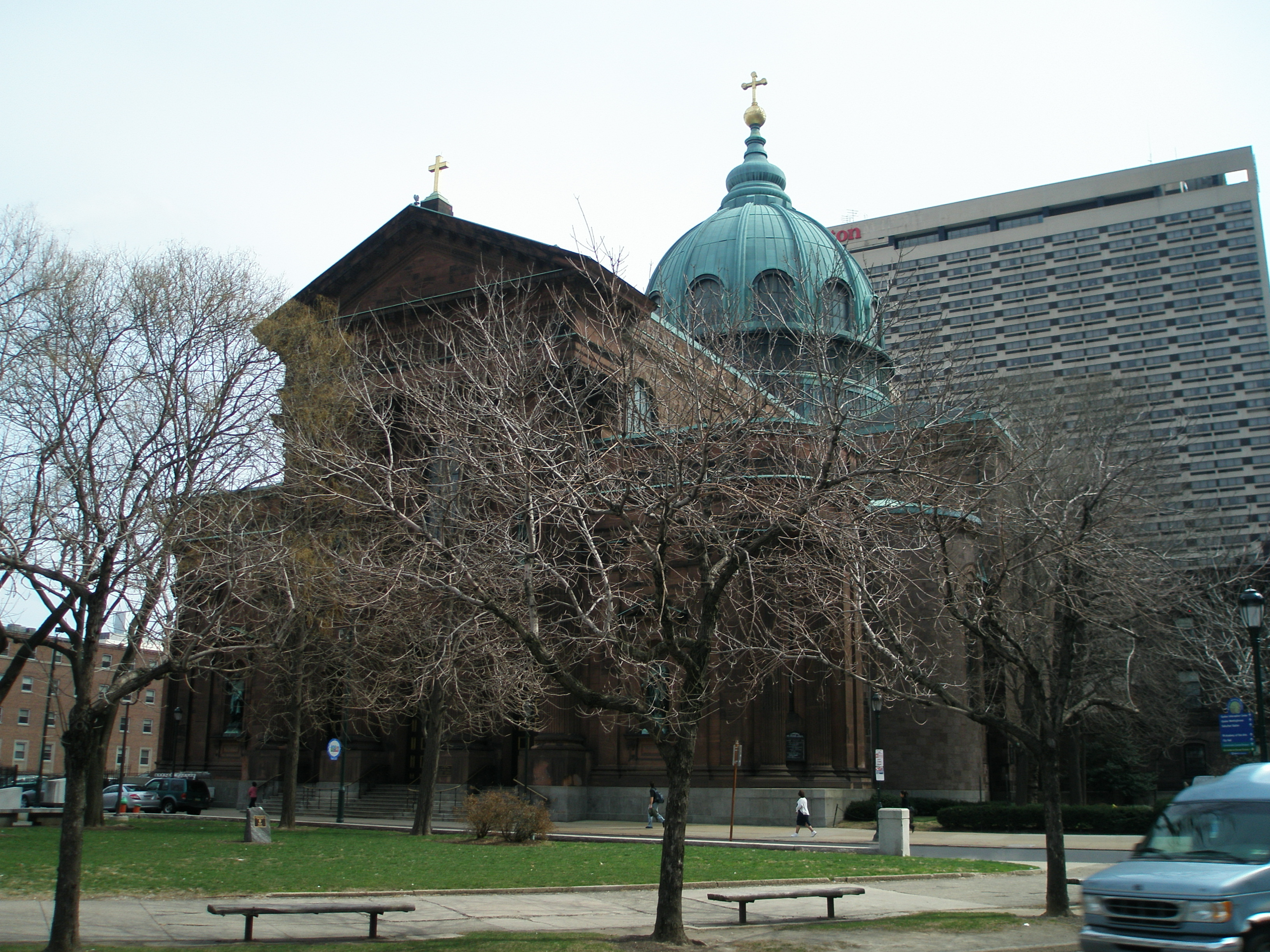
John Cardinal Krol (587) was Archbishop of Philadelphia (cathedral pictured.)

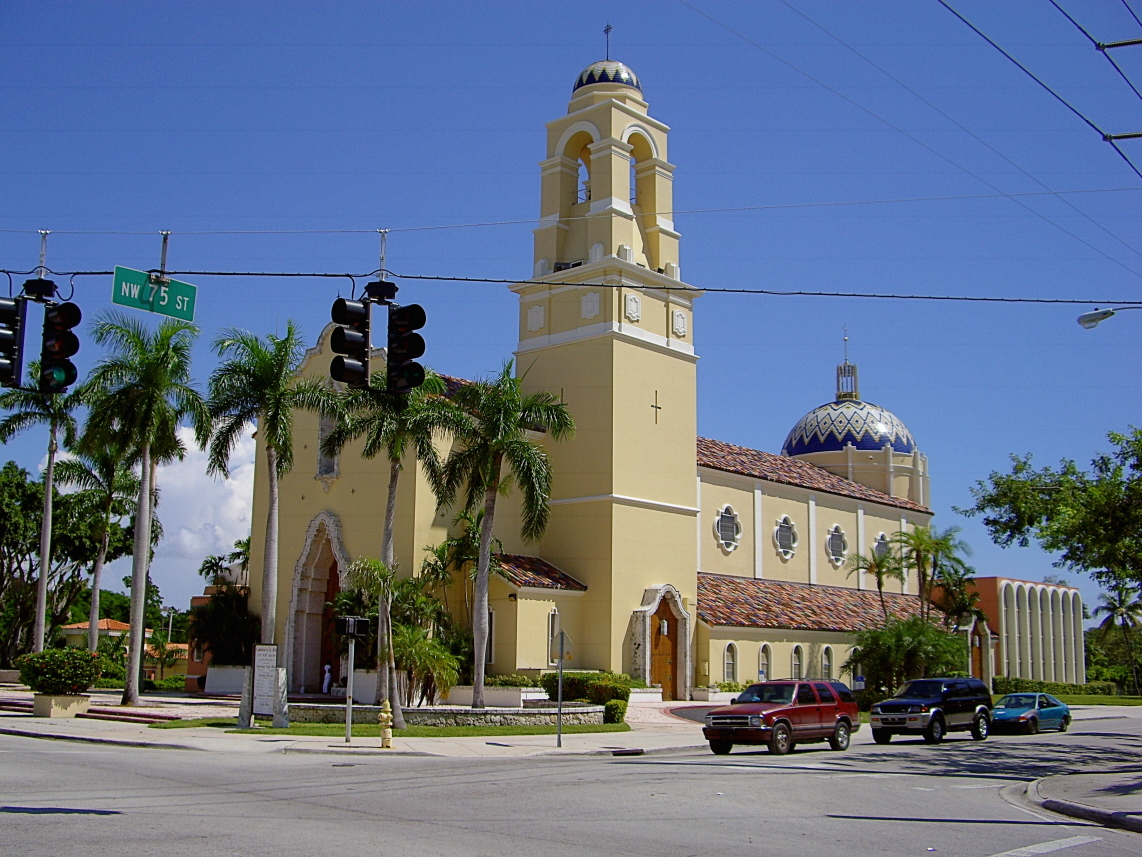
Coleman Carroll (591) was the first Archbishop of Miami (cathedral pictured.)

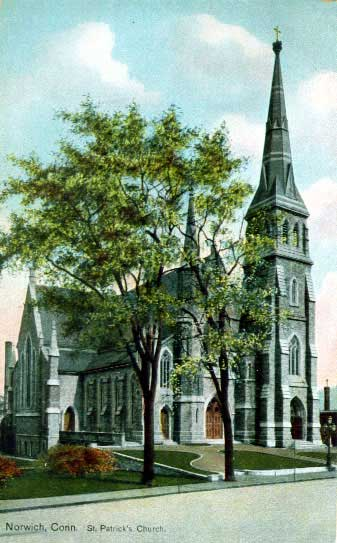
The diocese of Norwich was erected in 1953 with Bernard Joseph Flanagan (592) as its first bishop (cathedral pictured.)

No.	Bishop	Consecrators	Year	Diocese
551	Martin Dewey McNamara	352 490 539	1949	I Joliet
552	William Edward Cousins	352 490 539	1949	Chicago (auxiliary), IV Peoria, VIII Milwaukee
553	William Aloysius O'Connor	352 490 539	1949	V Springfield in Illinois
554	Charles Herman Helmsing	419 527 545	1949	St. Louis (auxiliary), I Springfield-Cape Girardeau, V Kansas City-Saint Joseph
555	John Benjamin Grellinger	428 413 513	1949	Green Bay (auxiliary)
556	Francis Edward Hyland	255 441 521	1949	Savannah-Atlanta (auxiliary), I Atlanta
557	James Henry Ambrose Griffiths	415 343 508	1950	New York (auxiliary)
558	John Joyce Russell	CR2° 395 538	1950	VII Charleston, X Richmond
559	George W. Ahr	330 454 473	1950	VII Trenton
560	Christopher Joseph Weldon	415 430 461	1950	IV Springfield in Massachusetts
561	Alexander M. Zaleski	379 452 520	1950	Detroit (auxiliary), II Lansing
562	David Frederick Cunningham	415 447 492	1950	Syracuse (auxiliary), VI Syracuse
563	Francis Peter Leipzig	367 394 409	1950	III Baker
564	Eric Francis MacKenzie	461 412 538	1950	Boston (auxiliary)
565	Thomas Francis Markham	461 412 538	1950	Boston (auxiliary)
566	Leo Aloysius Pursley	CR2° 376 530	1950	Fort Wayne (auxiliary), VI Fort Wayne-South Bend
567	Merlin Guilfoyle	383 479 535	1950	San Francisco (auxiliary), II Stockton
568	Patrick Joseph McCormick	CR2° 470 538	1950	Washington (auxiliary)
569	Maurice Schexnayder	CR2° 334 537	1951	Lafayette in Louisiana (auxiliary), II Lafayette in Louisiana
570	Joseph Lennox Federal	CR2° 451 503	1951	Salt Lake City (auxiliary), VI Salt Lake City
571	Fulton J. Sheen^{#}	DF2 EC1 489	1951	New York (auxiliary), VI Rochester
572	Loras Thomas Lane	487 481 517	1951	Dubuque (auxiliary), VI Rockford
573	John Baptist Franz	352 522 553	1951	I Dodge City, V Peoria
574	Joseph Patrick Dougherty	462 385 535	1951	I Yakima, Los Angeles (auxiliary)
575	Robert Dermot O'Flanagan	541 385 574	1951	I Juneau
576	John Linus Paschang	433 408 501	1951	IV Grand Island
577	Joseph Mark McShea	CR2° 429 451	1952	Philadelphia (auxiliary), I Allentown
578	Lambert Anthony Hoch	CR2° 463 505	1952	III Bismarck, V Sioux Falls
579	John Joseph Boardman	343 434 532	1952	Brooklyn (auxiliary)
580	Robert Joseph Dwyer	383 412 570	1952	II Reno, VI Portland in Oregon
581	James Johnston Navagh	CR2° 434 557	1952	Raleigh (auxiliary), VII Ogdensburg, IV Paterson
582	Leo Richard Smith	CR2° 434 557	1952	Buffalo (auxiliary), VIII Ogdensburg
583	Joseph Howard Hodges	439 503 544	1952	Richmond (auxiliary), V Wheeling-Charleston
584	Celestine Damiano	491 465 582	1953	III Camden
585	John Francis Hackett	470 432 457	1953	Hartford (auxiliary)
586	Lawrence B. Casey	415 447 561	1953	Rochester (auxiliary), V Paterson
587	John Krol*	CR2° 353 524	1953	Cleveland (auxiliary), X Philadelphia
588	Francis Joseph Green	364 493 535	1953	Tucson (auxiliary), IV Tucson
589	Walter P. Kellenberg	476 509 550	1953	New York (auxiliary), VI Ogdenburg, I Rockville Centre
590	Edward Vincent Dargin	476 509 550	1953	New York (auxiliary)
591	Coleman Carroll	CR2° 495 544	1953	Pittsburgh (auxiliary), I Miami
592	Bernard Joseph Flanagan	497 503 527	1953	I Norwich, II Worcester
593	Raymond Peter Hillinger	352 551 553	1953	IV Rockford
594	Jerome A. D. Sebastian	CR2° 510 558	1954	Baltimore (auxiliary)
595	Joseph John Annabring	513 484 505	1954	VII Superior
596	Joseph Maria Pernicone	415 550 590	1954	New York (auxiliary)
597	Clarence George Issenmann	411 410 449	1954	Cincinnati (auxiliary), VI Columbus, VII Cleveland
598	Justin J. McCarthy	473 454 534	1954	Newark (auxiliary), II Camden
599	Leo Christopher Byrne	419 522 527	1954	St. Louis (auxiliary), Wichita (coadjutor), Saint Paul and Minneapolis (coadjutor)
600	Jeremiah Francis Minihan	461 503 525	1954	Boston (auxiliary)

=== 601–650 ===
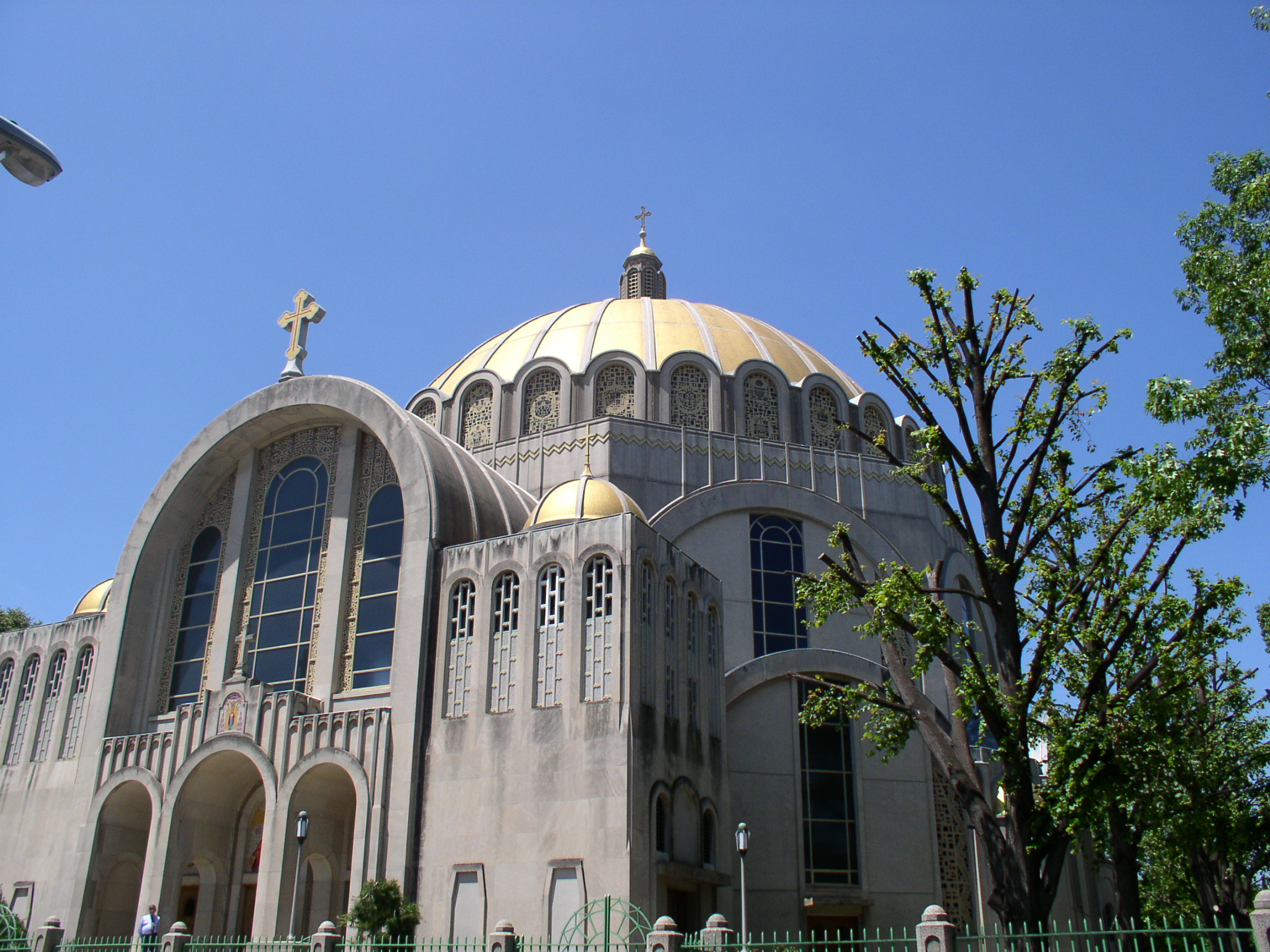
Joseph M. Schmondiuk (624) became Ukrainian Exarch of Philadelphia in 1977 (cathedral pictured.)

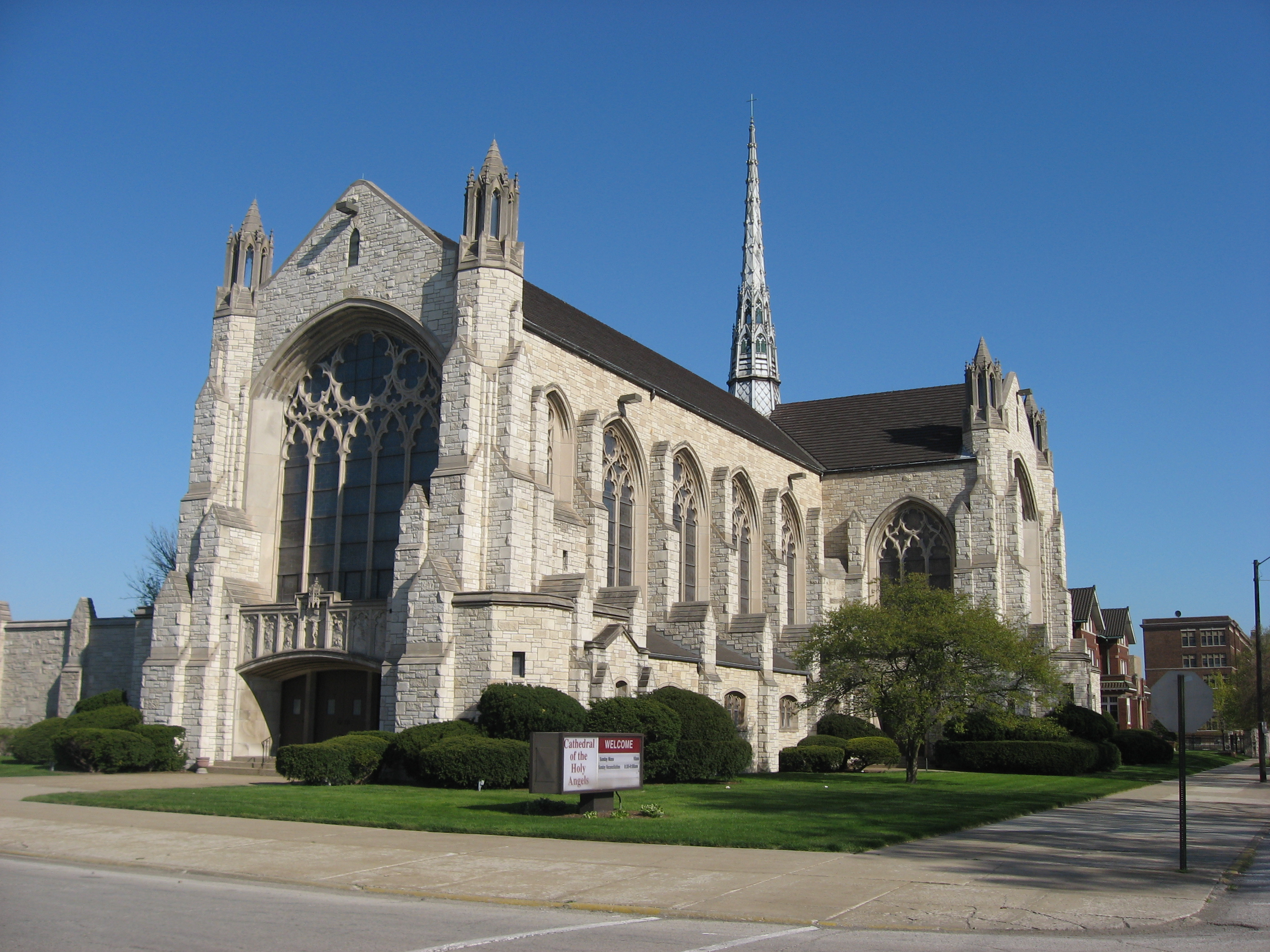
Andrew Gregory Grutka (626) was the first bishop of Gary, Indiana, and served in that position for twenty-eight years (cathedral pictured.)

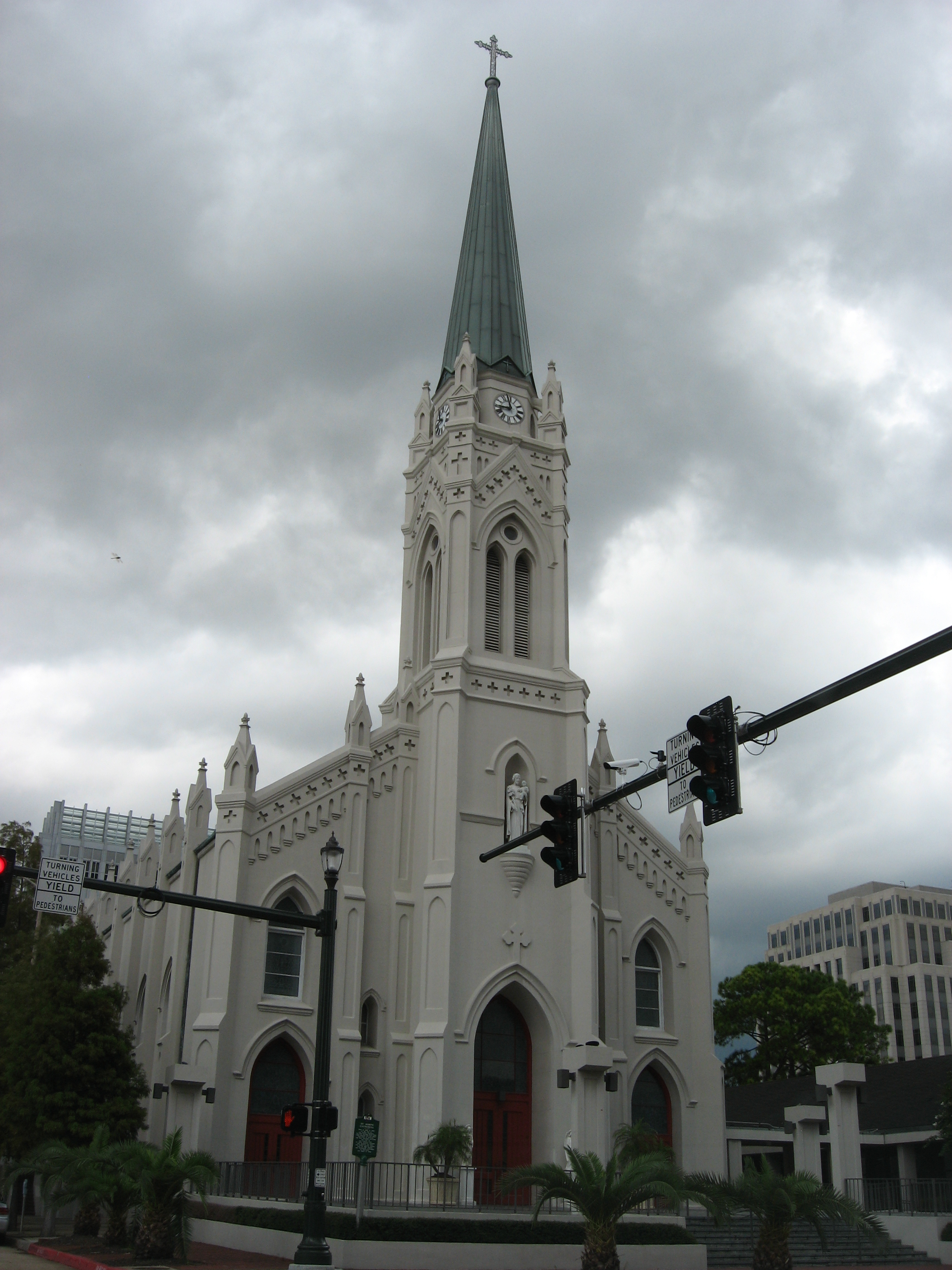
The diocese of Baton Rouge was erected in 1961 with Robert Emmet Tracy (648) as its first bishop (cathedral pictured.)

No.	Bishop	Consecrators	Year	Diocese
601	John Joseph Scanlan	383 462 479	1954	Honolulu (auxiliary), II Honolulu
602	Jerome Daniel Hannan	CR2° 529 538	1954	V Scranton
603	John Anthony Donovan	379 520 561	1954	Detroit (auxiliary), V Toledo
604	Henry Edmund Donnelly	379 520 561	1954	Detroit (auxiliary)
605	Robert Francis Joyce	497 457 592	1954	Burlington (auxiliary), VI Burlington
606	Charles Garrett Maloney	360 425 597	1955	Louisville (auxiliary)
607	Nicholas Elko	AL2 ED1 EE1	1955	III Pittsburgh of the Ruthenians, Cincinnati (auxiliary)
608	Joseph Aloysius Durick	387 374 474	1955	Mobile-Birmingham (auxiliary), VIII Nashville
609	Edmund Joseph Reilly	343 434 579	1955	Brooklyn (auxiliary)
610	Bernard Joseph Topel	440 481 574	1955	III Spokane
611	Philip Joseph Furlong	415 492 550	1956	Military Vicar of the United States (auxiliary)
612	Stephen Aloysius Leven	451 412 534	1956	San Antonio (auxiliary), III San Angelo
613	John Louis Morkovsky	CR2° 444 467	1956	Amarillo (auxiliary), III Amarillo, VI Galveston-Houston
614	Lawrence Frederik Schott	438 495 534	1956	Harrisburg (auxiliary)
615	Richard Henry Ackerman	544 EF1 532	1956	San Diego (auxiliary), VII Covington
616	Thomas Edward Gill	462 535 574	1956	Seattle (auxiliary)
617	Alden John Bell	476 478 518	1956	Los Angeles (auxiliary), VI Sacramento
618	John Carberry*	434 555 559	1956	II Lafayette in Indiana, VII Columbus, VI St. Louis
619	Philip Hannan	CR2° 395 538	1956	Washington (auxiliary), XV New Orleans
620	Lawrence Alexander Glenn	CR2° 380 505	1956	Duluth (auxiliary), IV Crookston
621	Adolph Marx	444 587 606	1956	Corpus Christi (auxiliary), I Brownsville
622	Stephen Kocisko	607 486 DZ2	1956	I Passaic of the Byzantines, IV Pittsburgh of the Byzantines
623	Hubert James Cartwright	465 521 556	1956	Wilmington (coadjutor)
624	Joseph M. Schmondiuk	369 486 607	1956	II Stamford of the Ukrainians, IV Philadelphia of the Ukrainians
625	Joseph Bernard Brunini	374 511 613	1957	Natchez (auxiliary), VIII Jackson
626	Andrew Gregory Grutka	CR2° 527 566	1957	I Gary
627	Hilary Baumann Hacker	463 505 528	1957	IV Bismarck
628	Harry Anselm Clinch	404 518 567	1957	Monterey-Fresno (auxiliary), XI Monterey
629	George Biskup	CR2° 487 572	1957	Dubuque (auxiliary), V Des Moines, IX Indianapolis
630	James Vincent Casey	CR2° 487 572	1957	Lincoln (auxiliary), VI Lincoln, V Denver
631	Glennon Patrick Flavin	419 554 599	1957	St. Louis (auxiliary), VII Lincoln
632	Edward Joseph Maginn	509 596 605	1957	Albany (auxiliary)
633	Walter William Curtis	473 534 559	1957	Newark (auxiliary), II Bridgeport
634	Martin Walter Stanton	473 534 559	1957	Newark (auxiliary)
635	Frederick William Freking	CO2 CP3 489	1957	VI Salina, VI La Crosse
636	John Michael Fearns	415 538 632	1957	New York (auxiliary)
637	Howard Joseph Carroll	CR2° 544 591	1958	IV Altoona-Johnstown
638	Alphonse James Schladweiler	463 528 627	1958	I New Ulm
639	Leonard Philip Cowley	463 528 627	1958	Saint Paul and Minneapolis (auxiliary)
640	Victor Joseph Reed	CR2° 600 612	1958	IV Oklahoma City-Tulsa
641	Paul Francis Leibold	411 587 597	1958	Cincinnati (auxiliary), II Evansville, VII Cincinnati
642	Michael William Hyle	CR2° 513 594	1958	V Wilmington
643	Paul John Hallinan	CR2° 353 587	1958	VIII Charleston, II Atlanta
644	James Joseph Gerrard	504 548 600	1959	Fall River (auxiliary)
645	John William Comber	415 472 551	1959	Superior General of Maryknoll
646	Charles Richard Mulrooney	492 557 618	1959	Brooklyn (auxiliary)
647	Joseph Peter Michael Denning	492 557 618	1959	Brooklyn (auxiliary)
648	Robert Emmet Tracy	EG1° 537 569	1959	Lafayette in Louisiana (auxiliary), I Baton Rouge
649	John Maguire	415 550 557	1959	New York (auxiliary, coadjutor)
650	Charles Albert Buswell	640 612 631	1959	II Pueblo

=== 651–700 ===
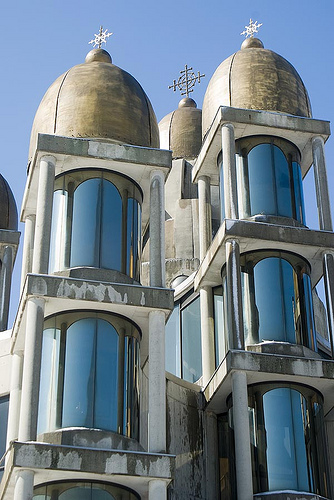
Bishop Jaroslav Gabro (672) was named the first bishop of the Ukrainian Catholic Eparchy of Chicago in 1961 (church pictured.)

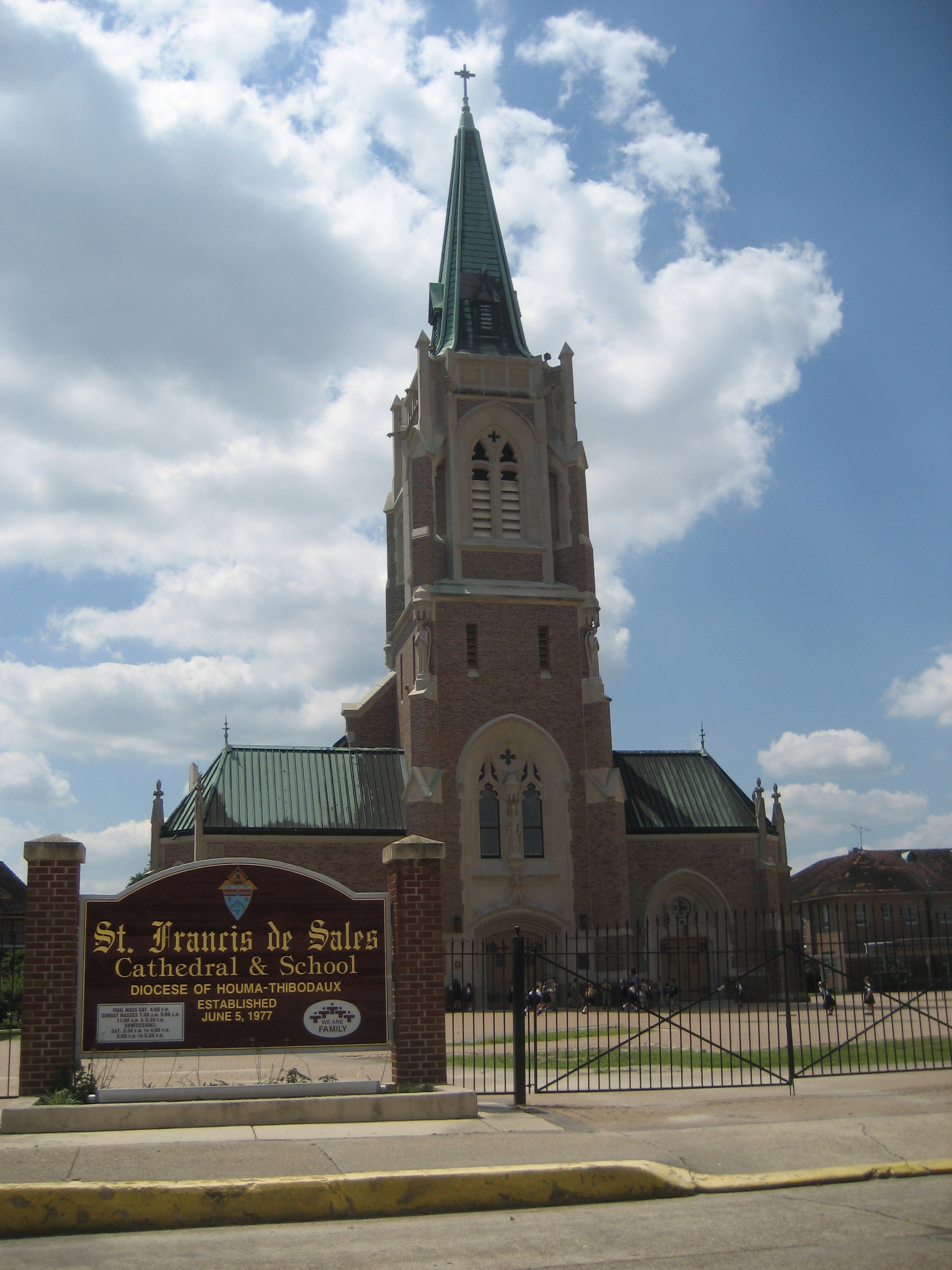
Bishop Warren Louis Boudreaux (683) was the first bishop of Houma-Thibodaux (cathedral pictured).

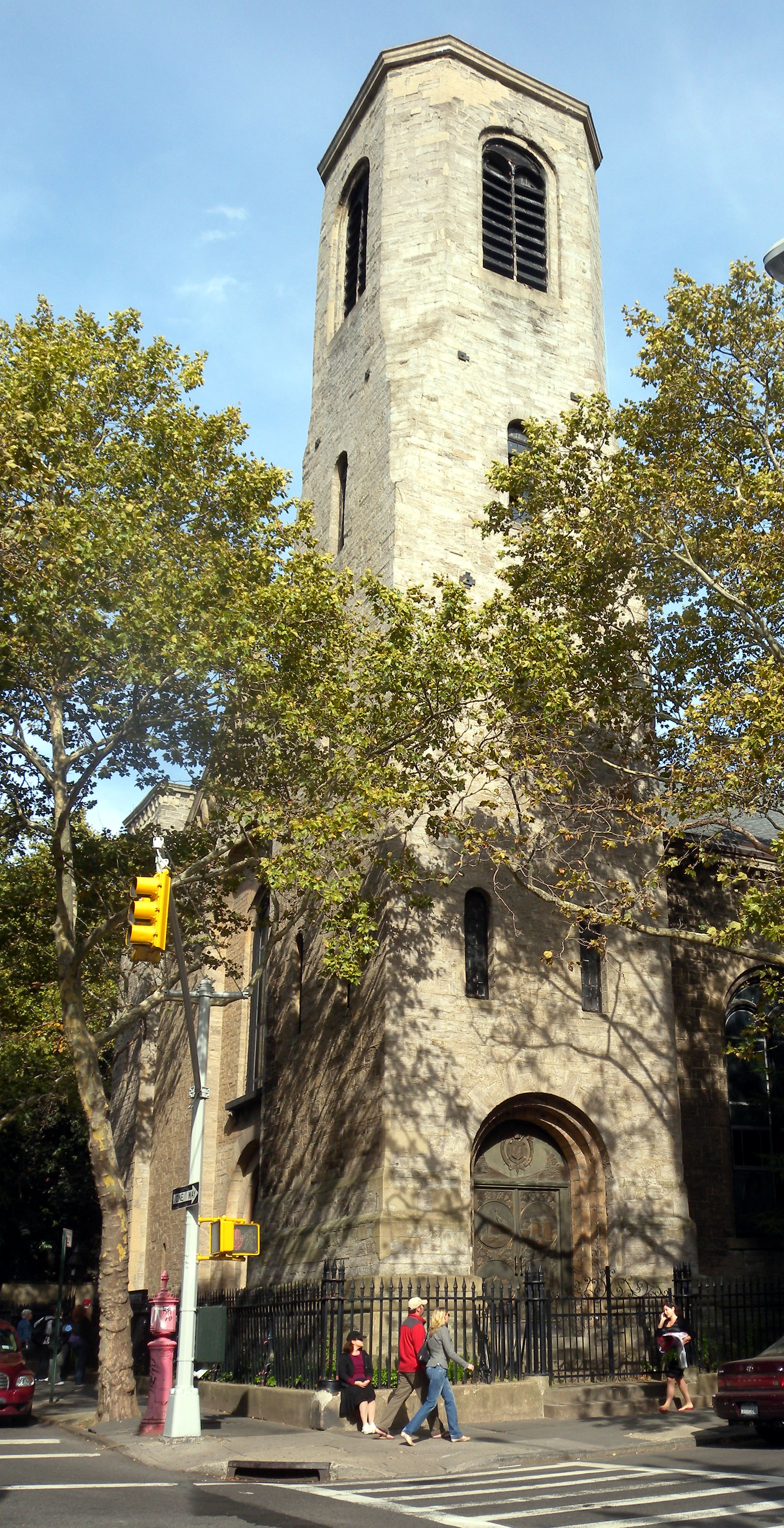
Bishop Francis Mansour Zayek (686) was named the first apostolic exarch for the Maronite Church in the United States in 1962 (cathedral pictured.)

No.	Bishop	Consecrators	Year	Diocese
651	Thomas Joseph Riley	461 564 600	1959	Boston (auxiliary)
652	Joseph Tawil	EH1 EI1 EJ1	1959	II Newton of the Melkites
653	Ernest John Primeau	513 551 593	1960	VI Manchester
654	James John Hogan	559 534 557	1960	Trenton (auxiliary), VI Altoona-Johnstown
655	Vincent Joseph Hines	470 592 585	1960	II Norwich
656	Marion Francis Forst	554 522 599	1960	II Dodge City
657	James William Malone	391 587 597	1960	Youngstown (auxiliary), III Youngstown
658	William G. Connare	EG1° 544 615	1960	II Greensburg
659	Thomas Francis Maloney	EG1° 534 548	1960	Providence (auxiliary)
660	George Albert Hammes	EG1° 484 507	1960	VIII Superior
661	Edward John Harper	492 488 526	1960	I Saint Thomas
662	Edward Ernest Swanstrom	PP261 EK1 EL1	1960	New York (auxiliary)
663	Cletus F. O'Donnell	513 553 653	1960	Chicago (auxiliary), II Madison
664	Aloysius John Wycislo	513 553 653	1960	Chicago (auxiliary), VIII Green Bay
665	Francis James Furey	EG1° 521 577	1960	Philadelphia (auxiliary), II San Diego, VII San Antonio
666	Cletus Joseph Benjamin	EG1° 521 577	1960	Philadelphia (auxiliary)
667	David Monas Maloney	EG1° 410 533	1961	Denver (auxiliary), V Wichita
668	Henry Joseph Soenneker	483 505 536	1961	II Owensboro
669	Gerald Francis O'Keefe	463 528 627	1961	Saint Paul and Minneapolis (auxiliary), VI Davenport
670	John Francis Whealon	EG1° 524 643	1961	Cleveland (auxiliary), VI Erie, X Hartford
671	George Joseph Gottwald	419 527 599	1961	St. Louis (auxiliary)
672	Jaroslav Gabro	486 EM1 624	1961	I Chicago of the Ukrainians
673	Eldon Bernard Schuster	EG1° 440 464	1961	Great Falls (auxiliary), IV Great Falls
674	Thomas Joseph Drury	431 612 613	1962	I San Angelo, IV Corpus Christi
675	Ernest Leo Unterkoefler	EG1° 503 583	1962	Richmond (auxiliary), X Charleston
676	Charles Salatka	EG1° 512 520	1962	Grand Rapids (auxiliary), IX Marquette, VI Oklahoma City
677	Leo Thomas Maher	EG1° 535 567	1962	I Santa Rosa, III San Diego
678	Ignatius Jerome Strecker	501 554 656	1962	II Springfield-Cape Girardeau, VIII Kansas City in Kansas
679	Francis Frederick Reh	415 636 649	1962	IX Charleston, III Saginaw
680	Thomas Austin Murphy	EG1° 558 642	1962	Baltimore (auxiliary)
681	Hugo Mark Gerbermann	EN1 EO1 EP1	1962	San Antonio (auxiliary)
682	Sylvester William Treinen	627 483 578	1962	V Boise
683	Warren Louis Boudreaux	EG1° 527 569	1962	Lafayette in Louisiana (auxiliary), II Beaumont, I Houma-Thibodaux
684	Vincent John Baldwin	589 557 646	1962	Rockville Centre (auxiliary)
685	Gerald Vincent McDevitt	EG1° 521 665	1962	Philadelphia (auxiliary)
686	Francis Mansour Zayek	EQ1 ER1 ES1	1962	I Brooklyn of the Maronites
687	Michael Joseph Green	405 597 676	1962	Lansing (auxiliary), III Reno
688	Raymond Hunthausen	EG1° 464 610	1962	VI Helena, VI Seattle
689	Clarence Edward Elwell	EG1° 524 670	1962	Cleveland (auxiliary), VIII Columbus
690	John Joseph Dougherty	473 534 634	1963	Newark (auxiliary)
691	Joseph Arthur Costello	473 534 634	1963	Newark (auxiliary)
692	George Henry Speltz	517 483 635	1963	Winona (auxiliary), VII Saint Cloud
693	Lawrence Michael De Falco	412 469 588	1963	V Amarillo
694	Jerome J. Hastrich	484 413 507	1963	Madison (auxiliary), II Gallup
695	John J. Ward	476 478 617	1963	Los Angeles (auxiliary)
696	Joseph Thomas Daley	587 438 685	1964	Harrisburg (auxiliary), VI Harrisburg
697	John Joseph Graham	587 438 685	1964	Philadelphia (auxiliary)
698	Bernard Matthew Kelly (Note: Renounced the priesthood in 1971)	548 577 685	1964	Providence (auxiliary)
699	Daniel E. Sheehan	433 576 630	1964	Omaha (auxiliary), VII Omaha
700	Thomas Andrew Donnellan	415 560 649	1964	IX Ogdensburg, III Atlanta

=== 701–750 ===
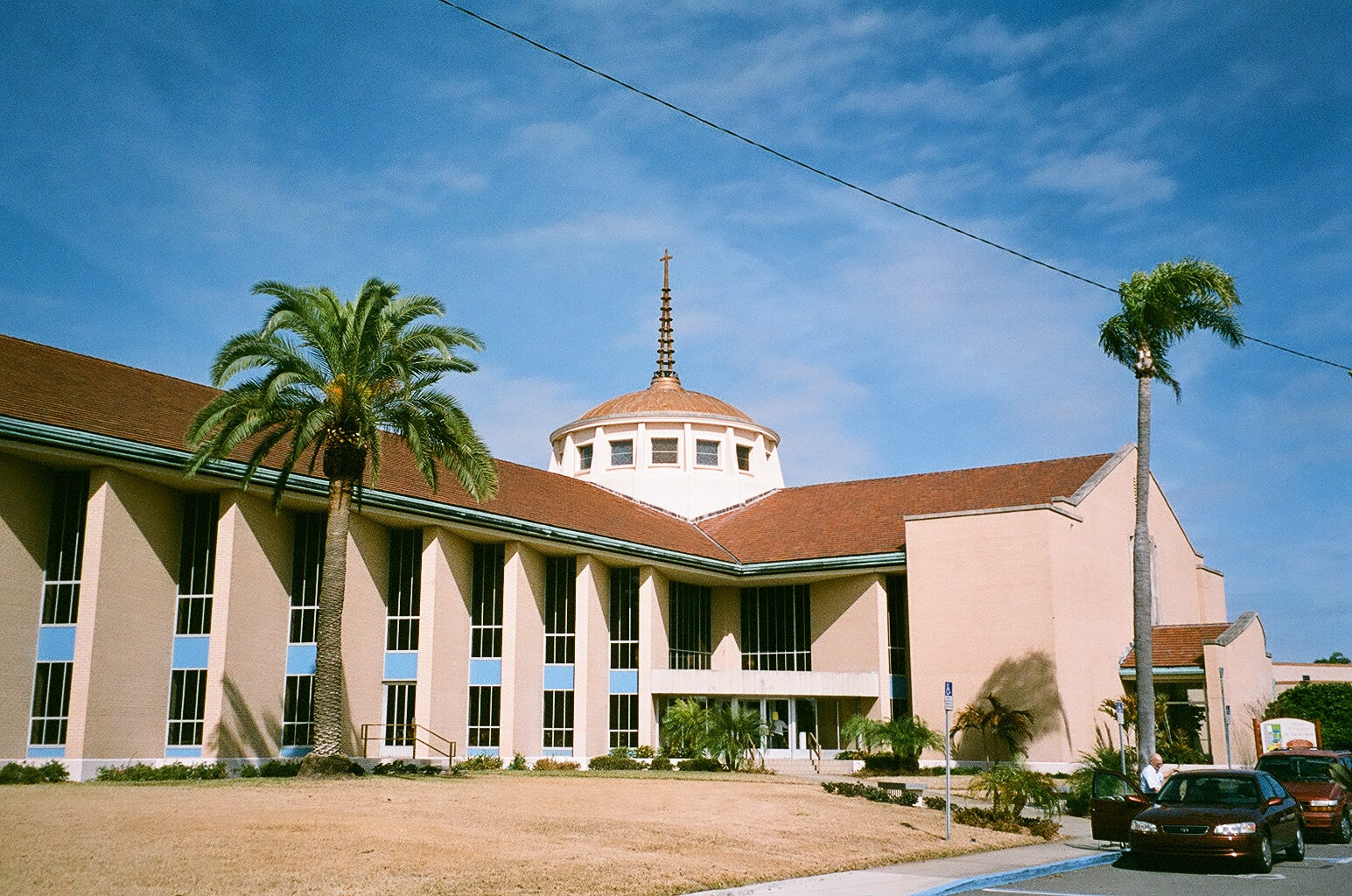
The Diocese of Saint Petersburg was erected in 1968 with Charles Borromeo McLaughlin (701) as its first bishop (cathedral pictured.)

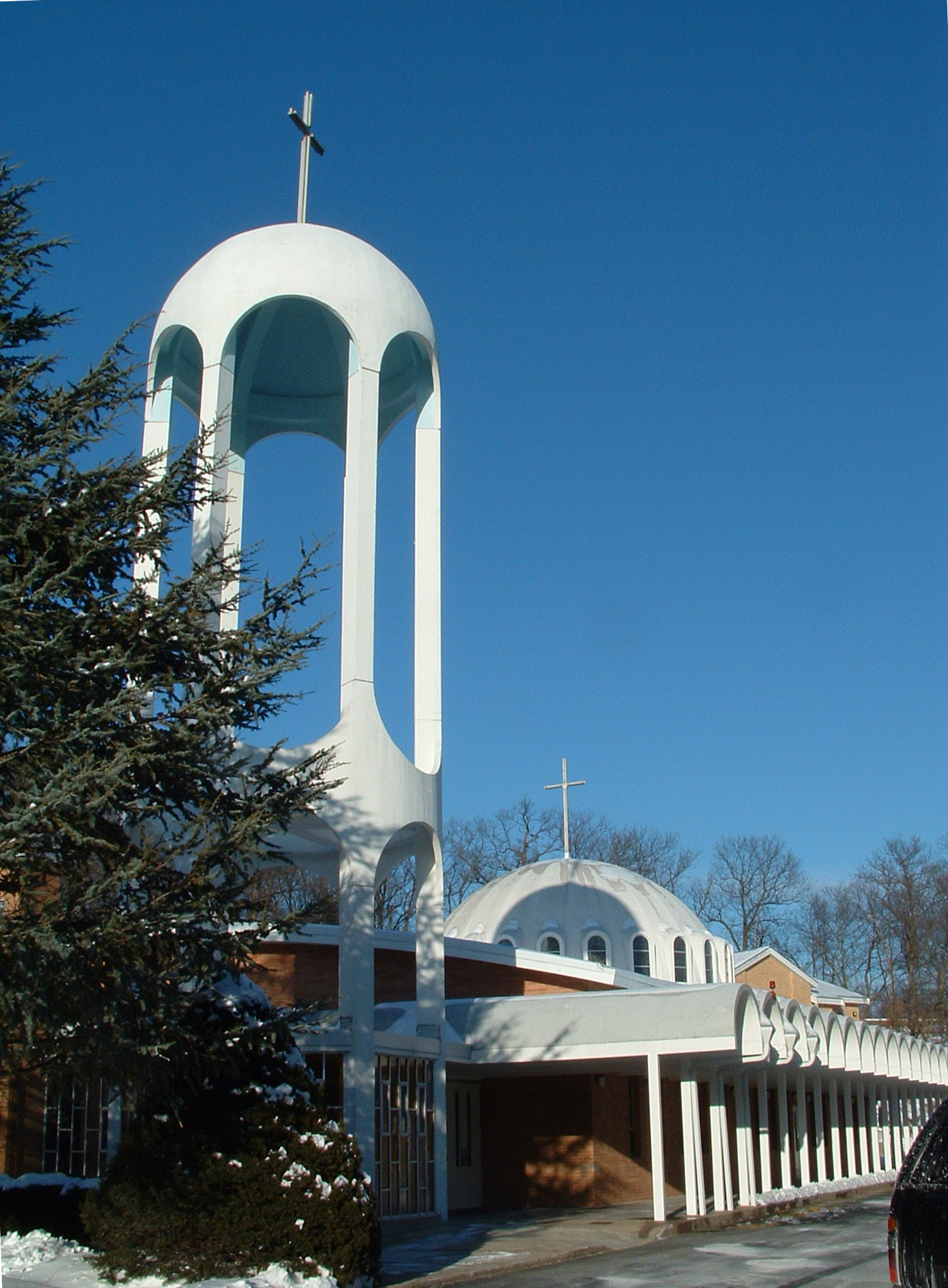
Bishop Justin Najmy (731) was named the first apostolic exarch for the Melkite Greek Catholic Church in the United States in 1968 (cathedral pictured.)

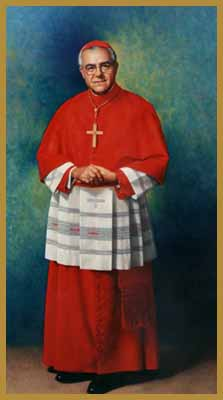
Humberto Sousa Medeiros (733) was cardinal and archbishop of Boston.

No.	Bishop	Consecrators	Year	Diocese
701	Charles Borromeo McLaughlin	503 469 570	1964	I Saint Petersburg
702	Vincent Leonard	525 615 658	1964	Pittsburgh (auxiliary), IX Pittsburgh
703	William Joseph McDonald	EG1° 478 538	1964	Washington (auxiliary), San Francisco (auxiliary)
704	John Selby Spence	EG1° 478 538	1964	Washington (auxiliary)
705	Stanislaus Joseph Brzana	534 581 584	1964	Buffalo (auxiliary), X Ogdensburg
706	Pius Anthony Benincasa	534 581 584	1964	Buffalo (auxiliary)
707	George Theodore Boileau	415 541 575	1964	Fairbanks (coadjutor)
708	George Henry Guilfoyle	415 560 649	1964	New York (auxiliary), IV Camden
709	Joseph Francis Donnelly	470 585 655	1965	Hartford (auxiliary)
710	James P. Shannon (Note: Renounced the priesthood in 1968)	EG1° 487 528	1965	Saint Paul and Minneapolis (auxiliary)
711	Romeo Roy Blanchette	EG1° 553 653	1965	Joliet (auxiliary), II Joliet
712	Frank Henry Greteman	EG1° 528 536	1965	Sioux City (auxiliary), IV Sioux City
713	Edward A. McCarthy	411 502 597	1965	Cincinnati (auxiliary), I Phoenix, II Miami
714	Cyril John Vogel	658 438 702	1965	VII Salina
715	Alfred Michael Watson	587 704 709	1965	Erie (auxiliary), VII Erie
716	Nevin William Hayes	663 592 658	1965	Chicago (auxiliary)
717	Raymond Joseph Gallagher	EG1° 597 599	1965	III Lafayette in Indiana
718	Loras Joseph Watters	EG1° 528 630	1965	Dubuque (auxiliary), V Winona
719	William Joseph Moran	415 478 649	1965	Military Vicar of the United States (auxiliary)
720	Terence Cooke*	415 478 649	1965	New York (auxiliary), X New York
721	Joseph M. Breitenbeck	544 603 685	1965	Detroit (auxiliary), VIII Grand Rapids
722	Paul Francis Tanner	EG1° 538 552	1966	VII St. Augustine
723	Harold Robert Perry	EG1° 527 619	1966	New Orleans (auxiliary)
724	Jerome Arthur Pechillo	521 502 579	1966	Newark (auxiliary)
725	Thomas Ambrose Tschoepe	412 566 693	1966	II San Angelo, V Dallas
726	John Joseph Thomas Ryan	415 632 662	1966	I Anchorage, V Military Vicar of the United States
727	James Edward Michaels	487 ET1 553	1966	Wheeling-Charleston (auxiliary)
728	Edward John Herrmann	538 619 703	1966	Washington (auxiliary), IX Columbus
729	Joseph Bernardin*	643 675 679	1966	Atlanta (auxiliary), VIII Cincinnati, XI Chicago
730	Joseph Gregory Vath	EG1° 511 537	1966	Mobile-Birmingham (auxiliary), I Birmingham
731	Justin Najmy	EU1 EV1 EW1	1966	I Newton of the Melkites
732	Peter Leo Gerety	470 516 585	1966	VIII Portland in Maine, VII Newark
733	Humberto Sousa Medeiros*	504 644 685	1966	II Brownsville, VII Boston
734	Nicholas D'Antonio Salza	510 CX1 CY1	1966	New Orleans (auxiliary)
735	John Bernard McDowell	525 658 702	1966	Pittsburgh (auxiliary)
736	Vincent Madeley Harris	613 599 654	1966	I Beaumont, II Austin
737	James Louis Flaherty	558 503 583	1966	Richmond (auxiliary)
738	James Louis Schad	584 654 706	1966	Camden (auxiliary)
739	Thomas Mardaga	510 558 680	1967	Baltimore (auxiliary), VI Wilmington
740	Joseph Vincent Sullivan	554 527 530	1967	Kansas City-Saint Joseph (auxiliary), II Baton Rouge
741	James Aloysius Hickey*	544 452 612	1967	Saginaw (auxiliary), VIII Cleveland, IV Washington
742	Edwin Broderick	415 708 720	1967	New York (auxiliary), VIII Albany
743	James E.C. Burke	461 633 662	1967	Wilmington (auxiliary)
744	Gerard Louis Frey	619 511 648	1967	XI Savannah, III Lafayette in Louisiana
745	Thomas Joseph Grady	527 663 664	1967	Chicago (auxiliary), II Orlando
746	William Edward McManus	527 663 664	1967	Chicago (auxiliary), VII Fort Wayne-South Bend
747	John L. May	527 663 664	1967	Chicago (auxiliary), VII Mobile, VII St. Louis
748	John R. Quinn	BB2° 635 665	1967	San Diego (auxiliary), V Oklahoma City, VI San Francisco
749	John C. Reiss	559 654 663	1967	Trenton (auxiliary), VIII Trenton
750	Mark Joseph Hurley (Note: Bishops Mark Joseph Hurley (750) and Francis Thomas Hurley (786) were brothers.)	478 535 653	1968	San Francisco (auxiliary), II Santa Rosa

=== 751–800 ===
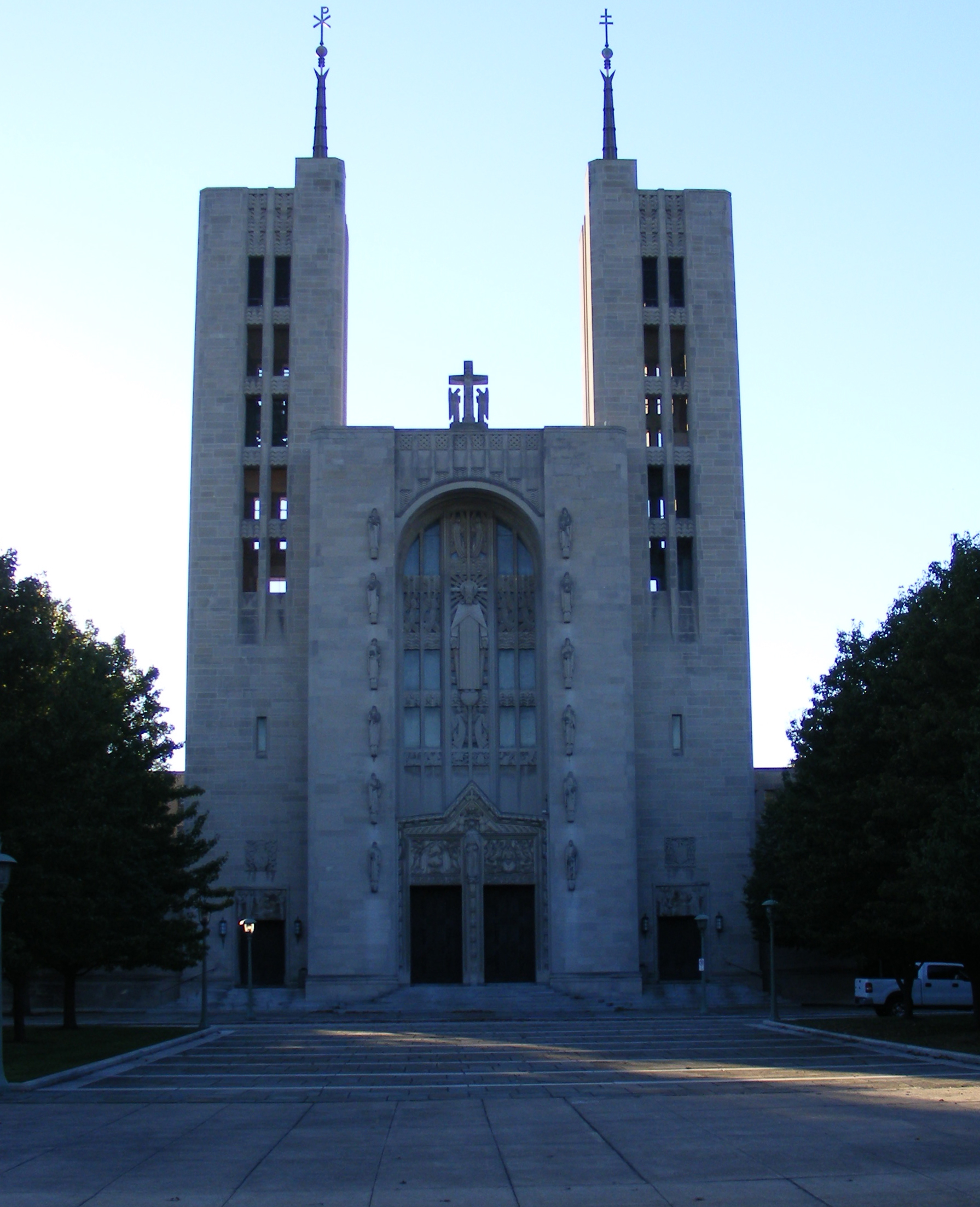
William Donald Borders (761) was the first bishop of Orlando and the thirteenth archbishop of Baltimore (Baltimore's cathedral pictured.)

Archbishop emeritus William Wakefield Baum (791) is the United States' longest-serving cardinal (arms pictured.)

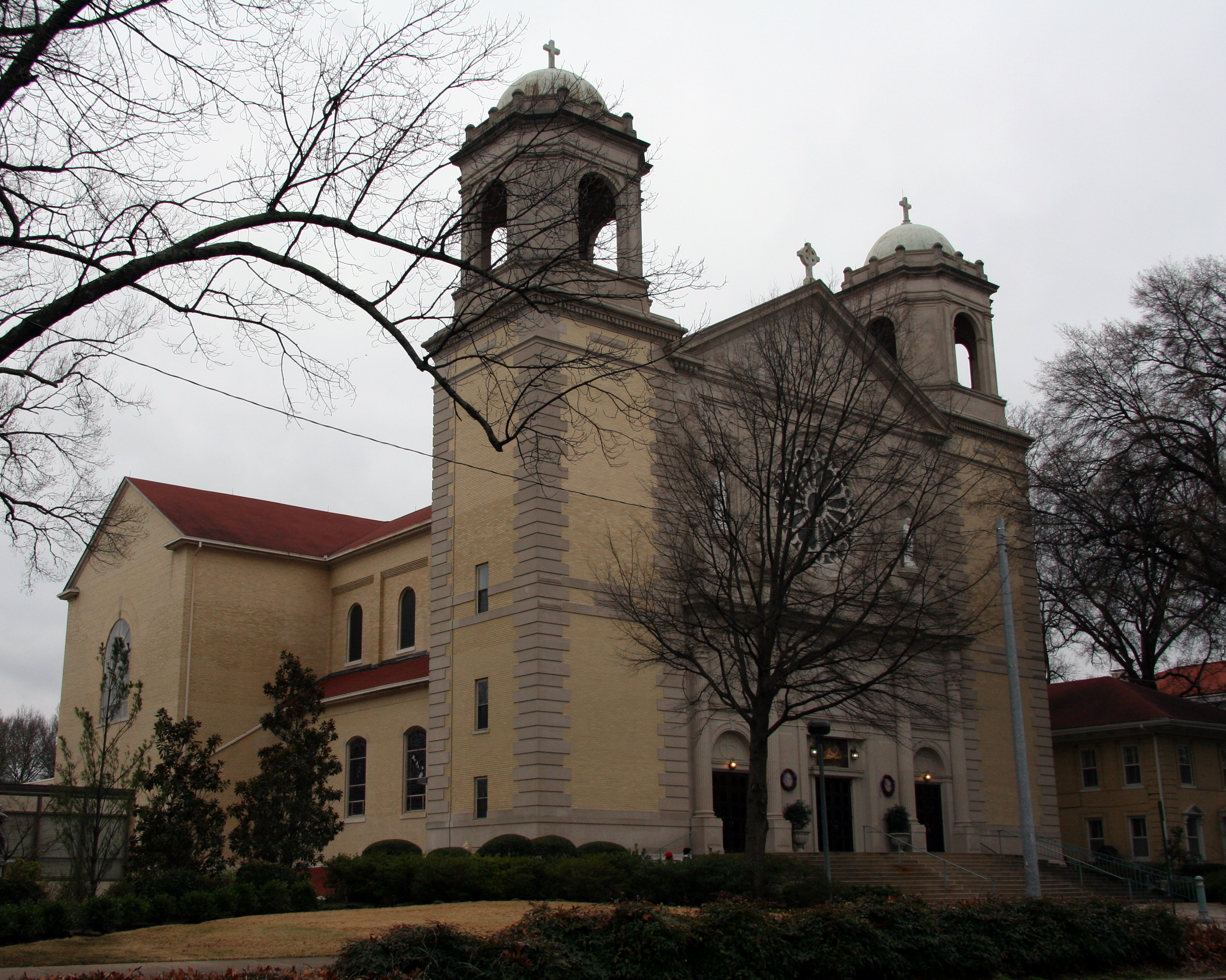
The diocese of Memphis was erected in 1971 with Carroll Thomas Dozier (799) as its first bishop (cathedral pictured.)

No.	Bishop	Consecrators	Year	Diocese
751	James Richard Ham	EZ1 EO2 FA1	1968	Saint Paul and Minneapolis (auxiliary)
752	Robert Louis Whelan	BB2° 541 726	1968	II Fairbanks
753	Dennis Walter Hickey	BB2° 417 571	1968	Rochester (auxiliary)
754	John Edgar McCafferty	BB2° 417 571	1968	Rochester (auxiliary)
755	Raymond James Vonesh	527 663 711	1968	Joliet (auxiliary)
756	Walter Joseph Schoenherr	544 561 721	1968	Detroit (auxiliary)
757	Thomas Gumbleton	544 561 721	1968	Detroit (auxiliary)
758	John Joseph Cassata	412 613 712	1968	Dallas-Fort Worth (auxiliary), I Fort Worth
759	Alfred Leo Abramowicz	527 653 663	1968	Chicago (auxiliary)
760	Michael R.P. Dempsey	527 653 663	1968	Chicago (auxiliary)
761	William Donald Borders	BB2° 537 648	1968	I Orlando, XIII Baltimore
762	Maurice John Dingman	BB2° 425 669	1968	VI Des Moines
763	Timothy Joseph Harrington	592 525 560	1968	Worcester (auxiliary), III Worcester
764	John Joseph Fitzpatrick	591 608 729	1968	Miami (auxiliary), III Brownsville
765	William Michael Cosgrove	597 670 723	1968	Cleveland (auxiliary), IV Belleville
766	F. Joseph Gossman	510 680 739	1968	Baltimore (auxiliary), IV Raleigh
767	Daniel Anthony Cronin	461 600 651	1968	Boston (auxiliary), V Fall River, XI Hartford
768	Francis Mugavero	BB2° 579 720	1968	V Brooklyn
769	Joseph Crescent McKinney	544 520 676	1968	Grand Rapids (auxiliary)
770	Arthur Joseph O'Neill	BB2° 487 528	1968	VII Rockford
771	Paul Francis Anderson	578 505 651	1968	V Duluth
772	Michael Dudick	622 FB1 FC1	1968	II Passaic of the Byzantines
773	Bernard Joseph McLaughlin	PP262 FD1 FE1	1969	Buffalo (auxiliary)
774	Joseph Alphonse McNicholas	618 554 599	1969	St. Louis (auxiliary), VI Springfield in Illinois
775	George Roche Evans	BB2° 533 630	1969	Denver (auxiliary)
776	Lawrence Preston Joseph Graves	469 683 693	1969	Little Rock (auxiliary), VII Alexandria
777	Cornelius Michael Power	462 574 616	1969	II Yakima, VII Portland in Oregon
778	Emil John Mihalik	622 772 FC1	1969	I Parma of the Byzantines
779	Michael Francis McAuliffe	BB2° 530 554	1969	II Jefferson City
780	Francis John Dunn	528 487 517	1969	Dubuque (auxiliary)
781	Leo Joseph Brust	552 555 694	1969	Milwaukee (auxiliary)
782	Harold Joseph Dimmerling	692 483 488	1969	V Rapid City
783	Joseph Lloyd Hogan	BB2° 571 586	1969	VII Rochester
784	George Edward Lynch	503 570 701	1970	Raleigh (auxiliary)
785	Francis Raymond Shea	BB2° 608 629	1970	III Evansville
786	Francis Thomas Hurley	750 526 729	1970	II Juneau, II Anchorage
787	Patrick Ahern	720 649 742	1970	New York (auxiliary)
788	Edward D. Head	720 649 742	1970	New York (auxiliary), XI Buffalo
789	Martin Nicholas Lohmuller	587 685 697	1970	Philadelphia (auxiliary)
790	Thomas Jerome Welsh	587 685 697	1970	Philadelphia (auxiliary), I Arlington, II Allentown
791	William Wakefield Baum*	618 554 740	1970	III Springfield-Cape Girardeau, III Washington
792	Patrick Flores	BB2° 613 665	1970	San Antonio (auxiliary), III El Paso, VIII San Antonio
793	Mark Francis Schmitt	664 555 635	1970	Green Bay (auxiliary), X Marquette
794	Anthony G. Bosco	525 702 735	1970	Pittsburgh (auxiliary), III Greensburg
795	Norman Francis McFarland	478 535 567	1970	San Francisco (auxiliary), IV Reno, II Orange
796	Kenneth Joseph Povish	BB2° 679 741	1970	V Crookston, III Lansing
797	Justin Albert Driscoll	BB2° 487 528	1970	V Fargo
798	Walter Francis Sullivan	558 583 675	1970	Richmond (auxiliary), XI Richmond
799	Carroll Thomas Dozier	525 BB2° 523	1971	I Memphis
800	John R. McGann	589 646 684	1971	Rockville Centre (auxiliary), II Rockville Centre

=== 801–850 ===
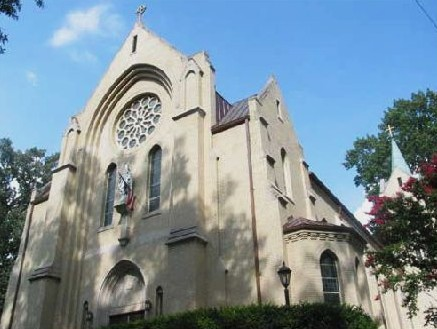
The diocese of Charlotte was erected in 1971 with Michael Joseph Begley (815) as its first bishop (cathedral pictured.)

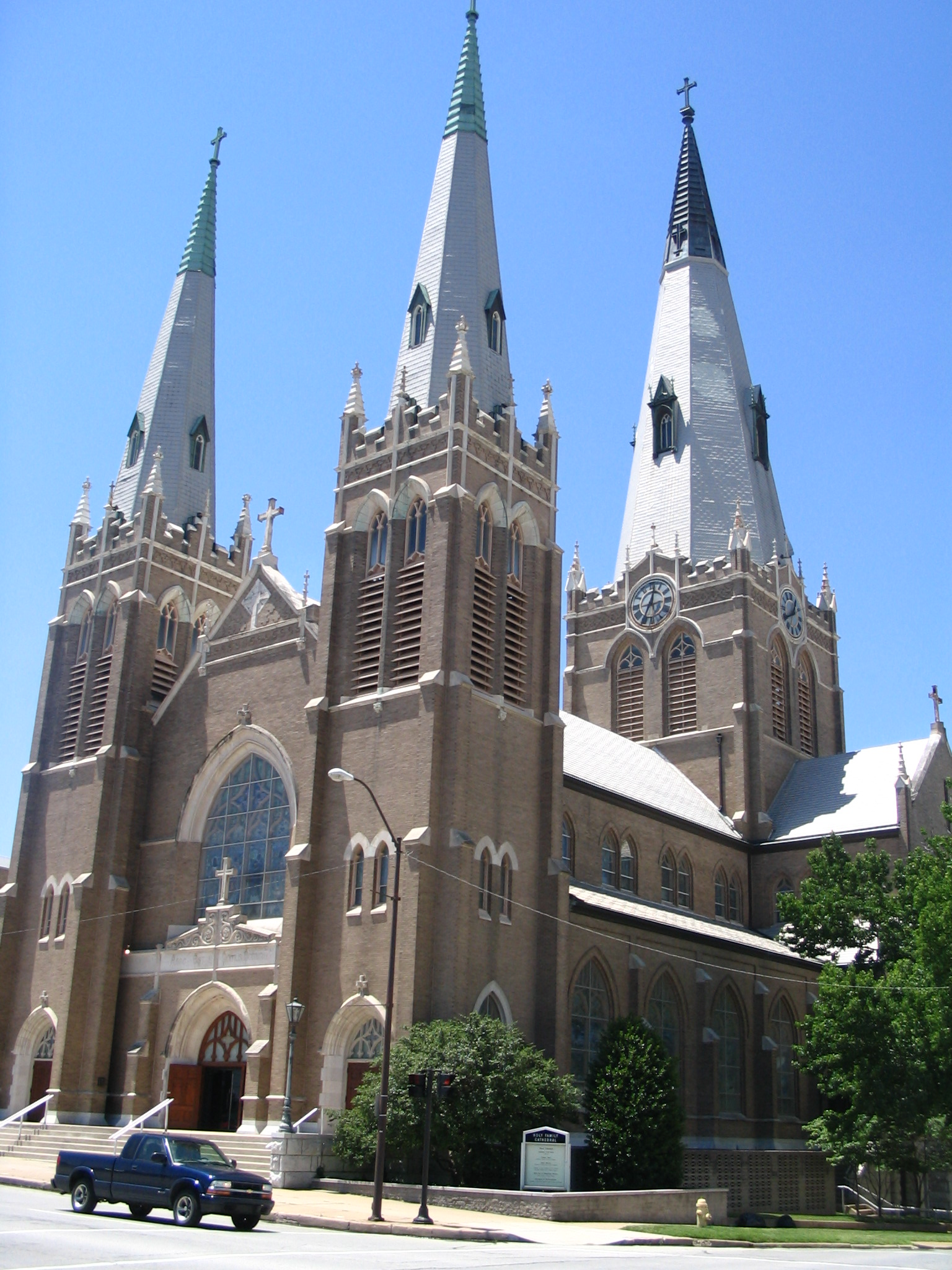
Bernard J. Ganter (828) became the first bishop of Tulsa in 1972 (cathedral pictured.)

Bernard Cardinal Law (835) was archbishop of Boston until 2002 (arms pictured.)

No.	Bishop	Consecrators	Year	Diocese
801	Edward Cornelius O'Leary	732 592 776	1971	Portland in Maine (auxiliary), IX Portland in Maine
802	Charles Roman Koester	618 631 776	1971	St. Louis (auxiliary)
803	Juan Alfredo Arzube	518 478 617	1971	Los Angeles (auxiliary)
804	William Robert Johnson	518 478 617	1971	Los Angeles (auxiliary), I Orange
805	Francis James Harrison	562 705 783	1971	Syracuse (auxiliary), VII Syracuse
806	John Stock	486 672 772	1971	Philadelphia of the Ukrainians (auxiliary)
807	Basil H. Losten	486 672 772	1971	III Stamford of the Ukrainians
808	Thomas Joseph Connolly	580 412 687	1971	IV Baker
809	Edward William O'Rourke	527 573 692	1971	VI Peoria
810	Edmund Szoka*	544 676 769	1971	I Gaylord, VII Detroit
811	Paul Vincent Donovan	544 561 687	1971	I Kalamazoo
812	Joseph Robert Crowley	629 566 626	1971	Fort Wayne-South Bend (auxiliary)
813	John Roach	BB2° 487 599	1971	Saint Paul and Minneapolis (auxiliary), VIII Saint Paul and Minneapolis
814	Raymond Alphonse Lucker	BB2° 487 599	1971	Saint Paul and Minneapolis (auxiliary), II New Ulm
815	Michael Joseph Begley	BB2° 503 784	1972	I Charlotte
816	John Aloysius Marshall	605 592 741	1972	VII Burlington, VI Springfield in Massachusetts
817	René Henry Gracida	544 591 722	1972	Miami (auxiliary), I Pensacola-Tallahassee, V Corpus Christi
818	Louis Edward Gelineau	605 592 801	1972	VI Providence
819	Lawrence Joseph Riley	733 600 651	1972	Boston (auxiliary)
820	Joseph Francis Maguire	733 600 651	1972	Boston (auxiliary), V Springfield in Massachusetts
821	Edward Thomas O'Meara	PP262 FF1 FG1	1972	St. Louis (auxiliary), X Indianapolis
822	Andrew Joseph McDonald	523 619 744	1972	V Little Rock
823	James Patrick Mahoney	720 649 787	1972	New York (auxiliary)
824	John Joseph Sullivan	748 650 747	1972	V Grand Island, VI Kansas City-Saint Joseph
825	James Stephen Sullivan	561 687 811	1972	Lansing (auxiliary), VI Fargo
826	Joseph Lawson Howze	BB2° 625 723	1973	Natchez-Jackson (auxiliary), I Biloxi
827	John J. Snyder	768 579 FH1	1973	Brooklyn (auxiliary), VIII St. Augustine
828	Bernard J. Ganter	BB2° 540 613	1973	I Tulsa, III Beaumont
829	Joseph Leopold Imesch	544 756 757	1973	Detroit (auxiliary), III Joliet
830	Arthur Henry Krawczak	544 756 757	1973	Detroit (auxiliary)
831	James Steven Rausch	587 692 729	1973	Saint Cloud (auxiliary), II Phoenix
832	Anthony Francis Mestice	720 596 649	1973	New York (auxiliary)
833	Raymond W. Lessard	700 766 797	1973	XII Savannah
834	John Bilock	622 772 778	1973	Pittsburgh of the Byzantines (auxiliary)
835	Bernard Francis Law*	625 729 791	1973	IV Springfield-Cape Girardeau, VIII Boston
836	John Stephen Cummins	617 524 535	1974	Sacramento (auxiliary), II Oakland
837	Albert Henry Ottenweller	603 729 765	1974	Toledo (auxiliary), II Steubenville
838	Gilbert Espinosa Chávez	677 748 792	1974	San Diego (auxiliary)
839	Robert Fortune Sanchez	FI1° 493 792	1974	X Santa Fe
840	Thomas William Lyons	791 723 728	1974	Washington (auxiliary)
841	Eugene Antonio Marino	791 723 728	1974	Washington (auxiliary), III Atlanta
842	William Anthony Hughes	657 729 765	1974	Youngstown (auxiliary), VIII Covington
843	Richard Charles Patrick Hanifen	630 650 775	1974	Denver (auxiliary), I Colorado Springs
844	Kenneth Anthony Angell	818 585 670	1974	Providence (auxiliary), VIII Burlington
845	Nicolas Eugene Walsh	682 528 FJ1	1974	III Yakima, Seattle (auxiliary)
846	Daniel Edward Pilarczyk	729 607 657	1974	Cincinnati (auxiliary), IX Cincinnati
847	Odore Joseph Gendron	653 763 801	1975	VII Manchester
848	Thomas Vose Daily	733 651 819	1975	Boston (auxiliary), I Palm Beach, VI Brooklyn
849	John Michael D'Arcy	733 651 819	1975	Boston (auxiliary), VIII Fort Wayne-South Bend
850	Joseph John Ruocco	733 651 819	1975	Boston (auxiliary)

=== 851–900 ===
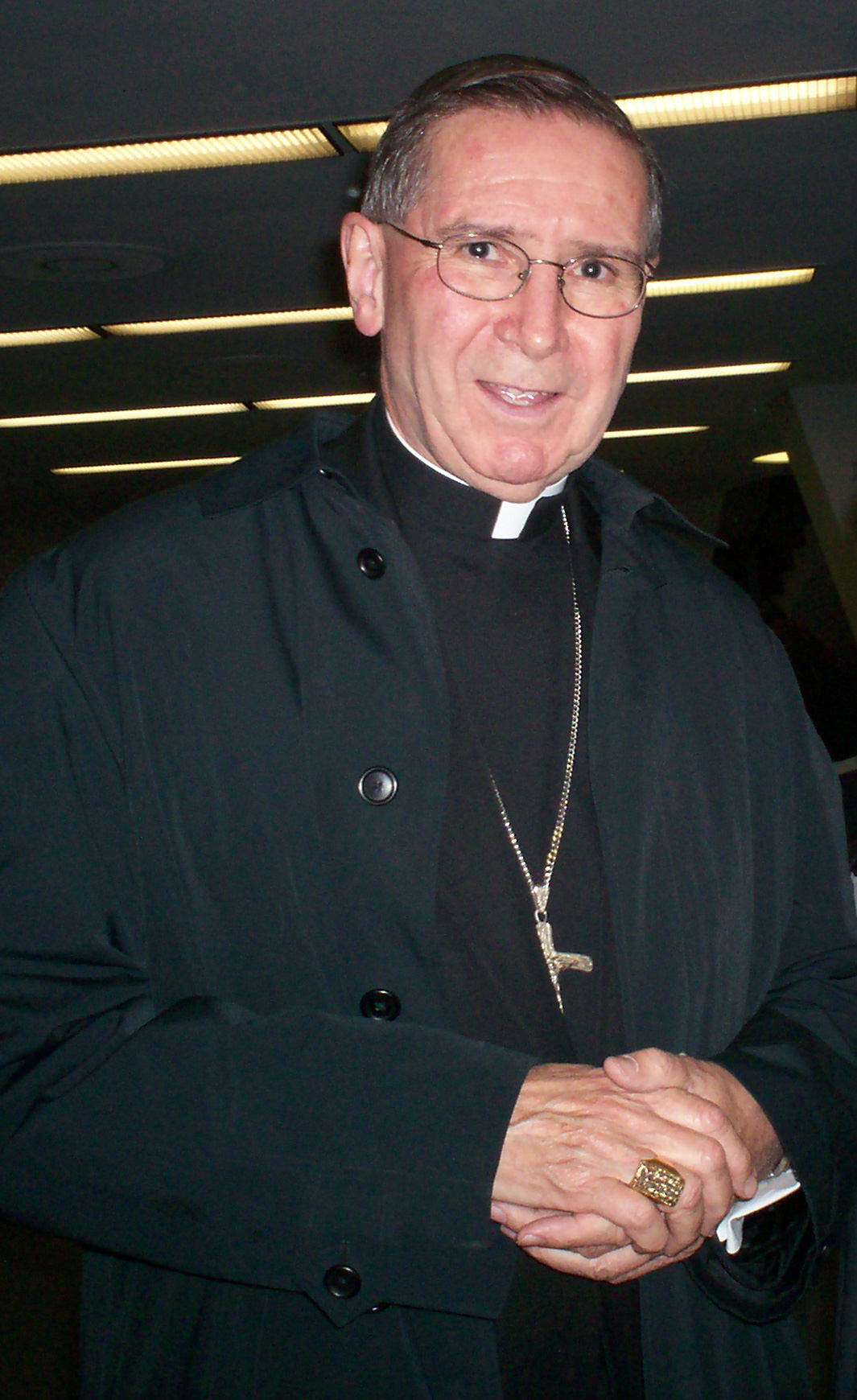
Roger Cardinal Mahoney (852) served as archbishop of Los Angeles and now resides in Rome.

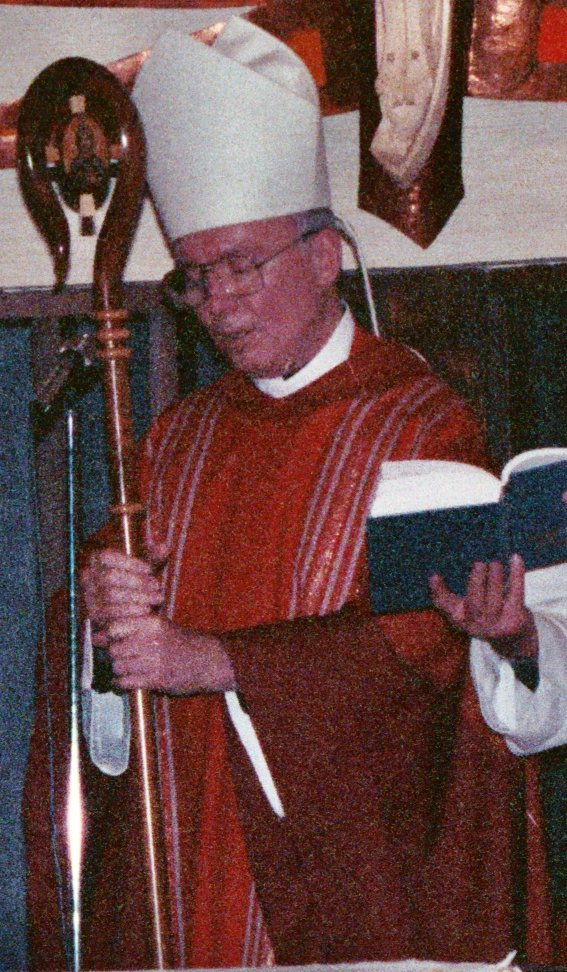
James Cardinal Stafford (860) was the archbishop of Denver, having previously served as bishop of Memphis.

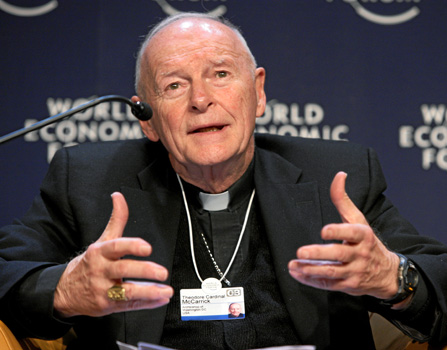
Theodore Edgar McCarrick (887) was the founding bishop of Metuchen and went on to serve as cardinal and archbishop of Washington. He was the first cardinal laicized for sexual abuse of minors.

No.	Bishop	Consecrators	Year	Diocese
851	John Joseph Mulcahy	733 651 819	1975	Boston (auxiliary)
852	Roger Mahony*	535 804 836	1975	Fresno (auxiliary), III Stockton, XI Los Angeles
853	James Daniel Niedergeses	523 608 785	1975	IX Nashville
854	Norbert Felix Gaughan	658 714 735	1975	Greensburg (auxiliary), II Gary
855	George Kinzie Fitzsimons	554 740 791	1975	Kansas City-Saint Joseph (auxiliary), IX Salina
856	Daniel Patrick Reilly	670 655 818	1975	III Norwich, IV Worcester
857	Amédée Wilfrid Proulx	801 763 847	1975	Portland in Maine (auxiliary)
858	James Jerome Killeen	720 719 726	1975	Military Vicar of the United States (auxiliary)
859	Philip Francis Murphy	761 510 680	1976	Baltimore (auxiliary)
860	James Stafford*	761 510 680	1976	Baltimore (auxiliary), II Memphis, VI Denver
861	Elden Francis Curtiss	777 563 808	1976	VII Helena, VIII Omaha
862	Michael Joseph Murphy	741 729 597	1976	Cleveland (auxiliary), VIII Erie
863	Gilbert Sheldon	741 729 597	1976	Cleveland (auxiliary), III Steubenville
864	Robert Francis Garner	732 473 723	1976	Newark (auxiliary)
865	Joseph Abel Francis	732 473 723	1976	Newark (auxiliary)
866	Dominic Anthony Marconi	732 473 723	1976	Newark (auxiliary)
867	Stanley Joseph Ott	619 740 761	1976	New Orleans (auxiliary), III Baton Rouge
868	George Avis Fulcher	728 729 741	1976	Columbus (auxiliary), IV Lafayette in Indiana
869	Edward Hughes	587 685 697	1976	Philadelphia (auxiliary), II Metuchen
870	John Nicholas Wurm	618 554 774	1976	St. Louis (auxiliary), V Belleville
871	Joseph Hubert Hart	533 554 779	1976	Cheyenne (auxiliary), VI Cheyenne
872	Victor Hermann Balke	813 553 774	1976	VI Crookston
873	James Clifford Timlin	521 748 867	1976	Scranton (auxiliary), VIII Scranton
874	Daniel Anthony Hart	733 651 819	1976	Boston (auxiliary), IV Norwich
875	Thomas Dolinay	622 772 778	1976	I Van Nuys of the Byzantines, (Note: Later renamed Byzantine Catholic Eparchy of Phoenix) V Pittsburgh of the Byzantines
876	Raymundo Joseph Peña	665 674 792	1976	San Antonio (auxiliary), IV El Paso, V Brownsville
877	Eugene John Gerber	667 656 843	1976	III Dodge City, VI Wichita
878	Paul Vincent Dudley	813 487 751	1977	Saint Paul and Minneapolis (auxiliary), VI Sioux Falls
879	John Francis Kinney	813 487 751	1977	Saint Paul and Minneapolis (auxiliary), V Bismarck, IX Saint Cloud
880	Manuel Duran Moreno	518 695 803	1977	Los Angeles (auxiliary), V Tucson
881	Thaddeus Anthony Shubsda	518 695 803	1977	Los Angeles (auxiliary), XII Monterey
882	Howard James Hubbard	720 632 742	1977	IX Albany
883	Robert Edward Mulvee	847 585 653	1977	Manchester (auxiliary), VII Wilmington, VII Providence
884	Gerald Augustine John Ryan	800 589 684	1977	Rockville Centre (auxiliary)
885	James Joseph Daly	800 589 684	1977	Rockville Centre (auxiliary)
886	William S. Skylstad	688 610 835	1977	IV Yakima, V Spokane
887 (Note: Resigned from the College of Cardinals and later laicized)	Theodore Edgar McCarrick	720 649 787	1977	New York (auxiliary), I Metuchen, VIII Newark, V Washington
888	Austin Bernard Vaughan	720 649 787	1977	New York (auxiliary)
889	Francisco Garmendia Ayestarán	720 649 787	1977	New York (auxiliary)
890	Daniel Kucera	711 626 755	1977	Joliet (auxiliary), VIII Salina, X Dubuque
891	John Joseph Paul	635 770 793	1977	La Crosse (auxiliary), VII La Crosse
892	Thomas C. Kelly	729 831 841	1977	Washington (auxiliary), IX Louisville
893	Rembert Weakland	FI1° 552 658	1977	IX Milwaukee
894	Joseph Anthony Ferrario	601 748 873	1978	Honolulu (auxiliary), III Honolulu
895	Frank Joseph Rodimer	732 729 FK1	1978	VI Paterson
896	Paul E. Waldschmidt	777 861 FL1	1978	Portland in Oregon (auxiliary)
897	Kenneth Steiner	777 861 FL1	1978	Portland in Oregon (auxiliary)
898	George Otto Wirz	663 694 893	1978	Madison (auxiliary)
899	Thomas Joseph Costello	805 562 768	1978	Syracuse (auxiliary)
900	Lawrence James McNamara	699 554 824	1978	VI Grand Island

=== 901–950 ===
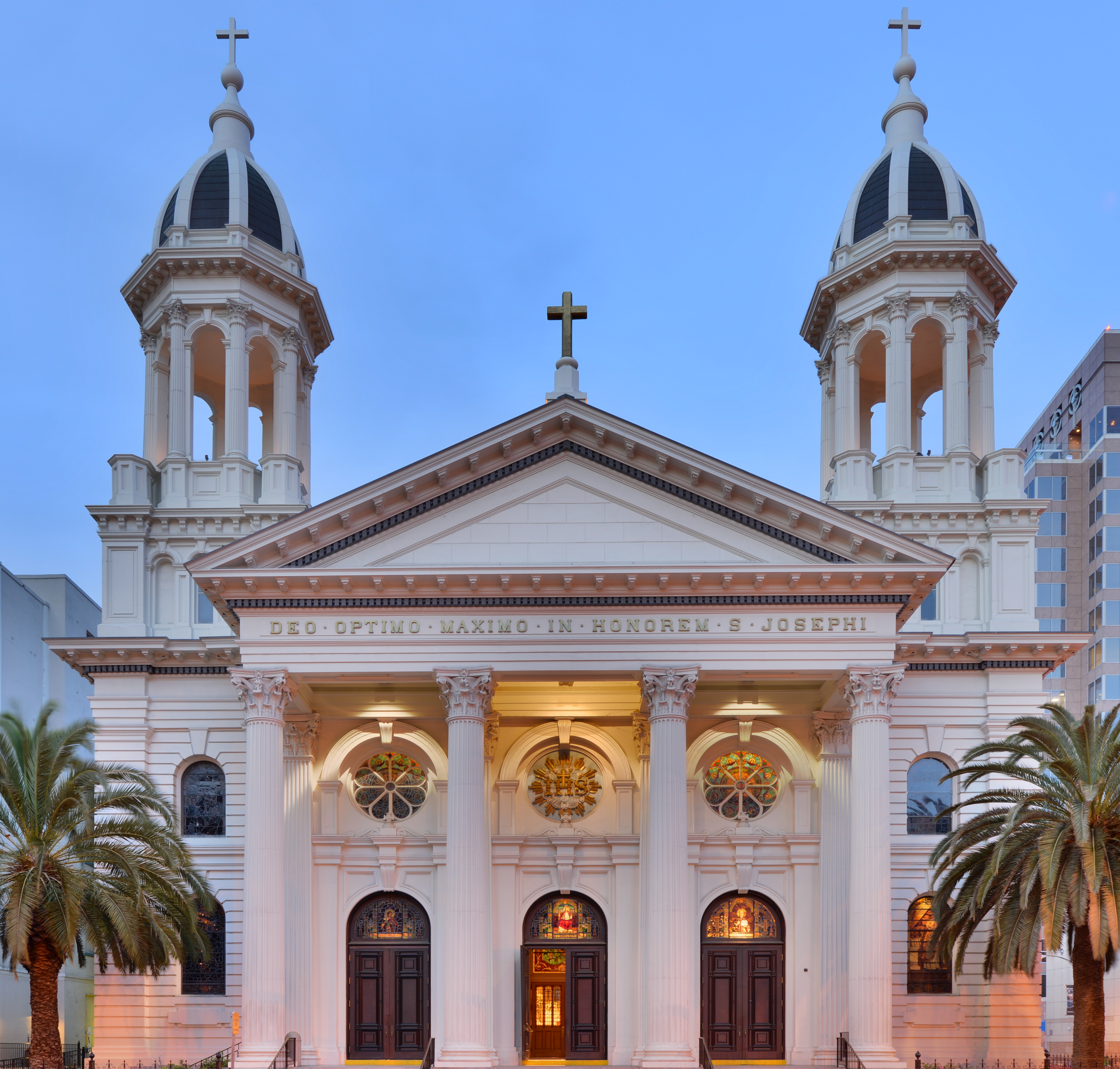
The diocese of San Jose in California was erected in 1981 with Pierre DuMaine (905) as its first bishop (cathedral pictured.)

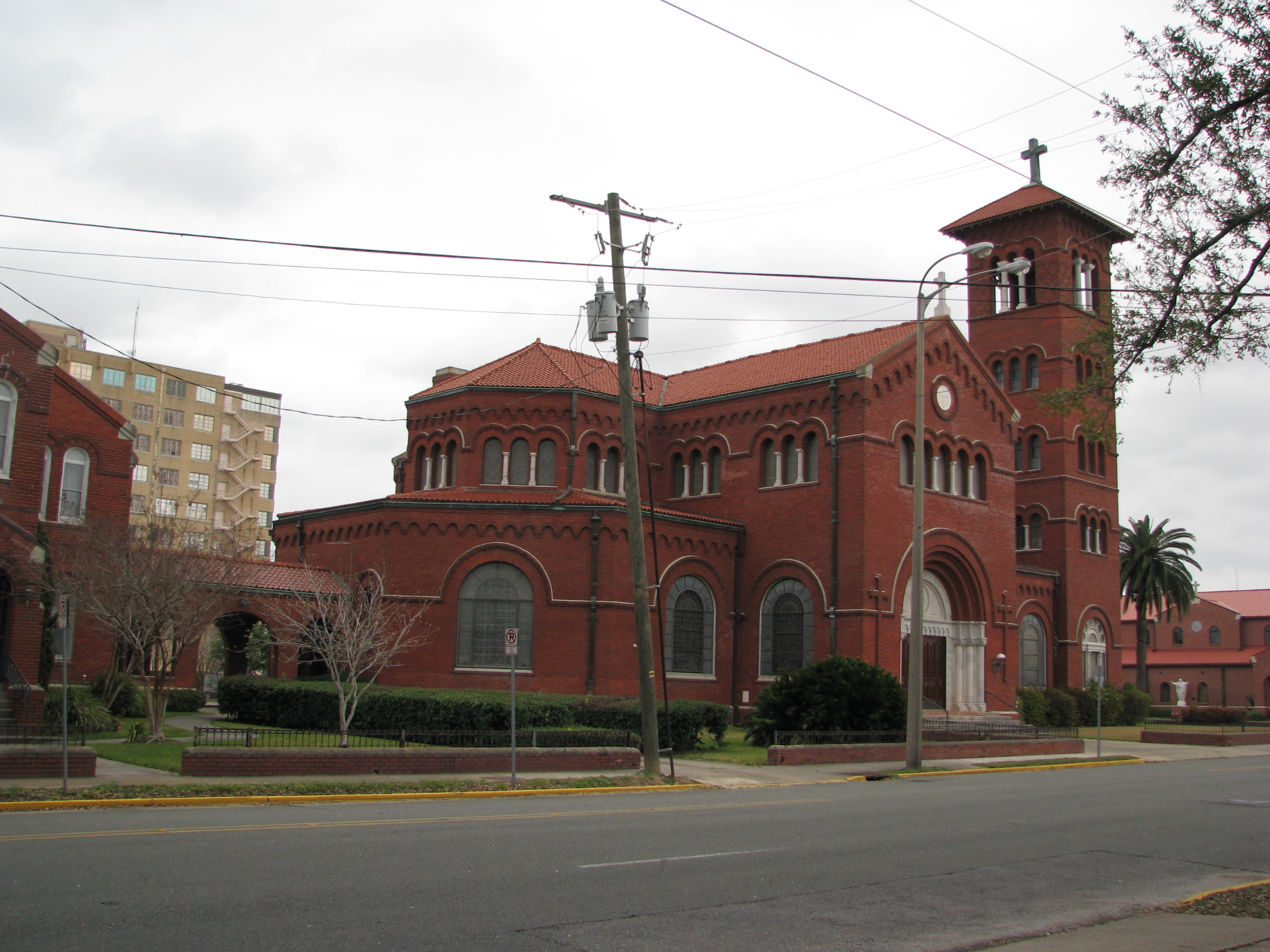
Jude Speyrer (929) became the first bishop of Lake Charles in 1980 (cathedral pictured.)

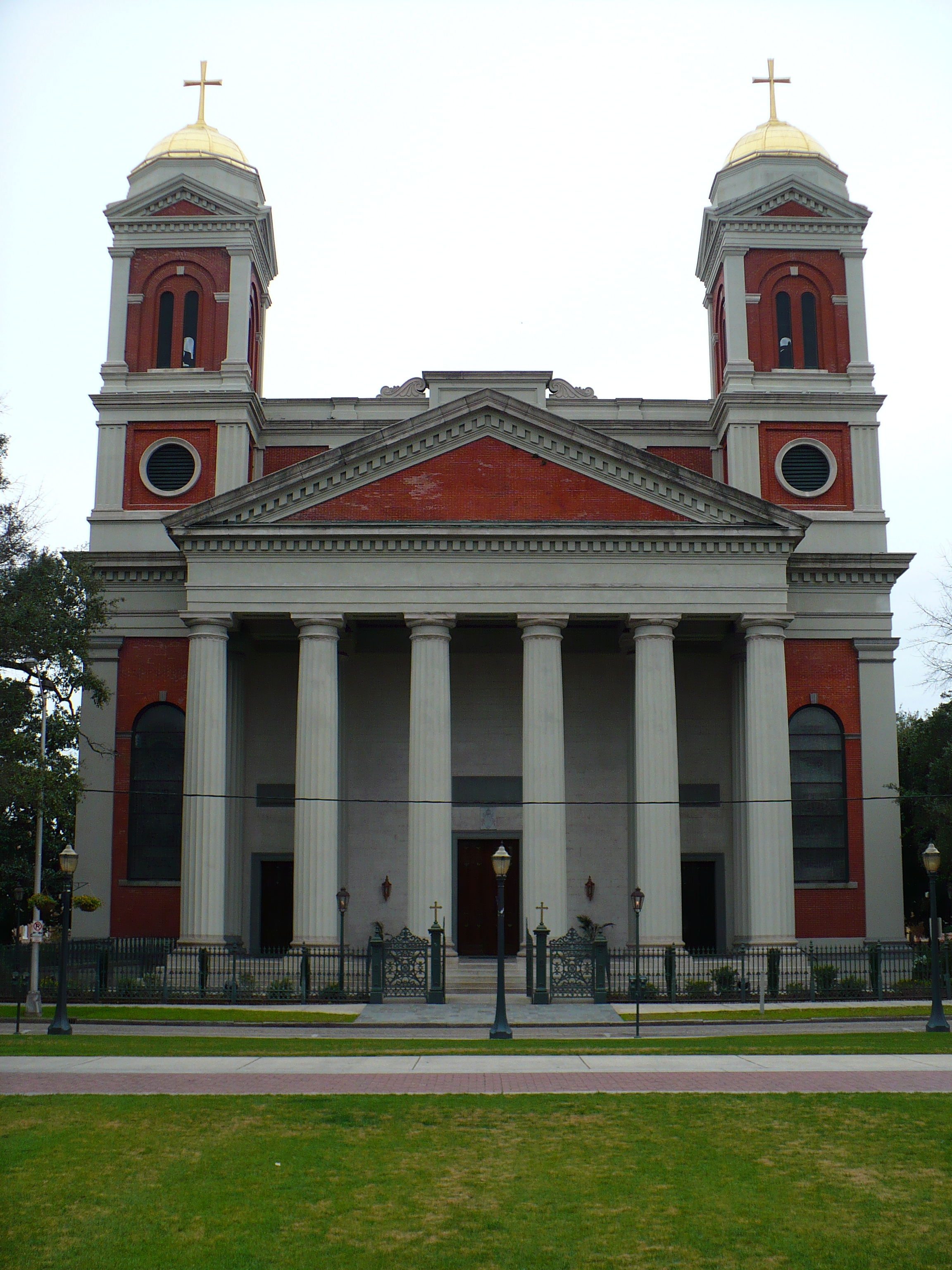
Oscar Hugh Lipscomb (935) was bishop of Mobile when it was elevated to an archdiocese in 1980 (cathedral pictured).

No.	Bishop	Consecrators	Year	Diocese
901	Eusebius J. Beltran	676 720 822	1978	II Tulsa, VII Oklahoma City
902	James Robert Hoffman	603 729 837	1978	Toledo (auxiliary, VI Toledo
903	Peter A. Rosazza	670 585 FM1	1978	Hartford (auxiliary)
904	Francis Quinn	748 478 703	1978	San Francisco (auxiliary), VII Sacramento
905	Pierre DuMaine	748 478 703	1978	San Francisco (auxiliary), I San Jose
906	Thomas Joseph Murphy	777 673 759	1978	V Great Falls-Billings, VII Seattle
907	Phillip Francis Straling	518 677 748	1978	I San Bernardino, VI Reno
908	Lawrence Welsh	688 610 782	1978	IV Spokane, Saint Paul and Minneapolis (auxiliary)
909	Robert F. Morneau	664 555 793	1979	Green Bay (auxiliary)
910	John E. McCarthy	613 693 792	1979	Galveston-Houston (auxiliary), III Austin
911	Agustin Roman	713 764 817	1979	Miami (auxiliary)
912	John Joseph Nevins	713 764 817	1979	Miami (auxiliary), I Venice
913	Stanley Girard Schlarman	765 539 859	1979	Belleville (auxiliary), IV Dodge City
914	Michael Hughes Kenny	PP264 FN1 FO1	1979	III Juneau
915	William Russell Houck	PP264 FN1 FO1	1979	Jackson (auxiliary), IX Jackson
916	William Thomas Larkin	PP264 FN1 FO1	1979	II Saint Petersburg
917	John Joseph O'Connor*	PP264 FN1 FO1	1979	Military Vicar of the United States (auxiliary), VII Scranton, XI New York
918	Matthew H. Clark	PP264 FN1 FO1	1979	VIII Rochester
919	Anthony Pilla	741 597 865	1979	Cleveland (auxiliary), IX Cleveland
920	James Anthony Griffin	741 597 865	1979	Cleveland (auxiliary), X Columbus
921	James Patterson Lyke	741 597 865	1979	Cleveland (auxiliary), V Atlanta
922	William Henry Keeler*	696 766 789	1979	Harrisburg (auxiliary), VII Harrisburg, XIV Baltimore
923	Joseph Fiorenza	792 613 910	1979	IV San Angelo, VII Galveston-Houston
924	William Benedict Friend	619 747 776	1979	Alexandria-Shreveport (auxiliary), I Shreveport
925	Myroslav Ivan Lubachivsky*	PP264 CV2 DZ2	1979	V Philadelphia of the Ukrainians
926	Richard J. Sklba	893 552 839	1979	Milwaukee (auxiliary)
927	Raphael Michael Fliss	660 552 893	1979	VIII Superior
928	José de Jesús Madera Uribe	535 803 852	1980	III Fresno, Military Vicar of the United States (auxiliary)
929	Jude Speyrer	744 569 723	1980	I Lake Charles
930	Leroy Matthiesen	792 613 674	1980	VI Amarillo
931	William Henry Bullock	813 814 878	1980	Saint Paul and Minneapolis (auxiliary), VII Des Moines, III Madison
932	Leo Edward O'Neil	820 FP1 763	1980	Springfield in Massachusetts (auxiliary), VIII Manchester
933	Benedict Charles Franzetta	657 729 842	1980	Youngstown (auxiliary)
934	Arthur Nicholas Tafoya	630 650 839	1980	III Pueblo
935	Oscar Hugh Lipscomb	747 833 924	1980	VIII Mobile
936	William Weigand	748 570 682	1980	VII Salt Lake City, VIII Sacramento
937	Anthony Bevilacqua*	768 646 827	1980	Brooklyn (auxiliary), X Pittsburgh, XI Philadelphia
938	Joseph Michael Sullivan	768 646 827	1980	Brooklyn (auxiliary)
939	René Arnold Valero	768 646 827	1980	Brooklyn (auxiliary)
940	Kenneth Edward Untener	544 679 757	1980	IV Saginaw
941	John George Chedid	EQ2 686 BB3	1981	I Los Angeles of the Maronites
942	Stephen Sulyk	CV2 807 EA1	1981	VI Philadelphia of the Ukrainians
943	Innocent Lotocky	CV2 807 EA1	1981	II Chicago of the Ukrainians
944	Joseph Keith Symons	916 523 713	1981	Saint Petersburg (auxiliary), II Pensacola-Tallahassee, II Palm Beach
945	Louis A. DeSimone	587 697 789	1981	Philadelphia (auxiliary)
946	Francis B. Schulte	587 697 789	1981	Philadelphia (auxiliary), VI Wheeling-Charleston, XVI New Orleans
947	Charles Victor Grahmann	792 467 613	1981	San Antonio (auxiliary), I Victoria, VI Dallas
948	Joseph Patrick Delaney	792 758 764	1981	II Fort Worth
949	Alfred Clifton Hughes	733 848 849	1981	Boston (auxiliary), IV Baton Rouge, XVII New Orleans
950	Daniel F. Walsh	748 894 914	1981	San Francisco (auxiliary), V Reno, I Las Vegas, V Santa Rosa

=== 951–1000 ===
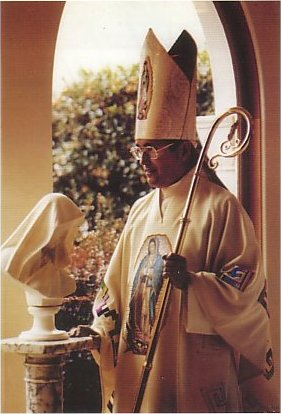
Alphonse Gallegos (953) was an auxiliary bishop of Sacramento who was declared Venerable in 2016.

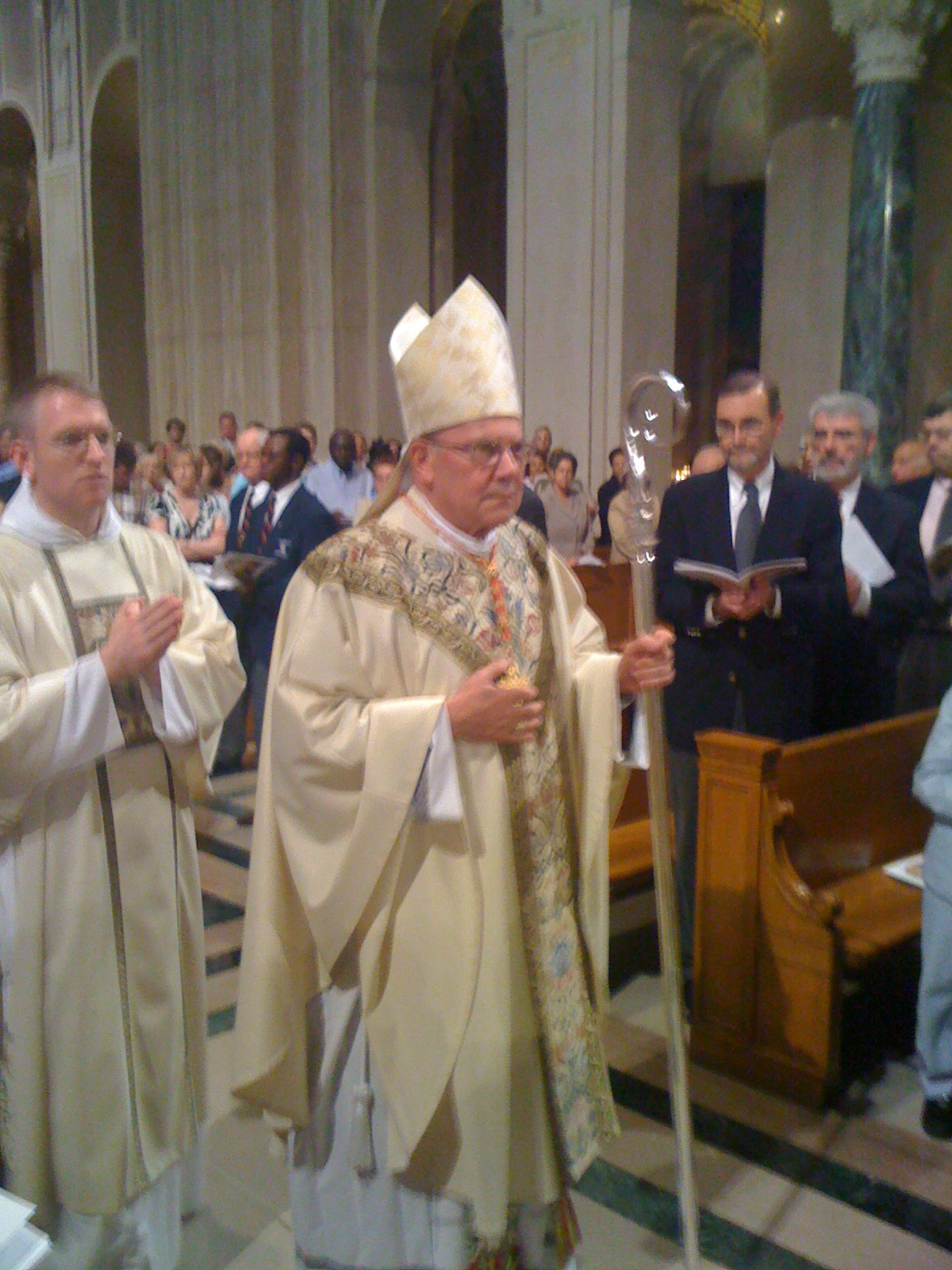
William Cardinal Levada (973) served as archbishop of San Francisco before moving to Rome to be Prefect of the Congregation for the Doctrine of the Faith

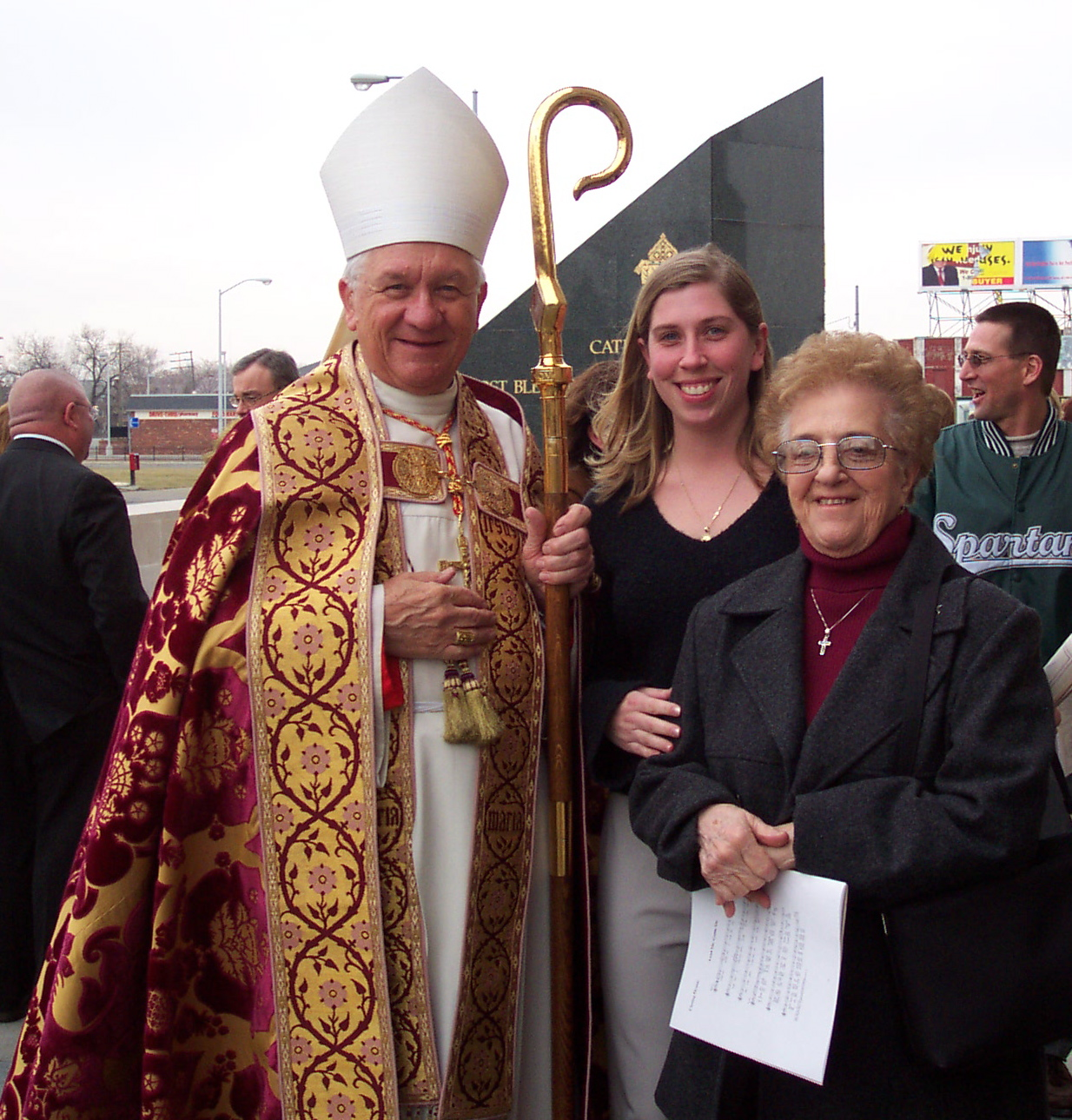
Adam Cardinal Maida (990) is the archbishop emeritus of Detroit.

No.	Bishop	Consecrators	Year	Diocese
951	Daniel L. Ryan	829 755 890	1981	Joliet (auxiliary), VII Springfield in Illinois
952	Robert Mikhail Moskal	942 807 943	1981	I Parma of the Ukrainians
953	Alphonse Gallegos^{#}	904 748 839	1981	Sacramento (auxiliary)
954	Mikail Nersès Sétian	FQ1 FR1 FS1	1981	I New York of the Armenians of the US and Canada
955	Robert John Rose	810 721 769	1981	II Gaylord, IX Grand Rapids
956	Ricardo Ramírez	792 613 FT1	1981	San Antonio (auxiliary), I Las Cruces
957	Thomas J. O'Brien	PP264 FO1 FU1	1982	III Phoenix
958	Anthony Michael Milone	PP264 FO1 FU1	1982	Omaha (auxiliary), VI Great Falls-Billings
959	Ibrahim Namo Ibrahim	FV1 FW1 FX1 FY1; FZ1 GA1 GB1	1982	I Detroit of the Chaldeans
960	Anthony Edward Pevec	919 729 765	1982	Cleveland (auxiliary)
961	Joseph Thomas O'Keefe	720 649 723	1982	New York (auxiliary), VIII Syracuse
962	Emerson John Moore	720 649 723	1982	New York (auxiliary)
963	Edward Kmiec	749 559 654	1982	Trenton (auxiliary), X Nashville, XIII Buffalo
964	John Jeremiah McRaith	892 668 814	1982	III Owensboro
965	Moses Anderson	810 723 830	1983	Detroit (auxiliary)
966	Patrick R. Cooney	810 723 830	1983	Detroit (auxiliary), III Gaylord
967	Dale Joseph Melczek	810 723 830	1983	Detroit (auxiliary), III Gary
968	David Arias Pérez	732 953 961	1983	Newark (auxiliary)
969	Joseph Thomas Dimino	720 726 818	1983	Military Vicar of the United States (auxiliary), VI Military Vicar of the United States
970	Francis Xavier Roque	720 726 818	1983	Military Vicar of the United States (auxiliary)
971	Lawrence Joyce Kenney	720 726 818	1983	Military Vicar of the United States (auxiliary)
972	Donald Montrose	518 695 803	1983	Los Angeles (auxiliary), IV Stockton
973	William Levada*	518 695 803	1983	Los Angeles (auxiliary), VIII Portland in Oregon, VII San Francisco
974	Robert Brom	813 718 771	1983	VI Duluth, IV San Diego
975	Michael Jarboe Sheehan	792 725 930	1983	I Lubbock, XI Santa Fe
976	Vasile Louis Puscas	GC1 772 778	1983	I Canton of the Romanians
977	Bernard Ferdinand Popp	792 613 681	1983	San Antonio (auxiliary)
978	Laszlo Anthony Iranyi	GD1° 728 946	1983	Vicar for the Hungarian diaspora
979	John Richard Keating	GD1° 790 906	1983	II Arlington
980	Lawrence Donald Soens	528 669 712	1983	V Sioux City
981	Andrew Pataki	622 772 834	1983	II Parma of the Byzantines, III Passaic of the Byzantines
982	Vladimir Ladislas Tarasevitch	943 778 890	1983	Vicar for the Belarusian diaspora
983	Angelo Thomas Acerra	726 969 970	1983	Military Vicar of the United States (auxiliary)
984	Alexander James Quinn	919 846 863	1983	Cleveland (auxiliary)
985	Timothy Joseph Lyne	729 716 759	1983	Chicago (auxiliary)
986	John George Vlazny	729 716 759	1983	Chicago (auxiliary), VI Winona, X Portland in Oregon
987	Plácido Rodriguez	729 716 759	1983	Chicago (auxiliary), II Lubbock
988	Wilton Daniel Gregory*	729 716 759	1983	Chicago (auxiliary), VII Belleville, VII Atlanta, VII Washington
989	Robert James Carlson	813 878 879	1984	Saint Paul and Minneapolis (auxiliary), VII Sioux Falls, V Saginaw, X St. Louis
990	Adam Maida*	GD1° 664 702	1984	IX Green Bay, VIII Detroit
991	Edward Joseph O'Donnell	747 671 802	1984	St. Louis (auxiliary), V Lafayette in Louisiana
992	J. Terry Steib	747 671 802	1984	St. Louis (auxiliary), IV Memphis
993	Michael Joseph Kaniecki	752 786 914	1984	III Fairbanks
994	Robert William Donnelly	902 603 846	1984	Toledo (auxiliary)
995	William Leo Higi	821 717 812	1984	V Lafayette in Indiana
996	James Kendrick Williams	842 615 892	1984	Convington (auxiliary), I Lexington
997	William Clifford Newman	761 680 841	1984	Baltimore (auxiliary)
998	John Ricard	761 680 841	1984	Baltimore (auxiliary), IV Pensacola-Tallahassee
999	John Thomas Steinbock	518 804 880	1984	Orange (auxiliary), IV Fresno
1000	James Henry Garland	846 607 713	1984	Cincinnati (auxiliary), XI Marquette

=== 1001–1050 ===
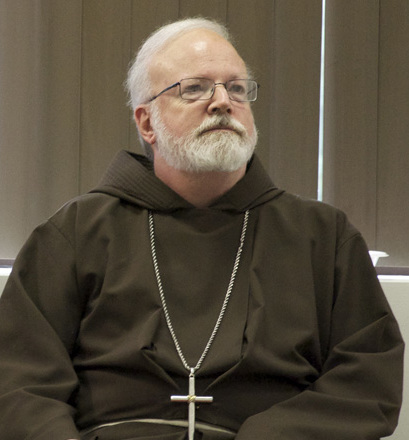
Seán Cardinal O'Malley (1001) was the archbishop of Boston.

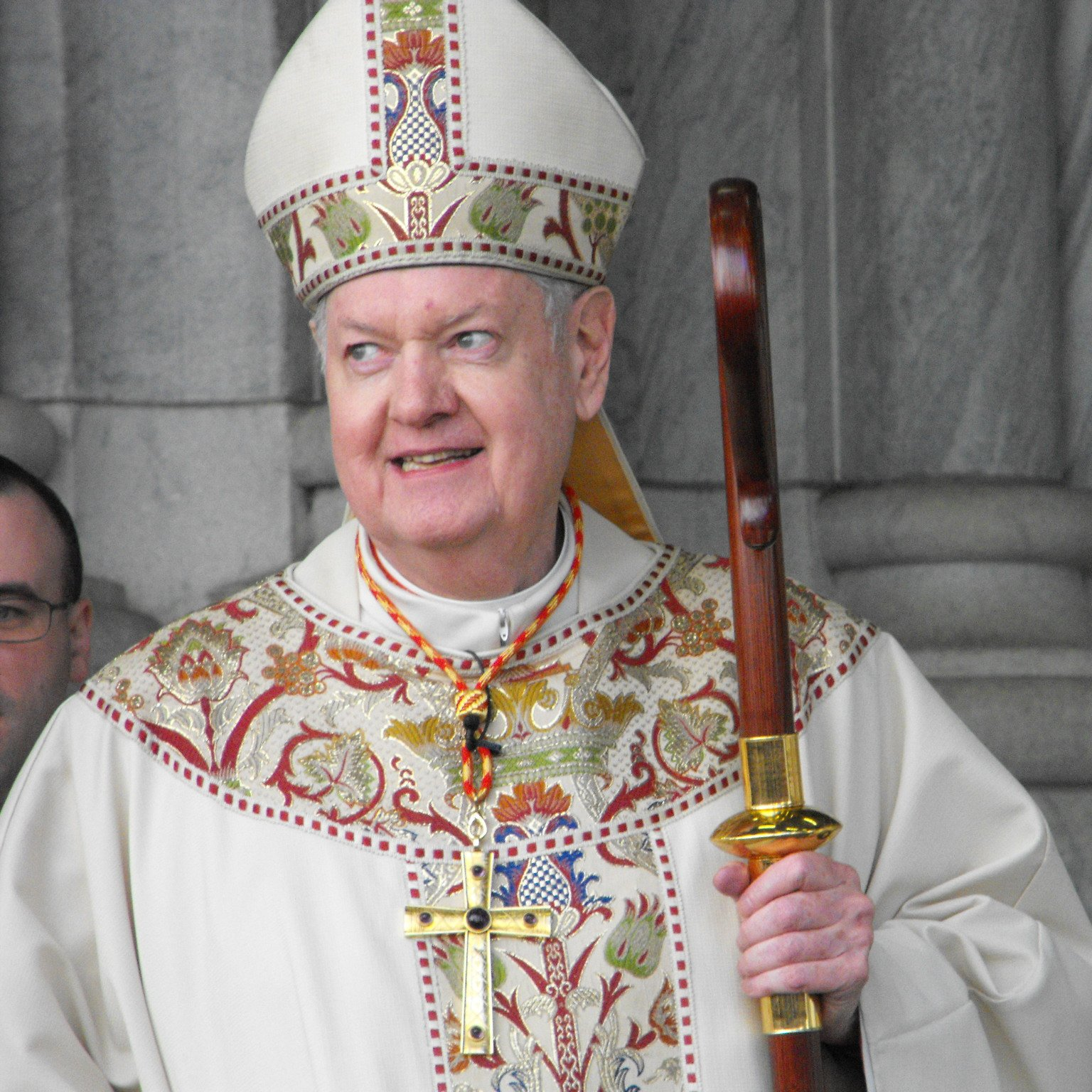
Edward Cardinal Egan (1007) was archbishop of New York until he retired in 2009.

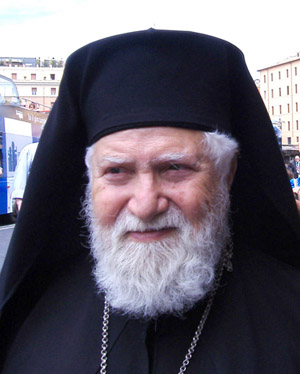
From 1993 to 2004, John Elya (1018) was the senior Melkite Greek clergyman in the United States.

No.	Bishop	Consecrators	Year	Diocese
1001	Seán Patrick O'Malley*	661 741 841	1984	II Saint Thomas, VI Fall River, IV Palm Beach, IX Boston
1002	Paulius Antanas Baltakis	GD1° 801 GE1	1984	Vicar for the Lithuanian diaspora
1003	James Patrick Keleher	729 765 906	1984	VI Belleville, IX Kansas City in Kansas
1004	John Joseph Leibrecht	747 631 835	1984	V Springfield-Cape Girardeau
1005	John Francis Donoghue	815 741 840	1984	II Charlotte, VI Atlanta
1006	Donald Walter Trautman	788 705 773	1985	Buffalo (auxiliary), IX Erie
1007	Edward Egan*	GF1 917 979	1985	VII New York (auxiliary), III Bridgeport, XII New York
1008	Roger Kaffer	829 755 951	1985	Joliet (auxiliary)
1009	Michael David Pfeifer	792 764 923	1985	V San Angelo
1010	Álvaro Corrada del Río (Note: Also #64 in the Puerto Rican historical succession of bishops.)	741 840 841	1985	Washington (auxiliary), III Tyler, II Mayaguez
1010a (Note: These bishops were not numbered in Bransom's original chronology because they did not serve in a United States diocese until after the book's publication in 1990.)	Justin Francis Rigali*	PP264 FO1 GG1	1985	VIII St. Louis, XII Philadelphia
1011	Robert Joseph Banks	835 767 816	1985	Boston (auxiliary), X Green Bay
1012	Donald Wuerl*	PP264 AL3 GF1	1986	Seattle (auxiliary), XI Pittsburgh, VI Washington
1013	Norbert Dorsey	713 820 GH1	1986	Miami (auxiliary), III Orlando
1014	Joseph John Gerry	847 653 883	1986	Manchester (auxiliary), X Portland in Maine
1015	Donald Edmond Pelotte	839 694 919	1986	III Gallup
1016	Harry Joseph Flynn	882 619 744	1986	IV Lafayette in Louisiana, IX Saint Paul and Minneapolis
1017	David Edward Foley	798 741 1005	1986	Richmond (auxiliary), III Birmingham
1018	John Elya	EV1 652 GI1	1986	IV Newton of the Melkites
1019	Enrique San Pedro	923 713 911	1986	Galveston-Houston (auxiliary), IV Brownsville
1020	John Favalora	GD1° 619 924	1986	IX Alexandria, III Saint Petersburg, III Miami
1021	Alfred John Markiewicz	800 885 939	1986	Rockville Centre (auxiliary), II Kalamazoo
1022	William Jerome McCormack	PP264 FO1 DR2	1987	New York (auxiliary)
1023	George Kuzma	622 772 875	1987	II Phoenix of the Byzantines
1024	George Patrick Ziemann	852 695 803	1987	Los Angeles (auxiliary), IV Santa Rosa
1025	Armando Xavier Ochoa	852 695 803	1987	Los Angeles (auxiliary), V El Paso, V Fresno
1026	Carl Anthony Fisher	852 695 803	1987	Los Angeles (auxiliary)
1027	Charles Edwin Herzig	792 725 975	1987	I Tyler
1028	George Edward Rueger	763 592 816	1987	Worcester (auxiliary)
1029	Daniel M. Buechlein	892 821 860	1987	III Memphis, XI Indianapolis
1030	William Edwin Franklin	890 528 780	1987	Dubuque (auxiliary), VII Davenport
1031	Joseph Victor Adamec	DS2 654 679	1987	VII Altoona-Johnstown
1032	Jerome Hanus	813 692 824	1987	VIII Saint Cloud, XI Dubuque
1033	John J. Myers	809 892 1012	1987	VII Peoria, IX Newark
1034	John Gavin Nolan	PP264 FO1 GJ1	1988	Military Vicar of the United States (auxiliary)
1035	James T. McHugh	887 633 732	1988	V Camden, III Rockville Centre
1036	John Mortimer Smith	887 633 732	1988	Newark (auxiliary), III Pensacola-Tallahassee, IX Trenton
1037	Curtis J. Guillory	923 619 992	1988	Galveston-Houston (auxiliary), V Beaumont
1038	Francis X. DiLorenzo	873 521 937	1988	Scranton (auxiliary), IV Honolulu, XII Richmond
1039	Raymond James Boland	935 741 841	1988	II Birmingham, VII Kansas City-Saint Joseph
1040	Thaddeus Joseph Jakubowski	729 716 759	1988	Chicago (auxiliary)
1041	John R. Gorman	729 716 759	1988	Chicago (auxiliary)
1042	Paul Loverde	670 679 856	1988	Hartford (auxiliary), XI Ogdensburg, III Arlington
1043	Michael Kuchmiak	942 DZ2 943	1988	Philadelphia of the Ukrainians (auxiliary)
1044	Charles J. Chaput	GD1° 813 860	1988	VI Rapid City, VII Denver, XIII Philadelphia
1045	Bernard William Schmitt	946 761 1012	1988	Wheeling-Charleston (auxiliary), VII Wheeling-Charleston
1046	Anthony O'Connell	GD1° 779 853	1988	I Knoxville, III Palm Beach
1047	Roberto González Nieves (Note: Also #65 in the Puerto Rican historical succession of bishops.)	835 917 PR50	1988	Boston (auxiliary), VI Corpus Christi, LI San Juan de Puerto Rico
1047a (Note: These bishops were not originally including in the numbering because they did not serve in a United States diocese at the time.)	Cyril Salim Bustros	EQ3 ES2 EV2	1988	XV Baalbek of the Melkites, V Newton of the Melkites
1048	Emil Aloysius Wcela	800 885 1021	1988	Rockville Centre (auxiliary)
1049	John Charles Dunne	800 885 1021	1988	Rockville Centre (auxiliary)
1050	Edmond Carmody	792 947 1027	1988	San Antonio (auxiliary), II Tyler, VII Corpus Christi

=== 1051–1100 ===
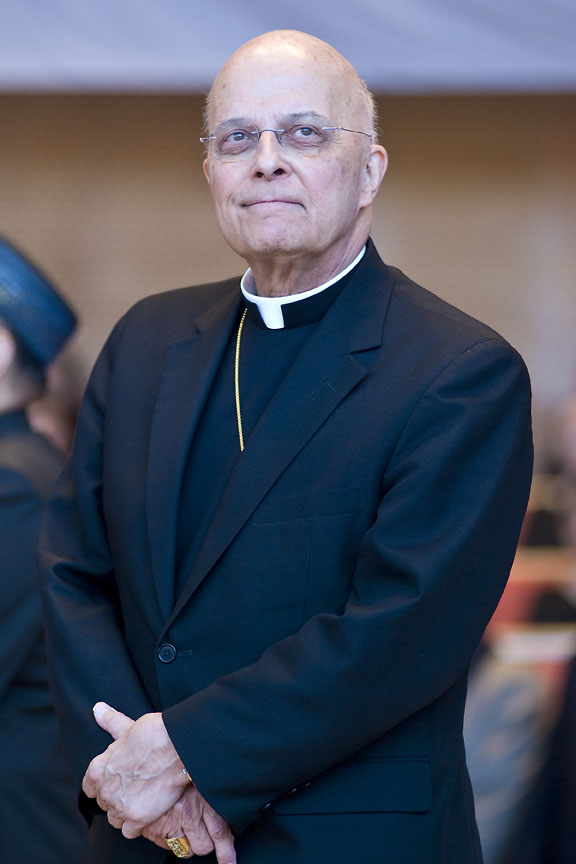
Francis Cardinal George (1075) was the archbishop of Chicago.

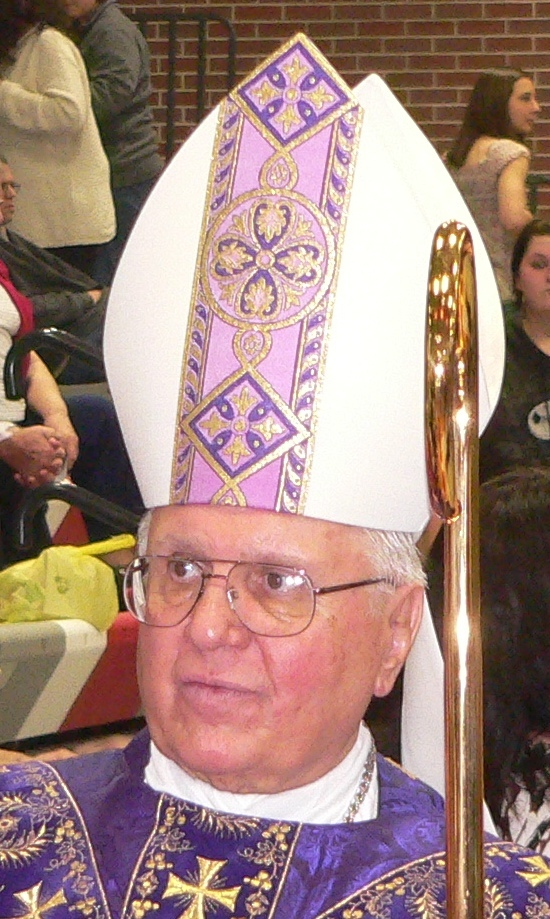
Fabian Bruskewitz (1082) is the bishop emeritus of Lincoln.

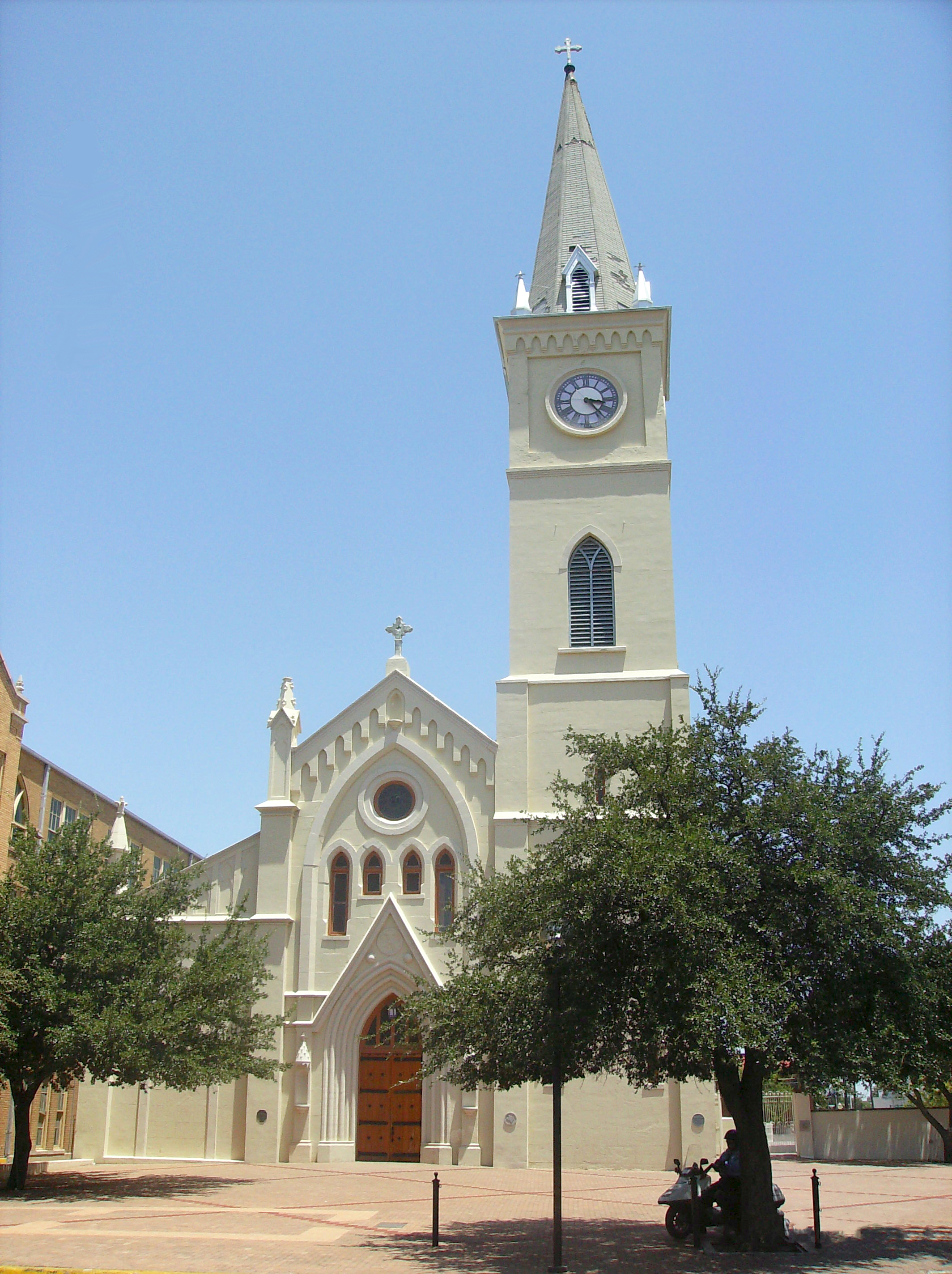
James Anthony Tamayo (1090) became the first (and so far only) bishop of Laredo in 2002 (cathedral pictured.)

No.	Bishop	Consecrators	Year	Diocese
1051	Leonard Olivier	741 841 1010	1988	Washington (auxiliary)
1052	William G. Curlin	741 841 1010	1988	Washington (auxiliary), III Charlotte
1053	Carlos Arthur Sevilla	748 750 993	1989	San Francisco (auxiliary), VI Yakima
1054	Patrick Joseph McGrath	748 750 993	1989	San Francisco (auxiliary), II San Jose
1055	William J. Winter	1012 735 794	1989	Pittsburgh (auxiliary)
1056	Tod Brown	973 682 881	1989	VI Boise, III Orange
1057	Gerald Andrew Gettelfinger	821 957 1029	1989	IV Evansville
1058	David B. Thompson	GD1° 841 854	1989	XI Charleston
1059	Paul Albert Zipfel	747 991 992	1989	St. Louis (auxiliary), VI Bismarck
1060	Nicholas Samra	652 GI1 GK1	1989	VI Newton of the Melkites
1061	Sam Jacobs	946 683 929	1989	X Alexandria, III Houma-Thibodaux
1062	Robert John Rose	810 721 769	1989	II Gaylord, IX Grand Rapids
1063	Joseph Charron	813 879 892	1990	Saint Paul and Minneapolis (auxiliary), VIII Des Moines
1064	Nicholas C. Dattilo	937 922 1012	1990	VIII Harrisburg
1065	Edward M. Grosz	788 773 1006	1990	Buffalo (auxiliary)
1066	Roger Lawrence Schwietz	813 974 1009	1990	VII Duluth, III Anchorage
1067	Ignatius Ghattas	EV1 652 GL1	1990	III Newton of the Melkites
1068	Michael Patrick Driscoll	795 808 999	1990	Orange (auxiliary), VII Boise
1069	David Eugene Fellhauer	792 725 947	1990	II Victoria
1070	Thomas Ludger Dupré	820 763 932	1990	VII Springfield in Massachusetts
1071	Stephen Blaire	852 695 1024	1990	Los Angeles (auxiliary), V Stockton
1072	Sylvester Donovan Ryan	852 695 1024	1990	Los Angeles (auxiliary), XIII Monterey
1073	Robert William Muench	946 619 1020	1990	New Orleans (auxiliary), IX Covington, V Baton Rouge
1074	Michael Angelo Saltarelli	887 732 1036	1990	VIII Wilmington
1075	Francis George*	GM1° 886 1066	1990	V Yakima, IX Portland in Oregon, XII Chicago
1076	Patrick Sheridan	917 787 832	1990	New York (auxiliary)
1077	John Richard Sheets	849 812 821	1991	Fort Wayne-South Bend (auxiliary)
1078	Raymond E. Goedert	729 759 1041	1991	Chicago (auxiliary)
1079	John Joseph Glynn	PP264 GJ1 GN1	1992	Military Vicar of the United States (auxiliary)
1080	Gerald Richard Barnes	907 792 1037	1992	San Bernardino (auxiliary), II San Bernardino
1081	Wolodymyr Paska	942 807 943	1992	Philadelphia of the Ukrainians (auxiliary)
1082	Fabian Bruskewitz	699 631 781	1992	VIII Lincoln
1083	John Patrick Boles	835 849 1079	1992	Boston (auxiliary)
1084	John R. McNamara	835 849 1079	1992	Boston (auxiliary)
1085	Joseph Anthony Galante	792 946 1038	1992	San Antonio (auxiliary), IV Beaumont, Dallas (coadjutor), VII Camden
1086	Thomas Joseph Tobin	1012 794 1064	1992	Pittsburgh (auxiliary), IV Youngstown, VIII Providence
1087	Henry J. Mansell	PP264 GJ1 1010a	1993	New York (auxiliary), XII Buffalo, XII Hartford
1088	Dominic Carmon	946 988 1016	1993	New Orleans (auxiliary)
1089	Charles Michael Jarrell	946 683 744	1993	II Houma-Thibodaux, VI Lafayette in Louisiana
1090	James Anthony Tamayo	923 817 1019	1993	Galveston-Houston (auxiliary), I Laredo
1091	Carl K. Moeddel	846 713 1000	1993	Cincinnati (auxiliary)
1092	Michael Wiwchar	942 DZ3 943	1993	III Chicago of the Ukrainians
1093	Elliot Griffin Thomas	741 1001 GO1	1993	III Saint Thomas
1094	Kevin Michael Britt	990 756 967	1994	X Grand Rapids
1095	Bernard Joseph Harrington	990 756 967	1994	Detroit (auxiliary), VII Winona
1096	Edward James Slattery	PP264 GJ1 GN1	1994	III Tulsa
1097	Thomas John Curry	852 695 1025	1994	Los Angeles (auxiliary)
1098	Joseph Martin Sartoris	852 695 1025	1994	Los Angeles (auxiliary)
1099	Gabino Zavala	852 695 1025	1994	Los Angeles (auxiliary)
1100	Edward Peter Cullen	937 GP1 946	1994	Philadelphia (auxiliary), III Allentown

=== 1101–1150 ===
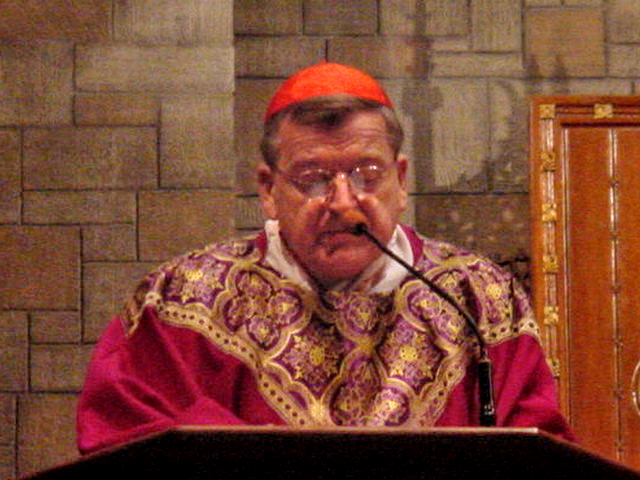
Raymond Cardinal Burke (1107) was archbishop of St. Louis and then served as prefect for the Apostolic Signatura in Rome. He is now the Cardinal Patron of the Knights of Malta, while they undergo a reform process started by Pope Francis, though because of a dispute within the order that eventually involved the Pope, his duties have been limited.

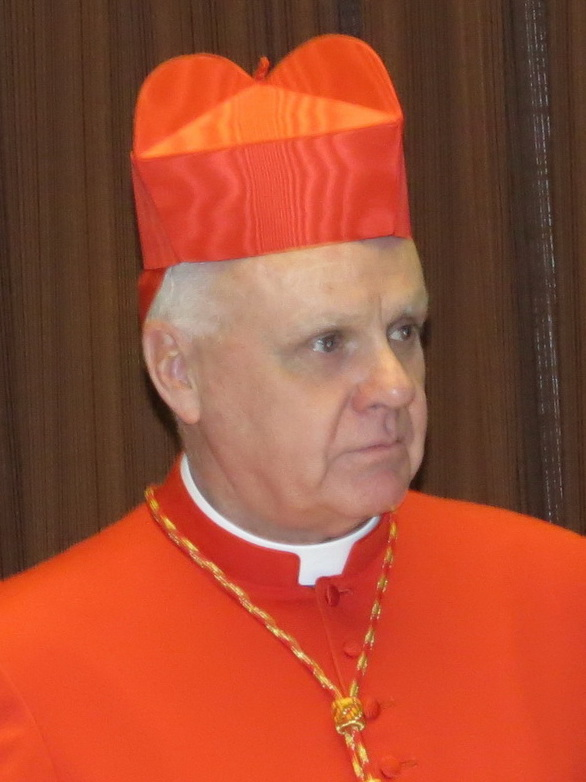
Edwin Cardinal O'Brien (1129) was archbishop of Baltimore and served as Grand Master of the Equestrian Order of the Holy Sepulchre of Jerusalem from 2012 until 2019.

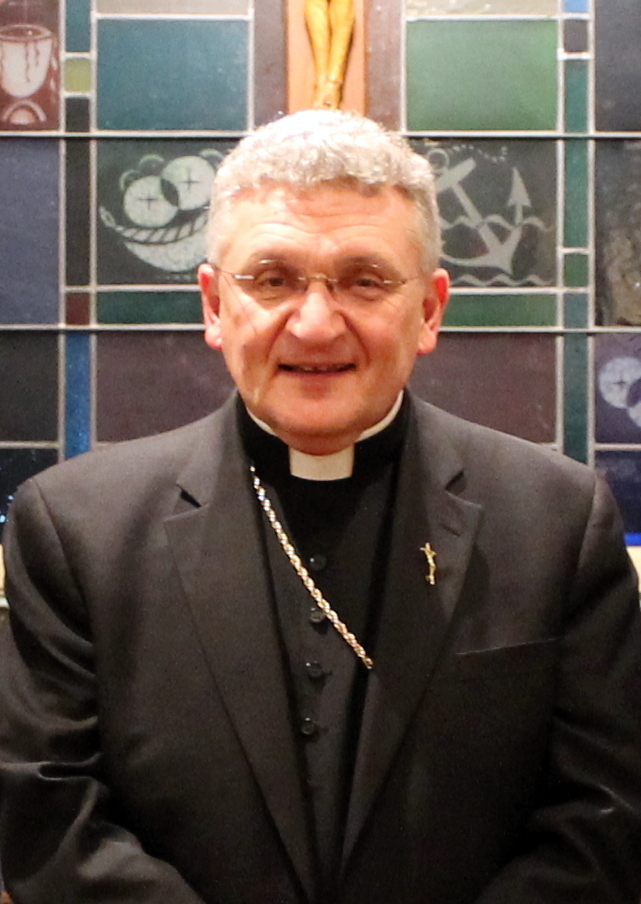
David Zubik (1142) is the bishop emeritus of Pittsburgh.

No.	Bishop	Consecrators	Year	Diocese
1101	Charles James McDonnell	887 732 1074	1994	Newark (auxiliary)
1102	Thomas G. Doran	729 770 1084	1994	VIII Rockford
1103	Alexander Joseph Brunett	973 861 990	1994	VIII Helena, VIII Seattle
1104	Gerald Barbarito	848 938 939	1994	Brooklyn (auxiliary), XII Ogdensburg, V Palm Beach
1105	Ignatius Anthony Catanello	848 938 939	1994	Brooklyn (auxiliary)
1106	John Yanta	792 947 GQ1	1994	San Antonio (auxiliary), VII Amarillo
1107	Raymond Leo Burke*	PP264 GJ1 GR1	1995	VIII La Crosse, IX St. Louis
1108	George Hugh Niederauer	852 973 1056	1995	VIII Salt Lake City, VIII San Francisco
1109	Judson Procyk	772 981 1023	1995	VI Pittsburgh of the Byzantines
1110	John M. Dougherty	873 521 1038	1995	Scranton (auxiliary)
1111	Manuel Batakian	FQ1 FS1 GS1	1995	III New York of the Armenians of the US and Canada
1112	Edwin Michael Conway	729 759 985	1995	Chicago (auxiliary)
1113	Gerald Frederick Kicanas	729 759 985	1995	Chicago (auxiliary), VI Tucson
1114	George Murry	729 759 985	1995	Chicago (auxiliary), IV Saint Thomas, V Youngstown
1115	J. Kevin Boland	1005 833 1039	1995	XIII Savannah
1116	William E. Lori^{‡}	741 791 1052	1995	Washington (auxiliary), IV Bridgeport, **XVI Baltimore**
1117	Hovhannes Tertsakian	FQ1 GS1 954	1995	II New York of the Armenians of the US and Canada
1118	Edward Braxton	1010a 992 1059	1995	St. Louis (auxiliary), II Lake Charles, VIII Belleville
1119	James Michael Moynihan	917 918 961	1995	IX Syracuse
1120	Michael Richard Cote	1014 883 1107	1995	Portland in Maine (auxiliary), V Norwich
1121	John Brendan McCormack	835 791 949	1995	Boston (auxiliary), IX Manchester
1122	William Murphy	835 791 949	1995	Boston (auxiliary), IV Rockville Centre
1123	Ignatius Joseph Yonan	GT1 GU1 GV1	1996	I Newark of the Syrians
1124	Carl Frederick Mengeling	990 796 967	1996	IV Lansing
1125	Robert Nugent Lynch	1020 713 GW1	1996	IV Saint Petersburg
1126	John R. Manz	729 987 988	1996	Chicago (auxiliary)
1127	Robert P. Maginnis	937 946 1100	1996	Philadelphia (auxiliary)
1128	Joseph Francis Martino	937 946 1100	1996	Philadelphia (auxiliary), IX Scranton
1129	Edwin Frederick O'Brien*	917 1034 1076	1996	New York (auxiliary), VII Military Vicar of the United States, XV Baltimore
1130	Francis Joseph Christian	932 847 1014	1996	Manchester (auxiliary)
1131	Stefan Soroka	DZ3 GX1 1081	1996	VII Philadelphia of the Ukrainians
1132	John Clayton Nienstedt	990 741 810	1996	Detroit (auxiliary), III New Ulm, X Saint Paul and Minneapolis
1133	Allen Henry Vigneron	990 741 810	1996	Detroit (auxiliary), III Oakland, IX Detroit
1134	Basil Schott	1109 981 1023	1996	III Parma of the Byzantines, VII Pittsburgh of the Byzantines
1135	John Michael Botean^{‡}	GY1 1060 1109	1996	**II Canton of the Romanians of the US and Canada**
1136	Emilio S. Allué	835 887 1011	1996	Boston (auxiliary)
1137	Francis Xavier Irwin	835 887 1011	1996	Boston (auxiliary)
1138	Nicholas Anthony DiMarzio	887 732 1036	1996	Newark (auxiliary), VI Camden, VII Brooklyn
1139	Michael William Warfel	786 886 993	1996	IV Juneau, VII Great Falls-Billings
1140	Gregory Michael Aymond	946 619 1020	1997	New Orleans (auxiliary), IV Austin, XVIII New Orleans
1141	Stephen Youssef Doueihi	EQ4 686 GZ1	1997	II Brooklyn of the Maronites
1142	David Zubik	1012 1064 1086	1997	Pittsburgh (auxiliary), XI Green Bay, XII Pittsburgh
1143	Christie Macaluso	767 903 1042	1997	Hartford (auxiliary)
1144	Robert Anthony Brucato	917 1076 1087	1997	New York (auxiliary)
1145	John R. Gaydos	1010a 779 935	1997	III Jefferson City
1146	Gilberto Fernandez	1020 713 911	1997	Miami (auxiliary)
1147	Thomas Wenski^{‡}	1020 713 911	1997	Miami (auxiliary), IV Orlando, **IV Miami**
1148	Paul Gregory Bootkoski	887 1036 1074	1997	Newark (auxiliary), IV Metuchen
1149	Joseph Fred Naumann	1010a 991 1118	1997	St. Louis (auxiliary), X Kansas City in Kansas
1150	Michael John Sheridan	1010a 991 1118	1997	St. Louis (auxiliary), II Colorado Springs

=== 1151–1200 ===
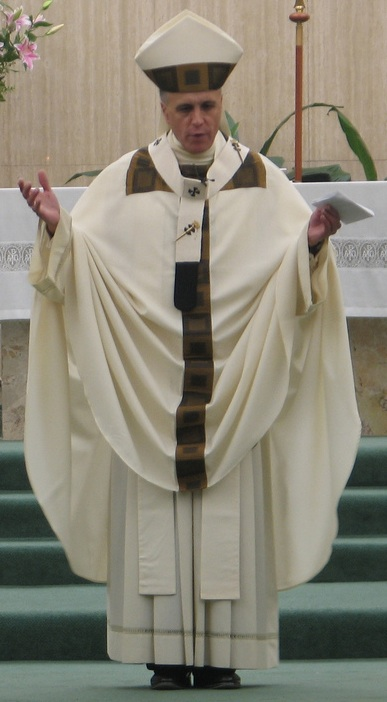
Daniel Cardinal DiNardo (1152) archbishop emeritus of Galveston-Houston.

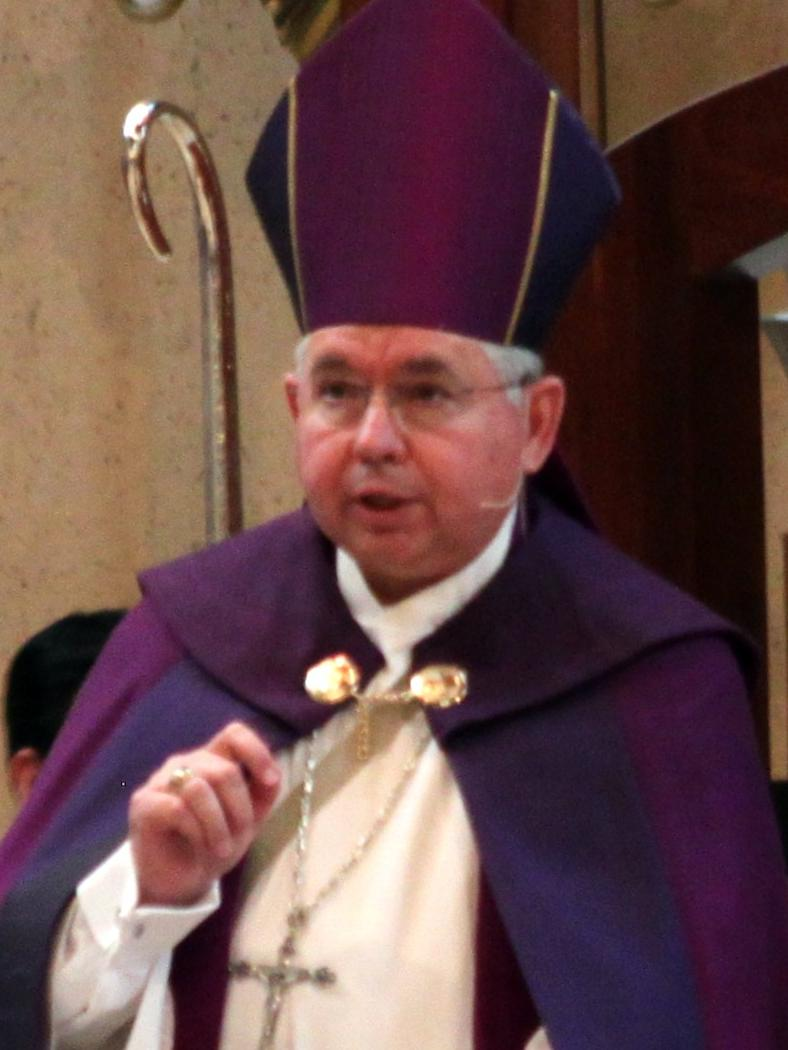
José Horacio Gómez (1186) is the current archbishop of Los Angeles.

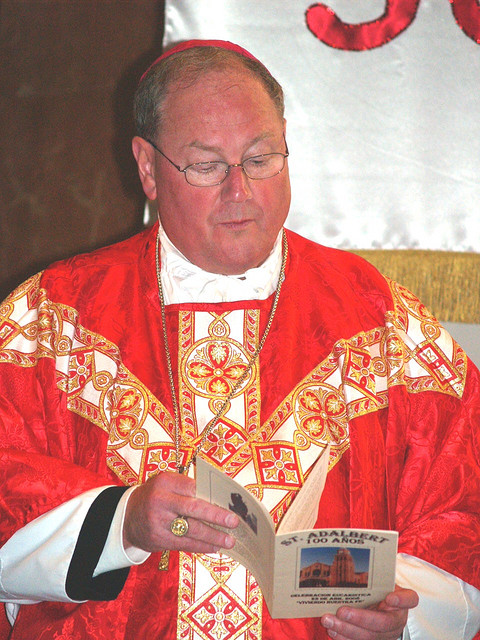
Timothy Cardinal Dolan (1196), archbishop emeritus of New York.

No.	Bishop	Consecrators	Year	Diocese
1151	Vincent DePaul Breen	887 848 869	1997	III Metuchen
1152	Daniel DiNardo*	980 1012 1107	1997	VI Sioux City, VIII Galveston-Houston
1153	Daniel R. Jenky	849 GM1° HA1	1997	Fort Wayne-South Bend (auxiliary), VIII Peoria
1154	Gerald Eugene Wilkerson	852 1068 1098	1998	Los Angeles (auxiliary)
1155	James Albert Murray	990 811 1124	1998	III Kalamazoo
1156	Richard John Garcia	936 748 905	1998	Sacramento (auxiliary), XIV Monterey
1157	Thomas Flanagan	792 910 1050	1998	San Antonio (auxiliary)
1158	Patrick Zurek	792 910 1050	1998	San Antonio (auxiliary), VIII Amarillo
1159	Gordon Dunlap Bennett	922 1114 1053	1998	Baltimore (auxiliary)
1160	Joseph Perry	1075 893 1114	1998	Chicago (auxiliary)
1161	Ronald Michael Gilmore	1003 877 913	1998	V Dodge City
1162	John Charles Wester^{‡}	973 748 1054	1998	San Francisco (auxiliary), IX Salt Lake City, **XII Santa Fe**
1163	Blase Joseph Cupich*^{‡}	1016 861 1044	1998	VII Rapid City, VI Spokane, **XIII Chicago**
1164	Robert Joseph McManus^{‡}	883 818 844	1999	Providence (auxiliary), **V Worcester**
1165	Thomas Olmsted	877 1003 1082	1999	VII Wichita, IV Phoenix
1166	Frederick F. Campbell	1016 813 1063	1999	Saint Paul and Minneapolis (auxiliary), XI Columbus
1167	James Francis McCarthy	917 791 1129	1999	New York (auxiliary)
1168	Leonard Paul Blair	990 810 967	1999	Detroit (auxiliary), VII Toledo, XIII Hartford
1169	Robert C. Morlino	HB1° 811 986	1999	IX Helena, IV Madison
1170	Robert Joseph Baker	1005 HB1° 827	1999	XII Charleston, IV Birmingham
1171	Joseph Edward Kurtz	HB1° 892 1100	1999	II Knoxville, X Louisville
1172	George Joseph Lucas	1075 HB1° 951	1999	VIII Springfield in Illinois, IX Omaha
1173	David Ricken^{‡}	PP264 GJ1 HC1	2000	VII Cheyenne, **XII Green Bay**
1174	Robert F. Vasa^{‡}	986 808 1082	2000	V Baker, **VI Santa Rosa**
1175	George Leo Thomas^{‡}	1103 886 1053	2000	Seattle (auxiliary), X Helena, **III Las Vegas**
1176	Richard Joseph Malone	835 1083 1122	2000	Boston (auxiliary), XI Portland in Maine, XIV Buffalo
1177	J. Peter Sartain	901 822 992	2000	VI Little Rock, IV Joliet, IX Seattle
1178	John Joseph Kaising	1129 846 1091	2000	Military Vicar of the United States (auxiliary)
1179	Jaime Soto^{‡}	1056 795 1068	2000	Orange (auxiliary), **IX Sacramento**
1180	Arthur J. Serratelli	887 1074 1148	2000	Newark (auxiliary), VII Paterson
1181	Jerome Edward Listecki	1075 986 1003	2001	Chicago (auxiliary), IX La Crosse, XI Milwaukee
1181a	John Stephen Pazak	DZ3 IE1 IF1	2001	II Toronto of the Slovaks, V Phoenix of the Byzantines
1182	Robert Joseph Shaheen	BB3 686 941 1141 HD1	2001	II Los Angeles of the Maronites
1183	William Francis Malooly	922 761 997	2001	Baltimore (auxiliary), IX Wilmington
1184	Timothy Broglio^{‡}	PP264 GJ1 HE1	2001	**VIII Military Vicar of the United States**
1185	Edward William Clark	852 973 1010a	2001	Los Angeles (auxiliary)
1186	José Horacio Gómez^{‡}	1044 923 HF1	2001	Denver (auxiliary), IX San Antonio, **XII Los Angeles**
1187	Richard Pates	1016 813 1165	2001	Saint Paul and Minneapolis (auxiliary), IX Des Moines
1188	Dennis Patrick O'Neil	1080 1071 1099	2001	San Bernardino (auxiliary)
1189	Dennis Marion Schnurr	1016 HB1° 980	2001	VIII Duluth, X Cincinnati
1190	Joseph A. Pepe	973 975 1085	2001	II Las Vegas
1191	Martin John Amos	919 960 984	2001	Cleveland (auxiliary), VIII Davenport
1192	Roger William Gries	919 960 984	2001	Cleveland (auxiliary)
1193	Jacob Angadiath	HG1 HH1 HI1	2001	I Chicago of the Syro-Malabarians
1194	Thomas John Rodi	935 826 946	2001	II Biloxi, IX Mobile
1195	Vincent M. Rizzotto	923 792 910	2001	Galveston-Houston (auxiliary)
1196	Timothy M. Dolan*	1010a 1149 1150	2001	St. Louis (auxiliary), X Milwaukee, XIII New York
1197	Victor Galeone	1020 827 1182	2001	IX St. Augustine
1198	Samuel J. Aquila	1016 825 1044	2001	VII Fargo, VIII Denver
1199	Walter James Edyvean	835 819 1122	2001	Boston (auxiliary)
1200	Richard Lennon	835 819 1122	2001	Boston (auxiliary), X Cleveland

=== 1201–1250 ===
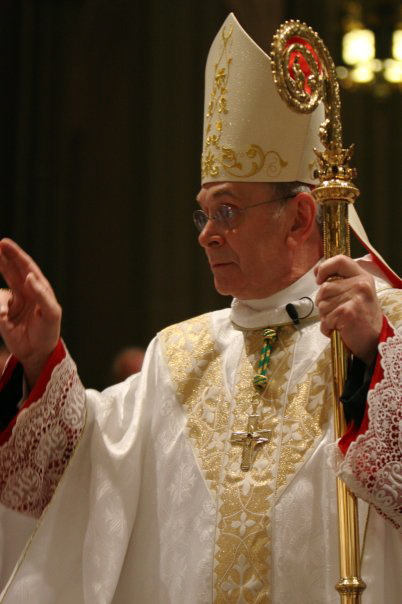
Roger Joseph Foys (1211) served as the 10th Bishop of Covington.

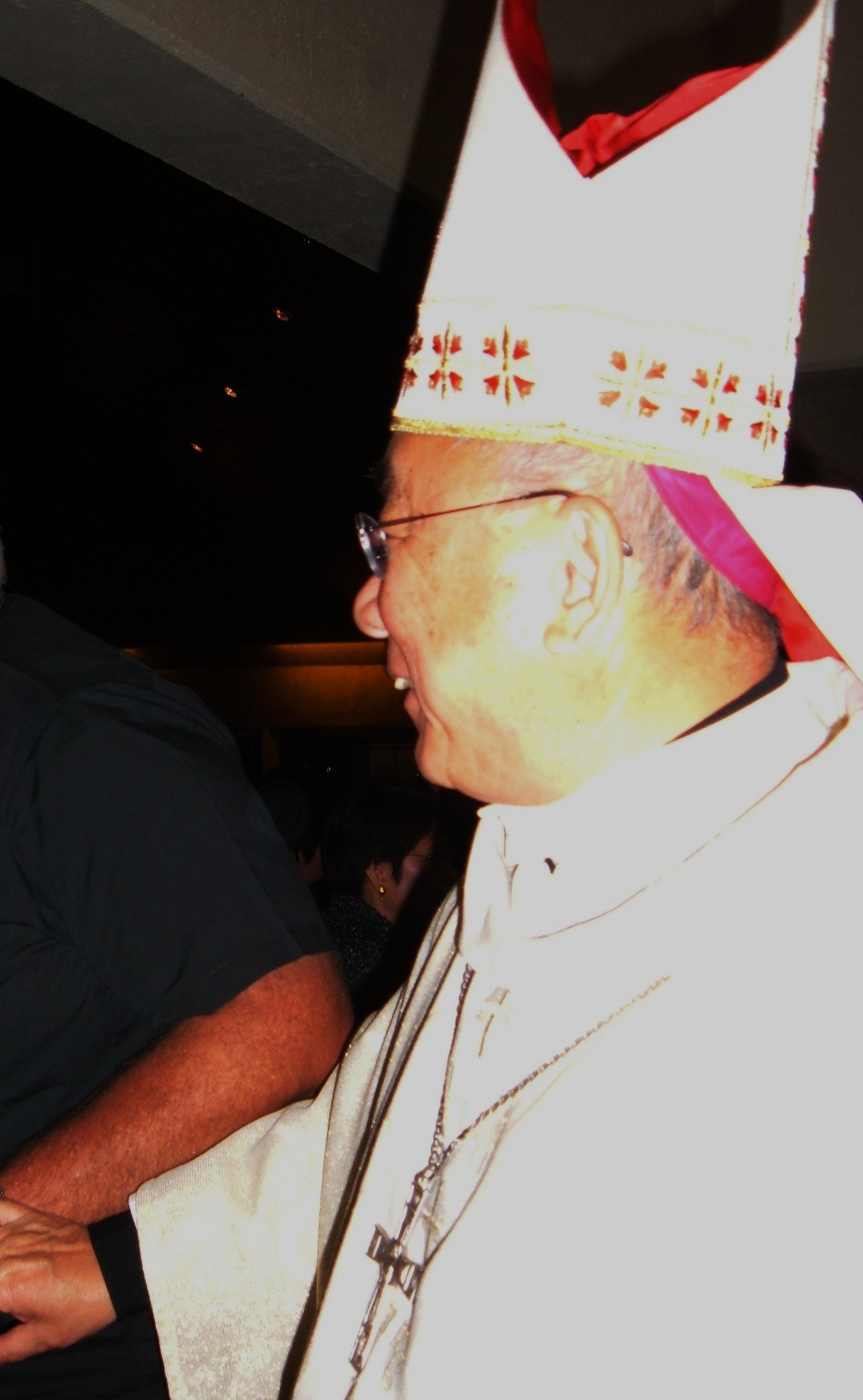
Bishop Ignatius C. Wang (1219) is the first bishop of Asian descent in the United States.

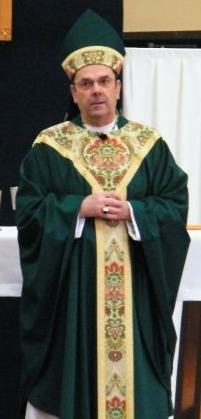
Robert Joseph Cunningham (1240) is the Bishop Emeritus of Syracuse.

No.	Bishop	Consecrators	Year	Diocese
1201	Josu Iriondo	1007 1087 1144	2001	New York (auxiliary)
1202	Dominick John Lagonegro	1007 1087 1144	2001	New York (auxiliary)
1203	Timothy A. McDonnell	1007 1087 1144	2001	New York (auxiliary), VIII Springfield in Massachusetts
1204	Joe S. Vásquez^{‡}	923 792 1009	2002	Galveston-Houston (auxiliary), V Austin, **IX Galveston-Houston**
1205	Kevin Farrell*	887 741 1051	2002	Washington (auxiliary), VII Dallas, **Prefect of the Dicastery for Laity, Family and Life**
1206	Francisco González Valer	887 741 1051	2002	Washington (auxiliary)
1207	James Edward Fitzgerald	829 951 1008	2002	Joliet (auxiliary)
1208	William C. Skurla^{‡}	981 1023 1134	2002	III Phoenix of the Byzantines, IV Passaic of the Byzantines, **VIII Pittsburgh of the Byzantines**
1209	Paul Patrick Chomnycky^{‡}	CV3 DZ3 EA2	2002	**IV Stamford of the Ukrainians**
1210	John Michael Kudrick	1134 981 1207	2002	IV Parma of the Byzantines
1211	Roger Joseph Foys	892 863 1073	2002	X Covington
1212	Mar Sarhad Yawsip Jammo	FV2 FW1 959	2002	I San Diego of the Chaldeans
1213	Robert Daniel Conlon	846 863 HJ1	2002	IV Steubenville, V Joliet
1214	Salvatore J. Cordileone^{‡}	974 838 1107	2002	San Diego (auxiliary), IV Oakland, **IX San Francisco**
1215	Donald Joseph Kettler	1066 989 1139	2002	IV Fairbanks, X Saint Cloud
1216	Michael Francis Burbidge^{‡}	937 1100 1127	2002	Philadelphia (auxiliary), V Raleigh, **IV Arlington**
1217	Earl Boyea^{‡}	990 1086 1184	2002	Detroit (auxiliary), **V Lansing**
1218	Robert Joseph Hermann	1010a 1149 1196	2002	St. Louis (auxiliary)
1219	Ignatius C. Wang	973 1054 1162	2003	San Francisco (auxiliary)
1220	Ronald William Gainer	892 1100 1171	2003	II Lexington, XI Harrisburg
1221	Joseph Nunzio Latino	935 915 1020	2003	X Jackson
1222	Gustavo García-Siller^{‡}	1075 1078 HK1	2003	Chicago (auxiliary), **X San Antonio**
1223	Francis J. Kane	1075 1078 HK1	2003	Chicago (auxiliary)
1224	Thomas J. Paprocki^{‡}	1075 1078 HK1	2003	Chicago (auxiliary), **IX Springfield in Illinois**
1225	Roger Morin	949 619 946	2003	New Orleans (auxiliary), III Biloxi
1226	Paul Henry Walsh	1122 1048 1049	2003	Rockville Centre (auxiliary)
1227	Richard Seminack	CV3 952 1131	2003	IV Chicago of the Ukrainians
1228	Dominic Mai Luong	1056 949 1179	2003	Orange (auxiliary)
1229	George William Coleman	HB1° 767 1001	2003	VII Fall River
1230	Walter A. Hurley	990 756 810	2003	Detroit (auxiliary), XI Grand Rapids
1231	John M. Quinn	990 756 810	2003	Detroit (auxiliary), VIII Winona-Rochester
1232	Francis R. Reiss	990 756 810	2003	Detroit (auxiliary)
1233	Edgar Moreira da Cunha^{‡}	1033 1138 1180	2003	Newark (auxiliary), **VIII Fall River**
1234	Peter Joseph Jugis	1005 766 1052	2003	IV Charlotte
1235	Felipe de Jesús Estévez	1020 CT2 1165	2004	Miami (auxiliary), X St. Augustine
1236	Oscar A. Solis^{‡}	852 1061 1089	2004	Los Angeles (auxiliary), **X Salt Lake City**
1237	Gregory John Mansour^{‡}	EQ4 HD1 1141	2004	**III Brooklyn of the Maronites**
1238	Lawrence Eugene Brandt	1010a 794 1006	2004	IV Greensburg
1239	Robert Finn	1107 1039 1149	2004	VIII Kansas City-Saint Joseph
1240	Robert Joseph Cunningham	1007 1087 1104	2004	XIII Ogdensburg, X Syracuse
1241	Martin Holley	887 998 1051	2004	Washington (auxiliary), V Memphis
1242	Joseph W. Estabrook	1129 882 936	2004	Military Vicar of the United States (auxiliary)
1243	Richard Higgins	1129 882 936	2004	Military Vicar of the United States (auxiliary)
1244	Joseph Robert Cistone	1010a 1127 1216	2004	Philadelphia (auxiliary), VI Saginaw
1245	Joseph P. McFadden	1010a 1127 1216	2004	Philadelphia (auxiliary), X Harrisburg
1246	Gaetano Aldo Donato	1033 1074 1180	2004	Newark (auxiliary)
1247	John Walter Flesey	1033 1074 1180	2004	Newark (auxiliary)
1248	Mitchell T. Rozanski^{‡}	922 997 1183	2004	Baltimore (auxiliary), IX Springfield in Massachusetts, **XI St. Louis**
1249	Dennis Joseph Sullivan	1007 1076 1144	2004	New York (auxiliary), VIII Camden
1250	Gerald Thomas Walsh	1007 1076 1144	2004	New York (auxiliary)

=== 1251–1300 ===
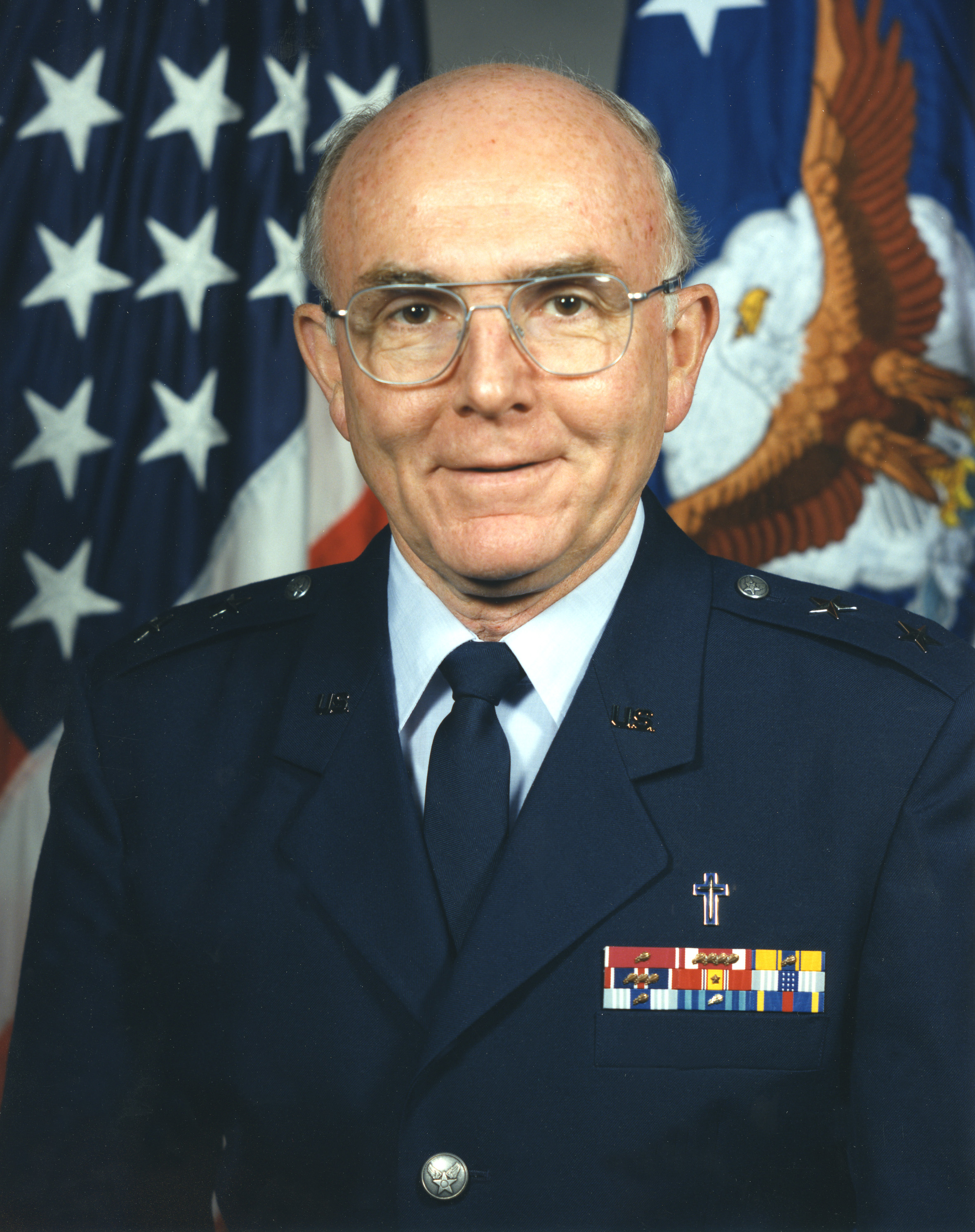
William Joseph Dendinger (1253), a former Air Force chaplain, was the bishop of Grand Island.

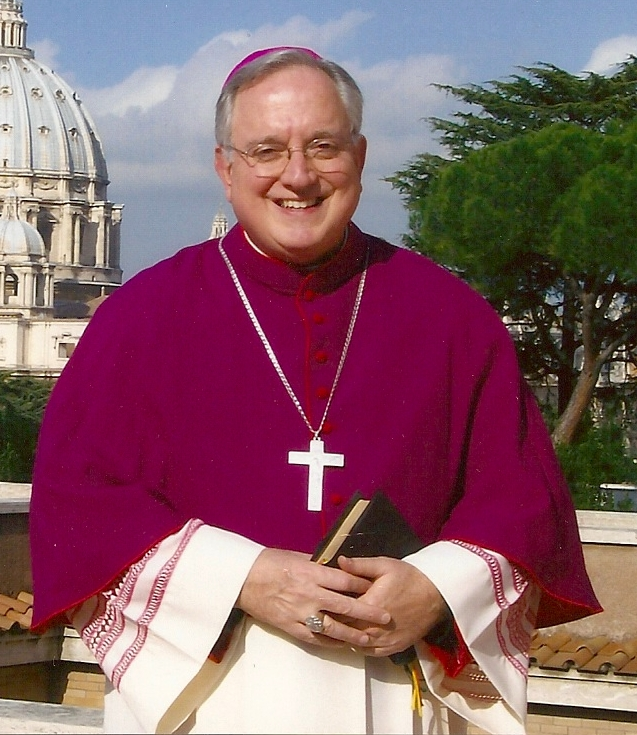
William P. Callahan (1287) is the tenth bishop of La Crosse.

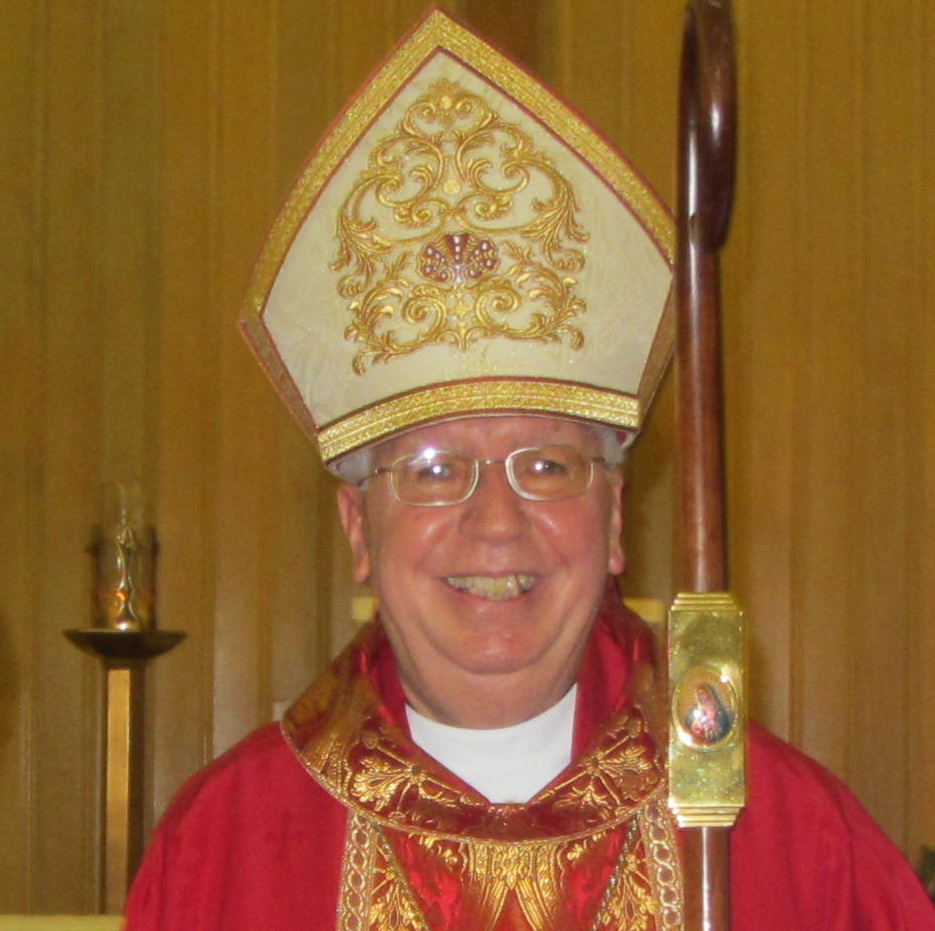
Cirilo Flores (1300) was the fifth bishop of San Diego.

No.	Bishop	Consecrators	Year	Diocese
1251	Alexander Salazar	852 1099 1222	2004	Los Angeles (auxiliary)
1252	Kevin C. Rhoades^{‡}	1010a 922 1165	2004	IX Harrisburg, **IX Fort Wayne-South Bend**
1253	William Joseph Dendinger	861 900 1082	2004	VII Grand Island
1254	Paul Stagg Coakley^{‡}	1003 855 877	2004	X Salina, **VIII Oklahoma City**
1255	Ronald Paul Herzog	949 1073 1194	2005	XI Alexandria
1256	Paul J. Bradley	1012 1142 1152	2005	Pittsburgh (auxiliary), IV Kalamazoo
1257	Michael Joseph Bransfield	922 887 1045	2005	VIII Wheeling-Charleston
1258	Michael Owen Jackels	1149 1082 1165	2005	VIII Wichita, XII Dubuque
1259	Salvatore Ronald Matano^{‡}	HB1° 844 1001	2005	IX Burlington, **IX Rochester**
1260	Eusebio L. Elizondo Almaguer	1103 1175 1222	2005	**Seattle** (auxiliary)
1261	Joseph J. Tyson^{‡}	1103 1175 1222	2005	Seattle (auxiliary), **VII Yakima**
1262	Kevin Vann^{‡}	1186 1107 1172	2005	III Fort Worth, **IV Orange**
1263	Clarence Richard Silva	973 836 1133	2005	V Honolulu
1264	Denis J. Madden	922 1183 1248	2005	Baltimore (auxiliary)
1265	John Gerard Noonan^{‡}	1020 911 1235	2005	Miami (auxiliary), **V Orlando**
1266	Rutilio del Riego Jáñez	1080 956 FO2	2005	San Bernardino (auxiliary)
1267	R. Walker Nickless	1032 1044 1086	2006	VII Sioux City
1268	Alexander King Sample^{‡}	990 1000 1045	2006	XII Marquette, **XI Portland in Oregon**
1269	George J. Rassas	1075 1113 HL1	2006	Chicago (auxiliary)
1270	Randolph Roque Calvo	1108 907 1162	2006	VII Reno
1271	John Bura	CV3 1043 1131	2006	Philadelphia of the Ukrainians (auxiliary)
1272	David Choby	892 853 963	2006	XI Nashville
1273	Frank Joseph Dewane	912 1020 AO4	2006	II Venice
1274	Daniel Edward Thomas^{‡}	1010a GP1 790	2006	Philadelphia (auxiliary), **VIII Toledo**
1275	Frank Joseph Caggiano^{‡}	1138 848 1105	2006	Brooklyn (auxiliary), **V Bridgeport**
1276	Octavio Cisneros	1138 848 1105	2006	Brooklyn (auxiliary)
1277	Guy Sansaricq	1138 848 1105	2006	Brooklyn (auxiliary)
1278	Paul J. Swain	1016 931 989	2006	VIII Sioux Falls
1279	Daniel E. Flores^{‡}	990 817 1050	2006	Detroit (auxiliary), **VI Brownsville**
1280	John Anthony Dooher	1001 1137 1199	2006	Boston (auxiliary)
1281	Robert Francis Hennessey	1001 1137 1199	2006	**Boston** (auxiliary)
1282	Shelton Fabre^{‡}	949 998 1073	2007	New Orleans (auxiliary), IV Houma–Thibodaux, **XI Louisville**
1283	Glen Provost^{‡}	949 929 1089	2007	**III Lake Charles**
1284	Peter Anthony Libasci^{‡}	1122 1048 1049 1226	2007	Rockville Centre (auxiliary), **X Manchester**
1285	Peter F. Christensen^{‡}	1016 927 931	2007	X Superior, **VIII Boise**
1286	Michael Joseph Hoeppner	1016 872 1095	2007	VII Crookston
1287	William P. Callahan	1198 926 1033	2007	Milwaukee (auxiliary), X La Crosse
1288	Gerald Nicholas Dino	1134 981 1208	2008	IV Phoenix of the Byzantines
1289	James Vann Johnston, Jr.^{‡}	1107 1004 1171	2008	VI Springfield-Cape Girardeau, **IX Kansas City–Saint Joseph**
1290	Michael Duca^{‡}	949 975 1205	2008	II Shreveport, **VI Baton Rouge**
1291	William J. Justice	1108 1162 1270	2008	San Francisco (auxiliary)
1292	James D. Conley^{‡}	1044 1254 1258	2008	Denver (auxiliary), **IX Lincoln**
1293	Oscar Cantú^{‡}	1186 923 1204	2008	San Antonio (auxiliary), II Las Cruces, **III San Jose**
1294	Anthony Taylor^{‡}	901 1096 1177	2008	**VII Little Rock**
1294a	Neil Tiedemann	BE3 IG1 848	2008	III Mandeville, Brooklyn (auxiliary)
1295	Herbert Bevard	1012 1171 1274	2008	V Saint Thomas
1296	Manuel Aurelio Cruz	1033 732 968	2008	**Newark** (auxiliary)
1297	John M. LeVoir	1132 1166 1285	2008	IV New Ulm
1298	Barry Christopher Knestout^{‡}	1012 1206 1241	2008	Washington (auxiliary), **XIII Richmond**
1299	Edward J. Burns^{‡}	1142 1012 1066	2009	V Juneau, **VIII Dallas**
1300	Cirilo Flores	1056 795 1228	2009	Orange (auxiliary), V San Diego

=== 1301–1350 ===
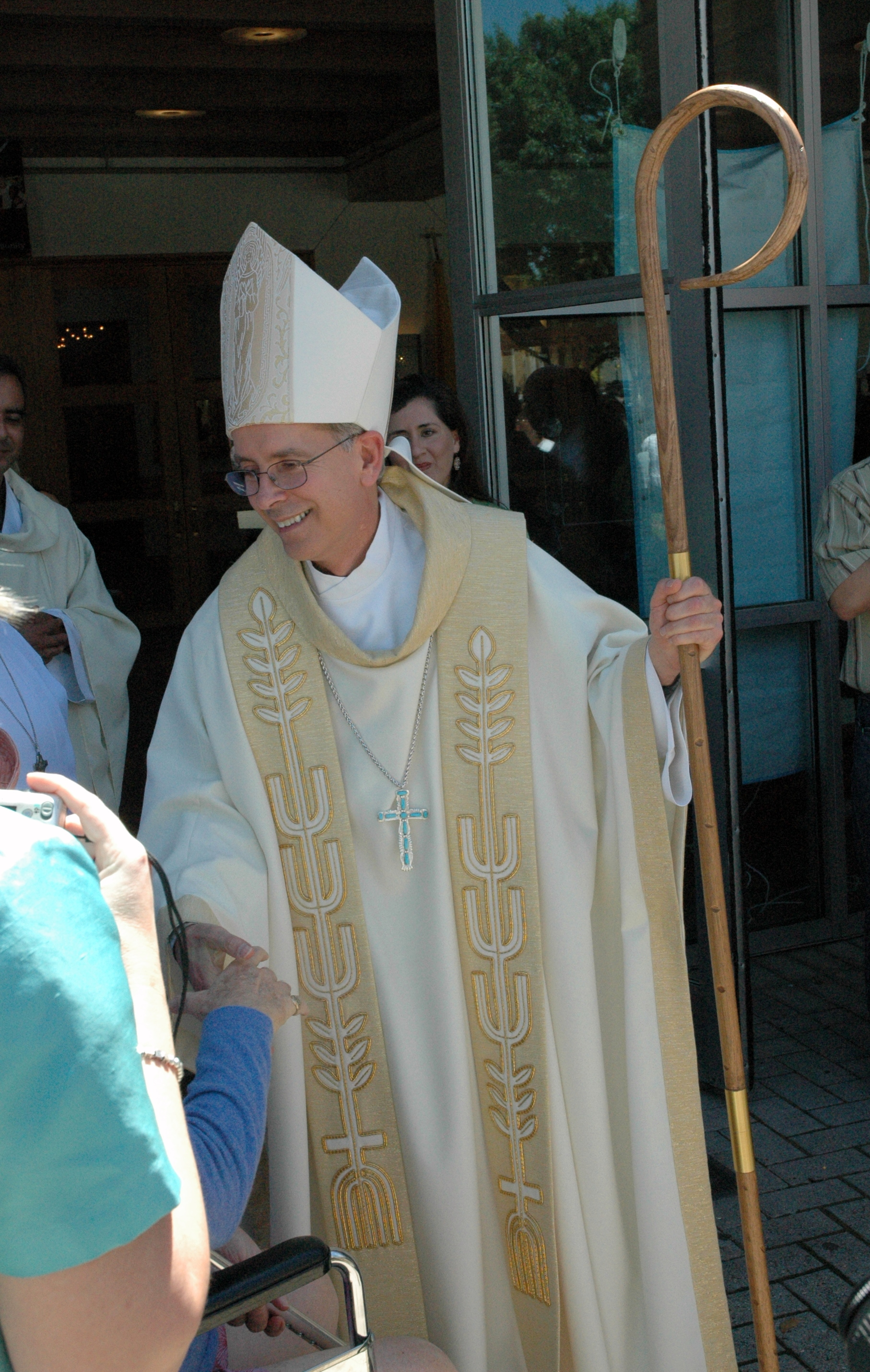
Mark J. Seitz (1318) is the current bishop of El Paso.

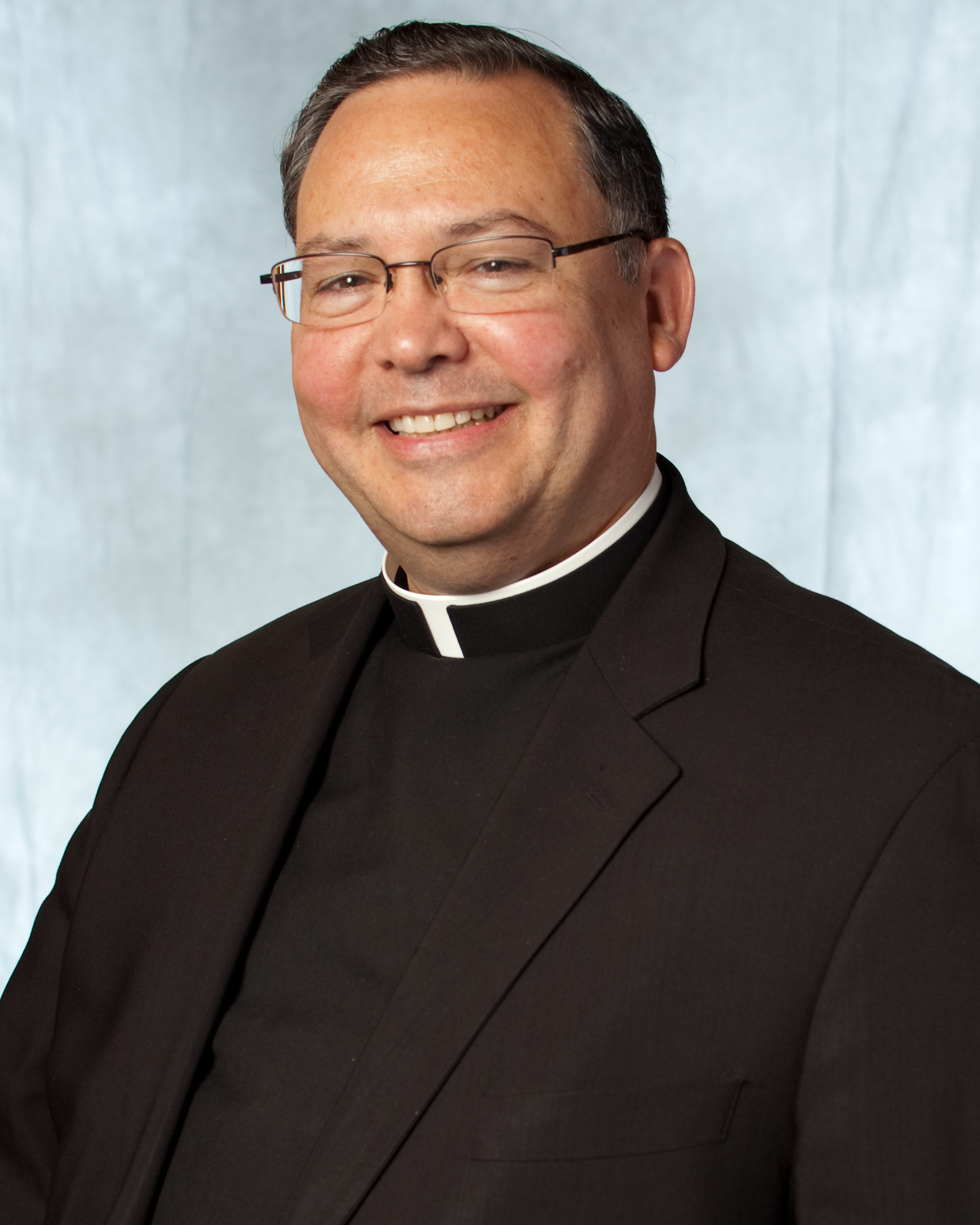
Eduardo Nevares (1322) is an auxiliary bishop of Phoenix.

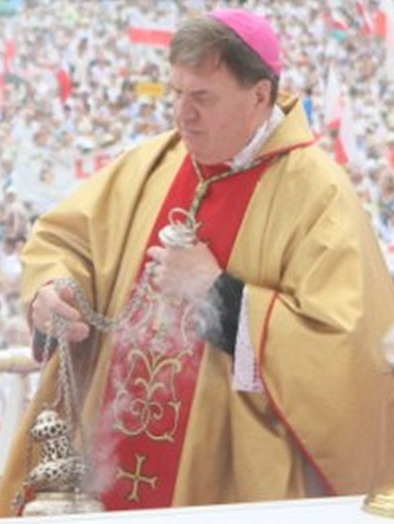
Joseph William Tobin (1331) is the current archbishop of Newark.

No.	Bishop	Consecrators	Year	Diocese
1301	Richard Stika	1010a 1171 1182	2009	III Knoxville
1302	Robert E. Guglielmone	1007 1122 1170	2009	XIII Charleston
1303	James S. Wall^{‡}	975 1165 1185	2009	**IV Gallup**
1304	Lee A. Piché	1132 1016 1297	2009	Saint Paul and Minneapolis (auxiliary)
1305	John Barres^{‡}	1010a 1074 1183	2009	IV Allentown, **V Rockville Centre**
1306	Timothy C. Senior^{‡}	1010a 1257 1274	2009	Philadelphia (auxiliary), **XII Harrisburg**
1307	Luis Rafael Zarama^{‡}	988 901 1005	2009	Atlanta (auxiliary), **VI Raleigh**
1308	Bernard Hebda^{‡}	1133 HM1 966	2009	IV Gaylord, Newark (Coadjutor), **XI Saint Paul and Minneapolis**
1309	Paul D. Etienne^{‡}	1044 1029 1173	2009	VIII Cheyenne, IV Anchorage, Seattle (Coadjutor), **X Seattle**
1310	Fernando Isern	1044 934 1020	2009	IV Pueblo
1311	Paul Sirba	1132 1285 1304	2009	IX Duluth
1312	Robert C. Evans	1086 818 1259	2009	Providence (auxiliary)
1313	Joseph M. Siegel^{‡}	1177 829 1273	2010	Joliet (auxiliary), **VI Evansville**
1314	William Medley^{‡}	1171 892 964	2010	**IV Owensboro**
1314a	Philippos Stephanos Thottathil^{‡}	HO1 IR IS	2010	Tiruvalla (auxiliary), **II Chicago of the Syro-Malankarans of the US and Canada**
1315	William Mulvey	1152 1050 1140	2010	VIII Corpus Christi
1316	Joseph Bambera^{‡}	1010a 873 1110	2010	**X Scranton**
1317	J. Douglas Deshotel^{‡}	1205 947 1290	2010	Dallas (auxiliary), **VII Lafayette in Louisiana**
1318	Mark J. Seitz^{‡}	1205 947 1290	2010	Dallas (auxiliary), **VI El Paso**
1319	Terry R. LaValley^{‡}	1196 1042 1240	2010	**XIV Ogdensburg**
1320	Yousif Habash^{‡}	1123 GV1 HN1	2010	**II Newark of the Syrians**
1321	Timothy Doherty^{‡}	1029 995 1102	2010	**VI Lafayette in Indiana**
1322	Eduardo Nevares	1165 975 1010	2010	**Phoenix** (auxiliary)
1323	David M. O'Connell^{‡}	1036 1012 1033	2010	**X Trenton**
1324	Michael J. Fitzgerald	1010a GP1 1244	2010	Philadelphia (auxiliary)
1325	John J. McIntyre	1010a GP1 1244	2010	**Philadelphia** (auxiliary)
1325a	Venedykt Aleksiychuk^{‡}	II1 IJ1 1208	2010	Lviv (auxiliary), **V Chicago of the Ukrainians**
1326	Robert W. McElroy*^{‡}	1108 748 1162	2010	San Francisco (auxiliary), VI San Diego, **VIII Washington**
1327	F. Richard Spencer	1184 1012 1129	2010	Military Vicar of the United States (auxiliary)
1328	Arthur Kennedy	1001 1199 1281	2010	Boston (auxiliary)
1329	Peter John Uglietto	1001 1137 1280	2010	**Boston** (auxiliary)
1330	Thomas Mar Eusebius	HO1 HP1 HQ1	2010	I Chicago of the Syro-Malankarans of the US and Canada
1331	Joseph William Tobin*^{‡}	HR1 HS1 HT1	2010	XII Indianapolis, **X Newark**
1332	Edward M. Rice^{‡}	989 1145 1301	2011	St. Louis (auxiliary), **VII Springfield-Cape Girardeau**
1333	John Balthasar Brungardt^{‡}	1149 1161 1258	2011	**VI Dodge City**
1334	Neal Buckon	1184 919 1200	2011	**Military Vicar of the United States** (auxiliary)
1335	Christopher J. Coyne^{‡}	1029 1200 1309	2011	Indianapolis (auxiliary), X Burlington, Hartford (Coadjutor), **XIV Hartford**
1336	Mark Leonard Bartchak^{‡}	1010a 1006 1031	2011	**VIII Altoona-Johnstown**
1337	William J. Waltersheid	1142 1245 1274	2011	**Pittsburgh** (auxiliary)
1338	Michael J. Byrnes	1133 1132 1231	2011	Detroit (auxiliary), VIII Agaña
1339	José Cepeda	1133 1132 1231	2011	Detroit (auxiliary), **San Antonio** (auxiliary)
1340	Donald Hanchon	1133 1132 1231	2011	Detroit (auxiliary)
1341	Thomas Anthony Daly^{‡}	1054 1108 1175	2011	San Jose (auxiliary), **VII Spokane**
1342	Joseph R. Binzer	1189 846 1213	2011	Cincinnati (auxiliary)
1343	Charles C. Thompson^{‡}	1171 892 1029 1057	2011	V Evansville, **XIII Indianapolis**
1344	Donald J. Hying^{‡}	1181 926 1196	2011	Milwaukee (auxiliary), IV Gary, **V Madison**
1345	Robert Dwayne Gruss^{‡}	1132 1191 1198	2011	VIII Rapid City, **VII Saginaw**
1346	Mikaël Antoine Mouradian^{‡}	HW1 GS1 HX1 1111	2011	**IV New York of the Armenians of the US and Canada**
1347	Alberto Rojas^{‡}	1075 HY1 1222	2011	Chicago (auxiliary), **III San Bernardino**
1348	Andrew Peter Wypych	1075 HY1 1222	2011	Chicago (auxiliary)
1349	Gregory John Hartmayer^{‡}	988 1115 1307	2011	XIV Savannah, **VIII Atlanta**
1350	David Kagan^{‡}	1132 1059 1102	2011	**VII Bismarck**

=== 1351–1400 ===
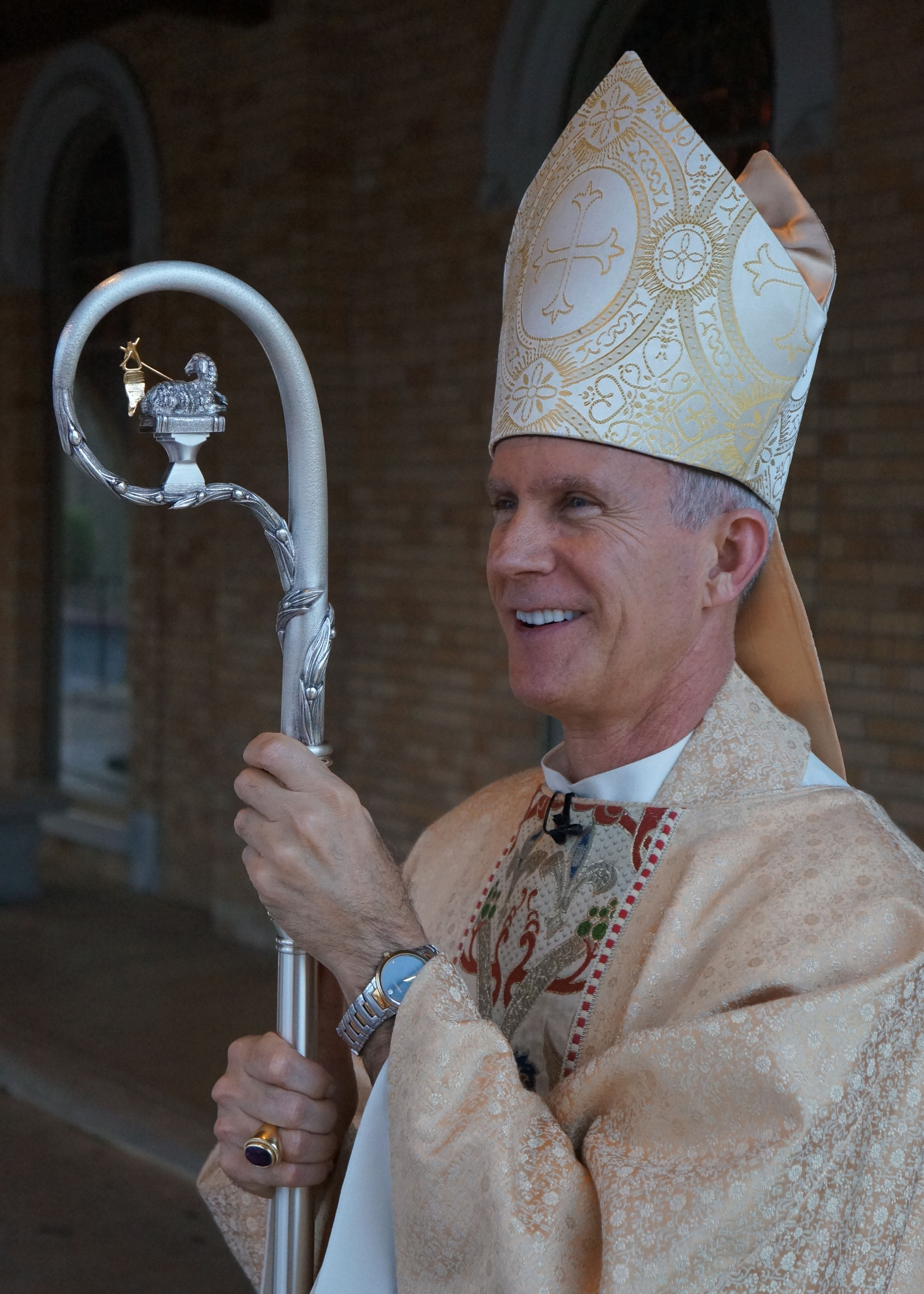
Joseph Strickland (1362) became bishop of Tyler in 2012.

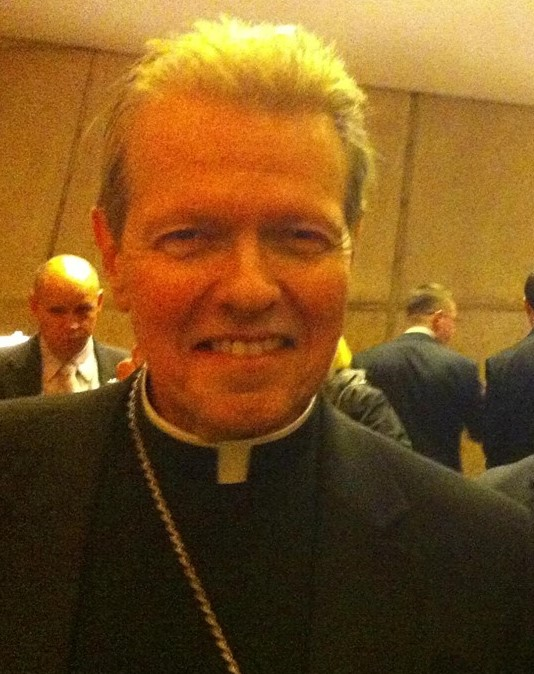
Edward Bernard Scharfenberger (1380) became bishop of Albany in 2014.

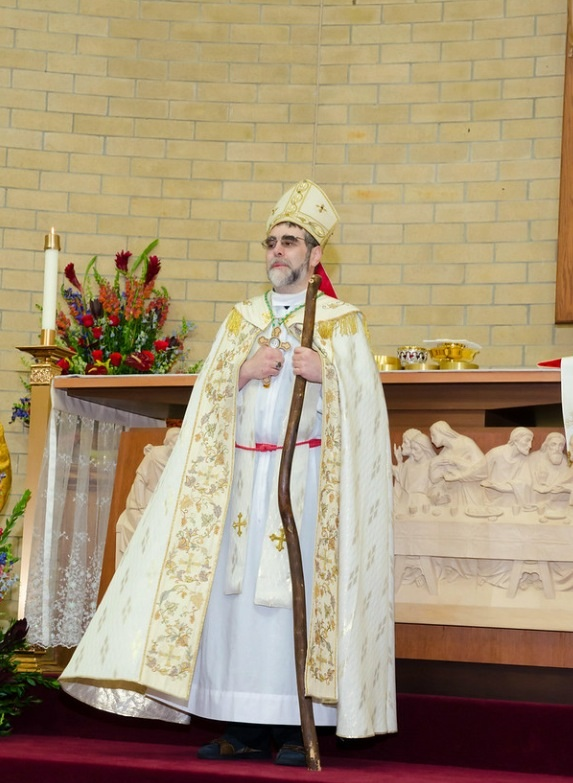
Francis Y. Kalabat (1383) became Eparch of Saint Thomas the Apostle of Detroit in 2014.

No.	Bishop	Consecrators	Year	Diocese
1351	Edward Weisenburger^{‡}	1149 909 1254	2012	XI Salina, VII Tucson, **X Detroit**
1352	George Sheltz	1152 923 1195	2012	Galveston-Houston (auxiliary)
1353	David John Malloy^{‡}	1075 1102 1181	2012	**IX Rockford**
1354	Liam Cary	986 886 1174	2012	VI Baker
1355	Gregory Parkes^{‡}	1147 1235 1265	2012	V Pensacola-Tallahassee, **V St. Petersburg**
1356	Raymond Chappetto	1138 1275 1276	2012	Brooklyn (auxiliary)
1357	Paul Sanchez	1138 1275 1276	2012	Brooklyn (auxiliary)
1358	Robert J. Brennan^{‡}	1122 1044 1226	2012	Rockville Centre (auxiliary), XII Columbus, **VIII Brooklyn**
1359	Nelson Jesus Perez^{‡}	1122 1044 1226	2012	Rockville Centre (auxiliary), XI Cleveland, **XIV Philadelphia**
1360	Jeffrey Marc Monforton	1189 990 1133	2012	V Steubenville, **Detroit** (auxiliary)
1361	Lawrence T. Persico^{‡}	1044 1006 1238	2012	**X Erie**
1362	Joseph Strickland	1152 975 1010	2012	IV Tyler
1362a	Borys Gudziak^{‡}	IP II1 JA	2012	I Paris of the Ukrainians, **VIII Philadelphia of the Ukrainians**
1363	Robert Deeley	1001 1132 1312	2013	Boston (auxiliary), XII Portland in Maine
1364	David Talley^{‡}	988 1307 1349	2013	Atlanta (auxiliary), XII Alexandria, **VI Memphis**
1365	Robert J. Coyle	1184 1122 1302	2013	Military Vicar of the United States (auxiliary), **Rockville Centre** (auxiliary)
1366	Michael C. Barber^{‡}	1214 1053 1341	2013	**V Oakland**
1366a	Milan Lach	IK1 IL1 IM1	2013	Prešov (auxiliary), V Parma of the Byzantines
1367	David John Walkowiak^{‡}	1133 1200 1230	2013	**XII Grand Rapids**
1368	John Folda^{‡}	1132 1198 1292	2013	**VIII Fargo**
1369	Abdallah Elias Zaidan^{‡}	EQ5 1182 GZ2	2013	**III Los Angeles of the Maronites**
1370	Kurt Burnette^{‡}	1208 1210 1288	2013	**V Passaic of the Byzantines**
1371	Andrew H. Cozzens^{‡}	1132 1016 1311	2013	Saint Paul and Minneapolis (auxiliary), **VIII Crookston**
1372	Michael Sis^{‡}	1222 1009 1204	2014	**VI San Angelo**
1373	Michael Fors Olson^{‡}	1222 923 1262	2014	**IV Fort Worth**
1374	Joseph R. Kopacz^{‡}	1194 1221 1316	2014	**XI Jackson**
1375	John Francis Doerfler^{‡}	1133 1173 1268	2014	**XIII Marquette**
1376	Stephen Jay Berg^{‡}	1198 1063 1150	2014	**V Pueblo**
1377	Peter Baldacchino^{‡}	1147 FH2 HZ1	2014	Miami (auxiliary), **III Las Cruces**
1378	Myron Joseph Cotta^{‡}	1179 928 1025	2014	Sacramento (auxiliary), **VI Stockton**
1379	Andrzej Jerzy Zglejszewski	1122 1302 1358	2014	**Rockville Centre** (auxiliary)
1380	Edward Bernard Scharfenberger	1196 882 1138	2014	X Albany
1381	Peter Leslie Smith	1268 986 1354	2014	**Portland in Oregon** (auxiliary)
1382	Carl A. Kemme^{‡}	1149 1172 1224	2014	**IX Wichita**
1383	Francis Y. Kalabat^{‡}	FV3 959 1133	2014	**II Detroit of the Chaldeans**
1384	Peter John Byrne	1196 1202 1250	2014	New York (auxiliary)
1385	John Joseph Jenik	1196 1202 1250	2014	New York (auxiliary)
1386	John Joseph O’Hara	1196 1202 1250	2014	New York (auxiliary)
1387	Steven J. Raica^{‡}	1133 1217 1308	2014	V Gaylord, **V Birmingham**
1388	Joy Alappatt^{‡}	HG2 1193 IA1	2014	Chicago of the Syro-Malabarians (auxiliary), **II Chicago of the Syro-Malabarians**
1389	Bohdan Danylo^{‡}	IB1 807 1209	2014	**II Parma of the Ukrainians**
1390	Chad Zielinski^{‡}	1066 1184 1387	2014	V Fairbanks, **V New Ulm**
1390a	Emanuel Hana Shaleta	FV3 IO1 1383	2015	II Toronto of the Chaldeans, II San Diego of the Chaldeans
1391	Daniel E. Garcia^{‡}	1204 1140 1372	2015	Austin (auxiliary), XV Monterey, **VI Austin**
1392	Joseph G. Hanefeldt^{‡}	1172 1304 1345	2015	**VIII Grand Island**
1393	Fernand J. Cheri	1140 988 992	2015	New Orleans (auxiliary)
1394	Mario E. Dorsonville	1012 IB1 1116	2015	Washington (auxiliary), V Houma–Thibodaux
1395	John Stowe^{‡}	1171 1025 IC1	2015	**III Lexington**
1396	Brendan J. Cahill^{‡}	1152 923 1069	2015	III Victoria, **VII Joliet**
1397	Edward C. Malesic^{‡}	1044 1238 1220	2015	V Greensburg, **XII Cleveland**
1398	James Massa	1138 1122 1356	2015	**Brooklyn** (auxiliary)
1399	Witold Mroziewski	1138 1122 1356	2015	**Brooklyn** (auxiliary)
1400	Robert Barron^{‡}	1186 1098 1163	2015	Los Angeles (auxiliary), **IX Winona-Rochester**

=== 1401–1450 ===
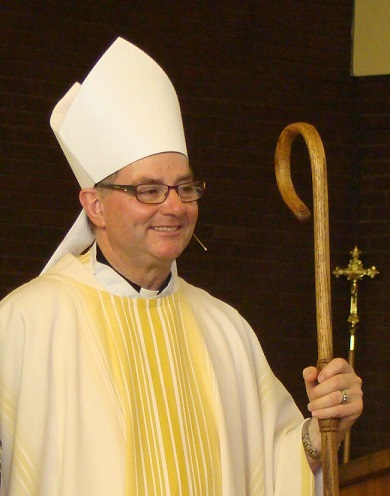
James Patrick Powers (1405) became bishop of Superior in 2016.

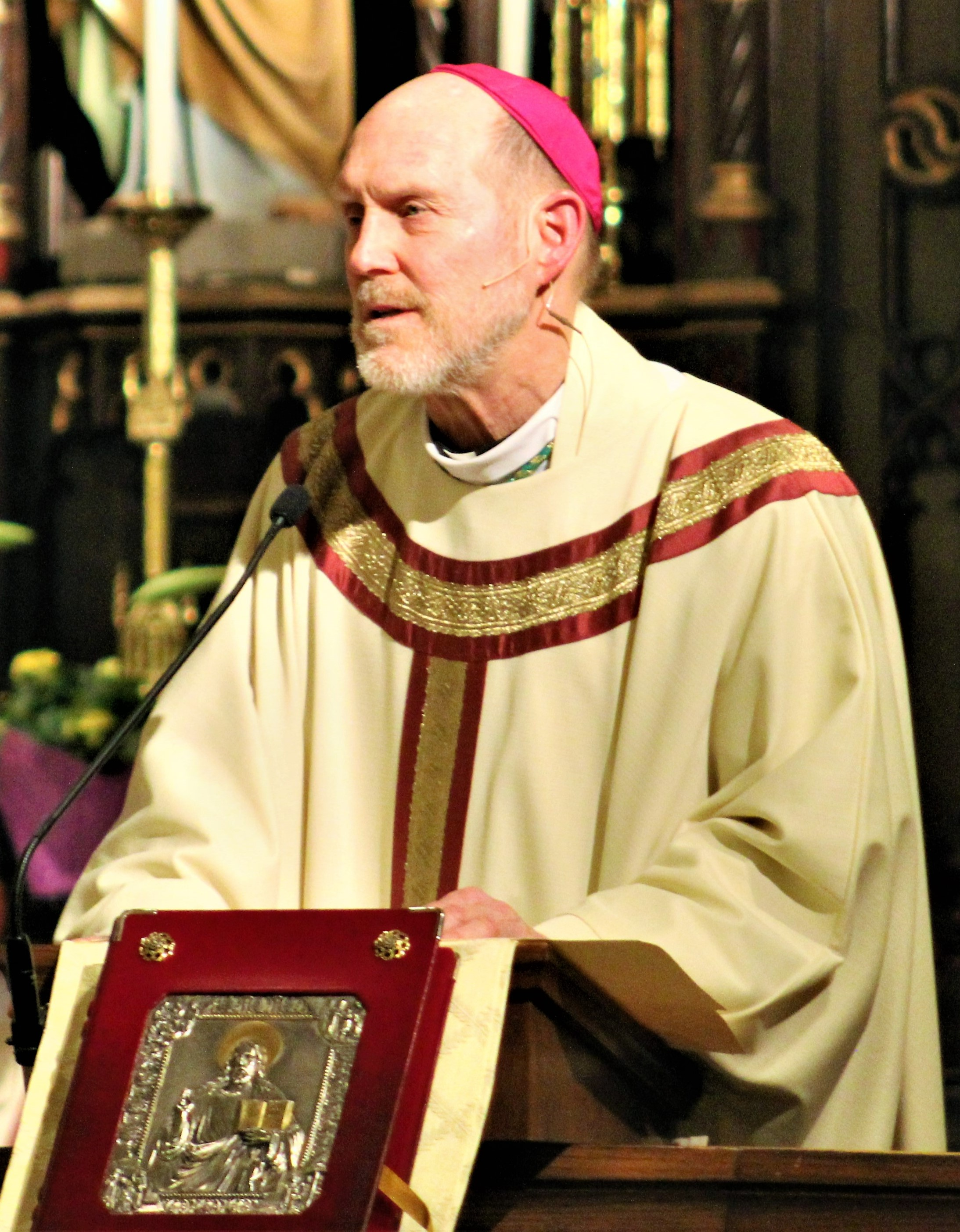
Thomas Zinkula (1427) became bishop of Davenport in 2017

No.	Bishop	Consecrators	Year	Diocese
1401	Joseph V. Brennan^{‡}	1186 1098 1163	2015	Los Angeles (auxiliary), **VI Fresno**
1402	David G. O'Connell	1186 1098 1163	2015	Los Angeles (auxiliary)
1403	Steven J. Lopes^{‡}	ID1 973 1012	2016	**II Personal Ordinary of the Chair of Saint Peter**
1404	John Gregory Kelly^{‡}	1205 975 1317	2016	Dallas (auxiliary), **V Tyler**
1405	James Patrick Powers^{‡}	1181 1285 1309	2016	**XI Superior**
1406	James F. Checchio^{‡}	1033 1148 1249	2016	V Metuchen, New Orleans (Coadjutor), **XIX New Orleans**
1406a	Paul Fitzpatrick Russell	1001 1133 IV	2016	**Detroit** (auxiliary)
1407	David Konderla^{‡}	1254 1096 1204	2016	**IV Tulsa**
1408	Edward Deliman	1044 1220 1359	2016	Philadelphia (auxiliary)
1409	Mark O'Connell^{‡}	1001 1199 1329	2016	Boston (auxiliary), **XI Albany**
1410	Robert P. Reed	1001 1328 1363	2016	**Boston** (auxiliary)
1411	Jorge Rodríguez-Novelo	1198 860 1186	2016	**Denver** (auxiliary)
1412	Robert Milner Coerver^{‡}	1222 1404 987	2016	**III Lubbock**
1413	Timothy Edward Freyer	1262 1186 1179	2017	**Orange** (auxiliary)
1414	Mark Edward Brennan	1116 1129 1012	2017	Baltimore (auxiliary), IX Wheeling-Charleston
1415	Adam John Parker	1116 1129 1012	2017	**Baltimore** (auxiliary)
1416	Gerard William Battersby^{‡}	1133 1231 IH1	2017	Detroit (auxiliary), **XI La Crosse**
1417	Robert Joseph Fisher	1133 1231 IH1	2017	**Detroit** (auxiliary)
1418	Jeffrey Robert Haines	1181 1344 926	2017	**Milwaukee** (auxiliary)
1419	James T. Schuerman	1181 1344 926	2017	**Milwaukee** (auxiliary)
1420	Michael Joseph Boulette	1222 947 1339	2017	San Antonio (auxiliary)
1421	Roy Edward Campbell	1012 1241 1298	2017	Washington (auxiliary)
1422	Louis Frederick Kihneman^{‡}	1194 1225 1315	2017	**IV Biloxi**
1423	Mark Steven Rivituso^{‡}	989 1332 1218	2017	St. Louis (auxiliary), **X Mobile**
1424	Daniel Henry Mueggenborg^{‡}	1177 1407 1260	2017	Seattle (auxiliary),**VIII Reno**
1425	Steven Biegler^{‡}	1198 1345 1309	2017	**IX Cheyenne**
1426	John P. Dolan^{‡}	1326 974 1156	2017	San Diego (auxiliary), **V Phoenix**
1427	Thomas Zinkula^{‡}	1258 1191 1032	2017	IX Davenport, **XI Dubuque**
1428	Bernard Shlesinger	988 1307 1216	2017	**Atlanta** (auxiliary)
1429	William Albert Wack^{‡}	1147 1153 1204	2017	**VI Pensacola-Tallahassee**
1430	Alfred A. Schlert^{‡}	1044 1100 1305	2017	**V Allentown**
1431	Andriy Rabiy	IP 1131 IQ	2017	Philadelphia of the Ukrainians (auxiliary)
1432	Andrew E. Bellisario^{‡}	1309 1066 1299	2017	VI Juneau, **V Anchorage-Juneau**
1433	Enrique Esteban Delgado	1147 1235 1265	2017	**Miami** (auxiliary)
1434	Thanh Thai Nguyen	1262 1235 1170	2017	**Orange** (auxiliary)
1435	J. Mark Spalding^{‡}	1171 1343 1314	2018	**XII Nashville**
1436	Shawn McKnight^{‡}	989 1145 1382	2018	IV Jefferson City, **XI Kansas City in Kansas**
1437	Mario Alberto Avilés^{‡}	1279 876 IT	2018	Brownsville (auxiliary), **IX Corpus Christi**
1438	Joel Matthias Konzen	988 1428 1194	2018	**Atlanta** (auxiliary)
1439	Robert Francis Christian	1214 1162 1366	2018	San Francisco (auxiliary)
1440	Marc Vincent Trudeau	1186 852 1098	2018	**Los Angeles** (auxiliary)
1441	Michael William Fisher^{‡}	1012 1298 1394	2018	Washington (auxiliary), **XV Buffalo**
1442	Richard Garth Henning^{‡}	1305 1122 1358	2018	Rockville Centre (auxiliary), Providence (Coadjutor), IX Providence, **X Boston**
1443	Gerald Lee Vincke^{‡}	1149 1124 1392	2018	**XII Salina**
1444	Mark Andrew Bartosic	1163 1223 1269	2018	**Chicago** (auxiliary)
1445	Robert Gerald Casey^{‡}	1163 1223 1269	2018	Chicago (auxiliary), **XI Cincinnati**
1446	Ronald Aldon Hicks^{‡}	1163 1223 1269	2018	Chicago (auxiliary), VI Joliet, **XIV New York**
1447	Juan Miguel Betancourt	1168 1184 1371	2018	**Hartford** (auxiliary)
1448	Joseph L. Coffey	1184 1044 1196	2019	**Military Vicar of the United States** (auxiliary)
1449	William Muhm	1184 1044 1196	2019	**Military Vicar of the United States** (auxiliary)
1450	Alejandro Dumbrigue Aclan	1186 852 1236	2019	Los Angeles (auxiliary)

=== 1451–1500 ===
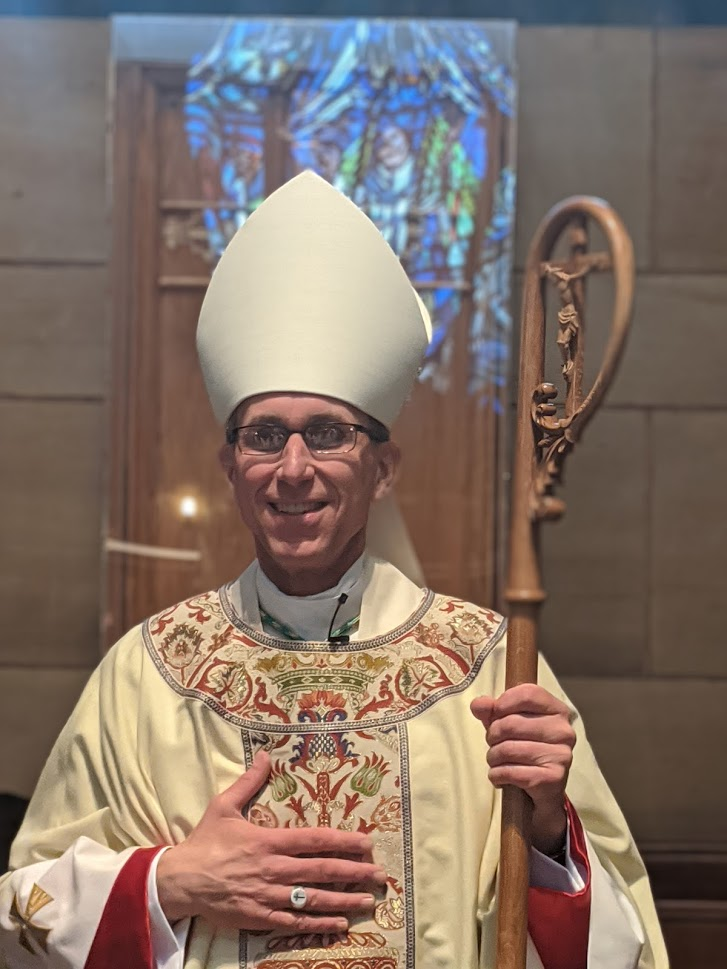
Donald DeGrood (1458) became bishop of Sioux Falls in 2020.

No.	Bishop	Consecrators	Year	Diocese
1451	Douglas Lucia^{‡}	1196 1240 1319	2019	**XI Syracuse**
1452	William Michael Joensen^{‡}	1258 1267 1427	2019	**X Des Moines**
1453	Austin Anthony Vetter^{‡}	1268 1406 1350	2019	**XI Helena**
1454	Gerardo Joseph Colacicco	1196 1087 1250	2019	**New York** (auxiliary)
1455	Edmund James Whalen	1196 1087 1250	2019	**New York** (auxiliary)
1456	Francis Ignatius Malone	1140 1290 1294	2020	III Shreveport
1457	Robert John McClory^{‡}	1343 1133 967	2020	**V Gary**
1458	Donald DeGrood^{‡}	1308 1278 1371	2020	**IX Sioux Falls**
1459	Luis Miguel Romero Fernández	1305 1358 1122	2020	**Rockville Centre** (auxiliary)
1460	Elias R. Lorenzo	1331 1296 1247	2020	**Newark** (auxiliary)
1461	Michael A. Saporito^{‡}	1331 1296 1247	2020	Newark (auxiliary), **VI Metuchen**
1462	Gregory J. Studerus	1331 1296 1247	2020	Newark (auxiliary)
1463	Kevin J. Sweeney^{‡}	1331 1138 1180	2020	**VIII Paterson**
1464	Peter Michael Muhich	1308 1458 1345	2020	VII Rapid City
1465	Ramon Bejarano^{‡}	1326 1222 1378	2020	San Diego (auxiliary), **XVI Monterey**
1466	Michael G. McGovern^{‡}	1163 1118 1269	2020	IX Belleville, **X Omaha**
1467	Louis Tylka^{‡}	1163 1181 IU	2020	**IX Peoria**
1468	Bruce Lewandowski^{‡}	1116 1325 1415	2020	Baltimore (auxiliary), **X Providence**
1469	Robert W. Marshall^{‡}	1140 992 1364	2020	**XIII Alexandria**
1470	David Toups^{‡}	1152 1299 1037	2020	**VI Beaumont**
1471	Stephen D. Parkes^{‡}	1349 1265 1355	2020	**XV Savannah**
1472	Robert J. Lombardo	1163 1126 1160	2020	**Chicago** (auxiliary)
1473	Jeffrey S. Grob^{‡}	1163 1126 1160	2020	Chicago (auxiliary), **XII Milwaukee**
1474	Kevin M. Birmingham	1163 1126 1160	2020	Chicago (auxiliary)
1475	William Draper Byrne^{‡}	1001 1406 1453	2020	**X Springfield**
1476	David Bonnar^{‡}	1189 1256 1142	2021	**VI Youngstown**
1477	Larry James Kulick^{‡}	1359 1238 1397	2021	**VI Greensburg**
1478	Jerome Feudjio^{‡}	988 1001 1012	2021	**VI Saint Thomas**
1479	Gary W. Janak	1222 1420 1396	2021	**San Antonio** (auxiliary)
1480	Daniel John Felton^{‡}	1308 1224 1173	2021	**X Duluth**
1481	James R. Golka^{‡}	1198 1392 1150	2021	III Colorado Springs, **IX Denver**
1482	Italo Dell’Oro	1152 1396 1372	2021	**Galveston-Houston** (auxiliary)
1483	William Edward Koenig^{‡}	1116 1305 1183	2021	**X Wilmington**
1484	Gregory W. Gordon	1175 950 1190	2021	**Las Vegas** (auxiliary)
1485	John C. Iffert^{‡}	1171 1211 1466	2021	**XI Covington**
1486	Mark Eckman^{‡}	1142 1299 1476	2022	Pittsburgh (auxiliary), **XIII Pittsburgh**
1487	Joseph Andrew Williams^{‡}	1308 1187 1371	2022	Saint Paul and Minneapolis (auxiliary), Camden (Coadjutor), **IX Camden**
1488	John S. Bonnici^{‡}	1196 1386 1250	2022	New York (auxiliary), **X Rochester**
1489	Joseph A. Espaillat	1196 1386 1250	2022	**New York** (auxiliary)
1490	Jeffrey Walsh^{‡}	1133 1230 1316	2022	**VI Gaylord**
1491	Frank R. Schuster	1309 1177 1261	2022	**Seattle** (auxiliary)
1492	Jacques E. Fabre^{‡}	988 1349 1307	2022	**XIV Charleston**
1493	Earl K. Fernandes^{‡}	1189 1358 IU	2022	**XIII Columbus**
1494	Jeffrey M. Fleming^{‡}	1139 1268 1453	2022	Great Falls-Billings (Coadjutor), **VIII Great Falls-Billings**
1495	Erik T. Pohlmeier^{‡}	1147 1235 1294	2022	**XI St. Augustine**
1496	Michael G. Woost	1397 1192 1191	2022	**Cleveland** (auxiliary)
1497	Francois Beyrouti^{‡}	IW 1060 1362a	2022	**VII Newton of the Melkites**
1498	John-Nhan Tran	1349 1140 949	2023	**Atlanta** (auxiliary)
1499	Patrick Neary^{‡}	1308 1381 1429	2023	**X Saint Cloud**
1500	Juan Esposito-Garcia	988 1394 1421	2023	**Washington** (auxiliary)

=== 1501–1550 ===
No.	Bishop	Consecrators	Year	Diocese
1501	Evelio Menjivar-Ayala^{‡}	988 1394 1421	2023	Washington (auxiliary), **X Wheeling-Charleston**
1502	Anthony Cerdan Celino	1318 1222 1395	2023	**El Paso** (auxiliary)
1503	Michael Izen	1308 1371 1487	2023	**Saint Paul and Minneapolis** (auxiliary)
1504	Edward M. Lohse^{‡}	1133 1256 1361	2023	**V Kalamazoo**
1505	Albert Bahhuth	1186 1154 1450	2023	**Los Angeles** (auxiliary)
1506	Matthew Elshoff	1186 1154 1450	2023	**Los Angeles** (auxiliary)
1507	Brian Nunes	1186 1154 1450	2023	**Los Angeles** (auxiliary)
1508	Slawomir Szkredka	1186 1154 1450	2023	**Los Angeles** (auxiliary)
1509	Michael Pham^{‡}	1326 1261 1426	2023	San Diego (auxiliary), **VII San Diego**
1510	Felipe Pulido	1326 1261 1426	2023	**San Diego** (auxiliary)
1511	Steven Maekawa^{‡}	1432 1366 1390	2023	**VI Fairbanks**
1512	Robert Mark Pipta^{‡}	1208 1370 IX	2023	**VI Parma of the Byzantines**
1513	Cristiano Borro Barbosa	1001 1409 1410	2024	**Boston** (auxiliary)
1514	Keith J. Chylinski	1359 1216 1325	2024	**Philadelphia** (auxiliary)
1515	Christopher R. Cooke	1359 1216 1325	2024	**Philadelphia** (auxiliary)
1516	Efren V. Esmilla	1359 1216 1325	2024	**Philadelphia** (auxiliary)
1517	James T. Ruggieri^{‡}	1001 1363 1442	2024	**XIII Portland**
1518	Michael Thomas Martin^{‡}	1349 IU 1234	2024	**V Charlotte**
1519	Reynaldo Bersabal	1179 936 IZ	2024	**Sacramento** (auxiliary)
1520	Parsegh Baghdassarian	FQ 1346 IY	2024	**Our Lady of Nareg in the United States and Canada** (auxiliary)
1521	John Joseph McDermott^{‡}	1001 1335 1259	2024	**XI Burlington**
1522	James Mark Beckman^{‡}	1282 1289 1435	2024	**IV Knoxville**
1523	Scott E. Bullock^{‡}	1308 1452 1458	2024	**X Rapid City**
1524	Dennis Gerard Walsh^{‡}	1427 1191 1274	2024	**X Davenport**
1525	Kevin Kenney	1308 1285 1481	2024	**Saint Paul and Minneapolis** (auxiliary)
1526	Dennis E. Spies	1446 1177 1313	2024	**Joliet** (auxiliary)
1527	Artur Bubnevych^{‡}	1208 1370 1512	2025	**VI Phoenix of the Byzantines**
1528	Robert Fedek	1163 1445 1473	2025	**Chicago** (auxiliary)
1529	José Maria Garcia Maldonado	1163 1445 1473	2025	**Chicago** (auxiliary)
1530	Timothy J. O'Malley	1163 1445 1473	2025	**Chicago** (auxiliary)
1531	John S. Siemianowski	1163 1445 1473	2025	**Chicago** (auxiliary)
1532	Lawrence J. Sullivan	1163 1445 1473	2025	**Chicago** (auxiliary)
1533	Richard Francis Reidy^{‡}	1335 1164 1517	2025	**VI Norwich**
1534	John Edward Keehner^{‡}	1427 1267 1476	2025	**VIII Sioux City**
1535	Gregg M. Caggianelli	1184 1273 1470	2025	**Military Vicar of the United States** (auxiliary)
1536	Simon Peter Engurait^{‡}	1140 1061 1282	2025	**VI Houma–Thibodaux**
1537	Pedro Bismarck Chau	1331 1247 1462	2025	**Newark** (auxiliary)
1538	Thomas J. Hennen^{‡}	1268 1354 1524	2025	**VII Baker**
1539	Ralph Bernard O'Donnell^{‡}	1248 1436 1466	2025	**V Jefferson City**
1540	Andres Cantoria Ligot	1293 1186 1236	2025	**San Jose** (auxiliary)
1541	Peter Dai Bui	1426 1165 1322	2026	**Phoenix** (auxiliary)
1542	James Misko^{‡}	1162 1204 1391	2026	**VIII Tucson**
1543	Manuel de Jesús Rodríguez^{‡}	1147 1104 1358	2026	**VI Palm Beach**
1544	Godfrey Mullen^{‡}	1163 1466 1481	2026	**X Belleville**
1545	John Jairo Gomez^{‡}	1222 1404 1090	2026	**II Laredo**
1546	Robert P. Boxie	1326 988 1414	2026	**Washington** (auxiliary)
1547	Gary Studniewski	1326 988 1414	2026	**Washington** (auxiliary)
1548	Emilio Biosca Agüero^{‡}	1147 1001 1273	2026	**III Venice in Florida**
1549	Michael T. Castori^{‡}	1214 1263 1366	2026	**VI Honolulu**

== Abbreviations and notes ==
=== Foreign consecrators ===
- AA=Titular Bishop of Rama
- AB=Bishop of Havana
- AC=Titular Bishop of Tricala
- AD=Bishop of Mexico
- AE=Titular Bishop of Athens
- AF=Titular Bishop of Cyrene
- AG=Latin Patriarch of Jerusalem
- AH=Titular Bishop of Seleucia
- AI=Titular Bishop of Ephesus
- AJ=Archbishop of Fermo
- AK=Titular Bishop of Ancyra
- AL=Bishop of Porto
- AM=Bishop of Saint-Malo
- AN=Bishop of Terracina, Sezze, and Priverno
- AO=Archbishop of Dublin
- AP=Bishop of Ossory
- AQ=Bishop of Cork
- AR= Titular Bishop of Aria
- AS=Bishop of Kildare and Leighlin
- AT=Archbishop of Cashel
- AU=Archbishop of Rouen
- AV=Bishop of Versailles
- AW=Bishop of Beauvais
- AX=Titular Bishop of Rhesaina
- AY=Bishop of Monterrey
- AZ=Titular Bishop of Tanagra
- BA=Titular Archbishop of Nazianzus
- BB=Titular Archbishop of Tarsus
- BC=Titular Bishop of Porphyreon
- BD=Bishop of Montreal
- BE=Bishop of Kingston
- BF=Titular Bishop of Martyropolis
- BG=Bishop of Halifax
- BH=Titular Bishop of Augustopolis in Phrygia
- BI=Titular Bishop of Trajanopolis
- BJ=Bishop of Belley-Ars
- BK=Bishop of Lausanne
- BL=Titular Archbishop of Thebes
- BM=Bishop of Città di Castello
- BN=Bishop of Ross
- BO=Titular Bishop of Derbe
- BP=Archbishop of Tours
- BQ=Bishop of Le Mans
- BR=Bishop of Toronto
- BS=Bishop of Valence
- BT=Archbishop of Munich and Freising
- BU=Titular Archbishop of Melitene
- BV=Bishop of Osimo and Cingoli
- BW=Bishop of Clermont
- BX=Bishop of Le Puy-en-Velay
- BY=Bishop of Vancouver
- BZ=Archbishop of Rennes
- CA=Bishop of Quimper
- CB=Titular Archbishop of Thessalonica
- CC=Bishop of Fano
- CD=Titular Bishop of Troas
- CE=Vicar Apostolic of Hong Kong
- CF=Bishop of Sankt Gallen
- CG=Bishop of Basel
- CH=Bishop of Barcelona
- CI=Bishop of Vic
- CJ=Bishop of Lleida
- CK=Titular Archbishop of Lepanto
- CL=Bishop of Victoria
- CM=Bishop of San Luis Potosí
- CN=Titular Archbishop of Trapezus
- CO=Titular Archbishop of Nicaea
- CP=Titular Archbishop of Caesarea in Palaestina
- CQ=Titular Archbishop of Nicopolis in Epiro
- CR=Titular Archbishop of Laodicea in Phyrgia
- CS=Titular Archbishop of Tyana
- CT=Archbishop of Santiago de Cuba
- CU=Titular Archbishop of Larissa in Thessalia
- CV=Metropolitan of Lviv
- CW=Bishop of Przemyśl
- CX=Bishop of Stanislaviv
- CY=Titular Bishop of Petra
- CZ=Titular Bishop of Philadelphia in Lydia
- DA=Titular Archbishop of Darnis
- DB=Titular Archbishop of Edessa
- DC=Titular Archbishop of Corinth
- DD=Titular Bishop of Sinitis
- DE=Archbishop of Winnipeg
- DF=Bishop of Sabina
- DG=Titular Archbishop of Colossae
- DH=Titular Bishop of Tiberias
- DI=Titular Bishop of Lydda
- DJ=Bishop of Jaro
- DK=Eparch of Križevci
- DL=Eparch of Lungro
- DM=Bishop of Morelia
- DN=Titular Archbishop of Caesarea in Mauretania
- DO=Titular Bishop of Lampsacus
- DP=Titular Bishop of Themisonium
- DQ=Bishop of Macau
- DR=Bishop of Nueva Segovia
- DS=Titular Archbishop of Dioclea
- DT=Cardinal Priest of Santi Giovanni e Paolo, Rome
- DU=Titular Archbishop of Heraclea in Europe
- DV=Titular Archbishop of Philippopolis in Thrace
- DW=Titular Bishop of Tuscamia
- DX=Titular Archbishop of Apamea in Syria
- DY=Titular Archbishop of Theodosiopolis in Arcadia
- DZ=Ukrainian Catholic Archeparch of Winnipeg
- EA=Ukrainian Catholic Eparch of Edmonton
- EB=Bishop of Nelson
- EC=Titular Archbishop of Philippi
- ED=Titular Archbishop of Neapolis in Pisidia
- EE=Titular Bishop of Lystra
- EF=Bishop of Basse-Terre
- EG=Titular Archbishop of Myra
- EH=Greek Catholic Patriarch of Antioch
- EI=Titular Archbishop of Pelusium
- EJ=Titular Archbishop of Nubia
- EK=Titular Archbishop of Adana
- EL=Bishop of Imola
- EM=Ukrainian Catholic Eparch of Toronto
- EN=Titular Archbishop of Severiana
- EO=Archbishop of Guatemala
- EP=Bishop of San Marcos
- EQ=Maronite Catholic Patriarch of Antioch
- ER=Titular Archbishop of Nisibi of the Maronites
- ES=Bishop of Baalbek of the Maronites
- ET=Archbishop of Gwangju
- EU=Archbishop of Aleppo of the Greek Melkite Catholics
- EV=Archbishop of Acre of the Greek Melkite Catholics
- EW=Archbishop of Latakia of the Greek Melkite Catholics
- EX=Titular Archbishop of Christopolis
- EY=Bishop of Comayagua
- EZ=Titular Archbishop of Malliana
- FA=Titular Bishop of Putia in Numidia
- FB=Titular Bishop of Hermonthis
- FC=Titular Bishop of Tzernicus
- FD=Titular Archbishop of Iconium
- FE=Titular Archbishop of Serdica
- FF=Archbishop of Utrecht
- FG=Archbishop of Armagh
- FH=Bishop of Nassau
- FI=Titular Archbishop of Zuri
- FJ=Archbishop of Cali
- FK=Archbishop of Tamale
- FL=Bishop of Arecibo
- FM=Bishop of Mayagüez
- FN=Archbishop of Bangalore
- FO=Titular Archbishop of Thagora
- FP=Bishop of Coroico
- FQ=Armenian Catholic Patriarch of Cilicia
- FR=Titular Archbishop of Colonia
- FS=Titular Archbishop of Comana
- FT=Bishop of Tehuacán
- FU=Titular Archbishop of Feradi Maius
- FV=Chaldean Catholic Patriarch of Babylon
- FW=Titular Archbishop of Kaškar of the Chaldeans
- FX=Chaldean Catholic Archeparch of Mosul
- FY=Archbishop of Erbil of the Chaldeans
- FZ=Archbishop of Basra of the Chaldeans
- GA=Chaldean Catholic Bishop of Alqosh
- GB=Chaldean Catholic Bishop of Aqra
- GC=Titular Archbishop of Drivastum
- GD=Titular Archbishop of Mauriana
- GE=Titular Bishop of Bosana
- GF=Archbishop of Cotonou
- GG=Titular Archbishop of Novaliciana
- GH=Bishop of Marbel
- GI=Melkite Eparch of Saint-Sauveur de Montréal
- GJ=Titular Archbishop of Vescovio
- GK=Melkite Greek Eparch of Nuestra Señora del Paraíso en México
- GL=Titular Archbishop of Palmyra of the Greek Melkites
- GM=Titular Archbishop of Amiternum
- GN=Titular Archbishop of Tharros
- GO=Bishop of Saint John's-Basseterre
- GP=Titular Archbishop of Neapolis in Proconsulari
- GQ=Bishop of Opole
- GR=Titular Archbishop of Apollonia
- GS=Titular Bishop of Amida of the Armenians
- GT=Syriac Catholic Patriarch of Antioch
- GU=Archbishop of Damascus of the Syriacs
- GV=Archbishop of Aleppo of the Syriacs
- GW=Titular Archbishop of Horta
- GX=Ukrainian Catholic Eparch of Saskatoon
- GY=Greek Catholic Archbishop of Făgăraş and Alba Iulia
- GZ=Archeparch of Antelias of the Maronites
- HA=Titular Archbishop of Africa
- HB=Titular Archbishop of Celene
- HC=Titular Bishop of Rusellae
- HD=Titular Bishop of Acre of the Maronites
- HE=Titular Archbishop of Nova Caesaris
- HF=Titular Bishop of Cilibia
- HG=Major Archbishop of Ernakulam-Angamaly
- HH=Bishop of Palai
- HI=Bishop of Kottayam
- HJ=Bishop of Saint George's in Grenada
- HK=Bishop of Nuevo Laredo
- HL=Titular Bishop of Castellum Ripae
- HM=Titular Archbishop of Coeliana
- HN=Titular Archbishop of Tagritum
- HO=Archbishop of Trivandrum
- HP=Bishop of Muvattupuzha
- HQ=Bishop of Mavelikara
- HR=Bishop of Frascati
- HS=Archbishop of Ljubljana
- HT=Vicar General of Rome
- HW=Archbishop of Aleppo of the Armenians
- HX=Archbishop of Adana of the Armenians
- HY=Military Ordinary of Poland
- HZ=Bishop of Kingston in Jamaica
- IA=Bishop of Irinjalakuda
- IB=Archbishop of Tegucigalpa
- IC=Bishop of San Isidro de El General
- ID=Bishop of Regensburg
- IE=Titular Bishop of Cresima
- IF=Titular Bishop of Serta
- IG=Bishop of Montego Bay
- IH=Titular Bishop of Novi
- II=Ukrainian Catholic Archeparchy of Lviv
- IJ=Ukrainian Catholic Eparchy of Sambir-Drohobych
- IK=Slovak Catholic Metropolitan Archeparchy of Prešov
- IL=Slovak Catholic Eparchy of Košice
- IM=Slovak Catholic Eparchy of Bratislava
- IN=Patriarch of Babylon of the Chaldeans
- IO=Chaldean Catholic Patriarchate of Babylon
- IP=Major Archbishop of Kyiv-Galicia
- IQ=Ukrainian Catholic Bishop of Edmonton
- IR=Archeparch of Tiruvalla
- IS=Eparch of Pathanamthitta
- IT=Bishop of Matamoros
- IU=Titular Archbishop of Gunela
- IV=Archbishop of St Andrews and Edinburgh
- IW=Melkite Catholic Patiarch of Antioch
- IX=Eparch of Mukachevo
- IY=Eparch of Sainte-Croix-de-Paris
- IZ=Archbishop of Cagayan de Oro
- JA=Apostolic Exarch for Ukrainians in the Great Britain

=== Other abbreviations ===
- F=Priest who was not a bishop
- PP=Pope
- PR=Bishop of Puerto Rico

== See also ==
- Appointment of Catholic bishops
- Catholic Church hierarchy
- Catholic Church in the United States
- Historical list of the Catholic bishops of Puerto Rico
- List of bishops of the Episcopal Church in the United States of America
- List of Catholic bishops of the United States
- Lists of patriarchs, archbishops, and bishops

== Bibliography ==
Bishops numbered 1 through 1061 are sourced in Bransom (1990). Bishops numbered 1062 and higher are sourced in Cheney (2014).

== Sources ==
- Bransom, Charles N. (1990). Ordinations of U.S. Catholic Bishops, 1790–1989. Washington, D.C.: United States Catholic Conference. ISBN 1-55586-323-X.
- Cheney, David M. (2014). "Catholic-Hierarchy: Its Bishops and Dioceses, Current and Past".
