= Larry J. Kulick =

American prelate of the Catholic Church (born 1966)

His Excellency, The Most Reverend Larry James Kulick JCL
- Bishop of Greensburg
- Diocese: Diocese of Greensburg
- Appointed: December 18, 2020
- Installed: February 11, 2021
- Predecessor: Edward C. Malesic
- Previous post: Diocesan Administrator Diocesan Vicar General

Orders
- Ordination: May 16, 1992 by Anthony G. Bosco
- Consecration: February 11, 2021 by Nelson J. Perez, Lawrence Eugene Brandt, and Edward C. Malesic

Personal details
- Born: February 24, 1966 (age 60) Natrona Heights, Pennsylvania, U.S.
- Education: Saint Vincent College (BA, MA, M.Div.); Catholic University of America (JCL)
- Motto: Christus est veritas "Christ is the truth"

Styles of Larry James Kulick
- Reference style: His Excellency; The Most Reverend
- Spoken style: Your Excellency
- Religious style: Bishop

Larry James Kulick JCL (born February 24, 1966) is an American Catholic prelate who has served as bishop of Greensburg in Pennsylvania since 2021.

== Biography ==
=== Early life ===
Larry Kulick was born on February 24, 1966, in Natrona Heights, Pennsylvania, to Larry J. Kulick Sr. and Myrna Dolores Coleman Kulick. He grew up in Leechburg, Pennsylvania, and he attended St. Joseph High School, also in Natrona Heights. His paternal grandparents emigrated to the United States from Nová Bystrica and Stará Bystrica of the Kysuce region in Slovakia.

Kulick then entered Saint Vincent College in Unity Township, Pennsylvania, where he received a Bachelor of Arts degree in philosophy. He continued his studies at Saint Vincent Seminary in Latrobe, Pennsylvania. He earned a Master of Arts degree in systematic theology in 1991 and a Master of Divinity degree in 1992.

=== Priesthood ===
On May 16, 1992, Kulick was ordained to the priesthood for the Diocese of Greensburg by Bishop Anthony G. Bosco at Blessed Sacrament Cathedral in Greensburg. After his 1992 ordination, the diocese assigned Kulick as parochial vicar at the following parishes in Pennsylvania:

- Blessed Sacrament Cathedral Parish (1992 to 1995)
- Immaculate Conception Parish in Irwin (1995 to 1997)

Kulick in 1997 was named pastor of Good Shepherd Parish in Kent, Pennsylvania. Two years later, he was also appointed as consultant on priestly vocations for the diocese. The diocese moved Kulick in 2002 to be pastor of St. Joseph Parish in New Kensington, Pennsylvania, a posting he would hold for the next six years.

In 2008, Kulick was promoted to director of clergy vocations by the diocese. He moved to Washington D.C. in 2010 to study at the Catholic University of America (CUA). He was awarded a Licentiate of Canon Law in 2012 from The Catholic University of America's School of Canon Law.

Returning to Greensburg in 2012, Kulick was appointed pastor of St. James Parish in New Alexandria, Pennsylvania. That same year, Bishop Edward C. Malesic named Kulick as vicar general and moderator of the clergy. A member of the Order of the Holy Sepulchre since 2011, he was elevated to knight commander on October 31, 2015.

When the Vatican appointed Malesic as bishop of the Diocese of Cleveland in 2020, Kulick was appointed as administrator of the Diocese of Greensburg.

=== Bishop of Greensburg ===
Pope Francis appointed Kulick bishop as bishop of Greensburg on December 18, 2020. He was consecrated as a bishop on February 11, 2021, at Blessed Sacrament Cathedral by Archbishop Nelson J. Perez, with Bishop Edward C. Malesic and Bishop Emeritus Lawrence Brandt acting as co-consecrators. Kulick became the first priest from the diocese to be appointed its bishop.

Kulick is active in the First Catholic Slovak Union, where he served as a chaplain for over 25 years. His coat of arms closely resembles the Slovak coat of arms. He is also a classic car enthusiast, and has hosted many classic car shows and rides for both personal enjoyment and parish fundraisers. Kulick is especially fond of Pontiacs and owns a 1966 Pontiac LeMans.

== Distinctions ==
=== Foreign orders ===
- Holy See: Knight of the Order of the Holy Sepulchre

== See also ==
- Catholic Church hierarchy
- Catholic Church in the United States
- Historical list of the Catholic bishops of the United States
- List of Catholic bishops of the United States
- Lists of patriarchs, archbishops, and bishops

== Episcopal succession ==
Catholic Church titles
Preceded by Edward C. Malesic	Bishop of Greensburg; 2021-Present	Succeeded by Incumbent
