= Varacalli =

Varacalli is a surname. Notable people with the surname include:

- Ernest Varacalli (born 1944), American mobster
- Joseph A. Varacalli (born 1952), American sociologist
