= John O'Connor (cardinal) =

American Roman Catholic bishop and cardinal

His Eminence John O'Connor
- Cardinal, Archbishop of New York
- See: Archdiocese of New York
- Appointed: January 26, 1984
- Installed: March 19, 1984
- Term ended: May 3, 2000
- Predecessor: Terence Cooke
- Successor: Edward Egan
- Other post: Cardinal-Priest of Ss. Giovanni e Paolo
- Previous post: Bishop of Scranton (1983–1984) Auxiliary Bishop of the Archdiocese for the Military Services) (1979–1983)

Orders
- Ordination: December 15, 1945 by Hugh L. Lamb
- Consecration: May 27, 1979 by Pope John Paul II
- Created cardinal: May 25, 1985 by Pope John Paul II
- Rank: Cardinal Priest

Personal details
- Born: January 15, 1920 Philadelphia, Pennsylvania, U.S.
- Died: May 3, 2000 (aged 80) New York City, U.S.
- Buried: St. Patrick's Cathedral, New York
- Denomination: Roman Catholicism
- Education: St. Charles Borromeo Seminary; Villanova University; Georgetown University
- Motto: There Can Be No Love Without Justice
- Military career
- Allegiance: United States
- Branch: United States Navy
- Service years: 1952–1979
- Rank: Rear admiral
- Commands: Chief of Chaplains of the Navy
- Conflicts: Korean War

Ordination history of John O'Connor
History
Priestly ordination
- Place: Cathedral Basilica of Saints Peter and Paul, Philadelphia, Pennsylvania, United States
Episcopal consecration
- Consecrated by: Pope John Paul II
- Date: May 27, 1979
- Place: St. Peter's Basilica, Rome, Italy
Episcopal succession
Bishops consecrated by John O'Connor as principal consecrator
- Alfred Jolson: February 6, 1988
- Patrick Sheridan: December 12, 1990
- James Michael Moynihan: May 29, 1995
- Edwin Frederick O'Brien: March 25, 1996
- Robert Anthony Brucato: August 25, 1997
- James Francis McCarthy: June 29, 1999

John Joseph O'Connor (January 15, 1920 – May 3, 2000) was an American Catholic prelate who served as Archbishop of New York from 1984 until his death in 2000, and was made a cardinal in 1985.

O'Connor previously served as a U.S. Navy chaplain (1952 to 1979), including four years as chief of chaplains, as an auxiliary bishop of the Military Vicariate of the United States (1979 to 1983), and as Bishop of Scranton from 1983 to 1984.

== Biography ==
=== Early life ===
John O'Connor was born in Philadelphia on January 15, 1920, the fourth of five children of Thomas J. O'Connor, and Dorothy Magdalene (née Gomple) O'Connor. Thomas was a painter and Dorothy was the daughter of Gustave Gumpel, a kosher butcher and Jewish rabbi. In 2014, it was discovered that Dorothy was baptized a Catholic at age 19 and that the couple wed one year later.

O'Connor attended public schools in Philadelphia until his junior year of high school, when he enrolled in West Philadelphia Catholic High School for Boys. Having decided to become a priest, he then enrolled at St. Charles Borromeo Seminary in Wynnewood, Pennsylvania.

=== Priesthood ===
After graduating from St. Charles, O'Connor was ordained a priest for the Archdiocese of Philadelphia on December 15, 1945, in Philadelphia by Auxiliary Bishop Hugh L. Lamb. After his 1945 ordination, the archdiocese assigned O'Connor as a faculty member at St. James High School in Chester, Pennsylvania. During this seven-year period, O'Connor obtained a Master of Arts degree in advanced ethics from Villanova University in Philadelphia and a Master of Arts degree in clinical psychology from the Catholic University of America in Washington, D.C.

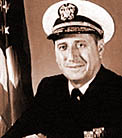
Rear Admiral O'Connor in the US Navy Chaplain Corps

O'Connor joined the United States Navy Chaplain Corps in 1952 during the Korean War.He was eventually named rear admiral and chief of chaplains of the Navy in 1975.He obtained approval for the establishment of the RP [Religious Program Specialist] Enlisted Rating and oversaw the process of standing up this rating. The RP rating provided chaplains with a dedicated enlisted community. The Vatican named O'Connor an honorary prelate of his holiness on October 27, 1966.

O'Connor received a doctorate in political science from Georgetown University in Washington, D.C., where he studied under future United Nations ambassador Jeane Kirkpatrick. Kirkpatrick said of O'Connor that he was "... surely one of the two or three smartest graduate students I've ever had."

=== Auxiliary Bishop of the Military Vicariate US ===
On April 24, 1979, Pope John Paul II appointed O'Connor as an auxiliary bishop of the Military Vicariate for the United States and titular bishop of Cursola. He was consecrated to the episcopate on May 27, 1979, at St. Peter's Basilica in Rome by John Paul himself, with Cardinals Duraisamy Lourdusamy and Eduardo Somalo acting as co-consecrators.

=== Bishop of Scranton ===
On May 6, 1983, John Paul II named O'Connor as bishop of Scranton; he was installed in that position on June 29, 1983.

=== Archbishop of New York ===
Styles of John O'Connor
- Reference style: His Eminence
- Spoken style: Your Eminence
- Informal style: Cardinal
- See: New York

On January 26, 1984, after the death of Cardinal Terence Cooke, O'Connor was appointed archbishop of New York and administrator of the Military Vicariate by John Paul II; O'Connor was installed on March 19, 1984.

O'Connor was elevated to cardinal in the May 25, 1985, consistory, with the titular church of Santi Giovanni e Paolo in Rome (the traditional one for the Archbishop of New York from 1946 to 2009).

On December 10, 1989, 4,500 members of ACT UP and Women's Health Action and Mobilization (WHAM) demonstrated at St. Patrick's Cathedral in Manhattan to voice their opposition to O'Connor's positions on HIV/AIDS education, the distribution of condoms in public schools, and abortion rights for women. Police arrested 43 protestors from inside the cathedral.

Throughout his tenure as archbishop of New York, Cardinal O'Connor advocated on behalf of many groups whom he believed to be downtrodden, but there was no group that he advocated for more strongly than the unborn. To that end, O'Connor started a religious order of women known as the Sisters of Life, which still exists today.

O'Connor had a close relationship with Pope John Paul II, and both leaders were very similar in their emphasis, including a focus on the sanctity of human life from conception to natural death. When naming O'Connor the Archbishop of New York in 1984, the pope is purported to have said "I want someone like myself in New York". In 1995, for the 50th anniversary of the founding of the United Nations, Pope Saint John Paul II visited New York and while there, O'Connor hosted him at Saint Patrick's Cathedral for a rosary service on October 7, 1995 for which O'Connor appointed Joseph Polchinski as one of the servers.

=== Illness and death ===
When O'Connor reached the retirement age for bishops of 75 years in January 1995, he submitted his resignation to Pope John Paul II as required by canon law. However the pope did not accept the resignation, and O'Connor continued to serve as Archbishop of New York until his death.

O'Connor was diagnosed in 1999 with a brain tumor, and died in the archbishop's residence in Manhattan on May 3, 2000. He was interred in the crypt beneath the main altar of St. Patrick's Cathedral. His funeral was presided over by Cardinal Secretary of State Angelo Sodano. At O'Connor's request, Cardinal Bernard F. Law delivered the homily and Cardinal William W. Baum the eulogy. Attendees at O'Connor's funeral included:

- Secretary-General of the United Nations Kofi Annan
- US president Bill Clinton, First Lady Hillary Clinton and Vice President Al Gore
- Secretary of State Madeleine Albright
- former president George H. W. Bush and Texas governor George W. Bush
- New York governor George Pataki
- New York City mayor Rudolph Giuliani, former New York City mayors Ed Koch and David Dinkins.

== Legacy ==
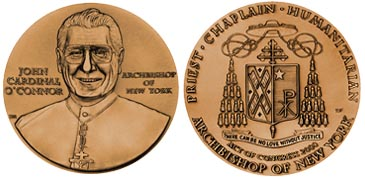
Congressional Gold Medal awarded to O'Connor

- The John Cardinal O'Connor Pavilion in the Bronx, a residence for retired priests, opened in 2003.
- The John Cardinal O'Connor School in Irvington, New York, for students with learning differences, opened in 2009.
- The Cardinal O'Connor Conference on Life is held annually at Georgetown University.

The New York Times called O'Connor "a familiar and towering presence, a leader whose views and personality were forcefully injected into the great civic debates of his time, a man who considered himself a conciliator, but who never hesitated to be a combatant", and one of the Catholic Church's "most powerful symbols on moral and political issues."

== Awards ==
- Jackie Robinson Empire State Medal of Freedom – December 21, 2000
- Congressional Gold Medal – March 7, 2000

== Viewpoints ==
=== Human life ===
O'Connor was a forceful opponent of abortion, human cloning, capital punishment, human trafficking, and unjust war.

- O'Connor in 1996 assailed what he called the "horror of euthanasia", asking rhetorically, "What makes us think that permitted lawful suicide will not become obligated suicide?"
- In 2000, O'Connor called for a "major overhaul" of the punitive Rockefeller drug laws in New York State, which he believed produced "grave injustices".

=== US foreign policy ===
- In the 1980s, O'Connor condemned US support for counterrevolutionary guerrilla forces in Central America, opposed the U.S. mining of the waters off Nicaragua, questioned government spending on new weapons systems, and preached caution in regard to American military actions abroad.
- In 1998, O'Connor questioned whether the United States' cruise missile strikes on Afghanistan and Sudan were morally justifiable.
- In 1999, during the Kosovo War, O'Connor repeatedly challenged the morality of NATO's bombing campaign of Yugoslavia, suggesting that it did not meet the Catholic Church's criteria for a just war. At one point, he asked, "Does the relentless bombing of Yugoslavia prove the power of the Western world or its weakness?"
- In 1998. O'Connor insisted that the traditional just war principles must be applied to evaluate the morality of military responses to unconventional warfare and terrorism.

=== Organized labor ===
In 1984, SEIU 1199, the largest health care workers union in New York City, went on strike against the League of Voluntary Hospitals, of which the archdiocesan hospitals were members. O'Connor strongly criticized the League for threatening to fire striking union members. He called it "strikebreaking" and vowed that no Catholic hospital would participate in such an action. After a year of stalled negotiations, O'Connor threatened to make a separate agreement with the SEIU 1199 "that gives justice to the workers". In a Labor Day homily at St. Patrick's in 1986, O'Connor said:

"[S]o many of our freedoms in this country, so much of the building up of society, is precisely attributable to the union movement, a movement that I personally will defend despite the weakness of some of its members, despite the corruption with which we are all familiar that pervades all society, a movement that I personally will defend with my life."

In 1987, the television broadcast employees' union went on strike against the National Broadcasting Company (NBC). At one point, a non-union crew from NBC appeared at O'Connor's residence to cover a press conference. O'Connor declined to admit them, directing his secretary to "tell them they're not invited."

Following O'Connor's death in 2002, SEIU 1199 called him "the patron saint of working people". It described his support for low-wage and other workers, his efforts in helping the limousine drivers unionize, his help in mediating a labor strike at The Daily News, and his pushing for fringe benefits for minimum-wage home health care workers.

=== Relations with Jewish community ===
- In 1987, Nobel Laureate Elie Wiesel called O'Connor, "a good Christian" and a man "who understands our pain."
- O'Connor in 1996 strongly denounced anti-Semitism, declaring that one "cannot be a faithful Christian and an anti-Semite. They are incompatible, because anti-Semitism is a sin." He wrote an apology to Jewish leaders in New York City for past harm committed by the Catholic Church to the Jewish community.
- In 1998, O'Connor criticized the failure of Swiss banks to compensate Jewish Holocaust victims whose stolen assets had been deposited in Switzerland during World War II by German Nazi leaders. He called it "a human rights issue, an issue of the human race." Even when disagreeing with him over political questions, Jewish leaders acknowledged that O'Connor was "a friend, a powerful voice against anti-Semitism".
- The Jewish Council for Public Affairs in 2000 called O'Connor "a true friend and champion of Catholic–Jewish relations, [and] a humanitarian who used the power of his pulpit to advocate for disadvantaged people throughout the world and in his own community."

=== Relations with the LGBT community ===
==== HIV/AIDS ====
In the early 1980s, O'Connor opened a specialized HIV/AIDS medical unit in St. Clare's Hospital in Manhattan, the first of its kind in the state. ACT UP (AIDS Coalition to Unleash Power) protested in front of St. Patrick's Cathedral in 1987, holding placards such as "Cardinal O'Connor Loves Gay People ... If They Are Dying of AIDS."

O'Connor made an effort to minister to 1,000 people dying of HIV/AIDS and their families, following up on other HIV/AIDS patients. He visited Saint Vincent's Catholic Medical Center, where he cleaned the sores and emptied the bedpans of more than 1,100 patients. According to reports, O'Connor was popular with the Saint Vincent's patients, many of whom did not know he was the archbishop, and was supportive of other priests who ministered to gay men and others with HIV/AIDS.

In 1987, US president Ronald Reagan appointed O'Connor to the President's Commission on the HIV Epidemic, also known as the Watkins Commission. O'Connor served with 12 other members, few of whom were HIV/AIDS experts. HIV/AIDS researchers and activists initially criticized the commission members as lacking expertise on the disease and as being in disarray. The commission report in 1988 called for anti-bias laws to protect HIV-positive patients, on-demand treatment for those with substance abuse problems, and the speeding of HIV/AIDS-related research. The New York Times praised the commission's "remarkable strides" and its proposed US$2 billion campaign against HIV/AIDS among drug users.

==== Hate crimes against LGBTQ ====
O'Connor led the 1990 funeral Mass at St. Joseph's Church in Staten Island for James Zappalorti, a murdered gay man. O'Connor later endorsed a statewide hate crime law that included crimes motivated by sexual orientation, which passed shortly after his own death in 2000.

==== Job discrimination against LGBTQ ====
O'Connor actively opposed an attempt by the City of New York to outlaw sexual discrimination by its contractors. In 1980, Mayor Ed Koch issued Executive Order 50, which required all city contractors, including religious entities, to provide services on a non-discriminatory basis with respect to race, creed, age, sex, handicap, as well as "sexual orientation or affectational preference".

When the city warned the Salvation Army that its contracts for child care services would be canceled if it failed to comply, the archdiocese threatened to cancel its contracts if given the same warning. O'Connor maintained that the executive order would cause the Catholic Church to appear to condone homosexual activity. Writing in Catholic New York in January 1985, O'Connor characterized the order as "an exceedingly dangerous precedent [that would] invite unacceptable governmental intrusion into and excessive entanglement with the Church's conducting of its own internal affairs." Drawing the traditional Catholic distinction between homosexual "inclinations" and "behavior", he stated that "we do not believe that homosexual behavior ... should be elevated to a protected category."

We do not believe that religious agencies should be required to employ those engaging in or advocating homosexual behavior. We are willing to consider on a case-by-case basis the employment of individuals who have engaged in or may at some future time engage in homosexual behavior. We approach those who have engaged in or may engage in what the Church considers illicit heterosexual behavior the same way. ...We believe, however, that only a religious agency itself can properly determine the requirements of any particular job within that agency, and whether or not a particular individual meets or is reasonably likely to meet such requirements.

After a protracted legal battle, the New York Court of Appeals in 1986 upheld lower court decisions striking down Executive Order 50.

O'Connor opposed city and state legislation guaranteeing LGBTQ civil rights, including legislation prohibiting discrimination based upon sexual orientation in housing, public accommodations and employment.

==== St. Patrick's Day parade and LGBTQ participation ====
O'Connor supported the 1993 decision by the Ancient Order of Hibernians, which operated the St. Patrick's Day parade in Manhattan, to bar the Irish Lesbian and Gay Organization from marching under its own banner. The Hibernians argued that the First Amendment of the US Constitution protected their decision and that they could not be compelled to admit a group whose beliefs conflicted with theirs. The city subsequently denied the Hibernians a permit for the parade. However, in 1993, a federal judge in New York held that the city's permit denial was "patently unconstitutional" because the parade was private, not public, and constituted "a pristine form of speech" as to which the parade sponsor had a right to control the content and tone.

In 1987, O'Connor prohibited DignityUSA, an organization of LGBTQ Catholics, from holding Masses in parishes in the archdiocese. After eight years of protests by the group, O'Connor started meeting with DignityUSA twice a year.

==== Condom use for HIV/AIDS prevention ====
O'Connor opposed condom distribution as an HIV/AIDS-prevention measure. He viewed condom use as contravening the Catholic Church's teaching that contraception is immoral and its use a sin. O'Connor rejected the argument that condoms distributed to gay men were not contraceptives. O'Connor's response was that using an "evil act" was not justified by good intentions, and that the church should not be seen as encouraging sinful acts among others (other fertile heterosexual couples who might wrongly interpret his narrow support as license for their own contraception). O'Connor in 1993 stated that sexual abstinence is a sure way to prevent HIV/AIDs infection. He claimed condoms were only 50% effective against HIV transmission. HIV activist group ACT UP (AIDS Coalition to Unleash Power) criticized the cardinal's opinion, leading to confrontations between the group and O'Connor.

=== Theodore McCarrick ===
In April 1986, O'Connor strongly endorsed the appointment of Theodore McCarrick, then bishop of the Diocese of Metuchen, as archbishop of the Archdiocese of Newark. However, in 1992 and 1993, O'Connor received several anonymous letters accusing McCarrick of sexually abusing seminarians, which he sent copies of to McCarrick. In 1994, before a papal visit by Pope John Paul II to the United States, the apostolic nuncio to the U.S., Cardinal Agostino Cacciavillan, became concerned about the pope visiting Newark, as he had heard rumors that McCarrick had engaged in inappropriate sexual behavior in Newark with seminarians. O'Connor conducted an investigation for Cacciavillan and concluded that there were "no impediments" to visiting that city.

In October 1996, when two psychiatrists judged that a priest's charge of sexual abuse by McCarrick was credible, O'Connor remained skeptical. That same month, however, he intervened to prevent a priest "too closely identified" with McCarrick from becoming an auxiliary bishop. O'Connor cited "a rather unsettled climate of opinion about certain issues" in Newark.

In October 1999, when John Paul II was considering transferring McCarrick to a more important archdiocese, O'Connor wrote a letter to the apostolic nuncio to the U.S. and the Congregation for Bishops. It summarized the charges against McCarrick, especially his repeatedly arrangement of seminarians and other men to share his bed, and concluded: "I regret that I would have to recommend very strongly against such promotion." According to reports, the pope read the letter.

McCarrick learned about O'Connor's letter from contacts in the Curia. In August 2000, several months after O'Connor's death, McCarrick sent a rebuttal to John Paul II, which allegedly convinced the pope to appoint him Archbishop of Washington. McCarrick resigned in disgrace from the College of Cardinals in 2018, and was defrocked in 2019.

== Cited works ==
- Earley, James B. (1994). Envisioning Faith: The Pictorial History of the Diocese of Scranton. Devon, Pennsylvania: W.T. Cooke Publishing.
- Feldman, Douglas A.; Wang Miller, Julia (1998). The AIDS Crisis: A Documentary History. Westport, Connecticut: Greenwood Press. ISBN 978-0-313-28715-2.
- Glenn, Charles L. (2002). The Ambiguous Embrace: Government and Faith-Based Schools and Social Agencies. Princeton, New Jersey: Princeton University Press. ISBN 978-0-691-09280-5.
- Golway, Terry (2001). Full of Grace: An Oral Biography of John Cardinal O'Connor. New York: Simon & Schuster. ISBN 978-0-7434-4814-7.
- Hentoff, Nat (1988). John Cardinal O'Connor: At the Storm Center of a Changing American Catholic Church. New York: Charles Scribner's Sons. ISBN 978-0-684-18944-4.
- Keller, Daniella E.; Gregory, David L. (2012). "O'Connor, John Cardinal (1920–2009)". In Coulter, Michael L.; Myers, Richard S.; Varacalli, Joseph A. (eds.). Encyclopedia of Catholic Social Thought, Social Science, and Social Policy. Vol. 3. Lanham, Maryland: Scarecrow Press. pp. 248–251. ISBN 978-0-8108-8266-9.
- Marlin, George J.; Miner, Brad (2017). Sons of Saint Patrick: A History of the Archbishops of New York, from Dagger John to Timmytown. San Francisco, California: Ignatius Press. ISBN 978-1-62164-113-1.
- O'Connor, John J. (1990). "Abortion: Questions and Answers". The Human Life Review. 16 (3). New York: The Human Life Foundation: 65–96. ISSN 0097-9783. PMID 11656272.
- O'Connor, John; Koch, Edward I. (1989). His Eminence and Hizzoner. New York: William Morrow & Co. ISBN 978-0-688-07928-4.
- Peddicord, Richard (1996). Gay and Lesbian Rights: A Question: Sexual Ethics or Social Justice?. Kansas City, Missouri: Sheed & Ward. ISBN 978-1-55612-759-5.
- Queen, Edward L. II; Prothero, Stephen R.; Shattuck, Gardiner H., eds. (2001). Encyclopedia of American Religious History. Vol. 2 (2nd ed.). New York: Facts on File. ISBN 978-0-8160-4335-4.
- "Report on the Holy See's institutional knowledge and decision-making process related to former Cardinal Theodore Edgar McCarrick (from 1930 to 2017)" (PDF). Holy See Secretariat of State. November 10, 2020.
- Rudin, James (2012). Cushing, Spellman, O'Connor: The Surprising Story of How Three American Cardinals Transformed Catholic–Jewish Relations. Grand Rapids, Michigan: Wm. B. Eerdmans Publishing Company. ISBN 978-0-8028-6567-0.

Catholic Church titles
Preceded by Thomas Benjamin Fulton	— TITULAR — Bishop of Cursola; 1979–1983	Succeeded by Pedro Luís Guido Scarpa
Preceded by J. Carroll McCormick	Bishop of Scranton; 1983–1984	Succeeded by James Timlin
Preceded by Terence Cooke	Roman Catholic Archbishop of New York; 1984–2000	Succeeded by Edward Egan
Preceded by Terence Cooke	Cardinal-Priest of Santi Giovanni e Paolo; 1985–2000	Succeeded by Edward Egan
Military offices
Preceded by Francis L. Garrett	Chief of Chaplains of the United States Navy; 1975–1979	Succeeded by Ross H. Trower
