= Greensburg Central Catholic High School =

Greensburg Central Catholic Junior-Senior High School
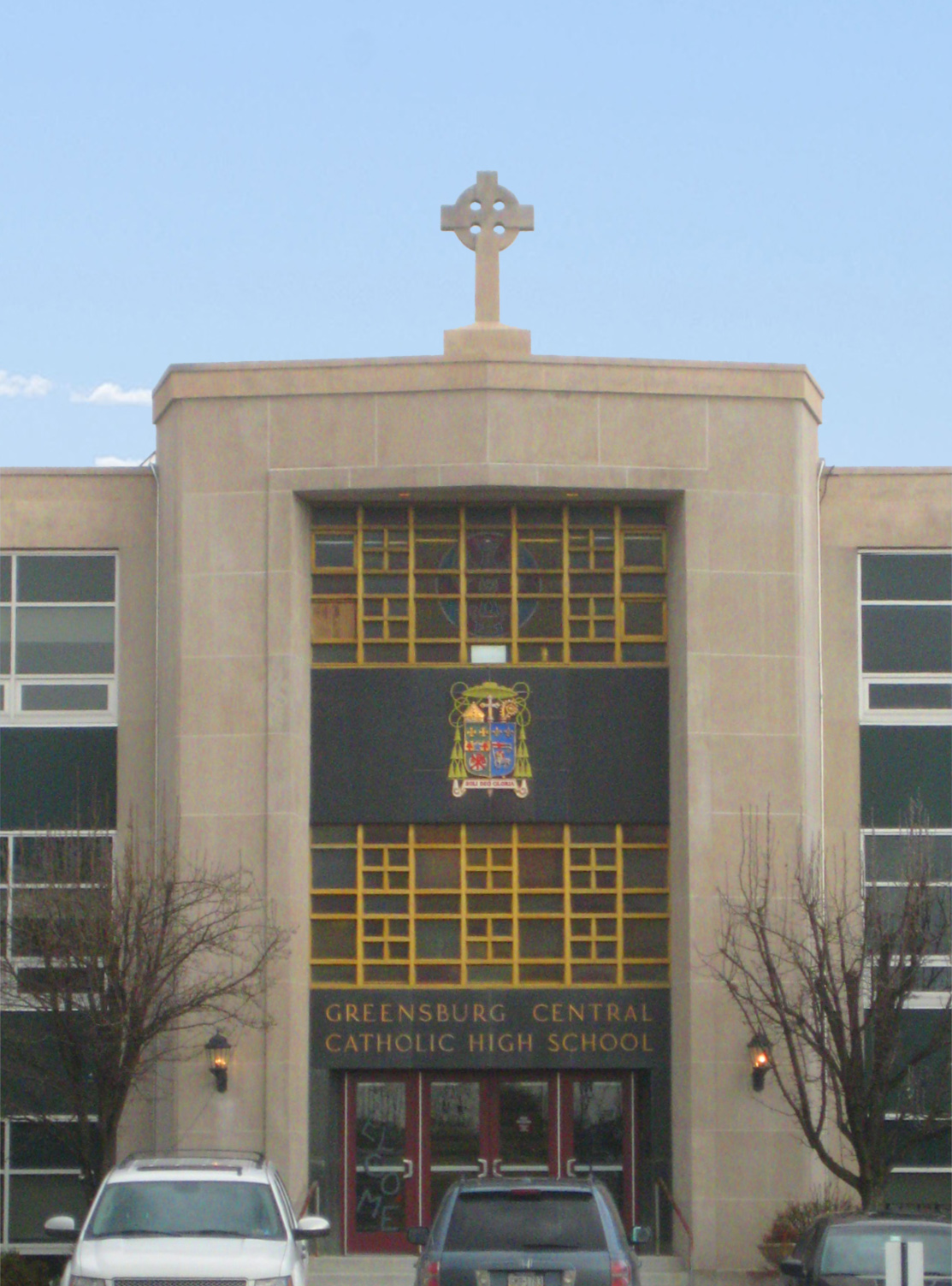

Location
- 911 Armory Dr; Greensburg, (Westmoreland County), Pennsylvania 15601-5209; United States
- 40.2875°N 79.55278°W

Information
- School type: Independent Catholic school
- Motto: Latin: Soli Deo Gloria (Glory to God Alone)
- Religious affiliation: Christianity
- Denomination: Catholic
- Established: September 8, 1959
- Oversight: Diocese of Greensburg
- NCES School ID: 01191207
- Principal: Teresa Szmed
- Chaplain: Fr Jay Jacinto
- Faculty: 28.5 (on an FTE basis)
- Grades: 7–12
- Gender: Coeducational
- Enrollment: 324 (2024-2025)
- Student to teacher ratio: 1:11.5
- Hours in school day: 6.8
- Campus type: Large suburb
- Colors: Maroon & Gray
- Fight song: GCC Alma Mater
- Mascot: Centurion
- Nickname: Centurions
- School fees: $400
- Annual tuition: $14,135
- Affiliation: NCEA, MSA
- Website: gcchs.org

Greensburg Central Catholic High School (GCC) is a Catholic high school located in Greensburg, Pennsylvania, United States, within the Diocese of Greensburg.

== History ==
Construction of Greensburg Central Catholic High School began in the summer of 1958, only seven years after the founding of the Diocese of Greensburg. The first class of freshmen entered in September 1959, including students from as far east as Ligonier and as far west as Trafford and Charleroi.

Bishop Hugh L. Lamb dedicated the building on November 29, 1959, before an audience of 2,000, which included Governor David L. Lawrence as the featured speaker. This large audience was somewhat surprising, given the freezing, snowy weather on the day of the dedication. In fact, according to the Greensburg Tribune-Review:

The former Pittsburgh mayor (Governor Lawrence) not only had to abandon his automobile on a steep grade near the school but was forced to give his address in near darkness and without the use of a public address system. The latter inconveniences occurred when an automobile went out of control, struck a utility pole ... and wrecked the power system.

At the time of Greensburg Central Catholic's founding, six Catholic religious institutes provided most of the faculty. The Sisters of St. Benedict were responsible for teaching languages; the Sisters of Charity, science and music; the Felician Sisters, mathematics; the Sisters of Mercy, English; the Sisters of St. Joseph, social studies; and the Vincentian Sisters of Charity, business. Lay teachers handled physical education.

In 1962, Bishop William G. Connare proposed building a faculty house for all six religious groups, featuring a wing for each community, with a common chapel (the Chapel of the Immaculate Heart of Mary), a dining room, and a community room. The first Mass was offered in this chapel on August 31, 1963.

== Curriculum ==
The school's original curriculum was primarily academic, but it soon added general and business courses. Father Shuda, the school's third principal, urged the construction of an addition to the school, also designed by Francis O'Connor Church. The Fathers' Club and Mothers' Club (now replaced by one group, the Parents' Club) helped with furnishings and installation.

The school offers a diverse curriculum, including Advanced Placement and college-credit courses, as well as business and general studies courses. The school built a stadium in 1989 and installed lights in 1998 for night football and soccer games.

== Campus ==
2011 saw the introduction of a new Junior High program. The school housed the 7th and 8th grades for the first time. Although the junior and senior high schools are mostly separate, certain high school-level courses are available to 8th graders.

== Athletics ==
The athletics program at Greensburg Central Catholic is one of the most successful in the state of Pennsylvania. The school has won three state championships and countless WPIAL titles. The most successful sports program at Central is the ice hockey team, which won three state championships in the 90s and has been a state power for the past twenty years. The football program has received widespread notoriety for back-to-back WPIAL championship game appearances in 2005 and 2006, before winning the WPIAL championship and appearing in the PIAA championship game. The girls' basketball program has been dominant for the past few decades, winning the section title consecutively, as well as WPIAL and PIAA titles. The GCC baseball team also won a Class A PIAA state championship in 2002. Most recently, the girls' volleyball team won the 1A state championship in 2024.

== Notable alumni ==
- Bibiana Boerio
- Joe Kenda
- Warren Schaeffer
- Sean Parnell
