= Ramon Tallaj =

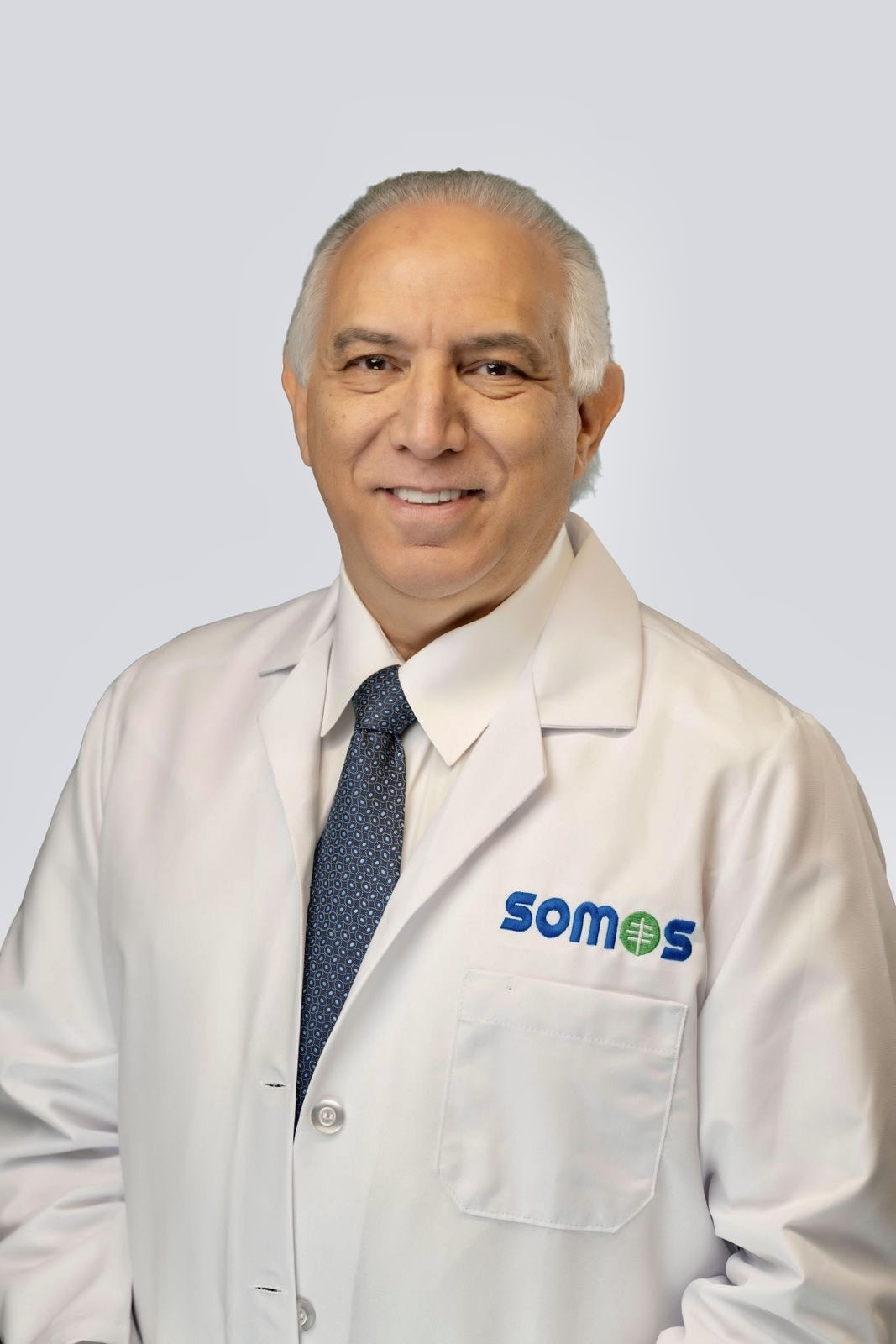
- Born: January 25, 1956 (age 70); Santiago de los Caballeros, Dominican Republic
- Education: Universidad Nacional Pedro Henríquez Ureña (M.D.); St. Luke’s–Roosevelt Hospital Center (Residency)
- Occupations: Physician, Healthcare administrator
- Known for: Founder and Chairman of the Board, (SOMOS Community Care)
- Title: Founder and Chairman of the Board

Dr. Ramon Tallaj (born January 25, 1956) is a Dominican Republic–born American physician and healthcare administrator based in New York City, and a former Undersecretary of Health of the Dominican Republic. He is the Founder and Chairman of SOMOS Community Care, a nonprofit physician-led network of around 3000 providers serving over one million Medicaid and Medicare beneficiaries across New York City's underserved communities.

Dr. Tallaj has been involved in community-based health care for immigrant and underserved communities in New York City, particularly through networks of independent physicians in areas including the Bronx, Queens, Brooklyn and Upper Manhattan. During the COVID-19 pandemic, he was appointed to New York State's Vaccine Distribution and Implementation Task Force and later served as a co-chair of New York City's COVID-19 Recovery Roundtable and Health Equity Task Force.

== Early life and education ==
Tallaj was born in Santiago de los Caballeros, Dominican Republic. He studied medicine at the Universidad Nacional Pedro Henríquez Ureña (UNPHU) School of Medicine, graduating magna cum laude in 1981, and subsequently completed a residency in internal medicine at St. Luke's–Roosevelt Hospital Center in New York City.

According to the Carnegie Corporation of New York, Tallaj later moved to New York City in 1991 to train at St. Luke's-Roosevelt Hospital and established an internal medicine practice in Washington Heights in 1997.

Tallaj moved to the United States from the Dominican Republic at the request of Cardinal John O'Connor, Archbishop of New York, to serve the city's Hispanic immigrant communities. He arrived around 1991, later establishing his practice in Washington Heights in 1997.

== Career ==
=== Medical career ===
Tallaj began his U.S. medical career in the mid-1990s after completing his residency and board certification. He completed his Internal Medicine residency at St. Luke's–Roosevelt Hospital Center in New York City. He established a private internal medicine practice in the Washington Heights neighborhood of Manhattan in 1997, where he provided clinical care primarily to Spanish-speaking and immigrant patients.

The American Medical Association's physician directory lists Ramon M. Tallaj as a physician specializing in internal medicine in Bronx and New York, New York. Montefiore Einstein also lists Ramon M. Tallaj, MD, as an internal medicine physician in the Bronx, with medical education from Universidad Nacional Pedro Henríquez Ureña.

Before his work in New York, Tallaj held public-health roles in the Dominican Republic. The Carnegie Corporation of New York states that he served in government positions, including as undersecretary of public health and social service.

=== SOMOS Community Care ===
In 2015, Tallaj founded SOMOS Community Care, a physician-led nonprofit network formed to support community-based medical practices and improve preventive care, chronic disease management and care coordination for Medicaid and Medicare beneficiaries in New York City's underserved neighborhoods. The Carnegie Corporation described SOMOS in 2020 as a network of more than 2,500 health providers serving 700,000 Medicaid and Medicare beneficiaries. In 2022, the New York City Mayor's Office described SOMOS as a nonprofit of about 3,000 doctors serving about 900,000 Medicaid-reliant patients citywide. The organization became one of New York State's Performing Provider Systems under the Delivery System Reform Incentive Payment (DSRIP) program, a state effort to reform Medicaid delivery systems and emphasize preventive services.

SOMOS was organized as a community-based network of physicians serving many immigrant and low-income patients in New York City. ABC News reported in 2020 that doctors working through SOMOS had spent months on the front lines of the pandemic in predominantly Black and Latino communities, and quoted Tallaj as saying that the organization had provided nearly a quarter-million COVID-19 tests by that point.

SOMOS was one of the Performing Provider Systems in New York State's Delivery System Reform Incentive Payment program, commonly known as DSRIP. City & State New York reported that SOMOS participated in DSRIP projects from 2015 to 2020, including programs aimed at reducing preventable hospital readmissions and improving outcomes for Medicaid patients.

=== COVID-19 pandemic response ===
During the COVID-19 pandemic, SOMOS coordinated outreach and facilitating vaccination efforts for cummunities across New York City and elsewhere. Tallaj oversaw community testing locations, administered vaccines in non-clinical settings and participated in broader efforts to address disparities in pandemic response among immigrant and minority communities.

Fox 5 New York reported that SOMOS provided free COVID-19 and antibody testing in Washington Heights and that Tallaj described the group's doctors as caring for patients in a holistic way.

In 2022, Tallaj was appointed co-chair of the New York City COVID-19 Recovery Roundtable and Health Equity Task Force, an advisory group convened by city government leadership to consider long-term recovery and health equity issues following the acute phase of the pandemic.

In October 2020, Tallaj was listed by New York State as a member of the state's Vaccine Distribution and Implementation Task Force. The state described the task force as a body established to advise on the set-up and operation of New York's COVID-19 vaccination program.

In February 2022, Mayor Eric Adams appointed Tallaj as one of the co-chairs of New York City's COVID-19 Recovery Roundtable and Health Equity Task Force. The Mayor's Office described the task force as bringing together leaders from fields including public health, labour, business, technology, disability advocacy and community organizations to guide the city's recovery from the pandemic.

== Public funding and scrutiny ==
SOMOS has also been the subject of public-policy and media scrutiny because of its role in publicly funded health-care programs. In 2023, The Daily Beast reported on questions raised by good-government advocates about payments and contracts connected to SOMOS and Henry Muñoz III, a political fundraiser associated with the organization. The article stated that a spokesperson for Tallaj and SOMOS declined to discuss the matter on the record.

The Empire Center for Public Policy, a New York-based think tank, also published criticism of state funding to SOMOS, describing it as a politically active medical group and questioning its access to state health-care funds.

== Awards and recognition ==
Tallaj has been recognized with awards including the Ellis Island Medal of Honor in 2006 and has been featured in rankings of influential healthcare leaders. He also received the United Hospital Fund's Excellence in Health Care Award.

Tallaj was also named by the Carnegie Corporation of New York as one of its 2020 "Great Immigrants". The Carnegie profile described him as a physician and founder and chair of SOMOS, and noted his work in community health care and COVID-19 testing. The Carnegie Corporation also lists the Ellis Island Medal of Honor among his honours.

In 2026, the Senate of the Dominican Republic reported that its Public Health Committee had approved a favourable report on a resolution recognizing Tallaj's career for more than 45 years of service and leadership in promoting health-care equity for immigrant communities in New York and the Dominican Republic.

== Philanthropy ==
Tallaj established the Dr. Ramon Tallaj Foundation, which describes its work as supporting health, education and community initiatives connected to Dominican and Latino communities. The Carnegie Corporation states that Tallaj created a foundation to provide scholarships to Dominican and Latino students planning to work in health care and public service.
