= Blessed Sacrament Cathedral =

Blessed Sacrament Cathedral may refer to:

- Cathedral of the Most Blessed Sacrament, Roman Catholic Archdiocese of Detroit
- Cathedral of the Blessed Sacrament, Roman Catholic Diocese of Greensburg
