= Edward C. Malesic =

American Catholic prelate (born 1960)

The Most Reverend Edward Charles Malesic
- Bishop of Cleveland
- Diocese: Cleveland
- Appointed: July 16, 2020
- Installed: September 14, 2020
- Predecessor: Nelson J. Perez
- Previous post: Bishop of Greensburg (2015-2020)

Orders
- Ordination: May 30, 1987 by William Henry Keeler
- Consecration: July 13, 2015 by Charles J. Chaput

Personal details
- Born: August 14, 1960 (age 65) Harrisburg, Pennsylvania, US
- Education: Lebanon Valley College; Pontifical College Josephinum; Catholic University of America
- Motto: Serve the Lord with gladness

Styles of Edward Charles Malesic
- Reference style: His Excellency; The Most Reverend
- Spoken style: Your Excellency
- Religious style: Bishop

Edward Charles Malesic (born August 14, 1960) is an American prelate of the Catholic Church who serves as bishop of Cleveland in Ohio. He previously served as bishop of Greensburg in Pennsylvania from 2015 to 2020.

== Biography ==
=== Early life ===
Malesic was born on August 14, 1960, in Harrisburg, Pennsylvania, one of four children born to Joseph A. and Elizabeth Schatt Malesic. His paternal grandparents immigrated from the Bela Krajina region in Slovenia. He graduated from Central Dauphin East High School in Harrisburg in 1978.

Malesic majored in biology for three years at Lebanon Valley College. He entered the Pontifical College Josephinum in Columbus, Ohio, where he earned a bachelor's degree in philosophy in 1983 and Master of Divinity degree in 1987.

=== Priesthood ===
Malesic was ordained a priest by Bishop William Henry Keeler for the Diocese of Harrisburg on May 30, 1987. Malesic later received a Licentiate of Canon Law from the Catholic University of America in Washington, D.C.

After his ordination in 1987, the diocese assigned Malesic as assistant pastor at the following Pennsylvania parishes:

- St. Theresa in New Cumberland from 1987 to 1989
- St. Rose of Lima Parish in York from 1989 to 1992. Also in 1989, he was appointed campus minister at York College of Pennsylvania in Spring Garden Township

In 1992, Malesic left St. Rose to become campus minister at Millersville University of Pennsylvania in Millersville. The diocese transferred him from Millersville in 1996 to serve as an auditor in the ecclesiastical tribunal. Two years later, Bishop Nicholas C. Dattilo named Malesic as defender of the bond and canonical consulter for the tribunal.

Malesic became associated with the Newman Center at Messiah College in Mechanicsburg, Pennsylvania, from 2000 to 2004. The diocese in 2004 assigned him as first administrator and then pastor at Holy Infant Parish in York Haven, Pennsylvania. Malesic remained at Holy Infant until his consecration as bishop in 2015.

With his studies in canon law, Malesic served in various roles in the diocesan tribunal. They include auditor, adjutant judicial vicar, and secretary for canonical services. Bishop Kevin C. Rhoades appointed Malesic as judicial vicar and secretary of canonical services in 2006.

=== Bishop of Greensburg ===
Pope Francis named Malesic as bishop of Greensburg on April 24, 2015. He was consecrated in the Cathedral of the Blessed Sacrament in Greensburg on July 13, 2015, by Archbishop Charles J. Chaput, with Bishops Lawrence Eugene Brandt and Ronald William Gainer as co-consecrators.

On June 22, 2020, a man filed a lawsuit against Malesic, the Diocese of Greensburg, and Cardinal Donald Wuerl. The plaintiff said that Reverend Joseph L. Sredzinski, a priest in Fayette County, Pennsylvania, sexually abused him beginning in 1991, from age 11 to 17. Reports of the lawsuit did not explain Malesic's involvement.

=== Bishop of Cleveland ===
Pope Francis appointed Malesic as bishop of the Diocese of Cleveland on July 16, 2020. He was installed on September 14, 2020.

In 2023, Malesic issued new policies concerning LGBTQ Catholics, prohibiting all diocesan employees and students from undergoing gender-affirming surgery and using bathrooms or pronouns different than those affiliated with their sex as assigned at birth. The policies also require parents to be notified if their child is experiencing "gender dysphoria or gender confusion." This drew criticism from some parents, LGBTQ advocates, and elected officials, including Cleveland mayor Justin Bibb.

In 2025, Malesic expressed his support for a special message from the United States Conference of Catholic Bishops that criticized the mass deportation efforts during the second presidency of Donald Trump, recognizing the "pre-eminent dignity of every human being" and advocating for "responsible and reasonable immigration reform to fix a broken system."

== See also ==
- Catholic Church hierarchy
- Catholic Church in the United States
- Historical list of the Catholic bishops of the United States
- List of Catholic bishops of the United States
- Lists of patriarchs, archbishops, and bishops

Catholic Church titles
Preceded by Lawrence Eugene Brandt	Bishop of Greensburg; 2015–2020	Succeeded by Larry J. Kulick
Preceded by Nelson J. Perez	Bishop of Cleveland; 2020–present	Succeeded by Incumbent
