= Hugh Lamb =

Hugh Lamb may refer to:

- Hugh Lamb (c. 1850–1903), businessman with the architecture firm of Lamb and Rich
- Hugh L. Lamb (1890–1959), American prelate in the Catholic Church
