= Diocese of Greensburg =

Latin Catholic jurisdiction in the US

Diocese of Greensburg Dioecesis Greensburgensis

Catholic
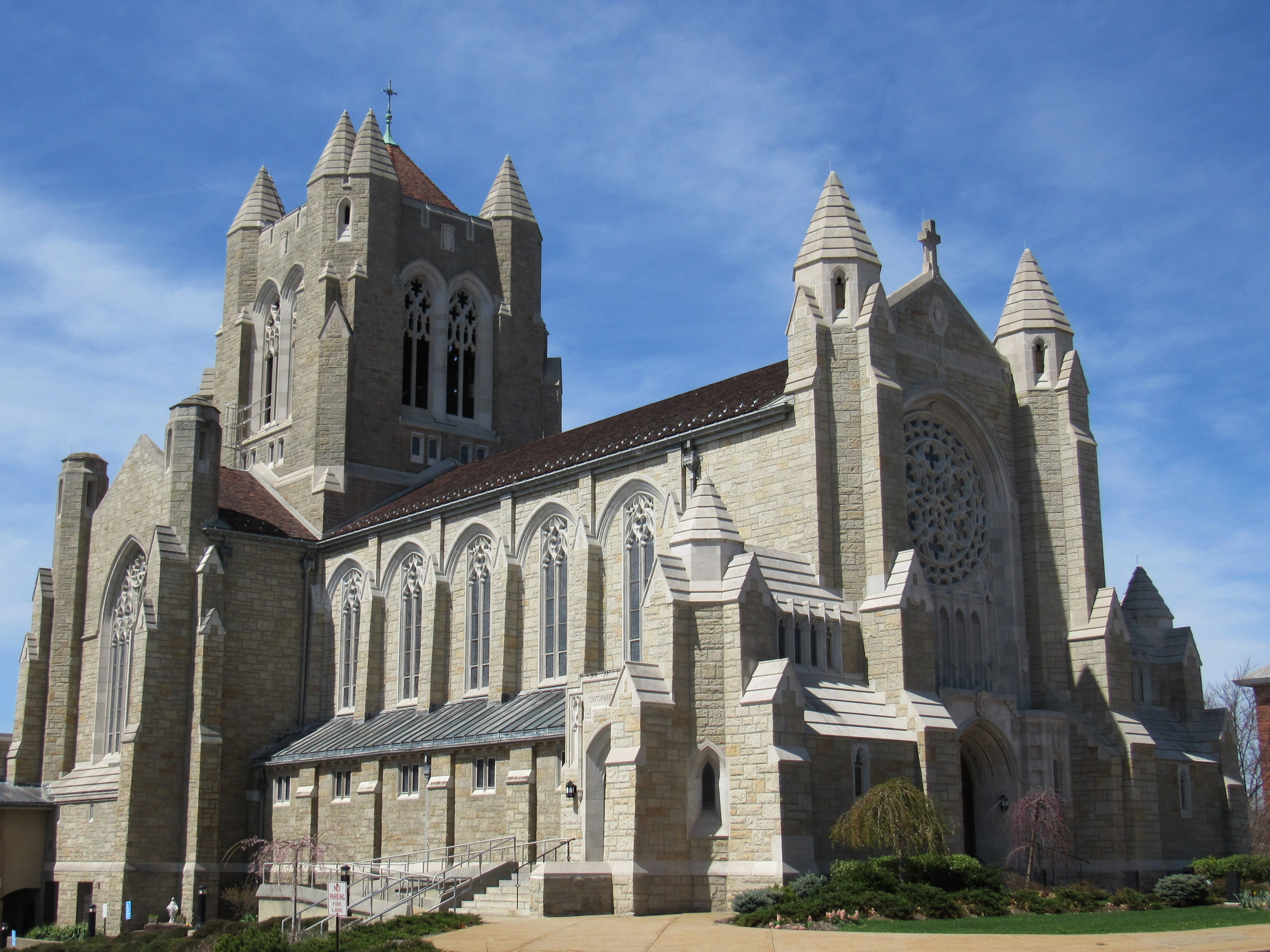
- Blessed Sacrament Cathedral

- Coat of arms

- Flag

Location
- Country: United States
- Territory: Armstrong, Fayette, Indiana, and Westmoreland counties in Western Pennsylvania
- Episcopal conference: United States Conference of Catholic Bishops
- Ecclesiastical region: Region III
- Ecclesiastical province: Province of Philadelphia
- Metropolitan: Archdiocese of Philadelphia

Statistics
- Area: 3,334 sq mi (8,640 km^{2})
- Population: Total; Catholics: (as of 2023); ▲667,700; 135,100 (▼20.2%)
- Parishes: 78 (2023)

Information
- Denomination: Catholic
- Sui iuris church: Latin Church
- Rite: Roman Rite
- Established: March 10, 1951 (75 years ago)
- Cathedral: Blessed Sacrament Cathedral
- Secular priests: ▼89 (diocesan) (2023); ▼141 (religious priests); ▼11 permanent deacons

Current leadership
- Pope: Leo XIV
- Bishop: Larry J. Kulick
- Metropolitan Archbishop: Nelson J. Perez

Map
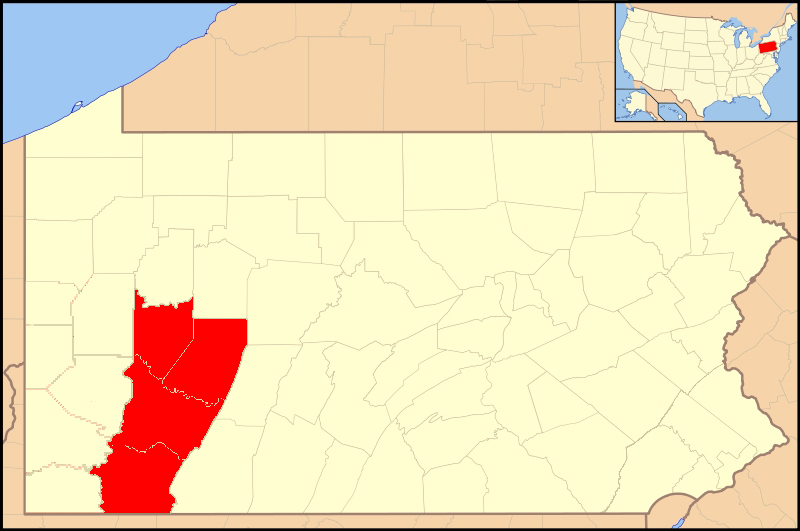

Website
- www.dioceseofgreensburg.org

The Diocese of Greensburg (Latin: Dioecesis Greensburgensis) is a diocese of the Catholic Church in western Pennsylvania in the United States. Erected in 1951, it is a suffragan diocese in the ecclesiastical province of the metropolitan Archdiocese of Philadelphia. The mother church is Blessed Sacrament Cathedral in Greensburg. The bishop is Larry J. Kulick.

== Territory ==
The Diocese of Greensburg is centered in Greensburg, with parishes in Armstrong, Fayette, Indiana, and Westmoreland counties.

== History ==
=== 1700 to 1800 ===
Unlike the other British colonies in America, the Province of Pennsylvania did not ban Catholics from the colony or threaten priests with imprisonment. However, the colony did require any Catholics seeing public office to take an oath to Protestantism.

In 1784, a year after the end of the American Revolution, Pope Pius VI erected the Apostolic Prefecture of United States of America, including all of the new United States. In 1789, Pius VI converted the prefecture to the Diocese of Baltimore, covering all of the United States. With the passage of the US Bill of Rights in 1791, Catholics received full freedom of worship. That same year, a small group of Catholic families bought property in Greensburg for the first Catholic church in the city.

In 1790, Theodore Brouwers purchased land near present-day Latrobe to create the first parish in Pennsylvania west of the Allegheny Mountains. It was initially called Sportsman's Hall Parish after the name of the land tract, but was soon renamed as Saint Vincent parish.

=== 1800 to 1950 ===
In 1808, Pope Pius VII erected the Diocese of Philadelphia, covering all of Pennsylvania. As the Catholic population grew in Pennsylvania in the 19th century, the Vatican erected the Diocese of Pittsburgh in 1843 to cover the western part of the state. The Greenburg region remained part of the Diocese of Pittsburgh for the next 108 years.

In 1846, Saint Vincent Archabbey was established in Latrobe, making it the first Benedictine monastery in the United States. In 1847, the first Catholic Church in Greensburg was established by the missionary John Nepomucene Neumann. It was the forerunner of Blessed Sacrament Cathedral. That same year, The Sisters of Mercy established St. Xavier Academy in Latrobe.

=== 1950 to 1980 ===
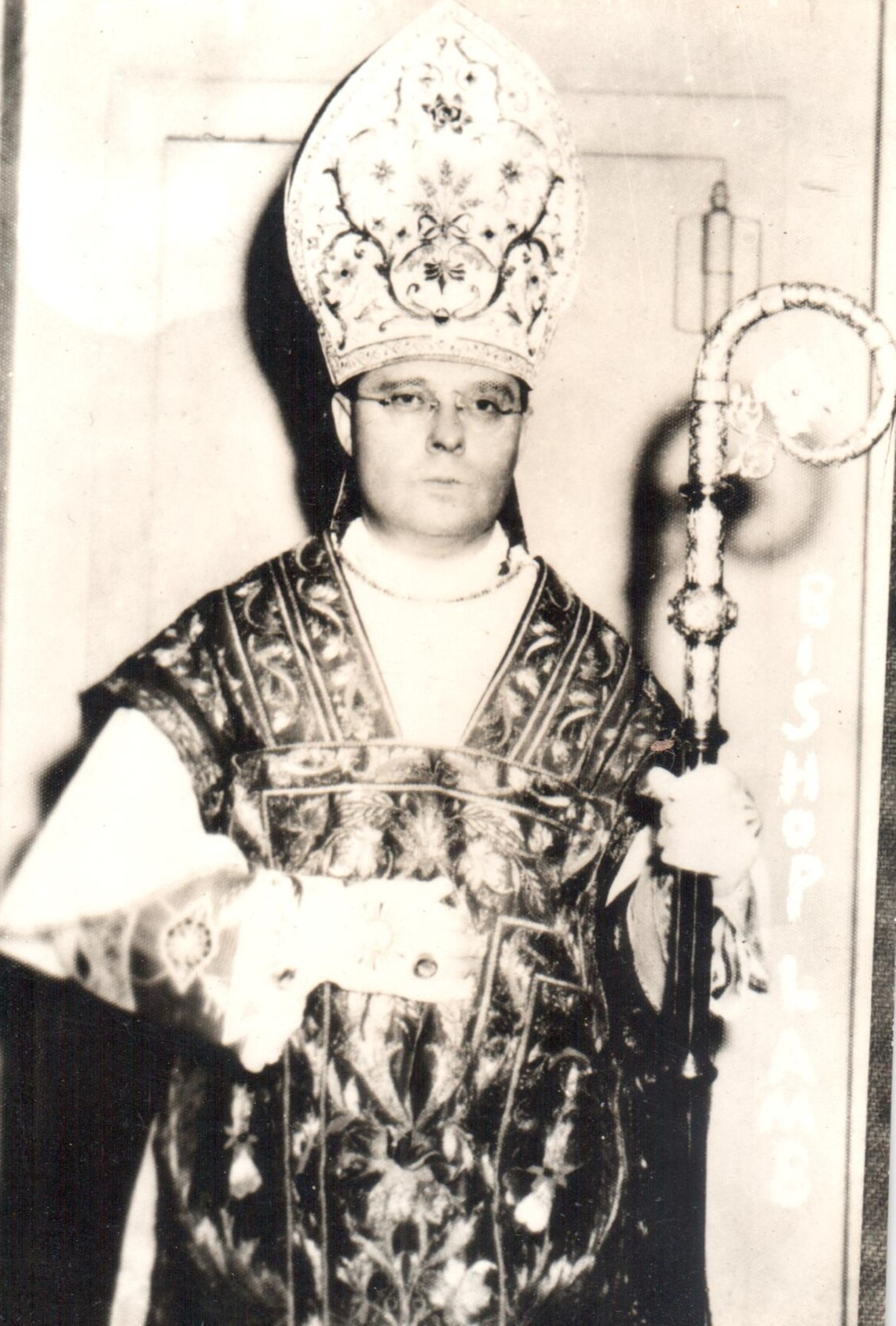
Bishop Lamb (pre-1959)

On May 28, 1951, Pope Pius XII erected the Diocese of Greensburg, taking its territory from the Diocese of Pittsburgh. The pope named Auxiliary Bishop Hugh L. Lamb of Philadelphia as the first bishop of Greensburg. Under Lamb's direction, the diocese spent nearly $6.5 million on construction or additions to existing facilities. Eight new schools, including Greensburg Central Catholic High School, were created and ten new parishes were established. Lamb helped found Jeannette District Memorial Hospital in Greensburg, donating over $300,000 for its construction and securing the Sisters of Charity of Seton Hill to staff it. Lamb died in 1959.

The second bishop of Greensburg was William G. Connare of Pittsburgh, named by Pope John XXIII in 1960. He founded the diocesan newspaper, The Catholic Accent, in 1961 and presided over the first diocesan synod that same year. He also expanded educational programs in parishes and opened the diocesan office of Catholic Charities. Connare said that his greatest accomplishment was the renovation of Blessed Sacrament Cathedral in 1972 to accommodate the liturgical reforms from the Second Vatican Council.

=== 1980 to present ===
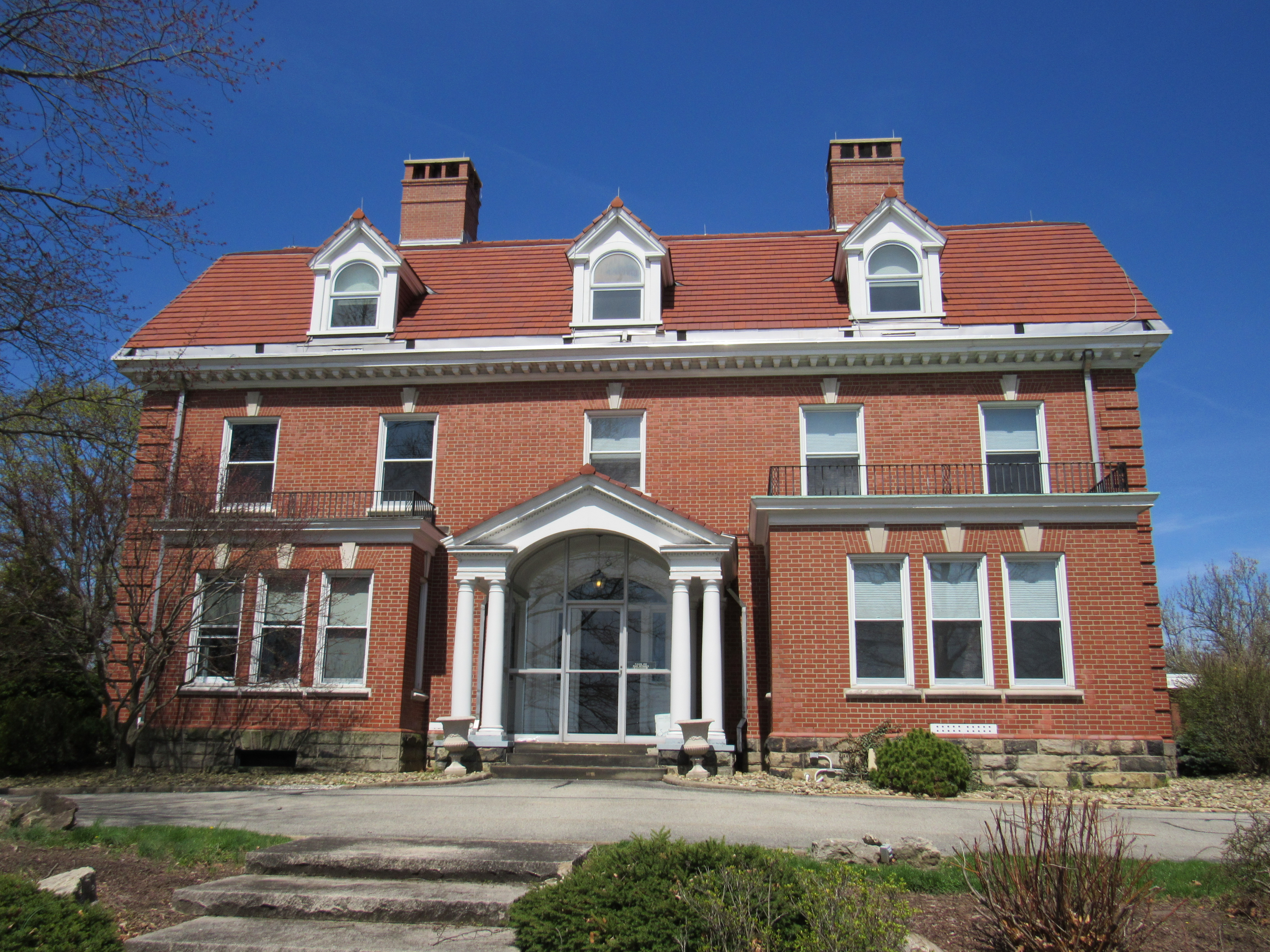
Diocesan Pastoral Center, Greensburg, Pennsylvania (2017)

The diocese received complaints in May 1981 that Roger Sinclair had sexually abused two boys in 1980. Although the diocese reported the priest to local police, no action was taken until June 1981, when Bishop Connare sent him to therapy. In 1984, the diocese gave Sinclair a good recommendation to join the US Air Force Chaplain Corps. In 1991, Topeka State Hospital in Topeka, Kansas, fired Sinclair for attempting to take young male patients on an unauthorized outing. After an abuse allegation appeared in 2002, the Diocese of Greensburg removed Sinclair's ministerial privileges and he was laicized.

Connare retired in 1987 after 27 years as bishop. His replacement that same year was Auxiliary Bishop Anthony G. Bosco. Bosco changed diocese policy on sacraments to combine the sacrament of confirmation and the first eucharist for children on the same day. He created the diocesan Department of Education and Spiritual Formation. Bosco retired in 2004.

In 2004, John Paul II appointed Monsignor Lawrence Brandt from the Diocese of Erie as the fourth bishop of the Diocese of Greensburg. In 2010, Brandt established the Diocesan Poverty Relief Fund for direct aid to the poor in the diocese. In 2014, Brandt sued the U.S. Department of Health and Human Service over a provision in the Affordable Care Act that required certain religious institutions to provide contraceptive coverage in employer health insurance plans. The suit characterized this provision as an infringement on religious liberty. Brandt retired in 2015.

Edward C. Malesic was named as the next bishop of Greensburg in 2015. In July 2018, John T. Sweeney, a diocesan priest, pleaded guilty to abusing a fourth grade boy between September 1991 and June 1992. Immediately following Sweeney's plea, the diocese made a statement pledging future cooperation, agreeing to continue educating both children and adults in the Diocese of Greensburg on issues of abuse. The diocese also agreed to report any alleged incident of sexual abuse to the "PA Childline and the appropriate district attorney." In December 2018, Sweeney received a sentence of up to five years in prison. In August 2018, Bishop Malesic acknowledged numerous reports of sex abuse of children between the 1950s and 1980s, and announced that the diocese would release the names of the accused clergy when the grand jury report was published. The Pennsylvania grand jury report, published in August 2018, showed that 20 diocesan clergy had credible accusations of sexual abuse. In early 2016, Pennsylvania Attorney General Josh Shapiro convened a special grand jury investigation into sexual abuse of children by clergy in six Pennsylvania dioceses, including the Diocese of Greensburg. According to The Philadelphia Inquirer, in 2017 the Dioceses of Harrisburg and Greensburg attempted to shut down the grand jury investigation.

On July 1, 2020, Malesic announced the Saint Pope John Paul II Tuition Opportunity Partnership (TOP) to provide $4.1 million in scholarships and tuition assistance to Catholic schools in the diocese. In 2020, he was appointed bishop of the Diocese of Cleveland. In August 2020, Malesic announced that the diocese found credible sexual abuse allegations against Emil Payer. The statute of limitations prevented authorities from filing criminal sexual abuse charges against Payer.

As of 2023, the bishop of Greensburg is Larry J. Kulick from Greensburg, named by Pope Francis in 2021.

== Bishops ==
=== Bishops of Greensburg ===
1. Hugh L. Lamb (1951–1960)
2. William G. Connare (1960–1987)
3. Anthony G. Bosco (1987–2004)
4. Lawrence E. Brandt (2004–2015)
5. Edward C. Malesic (2015–2020), appointed Bishop of Cleveland.
6. Larry J. Kulick (2021–present)

=== Former auxiliary bishop ===
Norbert F. Gaughan (1975–1984), appointed Bishop of Gary

=== Other diocesan priests who became bishops ===
- Cyril John Vogel, appointed Bishop of Salina in 1965
- Giuseppe De Andrea, appointed Apostolic Nuncio and Titular Archbishop in 2001 and later Assessor of the Order of the Holy Sepulchre
- Lawrence T. Persico, appointed Bishop of Erie in 2012

== Parishes ==
As of 2025, the Diocese of Greensburg was serving 135,000 Catholics in 77 parishes (some of them partnered) in seven deaneries. A diocesan strategic planning process began in 2006 resulted in closures of parishes and chapels, as well as partnering of parishes that have remained open. The last of these changes occurred in 2013.

== Schools ==
As of 2025, the Diocese of Greensburg has 15 schools.

=== Diocesan schools ===
==== High schools ====
As of 2025, the diocese operates two high schools:

- Geibel Catholic Junior-Senior High School – Connellsville Township. It serves the southern half of the diocesan territory. The diocese introduced a middle school in 2007, bringing the grade levels to 7–12.
- Greensburg Central Catholic Junior-Senior High School – Hempfield Township. It serves the central and northern sections of the diocese. This school serves grades 7–12.
