= William G. Connare =

American Catholic prelate (1911–1995)

His Excellency, The Most Reverend William Graham Connare
- Bishop of Greensburg
- See: Diocese of Greensburg
- In office: February 23, 1960 – January 20, 1987
- Predecessor: Hugh L. Lamb
- Successor: Anthony G. Bosco

Orders
- Ordination: June 14, 1936 by Hugh Charles Boyle
- Consecration: May 4, 1960 by Egidio Vagnozzi

Personal details
- Born: December 11, 1911 Pittsburgh, Pennsylvania, US
- Died: June 12, 1995 (aged 83) Greensburg, Pennsylvania, US
- Education: Duquesne University; Saint Vincent College
- Motto: Sicut qui ministrat (As one who serves)

William Graham Connare (December 11, 1911 – June 12, 1995) was an American Catholic prelate who served as bishop of Greensburg in Pennsylvania from 1960 to 1987.

== Biography ==
=== Early life ===
William Connare was born on December 11, 1911, in the East End of Pittsburgh, Pennsylvania, one of three children of James J. and Nellie T. (O'Connor) Connare. His parents were Irish immigrants who immigrated to the United States from County Galway and County Kerry, respectively. James Connare worked as an engineer for Nabisco. William Connare was a first cousin once removed of Mother Mercedes O'Connor, who was the first sister recruited by Katherine Drexel into the order of the Sisters of the Blessed Sacrament and the first successor to Drexel. Connare remained very close to the Sisters of the Blessed Sacrament throughout his life.

In 1917, Connare enrolled at the newly opened St. Lawrence School in Pittsburgh. After graduating from Duquesne University Preparatory School, he studied at Duquesne University in Pittsburgh. He graduated from Duquesne in 1932, and then attended St. Vincent College in Latrobe, Pennsylvania, where he earned a Master's degree in 1934. He began his studies for the priesthood at St. Vincent Seminary in Latrobe.

=== Priesthood ===
Connare was ordained a priest for the Diocese of Pittsburgh by Bishop Hugh C. Boyle at Saint Vincent Basilica in Latrobe on June 14, 1936. After his ordination, the diocese assigned Connare as a curate at St. Canice Parish in Pittsburgh. He was transferred to the Cathedral of St. Paul in Pittsburgh in 1937, where he remained for 12 years. In 1949, Connare was appointed administrator of St. Richard Parish, an African American parish in the Hill District of Pittsburgh. He became both pastor of St. Richard's in 1955; that same year, the Vatican elevated Connare to the rank of domestic prelate.

At St. Richard's, Connare helped organize the Catholic Interracial Council of Pittsburgh in 1953. He was also a board member of the Urban League of Pittsburgh and the Pittsburgh branch of the National Association for the Advancement of Colored People (NAACP). In addition to his pastoral duties, Connare served as diocesan director of the Society for the Propagation of the Faith and as vicar for religious.

=== Bishop of Greensburg ===
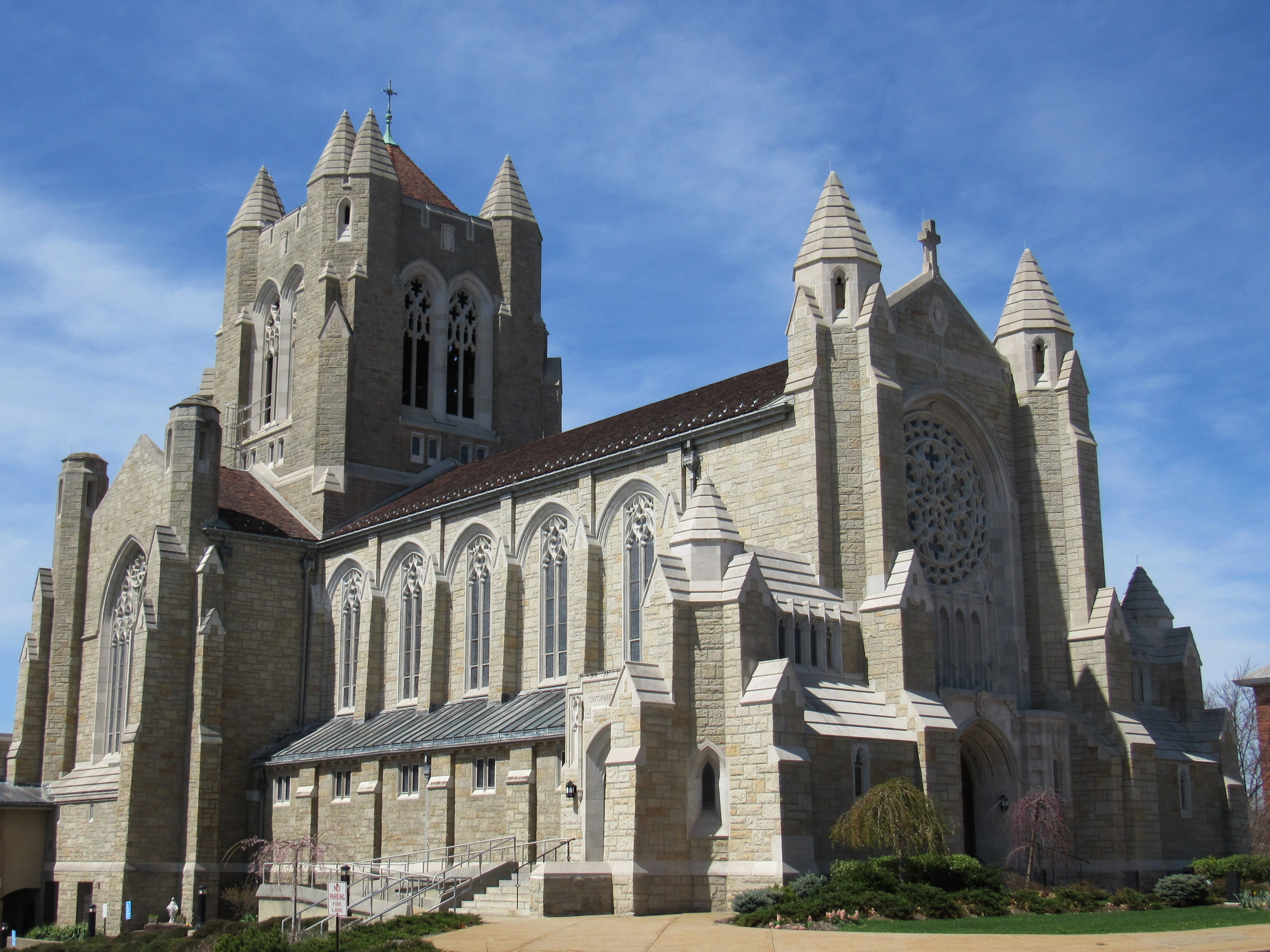
Cathedral of the Blessed Sacrament, Greensburg, Pennsylvania (2017)

On February 23, 1960, Connare was appointed the second bishop of Greensburg by Pope John XXIII. He received his episcopal consecration on May 4, 1960, from Archbishop Egidio Vagnozzi, with Archbishop John F. Dearden and Bishop Richard H. Ackerman serving as co-consecrators, at the Cathedral of the Blessed Sacrament in Greensburg. Connare founded the diocesan newspaper, The Catholic Accent, in 1961 and presided over the first diocesan synod that same year. He also expanded educational programs in parishes and opened the diocesan office of Catholic Charities.

Between 1962 and 1965, Connare attended all four sessions of the Second Vatican Council in Rome. He addressed the council on behalf of the American bishops on the subject of the Divine Office and breviary. Shortly before the close of the council, he reorganized the diocesan liturgical commission and established committees to facilitate such reforms as the change of the language of mass from Latin to English. His self-proclaimed greatest accomplishment was the renovation of Blessed Sacrament in 1972 to accommodate the new liturgical reforms.

In 1980, Connare attended the funeral of Archbishop Óscar Romero in San Salvador, who had been assassinated at a chapel there. He also served as episcopal moderator of the National Catholic Committee on Scouting from 1961 to 1970 and was awarded the Silver Buffalo Award by the Boy Scouts of America in 1971.

=== Retirement and legacy ===
After Connare reached the mandatory retirement age of 75, Pope John Paul II accepted his resignation as bishop of Greensburg on January 20, 1987. Connare served as apostolic administrator of the diocese until the installation of his successor, Bishop Anthony G. Bosco, on June 30, 1987.

William Connare died at Westmoreland Regional Hospital in Greensburg as a result of complications from anemia on July 12, 1995, at age 83. In August 2018, a Pennsylvania grand jury revealed numerous reports of clerical sex abuse of minors in the diocese during Connare's tenure as bishop.

Catholic Church titles
Preceded by Hugh L. Lamb	Bishop of Greensburg; 1960–1987	Succeeded by Anthony G. Bosco
