= Lawrence Eugene Brandt =

American Roman Catholic prelate (1939–2025)

His Excellency, The Most Reverend Lawrence Eugene Brandt
- Bishop of Greensburg
- Church: Catholic Church
- Archdiocese: Philadelphia
- Diocese: Greensburg
- Appointed: January 2, 2004
- Installed: March 4, 2004
- Retired: April 24, 2015
- Predecessor: Anthony G. Bosco
- Successor: Edward C. Malesic

Orders
- Ordination: December 19, 1969 by James Aloysius Hickey
- Consecration: March 4, 2004 by Justin Francis Cardinal Rigali, Anthony G. Bosco, and Donald Walter Trautman

Personal details
- Born: March 27, 1939 Charleston, West Virginia, U.S.
- Died: June 8, 2025 (aged 86)
- Education: Pontifical College Josephinum; University of Innsbruck; Pontifical Gregorian University; Pontifical Ecclesiastical Academy
- Motto: Ignis caritatis (The fire of charity)

Styles of Lawrence Eugene Brandt
- Reference style: His Excellency; The Most Reverend
- Spoken style: Your Excellency
- Religious style: Bishop

Lawrence Eugene Brandt (March 27, 1939 – June 8, 2025) was an American Catholic prelate who served as bishop of Greensburg in Pennsylvania from 2004 to 2015.

== Biography ==
=== Early life ===
Lawrence Brandt was born on March 27, 1939, in Charleston, West Virginia, the son of Lawrence E. and Priscilla (Purdy) Brandt. As a child, Brandt would pretend to celebrate the mass using a small workbench as an altar, Necco Wafers as hosts, and one of his father's architectural manuals as the lectionary. The family later moved to Lake City, Pennsylvania, where Brandt attended St. John the Evangelist School in Girard, Pennsylvania.

Deciding to become a priest, Brandt then studied at the Pontifical College Josephinum in Columbus, Ohio, for high school and college courses. Brandt travelled to Innsbruck, Austria, to study at the University of Innsbruck, obtaining his Doctor of Philosophy degree in 1966. He completed his theological studies at the Pontifical North American College and Pontifical Gregorian University in Rome.

=== Priesthood ===
Brandt was ordained to the priesthood by Cardinal James Aloysius Hickey for the Diocese of Erie on December 19, 1969, in St. Peter's Basilica in Rome. Brandt then attended the Pontifical Ecclesiastical Academy and entered the Vatican Diplomatic Service in 1973, serving in Madagascar, Germany, Ecuador, and Algeria. In 1974, Pope Paul VI named Brandt as chaplain of his holiness with the title of monsignor.

In 1981, Brandt left the diplomatic service for family reasons and returned to Pennsylvania. He went back to Rome in 1983 to obtain his Doctor of Canon Law degree from the Pontifical Lateran University, audited by Cardinal Tarcisio Bertone. Brandt also studied at the University of Paris in France and the University of Florence in Italy.

In 1984, Brandt was incardinated into the Diocese of Erie, where he served as vice-chancellor. In 1985, he was appointed assistant chancellor and resident chaplain of Gannondale Residential Center for Girls, a residential facility in Erie for victims of violence and abuse. In 1991, the Vatican named Brandt an honorary prelate of his holiness. In 1998, he left Gannondale to become pastor of St. Hedwig Parish in Erie. He later served as pastor at Christ the King Parish in Dunbar, West Virginia, and Sacred Heart Parish in Charleston, West Virginia.

=== Bishop of Greensburg ===
On January 2, 2004, Pope John Paul II appointed Brandt as the fourth bishop of Greensburg. He received his episcopal consecration at Blessed Sacrament Cathedral in Greensburg on March 4, 2004, from Cardinal Justin Rigali, with Bishops Anthony Bosco and Donald Trautman serving as co-consecrators. In 2010, Brandt established the diocesan Poverty Relief Fund for direct aid to the poor.

On June 3, 2014, Brandt and the diocese sued the U.S. Department of Health and Human Service over a provision in the 2010 Affordable Care Act that required certain religious institutions to provide contraceptive coverage in employer health insurance plans. The suit characterized this provision as an infringement on religious liberty.

=== Retirement ===
On April 24, 2015, Pope Francis accepted Brandt's letter of resignation as bishop of Greensburg, to be replaced by Reverend Edward Malesic.

On October 10, 2019, Brandt and the diocese were sued by a woman who had alleged that she had been raped beginning at age 12 in 1972 by Reverend George Pierce, her parish priest. The suit claimed that Brandt and the diocese conspired to protect Pierce. In 2004, Brandt had sent a request to Cardinal Josef Ratzinger, head of the Congregation for the Doctrine of the Faith in Rome, to defrock Pierce.

=== Death ===
On June 8, 2025, Brandt died at the age of 86.

== See also ==
- Catholic Church hierarchy
- Catholic Church in the United States
- Historical list of the Catholic bishops of the United States
- List of Catholic bishops of the United States
- Lists of patriarchs, archbishops, and bishops

== Episcopal succession ==
Catholic Church titles
Preceded by Anthony G. Bosco	Bishop of Greensburg; 2004–2015	Succeeded by Edward C. Malesic
