= Geibel Catholic High School =

Geibel Catholic Junior-Senior High School
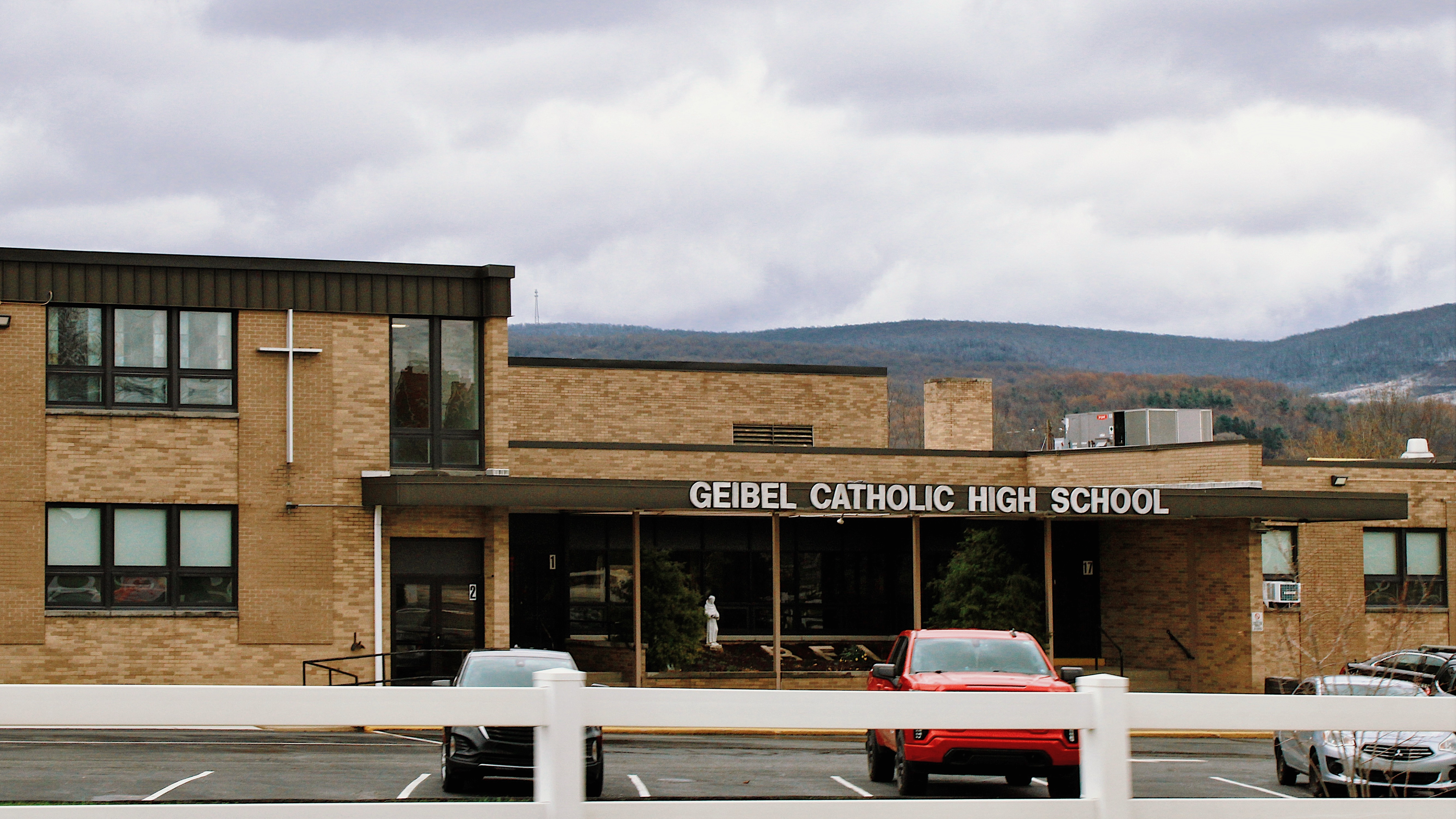

Location
- 611 East Crawford Avenue; Connellsville, (Fayette County), Pennsylvania 15425; United States; 40°1′35″N 79°34′47″W

Information
- Former name: Father Geibel Memorial High School
- School type: Private, junior/senior high school
- Religious affiliation: Roman Catholic
- Established: 1964; 62 years ago
- Principal: Robert Fetter
- Chaplain: Fr. Dan Carr
- Teaching staff: 12.0 (FTE) (2017–18)
- Grades: 7–12
- Gender: Co-educational
- Enrollment: 170 (2017–18)
- Student to teacher ratio: 14.2∶1 (2017–18)
- Colors: Green, White, Gold
- Mascot: Gator
- Team name: Gators
- Accreditation: Middle States Association of Colleges and Schools
- Yearbook: Geibel Galaxy
- Website: geibelcatholic.org

Geibel Catholic Junior-Senior High School is a private, Roman Catholic high school in Connellsville, Pennsylvania. It is located in the Roman Catholic Diocese of Greensburg.

== History ==
In 1959, Bishop William G. Connare began to develop plans to build a new, modern high school that would serve students from Northern Fayette and South-Central Westmoreland Counties. The Rev. Henry Geibel, former priest of the nearby Immaculate Conception Roman Catholic Parish, where classes were held previously, until the school enrollment over-exceeded its capacity, purchased property on which the school would be built in the Hillcrest section of Connellsville Township. Ground was broken on March 6, 1963. The facility cost $1.2 Million to construct and was completed for the start of classes in the winter of 1964. Rev. Geibel died before the school was completed. The school was named in his honor, the Father Geibel Memorial High School. A football field was added in 2004. The Middle School Concept, adding grades 7 and 8, was completed for the start of the 2006–07 school term. The current school name is Geibel Catholic Middle-High School.

== Sports ==
Geibel Catholic is well known statewide for their basketball program, led for 45 years by Coach Ken Misiak. Geibel went on to an undefeated season in 1978, winning the single A State Championship that year. Geibel Catholic won two WPIAL championships in 1978, and 1981. And has over 20 divisional championships during Misiak's tenure. Geibel has had much success with their girls volleyball team, winning section several years in a row, with their most recent being in 2019. Geibel has also had much success with their golf program, which won the divisional title 4 years in a row (2004–07) under three different head coaches and reaching the WPIAL finals in 2007. The golf team also had a great deal of success in the early 1990s, winning the WPIAL Championship in 1994 under coach John MacFarland. The Geibel football team has a 13–87 record over the past 10 years, one of the highest numbers of losses in the WPIAL during that period. Geibel's football team used to hold the record for the longest losing streak in PIAA history of 38 games. In 2011, Geibel's hockey program made its presence known by becoming the champions of the Pennsylvania Interscholastic Roller Hockey League. Bob Bailor played in MLB and also went to Geibel.

=== Sports Played at GCHS ===
Geibel is in the Pennsylvania Interscholastic Athletic Association District 7 (WPIAL)

Sport	Men	Women
Baseball/Softball	Class A	Class A
Basketball	Class A	Class A
Cross Country	Class AA	Class AA
Golf	Class AAAA	
Soccer	Class A	Class A
Track and Field	Class AAAA	Class AAAA
Volleyball		Class A

== Notable alumni ==
- Gregory Russell Director of Technology, The John Carroll School
