= Cardinal O'Connor Conference on Life =

Student-run pro-life conference at Georgetown University

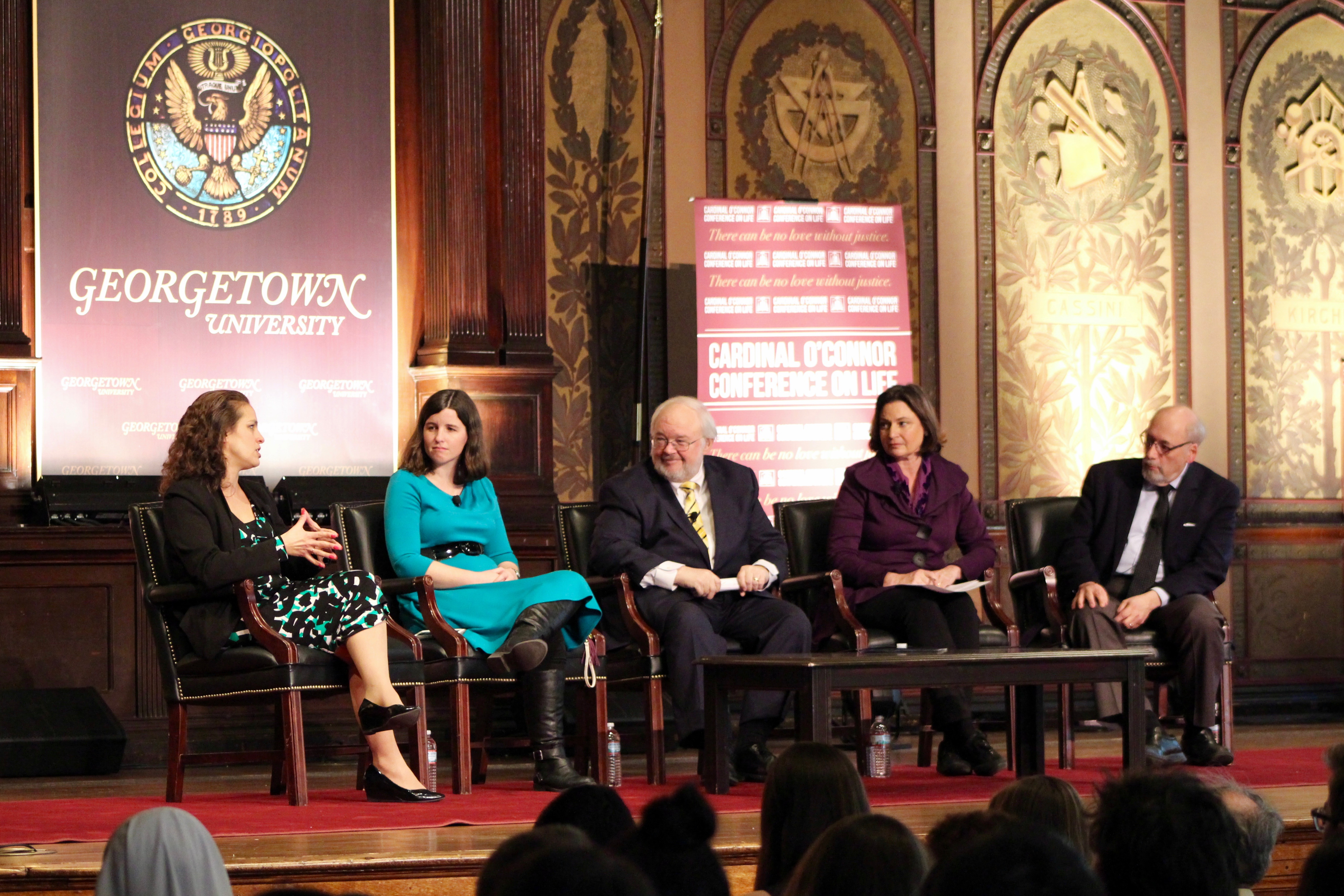
- Panel at OCC 2018
- Formation: 2000
- Founder: Stephen Feiler
- Purpose: Pro-life academia
- Co-Directors: Jack Daly, Craig Bowman, Sophie Sagastume
- Website: www.oconnorconference.com

The Cardinal O'Connor Conference on Life, also known simply as the O'Connor Conference (OCC), is the largest student-run Anti-abortion conference in the United States. The conference was founded by Georgetown University undergraduate students in 2000 and subsequently named in honor of the late Archbishop of New York, Cardinal John Joseph O'Connor, who earned a PhD from Georgetown University and was an outspoken critic of abortion.

The Conference is run entirely by Georgetown students each year on the day after the annual March for Life in Washington, D.C. in late January. Organizers describe the conference as based on Catholic teaching and say the event "strives to promote intellectually rigorous discourse on the sanctity of human life as well as build a culture of life both within and beyond the Georgetown community." Conference speakers primarily voice opposition to abortion, but they have also discussed other issues of human dignity such as adoption, capital punishment, war, immigration, and racism.

== History ==
The first conference, then named the College Student Conference on Life, was held in January 2000 in Gaston Hall. It featured two keynote speakers: Helen Alvaré, Esq. and Georgetown alumnus Representative Henry Hyde of Illinois, after whom the Hyde Amendment is named. On May 3, 2000, John Cardinal O’Connor of New York died, and the student leaders subsequently elected to name the Conference in his honor as he was himself an alumnus of Georgetown and one of the most renowned contemporary voices defending unborn human life. In 2001, the Cardinal O’Connor Conference on Life brought together over 400 college-aged students to listen to keynote addresses and participate in discussion groups. Originally created for college and high school students, the Conference now attracts students, academics, clergy, and activists from around the country to reflect on and engage with the plethora of social and political issues surrounding the dignity of human life.

In 2006, one of the two keynote speakers was Mother Agnes Mary Donovan, S.V., the first Superior General of the Sisters of Life. The Sisters of Life is a Catholic female religious order dedicated to protecting and enhancing the sacredness of human life. The order was originally conceived of by Cardinal O’Connor, and its presence at and support of the Cardinal O’Conner Conference on Life have been a staple feature of the Conference ever since.

The Conference established the Evangelium Vitae Award in 2006 to annually recognize and reward one outstanding collegiate pro-life student organization for the work it has done over the previous year. The winning student group is announced at the Conference and, along with the award, receives a $1,000 gift to further advance its work. The award was renamed in honor of Rev. Fr. Thomas M. King, S.J., who co-founded University Faculty for Life and served as its president for fifteen years, after he died in 2009.

In 2011, the student co-directors began designating a theme for each year’s conference, and the first such theme was “Building a Culture of Life Today: Learning from the Life and Legacy of Cardinal O’Connor.” In many of the subsequent years, a breakout session has been given on this topic by members of the Sisters of Life to educate attendees on the Conference’s namesake. Other conference themes throughout the years have drawn attention to anti-abortion legislation, women leaders in the anti-abortion movement, the intersection of morality and law, polarized political partisanship, and the growth of secularism.

The Conference has grown to host many prominent anti-abortion speakers, including Lila Rose, Jeanne Mancini, Raymond Cardinal Burke, Sean Cardinal O'Malley, Dr. Mildred Jefferson, Dr. Alveda King, and Serrin Foster. In 2019, the Conference celebrated its twentieth anniversary and featured a keynote address by Timothy Cardinal Dolan of New York, Cardinal O’Connor’s successor. Gloria Purvis, a Black Catholic and talk show host, spoke at the 2020 conference on the anti-abortion movement engaging with African Americans.

Due to the COVID-19 pandemic, the Conference was held virtually in 2021 and 2022, returning to an in-person format in 2023. In 2021, an Advisory Board consisting of select Georgetown administrators, faculty, and alumni was formed to be a formal resource and communication channel for the student leaders serving on the Conference Board.

January 2024 marked the 25th year of the Conference, with the theme being "Discerning the Next 25 Years.” The Keynote Address was given by His Eminence Seán Patrick O’Malley, O.F.M. Cap. The panelists were Sr. Mariae Agnus Dei, SV (Sisters of Life, St. Clare’s Convent, D.C.), Kristen Day (Executive Director, Democrats for Life of America), Emily Geiger (Director of Education & Outreach at Equal Rights Institute), and Margaret Hartshorn, Ph.D. (Board Chair, Heartbeat International). The panel moderator was Kim Daniels, J.D. (Director of the Initiative on Catholic Social Thought and Public Life). The Conference invited Lila Rose back in January 2025, and hosted several international speakers to correspond with the theme "Life and Dignity: A Global Commitment." This included a panel focused on the international prolife movement, including Melissa Ohden (The Abortion Survivors Network), Brian Clowes, PhD (Human Life International), Jor-El Godsey (Heartbeat International), Maria Paula Andana (SOS Ministries), and Abigail Galván (EWTN Pro-life Weekly).

== Format & Sponsorship ==
Originally, the Cardinal O’Connor Conference was held the day before the annual March for Life and consisted of a series of addresses given by keynote speakers followed by discussion groups for the attendees to participate in. These discussion groups offered participants an opportunity to network with one another and share ideas and experiences from their respective collegiate anti-abortion student groups. In 2004, the Conference replaced the discussion group component with a series of breakout sessions featuring individual speakers presenting to smaller audiences of attendees. These breakout sessions are held concurrently and offer attendees a wide variety of specific topics to choose from and learn more about.

In 2008, a special Mass for Life was celebrated by Donald Wuerl, archbishop of Washington, D.C., the evening before the Conference. The Mass was followed by a fundraising event called “The Luau for Life” for the benefit of the Northwest Pregnancy Center, a local crisis pregnancy center founded by Georgetown alumni. In later years, this fundraiser was rebranded and continued as a dinner known as the “Banquet for Life.” The Mass for Life continues to be celebrated every year at the conclusion of the Conference in Dahlgren Chapel of the Sacred Heart, typically by a bishop or cardinal, and the Jesuits of Georgetown.

Up until 2010, the Conference generally included two keynote addresses. Beginning in 2011, the second keynote was replaced with a panel discussion that focused on that year’s particular theme. Thus, the Conference’s schedule began to take its modern shape, consisting of opening remarks from co-directors, a keynote address, concurrent breakout sessions, a panel discussion, closing remarks, and a Mass for Life.

The conference is sponsored by a diversity of anti-abortion organizations.
