= Ernest Varacalli =

American mobster

Ernest Varacalli, "Junior"
- Born: March 23, 1943 (age 83); Brooklyn, New York, U.S.

Ernest Varacalli (born March 23, 1944), or "Junior", is a New York mobster who belongs to the Genovese crime family, one of the five New York crime families. Varacalli has used as many as nine different aliases during his criminal career.

== Car theft ring ==
In May 2001, the Federal Bureau of Investigation (FBI), in conjunction with the Brooklyn District Attorney's office, arrested Varacalli for insurance fraud, extortion, and other charges. Varacalli was the alleged ring leader of the biggest stolen car empire in New York City. New York Police Commissioner Bernard B. Kerik said that Varacalli made more than $10.5 million a year stealing cars to order and dispatching thieves to steal air bags from specific cars, based on orders from auto parts shops around the city. Some of those cars were "stolen" with the consent of their owners who wanted to get out of lease payments. Varacalli's crew was responsible for the theft of about 600 auto airbags.

In 2002, Varacalli was sentenced to 10 years in prison and received a $1 million fine. He was incarcerated at the Federal Correctional Institution (FCI) in Otisville, New York. On December 21, 2009 Varacalli was released from prison.

== Mob wife ==
Camille Colucci, Varacalli's third wife, was also accused of falsifying business documents in connection with the stolen car ring. She pleaded guilty and was fined $400,000.

During the 1970s, Colucci became the center of a messy Mafia "love triangle." Thomas Spero, the nephew of a Mafia Capo, was infatuated with Colucci, but she was already married (not to Varacalli then), but to a mob associate named Joseph Colucci. According to Gambino family turncoat "Sammy the Bull" Gravano, Spero's uncle, Thomas "Shorty" Spero², arranged for him to kill Camille's husband. Gravano told the FBI this was his first hit. "I shot him twice in the head," Gravano said, "Then three more times when his body was dumped out of the car on Rockaway Parkway, (a street in Canarsie, Brooklyn)." Once Colucci became a widow, she married the younger Spero.
