= Anthony G. Bosco =

American prelate (1927–2013)

His Excellency, The Most Reverend Anthony G. Bosco
- Bishop of Greensburg; Titular Bishop of Labicum
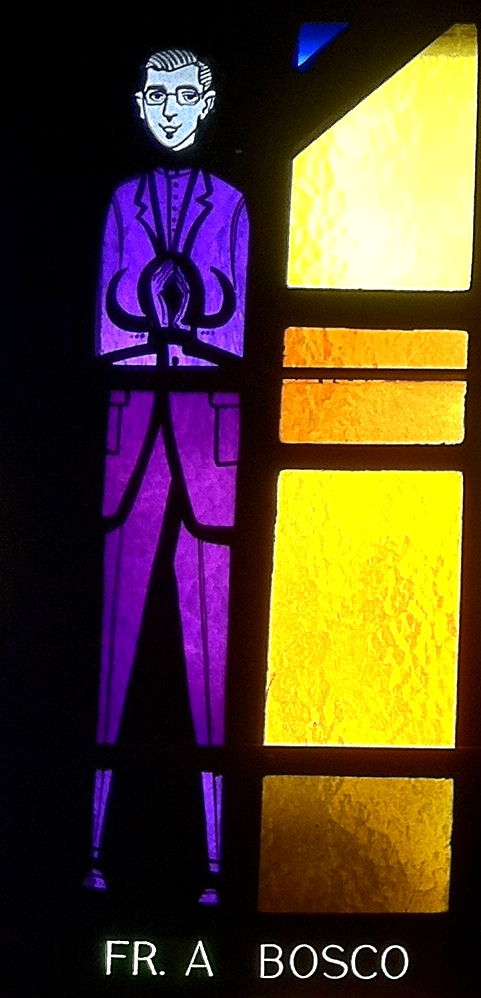
- Stained-glass of Bishop Bosco in Saint Patrick Church in Canonsburg, Pennsylvania
- See: Diocese of Greensburg
- Predecessor: William G. Connare
- Successor: Lawrence Eugene Brandt
- Other posts: Auxiliary Bishop of Pittsburgh (1970–1987)

Orders
- Ordination: June 7, 1952 by John Francis Dearden
- Consecration: June 30, 1970 by John J. Wright, Vincent Leonard, and John B. McDowell

Personal details
- Born: August 1, 1927 New Castle, Pennsylvania, US
- Died: July 2, 2013 (aged 85) Greensburg, Pennsylvania, US
- Education: St. Fidelis Seminary; St. Vincent Seminary; Pontifical Lateran University

Anthony Gerard Bosco (August 1, 1927 – July 2, 2013) was an American prelate of the Catholic Church who served as the third bishop of the Diocese of Greensburg in Pennsylvania from 1987 to 2004. He previously served as an auxiliary bishop of the Diocese of Pittsburgh in Pennsylvania from 1970 to 1987.

== Early life and education ==
Anthony Bosco was born in New Castle, Pennsylvania, on August 1, 1927. Raised on Pittsburgh's North Side, Bosco graduated from North Catholic High School in Pittsburgh. He then attended St. Fidelis Seminary in Butler County, Pennsylvania, and St. Vincent Seminary in Latrobe, Pennsylvania.

== Career ==
=== Priesthood ===
Bosco was ordained a priest for the Diocese of Pittsburgh by Bishop John Francis Dearden on June 7, 1952 at the Cathedral of Saint Paul in Pittsburgh. He studied canon law at Lateran University in Rome, completing his study in 1957. Bosco held a variety of positions in the Pittsburgh chancery and was named a monsignor in 1968. During part of that time, he was a chaplain and instructor at Mercy Hospital School of Nursing in Pittsburgh.

=== Auxiliary Bishop of Pittsburgh ===
Pope Paul VI appointed Bosco as an auxiliary bishop of Pittsburgh and titular bishop of Labicum on May 4, 1970. He was consecrated by Cardinal John Joseph Wright on June 30, 1970, at the Cathedral of Saint Paul.

=== Bishop of Greensburg ===
Bosco was appointed by Pope John Paul II as bishop of Greensburg on April 2, 1987, after Bishop William G. Connare retired. Bosco was installed on June 30, 1987.

Bosco's West Highland West terriers, Joshua and Joshua II, were local celebrities within the Catholic community of Greensburg. John Paul II accepted Bosco's retirement as bishop of Greensburg on January 2, 2004.

== Death ==
Anthony Bosco died on July 2, 2013, at his residence in Greensburg.

Catholic Church titles
Preceded by William G. Connare	Bishop of Greensburg; 1987–2004	Succeeded by Lawrence Eugene Brandt
Preceded by –	Auxiliary Bishop of Pittsburgh; 1970–1987	Succeeded by –
