= Joseph A. Varacalli =

American sociologist

Joseph A. Varacalli (born January 14, 1952) is a Professor of Sociology at State University of New York, Nassau Community College and the co-founder of the Society for Catholic Social Scientists. A Catholic sociologist, he is also the author of three books: The Catholic Experience in America, Bright Promise, Failed Community, and Toward the Establishment of Liberal Catholicism in America.

== Childhood and education ==
Varacalli was the oldest of two sons to Joseph and Teresa Varacalli in Jersey City, New Jersey. He graduated from Lincoln High School in 1969. He received his B.A. in Sociology at Rutgers University, an M.A. in Sociology at the University of Chicago, and a PhD in Sociology from Rutgers in 1980.

== Academia ==
In 1981, Varacalli joined the Sociology department at S.U.N.Y. Nassau Community College. In 1999, Varacalli established the Center for Catholic Studies at Nassau Community College. Since the center's conception, its guest speakers have included Cardinal Avery Dulles, Fr. Joseph Fessio, George Weigel, J. Brian Benestad, Msgr. George A. Kelly, Kenneth Whitehead, Thomas E. Woods, James Como, and Oswald Sabrino. He also hosts a Catholic radio show, The Catholic Alternative, on the college radio station.

After co-founding the Society of Catholic Social Scientists, Varacalli was the editor-in-chief of the first four issues of The Catholic Social Science Review from 1996 to 1999. Since then, he has remained a frequent contributor to the journal.

Varacalli served on the Board of Directors for the Fellowship of Catholic Scholars from 1993 to 1995 and then again in 2002. In 2004, he received the Pope Pius XI Award from the Society of Catholic Scientists in 2004, and the Denis Dillon Award from the Long Island chapter of the Catholic League in 2007. Since September 2007, Varacalli has served on the Board of Advisors for the Catholic League for Religious and Civil Rights.

Varacalli has been published in Faith and Reason, Homiletic and Pastoral Review, Lay Witness, Nassau Review, and The Catholic Social Science Review.

== List of works ==
=== Books ===
- "The Catholic Experience in America" (2006)
- "Bright Promise: Failed Community: Catholics and the American Public Order" (2000)
- "Toward The Liberal Establishment in America" (1983)

=== Edited works ===
- "Encyclopedia of Catholic Social Thought, Social Science, and Social Policy" (with Michael Coulter, Stephen Krason, and Richard Myers) (2007)
- "Models and Images of Catholicism in Italian Americana: Academy and Society" (with Salvatore Primeggia, Salvatore LaGumina, and Donald J. DElia) (2004)
- "The Italian American Experience: An Encyclopedia" (with Salvatore Primeggia, Frank J. Cavaioli, and Salvatore LaGumina) (2000)
- "The Saints in the Lives of Italian-Americans: An Interdisciplinary Investigation" (with Salvatore Primeggia, Salvatore LaGumina, and Donald D'Elia) (1999)

== Selected articles ==
- "Gibson's Passion and the American Culture War," Catholic Social Science Review, Volume 10, 2005
- "On Being Catholic American," Homiletic and Pastoral Review, August/September 2004
- "The Sacred and Profane Among Italian American Catholics: The Giglio Feast," (co-authored with Salvatore Primeggia) International Journal of Politics, Culture, and Society, (Volume 9, Number 3, Spring, 1996)
- "Homophobia" at Seton Hall University: Sociology in Defense of the Faith," Faith and Reason, Volume XX, Number 3, 1994
