= Hugh L. Lamb =

American Catholic prelate (1890–1959)

His Excellency, The Most Reverend Hugh Louis Lamb
- Bishop of Greensburg; Titular Bishop of Elo
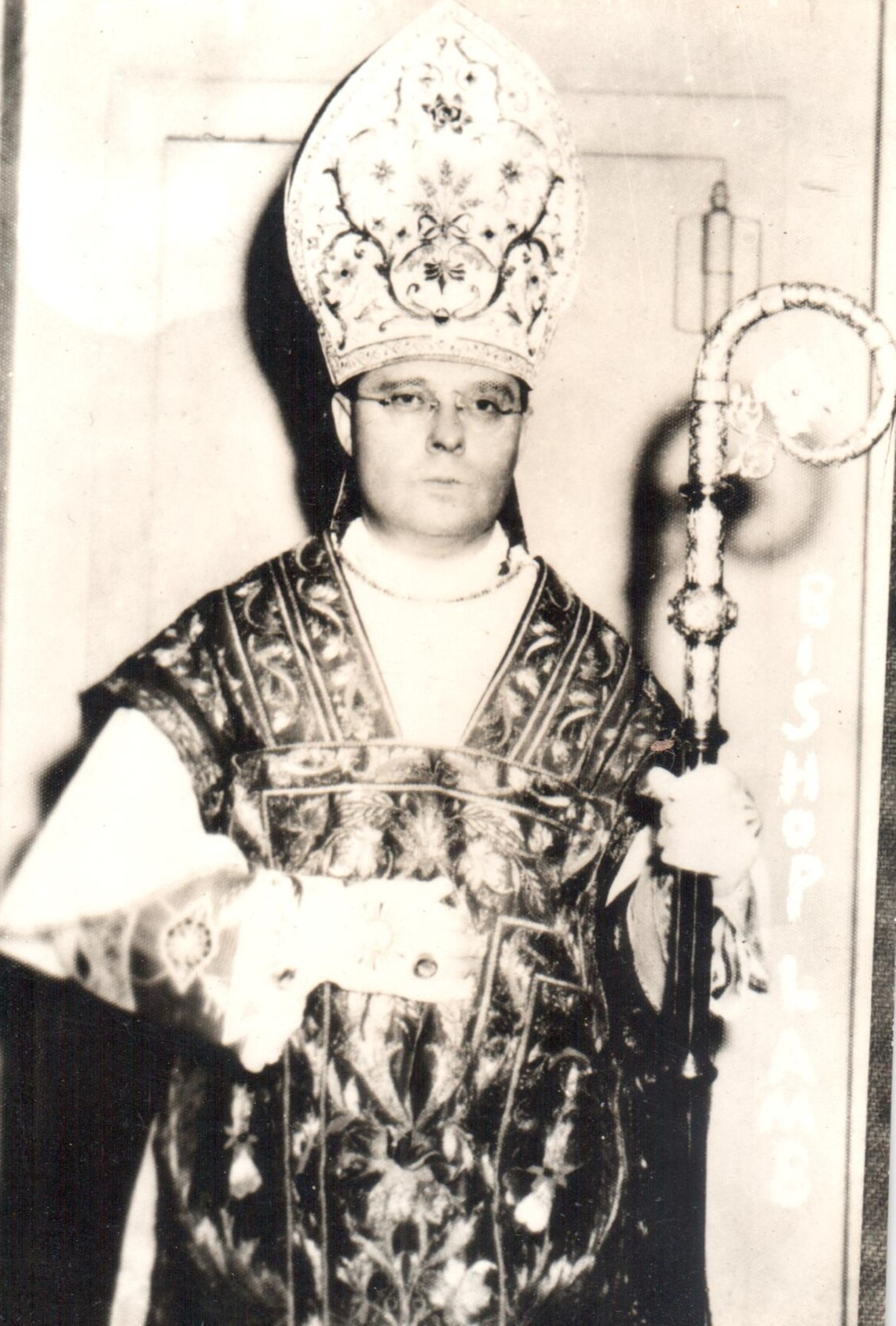
- Church: Catholic Church
- See: Greensburg
- In office: May 28, 1951—December 8, 1959
- Predecessor: none
- Successor: William G. Connare
- Previous post: Auxiliary Bishop of Philadelphia (1936-1951)

Orders
- Ordination: May 29, 1915 by Basilio Pompili
- Consecration: March 19, 1936 by Dennis Joseph Dougherty

Personal details
- Born: October 6, 1890 Modena, Pennsylvania, US
- Died: December 8, 1959 (aged 69) Greensburg, Pennsylvania, US
- Education: St. Charles Borromeo Seminary; Pontifical Urban University
- Motto: Soli deo gloria (Glory to God alone)

Hugh Louis Lamb (October 6, 1890 – December 8, 1959) was an American Catholic prelate who served as the first bishop of Greensburg in Pennsylvania from 1951 until his death in 1959. He previously served as an auxiliary bishop of the Archdiocese of Philadelphia in Pennsylvania from 1936 to 1951.

== Biography ==
=== Early life ===
Lamb was born on October 6, 1890, in Modena, Pennsylvania.He graduated from Coatesville High School in Caln Township, Pennsylvania, in 1907 and then enrolled in St. Charles Borromeo Seminary in Philadelphia. He then went to Rome to reside at the Pontifical North American College while studying at the Pontifical Urbaniana University. He obtained a doctorate in sacred theology in 1915.

=== Priesthood ===
While in Rome, Lamb was ordained to the priesthood for the Archdiocese of Philadelphia by Cardinal Basilio Pompili on May 29, 1915, at the Archbasilica of Saint John Lateran.

After his ordination, the archdiocese assigned Lamb to pastoral assignments in parishes in Philadelphia and Coatesville, Pennsylvania. He also taught at St. Charles Seminary. In 1923, he was named as secretary to Cardinal Dennis Dougherty and superintendent of archdiocesan schools until 1926. Lamb was named a domestic prelate of his holiness in 1927 and served as chancellor of the archdiocese until 1936.

In 1929, the Vatican elevated Lamb to the rank of protonotary apostolic.

In 1934, Lamb denounced Josephus Daniels, the American ambassador to Mexico, as "a consummate jackass". He accused Daniels of having; "easily succumbed to the flattery of Plutarco Calles, the power in Mexico, who is known as the God-hater ... [and] publicly expressed approval of the Socialistic and Communistic educational program."

=== Auxiliary Bishop of Philadelphia ===
On December 15, 1935, Lamb was appointed as an auxiliary bishop of Philadelphia and titular bishop of Elo by Pope Pius XI. He received his episcopal consecration at the Cathedral of Saints Peter and Paul in Philadelphia on March 19, 1936, from Dougherty. Bishops Gerald O'Hara and George L. Leech served as co-consecrators. As an auxiliary bishop, Lamb also served as vicar general of the archdiocese until 1951.

=== Bishop of Greensburg ===
On May 28, 1951, Pope Pius XII named Lamb as the first bishop of the newly erected Diocese of Greensburg. However, due to the unexpected death of Cardinal Dougherty on May 31st, Lamb remained in Philadelphia to run the archdiocese as apostolic administrator. He was relieved of this position in November 1951, when the Vatican named Bishop John Francis O'Hara as Dougherty's successor.

During his tenure in Greensburg, Lamb spent nearly $6.5 million on constructing or upgrading schools, hospitals and nursing homes. Eight new schools, including Greensburg Central Catholic High School, were created and 10 new parishes were established.Lamb was also instrumental in the founding of Jeannette District Memorial Hospital in Greensburg, donating over $300,000 for its construction and securing the Sisters of Charity of Seton Hill to staff it.

Hugh Lamb died at Jeanette Hospital after suffering a heart attack on December 8, 1959, at age 69.

Catholic Church titles
Preceded by none	Bishop of Greensburg; 1951—1959	Succeeded by William G. Connare
