= Nelson J. Pérez =

American Catholic prelate (born 1961)

His Excellency, The Most Reverend Nelson J. Pérez
- Archbishop of Philadelphia
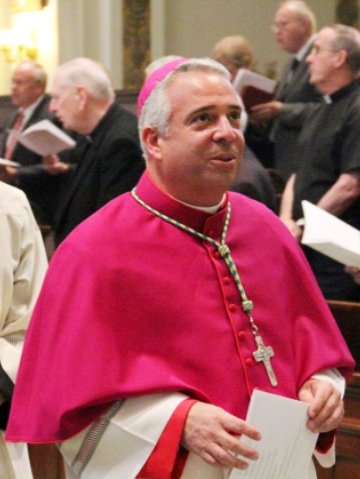
- Pérez in July 2021
- Church: Catholic Church
- Archdiocese: Philadelphia
- Appointed: January 23, 2020
- Installed: February 18, 2020
- Predecessor: Charles J. Chaput
- Previous posts: Auxiliary Bishop of Rockville Centre and Titular Bishop of Catrum (2012–2017); Bishop of Cleveland (2017–2020)

Orders
- Ordination: May 20, 1989 by Anthony Bevilacqua
- Consecration: July 25, 2012 by William Murphy, Charles J. Chaput, and Paul Henry Walsh

Personal details
- Born: June 16, 1961 (age 65) Miami, Florida, U.S.
- Motto: Confide et spera (Latin for 'Trust and hope')
- Styles
- Reference style: His Excellency; The Most Reverend
- Spoken style: Your Excellency
- Religious style: Archbishop

Nelson Jesus Pérez (born June 16, 1961) is an American Catholic prelate serving as archbishop of Philadelphia since 2020. He was previously Bishop of Cleveland from 2017 to 2020 and an auxiliary bishop of the Diocese of Rockville Centre from 2012 to 2017.

== Early life and education ==
Pérez was born on June 16, 1961, in Miami. His parents, David and Emma Pérez, were both exiles from Cuba. As a child, the family moved to West New York, New Jersey.

Pérez attended P.S. Number 4 and Memorial High School in West New York. Pérez attended Montclair State University in Montclair, New Jersey, where he earned a Bachelor of Arts in 1983.

He then began teaching at Colegio La Piedad, a Catholic elementary school in Carolina, Puerto Rico.

He then attended St. Charles Borromeo Seminary in Philadelphia, where he earned a Master of Arts and a Master of Divinity degree in 1988 and 1989, respectively.

== Career ==
=== Ordination and priesthood ===
Pérez was ordained to the priesthood by Cardinal Anthony Bevilacqua for the Archdiocese of Philadelphia on May 20, 1989. After his ordination, Pérez was appointed curate at Saint Ambrose Parish in Philadelphia. In 1993, he left this position to become the founding director of the Catholic Institute for Evangelization in Philadelphia.

In 1994, Pérez assumed the additional job of teaching psychology and religious studies at La Salle University in Philadelphia, working there until 2008. In 1998, Pérez was named a Chaplain of His Holiness by Pope John Paul II with the title of monsignor.

In 2002, Pérez left his position at the Catholic Institute to become pastor of Saint William Parish in Philadelphia. The archdiocese moved him in 2009 to serve as pastor of Saint Agnes Parish in West Chester, Pennsylvania. That same year, Pérez was named a Prelate of Honour of His Holiness by Pope Benedict XVI.

=== Auxiliary Bishop of Rockville Centre ===
On June 8, 2012, Pérez was appointed titular bishop of Catrum and auxiliary bishop of the Diocese of Rockville Center by Pope Benedict XVI. He received his episcopal consecration by Bishop William Murphy on July 25, 2012. Pérez was appointed episcopal vicar for the Hispanic Ministry, overseeing fifty-four parishes.

=== Bishop of Cleveland ===
On July 11, 2017, Pope Francis appointed Pérez as the 11th bishop of the Diocese of Cleveland. He was installed on September 5, 2017.

In 2018, Pérez protested the Trump administration's policy of separating the children of undocumented immigrant families from their parents, declaring, "We've lost our moral compass."

=== Archbishop of Philadelphia ===
Pérez was named archbishop of the Archdiocese of Philadelphia on January 23, 2020, by Pope Francis, succeeding Archbishop Charles J. Chaput. His installation Mass was celebrated on February 18, 2020. He is the first Hispanic American bishop of Philadelphia.

In July 2025, addressing the mass deportation efforts by the Trump administration, Pérez issued a letter calling for solidarity with immigrants. In the letter, he wrote, "As the son of immigrants, I have found recent events particularly heartbreaking." He continued to say, "we strongly advocate for immigration policies that guarantee the protection of life, liberty, and property of all those who call the United States of America home, natural born citizens and those working toward citizenship alike."

== See also ==
- Catholic Church hierarchy
- Catholic Church in the United States
- Historical list of the Catholic bishops of the United States
- List of Catholic bishops of the United States
- Lists of patriarchs, archbishops, and bishops

Catholic Church titles
Preceded by Charles J. Chaput	Archbishop of Philadelphia; 2020–present	Succeeded by Incumbent
Preceded by Richard Gerard Lennon	Bishop of Cleveland; 2017–2020	Succeeded by Edward C. Malesic
Preceded by -	Auxiliary Bishop of Rockville Centre; 2012–2017	Succeeded by -
