= Blessed Sacrament Cathedral (Greensburg, Pennsylvania) =

Historic church in Pennsylvania, United States

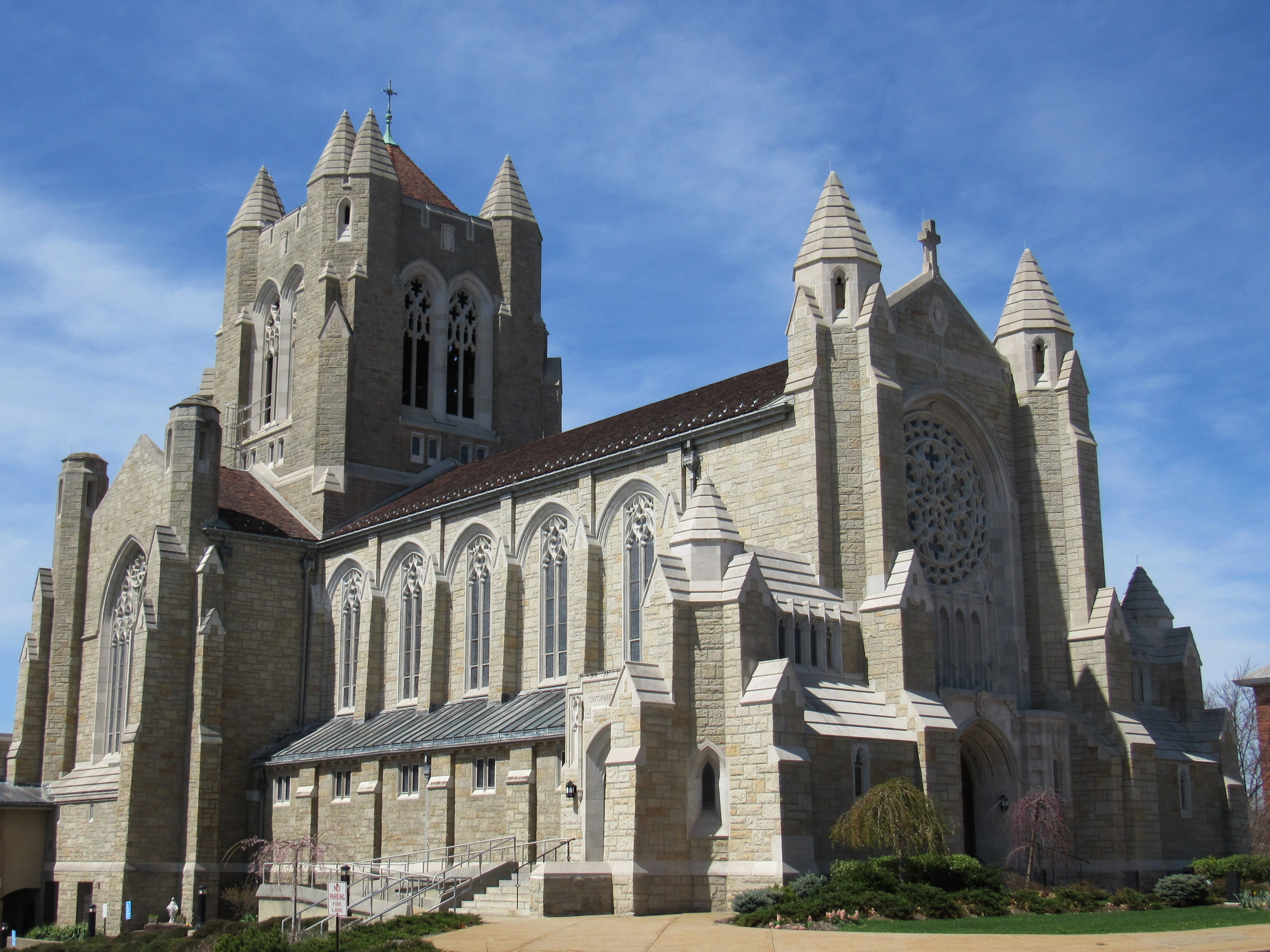

- Location in Pennsylvania Blessed Sacrament Cathedral (the United States)
- 40°18′23″N 79°32′46″W
- Location: 300 N. Main St. Greensburg, Pennsylvania
- Country: United States
- Denomination: Roman Catholic Church
- Website: www.blessedsacramentcathedral.org

History
- Status: Cathedral/Parish
- Founded: 1789

Architecture
- Architect(s): Comes, Perry and McMullen
- Style: Gothic Revival
- Completed: 1928

Specifications
- Materials: Sandstone; Indiana Limestone

Administration
- Diocese: Greensburg

Clergy
- Bishop: Most Rev. Larry J. Kulick
- Rector: Msgr. Raymond E. Riffle
- Blessed Sacrament Cathedral
- U.S. Historic district – Contributing property
- Part of: Academy Hill Historic District (ID99000516)
- Added to NRHP: April 29, 1999

Blessed Sacrament Cathedral is the mother church of the Roman Catholic Diocese of Greensburg in Greensburg, Pennsylvania, in the United States. In 1999, it was included as a contributing property in the Academy Hill Historic District.

Blessed Sacrament Parish was preceded by Most Holy Sacrament Parish, erected in 1789 in Greensburgs. The first Most Holy Sacrament Church was erected in 1846, followed by a second church in 1887. This church was replaced with the third Most Holy Sacrament Church in 1928

When the Diocese of Greensburg was erected in 1951, Most Holy Sacrament Church was converted into Blessed Sacrament Cathedral.

== History ==
=== Most Holy Sacrament Churches ===
The precursor of Blessed Sacrament Cathedral was Most Holy Sacrament Parish It was established in 1789 as the first Catholic parish in Greensburg. Twenty-five families paid about $25 to buy a plot of land and start building a log cabin church. However, due to lack of funding, this church was never completed.

In 1846, the parish succeeded in building its first church, a brick structure. It was constructed in conjunction with the monks and priests of the Order of Saint Benedict from Saint Vincent Archabbey in Latrobe. Pennsylvania. The parish added a rectory to the church campus in 1850. Three years later, the Benedictines took over the operation of Most Holy Sacrament from the diocese.

The Benedictines constructed a new rectory in 1885 and replaced the church with a larger structure in 1887. By the early 1920s, the explosive growth of the diocese necessitated the building of an even larger church. The diocese hired the Pittsburgh architectural firm of Comes, Perry and McMullen to design the new structure. The second Most Holy Sacrament Church was dedicated in May 1928.

=== Blessed Sacrament Cathedral ===
In 1951, Pope Pius XII erected the Diocese of Greensburg; Most Holy Sacrament Church was designated as Blessed Sacrament Cathedral. As part of the transition, the Benedictines relinquished control of the parish to the new diocese.

In 1971, the diocese undertook the first renovation of Blessed Sacrament Cathedral. It hired the architectural firm Celli-Flynn & Associates of Philadelphia to redesign the interior in 1971 to conform to liturgical changes from the Second Vatican Council of the 1960s. The diocese moved the main altar from the apse to a new position in the sanctuary

By the early 1980s, the diocese had decided to replace the rectory with a parish administration building. The project was completed in 1987. In 2003, the diocese purchased the former Sisters of Charity convent to create a center for the formation of priests.

In 2010 to 2011, the diocese began a major renovation of the cathedral interior. The electrical and lighting systems were upgraded, the pews refinished, and the stained glass windows restored. The diocese replaced the kneelers, ambo, cathedra and baptismal font.

== Cathedral exterior ==
The present church was constructed in the English Gothic style. Blessed Sacrament constructed of sandstone and Indiana limestone. The square tower is 125 feet (38 m) high. The massive appearance of the church building is typical of those found in Northern Europe. The stained glass windows were created by Franz Mayer & Co. of Munich, Germany.

Cathedral images

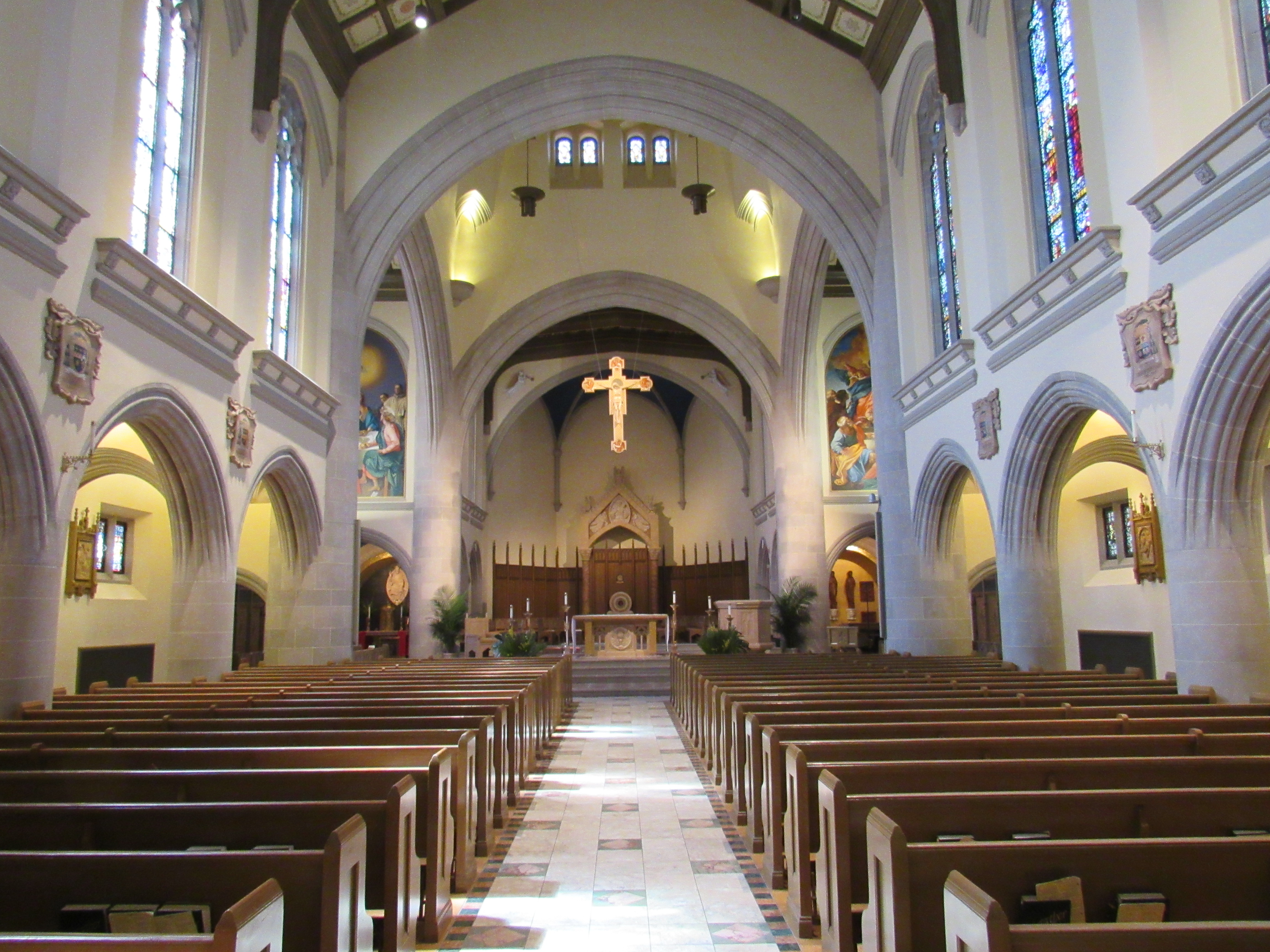
Cathedral interior (2017)

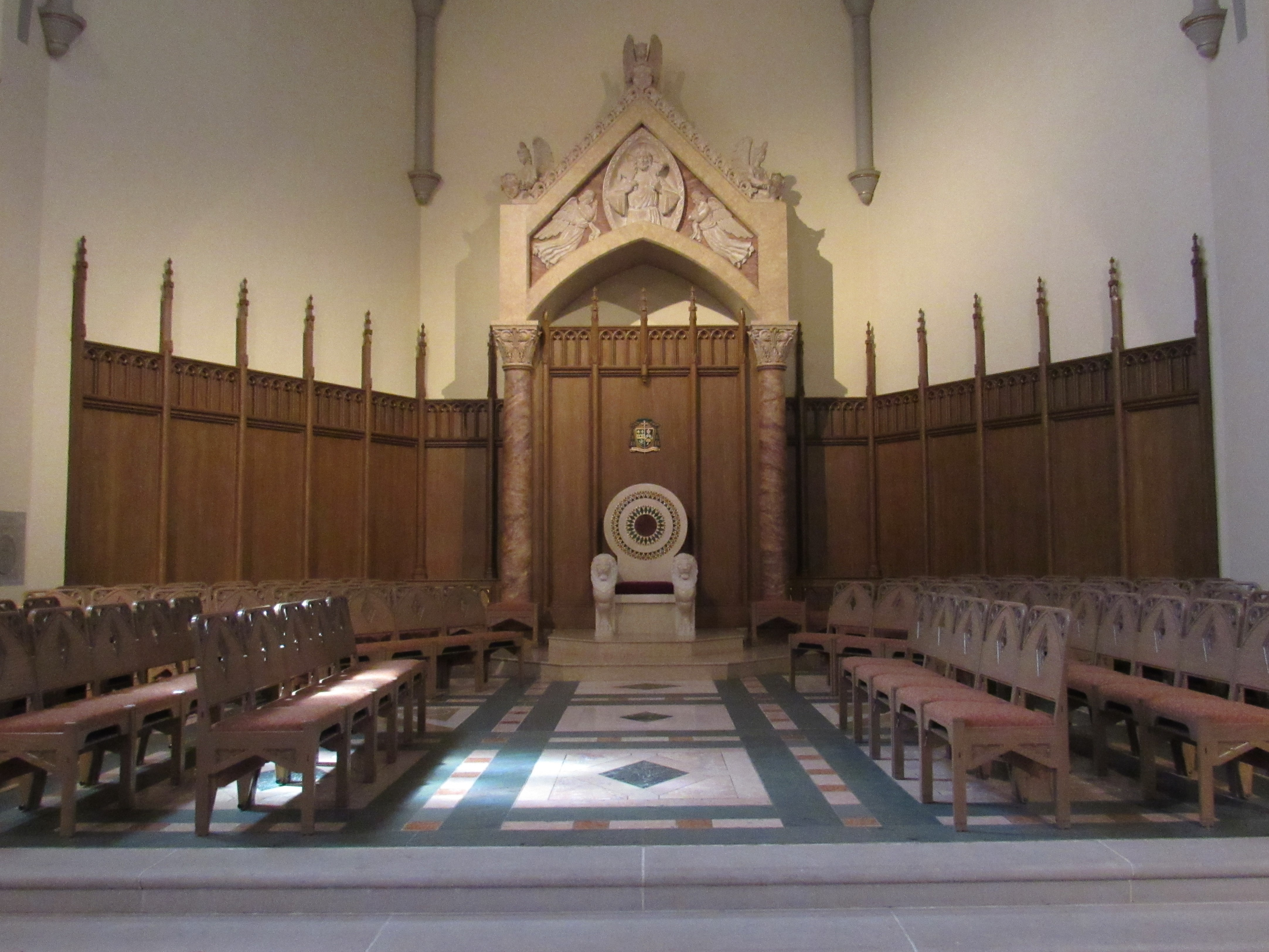
Presbyterium (2017)

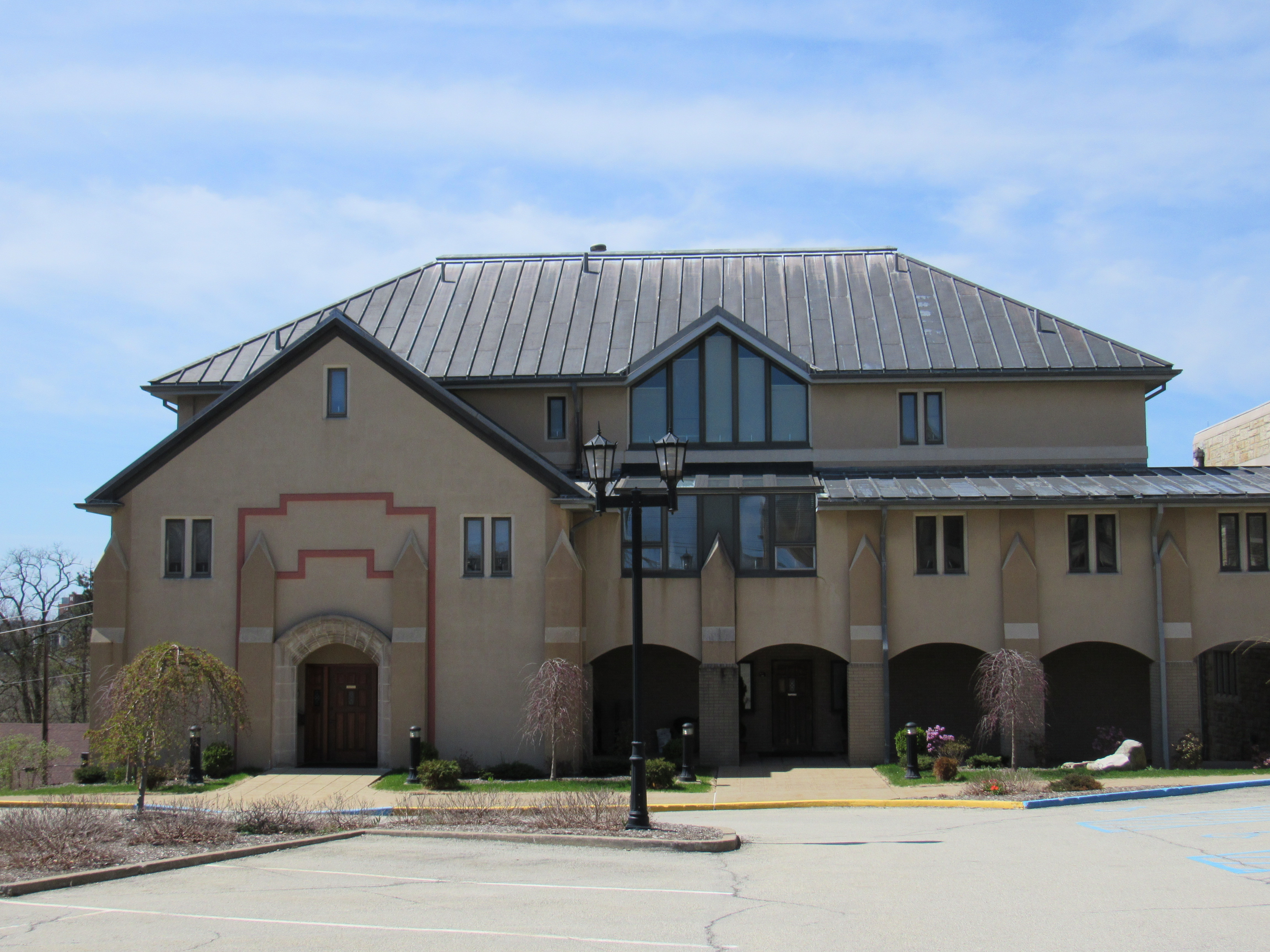
Parish Administration Building (2017)

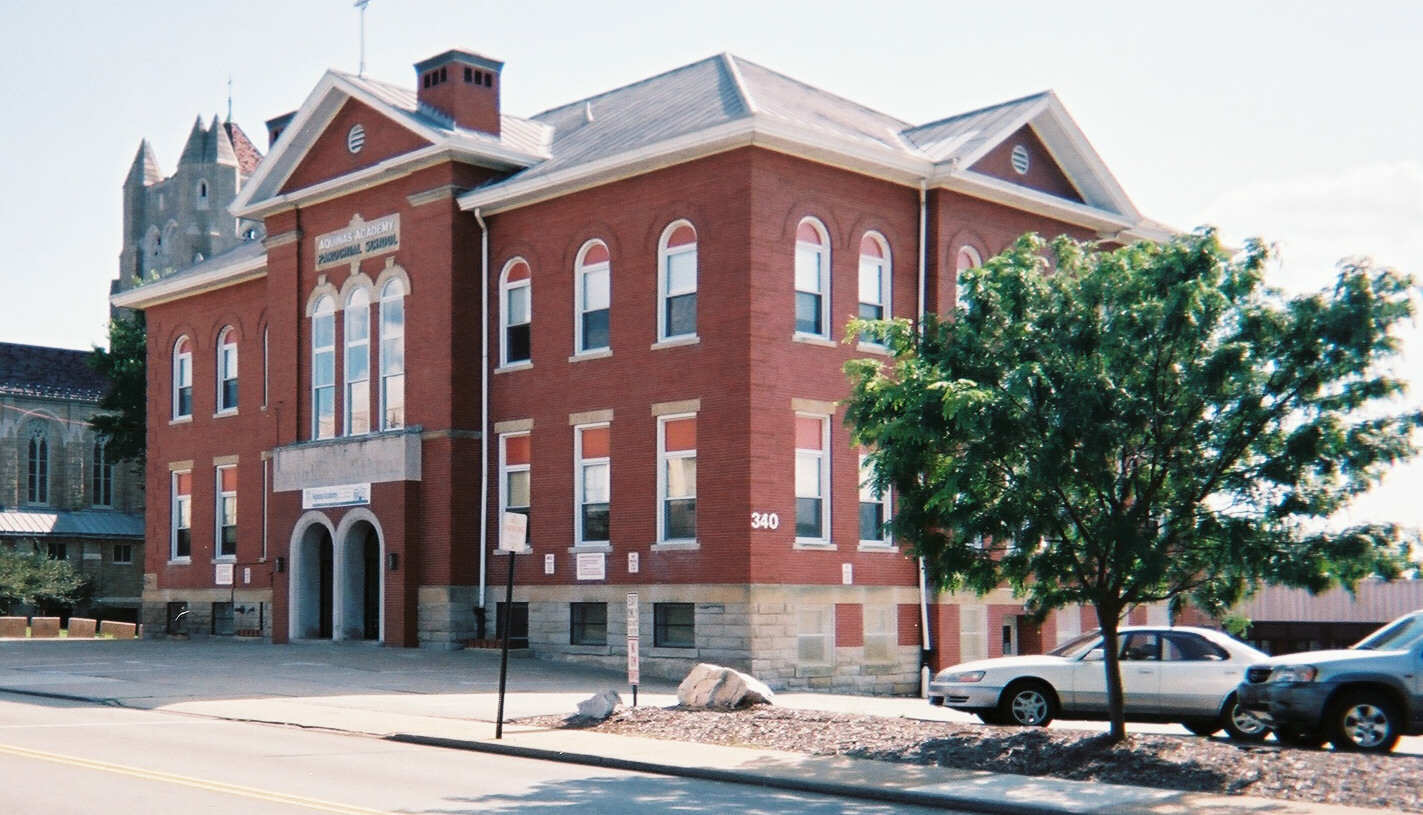
Aquinas Academy (2008)

== See also ==
- List of Catholic cathedrals in the United States
- List of cathedrals in the United States
