= Grand jury investigation of Catholic Church sexual abuse in Pennsylvania =

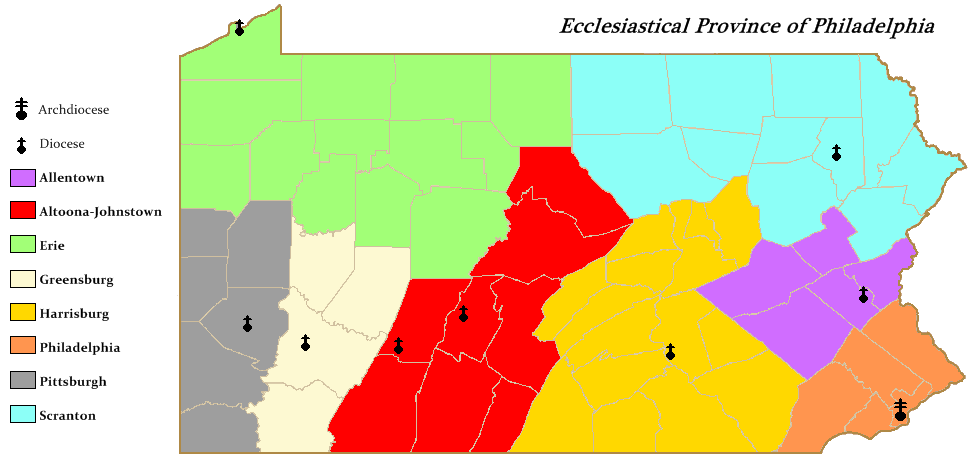
The August 2018 grand jury report includes all Pennsylvania dioceses except Philadelphia and Altoona–Johnstown, which had already issued earlier reports.

A grand jury investigation of Catholic Church sexual abuse in Pennsylvania lasted from 2016 to 2018, and investigated the history of clerical sexual abuse in six Pennsylvania dioceses.

This investigation focused on sexual abuse by Catholic clergy in six of the eight Pennsylvania dioceses – Allentown, Scranton, Harrisburg, Pittsburgh, Greensburg, and Erie. The Archdiocese of Philadelphia and Diocese of Altoona–Johnstown were not included, as they had been the subjects of earlier investigations.

The grand jury's report, released in August 2018, was the broadest examination by a government agency in the United States of child sexual abuse in the Catholic Church. Legislative recommendations of the grand jury report were later signed into law by Pennsylvania Governor Tom Wolf on November 26, 2019.

== Grand jury investigation begins ==
Beginning in early 2016, sexual abuse by Catholic clergy in six Pennsylvania dioceses – Allentown, Scranton, Harrisburg, Pittsburgh, Greensburg, and Erie – were examined by a grand jury investigation, conducted by the office of Pennsylvania Attorney General Josh Shapiro.

Each of these six dioceses is a suffragan diocese of the Archdiocese of Philadelphia. A similar grand jury report which inspired this investigation had been released in 2016 detailing sex abuse in another Archdiocese of Philadelphia suffragan diocese in Altoona-Johnstown.

According to officials in the Diocese of Harrisburg, the diocese had intended to release a list of accused priests in September 2016, but were ordered by the Attorney General's Office not to do so, lest it compromise his investigation.

According to The Philadelphia Inquirer, in 2017 the Diocese of Harrisburg and the Diocese of Greensburg attempted to shut down the grand jury investigation.

On July 27, 2018, the Pennsylvania Supreme Court ordered that a redacted copy of the grand jury report be released to the public. The list would name over 300 accused "predator priests"; two dozen others were allowed to keep their names off the list. The grand jury also charged two priests, John T. Sweeney of Greensburg and David Lee Poulson of Erie, as a result of the report, as their reported abuse was within the statute of limitations. Sweeney pleaded guilty on July 31, 2018 to molesting a 4th grade boy at some point between September 1991 and June 1992 was given a 11 1/2 month to 5-year prison sentence in December 2018, which he immediately began serving. Poulson plead guilty to two counts related to sexual abuse in October 2018 and began serving a 2 1/2 to 14-year jail sentence in January 2019. On March 15, 2019, Erie Bishop Lawrence T. Persico announced that Pope Francis had issued an order defrocking Poulson on March 5, 2019.

== Bishops' actions prior to release of report ==
In April 2018, the Diocese of Erie published a list of 34 priests and 17 laypeople who had been "credibly accused" of sexually abusing children. By July, the list had grown to include 64 names.

On July 31, 2018, John T. Sweeney, a former priest in the Diocese of Greensburg, pleaded guilty to molesting a 4th grade boy at some point between September 1991 and June 1992. Immediately following Sweeney's plea, the Diocese of Greensburg made a statement pledging future cooperation. In the statement, which was reported by Crux on August 4, the Diocese of Greensburg agreed to continue educating “both children and adults in parishes and schools of the Diocese of Greensburg on how to spot and report suspected abuse.” The Diocese also agreed to recommend reporting incidents of sexual abuse to the PA ChildLine and report any alleged incident of sexual abuse to "PA Childline and the appropriate district attorney".

On August 1, 2018, the Diocese of Harrisburg released the names of 71 clergy members accused of engaging in sexual abuse of children. The list included priests, deacons, and seminarians of the diocese, as well as clergy from other dioceses or from religious orders who had served in the Diocese of Harrisburg. On this date, Bishop Ronald Gainer announced the name of every man who had served as a bishop in the Diocese of Harrisburg since 1947 would be removed from any building or room named in their honor, due to their failure to protect victims from abuse.

On August 1, 2018, Matt Kerr, spokesman for the Diocese of Allentown, announced that the Diocese would cooperate with a Pennsylvania Supreme Court ruling and publish a list containing names of clergy suspected of taking part in sexual abuse of children. Kerr stated that the Diocese would post the list of "credibly accused priests" on its website the day a grand jury report is released.

On August 5, 2018, Pittsburgh Bishop David Zubik sent letters confirming the Diocese of Pittsburgh would cooperate with the Pennsylvania Supreme Court order and release the list of clergy accused of sex abuse when the grand jury report is made public. The letters were read during mass across the six-county diocese. In his letter, Bishop Zubik noted that the diocese implemented policies to deal with sexual abuse 30 years ago. Clergy, church employees, and volunteers are all required to go through sexual abuse training programs and criminal background checks. Zubik also noted that 90 percent of all the allegations in the report related to the diocese of Pittsburgh occurred before 1990.

On August 6, 2018, the Diocese of Scranton released a statement stating that Bishop Joseph Bambera would cooperate with the investigation and publish the list of "credibly accused clergy" when the grand jury report was published.

== Grand jury report released ==
The grand jury report was published on August 14, 2018. It showed that 301 priests were accused of sexually abusing more than 1,000 children in the six dioceses and were routinely shuffled from parish to parish in order to avoid scrutiny. The report said there are "likely thousands more victims whose records were lost or who were too afraid to come forward." The majority of the victims were boys.

The New York Times called the report "the broadest examination yet by a government agency in the United States of child sexual abuse in the Catholic Church."

The panel had examined a half-million pages of diocesan documents and interviewed dozens of witnesses. It found that bishops and diocesan leaders aimed to avoid bad publicity and financial liability. Hundreds of known offenders were returned to active ministry after being "laundered" in "treatment facilities".

Columnist Michael Sean Winters described the report as "spotty and inconsistent." Winters criticized the media response to the report and that it was weaponized by far-right groups such as Church Militant and LifeSiteNews in order to takedown Wuerl and attack Pope Francis.

Former New York Times reporter Peter Steinfels called the report "Grossly misleading, irresponsible, inaccurate, and unjust" noting that a third or more of the accusations were made know after the Dallas Charter and that such "inaccurate and incomplete" reports were used to push Wuerl out of office. Steinfels accused Shapiro of engineering the report in order to discredit church opposition.

=== Report's statements regarding abusers ===
A total of 301 priests were accused of sexually abusing children: 99 from the Diocese of Pittsburgh, 59 from the Diocese of Scranton, 45 from the Diocese of Harrisburg, 41 from the Diocese of Erie (two of whose names were redacted), 37 from the Diocese of Allentown and 20 from the Diocese of Greensburg.

Of the more than 300 priests identified in the report, only two were involved in abuse since the year 2008, and both of these had been reported by their dioceses. If the figures from this report are combined with those from the Philadelphia and Altoona-Johnstown dioceses, the results show that about 8% of the 5,000 priests who served in Pennsylvania during the 70-year period covered by the report were credibly accused of abuse.

Among the incidents documented by the report were "a priest who raped a young girl in the hospital after she had her tonsils out; a victim tied up and whipped with leather straps by a priest; and another priest who was allowed to stay in ministry after impregnating a young girl and arranging for her to have an abortion."

The report also stated that some priests in the Diocese of Pittsburgh ran a child porn ring in the 1970s and 1980s and also "used whips, violence and sadism in raping their victims". The children who were sexually molested and had their pictures taken for the child porn ring were given gold crosses so they would be recognized by other abusive priests who sought to use them.

The Diocese of Greensburg had a priest who impregnated a 17-year-old girl. The report also revealed that the priest not only impregnated the minor, but also married her after forging a head pastor's name on a marriage certificate and then divorced her months later.

Former Erie priest and current bishop of Altoona-Johnstown Mark Bartchak was criticized for his handling of a 2005 investigation against former Erie priest William Presley. Bartchak was assigned by the Vatican during this time to investigate claims against Presley, who served in the Erie Diocese between 1963 and 1986, and continuously re-interviewed a male victim who previously disclosed his alleged abuse to the diocese in 1982, 1987 and 2002.

Presley was transferred to the Diocese of Harrisburg in 1986. On August 25, 2005, Bartchak sent a confidential memo to then-Erie Bishop Donald Walter Trautman. Parts of the memo read “I was not surprised to learn from other witnesses from the Elk County area, that there are likely to be other victims” and that "it is likely that there may be others who were also of the age for the offenses to be considered delicts, but to what end is it necessary to follow every lead?”

Bartchak also stated in another memo following a meeting with Trautman on August 29, 2005, "Bishop Trautman decided that in order to preclude further scandal, these additional witnesses should not be contacted, especially given the fact that it is not likely that they will lead to information concerning delicts involving minors under 16 years of age.”

=== Report's statements regarding bishops ===
The report named several bishops as having helped to protect abusive priests and cover up complaints.

Cardinal Donald Wuerl (formerly Archbishop of Washington), who was Bishop of Pittsburgh from 1988 to 2006, is named in the report over 200 times. It states that Wuerl allowed Father Ernest Paone to be transferred to another diocese, despite a history of accusations of child abuse dating back to the early 1960s. Wuerl also allowed another accused abuser, Father William O'Malley to return to active ministry in 1998, despite the fact that O'Malley was facing allegations of sexual abuse and had admitted that he was sexually interested in adolescents.

The report also noted that Wuerl had written to the Vatican to warn them about the problem of abusive priests in 1989. Moreover, after Wuerl removed accused child-abuser Father Anthony J. Cipolla from ministry, the Vatican countermanded this and insisted that Cipolla be returned to ministry; in response, Wuerl flew to Rome in 1993 and convinced the Vatican court to ban Cipolla from ministry.

Cardinal Donald Wuerl stated that while Bishop of Pittsburgh from 1988 to 2006, he had "established strong policies that addressed the needs of abuse survivors, removed priests from ministry and protected the most vulnerable in the community," as well as traveling to Rome to make sure an abusive priest was removed from ministry.

He also launched a website, "The Wuerl Record", containing a defense of his actions during that era, but after an outcry on social media, the website was taken down.

A spokesman for the Archdiocese of Washington stated that Wuerl "has no intention of resigning. On August 18, 2018, it was announced that Wuerl would not attend the World Meeting of Families in Dublin, where he had been scheduled to give a keynote address. Wuerl later resigned as Archbishop of Washington, D.C., on October 12, 2018, and had requested to do so in September.

In response to Wuerl's defense of his actions following the release of the report, Attorney General Shapiro stated: "Cardinal Wuerl is not telling the truth. Many of his statements in response to the grand jury report are directly contradicted by the Church's own documents and records from their secret archives."

After the report was released, Bishop David Zubik of Pittsburgh stated, "There was no cover-up going on. I think that it’s important to be able to state that. We have over the course of the last 30 years, for sure, been transparent about everything that has in fact been transpiring."

Bishop Thomas J. Tobin had been an auxiliary bishop in the Diocese of Pittsburgh between 1992 and 1996, and vicar general prior to that time. He stated that in those roles, he was not involved in "issues involving clergy". He also stated, "In my experience, the Diocese of Pittsburgh has been very responsible and transparent in responding to allegations of sexual abuse, and has been one of the leading dioceses of the country in that regard."

Allentown Bishop Alfred Schlert was also named as an "enabler" during the time he was vicar general to Bishop Edward Cullen.

Bishop Alfred A. Schlert of the Diocese of Allentown issued a video apology on behalf of the Allentown Diocese. In his apology, Schlert stated that most of the incidents of sexual abuse date back decades and that most of the accused priests in the diocese were either dead or no longer active in the ministry and that the diocese has had a zero-tolerance policy against sex abuse since 2003.

The grand jury faulted former Erie Bishop Donald Trautman for praising Rev. Chester Gawronski for "many acts of kindness" and "deep faith" after Gawronsky had admitted fondling at least twelve boys. In 2001, Trautman renewed Gawronski's five-year term as a chaplain for St. Mary's Home in Erie. Trautman's predecessor Bishop Michael Murphy was also criticized in the report for allowing Gawronski to remain in the Diocese despite numerous allegations of sexual abuse. Murphy and Trautman reassigned Gawronski multiple times between 1987 and 2002.

Former Erie Bishop Donald Trautman criticized Shapiro's portrayal of him and noted that he had established guidelines in 1993 concerning how to deal with sexual abuse and later established the Diocesan Office for the Protection of Children and Youth in 2003 to protect children from sex abuse.

Bishop Lawrence T. Persico of the Diocese of Erie, who received praise from Shapiro, acknowledged there was a cover-up in the church. Persico subsequently stated that he felt that the grand jury report should have included the names of accused laypeople who worked for the Erie Diocese as well.

The Diocese of Harrisburg was faulted negotiating confidential settlements of sexual abuse cases in the diocese since 2002. Some of the agreements in the settlements also included confidentiality provisions.

The report criticized former bishop William Keeler for inaction against abuse during his time as Bishop of Harrisburg. Keeler had been notified of accusations of sexual abuse against priest Arthur Long in 1987. Long was later transferred from the Diocese of Harrisburg to the Archdiocese of Baltimore after Keeler was appointed Archbishop of Baltimore.

Harrisburg Bishop Ronald Gainer apologized on behalf of the diocese, and set up a website which contains information on how to report sex abuse, contact information for the Victim Assistance Office, and how the diocese says it confronted the issue of sex abuse.

== Responses by bishops and former bishops of these dioceses ==
On August 9, 2018, Greensburg Bishop Edward Malesic issued an apology on behalf of the diocese, acknowledged there were numerous reports of sex abuse of children between the 1950s and 1980s, and announced that the Diocese would release the names of the accused clergy when the grand jury report is published.

On August 31, 2018, in the Diocese of Scranton, Bishop Joseph Bambera forbade predecessor Bishop James Timlin from representing the diocese in public, given Timlin's failure to protect children from abusers. Bambera himself had served as the Vicar for Priests for the Diocese of Scranton from 1995 to 1998, and he admitted that during that time he had helped Bishop Timlin reassign a priest who had abused a minor, although the decision was made by Timlin. Bambera emphasized that since becoming bishop in 2010, he has pursued a zero-tolerance policy toward clerical abuse.

On August 26, 2020, Malesic, who at the time was departing from the Diocese of Greensburg to become Bishop of Cleveland, announced that the Diocese of Greensburg found sex abuse allegations against Rev. Emil Payer, who had been convicted of stealing money his South Huntingdon church, to be "credible."

== Responses by other Catholic Church officials not connected to Pennsylvania ==
=== Responses by other United States bishops ===
On August 16, 2018, Cardinal Daniel DiNardo, President of the United States Conference of Catholic Bishops, issued a statement promising that the bishops' conference would create "new and confidential channels for reporting complaints against bishops", and would strive for "more effective resolution of future complaints".

Archbishop Robert J. Carlson of the Archdiocese of St. Louis invited the Missouri attorney general's office to conduct an inspection of the archdiocesan files and to produce a report on clerical abuse in the state.

Because seven of the priests in the Pennsylvania report had ties to Illinois, Illinois Attorney General Lisa Madigan asked for all information regarding those priests. Cardinal Blase Cupich, Archbishop of Chicago, stated that Madigan was welcome to examine all the archdiocesan files, and indeed that they had already released the files in 2014–2015.

=== Responses by the pope and bishops outside the United States ===
On August 16, Vatican spokesman Greg Burke issued a statement regarding the Pennsylvania grand jury report. It stated, "The Holy See treats with great seriousness the work of the Investigating Grand Jury of Pennsylvania and the lengthy Interim Report it has produced. The Holy See condemns unequivocally the sexual abuse of minors. ... Victims should know that the Pope is on their side." It also stated, "By finding almost no cases after 2002, the Grand Jury's conclusions are consistent with previous studies showing that Catholic Church reforms in the United States drastically reduced the incidence of clergy child abuse."

On August 20, Pope Francis issued an ecclesiastical letter which discussed the grand jury report. It stated, "In recent days, a report was made public which detailed the experiences of at least a thousand survivors, victims of sexual abuse, the abuse of power and of conscience at the hands of priests over a period of approximately seventy years. Even though it can be said that most of these cases belong to the past, nonetheless as time goes on we have come to know the pain of many of the victims." The pope also wrote, "The heart-wrenching pain of these victims, which cries out to heaven, was long ignored, kept quiet or silenced. But their outcry was more powerful than all the measures meant to silence it." Moreover, "With shame and repentance, we acknowledge as an ecclesial community that we were not where we should have been, that we did not act in a timely manner, realizing the magnitude and the gravity of the damage done to so many lives. We showed no care for the little ones; we abandoned them."

However, La Stampa reported that the pope was not planning on issuing any new policies for abusers or for bishops who cover up abuse, deeming the current regulatory instruments and rules sufficient. The article noted that canon law already provides for the possibility of removal from ecclesiastical office "for grave reasons", and in his motu proprio of June 4, 2016, Pope Francis stated that these grave reasons include "the negligence of a Bishop in the exercise of his office, and in particular in relation to cases of sexual abuse inflicted on minors and vulnerable adults".

The new Mexican Cardinal Sergio Obeso Rivera stated that while some accusations made by victims of sexual abuse are valid, "sometimes those who accuse men of the Church should [be careful] because they have long tails that are easily stepped on."

== State government enacts new legislation ==
On November 26, 2019, Pennsylvania Governor Tom Wolf signed into law legislation which significantly reformed the state's child sex abuse statute. The new law abolishes Pennsylvania's criminal statute of limitations on childhood sexual abuse and extends the timeline victims have to file civil action against their abusers from 12 to 37 years. It also clarifies penalties for failure to report child abuse by making such an offense a third degree felony rather than a misdemeanor. In addition, the legislation also makes conversations with law enforcement agents exempt from non-disclosure agreements and creates a fund for victims of sexual abuse to pay for abuse-related therapy. The provisions in the new legislation were also recommended by the grand jury report.

== Pennsylvania Supreme Court intervenes ==
On April 16, 2020, Shapiro revealed in an article for the Pittsburgh Tribune-Review that two recent Pennsylvania Supreme Court decisions eliminated the ability for any institution, including the Catholic Church, to prevent authorities in the state of Pennsylvania from notifying people if someone who was convicted of violent sex abuse resides in their community and allows sexual predators who seek to end their sex abuse compulsion to get mental hospital treatment. On November 20, 2020, the Pennsylvania Supreme Court denied petitions which were filed by the Diocese of Pittsburgh and the Diocese of Greensburg to grant stays which would've delayed three ongoing lawsuits against the Diocese of Pittsburgh and one ongoing lawsuit against the Diocese of Greensburg.

== Diocese of Harrisburg cases and bankruptcy ==
On February 19, 2020, the Diocese of Harrisburg filed for bankruptcy in light of the sex abuse lawsuits. The Diocese is the first in the state of Pennsylvania to do so. In its bankruptcy filing, the Diocese, which is also facing new sex abuse lawsuits, stated that it was struggling financially and had only $1 to $10 million in assets and $50 million in liabilities. On November 5, 2020, former York County Catholic priest John G. Allen, who was defrocked by 2019 after he was named in the grand jury report, pled guilty to six misdemeanors – two counts each of indecent assault against a child under 13, indecent assault of a child under 16 and corruption of minors between 1997 and 2002.

== Diocese of Allentown lawsuits ==
On May 20, 2020, it was revealed that Timothy Paul McGettigan, a former parishioner of the St. Catharine of Siena in Reading who was now living in Texas, had filed a lawsuit against the Diocese of Allentown. In his court paperwork, which was filed in Lehigh County McGettigan stated that in the 1970s, he was sexually abused by two priests, Rev. Joseph Grembocki and Rev. David A. Soderlund, as well as several other priests whom he cannot identify. Grembocki died in 2016, while Soderlund was defrocked in 2005. Though Soderlund was named in the Pennsylvania grand jury report, Grembocki was not. On August 14, 2020, it was announced that 20 new sex abuse lawsuits were filed against the Diocese of Allentown.

== Diocese of Erie lawsuits ==
On July 18, 2020, it was revealed that the Diocese of Erie was undergoing a potential new sex abuse lawsuit alleging that Diocese's compensation fund had yet to pay victims of abuse allegedly committed at St. Hedwig Catholic Church and its long-closed school. On July 24, 2020, a woman alleging that Rev. Michael G. Barletta, who was among the 301 “predator priests” named in the grand jury report, sued the Diocese of Erie on allegations that it shielded Barletta from potential prosecution after Barletta molested her when she was in grade school in the 1970s. By this point in time, at least three other sex abuse lawsuits were filed against the Diocese of Erie since July 15, 2020 as well. On August 16, 2020, it was revealed that a total of 21 lawsuits were filed against the Diocese of Erie since the 2018 grand jury report was released.

== Diocese of Pittsburgh lawsuits ==
In January 2020, a lawsuit against the Diocese of Pittsburgh which was filed by sex abuse survivors, as well as their parents, in September 2018 was allowed to move forward. In February 2020, it was reported that the lawsuit didn't involve requests for monetary awards, but rather greater disclosure of sex abuse records. On April 15, 2020, a man filed a lawsuit against the Diocese of Pittsburgh for allegedly shielding priests who sexually abused him as a boy. On August 7, 2020, a new lawsuit was filed against the Diocese of Pittsburgh from a man alleging that Father Leo Burchianti attacked and raped him twice when he was an altar boy. Burchianti, who died in 2013, is also accused of having inappropriate sexual relationships with at least eight boys and was previously mentioned in the state grand jury report. Former Pittsburgh Bishop Cardinal Donald Wuerl and bishop David Zubik have been named as defendants in numerous lawsuits involving the Diocese of Pittsburgh as well.

On August 13, 2020, 25 new sex abuse lawsuits were filed against the Diocese of Pittsburgh.

== Diocese of Greensburg cases and lawsuits ==
In October 2019, an anonymous person, whom convicted Diocese of Greensburg priest John T. Sweeney admitted to sexually abusing, filed a lawsuit against the Diocese of Greensburg, seeking a $1,000,000 settlement. On June 22, 2020, Greensburg Bishop Edward Malesic and the Diocese of Greensburg were both named as defendants in a new sex abuse lawsuit. The lawsuit was filed by a man alleging that both parties covered up reports that former Diocese of Greensburg priest Rev. Joseph L. Sredzinski, who served in Fayette County and died in 2015, started sexually abused him in 1991, when he was 11 years old, and continued doing so until he was 17 years old.

On August 13, 2020, it was revealed that Alan Parker, the same Pittsburgh area lawyer who was involved in 25 lawsuits filed against the Diocese of Pittsburgh, had also filed two new lawsuits against the Diocese of Greensburg as well. On August 26, 2020, a new criminal sex abuse case involving a priest from the Diocese of Greensburg was opened when police arrested Fayette County priest Andrew Kawecki for sexually abusing an altar boy. His arrest warrant was issued by Pennsylvania Attorney General Josh Shapiro.

== Lawsuits against Diocese of Scranton and other Pennsylvania Catholic dioceses ==
On August 14, 2020, it was revealed that there were now 150 lawsuits filed against all eight Pennsylvania Catholic Dioceses. However, the Archdiocese of Philadelphia, Diocese of Pittsburgh, Diocese of Allentown and Diocese of Scranton had received the bulk of these lawsuits. Of these new lawsuits, 30 were filed against the Diocese of Scranton.

== See also ==
- Sexual abuse scandal in the Catholic Archdiocese of Philadelphia
- Roman Catholic Diocese of Altoona-Johnstown#Grand Jury Investigation of Sexual Abuse
