= St. Peter Cathedral (Erie, Pennsylvania) =

Saint Peter Cathedral
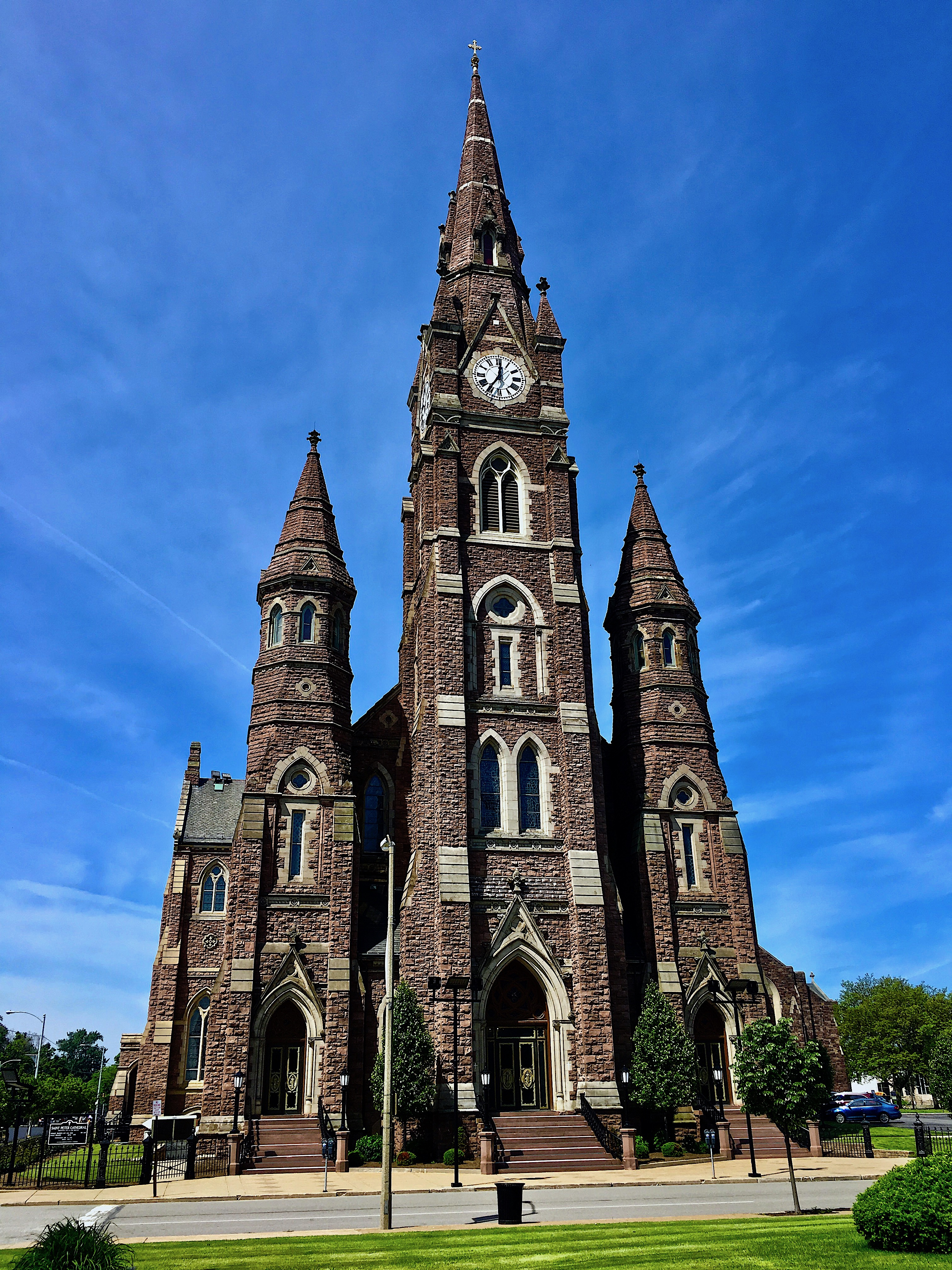

- Location in Pennsylvania Saint Peter Cathedral (the United States)
- 42°7′27″N 80°5′13″W
- Location: 230 West 10th Street; Erie, Pennsylvania
- Country: United States
- Denomination: Roman Catholic
- Website: stpetercathedral.com

History
- Status: Cathedral
- Founded: February 1873
- Dedication: Saint Peter
- Dedicated: August 2, 1893
- Consecrated: May 17, 1911

Architecture
- Functional status: Active
- Architect: Patrick Keely
- Style: Gothic Revival
- Groundbreaking: August 1, 1875
- Construction cost: $274,000

Specifications
- Length: 220 ft (67 m)
- Width: 112 ft (34 m)
- Materials: Sandstone

Administration
- Province: Philadelphia
- Diocese: Erie

Clergy
- Bishop: Most Rev. Lawrence Persico
- Rector: Rev. Michael Ferrick

St. Peter Cathedral is a Roman Catholic cathedral located at 230 West 10th Street in Erie, Pennsylvania, in the United States. It is the see cathedral for the Diocese of Erie.

The cornerstone for St. Peter Cathedral was laid in 1875, but the slow construction schedule meant that it was not dedicated until 1893. The cathedral underwent an interior renovation in 1951 and an exterior renovation in 1984. A second interior renovation took place in 1995.

== History ==
During the early 19th century, St. Patrick's Parish was one of earliest parishes established in Erie. After the Vatican erected the Diocese of Erie in 1853. St Patrick Church became St. Patrick's Pro-Cathedral. As a pro-cathedral, it was intended to be a temporary cathedral until the diocese built a new one.

Bishop Tobias Mullen in 1870 released his plans for the permanent cathedral in Erie. Many thought the structure to be too large for the size of parish, others worried about its cost. Nevertheless, Mullen purchased a property for the cathedral campus for $13,584 and hired the architect Patrick Keeley of Brooklyn to design the building. By the start of construction, Mullen had only $9,000 in his building fund. The cornerstone for the cathedral was laid in 1875 .Mullen decided to avoid borrowing money for the cathedral construction, resulting in a 20-year build time. At one point, he went to court to defeat a move by Erie County to tax the unfinished structure.

On August 1, 1893, St. Peter Cathedral was dedicated as part of a two-day celebration in Erie. Cardinal James Gibbons delivered the homily during the dedication mass. The total project cost was $300,000

Bishop John Edmund Fitzmaurice in 1903 painted the ceiling and purchased bronze bells for the bell tower. Five years later, he paid for the decorating of the sanctuary. That same year, Fitzmaurice purchased a residence adjacent to the cathedral campus to serve as its rectory. The diocese in 1915 installed new pews, statuary and a main altar. In 1916, a private donor purchased a pipe organ for the cathedral that had been constructed for the 1893 World's Columbian Exposition in Chicago, Illinois.

During the 1920s, Bishop John Mark Gannon added new paintings and statues to St. Peter, purchased a new organ console and replaced the flooring. A clock tower was constructed in 1925 and several bronze busts of bishops were commissioned. A new chancel pipe organ was installed in 1938. The cathedral suffered fire damage in the rear of the building in 1938 or 1939. The diocese was forced to repaint and replaster certain areas, as well as to replace some of the wainscotting.

In 1948, Gannon dedicated the Cathedral Preparatory School on the cathedral campus. He also redesigned the Bishop's Crypt in the basement and enlarged the Synod Hall. The diocese in 1965 undertook its first renovation of the cathedral exterior at a cost of $200,000. A water leak in 1976 ruined the 1893 pipe organ, forcing the diocese to replace it the next year.

The cathedral steeple shifted on its base in 1983, forcing the diocese to rebuild it in 1984. At the same time, the diocese restored the entire exterior facade. St. Peter underwent a second major renovation in 1995. The cathedra and baptismal fount were replaced, the interior repainted. Several murals were removed and the side altars converted into shrines. The diocese also installed a new marble floor in the sanctuary.

In August 2025, Daniel Negron was speaking with a priest in the cathedral confessional when he started acting erratically. Brandishing a knife, Negron told onlookers that he wanted to confess a murder, then kill himself. Police later subdued him without anyone being injured. It was subsequently determined that Negron had killed a young woman in a hotel room in Niagara Falls, New York.

== Cathedral exterior ==
=== Facade ===
The cathedral is Gothic Revival in the French Victorian tradition called Second Empire. Much of the stone for the foundation came from dismantling the locks of the Erie Extension Canal, which closed in 1871. The exterior consists of red sandstone from Medina, New York. The white sandstone trim is from Amherst, Ohio, and Mercer County, Pennsylvania.

Carved onto the marble at the front of the church is the seal to the Diocese of Erie. The coats of arms of Pope Leo XIII and Bishop Mullen are on the right; on the left are the coat of arms of Pope John Paul II and Bishop Donald Walter Trautman.

=== Towers ===
The central bell tower stands 265 feet (81 m) tall The two Norman style towers are 150 feet (46 m) each. The bell tower contains a chime of twelve bells weighing 14 tons, cast in 1903 by the Andrew Meneely Bell Foundry of West Troy, New York. The E. Howard Clock Company of Boston installed the clock in the tower later that year.

== Cathedral interior ==
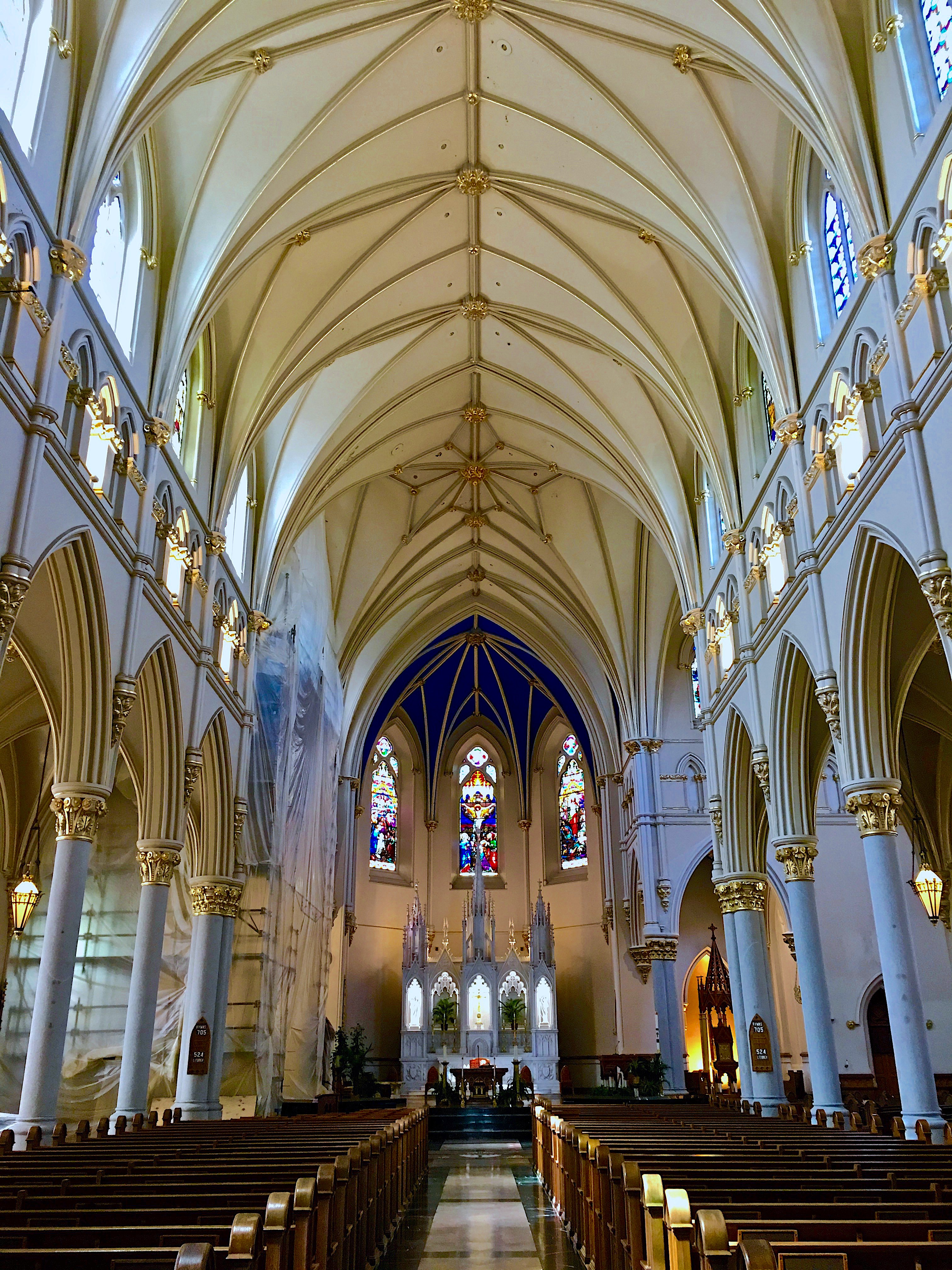
Cathedral interior (2019)

=== Nave ===
From the nave of the church, one can see a collection of the likenesses of the diocese's nine bishops and Auxiliary Bishop Edward P. McManaman, who served as the cathedral rector from 1936 to 1948. The center aisle is composed of Spanish and Italian marble.

The Baptistery is located near the main entrance to the church. It has two pools, one for baptism by immersion, the other by pouring. The fount has blue pearl granite interior with inlaid gold mosaics and an exterior of dark green marble, the same as that used elsewhere in the sanctuary.

Large side windows show the Conferral of Keys to Saint Peter and Jesus' supper at the house of the Publican. There are also stained glass windows of the Life of St. Peter and four of the Western Doctors of the Church. Renovations in 1992-1993 included the resetting of all the stained glass and the installation of many glass prisms to refocus sunlight into the interior.

=== Sanctuary ===
The sanctuary area contains the altar, with the reliquary chest beneath it, and the Bishop's cathedra and the pulpit. The Blessed Sacrament is maintained in the tabernacle on the north side of the cathedral. The marble high altar constructed in 1911 was used until liturgical changes were made after the Second Vatican Council in the 1960s.

The balachin is a wooden canopy that encloses the tabernacle in the sanctuary.Made of oak, the balachin has brass legs trimmed with oak.The reredos is located behind the main altar at the back of the sanctuary. It displays statues of the Apostles Peter and Paul, along with bas-reliefs depicting the sacrifice of Isaac and the story of Melchisedec from the Old Testament. LED lighting was installed on the reredos during the last renovation of the cathedral interior.

The stained glass in the sanctuary and transept was installed by the Franz Mayer firm of Munich, Germany,. It includes the following depictions:

- The Annunciation
- The Birth of Jesus
- The Crucifixion of Jesus
- The Resurrection of Jesus
- The Ascension of Jesus
- The Second Coming of Jesus

=== Pipe organ ===
The pipe organ was built by Casavant Frères of Montreal, Quebec, Canada, and installed in 1977. Additions were made in 1999. It is the third instrument since the building was built.

=== Crypt ===
Completed in 1902, the crypt is located directly beneath the high altar and contains the remains of past bishops of the Diocese of Erie.

As of 2026, seven of bishops of the diocese are laid to rest in the crypt.

- Bishops of Erie
  - Joshua Maria Young
  - Tobias Mullen
  - John Edmund Fitzmaurice
  - John Mark Gannon
  - Alfred Michael Watson
  - Donald Walter Trautman
- Auxiliary Bishop
  - Edward Peter McManaman

== Cathedral Preparatory School ==
The all-boys high school Cathedral Preparatory School is located behind the cathedral. In its early years, classes were held in the cathedral's rooms. The school hosts weekly mass with their student body in the cathedral.

== See also ==
- List of Catholic cathedrals in the United States
- List of cathedrals in the United States
