= John Edmund Fitzmaurice =

American prelate

His Excellency, The Most Reverend John Edmund Fitzmaurice
- Bishop of Erie; Titular Bishop of Amisus
- Church: Roman Catholic Church
- See: Diocese of Erie
- In office: September 15, 1899 – June 18, 1920
- Predecessor: Tobias Mullen
- Successor: John Mark Gannon
- Previous post(s): Coadjutor Bishop of Erie (1898–1899)

Orders
- Ordination: December 21, 1862 by James Frederick Wood
- Consecration: February 24, 1898 by Patrick John Ryan

Personal details
- Born: January 8, 1839; Newtown-Sandes, County Kerry, Ireland
- Died: June 18, 1920 (aged 81); Erie, Pennsylvania, US
- Education: St. Charles Borromeo Seminary

John Edmund Fitzmaurice (January 8, 1839 – June 18, 1920) was an American prelate of the Roman Catholic Church who served as the fourth bishop of the Diocese of Erie in Pennsylvania (1899–1920).

== Biography ==
=== Early life ===
John Fitzmaurice was born on January 8, 1839, in Newtown-Sandes, County Kerry in Ireland. He began studying law at age fifteen. In 1858, he immigrated to the United States, where he began his studies for the priesthood at St. Charles Borromeo Seminary in Philadelphia, Pennsylvania.

Fitzmaurice was ordained to the priesthood by Bishop James Wood on December 21, 1862, and then served as a curate at St. John's and St. Paul's Parishes in Philadelphia. After serving as pastor of St. Agatha's Parish in Philadelphia, he became rector of St. Charles Seminary in 1886. His nephew, Edmond John Fitzmaurice, was also rector of St. Charles (1920–1925) as well as Bishop of Wilmington (1925–1960).

=== Coadjutor Bishop and Bishop of Erie ===
On December 14, 1897, Fitzmaurice was appointed coadjutor bishop of the Diocese of Erie and titular bishop of Amisus by Pope Leo XIII. He received his episcopal consecration on February 24, 1898, from Archbishop Patrick Ryan, with Bishops Ignatius Horstmann and Edmond Prendergast serving as co-consecrators. He succeeded Tobias Mullen as Bishop on September 15, 1899.

During his 21-year-long tenure as bishop, Fitzmaurice established several parishes and dedicated St. Peter's Cathedral in Erie (1911). The Sisters of St. Joseph added an annex to St. Vincent's Hospital in Erie and in 1901 a nursing school.

Toward the end of his life, Fitzmaurice went blind; John Fitzmaurice died June 18, 1920, at age 81 in Erie, Pennsylvania.

Catholic Church titles
New title	— TITULAR — Bishop of Amisus; 1897–1899	Vacant Title next held by Aquilino Ferreyra y Alvarez
Preceded by Tobias Mullen	Bishop of Erie; 1899–1920	Succeeded by John Mark Gannon
