= Edward Peter McManaman =

20th-century American Catholic bishop

Most Reverend Edward P. McManaman
- Auxiliary Bishop of Erie
- Church: Catholic Church
- See: Titular See of Floriana
- Appointed: July 24, 1948
- In office: October 28, 1948 - July 18, 1964

Orders
- Ordination: March 12, 1927
- Consecration: October 28, 1948 by John Mark Gannon

Personal details
- Born: May 3, 1900 Wilkes-Barre, Pennsylvania
- Died: July 18, 1964 (aged 64) Erie, Pennsylvania
- Motto: Christo Servire

Edward Peter McManaman (May 3, 1900 – July 18, 1964) was a bishop of the Catholic Church in the United States. He served as an auxiliary bishop of the Diocese of Erie from 1948 to 1964.

== Biography ==
Born in Wilkes-Barre, Pennsylvania, McManaman studied for the priesthood at the Pontifical North American College in Rome and was ordained a priest there on March 12, 1927. As a priest he served in parish ministry and as the diocesan superintendent of schools. He was named a domestic prelate with the title Monsignor on May 24, 1947.

On July 24, 1948 Pope Pius XII appointed McManaman as the Titular Bishop of Floriana and Auxiliary Bishop of Erie. He was consecrated a bishop in St. Peter's Cathedral in Erie by Bishop John M. Gannon on October 28, 1948. The principal co-consecrators were Bishops William J. Hafey of Scranton and William T. McCarty, C.Ss.R. of Rapid City.

McManaman served as auxiliary bishop until his death on July 18, 1964, at the age of 64.

Catholic Church titles
Preceded by –	Auxiliary Bishop of Erie; 1948 – 1964	Succeeded by –
