= Alfred Michael Watson =

American Catholic bishop (1908–1990)

His Excellency, The Most Reverend Alfred Michael Watson
- Bishop of Erie; Titular Bishop of Nationa
- Church: Roman Catholic
- See: Erie
- In office: 17 March 1969 – 16 July 1982
- Predecessor: John Francis Whealon
- Successor: Michael Joseph Murphy
- Previous posts: Auxiliary Bishop of Erie (1965 to 1969)

Orders
- Ordination: May 10, 1934 by John Mark Gannon
- Consecration: June 29, 1965 by John Krol

Personal details
- Born: July 11, 1908 Erie, Pennsylvania
- Died: January 4, 1990 (aged 81) Erie

Styles of Alfred Michael Watson
- Reference style: His Excellency; The Most Reverend
- Spoken style: Your Excellency
- Religious style: Bishop

Alfred Michael Watson (July 11, 1908 – January 4, 1990) was an American prelate of the Roman Catholic Church who served as the seventh bishop of the Diocese of Erie in Pennsylvania (1969–1982). He previously served as an auxiliary bishop of Erie from 1965 to 1969.

== Biography ==
=== Early life ===
Alfred Watson was born on July 11, 1908, in Erie, Pennsylvania. Watson attended Cathedral Preparatory School in Erie. He was ordained a priest for the Diocese of Erie on May 10, 1934 in Erie by Bishop John Mark Gannon.

=== Auxiliary Bishop and Bishop of Erie ===
On May 17, 1965, Watson was appointed auxiliary bishop of Erie and Titular Bishop of Nationa by Pope Paul VI. He received his episcopal consecration at the Cathedral of Saint Peter in Erie on June 29, 1965. from Cardinal John Krol, with Bishop John Selby Spence and Joseph Francis Donnelly serving as co-consecrators.

Following the promotion of John Francis Whealon to archbishop of Hartford in 1968, Watson was named b bishop of Erie by Paul VI on March 17, 1969. He was accused of being too slow to implement the reforms of the Second Vatican Council, and met considerable opposition from the diocesan clergy. During his tenure, he ordained 88 priests, but was forced to close or merge several Catholic schools.

=== Retirement and death ===
After breaking his hip and undergoing surgery, Watson retired as bishop of Erie on July 16, 1982. He on January 4, 1990 in Erie at age 81.

Catholic Church titles
New title	— TITULAR — Bishop of National; 1965–1969	Vacant Title next held by Francisco Claver
Preceded by John Francis Whealon	Bishop of Erie; 1969–1982	Succeeded by Michael Joseph Murphy
