= Tobias Mullen =

Irish-born clergyman

His Excellency, The Most Reverend Tobias Mullen
- Bishop of Erie
- Church: Roman Catholic Church
- See: Diocese of Erie
- In office: March 3, 1868 – August 10, 1899
- Predecessor: Joshua Maria Young
- Successor: John Edmund Fitzmaurice

Orders
- Ordination: September 1, 1844 by Michael O'Connor
- Consecration: August 2, 1868 by Michael Domenec

Personal details
- Born: March 4, 1818 Urney, County Tyrone, Ireland
- Died: April 22, 1900 (aged 82) Erie, Pennsylvania, US
- Education: Maynooth College

Tobias Mullen (March 4, 1818 – April 22, 1900) was an Irish-born clergyman of the Roman Catholic Church. He served as bishop of the Diocese of Erie in Pennsylvania from 1868 to until his death in 1899.

== Biography ==
=== Early life ===
Tobias Mullen was born on March 4, 1818, in Urney, County Tyrone, in Ireland the youngest of the six sons of James and Mary (née Travers) Mullen. He was educated at Castlefin school in Ulster and at Maynooth College in Maynooth, Ireland, where he studied theology and received minor orders. In 1843, Mullen accepted an invitation from Bishop Michael O'Connor to immigrate to the United States and join the Diocese of Pittsburgh.

=== Priesthood ===
After completing his theological studies, he was ordained to the priesthood for the Diocese of Pittsburgh by Bishop O'Connor on September 1, 1844. He served for about two years as curate at the Cathedral of Pittsburgh, and was afterwards charged with the care of congregations at Johnstown and in Jefferson County. He was transferred to the rectorship of St. Peter's Church at Allegheny in 1854, and served as vicar general of the Diocese of Pittsburgh from 1864 to 1868.

=== Bishop of Erie ===
On March 3, 1868, Mullen was appointed the third Bishop of Erie by Pope Pius IX. He received his episcopal consecration on the following August 2 from Bishop Michael Domenec, with Bishops James Frederick Wood and Louis Amadeus Rappe serving as co-consecrators.

During his 31-year-long administration many priests were ordained, parishes established, churches and schools built, and conferences for the clergy held. He also founded the weekly Lake Shore Visitor, an orphanage, and two hospitals. His greatest accomplishment was the erection of St. Peter's Cathedral. Originally dubbed as "Mullen's Folly", its cornerstone was laid in 1875 and it was later dedicated in 1893. Mullen suffered a paralytic stroke on May 20, 1897. He received John Fitzmaurice as his coadjutor bishop in 1898.

Tobias Mullen remained in ill health until his death at on April 22, 1900, at age 82.

Catholic Church titles
Preceded by Joshua Maria Young	Bishop of Erie; 1868–1899	Succeeded by John Edmund Fitzmaurice
Vacant Title last held by Augustin Dontenwill	— TITULAR — Bishop of Germanicopolis; 1889–1900	Vacant Title next held by Joseph Maria Koudelka
