= Michael Joseph Murphy =

American Catholic bishop

His Excellency, The Most Reverend Michael Joseph Murphy
- Bishop of Erie; Titular Bishop of Arindela
- Church: Catholic
- See: Diocese of Erie
- In office: July 16, 1982 – June 2, 1990
- Predecessor: Alfred Michael Watson
- Successor: Donald Walter Trautman
- Previous posts: Auxiliary Bishop of Cleveland (1976 to 1978); Coadjutor Bishop of Erie (1978 to 1982)

Orders
- Ordination: February 28, 1942 by James A. McFadden
- Consecration: June 11, 1976 by James Aloysius Hickey

Personal details
- Born: July 1, 1915 Cleveland, Ohio, US
- Died: April 3, 2007 (aged 91) Erie, Pennsylvania, US

Styles of Michael Joseph Murphy
- Reference style: His Excellency; The Most Reverend
- Spoken style: Your Excellency
- Religious style: Bishop

Michael Joseph Murphy (July 1, 1915 – April 3, 2007) was an American prelate of the Catholic Church. He served as bishop of Erie in Pennsylvania, from 1982 to 1990. He previously served as coadjutor bishop of Erie from 1978 to 1982 and as an auxiliary bishop of the Diocese of Cleveland in Ohio from 1976 to 1878.

== Early life and education ==
Michael Murphy was born on July 1, 1915, in Cleveland, Ohio, the only child of William and Mary Bridget (née Patton) Murphy. His father was a first-generation Irish American whereas his mother was an immigrant from Achill Island, County Mayo in Ireland. Michael attended St. Rose and St. James Grade Schools in Cleveland, and graduated from Cathedral Latin High School in 1933. After attending Niagara University in Lewiston, New York, for two years, he began his studies for the priesthood at St. Mary's Seminary in Cleveland in 1935. Murphy later recalled,

"I can't think of ever having had another vocational aspiration than the priesthood. And from the earliest years of grade school, my mother used to recall that as a youngster I would, coming back from church, offer a Mass of my own using a bath towel or something as a chasuble and that sort of routine."

After finishing at St. Mary's, Murphy went to Rome to further his studies at the Pontifical North American College and Pontifical Gregorian University. He obtained a Bachelor of Arts degree in philosophy were interrupted in 1940 by World War II. Returning to the United States, Murphy entered the Theological College of the Catholic University of America in Washington, D.C. He there earned a Licentiate of Sacred Theology in 1942.

== Priesthood ==
On February 28,1942, Murphy was ordained a priest for the Diocese of Cleveland by Bishop James McFadden at the Cathedral of St. John the Evangelist in Cleveland Following his ordination, the diocese sent Murphy back to Catholic University to complete his graduate studies. He was appointed to the faculty of St. Mary's Seminary as professor of moral and pastoral theology in 1943, becoming dean of students in 1944 and vice-rector in 1948. He served as rector of St. Mary's from 1963 to 1976.

== Episcopal ministry ==
=== Auxiliary Bishop of Cleveland ===
On April 20, 1976, Murphy was appointed auxiliary bishop of Cleveland and titular bishop of Arindela by Pope Paul VI. He received his episcopal consecration on June 11, 1976, from Bishop James Hickey, with Archbishop Joseph Bernardin and Bishop Clarence Issenmann serving as co-consecrators. He selected as his episcopal motto: "Peace and Compassion". As an auxiliary bishop, he served as episcopal vicar for Summit County with residence in Akron.

=== Coadjutor Bishop of Erie ===
Murphy was named coadjutor bishop of Erie on November 20, 1978; he was only the third American appointment of the newly elected Pope John Paul II. He was installed in Erie, Pennsylvania, on December 27, 1978. Murphy soon visited every parish in the diocese. He reorganized the diocesan administration to improve pastoral service to Catholics, delegating some of the bishop's authority and allowing more participation of religious and laity.

Murphy's 1980 pastoral letter on marriage served as the basis for the diocesan policy on marriage preparation. Murphy was called to the Vatican that same year for a series of meetings with John Paul II to discuss American Catholic seminaries, having spent most of his priesthood as teacher and rector at St. Mary's Seminary. Besides regrouping diocesan offices, he created four vicariates in 1981.

=== Bishop of Erie ===
Upon Watson's retirement, Murphy succeeded him as the eighth bishop of Erie on July 16, 1982. He founded the Emmaus Program, an annual convocation of diocesan clergy for their continuing education and spiritual formation, in 1983. In 1984, he announced a three-year plan to raise $9 million to cover diocesan expenses, including educational and social needs and the renovation of St. Peter Cathedral; the appeal raised over $14 million in pledges. In 1985, Murphy launched a spiritual growth process called RENEW, which attracted the participation of more than 20,000 people throughout the diocese and lasted until 1988. He established St. Mark Catholic Center and the Diocesan Committee on Human Sexuality in 1987 and, upon the advice of pastors, principals and parish leaders, he merged several parishes and closed one school in 1989.

==== Handling of Sex Abuse ====
In a grand jury report released by Pennsylvania Attorney General Josh Shapiro, Murphy was criticized allowing "predator priest" Chester Gawronski to remain in the Erie Diocese after he received reports that Gawronski was sexually abusing children. Both Murphy and his successor Donald Trautman often reassigned Gawronski to different parishes between 1987 and 2002. An allegation of sexual abuse against Erie priest William Presley, who was transferred to the Diocese of Harrisburg in 1986, had also been reported to the diocese by his male accuser in 1982, 1987, and 2002.

== Later life and death ==
Approaching the mandatory retirement age of 75, Murphy resigned as bishop of Erie on June 2, 1990, after an eight-year-long tenure. He spent his 16 years of retirement at St. Patrick Parish in Erie. He died on April 3, 2007 at the infirmary of the Sisters of Mercy Motherhouse in Erie, at age 91.

== Viewpoints ==
A promoter of the consistent life ethic, Murphy opposed both abortion and the death penalty. He wrote an open letter to Pennsylvania Governor Dick Thornburgh in 1986 voicing his opposition to the death penalty, saying,

"We are disappointed, frightened, angered even to the point of vengeance when the lives of others become so warped and twisted that they have become destructive of life itself. We wonder why the gift of life was given to them. But the gift is not ours. Neither is it ours to say, 'They do not deserve to live!'"

In a 1989 Christmas message, Murphy declared,

"As a means to the peace which He promises us and indeed has made possible for us, may the Prince of Peace gift all of us and our nation with a real awareness of the sacredness of all human life, unborn no less than born."

Catholic Church titles
Vacant Title last held by Antônio Ribeiro de Oliveira	— TITULAR — Bishop of Arindela; 1976–1978	Vacant Title next held by José Rafael Barquero Arce
Preceded by Alfred Michael Watson	Bishop of Erie; 1982–1990	Succeeded by Donald Walter Trautman
