= John Mark Gannon =

American bishop (1877–1968)

His Excellency The Most Reverend John Mark Gannon
- Titular Archbishop of Tacarata; Bishop of Erie; Titular Bishop of Nilopolis
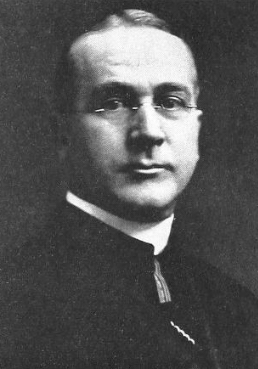
- See: Diocese of Erie
- Installed: December 16, 1920
- Term ended: December 9, 1966
- Predecessor: John Edmund Fitzmaurice
- Successor: John Francis Whealon
- Other posts: Auxiliary Bishop of Erie (1918-1920)

Orders
- Ordination: December 21, 1901
- Consecration: February 6, 1918

Personal details
- Born: June 12, 1877 Erie, Pennsylvania, US
- Died: September 5, 1968 (aged 91) Erie, Pennsylvania, US
- Denomination: Roman Catholic
- Motto: Ut diligatis invicem

Ordination history of John Mark Gannon
History
Episcopal consecration
- Consecrated by: Michael John Hoban (Scranton)
Episcopal succession
Bishops consecrated by John Mark Gannon as principal consecrator
- Edward Peter McManaman: October 28, 1948

Styles of John Mark Gannon
- Reference style: His Excellency; The Most Reverend
- Spoken style: Your Excellency
- Religious style: Bishop

John Mark Gannon (June 12, 1877 – September 5, 1968) was an American Catholic prelate who served as Bishop of Erie from 1920 to 1966 and was given the personal title of "archbishop" in 1953. He previously served as an auxiliary bishop of the same diocese from 1918 to 1920.

== Biography ==
=== Early life ===
John Gannon was born in Erie, Pennsylvania, to Thomas Patrick and Julia (née Dunlavey) Gannon. His uncle was professional baseball player Gussie Gannon.

John Gannon attended St. Bonaventure's College in St. Bonaventure, New York, where he earned a Bachelor of Arts degree in 1899. He continued his studies at the Catholic University of America in Washington, D.C., earning a Bachelor of Sacred Theology degree (1900) and a Licentiate of Sacred Theology (1901).

=== Priesthood ===
Gannon was ordained to the priesthood for the Diocese of Erie on December 21, 1901. In 1903, he earned Doctor of Divinity and Doctor of Canon Law degrees from the Apollinare University in Rome. Returning to Erie, he held pastorates in McKean, Oil City, Cambridge Springs, and Meadville, all in Pennsylvania. Gannon became superintendent of diocesan schools in 1912.

=== Auxiliary Bishop of Erie ===
On November 13, 1917, Gannon was appointed auxiliary bishop of Erie and Titular Bishop of Nilopolis by Pope Benedict XV. He was the first native of Erie to be appointed a bishop. He received his episcopal consecration on February 6, 1918, from Bishop Michael John Hoban, with Bishops Philip R. McDevitt and John Joseph McCort serving as co-consecrators. In addition to his episcopal duties, Gannon continued to serve as superintendent of schools and was pastor of St. Andrew's Parish.

=== Bishop of Erie ===
Following the death of Bishop John Fitzmaurice, Gannon was named the fifth bishop of Erie by Benedict XV on August 26, 1920. His installation took place on December 16, 1920, at St. Peter's Cathedral.

Gannon founded Cathedral Preparatory School in Erie in 1921, and encouraged the establishment of Villa Maria College in Buffalo, New York, and Mercyhurst College in Erie In 1933, he established Cathedral College, a two-year institution. Religious education programs under the auspices of the Confraternity of Christian Doctrine were organized in every part of the diocese, and he founded five regional high schools after age 80 alone. He laid the cornerstone for St. Joseph's Home for Children in 1923, and founded Spencer Hospital in Meadville, St. Vincent's Hospital in Erie, Andrew Kaul Memorial Hospital in St. Marys, Pennsylvania, St. Mary's Home in Erie; Harborcreek Training School for Boys in Erie, Gannondale for Girls in Erie, and the Erie Day Nursery. He also erected twenty-eight parishes, forty-nine churches, seven rectories, and twelve convents.

In 1937, Gannon became head of the committee of American bishops that founded Montezuma Seminary in New Mexico to train Mexicans for the ministry. He was the episcopal moderator of the Catholic Press Association from 1937 to 1944, and was treasurer of the National Catholic Welfare Conference from 1944 to 1950. He also served as chair of the Commission for the Canonization of the Martyrs of the United States, and was the personal representative of the American hierarchy at the Eucharistic Congress in Brazil and at the fiftieth anniversary celebration of the pontifical coronation of the image of Our Lady of Guadalupe.

In 1938, Gannon went to Spain to conduct his own investigation of reports of atrocities and persecution of the Catholic Church by the Loyalist Government. On his return, he declared, "Communist cruelty and slaughter had consigned more than 11,000 of the Spanish priests and seminarians to martyrs' graves." He founded Noticias Católicas, a news service for Spanish- and Portuguese-speaking countries.

Gannon was given the personal title of archbishop by Pope Pius XII on November 25, 1953. Between 1962 and 1965, he attended all four sessions of the Second Vatican Council.

=== Retirement and legacy ===
Pope Paul VI accepted Gannon's resignation as bishop of Erie on December 9, 1966; he was appointed Titular Archbishop of Tacarata on the same date. John Gannon died in Erie on September 5, 1968, at age 91. He is buried in the crypt of St. Peter Catheral.

After his death, Cathedral College was renamed Gannon College; the college later became a university, in 1979. Its Archbishop John Mark Gannon Award is presented to students who have attained the highest grade point average upon graduation.

Catholic Church titles
Vacant Title last held by Juan Bautista Gorordo	— TITULAR — Bishop of Nilopolis; 1917–1920	Vacant Title next held by Francisco Javier Baztán y Urniza
Preceded by John Edmund Fitzmaurice	Bishop of Erie; 1920–1966	Succeeded by John Francis Whealon
