= Diocese of Erie =

Latin Catholic jurisdiction in the US

Diocese of Erie Diocesis Eriensis
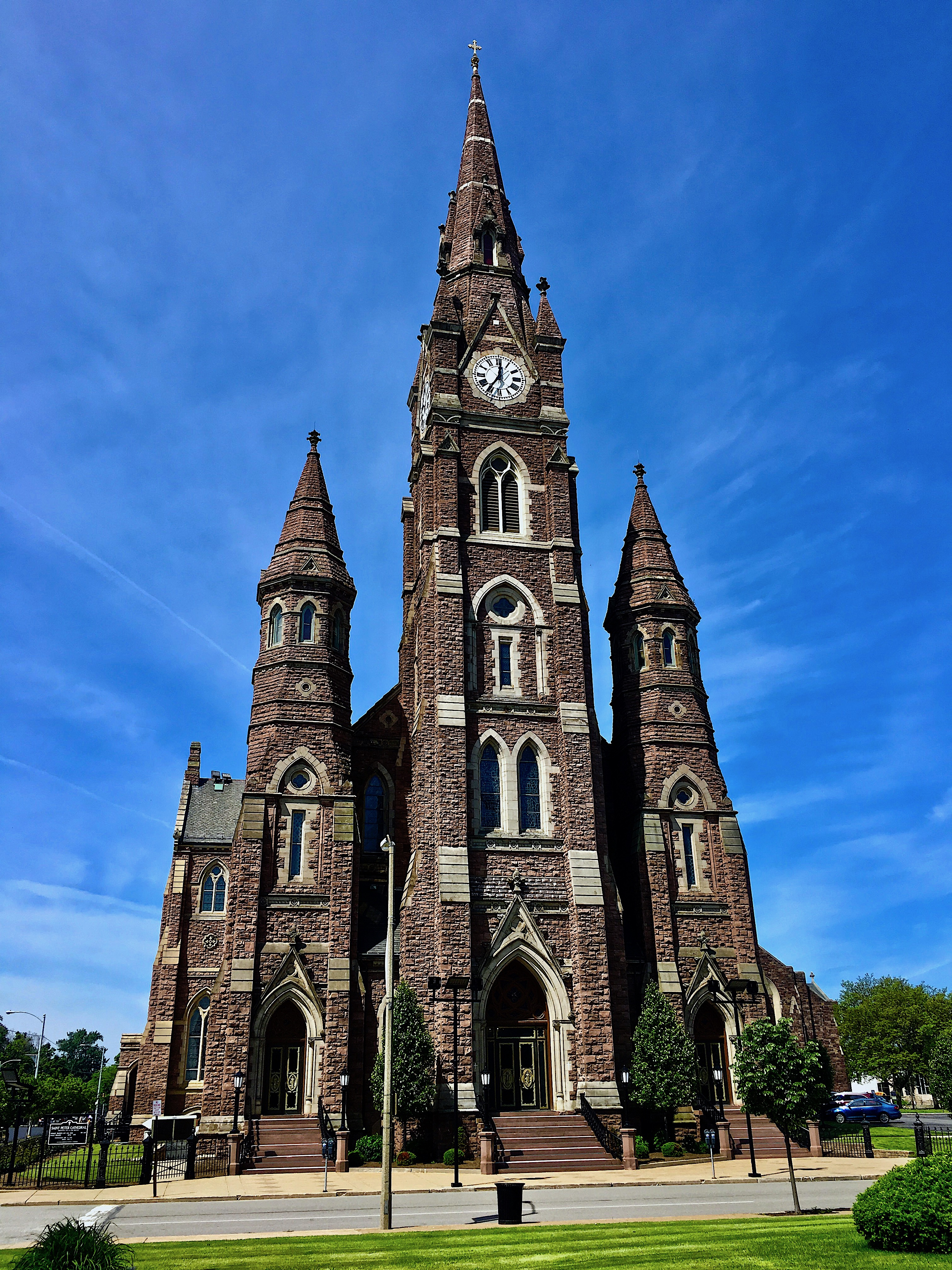
- St. Peter Cathedral

- Coat of Arms of the Diocese of Erie

Location
- Country: United States
- Ecclesiastical province: Archdiocese of Philadelphia
- Coordinates: 42°07′27″N 80°05′13″W

Statistics
- Area: 10,167 sq mi (26,330 km^{2})
- Population: Total; Catholics: (as of 2021); 813,513; 195,243 (24%)
- Parishes: 96
- Churches: 120

Information
- Denomination: Catholic
- Sui iuris church: Latin Church
- Rite: Roman Rite
- Established: July 29, 1853
- Cathedral: St. Peter Cathedral
- Patron saint: St. Patrick
- Secular priests: 169

Current leadership
- Pope: Leo XIV
- Bishop: Lawrence T. Persico
- Metropolitan Archbishop: Nelson J. Perez

Map
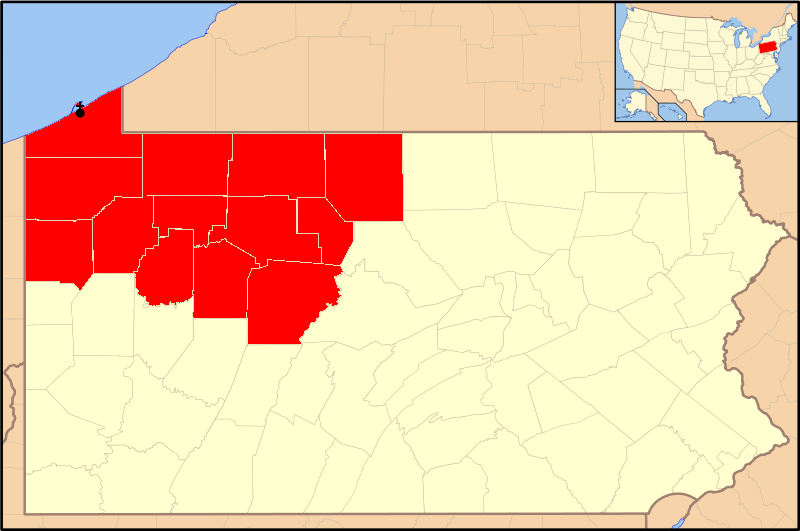
- Location of the Diocese of Erie in Pennsylvania

Website
- eriercd.org

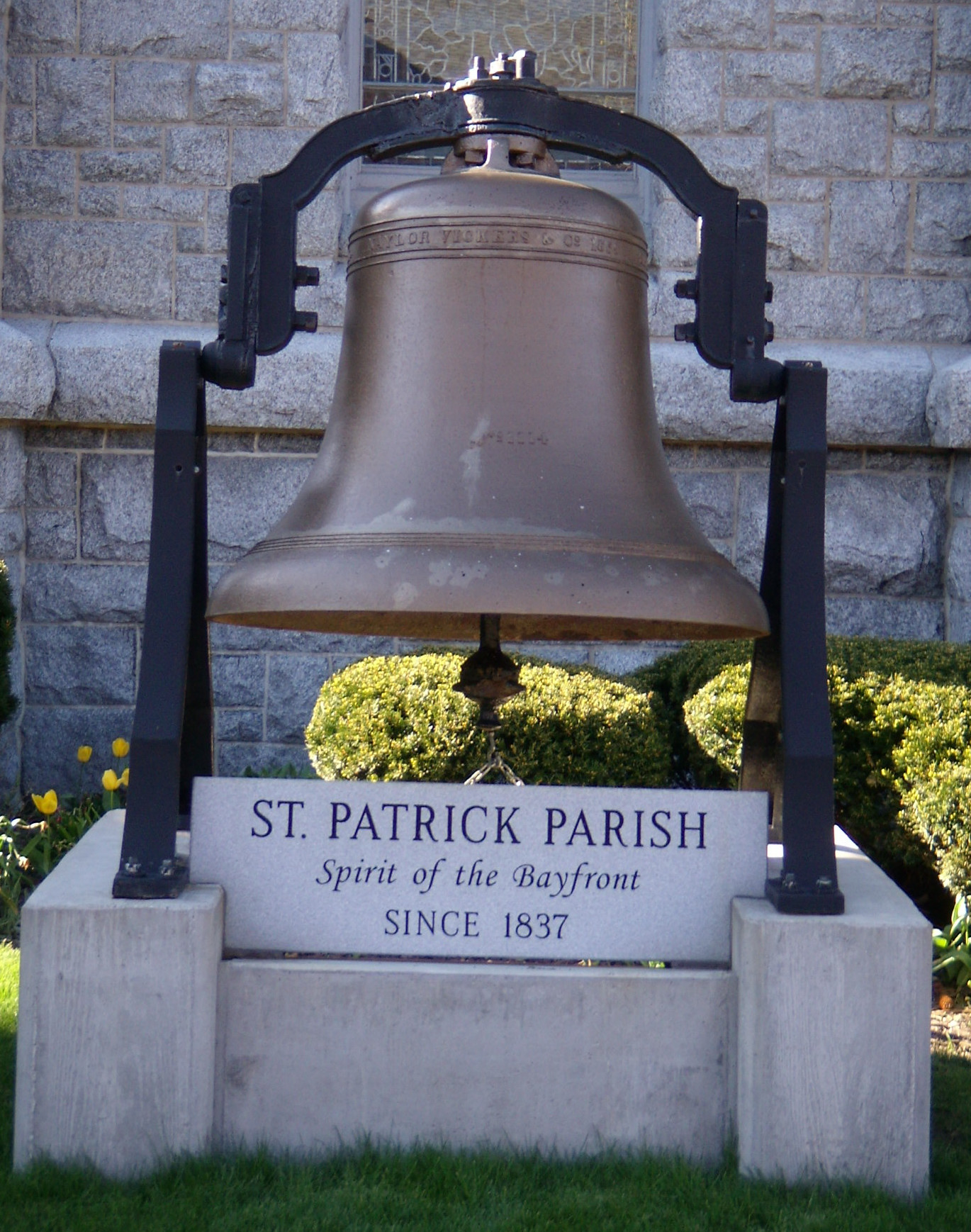
Bell from St. Patrick Church, Erie, Pennsylvania (2007)

The Diocese of Erie (Latin: Dioecesis Eriensis) is a diocese of the Catholic Church in western Pennsylvania in the United States founded in 1853. It is a suffragan diocese of the metropolitan Archdiocese of Philadelphia. Its mother church is St. Peter's Cathedral in Erie.

== Statistics ==
The Diocese of Erie is geographically the largest diocese in Pennsylvania, covering 10,167 square miles (26,332.41 km^{2}). It covers 13 counties in Northwestern Pennsylvania. About 220,000 Catholics (74,000 families) reside in the diocese. The diocese educates approximately 14,000 children and youth.

== History ==
=== 1700 to 1853 ===
Unlike the other British colonies in America, the Province of Pennsylvania did not ban Catholics from the colony or threaten priests with imprisonment. However, the colony did require any Catholics seeking public office to take an oath to Protestantism. In 1784, a year after the end of the American Revolution, Pope Pius VI erected the Apostolic Prefecture of United States of America, including all of the new United States.

In 1789, Pius VI converted the prefecture to the Diocese of Baltimore, covering all of the United States. With the passage of the US Bill of Rights in 1791, Catholics received full freedom of worship.

In 1808, Pope Pius VII erected the Diocese of Philadelphia, covering all of Pennsylvania. As the Catholic population grew in Pennsylvania in the 19th century, the Vatican erected the Diocese of Pittsburgh in 1843 to cover the northwestern part of the state.

=== 1853 to 1868 ===
On July 29, 1853, Bishop Michael O'Connor of the Diocese of Pittsburgh was appointed as the first bishop of the new Diocese of Erie by Pope Pius IX. The dividing line of the new diocese ran east and west along the northern boundaries of Cambria, Indiana, Armstrong, Butler, and Lawrence Counties, giving it 13 northern counties.

The pope named Joshua Young as the new bishop of Pittsburgh. However, Young did not want the job in Pittsburgh. In addition, a group of Pittsburgh Catholics petitioned the pope to bring O'Connor back to Pittsburgh. Five months later, the Vatican changed course, returning O'Connor to Pittsburgh and making Young the second bishop of Erie.

Due to the 1859 discovery of oil in Titusville and the ensuring oil rush, Young was forced to erect numerous churches to accommodate the new Catholic settlers along Oil Creek and the Allegheny River. At the beginning of Young's tenure, the diocese contained 28 churches and 14 priests, He established several Catholic schools and orphanages, and a hospital. He also introduced into the diocese the Sisters of St. Joseph from Buffalo, New York. In 1864, the sisters opened the St. Joseph's Orphan Asylum in Erie.By the time of Young's death in 1866, the number of churches and priests in the diocese were both over 50.

=== 1868 to 1920 ===
In 1868, Monsignor Tobia Mullen of Pittsburgh was appointed the third bishop of Erie by Pope Pius IX. He founded the weekly Lake Shore Visitor newspaper, an orphanage, and two hospitals. His greatest accomplishment was the erection of St. Peter's Cathedral. Originally dubbed as "Mullen's Folly", its cornerstone was laid in 1875 and Mullen dedicated it in 1893.

The Sisters of St. Joseph established Villa Maria Academy for girls in Erie in 1892; it became Gannon University in 1944.After Mullen suffered a cerebral hemorrhage in 1897, Pope Leo XIII named John Fitzmaurice of Philadelphia as coadjutor bishop to assist Mullen.

After Mullen died in 1899, Fitzmaurice automatically succeeded him as the next bishop of Erie. During his 21-year-long tenure as bishop, Fitzmaurice established several parishes and dedicated St. Peter's Cathedral in Erie (1911). The Sisters of St. Joseph added an annex to St. Vincent's Hospital in Erie and in 1901 a nursing school. Fitzmaurice died in 1920.

=== 1920 to 1980 ===
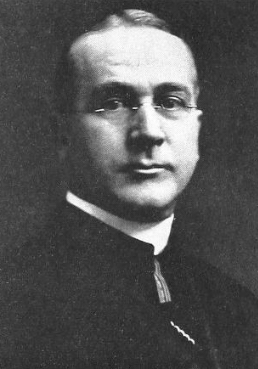
Bishop Gannon (1923)

The next bishop of Erie was Auxiliary Bishop John Gannon of Erie, named by Pope Benedict XV in 1920. Gannon founded Cathedral Preparatory School in Erie in 1921.

The Sisters of Mercy founded Mercyhurst College for women in Erie in 1926; it is today Mercyhurst University. In 1933, he established Cathedral College, a two-year institution. Gannon organized religious education programs under the auspices of the Confraternity of Christian Doctrine in the diocese and founded five regional high schools. The diocese opened the Erie Day Nursery in Erie in 1929. The Benedictine Sisters of Erie in 1933 took over the operation of the Andrew Kaul Memorial Hospital in St. Marys; It is today the Penn Highlands Elk Hospital. The Sisters of Our Lady of Charity in 1934 opened the Gannondale School for Girls in Erie. By the time Gannon retired in 1966, he had erected 28 parishes, 49 churches, seven rectories, and 12 convents.

To replace Gannon, Pope Paul VI in 1966 named Auxiliary Bishop John Whealon from the Diocese of Cleveland as bishop of Erie. However, after only two years in Erie, Paul VI appointed Whealon as archbishop of the Archdiocese of Hartford. The pope then appointed Auxiliary Bishop Alfred Watson from Erie as its next bishop. Critics accused Watson of being too slow to implement the reforms of the Second Vatican Council of the early 1960s and he met considerable opposition from the diocesan clergy. During his tenure, Watson ordained 88 priests, but was forced to close or merge several Catholic schools.

Pope John Paul II named Auxiliary Bishop Michael Murphy of the Diocese of Cleveland as a coadjutor bishop in Erie in 1978. Murphy soon visited every parish in the diocese and reorganized the diocesan administration to improve pastoral service to Catholics. He delegated some of his authority, allowing more participation in diocesan affairs of the religious sisters and the laity.

=== 1980 to present ===
When Watson retired in 1982, Murphy became the new bishop. He founded the Emmaus Program, an annual convocation of diocesan clergy in 1983. In 1984, Murphy announced a three-year plan to raise $9 million to cover diocesan expenses, including educational and social needs and the renovation of St. Peter Cathedral; the appeal raised over $14 million in pledges. In 1985, Murphy launched a spiritual growth process called RENEW, which attracted the participation of more than 20,000 people throughout the diocese and lasted until 1988. He established the St. Mark Catholic Center in Erie and the diocesan Committee on Human Sexuality in 1987. Murphy merged several parishes and closed one school in 1989. He retired in 1990.

John Paul II appointed Auxiliary Bishop Donald Trautman of the Diocese of Buffalo as bishop of Erie in 1990. As bishop, he improved the diocesan youth and vocational programs, renovated the interior of St. Peter Cathedral, and established a diocesan Deposit and Loan Fund and a retirement home for clergy named after Murphy. Trautman retired in 2011. As of 2026, the current bishop of Erie is Lawrence T. Persico from the Diocese of Greensburg, named by Pope Benedict XVI in 2012.

== Reports of sexual abuse ==
=== Gawronski case ===
Sean O'Hara reported to the diocese in April 2002 that he had been sexually assaulted by Chester Gawronski, a parish priest, in 1977. O'Hara said that when he told his father, Donald O'Hara, about the assaults in 1984, Donald immediately reported the allegations to the diocese. A diocesan official said that Gawronski would receive treatment and be restricted from minors in the future. The official asked the O'Hara family to keep discretion.

The 2018 Pennsylvania grand jury report criticized Bishops Trautman and Murphy for allowing Gawronski to remain in ministry despite numerous allegations of sexual abuse. Gawronski had been reassigned multiple times between 1987 and 2002, and Trautman renewed Gawronski's five-year term as a chaplain in St Mary's Home in Erie in 2001. In his own defense, Trautman noted that he had set guidelines in 1993 on handling sexual abuse and established the diocesan Office for the Protection of Children and Youth in 2003. Gawronski was laicized in 2006.

=== Presley case ===
Also in April 2002, three individuals accused William Presley, a parish priest, of physical and sexual abuse when they were minors between 1963 and 1974. The victims said that Presley would punch and slap them as well as force them into sodomy and oral sex. After Presley admitted to sexually abuse, Trautman permanently removed him from ministry. In 1987, two different victims had approached the diocese with similar complaints about Presley. Conceding that Presley had violent tendencies, the diocese sent him in 1990 to a psychologist for evaluation. After the evaluation, the diocese returned Presley to ministry.

In 2005, the Vatican tasked Bishop Mark Bartchak of the Diocese of Altoona-Johnstown, who had served as a priest in Erie, with investigating Presley. During his investigation, Bartchak continuously re-interviewed a male victim who had made allegations about Presley in 1982, 1987 and 2002. In August 2005, Bartchak sent a secret memo to Trautman. Parts of the memo read

"I was not surprised to learn from other witnesses from the Elk County area, that there are likely to be other victims" and that "it is likely that there may be others who were also of the age for the offenses to be considered delicts, but to what end is it necessary to follow every lead?"

Bartchak stated in another memo, following a meeting with Trautman on August 29, 2005:

"Bishop Trautman decided that in order to preclude further scandal, these additional witnesses should not be contacted, especially given the fact that it is not likely that they will lead to information concerning delicts involving minors under 16 years of age."

The 2018 grand jury report criticized Bartchak for how he interviewed the Presley's victim and for his communications with Trautman.

=== Grand jury report ===
In early 2016, Pennsylvania Attorney General Josh Shapiro convened a special grand jury to investigate allegations of sexual abuse of minors by Catholic clergy in six Pennsylvania dioceses, including the Diocese of Erie. In April 2018, the diocese published a list of 34 priests and 17 laypeople who had been credibly accused of sexually abusing children. By July 2018, the list had grown to 64 names.

In August 2018, the Pennsylvania grand jury report was released, revealing 41 clergy in the Diocese of Erie with credible accusations of sexually abusing children. The report praised Bishop Persico, who acknowledged there had been a cover-up of sexual abuse crimes in the diocese.

In October 2018, David Lee Poulson, a diocesan priest, pleaded guilty to charges of corruption of minors and endangering the welfare of children. Poulson had been accused of repeatedly sexually abusing one boy and attempting to sexually abuse another. In January 2019, Poulson received a two-and-a-half to 14-year prison sentence. In March 2019, the Vatican laicized Poulson.

== Bishops ==
=== Bishops of Erie ===
1. Michael O'Connor (1853–1854), appointed Bishop of Pittsburgh
2. Joshua Maria Young (1854–1866)
3. Tobias Mullen (1868–1899)
4. John Edmund Fitzmaurice (1899–1920)
5. John Mark Gannon (1920–1966), elevated to Archbishop (ad personam) in 1953
6. John Francis Whealon (1966–1968), appointed Archbishop of Hartford
7. Alfred Michael Watson (1969–1982)
8. Michael Joseph Murphy (1982–1990)
9. Donald Walter Trautman (1990–2012)
10. Lawrence T. Persico (2012–present)

=== Auxiliary bishops ===
- John Mark Gannon (1917–1920), appointed Bishop of Erie
- Edward Peter McManaman (1948–1964)
- Alfred Michael Watson (1965–1969), appointed Bishop of Erie

=== Other diocesan priests who became bishops ===
- Thomas Francis Brennan, appointed Bishop of Dallas in 1891
- Lawrence Eugene Brandt, appointed Bishop of Greensburg in 2004
- Richard Thomas Guilfoyle, appointed Bishop of Altoona in 1936
- Mark Leonard Bartchak, appointed Bishop of Altoona-Johnstown in 2011
- Edward M. Lohse, appointed Bishop of Kalamazoo (Michigan) in 2023

== Vicariates ==
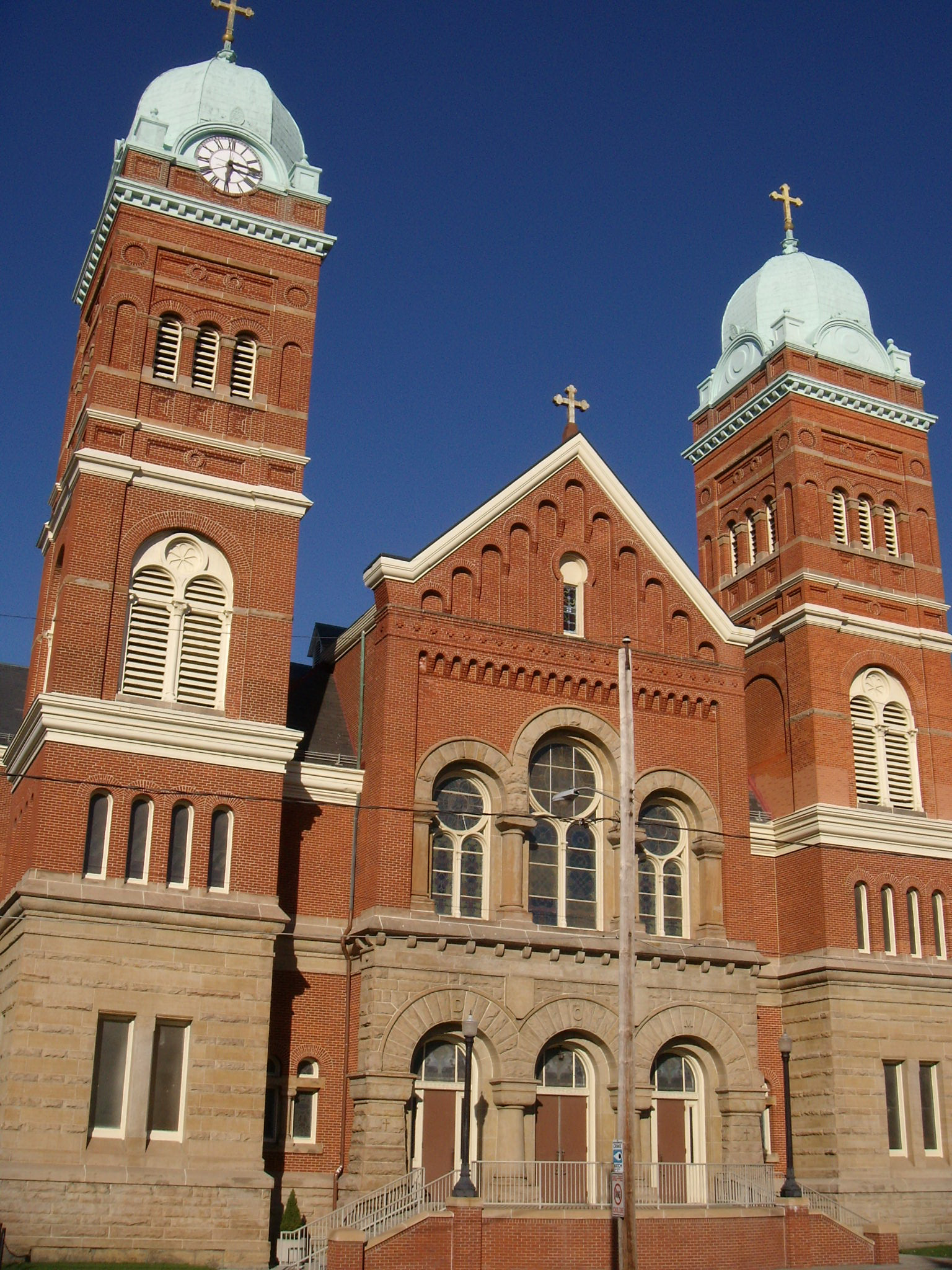
St. Stanislaus Church, Erie, Pennsylvania (2007)

The Diocese of Erie is divided into three vicariates:

=== Eastern Vicariate ===
- Parishes in Cameron, Clearfield, Elk, Jefferson, McKean, and Potter counties
- Deaneries at Bradford, Clearfield, Dubois, and St. Mary's

=== Northern Vicariate ===
- Parishes in Erie, part of Forest and Warren counties
- Erie East and Erie West deaneries in Erie and a deanery in Warren

=== Western Vicariate ===
- Parishes in Clarion, Crawford, part of Forest, Mercer, and Venango counties
- Deaneries in Meadville, Oil City, and Sharon

== Parishes ==
As of 2026, the Diocese of Erie has 76 parishes with 77 active diocesan priests and 58 permanent deacons. Its historically significant parishes include:

Church	Dedication	Location	History
St. Mary (closed)	1840	Erie	First church built in 1839 by German immigrants, second church dedicated in 1885. Church closed in 2015, parish merged with St. Stanislaus
St. Philip	1847	Crossingville	First mass celebrated in 1807. Current church dedicated in 1847. Parish merged in 2007 into Saint Lawrence the Martyr in Albion.
St. Mary	1853	St. Marys	Parish founded in 1842 by German immigrants from Bavaria First church constructed in 1845, current church dedicated in 1853.
St. Stanislaus	1885	Erie	Founded by Polish immigrants in 1886
St. Francis Assisi	1886	Clearfield	First church dedicated in 1832. Current church dedicated in 1886.
St. Michael the Archangel	1887	Fryburg	Founded in 1836 by German Catholics, current church completed in 1887
St. Hippolyte	1888	Frenchtown	Parish founded in 1834, current church dedicated in 1888
St. Nicholas of Tolentino	1893	Crates	Founded as a parish in 1828, first church dedicated by Kenrick in 1835. Current church dedicated in 1893. Now a mission church of St. Charles Parish in New Bethlehem.
St. Peter Cathedral	1893	Erie	Cathedral dedicated in 1893
St. Patrick	1903	Erie	First church built in 1837, current church built in 1903. Served as co-cathedral from 1852 to 1983
St. Andrew	1916	Erie	Parish founded in 1871, current church completed in 1916.

== Education ==
As of 2026, the Diocese of Erie has 28 schools with an approximate enrollment of 4,300 students. Unlike other dioceses, the Diocese of Erie does not operate a central school system.

=== School systems ===
Many of the dozens of schools in the diocese are run by independent school systems, some are run by parishes.

=== Universities ===
Gannon University – Erie

== Cemeteries ==
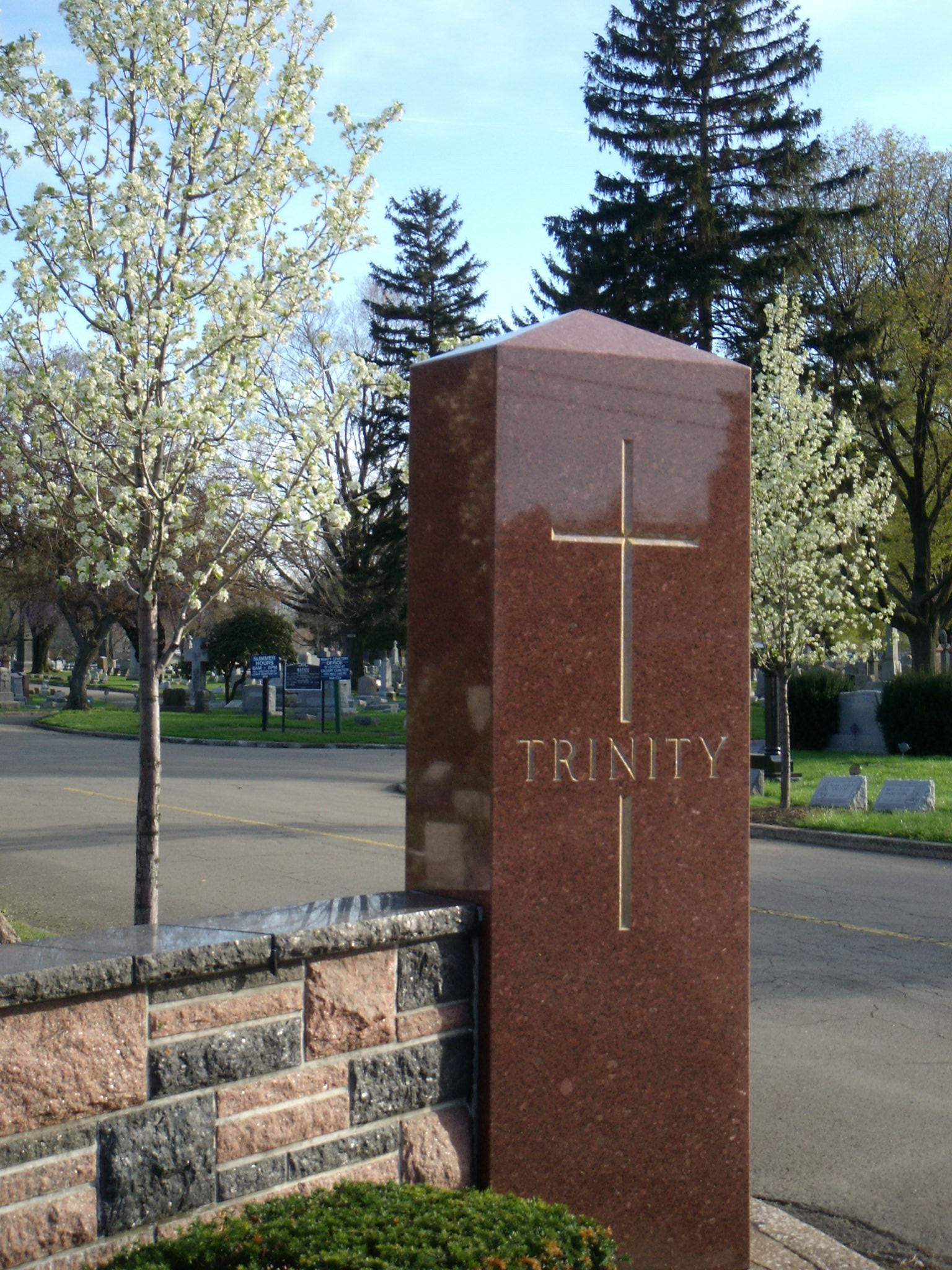
Trinity Cemetery, Erie, Pennsylvania (2007)

Erie Diocesan Cemeteries operates the following cemeteries, all in the City of Erie:

- Calvary Cemetery and Mausoleum
- Gate of Heaven Cemetery and Mausoleum
- Mary, Queen of Peace Cemetery
- Trinity Cemetery
