= Lawrence T. Persico =

American prelate

His Excellency, The Most Reverend Lawrence T. Persico
- Bishop of Erie
- Diocese: Erie
- Appointed: July 31, 2012
- Installed: October 1, 2012
- Predecessor: Donald Walter Trautman
- Previous post: Vicar General of the Diocese of Greensburg

Orders
- Ordination: April 30, 1977 by William G. Connare
- Consecration: October 1, 2012 by Charles J. Chaput, Donald Walter Trautman, and Lawrence Eugene Brandt

Personal details
- Born: November 21, 1950 (age 75) Monessen, Pennsylvania, U.S.
- Denomination: Catholic
- Education: St. Pius X Seminary; Saint Vincent Seminary; Catholic University of America
- Motto: Veritas in caritate (Truth in charity)

Styles of Lawrence T. Persico
- Reference style: His Excellency; The Most Reverend
- Spoken style: Your Excellency
- Religious style: Bishop

Lawrence Thomas Persico (born November 21, 1950) is an American Catholic prelate who has served as Bishop of Erie since 2012.

== Biography ==
=== Early life ===
Lawrence Persico was born on November 21, 1950, in Monessen, Pennsylvania to John B. Persico and Helen Gush Persico. He attended St. Cajetan Elementary School. Deciding to become a priest, he entered St. Joseph Hall Minor Seminary in Greensburg, Pennsylvania, graduating in 1969.

Persico then attended St. Pius X Seminary in Erlanger, Kentucky. He continued his studies for the priesthood in 1973 at Saint Vincent Seminary in Latrobe, Pennsylvania, receiving a Master of Divinity degree in 1977.

=== Priesthood ===
Persico was ordained a priest by Bishop William G. Connare for the Diocese of Greensburg at Blessed Sacrament Cathedral in Greensburg on April 30, 1977. After his 1977 ordination, the diocese assigned Persico as parochial vicar of Immaculate Conception Parish in Irwin, Pennsylvania from 1977 to 1980.

In 1980, Persico entered the School of Canon Law at the Catholic University of America in Washington, D.C., where he received a Licentiate of Canon Law in 1982. On Persico's return to Greensburg in 1983, Connare appointed him as assistant chancellor of the diocese and chaplain to the Sisters of Mercy at Assumption Hall in Greensburg. Persico was named as chancellor of the diocese in 1989.

In 1998, Persico was appointed pastor of Saint James Parish in New Alexandria, Pennsylvania. He would remain at Saint James until being named bishop in 2012. He was also named as moderator of the curia and as the bishop's delegate for clergy sexual abuse. In 2005, Bishop Lawrence Brandt named Persico vicar general of the diocese. From 2006 to 2011, he served two terms as vice-president of the Pennsylvania Catholic Conference. The Vatican elevated Persico to the rank of prelate of honor in 2005.

=== Bishop of Erie ===
On July 31, 2012, Pope Benedict XVI appointed Persico as bishop of Erie. He was consecrated by Archbishop Charles J. Chaput on October 1, 2012 at St. Peter Cathedral in Erie.Persico was hospitalized in August 2024 for what was described as emergency intestinal surgery.

==== Response to sex abuse cases ====
In early 2016, a grand jury called by Pennsylvania Attorney General Josh Shapiro began investigating sexual abuse by Catholic clergy in six Pennsylvania dioceses, including the Diocese of Greensburg.

In 2017, Persico settled a lawsuit brought against the diocese by a former employee. The plaintiff had previously complained to the diocese about Reverend Daniel Kresinski, saying he repeatedly made unwanted sexual advances to her using obscene gestures. She said that the diocese refused to address complaints and forced her to resign in October 2013. Persico initially told the victim that "he did not want her to contact the press with her complaint and asked her to sign a nondisclosure agreement," which she initially refused.

In April 2018, the diocese published a list of 34 priests and 17 laypeople who had been "credibly accused" of sexually abusing children. By July 2018, the list had grown to include 64 names. The Pennsylvania grand jury report was published in August 2018. After its release, Persico said that it should have also included the names of accused laypeople who worked for the diocese. Regarding Persico's response to the investigation, Shapiro remarked,

"Bishop Persico’s response to this crisis gives me hope. He was the only (bishop) to testify to the grand jury. He wanted to do the right thing. He did."

Regarding the case of Reverend David Poulson, "Shapiro said the diocese knew since at least May 2010 of Poulson’s sexual predator tendencies – but did nothing to report him to authorities until September 2016, in response to a subpoena from the grand jury." Persico was installed as bishop of Erie in 2012. In response, Persico said that "Poulson's name was not raised" during this four year span. Jim VanSickle, one of Poulson's accusers, said in an interview:

“I do believe Bishop Trautman and Bishop Persico knew. Father Poulson came forward in 2010 and said he becomes aroused around adolescent boys and he had a problem.”

Regarding the case of Reverend Sredzinski, page 510 of the grand jury report reads:

"On April 12, 2002, a phone call was received by Father Lawrence Persico from a witness ("Witness #1"), the contents of which were provided to Statnick. Witness #1 claimed that Sredzinski abused a relative of hers in Brownsville, PA in 1985 and that Sredzinski should be looked into further. There was nothing otherwise noted in the file regarding this phone call, including whether there was any follow-up by the Diocese."

Page 509 of the grand jury report reads:

"According to notes in Sredzinski's Diocesan file, on April 9, 2007, the mother of a classmates of Victim #1 placed a telephone call to Persico and informed him that her son had told her that when he was in 7th or 8th grade, Sredzinski abused Victim #1. It was her understanding that Victim #1's parents tried to report the incident to Statnick when Victim #1 was in 7th or 8th grade, but that nothing was ever done about it. She also indicated that Sredzinski took Victim #1 and her son overnight to Seven Springs when they were young. Persico's response was that because Victim #1 was 28 years old at the time of the mother's call, Victim #1 needed to report any abuse by Sredzinski himself."

James Faluszczak claims that he attempted to report Reverend Daniel J. Martin for sexual abuse, first to Trautman and then to Persico. Faluszczak said that he spoke with Persico on several occasions from October 2013 to February 2016. He presented his own allegations of abuse by Martin along with allegations from other individuals. Faluszczak said of those conversations:

"He certainly treated me as if it was nothing. He didn't take it seriously. When I told him that Father Martin molested me 15 times, he couldn't even bring himself to say that he was sorry that that happened to me."

== See also ==
- Catholic Church hierarchy
- Catholic Church in the United States
- Historical list of the Catholic bishops of the United States
- List of Catholic bishops of the United States
- Lists of patriarchs, archbishops, and bishops

Catholic Church titles
Preceded by Donald Walter Trautman	Bishop of Erie; 2012–present	Incumbent
