= Joshua Maria Young =

American prelate

His Excellency, The Most Reverend Joshua Maria Young
- Bishop of Erie
- Church: Roman Catholic Church
- See: Diocese of Erie
- In office: April 23, 1854 – September 18, 1866
- Predecessor: Michael O'Connor
- Successor: Tobias Mullen

Orders
- Ordination: April 1, 1838 by John Baptist Purcell
- Consecration: April 23, 1854 by John Baptist Purcell

Personal details
- Born: October 29, 1808 Acton, Maine
- Died: September 18, 1866 (aged 57) Erie, Pennsylvania
- Education: Mount St. Mary's University

Joshua Maria Young (October 29, 1808 – September 18, 1866) was an American prelate of the Roman Catholic Church. He served as bishop of the Diocese of Erie in Pennsylvania from 1854 until his death in 1866.

== Biography ==
=== Early life ===
Joshua Young was born in Acton, Maine, to Jonathan and Mehetable (née Moody) Young. One of ten children, he had three brothers and six sisters. Raised as a Congregationalist, he belonged to a prominent New England family of Harvard graduates and Protestant ministers.

At age eight, Young was sent to live with his uncle in Saco, Maine, and later became a printer's apprentice for the Eastern Argus newspaper in Portland, Maine, in 1823. He worked as editor of The Maine Democrat for about a year after his apprenticeship.

After a co-worker lent him Catholic books, Young decided to convert to Catholicism and received a conditional baptism in October 1828. Following his conversion, he changed his name to Joshua Maria Young in honor of the Virgin Mary. In 1830, he went to study for the priesthood at Cincinnati, Ohio, where he hoped the climate would be more congenial with his health. Young briefly worked for the Catholic Telegraph.

=== Priesthood ===
After completing his theological studies at Mount St. Mary's College in Emmitsburg, Maryland, Young was ordained a priest by Bishop John Purcell on April 1, 1838. He then labored as a missionary in the Western United States before becoming pastor of St. Mary's Parish at Lancaster, Ohio. He also attended the First Plenary Council of Baltimore in 1852 as a theologian to Bishop Purcell.

=== Bishop of Erie ===
On July 29, 1853, Young was appointed the second bishop of the Diocese of Erie by Pope Pius IX. He received his episcopal consecration on April 23, 1854, from Bishop Purcell, with Bishops Martin Spalding and Louis Rappe serving as co-consecrators.

Young was an opponent of slavery during the American Civil War (1861–1865). Due to the 1859 discovery of oil in Titusville, Young was forced to erect numerous churches to accommodate the new Catholic settlers along Oil Creek and the Allegheny River. At the beginning of Young's tenure, the diocese contained 28 churches and 14 priests; by the time of his death, the number of churches and priests were both over 50. He established several Catholic schools and orphanages, and a hospital. He also introduced into the diocese the Sisters of St. Joseph from Buffalo, New York.

Joshua Young died suddenly at his residence in Erie on September 18, 1886, at age 57.

Catholic Church titles
Preceded by Michael O'Connor	Bishop of Erie; 1854–1866	Succeeded by Tobias Mullen
