= Donald Walter Trautman =

Catholic bishop (1936–2022)

His Excellency, The Most Reverend Donald Walter Trautman
- Bishop Emeritus of Erie
- Diocese: Erie
- Appointed: June 2, 1990
- Installed: July 16, 1990
- Term ended: July 31, 2012
- Predecessor: Michael Joseph Murphy
- Successor: Lawrence T. Persico
- Previous posts: Auxiliary Bishop of Buffalo (1985–1990); Titular Bishop of Sassura (1985–1990)

Orders
- Ordination: April 2, 1962 by Paulus Rusch
- Consecration: April 16, 1985 by Edward Dennis Head, Bernard Joseph McLaughlin, and Stanislaus Joseph Brzana

Personal details
- Born: June 24, 1936 Buffalo, New York
- Died: February 26, 2022 (aged 85)
- Denomination: Catholic
- Motto: Feed my sheep
- Coat of arms

Styles of Donald Walter Trautman
- Reference style: His Excellency; The Most Reverend
- Spoken style: Your Excellency
- Religious style: Bishop

Donald Walter Trautman (June 24, 1936 – February 26, 2022) was an American prelate of the Catholic Church who served as bishop of the Diocese of Erie in Western Pennsylvania from 1990 to 2011. He previously served as an auxiliary bishop of the Diocese of Buffalo in New York from 1985 to 1990.

== Biography ==
=== Early life ===
Donald Trautman was born in Buffalo, New York, and attended Niagara University in Lewiston, New York. He studied theology under Karl Rahner at the University of Innsbruck in Austria, where he obtained his Licentiate of Sacred Theology in 1962.

=== Priesthood ===
Trautman was ordained to the priesthood in Innsbruck on April 7, 1962, for the Diocese of Buffalo. On his return to New York, he was assigned as a parish administrator in Collins, New York, then associate pastor at a parish in Buffalo.

Trautman studied biblical language for one year at the Catholic University of America in Washington, D.C., continuing his post-graduate work in Rome at the Pontifical Biblical Institute, earning his Licentiate in Scripture in 1965. During his studies in Rome, Trautman served as a peritus, or theological expert, at the Second Vatican Council. In 1966, he earned his Doctor of Sacred Theology degree from the Pontifical University of St. Thomas Aquinas (Angelicum).

From 1966 to 1973, Trautman taught Scripture and theology at St. John Vianney Seminary in Buffalo, where he also served as dean of students. Trautman worked as a retreat master for religious communities, and vice-president and president of Buffalo's Pastoral Council. He was private secretary to Bishop Edward Head, and later named chancellor (1973) and vicar general (1974) of the diocese. He was raised to the rank of an Honorary Prelate of His Holiness in 1975.

=== Auxiliary Bishop of Buffalo ===
On February 27, 1985, Trautman was appointed auxiliary bishop of the Diocese of Buffalo and Titular Bishop of Sassura by Pope John Paul II. He received episcopal consecration on April 16, 1985, from Bishop Head, with bishops Bernard McLaughlin and Stanislaus Brzana serving as co-consecrators, at St. Joseph Cathedral in Buffalo. After a period of pastoral work, he became rector of Christ the King Seminary.

=== Bishop of Erie ===
Pope John Paul II appointed Trautman as bishop of the Diocese of Erie on June 2, 1990. As bishop, he improved the diocesan youth and vocational programs, renovated the interior of St. Peter Cathedral, and established a diocesan Deposit and Loan Fund and a retirement home for clergy dedicated in honor of his predecessor, Bishop Michael Murphy.

Trautman was a participant of the United States Conference of Catholic Bishops, having served as chairman of the committees on doctrine, USCCB financial audit, and liturgy. Trautman also served as the episcopal moderator of the Apostleship of the Sea and of the Diocesan Fiscal Management Conference. The edition of April 4, 2007, of L'Osservatore Romano accidentally announced Bishop Trautman had died when he was confused with former bishop Michael Murphy, who had died April 2. The mistake was also noted by a cartoon in The Tablet.

Trautman was critical of the motu proprio Summorum Pontificum and indicated that those priests who celebrate such a Mass would first need to show that they have the requisite knowledge of its rubrics and of Latin.

=== Retirement ===
In June 2011, Trautman turned 75, at which point canon law requests that a bishop tender his resignation to the Pope. Trautman's successor, Monsignor Lawrence T. Persico, was appointed on July 31, 2012, at which point the Pope accepted Trautman's resignation.

=== Handling of sex abuse cases ===
On August 14, 2018, Pennsylvania Attorney General Josh Shapiro published a grand jury report concerning sex abuse in six Pennsylvania dioceses, including Erie. In the report, Trautman was criticized alongside former Bishop Murphy for allowing "predator priest" Chester Gawronski to remain in the Diocese despite numerous allegations of sexual abuse. Trautman afterwards released a statement criticizing Shapiro's portrayal of him in the report and noted that he had established guidelines in 1993 concerning how to deal with sexual abuse and later established the Diocesan Office for the Protection of Children and Youth in 2003 to protect children from sex abuse. Nevertheless, it was acknowledged that both Murphy and Trautman reassigned Gawronski multiple times between 1987 and 2002 and that Trautman renewed Gawronski's five-year term as a chaplain in St Mary's Home in Erie in 2001.

Two secret memos which were published by Erie priest and future Bishop of Altoona-Johnstown Mark Bartchak in August 2005 also revealed that Bartchak had told Trautman he had become aware of more witnesses to past sex abuse cases while investigating a sex abuse case against former Erie priest William Presley and that Trautman afterwards ordered that "additional witnesses should not be contacted, especially given the fact that it is not likely that they will lead to information" about crimes against minors. A male accuser had previously disclosed his allegations of sexual abuse against Presley to the Erie Diocese in 1982, 1987, and 2002. Presley had also transferred to the Roman Catholic Diocese of Harrisburg in 1986.

In June 2019, James Bottlinger, who was suing the Diocese of Buffalo, accused Trautman of protecting his abuser, Rev. Michael Freeman, from potential prosecution when Trautman served as vicar general in the 1980s. Trautman denied seeing Bottlinger in Freeman's private quarters. Bottlinger, who claims that Freeman started abusing him in 1984 later stated that Trautman told him "You should have never put yourself in that position" when he met with Trautman to report the abuse. Two other men accused Freeman of molesting them when they were boys and complaints against Freeman surfaced as early as 1981. Freeman died in 2010.

=== Death ===
Trautman died on February 26, 2022, at the age of 85.

== See also ==
- Catholic Church hierarchy
- Catholic Church in the United States
- Historical list of the Catholic bishops of the United States
- List of Catholic bishops of the United States
- Lists of patriarchs, archbishops, and bishops

== Episcopal succession ==
Catholic Church titles
Preceded by Michael Joseph Murphy	Bishop of Erie; 1990–2012	Succeeded by Lawrence T. Persico
Preceded by –	Auxiliary Bishop of Buffalo; 1985–1990	Succeeded by –
Preceded by Vincent Ignatius Kennally	— TITULAR — Bishop of Sassura; 1985–1990	Succeeded by Juozas Tunaitis
