= Bruce Lewandowski =

American bishop

His Excellency, The Most Reverend Bruce Alan Lewandowski CSsR
- Bishop of Providence
- Church: Catholic Church
- Diocese: Providence
- Appointed: April 8, 2025
- Installed: May 20, 2025
- Predecessor: Richard Henning
- Previous post: Auxiliary Bishop of Baltimore and Titular Bishop of Croae (2020-2025)

Orders
- Ordination: May 7, 1994 by William George Curlin
- Consecration: August 18, 2020 by William E. Lori, Adam Parker, and John McIntyre

Personal details
- Born: June 8, 1967 (age 59) Toledo, Ohio
- Denomination: Roman Catholicism
- Education: St. Alphonsus College; Washington Theological Union
- Motto: Because by your holy cross

Styles of Bruce Lewandowski
- Reference style: His Excellency; The Most Reverend
- Spoken style: Your Excellency
- Religious style: Bishop

Ordination history of Bruce Lewandowski
History
Priestly ordination
- Date: May 7, 1994
- Place: Basilica of the National Shrine of the Immaculate Conception, Washington, D.C.
Episcopal consecration
- Principal consecrator: William E. Lori
- Co-consecrators: John J. McIntyre; Adam John Parker
- Date: August 18, 2020
- Place: Cathedral of Mary Our Queen, Baltimore

Bruce Alan Lewandowski, CSsR (born June 8, 1967) is an American Catholic prelate who has served as Bishop of Providence since 2025. He previously was an auxiliary bishop for the Archdiocese of Baltimore. He is a member of the Redemptorists.

== Early life ==
Bruce Lewandowski was born in Toledo, Ohio, on June 8, 1967, to Robert and Frances Lewandowski. He grew up on a family farm in Lima, Ohio, with his four siblings. Lewandowski attended St. Gerard Elementary School in Lima and the minor seminary at St. Mary’s College in Erie, Pennsylvania. He subsequently attended Saint Alphonsus College in Suffield, Connecticut, and Holy Redeemer College in Washington, D.C.

Starting in 1988, Lewandowski studied theology at Washington Theological Union in Washington. Lewandowski also learned Spanish in anticipation of being assigned to missions run by the Redemptorists in the Dominican Republic or Paraguay.

== Presbyteral ministry ==
On May 7, 1994, Lewandowski was ordained by Bishop William Curlin to the priesthood for the Redemptorist order at the Basilica of the National Shrine of the Immaculate Conception in Washington, D.C.

After his 1994 ordination, the Redemptorists assigned Lewandowski as parish vicar at St. Cecilia Parish in Manhattan. Two years later, they transferred him to Immaculate Conception Parish in the Bronx in New York City. He was subsequently assigned as a missionary to Vieux Fort, Saint Lucia in 1998, remaining there until 2000.

The Redemptorists brought Lewandowski back to the United States to become pastor at St. Boniface Parish in Philadelphia. He then served as pastor of the Church of the Visitation of the Blessed Virgin Mary Parish in Kensington, Pennsylvania from 2006 to 2011.

Lewandowski was appointed vicar for cultural ministries in Philadelphia in 2011, then in 2015 was as assigned as pastor of Sacred Heart of Jesus Parish in Baltimore. He also became a leader in Baltimoreans United in Leadership Development (BUILD), and collaborated with the group in October 2018 to create a parish identity card. This was especially beneficial for parishioners at Sacred Heart who were undocumented immigrants. Lewandowski described planned raids by the U.S. Immigration and Customs Enforcement in June 2019, which would target immigrant communities, as "an act of domestic terrorism". He became Archbishop William Lori's interim delegate for Hispanic ministry on August 22, 2019.

== Episcopal ministry ==
=== Auxiliary Bishop of Baltimore ===
Lewandowski was appointed auxiliary bishop of Baltimore and titular bishop of Croae on June 10, 2020 by Pope Francis. He was consecrated by Lori on August 18, 2020, at the Cathedral of Mary Our Queen in Baltimore. Lori named Lewandowski as urban vicar for the archdiocese in September 2021, succeeding Denis J. Madden. He remained pastor of Sacred Heart of Jesus Parish.

In May 2024, Lewandowski led a large public meeting at the Cathedral of Mary Our Queen that presented the archdiocese's plan to shrink the number of parishes in Baltimore from 61 to 26.

=== Bishop of Providence ===
On April 8, 2025, Pope Francis appointed Lewandowski as bishop of Providence. He was installed on May 20, 2025.

== See also ==
- Catholic Church hierarchy
- Catholic Church in the United States
- Historical list of the Catholic bishops of the United States
- List of Catholic bishops of the United States
- Lists of patriarchs, archbishops, and bishops

== Episcopal succession ==
Catholic Church titles
Preceded by Emilio Allué	— TITULAR — Bishop of Croae; 2020–2025	Succeeded by Andres Cantoria Ligot
Preceded by –	Auxiliary Bishop of Baltimore; 2020–2025	Succeeded by –
Preceded by Richard Henning	Bishop of Providence; 2025–present	Incumbent
