= Washington Theological Union =

Former Catholic university in Washington, DC

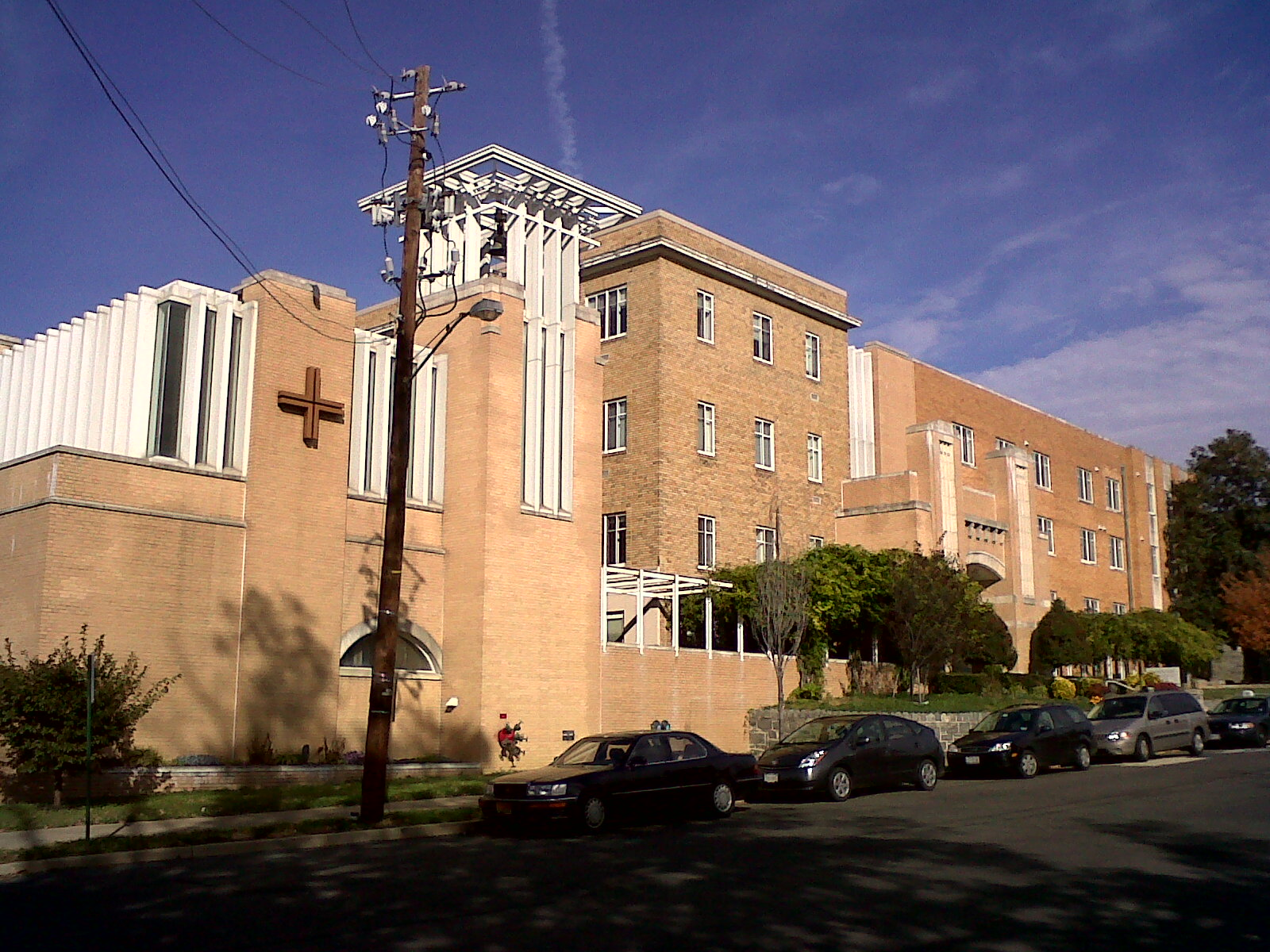
- Motto: freedom, faith, integrity
- Type: Private Roman Catholic seminary
- Active: 1968–2013
- Religious affiliation: Roman Catholic Church, Franciscan and Carmelite orders, among others
- Location: 6896 Laurel St., NW, Washington, D.C., U.S. 38.9746°N 77.0138°W
- Campus: Urban

Washington Theological Union (WTU) was a Catholic graduate school of theology and seminary in Washington, D.C, United States, founded in 1968. It stopped accepting students in 2011, and it ceased operations in 2015.

WTU was accredited by the Association of Theological Schools in the United States and Canada (ATS), the Middle States Commission on Higher Education and was a member of the Washington Theological Consortium.

== History ==
In the wake of the Second Vatican Council, religious orders and congregations of men found it helpful to train men studying for religious order priesthood together. Washington Theological Union was founded through a partnership of Franciscan Friars of the New York Holy Name Province, Conventual Franciscan Friars of the Midwest Province of Our Lady of Consolation, Augustinian Friars of the East Coast Province of St. Thomas of Villanova, and the Carmelite Friars the New York Province of St. Elias. The Master of Arts in Theology was first awarded to ten men from religious orders in 1972. The Master of Divinity was first awarded to four men in religious orders in 1975.

Eventually, the school expanded to include religious women and men, as well as lay students training for advanced ministerial degrees and programs. It attracted students not only from the United States but many foreign countries, as well.

In 1977, the first religious order woman received a Master of Arts degree in Theology and in 1980, the first laywoman received the Master of Divinity degree, followed in 1985 by the first layman to receive a Master of Arts in Theology degree. As a capstone, the Doctor of Ministry (D.Min.) degree in Christian Spirituality was given in 2011, followed by several other religious men and women, priests and laymen and women; the last being awarded in May 2015.

The school closed in 2015 because of financial difficulties, low enrollment, and declining vocations. Student records and archival history were transferred to Saint Bonaventure University in New York in 2015 after operations were wound down. Student records are administered by the Registrar's Office and other official historical information is administered by that university's Friedsam Library.

Over 4,500 students attended Washington Theological Union, with almost 500 of them completing a certificate during their sabbatical.

== Notable alumni ==
- Bruce Lewandowski, Auxiliary Bishop of Baltimore, Bishop of Providence
- Dennis G. Walsh, Bishop of Davenport
