= Adam Parker =

American Roman Catholic bishop (born 1972)

His Excellency, The Most Reverend Adam Parker
- Auxiliary Bishop of Baltimore; Titular Bishop of Tasaccora
- Archdiocese: Baltimore
- Appointed: December 5, 2016
- Installed: January 19, 2017
- Other posts: Titular Bishop of Tasaccora; Vicar general Moderator of the curia

Orders
- Ordination: May 27, 2000 by William Henry Keeler
- Consecration: January 19, 2017 by William E. Lori, Edwin Frederick O'Brien, and Donald Wuerl

Personal details
- Born: January 13, 1972 (age 54) Cleveland, Ohio, US
- Motto: Go make disciples

Styles of Adam John Parker
- Reference style: His Excellency; The Most Reverend
- Spoken style: Your Excellency
- Religious style: Bishop

Adam John Parker (born January 13, 1972) is an American Catholic prelate who has served as an auxiliary bishop for the Archdiocese of Baltimore since 2016. Parker has also served as vicar general and moderator of the curia.

== Biography ==
=== Early life and education ===
Adam Parker was born on January 13, 1972, in Cleveland, Ohio. He was the son of George and Maureen Parker. He grew up in Severna Park, Maryland, and was educated at Severna Park High School. Parker studied at Virginia Tech in Blacksburg, Virginia, and the University of Maryland, College Park in College Park, Maryland, graduating with a Bachelor of Arts degree in communications.

In 1994, having decided to enter the priesthood, Parker enrolled at St. Mary's Seminary and University in Baltimore, Maryland. In 1995, the Archdiocese of Baltimore sent Parker to reside at the Pontifical North American College in Rome while studying in the city. He received a Bachelor of Sacred Theology degree from the Pontifical Gregorian University in Rome in 1998.

=== Priesthood ===
On May 27, 2000, Parker was ordained to the priesthood for the Archdiocese of Baltimore by Cardinal William H. Keeler at the Cathedral of Mary Our Queen in Baltimore.

After his ordination, the archdiocese assigned Parker as associate pastor of St. Peter Parish in Westernport, Maryland. In 2001, he was transferred to St. Michael Parish in Frostburg, Maryland. After four years at St. Michael, the archdiocese appointed him first as administrator of Ascension Parish in Halethorpe, Maryland, then as its pastor. He served simultaneously as the associate director of the Permanent Diaconate Formation Team for the archdiocese from 2006 to 2007.

Keeler appointed Parker in 2007 to serve as priest secretary for the incoming archbishop, Edwin O'Brien. In September 2011, Parker was elevated to the rank of monsignor by Pope Benedict XVI. When the Vatican named O'Brien as grand master of the Order of the Holy Sepulchre and a cardinal in 2012, Parker relocated with him to Rome.

In 2013, Parker returned to Baltimore after Archbishop William E. Lori named him vice chancellor of the archdiocese. Lori in July 2014 appointed Parker as vicar general and moderator of the curia.

==== Auxiliary Bishop of Baltimore ====
On December 5, 2016, Pope Francis appointed Parker as an auxiliary bishop of Baltimore and titular bishop of Tasaccora. He was consecrated in the Cathedral of Mary Our Queen in Baltimore on January 19, 2017, by Lori, with Archbishop Edwin O'Brien and Bishop Donald Wuerl serving as co-consecrators.

== See also ==
- Catholic Church hierarchy
- Catholic Church in the United States
- Historical list of the Catholic bishops of the United States
- List of Catholic bishops of the United States
- Lists of patriarchs, archbishops, and bishops
