= Richard Henning =

American Catholic prelate (born 1964)

His Excellency, The Most Reverend Richard Henning
- Archbishop of Boston
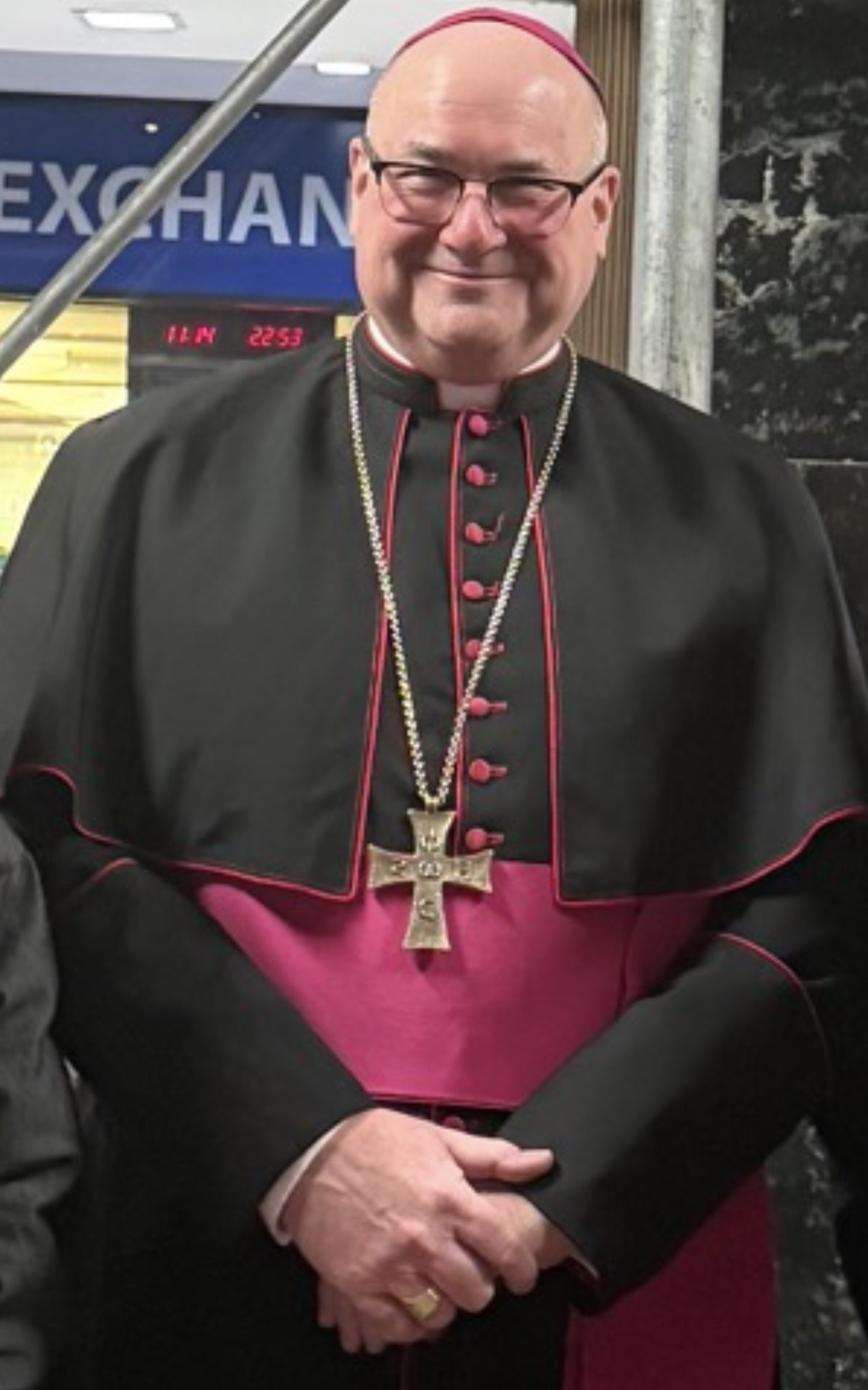
- Henning in 2025
- Archdiocese: Boston
- Appointed: August 5, 2024
- Installed: October 31, 2024
- Predecessor: Seán Patrick O'Malley
- Previous posts: Auxiliary Bishop of Rockville Centre and Titular Bishop of Tabla (2018–2022); Coadjutor Bishop of Providence (2022–2023); Bishop of Providence (2023–2024)

Orders
- Ordination: May 30, 1992 by John R. McGann
- Consecration: July 24, 2018 by John Barres, William Murphy, and Robert J. Brennan

Personal details
- Born: October 17, 1964 (age 62) Rockville Centre, New York, US
- Parents: Richard and Maureen Henning
- Education: Saint John's University (B.A. 1986; M.A. 1988); Seminary of the Immaculate Conception; The Catholic University of America (LTh, 2000); Pontifical University of Saint Thomas Aquinas (DTh, 2007)
- Motto: Put out into the deep
- Styles
- Reference style: His Excellency; The Most Reverend
- Spoken style: Your Excellency
- Religious style: Archbishop

Richard Garth Henning (born October 17, 1964) is an American Catholic prelate serving as archbishop of Boston in Massachusetts since 2024. He previously served as bishop of Providence in Rhode Island from 2023 to 2024 and as an auxiliary bishop of Rockville Centre in New York State from 2018 to 2022.

== Biography ==
=== Early life ===
Richard Garth Henning was born on October 17, 1964, in Rockville Centre, New York, growing up at Holy Name of Mary Parish and grade school. His father was a firefighter, and his mother was a nurse. Henning credits their examples of service with inspiring his own vocation. He graduated from Chaminade High School in Mineola, New York in 1982.

Henning was awarded a Bachelor of Arts degree in history in 1986 and a Master of Arts degree in history from St. John's University (New York City) in 1988. After graduation, he entered the Seminary of the Immaculate Conception in Lloyd Harbor, New York for priestly formation.

=== Priesthood ===
On May 30, 1992, Henning was ordained to the priesthood for the Diocese of Rockville Centre by Bishop John R. McGann at St. Agnes Cathedral. After his 1992 ordination, the diocese assigned Henning as an assistant pastor in a parish in Port Washington, New York.

In 1997, the diocese sent Henning to the Catholic University of America School of Theology in Washington, D.C., where he earned his Licentiate of Sacred Theology in biblical theology in 2000. He then spent the next two years in Rome working towards a Doctor of Theology degree in biblical theology at the Pontifical University of St. Thomas Aquinas, which he completed in 2007.

In 2002, Henning was appointed a professor of sacred scripture at the Seminary of the Immaculate Conception. Henning, in 2008 co-authored the book, Christ Our Hope: Benedict XVI’s Apostolic Journey to the United States and Visit to the United Nations.

In 2012, Henning was named rector of Immaculate Conception. He oversaw the transition of Immaculate Conception from a seminary to hosting retreats and a formation program for the laity. He also served as the inaugural director of the Sacred Heart Institute for the Ongoing Formation of Clergy, located in the Immaculate Conception facility.

Bishop John O. Barres appointed Henning as vicar for pastoral planning in 2018 and vicar for clergy in Rockville Centre in 2021.

=== Auxiliary bishop of Rockville Centre ===
Coat of arms as auxiliary bishop of Rockville Centre and as coadjutor bishop of Providence

Pope Francis appointed Henning as auxiliary bishop of Rockville Centre and titular bishop of Tabla on June 8, 2018. He was consecrated by Barres at St. Agnes Cathedral on July 24, 2018, with Bishops William Murphy and Robert J. Brennan serving as co-consecrators.

=== Coadjutor bishop and bishop of Providence ===
Coat of arms as bishop of Providence

On November 23, 2022, Francis appointed Henning as coadjutor bishop of Providence to assist Bishop Thomas J. Tobin. He was installed on January 26, 2023. Henning succeeded as bishop of Providence on May 1, 2023, when Tobin retired.

=== Archbishop of Boston ===
On August 5, 2024, Francis named Henning to succeed Seán Patrick O'Malley as archbishop of Boston. When asked in August 2024 about the sexual abuse scandal in the Catholic Church, Henning replied;

“If there are Catholics who are scandalized, I understand why they’re scandalized. It’s scandalous and certainly painful for me over the course of my life. But it has not made me lose my faith in God or my faith in the possibility of reconciliation and new life, even in the midst of what may feel devastating. So I would say to them that if I have failed you, if a leader in their Church has failed you, I’m so sorry, but God has not failed you."

Henning was installed as archbishop in Boston on October 31, 2024. He is fluent in Spanish and Italian and literate in French, Greek, and Hebrew.

In his first six months as archbishop, Henning said that he had "been on probably more than a dozen college campuses," and "there has been something remarkable happening among the college students" regarding their interest in Catholicism. He posited that Pope Leo XIV would be able to "receive what is happening among the youth and amplify it."

In 2025, Henning led a multi-day Eucharistic procession by boat, visiting several parish communities along the North Shore of Massachusetts Bay. Henning cited the difficulty in bringing the people of the diocese together and wanting to bring the eucharist to people as motivations for the procession. He suggested that Eucharistic devotion is one factor driving increased interest in Catholicism in the archdiocese among college students and young adults.

In June 2025, Henning received the pallium from Pope Leo XIV at a ceremony in Rome. Henning said he felt like a "deer in the headlights" as he approached Leo. He said the ceremony was a moment of being "taken possession of... by the life of the church," and that he would return to Boston with a "sense of renewal."

== Views ==
=== Abortion ===
Regarding abortion, Henning said he opposes it because all human life is sacred.

The question I always have to ask is, if the child in the womb is not human, then what is it?” There’s a truth here that needs space at the table, too, and for us, as Catholics, it’s really important that we keep standing up for that, and I will certainly do that.

In 2026, Henning, along with the other bishops in Massachusetts Edgar da Cunha, Robert J. McManus, and William D. Byrne, released a statement opposing the ultimately-successful legislative effort to remove limits to late-term abortion in Massachusetts. The statement said that the proposed legislation was "a radical measure which is gravely immoral," and quoted from the Gospel of Matthew, "'whatsoever you do to the least of these you do to me.'"

=== Catholic Church ===
Henning, in July 2025, stated that he thinks that the Catholic Church must emphasize Christ above all else. He has expressed that he feels the Holy Spirit urging that his ministry as a bishop be Christocentric. He contrasted this with the emphasis of the Church as a "bureaucratic" institution, which he saw as making the Church into "something of a political animal." Henning attended the 2024 Eucharistic Congress, which he lauded for having "the focus of every day [be] on the Lord himself."

Henning has called himself a "big fan of communion ecclesiology," describing the Catholic Church as

a communion, but a communion forged by the Lord, and it all circles around the Son who is Christ. When we deepen our relationship with Christ, we are more perfectly bound to one another.

=== Gun violence ===
In August 2025, Henning released a statement on the mass shooting at Annunciation Catholic School in Minneapolis, Minnesota, that killed two children and wound 17 other people.

I would like to express prayerful solidarity with the community of Annunciation Parish and school, Archbishop Hebda, and all the clergy, religious and faithful of the Archdiocese of St. Paul & Minneapolis as today they suffer the effects of cruel violence. We pray seeking healing for the wounded, strength for the bereaved, and peace for the students who died while gathered with their classmates in prayer.

=== Immigration ===
Henning expressed his approval of the statement of the US Conference of Catholic Bishops (USCCB) in November 2025 criticizing the policies of the Trump Administration on immigration and on the aggressive tactics being used by its agencies in enforcing these policies. Henning stated that Catholic teaching:

“...exhorts nations to recognize the fundamental dignity of all persons, including immigrants...We bishops advocate for a meaningful reform of our nation’s immigration laws and procedures. Human dignity and national security are not in conflict.

After the Trump Administration revoked Temporary Protected Status for Haitians and Syrians in the United States, Henning addressed them as "a vital part of our Archdiocese" and called on the U.S. Congress to "act swiftly to protect these families and provide them with a secure and humane path forward."

=== LGBTQ ===
In April 2023, Henning stated that same sex marriage "doesn't work in Catholic theology." However, he added that,

That doesn’t mean that the church hates people who have same-sex attraction. That doesn’t mean that they’re somehow evil or anything like that, right? All of us are sinners, in fact, in need of grace. I certainly am.

During a 2024 news conference in Providence after his appointment as archbishop of Boston, Henning stated that his views on same-sex marriage aligned completely with those expressed by Pope Francis.

== Personal life ==
Henning has a fondness for praying by the ocean, jokingly calling the sea coast his "happy place." He has said praying by the sea has been important in his life.

== See also ==
- Catholic Church hierarchy
- Catholic Church in the United States
- Historical list of the Catholic bishops of the United States
- List of Catholic bishops of the United States
- Lists of patriarchs, archbishops, and bishops

Catholic Church titles
Preceded by -	Auxiliary Bishop of Rockville Centre; 2018-2022	Succeeded by -
Preceded by -	Coadjutor Bishop of Providence; 2022-2023	Succeeded by -
Preceded by Thomas Joseph Tobin	Bishop of Providence; 2023-2024	Succeeded by Bruce Lewandowski
Preceded by Seán Patrick O'Malley	Archbishop of Boston; 2024-present	Succeeded by Incumbent
