= Gordon Dunlap Bennett =

Jamaican Catholic bishop

His Excellency, The Most Reverend Gordon Dunlap Bennett SJ
- Bishop Emeritus of Mandeville
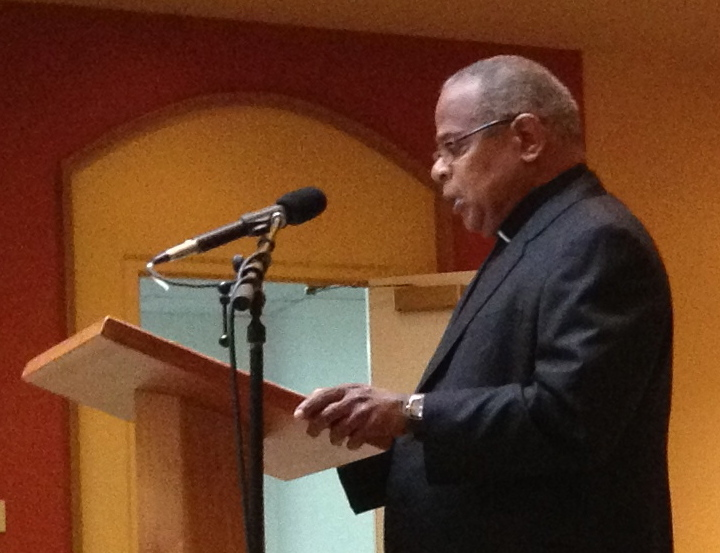
- Bennett speaking at St. Ignatius College Preparatory in San Francisco
- Diocese: Mandeville
- Appointed: July 6, 2004
- Installed: September 24, 2004
- Term ended: August 8, 2006
- Predecessor: Paul Michael Boyle
- Successor: Neil Edward Tiedemann
- Previous post: Auxiliary Bishop of Baltimore

Orders
- Ordination: June 14, 1975 by Timothy Manning
- Consecration: March 3, 1998 by William H. Keeler, Carlos Arthur Sevilla, and George V. Murry

Personal details
- Born: October 21, 1946 (age 79) Denver, Colorado
- Motto: Grace Upon Grace

Styles of Gordon Dunlap Bennett
- Reference style: His Excellency; The Most Reverend
- Spoken style: Your Excellency
- Religious style: Bishop

Gordon Dunlap Bennett, S.J. (born October 21, 1946) is an American Catholic retired prelate who served as Bishop of Mandeville in Jamaica from 2004 to 2006. He was banned from active ministry in two dioceses of the Baltimore Province following an allegation of adult sexual harassment. Bennett is also a former Auxiliary Bishop of Baltimore and a member of the Jesuits.

== Early life ==
Bennett was born on October 21, 1946, in Denver. He first attended Loyola Grammar School in Denver. After his family moved to Los Angeles in 1955, Bennett went to Holy Spirit Elementary School and then St. Thomas the Apostle Elementary School. In 1964, Bennett graduated from Loyola High School in Los Angeles as the class valedictorian.

Later in 1964, Bennett entered the Society of Jesus at Santa Barbara, California. On September 8, 1966 he pronounced his first vows as a Jesuit.

In 1966, Bennett enrolled at Loyola Marymount University, but transferred in 1968 to Gonzaga University. He graduated from Gonzaga with a Bachelor of Arts in Philosophy. Bennett then returned to Los Angeles to teach at Loyola High School. In 1975, he graduated with a Master of Divinity from the Jesuit School of Theology in Berkeley, California.

On June 14, 1975, Bennett was ordained to the priesthood at Blessed Sacrament Catholic Church in Hollywood, California. His first assignment after ordination was as Assistant Principal for Campus Ministry at St. Ignatius College Preparatory in San Francisco, serving there until 1979.

In 1979, Bennett received his Masters in Education in Secondary School Administration at Loyola Marymount University. In 1980, he received a Professional Diploma in Administration from Fordham University. In 1980, Bennett became principal of Loyola High School, serving in that role until 1988. On February 2, 1983, Bennett pronounced his final vows as a Jesuit.

In 1989, Bennett became the Rector and Master of Novices at the Jesuit Novitiate in both Santa Barbara and Culver City, California. In 1996, he was named President of Loyola High School.

== Episcopacy ==
In 1998, Pope John Paul II appointed Titular Bishop of Nesqually and Auxiliary Bishop of Baltimore. He was ordained Bishop at the Cathedral of Mary Our Queen in Baltimore on March 3, 1998

On July 6, 2004, John Paul II appointed Bennett as Bishop of Madeville, Jamaica. He assumed his duties as bishop of Mandeville, Jamaica, on September 24, 2004.

=== Resignation ===
In May 2006, a young adult in Jamaica, who knew Bennett from Baltimore, complained to then-Archbishop of Baltimore William Keeler that Bennett had sexually harassed them. Keeler reported the allegations to the apostolic nunciature in Washington DC. On August 8, 2006, citing health reasons, Bennett resigned as Bishop of Mandeville.

=== Later life ===
After leaving Jamaica in 2006, Bennett moved to Los Angeles, working for several months organizing retreats and formation cessions for the Archdiocese of Los Angeles. He was then appointed the Peter Faber, S.J. Fellow in Pastoral Theology and Ignatian Spirituality at Loyola Marymount University.

In 2009, the Vatican cleared Bennett of the sexual harassment allegations from 2006. However, the Vatican limited him to a narrowed range of episcopal duties, all under supervision.

In March 2019, Archbishop William Lori of Baltimore forbade Bennett from exercising ministry in the Archdiocese of Baltimore due to the 2006 allegation of sexual harassment, which a stricter investigation on their part deemed credible. On March 12, 2019, The New York Times reported that a statement from the Society of Jesus said Bennett had stopped working in ministry in August 2018 and was undergoing treatment for cancer.

== See also ==
- Catholic Church hierarchy
- Catholic Church in the United States
- Historical list of the Catholic bishops of the United States
- List of Catholic bishops of the United States
- Lists of patriarchs, archbishops, and bishops

== Episcopal succession ==
Catholic Church titles
Preceded by Paul Michael Boyle	Bishop of Mandeville; 2004-2006	Succeeded by Neil Edward Tiedemann
Preceded by -	Auxiliary Bishop of Baltimore; 1998-2004	Succeeded by -
