= Connerton =

Connerton may refer to:

- Connerton, Florida, a census-designated place
- Connerton, Pennsylvania, an unincorporated community
- a historical name for a manor in what is now Gwithian, England
