= Denis J. Madden =

American prelate of the Catholic Church (born 1940)

His Excellency, The Most Reverend Denis James Madden
- Auxiliary Bishop Emeritus of Baltimore; Titular Bishop of Baia
- Archdiocese: Baltimore
- Appointed: May 10, 2005
- Installed: August 24, 2005
- Retired: December 5, 2016
- Other post: Titular Bishop of Baia

Orders
- Ordination: April 1, 1967
- Consecration: August 24, 2005 by William Henry Keeler, William Francis Malooly, and Mitchell Thomas Rozanski

Personal details
- Born: Denis James Madden; March 8, 1940 (age 86) Carbondale, Pennsylvania
- Motto: In all things may God be glorified

Styles of Denis James Madden
- Reference style: His Excellency; The Most Reverend
- Spoken style: Your Excellency
- Religious style: Bishop

Denis James Madden (born March 8, 1940) is an American Catholic prelate who served as an auxiliary bishop of the Archdiocese of Baltimore from 2005 to 2015.

== Biography ==
=== Early life ===
Denis Madden was born on March 8, 1940, to William and Anna (née Burnakis) Madden in Carbondale, Pennsylvania; his father was of Irish descent and his mother of Lithuanian descent, He later entered the Order of St. Benedict, and received his undergraduate degree at St. Benedict's College in Atchison, Kansas.

=== Ordination and ministry ===
Madden was ordained to the priesthood for the Order of St. Benedict by Bishop Lawrence Casey on April 1, 1967. Madden attended Columbia University in New York City, where he obtained a master's degree in psychology. He then went to the University of Notre Dame in Notre Dame, Indiana, earning a PhD in clinical psychology

In 1973, Madden assumed a post in the psychology department at the University of Maryland in Baltimore, concurrently working as a marriage and family counselor for Associated Catholic Charities. He taught as a professor at the University of Maryland School of Medicine, and provided counseling to the clergy and religious of the archdiocese as well. In 1976. Madden was allowed to leave the Benedictine Order and become incardinated with the Archdiocese of Baltimore.

After co-founding the humanitarian organization Accord Foundation, Madden served as director of the Pontifical Mission for Palestine office in Jerusalem from 1994 to 1996, He was then appointed associate secretary general of the Catholic Near East Welfare Association (CNEWA). While at CNEWA, Madden was part of the long delayed 1992 restoration of the dome and the rotunda inside the Church of the Holy Sepulchre in Jerusalem

=== Auxiliary Bishop of Baltimore ===
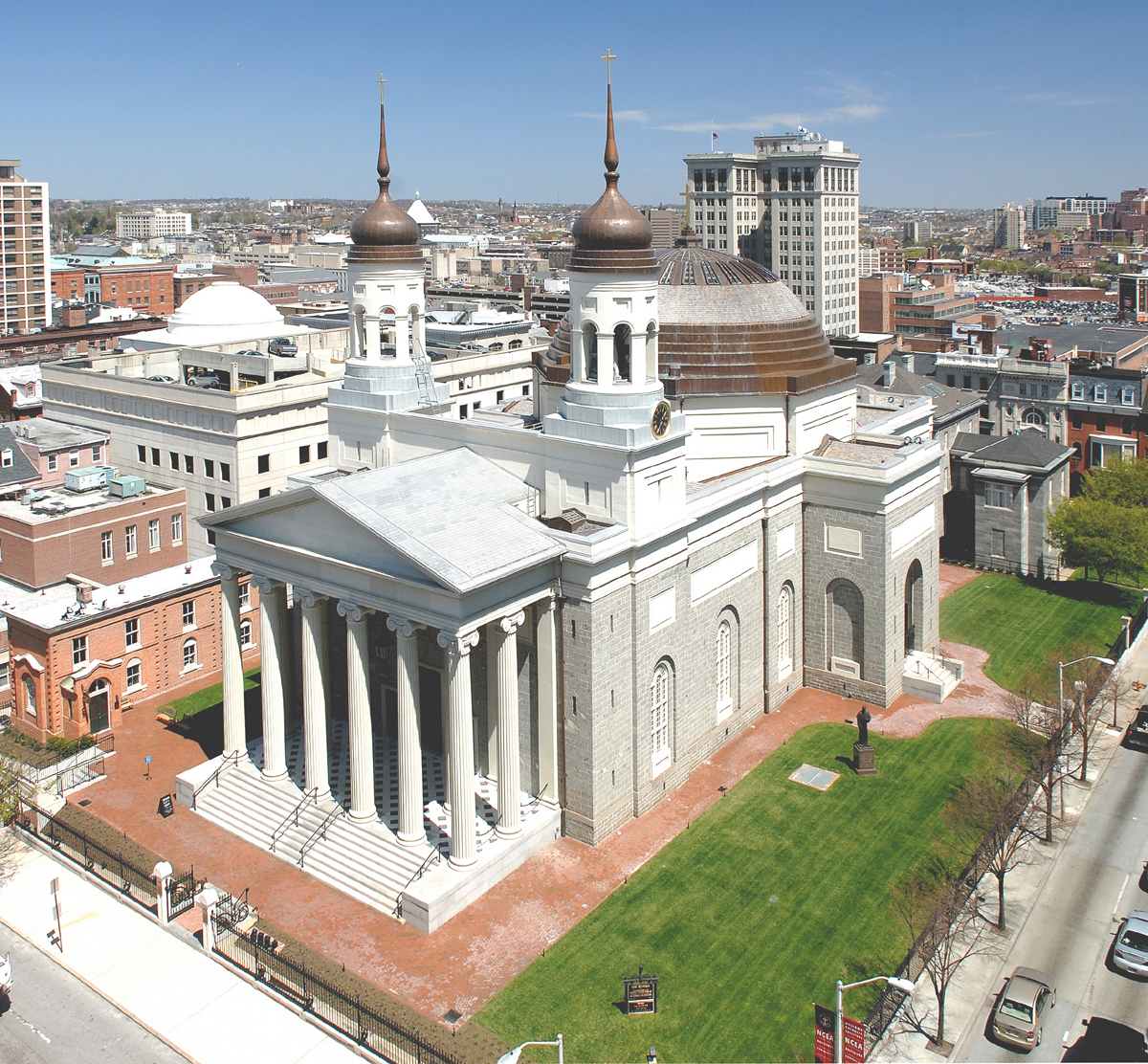
Basilica of the National Shrine of the Assumption of the Virgin Mary, Baltimore, Maryland (2007)

On May 10, 2005, Madden was appointed auxiliary bishop of the Archdiocese of Baltimore and titular bishop of Baia by Pope Benedict XVI. He was the new pope's first episcopal appointment in the United States. Madden was consecrated on August 24, 2005, by Cardinal William Keeler, with Bishops William Malooly and Mitchell T. Rozanski serving as co-consecrators.Madden chose as his episcopal motto, In All Things May God Be Glorified, a phrase taken from The Rule of St. Benedict. Madden was also given the additional role of urban vicar for the fifty parishes in Baltimore.

Madden served as the Neumann vicar, responsible for parishes in the City of Baltimore, Baltimore County and Harford County. He also served as interim rector of the Basilica of the National Shrine of the Assumption of the Blessed Virgin Mary in Baltimore. Madden is a licensed clinical psychologist in both Maryland and Washington, D.C.

=== Retirement ===
On March 8, 2015, Madden reached age 75 and was required by canon law to submit a letter of resignation to Pope Francis. The pope accepted his retirement on December 5, 2016. Though Madden was officially retired, Archbishop William Lori asked him to continue as vicar general and urban vicar. In September 2021, the archdiocese announced that Madden was retiring as urban vicar.

== See also ==
- Catholic Church hierarchy
- Catholic Church in the United States
- Historical list of the Catholic bishops of the United States
- List of Catholic bishops of the United States
- Lists of patriarchs, archbishops, and bishops

Catholic Church titles
Preceded by –	Auxiliary Bishop of Baltimore; 2005–2016	Succeeded by –
