= Joseph Thomas Daley =

American Catholic bishop (1915–1983)

His Excellency, The Most Reverend Joseph Thomas Daley
- Bishop of Harrisburg
- See: Diocese of Harrisburg
- In office: 1971-1983
- Predecessor: George L. Leech
- Successor: William Henry Keeler

Orders
- Ordination: June 7, 1941 by Dennis Joseph Dougherty
- Consecration: January 7, 1964 by John Krol

Personal details
- Born: December 21, 1915 Connerton, Schuylkill County, Pennsylvania, US
- Died: September 2, 1983 (aged 67) Harrisburg, Pennsylvania, US
- Denomination: Roman Catholic
- Education: St. Charles Borromeo Seminary

Joseph Thomas Daley (December 21, 1915 – September 2, 1983) was an American prelate of the Roman Catholic Church. He served as bishop of the Diocese of Harrisburg in Pennsylvania from 1971 until his death in 1983.

== Biography ==
=== Early life ===
Joseph Daley was born on December 21, 1915, in Connerton, Schuylkill County, Pennsylvania. He studied at St. Charles Borromeo Seminary in Philadelphia. Daley was ordained to the priesthood by Cardinal Dennis Dougherty on June 7, 1941.

=== Auxiliary Bishop, Coadjutor Bishop and Bishop of Harrisburg ===
On November 25, 1963, Daley was appointed as an auxiliary bishop of Harrisburg and titular bishop of Barca by Pope Paul VI. He received his episcopal consecration at the Cathedral of Saints Peter and Paul in Philadelphia on January 7, 1964, from Archbishop John Krol, with Bishops George L. Leech and Gerald McDevitt serving as co-consecrators.

Daley was named coadjutor bishop of Harrisburg on July 31, 1967, by Paul VI. Daley automatically succeeded Leech as the sixth bishop of Harrisburg on October 19, 1971.

During his 12-year-long tenure, Daley established the diocesan Office of Planning, the diocesan Development Office, and the Emmaus Program for priests. He called for a temporary moratorium on building nuclear power plants after the accident at the Three Mile Island Nuclear Generating Station near Harrisburg in 1979.

=== Death and legacy ===
Joseph Dale died in Harrisburg from cancer on September 2, 1983, at age 67. On August 1, 2018, Bishop Ronald Gainer, Daley's successor as bishop of Harrisburg, announced that the diocese was removing the names of every bishop of Harrisburg from 1947 onward – including Daley's – from any building or room in the diocese named in their honor, due to their failure to protect victims of sexual abuse.

Catholic Church titles
Preceded by George L. Leech	Bishop of Harrisburg; 1971–1983	Succeeded by William Henry Keeler
