= George L. Leech =

American prelate

His Excellency, The Most Reverend George Leech
- Bishop of Harrisburg; Titular Bishop of Mela; Titular Bishop of Allegheny
- Church: Roman Catholic Church
- See: Diocese of Harrisburg
- Predecessor: Philip R. McDevitt
- Successor: Joseph Thomas Daley
- Other post: Titular Bishop of Mela
- Previous posts: Auxiliary Bishop of Harrisburg; July to December 1935

Orders
- Ordination: May 29, 1920 by Denis Dougherty
- Consecration: October 17, 1935 by Denis Dougherty

Personal details
- Born: May 21, 1890 Ashley, Pennsylvania, US
- Died: March 12, 1985 (aged 94) Harrisburg, Pennsylvania, US
- Education: St. Charles Borromeo Seminary; Catholic University of America

Styles of George Leech
- Reference style: The Right Reverend
- Spoken style: Your Excellency
- Religious style: Bishop
- Posthumous style: none

George Leo Leech (May 21, 1890 – March 12, 1985) was an American prelate of the Roman Catholic Church. He served as bishop of Harrisburg in Pennsylvania from 1935 to 1971.

== Biography ==
=== Early life ===
George Leech was born on May 21, 1890, in Ashley, Pennsylvania, to William Dillon and Helen Mary (née Fitzimons) Leech. He attended Hanover Township High School in Hanover, Pennsylvania, and St. Charles Borromeo Seminary in Philadelphia.

=== Priesthood ===
Leech was ordained to the priesthood by Archbishop Denis Dougherty on May 29, 1920. He then furthered his studies at the Catholic University of America in Washington, D.C., where he obtained his doctorate in canon law.

Leech served as secretary of the Apostolic Delegation to the United States, and then as pastor of St. Patrick's Parish in Pottsville, Pennsylvania. The Vatican raised Leech to the rank of a privy chamberlain in 1925, and a domestic prelate in 1934. He also served as spiritual director of the Regional Holy Name Union and moderator of ecclesiastical conferences.

=== Auxiliary Bishop and Bishop of Harrisburg ===
On July 6, 1935, Leech was appointed as an auxiliary bishop of Harrisburg and titular bishop of Mela by Pope Pius XI. He received his episcopal consecration on October 17, 1935, from Cardinal Dougherty, with Bishops Thomas O’Reilly and James Ryan serving as co-consecrators.

Pius XI named Leech as the fifth bishop of Harrisburg on December 19, 1935. After a month as bishop, he had memorized the forenames of all the clergy of his diocese. In 1946, Leech described Howard Hughes' 1943 film The Outlaw as "a destructive and corrupting picture which glamorizes crime and immorality".

Leech attended the Second Vatican Council from 1962 to 1965; Reverend William Keeler served as his peritus, or expert, at the council.

=== Retirement and legacy ===
On October 19, 1971, Pope Paul VI accepted Leech's resignation as bishop of Harrisburg and appointed him as titular bishop of Allegheny. Leech continued to reside at the episcopal residence. George Leech died on March 12, 1985, at Holy Spirit Hospital in Harrisburg at age 94. He is buried at Holy Cross Cemetery in Harrisburg.

On August 1, 2018, Bishop Ronald Gainer, Leech's successor as bishop of Harrisburg, announced that the diocese was removing the names of every bishop of Harrisburg from 1947 onward – including Leech's – from any building or room in the diocese named in their honor, due to their failure to protect victims of sexual abuse.

Catholic Church titles
Preceded by Philip R. McDevitt	Bishop of Harrisburg; 1935–1971	Succeeded by Joseph Thomas Daley
Preceded by -	Titular Bishop of Allegheny; 1971–1985	Succeeded by Edward Egan
