= Tablensis =

Tabla
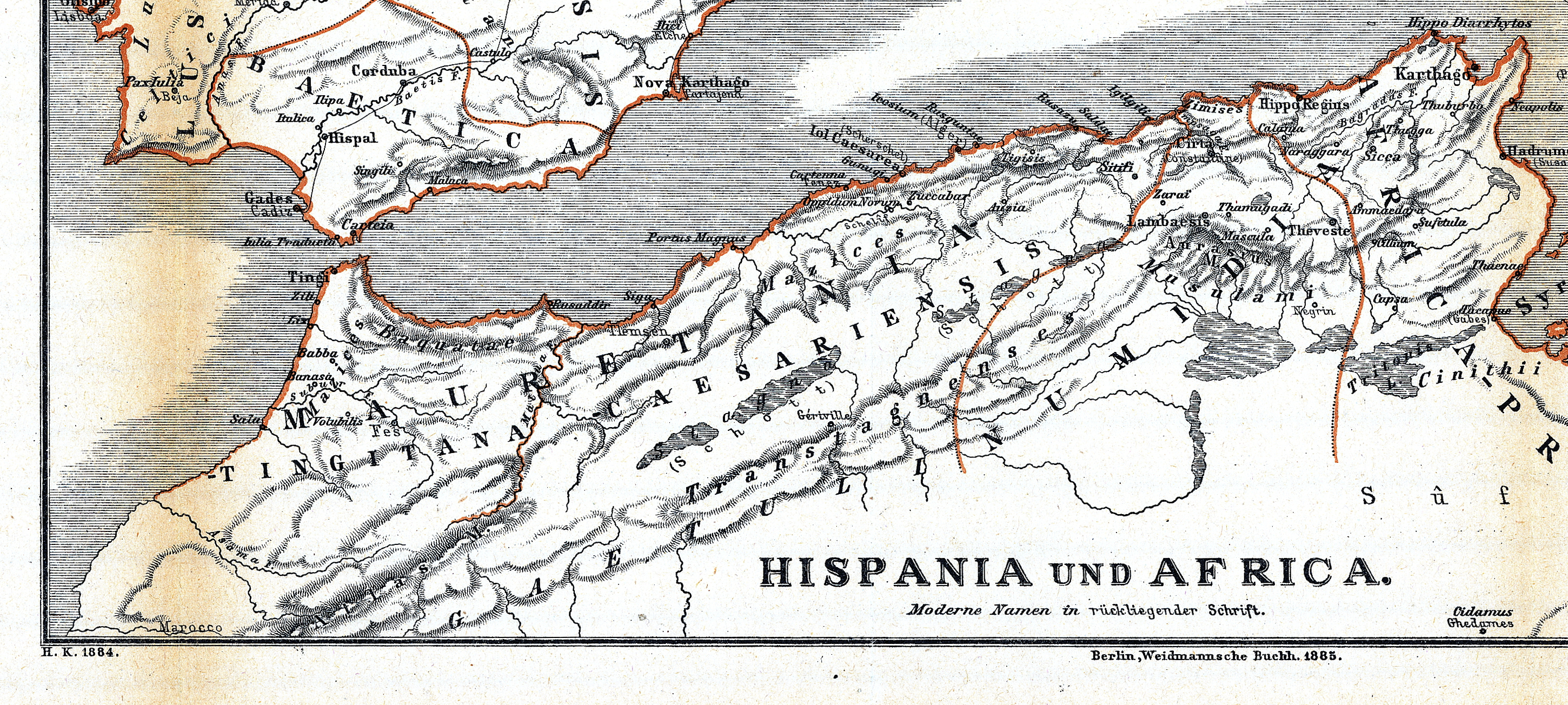
- Map of Roman North Africa.

- Location within Algeria
- 36.412°N 3.690556°E
- Location: Algeria

Tabala or Tablensis was an ancient city in the Roman-Berber province of Mauretania Caesariensis in modern Algeria. It was a Latin Catholic diocese.

== History ==
Tabla was founded during the Roman Empire and lasted until the coming of Islam in the early 7th century.

Known as Tablensis, the settlement was founded as a fort on the limes. McCarthy calls it "Tablat, the ... capital of a military march, under the Romans in the fifth century, near the Isseur, on the road to Auzia (Aumale) to Icosium (Algiers)." The name Tablatensis derives from the Latin word for barracks or Roman garrison. This may indicate a connection to its location on the Limes road.

From 429 to 533 the town was in Vandal dominion, and in 533 was taken by the Byzantine Empire. In 647 the settlement fell to the invading Umayyad Caliphate armies. A town named "Tablata" in Spain was founded by the Saracens, during the conquest of Spain in 711 which may suggest that men of Tabla or Tablata were part of this army.

== Location ==
Tabla has been tentatively identified with Tablat or Tablast in today's Algeria. According to Berber tradition Tablat is a locality of the Southeast of Blida.

Today the site of the town is a grass-covered hillside strewn with dressed stones indicating the presence of the former settlement. The site remains unexcavated.

== Bishopric ==
Tabala was also the seat of a Roman and Vandal era bishopric. The only known bishops of this diocese are Quodvultdeus (Catholic bishop, fl. 484), A catholic bishop who took part in the Council of Carthage (484) held by the Vandal king Huneric, after which Quodvultdeus was sent to exile. And Urbanus a Donatist bishop (fl. 440) summoned to Carthage for not adhereing to the Catholic religion.

In 1933 the diocese was reestablished in name and Tabla survives today as titular bishop. Until his death in March 2018, the bishop was Lino Bortolo Belotti. On July 24, 2018, Richard Garth Henning became its titular bishop. Currently its bishop is Juan Esposito-Garcia, who was consecrated on February 21, 2023, having been appointed by Pope Francis.
