= William H. Keeler =

American Catholic cardinal (1931–2017)

His Eminence William H. Keeler
- Cardinal, Archbishop of Baltimore
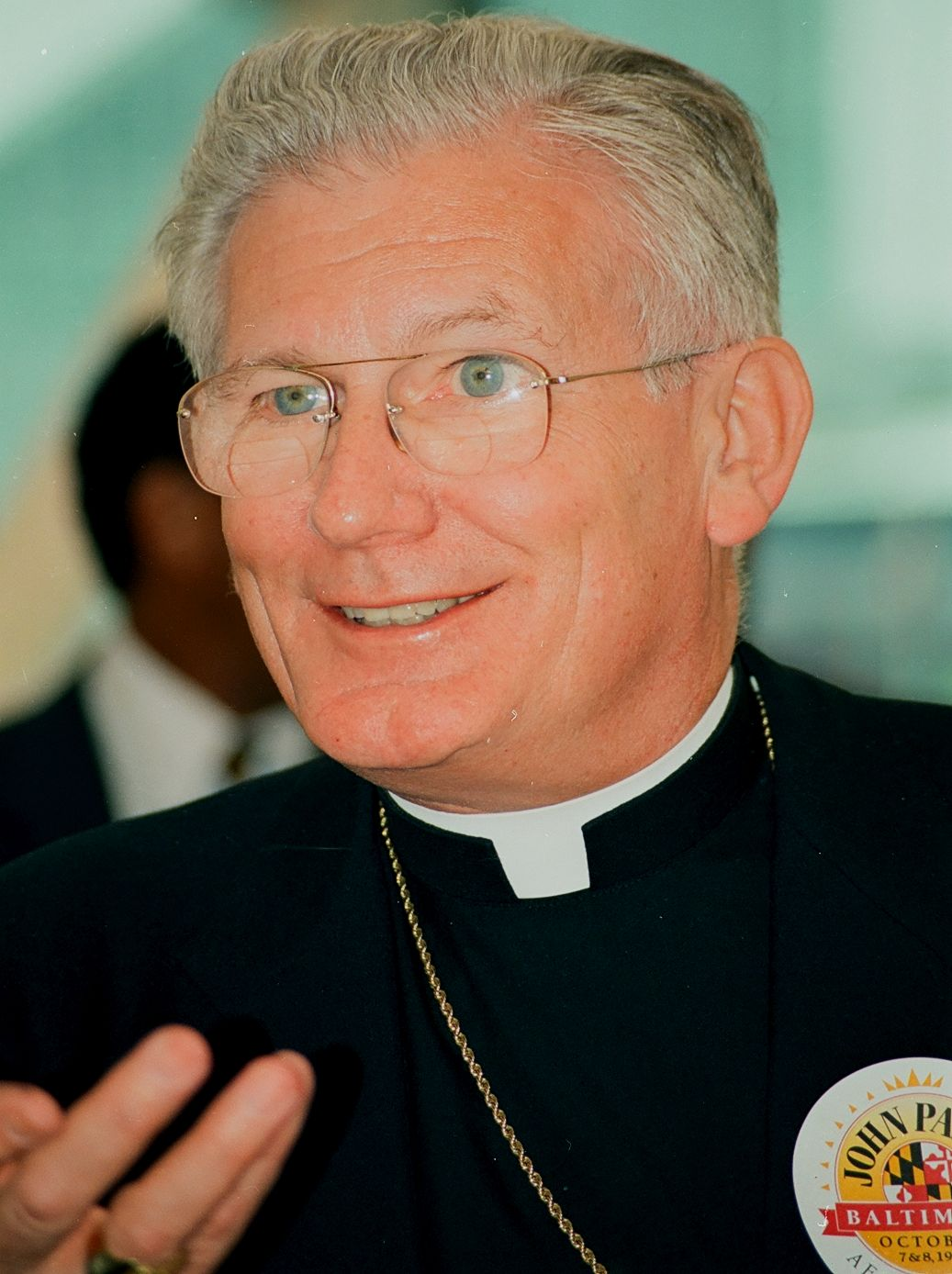
- Cardinal Keeler in 1996
- Archdiocese: Baltimore
- Appointed: April 11, 1989
- Installed: May 23, 1989
- Term ended: July 12, 2007
- Predecessor: William Donald Borders
- Successor: Edwin Frederick O'Brien
- Other post: Cardinal-Priest of Santa Maria degli Angeli
- Previous post: Bishop of Harrisburg (1984–1989) Auxiliary Bishop of Harrisburg (1979–1984)

Orders
- Ordination: July 17, 1955 by Luigi Traglia
- Consecration: September 21, 1979 by Joseph Thomas Daley
- Created cardinal: November 26, 1994 by John Paul II
- Rank: Cardinal-Priest

Personal details
- Born: March 4, 1931 San Antonio, Texas, US
- Died: March 23, 2017 (aged 86) Catonsville, Maryland, US
- Education: St. Charles Borromeo Seminary (BA); Pontifical Gregorian University (STL, JCD)
- Motto: Opus fac evangelistae (Do the work of an evangelist)

Styles of William Henry Keeler
- Reference style: His Eminence
- Spoken style: Your Eminence
- Religious style: Cardinal
- Informal style: Cardinal
- See: Baltimore (emeritus)

Ordination history of William H. Keeler
History
Episcopal consecration
- Consecrated by: Joseph Thomas Daley
- Date: September 21, 1979
Episcopal succession
Bishops consecrated by William H. Keeler as principal consecrator
- Gordon Bennett: March 3, 1998
- William Francis Malooly: March 1, 2001
- Mitchell T. Rozanski: August 21, 2004
- Michael Joseph Bransfield: February 22, 2005
- Denis J. Madden: August 24, 2005

William Henry Keeler (March 4, 1931 – March 23, 2017) was an American cardinal of the Catholic Church. He served as archbishop of Baltimore in Maryland, from 1989 to 2007 and was elevated to the College of Cardinals in 1994. He previously served as auxiliary bishop and bishop of the Diocese of Harrisburg in Pennsylvania. Keeler was president of the United States Conference of Catholic Bishops from 1992 to 1995.

As archbishop of Baltimore, Keeler was known for his swift action against priests who had been accused of inappropriate conduct. Keeler also led a restoration of the Basilica of the National Shrine of the Assumption of the Blessed Virgin Mary, one of two cathedrals in the archdiocese and the oldest in the United States, which was completely repaired and restored to near its original appearance by 2006. Keeler was also recognized for forming strong relationships with people from other religious groups, particularly those of the Jewish and Protestant faiths.

Keeler was also noted for his response to the sexual abuse crisis in the Catholic Church, choosing to publish the names of 57 priests who had been "credibly accused of child abuse" in 2002. However, the Diocese of Harrisburg in 2018 removed Keeler's name from its facilities due to his failure to protect victims of sexual abuse. Keeler was instrumental in getting a sexual abuse case against Father Joseph Maskell dropped in 1993, absolutely failing to protect future victims, and dismissing former victims Jane Doe and Jane Roe as unreliable witnesses against him.

== Biography ==
=== Early life ===
William Keeler was born on March 4, 1931, in San Antonio, Texas, to Thomas Love and Margaret (née Conway) Keeler. One of five children, Lawrence Keeler was of mixed Irish, Alsatian, and Scottish ancestry. Margaret Keeler, the daughter of an Illinois farmer, was a schoolteacher. Thomas Love was a steel-casting salesman.

Shortly after Keeler's birth, the family moved to Lebanon, Pennsylvania. Keeler attended the St. Mary School and Lebanon Catholic High School. He joined the Boy Scouts of America and achieved the rank of Eagle Scout.

Deciding to become a priest, Keeler entered St. Charles Borromeo Seminary in Wynnewood, Pennsylvania, receiving a Bachelor of Arts in 1952. The Diocese of Harrisburg then sent him to study at the Pontifical Gregorian University in Rome.

=== Priesthood ===
While he was in Rome, Keeler was ordained to the priesthood for the Diocese of Harrisburg on July 17, 1955, by Archbishop Luigi Traglia. Keeler received a Licentiate of Sacred Theology (1956) and a Doctor of Canon Law (1961) from the Gregorian. After returning to Harrisburg in 1961, the diocese assigned him to pastoral and curial work.

With the start of the first session of the Second Vatican Council in 1962, Keeler served as peritus (expert) and secretary to Bishop George L. Leech in Rome. Keeler attended all four sessions of the council, from 1962 to 1965. Keeler worked for the Council Digest, a communications service used to bring news of the Council sessions to American Catholics.

=== Auxiliary Bishop and Bishop of Harrisburg ===
On July 24, 1979, Pope John Paul II appointed Keeler as auxiliary bishop of Harrisburg and titular bishop of Ulcinium. He received his episcopal consecration on September 21, 1979, at the Cathedral of Saint Patrick in Harrisburg, Pennsylvania, from Bishop Joseph Thomas Daley, with Bishops Francis Gossman and Martin Lohmuller serving as co-consecrators. Keeler took as his episcopal motto: Opus Fac Evangelistae ("Do the Work of an Evangelist").

John Paul II appointed Keeler as the seventh bishop of Harrisburg on November 10, 1983, succeeding Daley. Keeler was installed on January 4, 1984, in the Cathedral of St. Patrick. As bishop of Harrisburg, Keeler served on committees for interreligious dialogue and helped expand diocesan youth ministry.

As bishop, Keeler made the fostering of ministry to Hispanic Catholics a top priority. In 1979, he purchased a vacant church in York, Pennsylvania, to erect the first Spanish-language parish in the diocese. He frequently attended services and celebrations being held by the Hispanic community.

=== 1989 to 2000 ===
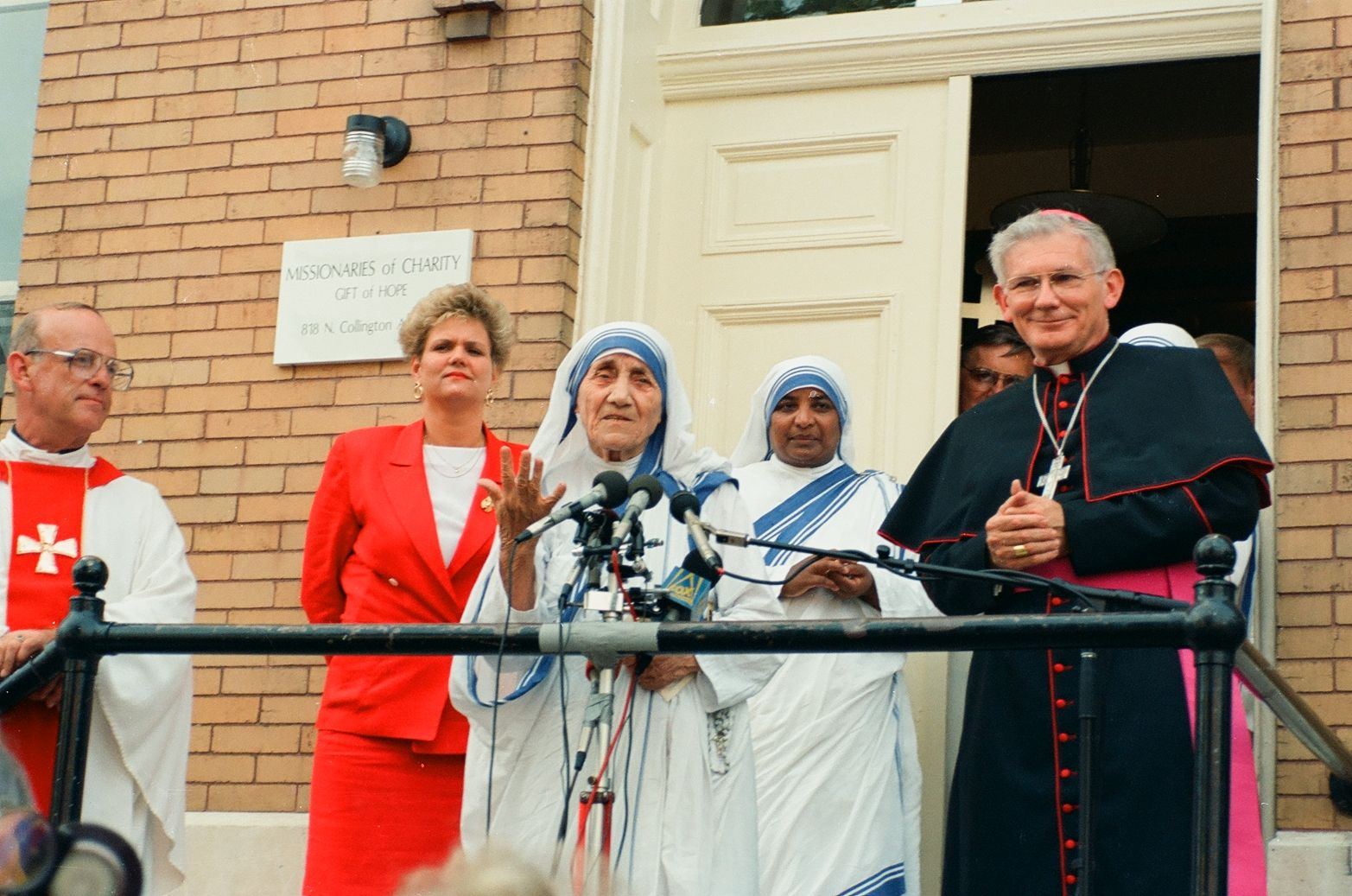
Archbishop Keeler with Mother Teresa in Baltimore (1992)

John Paul II named Keeler as the fourteenth archbishop of Baltimore on April 11, 1989, following the retirement of Archbishop William Borders. Keeler was installed in Baltimore on May 23, 1989. He was elected president of the United States Conference of Catholic Bishops (USCCB) in November 1992 for a three-year term.

In 1993, Dontee D. Stokes reported to the archdiocese that he had been fondled over a three-year period as a minor by Reverend Maurice Blackwell, pastor of St. Edward Parish in West Baltimore. Keeler then sent Blackwell to the Institute of Living in Hartford, Connecticut, for psychological evaluation and therapy. After three months, Keeler reinstated Blackwell as pastor of St. Edward in Baltimore, overruling a lay panel recommendation.

While USCCB president, Keeler helped to organize the 1993 World Youth Day in Denver, Colorado. He helped facilitate John Paul II's 1995 papal visit to Baltimore. At that time, journalist Bill Broadway of The Washington Post called Keeler "one of the most respected Catholic leaders in the United States."

John Paul II created Keeler as cardinal-priest of the Church of Santa Maria degli Angeli e dei Martiri in Rome in a consistory on November 26, 1994. That same year, the pope named him a member of the Pontifical Council for Promoting Christian Unity and the Congregation for the Oriental Churches.

Keeler in 1997 announced initiatives to curb domestic violence within the archdiocese. These included pushing for legislation at the state level, providing education in parishes and schools and tasking pastors with holding healing services for victims.

=== 2000 to 2006 ===
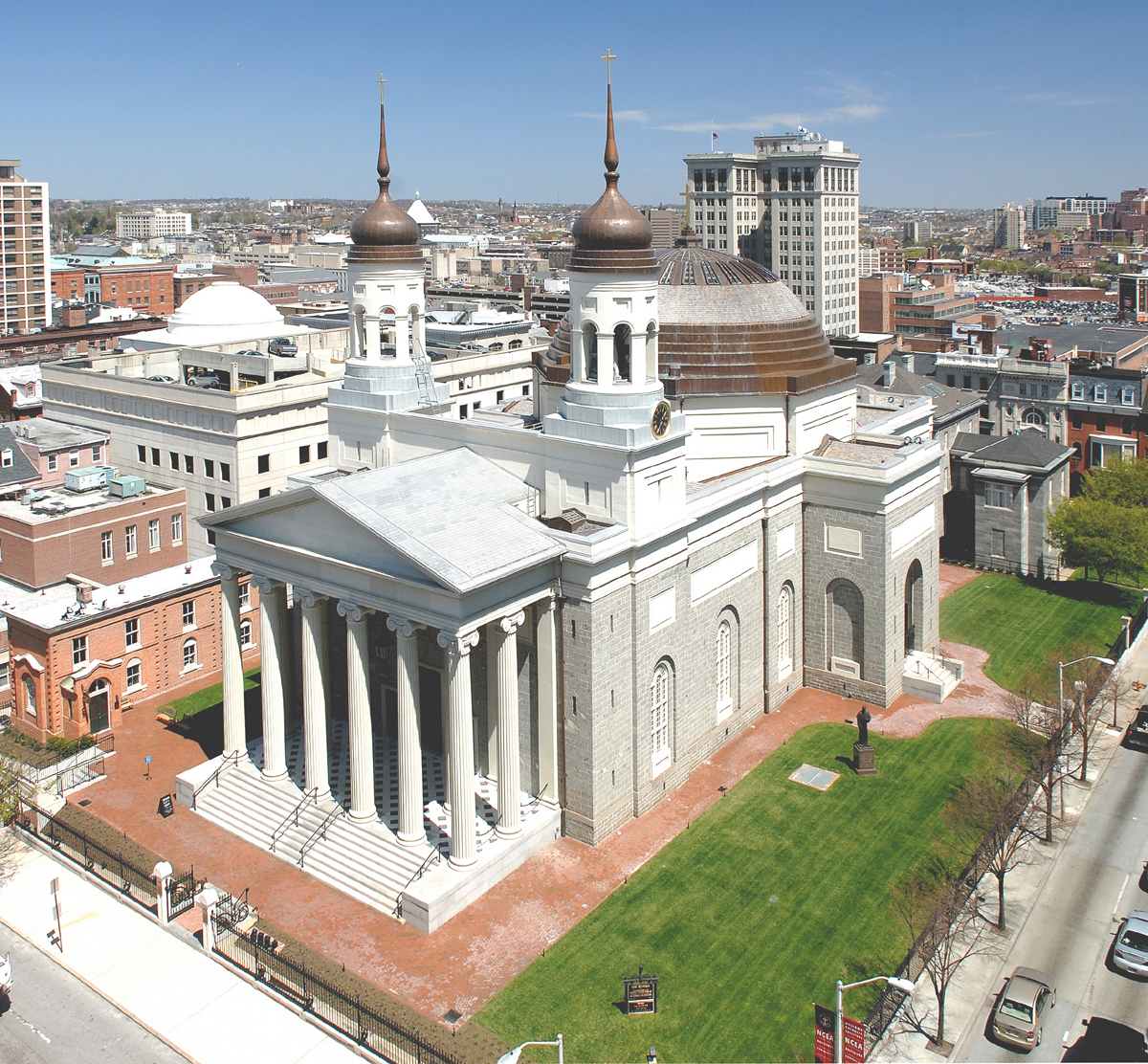
Basilica of the National Shrine of the Assumption of the Blessed Virgin Mary, Baltimore, Maryland (2007)

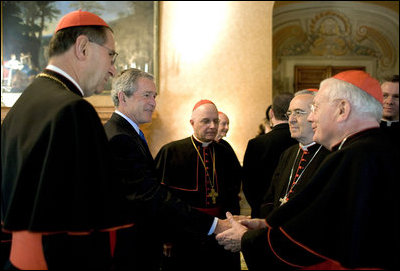
Cardinal Keeler shaking hands with U.S. President George W. Bush (2005)

From 1998 to 2001 and again from late 2003 to 2006, Keeler served as chair for the Committee on Pro-Life Activities. Keeler participated in the 2005 conclave in Rome that elected Cardinal Joseph Ratzinger as Pope Benedict XVI.

When The Boston Globe in 2002 began breaking the sexual abuse scandal in the Archdiocese of Boston, Keeler's first response was to resist the media "feeding frenzy." Several cardinals commented publicly about the issue before Keeler. Psychotherapist Richard Sipe stated that Keeler was "probably one of the most politically savvy of all the cardinals in the country. He plays things safe and is very concerned about avoiding any scandal."

Keeler, however, became the first bishop to identify publicly priests who had been "credibly accused of child abuse," listing 57 on the archdiocese website. He also detailed detailing $5.6 million that the archdiocese had spent on settlements, legal fees and counseling. Keeler called for addressing the scandal "with humble contrition, righteous anger and public outrage. Telling the truth cannot be wrong." While victims and their advocates praised him and other bishops followed his lead, "defenders of the church criticized him and the other bishops as having betrayed the priests in their dioceses," according to The New York Times. '"I think Cardinal Keeler has taken a very bold and courageous and pastorally sensitive approach," said Bishop Wilton Gregory, President of the USCCB, at the time.

In May 2002, Stokes encountered Blackwell by accident on a street in Baltimore. Blackwell had been suspended from ministry since 1998 after accusations of sexual abuse of another minor had surfaced. After a brief conversation, Stokes shot and wounded Blackwell, then turned himself in at a local church. Stokes was acquitted of all charges in December 2002. Blackwell was convicted of molesting Stokes in February 2005, but the verdict was overturned on appeal in July of that year.

Keeler was responsible for the restoration of Baltimore's Basilica of the National Shrine of the Assumption of the Blessed Virgin Mary, America's first cathedral. The $32 million for the project was raised from private donations. Construction lasted from 2004 until November 2006. The project was finished in time for the 200th anniversary of the cathedral's groundbreaking. Keeler served as grand prior of the Middle Atlantic USA Lieutenancy of the Order of the Holy Sepulchre from 2005 to 2007.

=== Retirement and legacy ===
In April 2006, Keeler, after reaching age 75, Keeler submitted his resignation as archbishop of Baltimore to the pope as required by church law. It was accepted by Benedict XVI on July 12, 2007. On March 23, 2017, Keeler died at age 86 in his residence at St. Martin's Home for the Aged, run by the Little Sisters of the Poor, in Catonsville, Maryland. He had been ill for several years.

On August 1, 2018, Bishop Ronald Gainer of Harrisburg announced that he was removing Keeler's name from any building or room in the diocese due to Keeler's failure to protect victims from abuse. On August 14, 2018, the Pennsylvania Supreme Court released a report that alleged Keeler committed criminal inaction during his time as bishop of Harrisburg.

The grand jury report stated that Keeler learned in 1987 of allegations of sexual abuse against Reverend Arthur Long. A church memo written in 1995, the year that Long was removed from ministry, revealed that accusations of "inappropriate behavior" had surfaced against Long in 1991 and 1992 during his time in the Archdiocese of Baltimore.

Immediately after the release of the Pennsylvania grand jury report, the Archdiocese of Baltimore in August 2018 cancelled plans to name a new Catholic school after Keeler due to his handling of the Long accusations.

== Viewpoints ==
=== Abortion ===
Along with other Catholic bishops, Keeler in 1994 expressed their opposition to any health care reform initiative by the federal government that included the funding of abortion services. The Baltimore Sun in 2017 called Keeler "a leading national voice" against abortion rights for women.

=== Capital punishment ===
Keeler in December 2005 visited Wesley E. Baker, an inmate on death row in Maryland. Baker had killed a woman in 1991 during a robbery in Catonsville, Maryland. Keeler said that he was going to ask Maryland Governor Bob Ehrlich to commute Baker's execution. The commutation was denied and Baker was executed that month.

=== Ecumenism ===
When John Paul II visited the United States in 1987, Keeler helped arrange his meetings with Jewish leaders in Miami, Florida and Protestant leaders in Columbia, South Carolina. However, Jewish leaders threatened to boycott the Miami meeting because John Paul II had recently met with former U.N. Secretary-General Kurt Waldheim. It had been recently revealed that Waldheim had previous connections to Nazi Germany. After Keeler intervened, the Jewish leaders agreed to attend the meeting. In 1994, the Baltimore Jewish Council presented Keeler with a silver menorah in recognition of his efforts to improve Catholic-Jewish relations.

On November 18, 2005, at the annual general assembly of the National Council of Churches, Keeler reassured delegates that the Catholic Church and Benedict XVI were firmly ecumenical.

=== Euthanasia ===
On April 1, 2005, Keeler mourned the death of Terri Schiavo in Pinellas Park, Florida, two days earlier, calling it a "human tragedy." Schiavo had been in a persistent vegetative state since suffering a cardiac arrest in 1990. After a seven-year legal battle, Schiavo's husband in 2005 was allowed by the courts to have doctors remove his wife's feeding tube.

=== LGBTQ ===
Keeler in July 2004 expressed his opposition to an initiative to legalize same-sex marriage in Maryland. He stated:

Marriage involves a faithful, exclusive, lifelong union of a man and a woman who are joined in an intimate community of life and love. As they are equal, one to the other, they also are different from one another—in God’s plan, made for each other. This complementarity, which involves sexual difference, unites them in a mutually loving relationship that is open to the procreation of children.

=== Racism ===
Keeler in December 2000 led a prayer service at the Basilica of the Assumption of the Blessed Virgin Mary in which he asked for forgiveness for racial discrimination and enslavement of African-Americans by the archdiocese in previous years.

== See also ==
- Catholic Church hierarchy
- Catholic Church in the United States
- Historical list of the Catholic bishops of the United States
- List of Catholic bishops of the United States
- Lists of patriarchs, archbishops, and bishops

Catholic Church titles
Preceded by Joseph Thomas Daley	Bishop of Harrisburg; 1983–1989	Succeeded by Nicholas C. Dattilo
Preceded by William Donald Borders	Archbishop of Baltimore; 1989–2007	Succeeded by Edwin Frederick O'Brien
New title	Grand Prior of the Order of the Holy Sepulchre (Middle Atlantic Lieutenancy); 1989–2007	Succeeded by Edwin Frederick O'Brien
