= Connerton, Pennsylvania =

Unincorporated community in Pennsylvania, US

Connerton
- Unincorporated community
- Location within the state of Pennsylvania Connerton (the United States)
- Coordinates: 40°47′58″N 76°16′25″W
- Country: United States
- State: Pennsylvania
- County: Schuylkill
- Elevation: 974 ft (297 m)
- Time zone: UTC-5 (Eastern (EST))
  - Summer (DST): UTC-4 (EDT)
- Area code: 570
- GNIS feature ID: 1172352

Connerton is an unincorporated community in Schuylkill County, Pennsylvania, United States.

== Notable person ==
- Joseph Thomas Daley, Roman Catholic bishop
