= Archdiocese of Baltimore =

Latin Catholic jurisdiction in the US

Coordinates: 39°17′38″N 76°37′02″W

Archdiocese of Baltimore Archidiœcesis Baltimorensis

Catholic
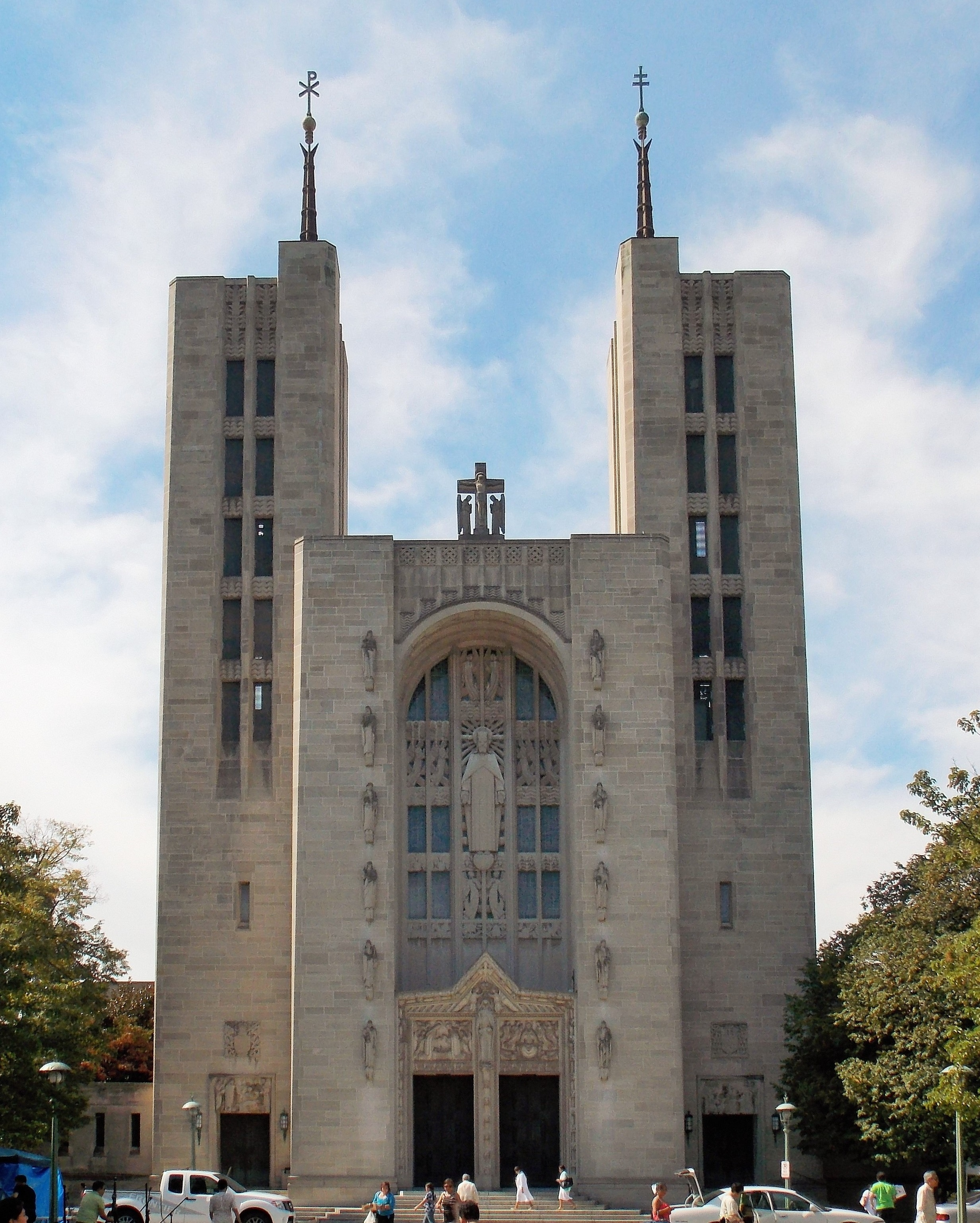
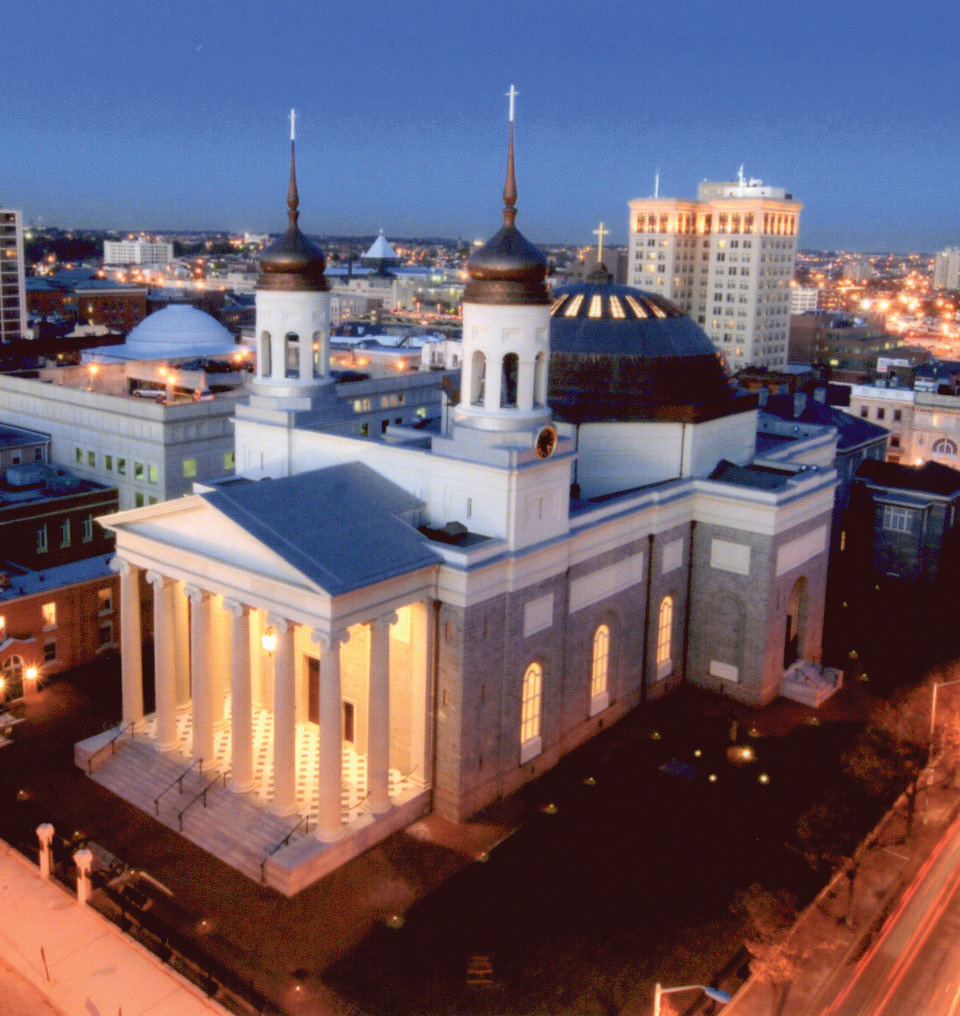
- Cathedral of Mary Our Queen Basilica of the National Shrine of the Assumption of the Blessed Virgin Mary

- Coat of arms

Location
- Country: United States
- Territory: The city of Baltimore and nine counties in central and western Maryland
- Ecclesiastical province: Baltimore

Statistics
- Area: 12,340 km^{2} (4,760 sq mi)
- Population: Total; Catholics: (as of 2023); 3,368,757; 512,500 (15.2%)
- Parishes: 137

Information
- Denomination: Catholic
- Sui iuris church: Latin Church
- Rite: Roman Rite
- Established: November 6, 1789; 237 years ago
- Cathedral: Cathedral of Mary Our Queen
- Patron saint: Immaculate Conception; St. Ignatius of Loyola

Current leadership
- Pope: Leo XIV
- Archbishop: William E. Lori
- Auxiliary Bishops: Adam J. Parker
- Episcopal Vicars: Adam Parker
- Bishops emeritus: Edwin Frederick O'Brien; Denis J. Madden

Map
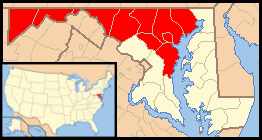

Website
- www.archbalt.org

The Archdiocese of Baltimore (Latin: Archidiœcesis Baltimorensis) is the archdiocese of the Latin Church of the Catholic Church in northern and western Maryland in the United States. It is the metropolitan see of the Ecclesiastical Province of Baltimore.

The Archdiocese of Baltimore is the oldest diocese and oldest archdiocese in the United States. Soon after the American Revolution, the diocese was erected to cover the United States, before the establishment of additional dioceses. The Vatican granted the archbishop of Baltimore the right of precedence in the nation at liturgies, meetings, and Plenary Councils in 1859. It is the premier episcopal see of the Catholic Church in the United States of America, as "prerogative of place".

As of 2020, the archdiocese had an estimated Catholic population of 525,000 with 198 diocesan priests, 193 religious priests and 169 permanent deacons in 139 parishes.

The Archdiocese of Baltimore has two major seminaries: St. Mary's Seminary and University in Baltimore and Mount St. Mary's Seminary in Emmitsburg.

== Territory ==
The Archdiocese of Baltimore comprises the City of Baltimore and nine Maryland counties: Allegany, Anne Arundel, Baltimore, Carroll, Frederick, Garrett, Harford, Howard, and Washington.

== History ==
=== 1600 to 1700 ===
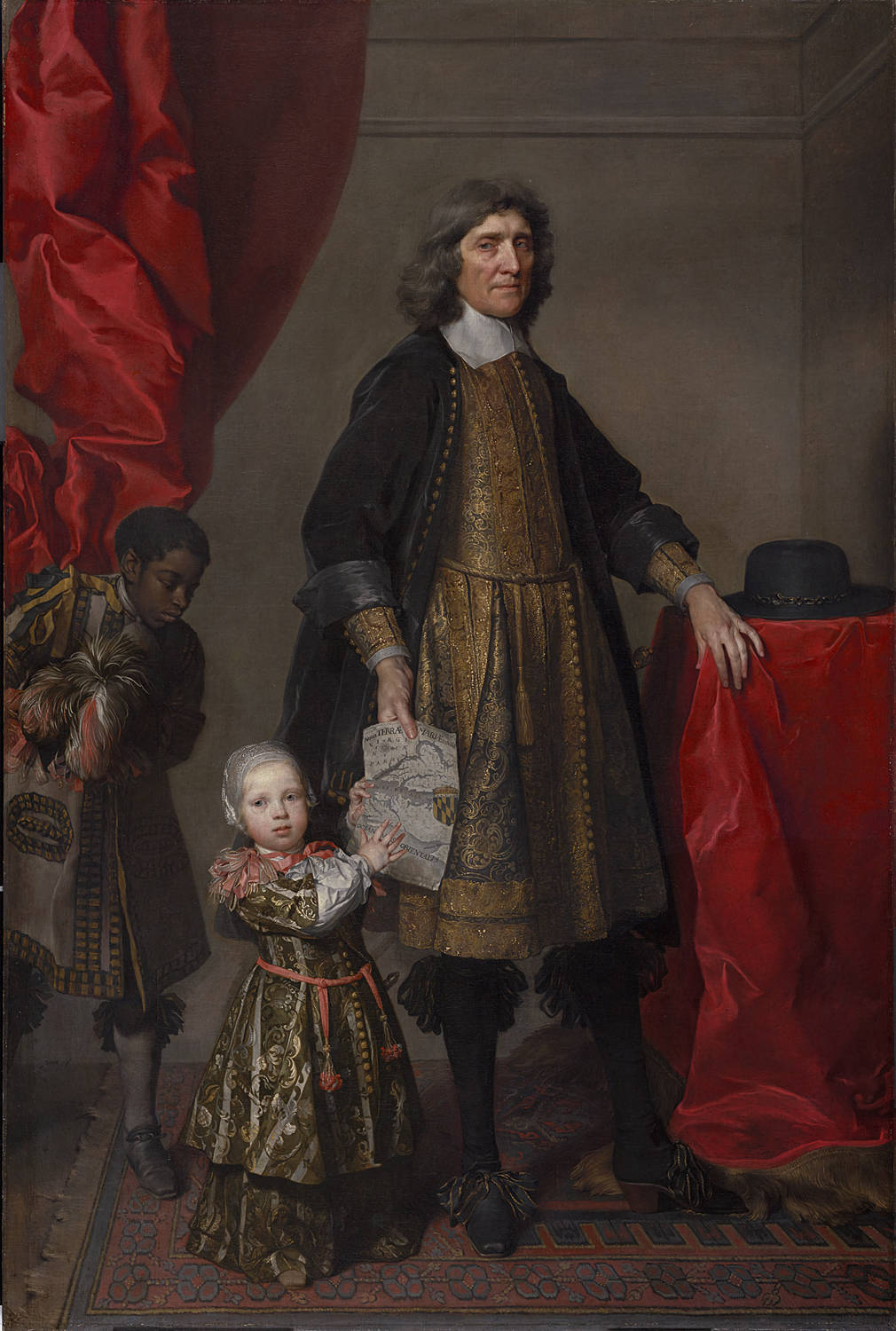
Cecil Calvert, 2nd Baron Baltimore, by Gerard Soest (circa 1670)

The first Catholic presence in the original British colonies in the United States was the proprietary colony of Maryland, established by Cecil Calvert, 2nd Baron Baltimore in 1634. A Catholic himself, Calvert intended the colony to be open to English Catholics facing persecution at home.

In 1689, members of the growing Puritan population in Maryland staged a takeover of the colonial government and effectively outlawed Catholicism. In 1691, alarmed at the violent conflicts in Maryland, the British Crown took over the colony from the Calvert family.

=== 1700 to 1789 ===
The new royal governor in Maryland imposed less sweeping restrictions on Catholics than those of the Puritan regime. These restrictions would stay in place until after the end of the American Revolution.

During the British colonial period, the small Catholic communities in the American colonies were under the ecclesiastical jurisdiction of the Apostolic Vicariate of the London District in England. The first Catholic church in Baltimore, St. Peter's, was dedicated in 1770.

In November 1783, after the end of the Revolution, the Catholic clergy in Maryland petitioned the Vatican for permission to nominate a priest as superior of the missions for the United States. The superior would have some of the powers of a bishop and be in charge of the American Catholic Church. After receiving papal approval, the clergy nominated John Carroll to become superior. Pope Pius VI in June 1784 confirmed Carroll as superior of the missions. This papal act established an American hierarchy, removing the American Catholic Church from the authority of the British Catholic Church.

In November 1784, Pius VI erected the Prefecture Apostolic of the United States (Praefectura Apostolica Civitatum Foederatarum Americae Septentrionalis) encompassing the entire country. Since Maryland had the largest Catholic population, Pope Pius VI placed the prefecture see in Baltimore and appointed Carroll as its first prefect apostolic.

=== 1789 to 1800 ===
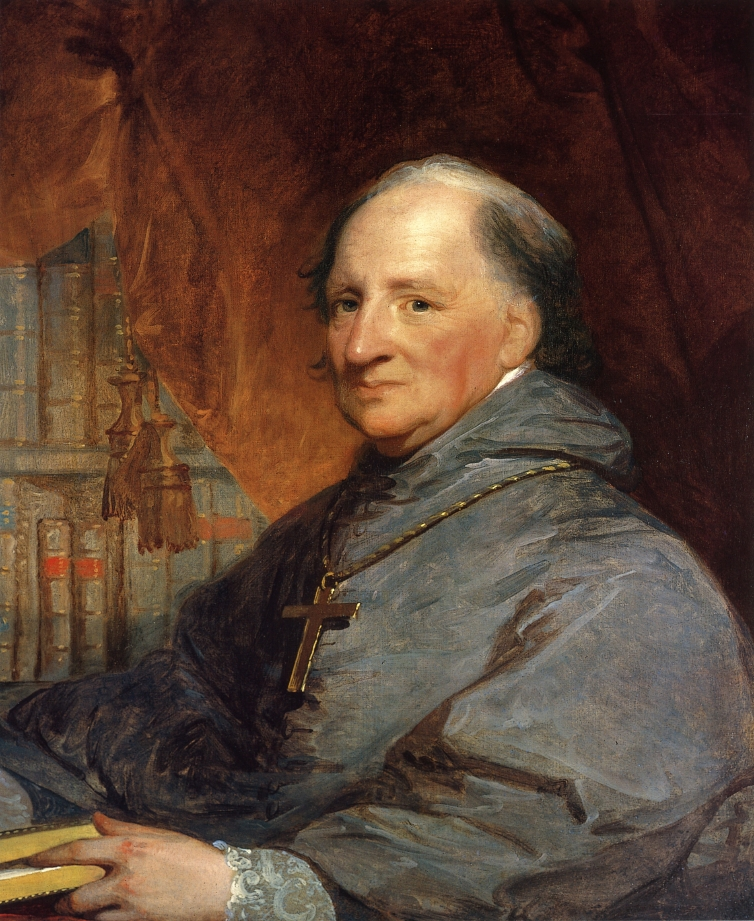
Portrait of Archbishop Carroll by Gilbert Stuart (circa 1806)

Four years later, Pius VI elevated the prefecture into the Diocese of Baltimore, making it the first diocese solely within the United States. St. Peter's, the only Catholic church in Baltimore, was designated as the pro-cathedral (temporary cathedral). The new Diocese of Baltimore covered the entire nation.

To train priests for his new diocese, Carroll asked the Fathers of the Company of Saint Sulpice to come to Baltimore. They arrived in 1791 and started the nucleus of St. Mary's College and Seminary in that city. Also in 1791, Carroll convened the first diocesan synod in the United States. Twenty-two priests attended the synod, setting national policies for baptism, confirmation, penance, the celebration of the liturgy in the mass, anointing of the sick, and mixed marriages.

The Vatican in 1795 appointed Leonard Neale as coadjutor bishop in Baltimore to assist Carroll. In 1798, Carroll won a civil case in Pennsylvania that acknowledged his position as leader of the American church. Carroll gave his approval to the founding of the Order of the Visitation of Holy Mary, who in 1799 established Visitation Academy in Georgetown.

=== 1800 to 1821 ===
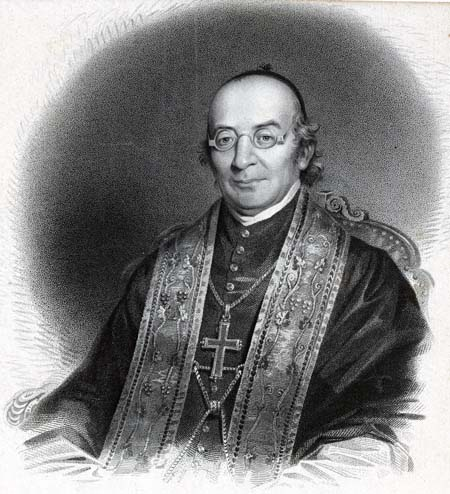
Archbishop Maréchal (pre-1890)

Carroll ordained the first American-born Catholic priest, William Matthews, at St. Peter's Pro-Cathedral in Baltimore in 1800. In 1806, Carroll started construction of the Cathedral of the Assumption in Baltimore As the Catholic population of the United States grew, the Vatican saw the need to create more dioceses. In 1808, Pope Pius VII erected four new dioceses from what now became the Archdiocese of Baltimore. The pope named Carroll as the first archbishop of Baltimore.

Name of new diocese	Territory taken from archdiocese in 1808
Diocese of Boston	Massachusetts, New Hampshire, Rhode Island, Connecticut, and Vermont
Diocese of New York	State of New York and seven counties from New Jersey
Diocese of Philadelphia	Pennsylvania, Delaware, and seven counties from New Jersey
Diocese of Bardstown	Kentucky, Tennessee, Ohio, and the Old Northwest Territory

After Carroll died in 1815, Neale automatically succeeded him as archbishop of Baltimore. However, due to Neale's bad health, Pope Pius VII in 1816 appointed Ambrose Maréchal as coadjutor archbishop. When Neale died in 1817, Maréchal succeeded him as archbishop of Baltimore.

Maréchal believed that his most pressing problem was a shortage of priests. It was aggravated by parish trustees who thought they had the power to assign these priests. In some Irish parishes, the trustees would demand Irish priests, even if they were not qualified. In 1820, Bishop Flaget of Bardstown warned Maréchal about a man claiming to be a priest who wanted to practice in the archdiocese. This individual produced positive letters of introduction from his bishop. However, when he was observed celebrating mass, it became clear that the so-called priest was incompetent. Maréchal later advised the Propaganda Fide (now the Congregation for the Evangelization of Peoples) in Rome about this problem.

=== 1821 to 1850 ===
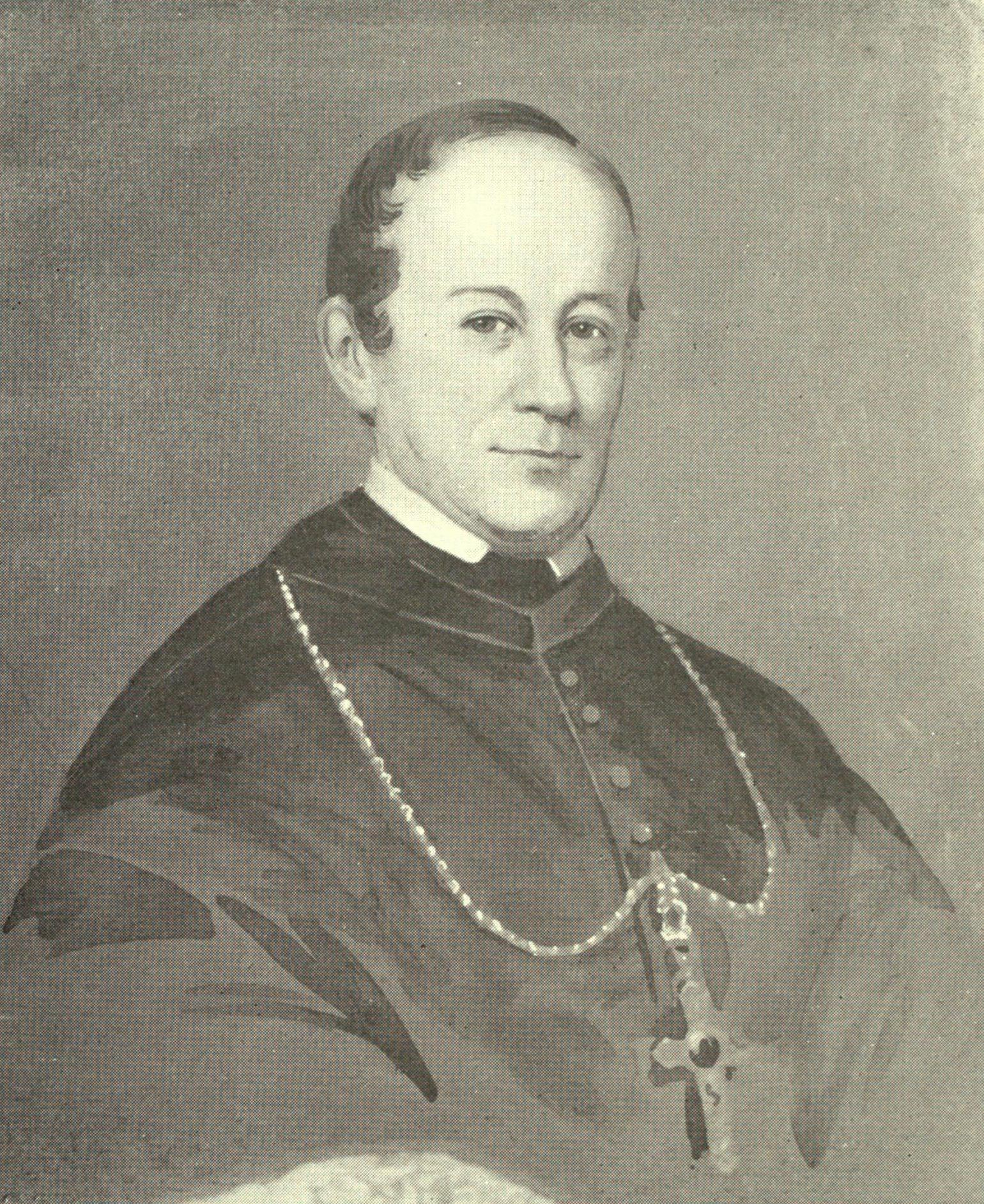
Archbishop Eccleston (1891)

Maréchal dedicated the incomplete Assumption of the Blessed Virgin Mary Cathedral in May 1821. Later in 1821, Maréchal went to Rome on archdiocese business. One problem he had faced in Maryland was the disputed ownership of the White Marsh plantation in Bowie. The Order of Jesus had received the plantation as a gift in 1728 and claimed it as their property. Maréchal said that the plantation actually belonged to the archdiocese. The Vatican gave the archdiocese ownership of White Marsh.

On January 8, 1828, James Whitfield of Baltimore was appointed coadjutor archbishop of the archdiocese by Pope Leo XII. Before Whitfield could be consecrated as coadjutor, Maréchal died on January 29, 1828. Whitfield was finally consecrated as archbishop in June 1828. He convened a synod for the diocesan clergy in 1831 and the Second Provincial Council of Baltimore in 1833. Throughout his tenure, Whitfield worked for the welfare of the African American community. He authorized the foundation of the Oblate Sisters of Providence, the first religious order of African-American women in the United States. Whitfield talked about how he would have liked to evangelize the hundreds of thousands of enslaved African-Americans in Virginia.

Pope Gregory XVI in March 1834 appointed Samuel Eccleston as coadjutor archbishop to assist Whitfield. When Whitfield died in October 1834, Eccleston automatically succeeded him as archbishop. Eccleston encouraged religious orders to establish mother houses in his diocese, particularly those orders that could provide social services to the growing number of Catholic immigrants in the industrializing cities. The Sisters of the Visitation increased the number of their academies in the city and the archdiocese, the Brothers of St. Patrick opened a trade school near Baltimore, and the Redemptorists provided services for German-speaking immigrants. The Brothers of the Christian Schools founded Calvert Hall School in 1845 in Baltimore.

In 1847, Eccleston was planning to disband the Oblate Sisters of Providence, but was dissuaded by Redemptorist Father Thaddeus Anwander. St. Charles College was established in 1848 in Howard County on land donated by the planter Charles Carroll. Between 1837 and 1849, Eccleston held five provincial councils in Baltimore. He also started several new parishes during his administration. Eccleston died in 1851.

=== 1850 to 1866 ===
The Vatican continued to erect new dioceses and vicariates out of the Archdiocese of Baltimore through the 19th century as the church evolved and grew in the United States.

Name of new diocese	Date of new diocese	Territory taken from archdiocese
Diocese of Charleston	1820	North Carolina, South Carolina, and Georgia
Diocese of Richmond	1820	Most of Virginia
Vicariate Apostolic of Mississippi and Alabama	1822	Mississippi and Alabama
Vicariate Apostolic of the Oregon Territory	1843	From California to Alaska and from the Rocky Mountains to the Pacific Ocean
Diocese of Richmond	1858	Alexandria, Virginia
Diocese of Wilmington	1868	Maryland eastern shore and the remaining Virginia counties

Following the death of Eccleston, Bishop Francis Kenrick of Philadelphia was named the sixth archbishop of Baltimore by Pope Pius IX in 1851. He presided over the First Plenary Council of Baltimore in 1852. As archbishop, Kenrick expanded parochial schools throughout the archdiocese. Under his tenure, parochial schools were free for all students, and were supported directly by the parishes. Kenrick died in 1863. The next archbishop of Baltimore was Bishop Martin Spalding from the Diocese of Louisville, appointed by Pope Pius IX.

=== 1866 to 1900 ===
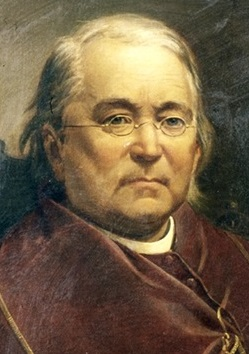
Archbishop Spalding (19th century)

In 1866, Spalding founded St. Mary's Industrial School in Baltimore, a boys reformatory. Spalding conducted a visitation of the archdiocese, during which he reportedly administered confirmation to 8,000 people. Spalding recruited priests for the archdiocese from All Hallows College in Ireland and the American College at Louvain in Belgium He also organized the Society of Saint Vincent de Paul as well as the Association of St. Joseph, a society for the care of impoverished girls.

After the end of the American Civil War in 1865, Spalding raised $10,000 in the archdiocese for relief efforts in the former Confederate States of America. He also took a special interest in the spiritual welfare of the African-Americans who had just been freed from slavery. Writing to Archbishop John McCloskey, Spalding said, "Four million of these unfortunates are thrown on our charity, and they silently but eloquently appeal to us for help." He invited Herbert Vaughan and the Mill Hill Fathers from England to minister exclusively among freedmen. In October 1866, Spalding presided over the Second Plenary Council of Baltimore.

After Spalding died in 1871, Pius IX appointed bishop James Bayley from the Diocese of Newark as the next archbishop of Baltimore in 1872. He convened the Eighth Provincial Synod in 1875 and enacted new regulations on clerical dress, mixed marriages, and church music. Bayley consecrated the cathedral in 1876 and retired a large amount of archdiocesan debt. In May 1877, Pius IX selected Bishop James Gibbons of Richmond as coadjutor archbishop to assist the sick Bayley. After Bayley died in October 1877, Gibbons succeeded him as archbishop of Baltimore. In 1884, Gibbons founded the House of the Good Shepherd in Baltimore, a reformatory for female criminals.

=== 1900 to 1940 ===
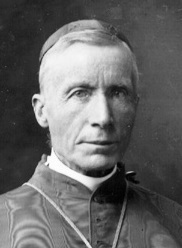
Archbishop Gibbons (circa 1900)

After the end of World War I in 1919, Gibbons supported American participation in the new League of Nations. He was initially opposed to the women's suffrage movement in the United States. However, when the nineteenth amendment to the US Constitution passed in 1920, allowing women to vote, Gibbons urged women to exercise that right, describing it "...not only as a right but as a strict social duty." Gibbons died in 1921

Bishop Michael Curley of the Diocese of Saint Augustine was the next archbishop of Baltimore, named by Pope Benedict XV in 1921. His arrival in his new city was described in the press as "one of the greatest welcomes ever tendered a new citizen of Baltimore." During his tenure in Baltimore, Curley established 66 schools, placing the importance of constructing schools over churches. In 1926, he declared, "I defy any system of grammar school education in the United States to prove itself superior to the system that is being maintained in the Archdiocese of Baltimore." He also established diocesan offices for Catholic Charities in 1923 and for the Society for the Propagation of the Faith in 1925.

In 1939, Pope Pius XII erected the Archdiocese of Washington, taking the District of Columbia and five nearby Maryland counties from the Archdiocese of Baltimore. The pope selected Curley to serve as archbishop of Washington. The two archdioceses now shared the same archbishop. Curley used the title of Archbishop of Baltimore-Washington during this period, although the two archdioceses were separate entities.

=== 1940 to 1989 ===
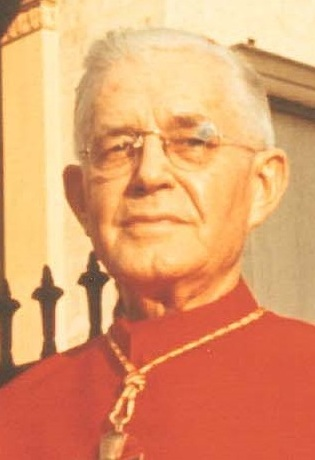
Archbishop Shehan (2014)

After Curley died in 1947, Pius XII appointed Monsignor Patrick A. O'Boyle as archbishop of Washington and Bishop Francis Keough of the Diocese of Providence as archbishop of Baltimore. During the 14 years of Keough's administration, the Catholic population of the archdiocese grew from 265,000 to 400,000. Keough dedicated the new Cathedral of Mary Our Queen in Baltimore in 1959; he also built many new schools, homes, and orphanages.

In July 1961, Pope John XXIII named Bishop Lawrence Shehan of the Diocese of Bridgeport to assist Keough as coadjutor archbishop. When Keough died in December 1961, Shehan automatically succeeded him as archbishop of Baltimore. Shehan was a strong supporter of the American Civil Rights movement. He banned racial segregation in all of the archdiocesan institutions in 1962 and participated in the 1963 March on Washington for Jobs and Freedom. Shehan also maintained good relations with the Jewish and Eastern Orthodox communities in the archdiocese. Shehan worked with his friend Harry Lee Doll, Episcopal Bishop of Maryland, on both civil rights and ecumenical issues. Along with the president of St. Mary's Seminary and University, Shehan and Doll in 1968 founded the Ecumenical Institute at St. Mary's.

Following Shehan's retirement in 1974, Pope Paul VI named Bishop William Borders of the Diocese of Orlando as the 13th archbishop of Baltimore that same year.

During his 15-year tenure in Baltimore, Borders divided the archdiocese into three vicariates and appointed his auxiliary bishops as vicars over them. He reorganized the Archdiocesan Central Services, naming cabinet-level secretaries to carry out the administrative work of the archdiocese. Borders clarified and strengthened the role of the archdiocesan pastoral council, and combined the board of consultors and the priests senate to form the priests' council. He initiated a Department of Pastoral Planning and Management, an Office of Fund Development and an evangelization effort. Instead of residing at an apartment at the Basilica of the Assumption, Borders lived alone at the former sexton's lodge. Borders became what Baltimore Magazine called the "king of the soup kitchens". While he was archbishop, the budget for Catholic Charities grew from $2.5 million a year to $33 million a year, and its staff expanded from 200 to over 1,000. Borders retired in 1989.

=== 1989 to present ===
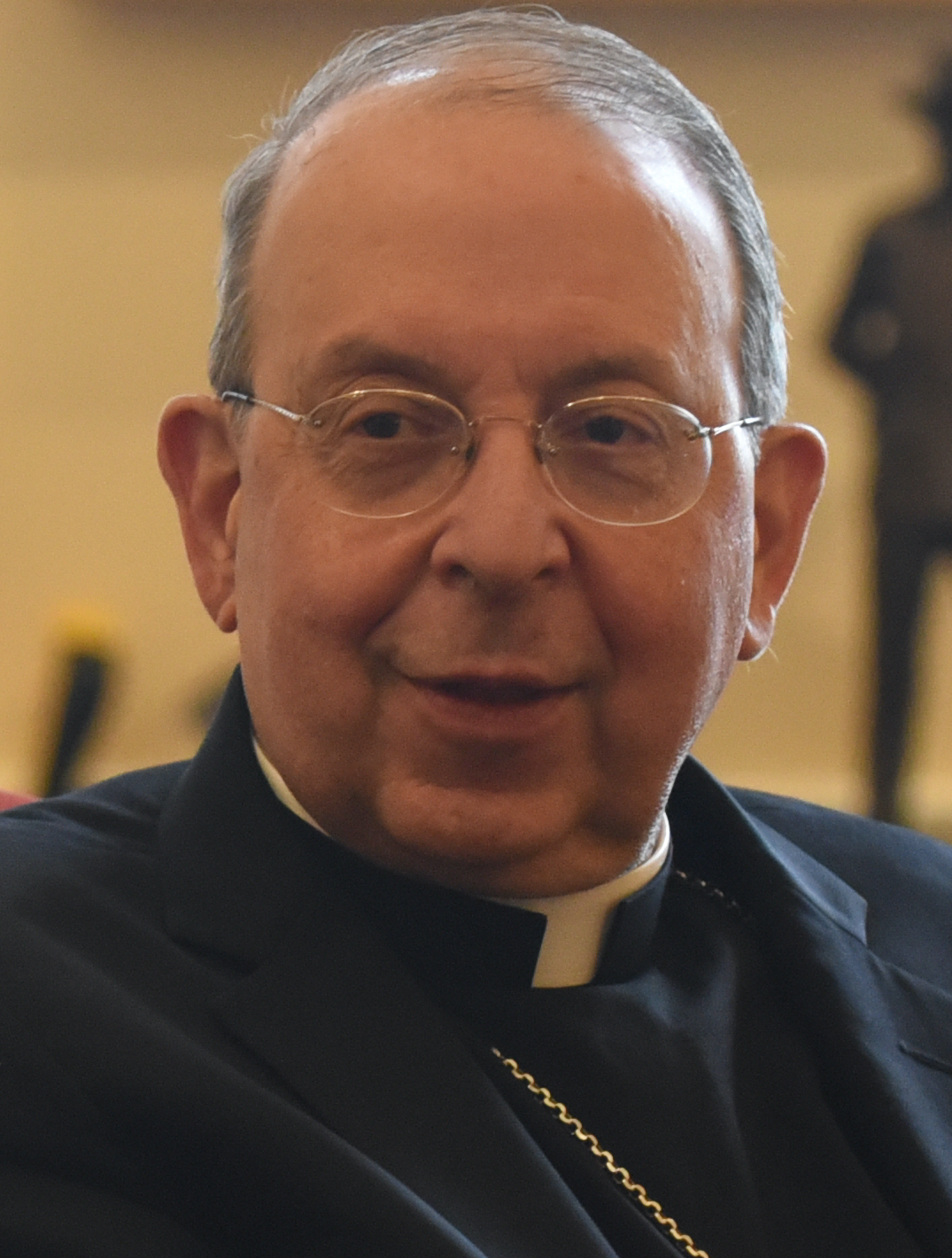
Archbishop Lori (2022)

Pope John Paul II appointed Bishop William H. Keeler from the Diocese of Harrisburg as the next archbishop of Baltimore in 1989. Keeler was responsible for the restoration of the Basilica of the National Shrine of the Assumption of the Blessed Virgin Mary.

In July 1995, John Merzbacher, a teacher at Catholic Community Middle School in south Baltimore, received four life sentences after being convicted of raping Elizabeth Ann Murphy at the school in the 1970s. At the time, prosecutors also found evidence that Merzbacher sexually abused 13 other male and female students when he taught there. Merzbacher died in prison in May 2023.

After Keeler retired in 2006, John Paul II replaced him with Archbishop Edwin O'Brien from the Archdiocese for the Military Services, USA. In 2008, O'Brien dedicated the Pope John Paul II Prayer Garden in Baltimore, which he called a "sanctuary in a suffering city." In 2011, he became grand master of the Equestrian Order of the Holy Sepulchre of Jerusalem in Rome.

In 2012, Bishop William E. Lori of Bridgeport was appointed archbishop of Baltimore by Pope Benedict XVI. In 2016, the archdiocese confirmed that it had paid a total of $472,000 to settlements to 16 former students of Archbishop Keough High School. The plaintiffs claimed to have been sexually abused as children by A. Joseph Maskell from 1967 to 1975. After the archdiocese removed Maskell from ministry in 1994, he fled to Ireland. He was never charged with any crimes."

A report released by Pennsylvania Attorney General Josh Shapiro in August 2018 singled out Cardinal William Keeler for criticism. When Keeler was archbishop of Baltimore, he allowed Arthur Long to transfer from the Diocese of Harrisburg to the Archdiocese of Baltimore. Long had been accused of sexually abusing children during his time in Harrisburg when Keeler was bishop there. After the grand jury report was released, the archdiocese canceled plans to name a new elementary school after Keeler.

In 2019, Lori released The Journey to Racial Justice: Repentance, Healing and Action. The document acknowledged racism in the Catholic Church and suggested measures to combat it. That same year, Lori instituted an initiative for reporting allegations against any bishop in the archdiocese. The policy was drafted by the archdiocesan independent review board. In February 2019, Maryland Attorney General Brian Frosh launched an investigation into sexual abuse allegations against the archdiocese. Archbishop Lori provided Frosh with over 50,000 pages of internal documents dating back to 1965.

In March 2019, Lori banned former Auxiliary Bishop Gordon Bennett, then residing in the archdiocese, from practicing any form of ministry in the archdiocese or the suffragan Diocese of Wheeling–Charleston. Bennett had been accused of sexual abuse in 2006. In April 2019, the archdiocese added the names of 23 deceased clergy to a list of accused clergy which the archdiocese published in 2002. Long, a Jesuit, was among those added to the list.

The State of Maryland investigation concluded in November 2022, and its report was released in April 2023. The report named 156 archdiocesan employees and clergy as having credible accusations of sexually abusing more than 600 children between 1940 and 2002. At the same time as the release of the report, the Maryland General Assembly passed a bill to end a statute of limitations on abuse-related civil lawsuits. This bill was signed into law by Governor Wes Moore in April 2023. On September 29, 2023, the Archdiocese of Baltimore filed for Chapter 11 bankruptcy, anticipating financial losses in upcoming lawsuits permitted by the Maryland Child Victims Act starting on October 1.

As of 2026, Lori is the current archbishop of Baltimore.

=== Plenary councils of Baltimore ===
Third Plenary Council of Baltimore

The Plenary Councils of Baltimore were three national meetings of American Catholic bishops in the 19th century.

- First Plenary Council (1852) – The First Council published a decree requiring priests immigrating to the United States to provide letters of reference from their previous bishops before they could practise ministry in this country. The council also passed a requirement that Catholic engaged couples publish marriage banns.
- Second Plenary Council (1866) – The Second Council advocated the churching of women, a ceremony blessing women after childbirth, and setting age 10 as the age for first communion.
- Third Plenary Council (1884) – The Third Council set six holy days of obligation for Catholics and appointed a commission to draft a catechism.

== Episcopate ==
=== Prerogative of place ===
In 1858, the Sacred Congregation for the Propagation of the Faith (Propaganda Fide), with the approval of Pius IX, conferred "Prerogative of Place" on the Archdiocese of Baltimore. This decree gave the archbishop of Baltimore precedence over all other American archbishops in councils, gatherings, and meetings. It did not matter if another archbishop had been elevated sooner or had been serving long. However, a cardinal still had precedence over the archbishop of Baltimore.

=== Cathedrals ===
The first cathedral for the archdiocese was St. Peter's Pro-Cathedral, which is no longer standing. Today, like only a few other archdioceses in the United States, the Archdiocese of Baltimore has two cathedrals, both in Baltimore: the Cathedral of Mary Our Queen and the Basilica of the National Shrine of the Assumption of the Blessed Virgin Mary. The archbishop is considered the pastor of both co-cathedrals, appointing rectors to operate them.

==== St. Peter's Pro-Cathedral ====
St. Peters served as the base for the archbishop of Baltimore from 1790 to 1821. Since it never met the physical criteria for a proper cathedral and was always considered temporary, St. Peter's was termed a pro-cathedral. The building was razed in 1841.

==== Basilica of the National Shrine of the Assumption of the Blessed Virgin Mary ====
Assumption of the Blessed Virgin Mary was constructed between 1806 and 1821. It was the first cathedral in the newly independent United States and is considered the mother church of the country. It is a co-cathedral of the archdiocese.

==== Cathedral of Mary Our Queen ====
Mary Our Queen was started in 1954 and completed in 1959. It is a co-cathedral of the archdiocese.

== Bishops ==
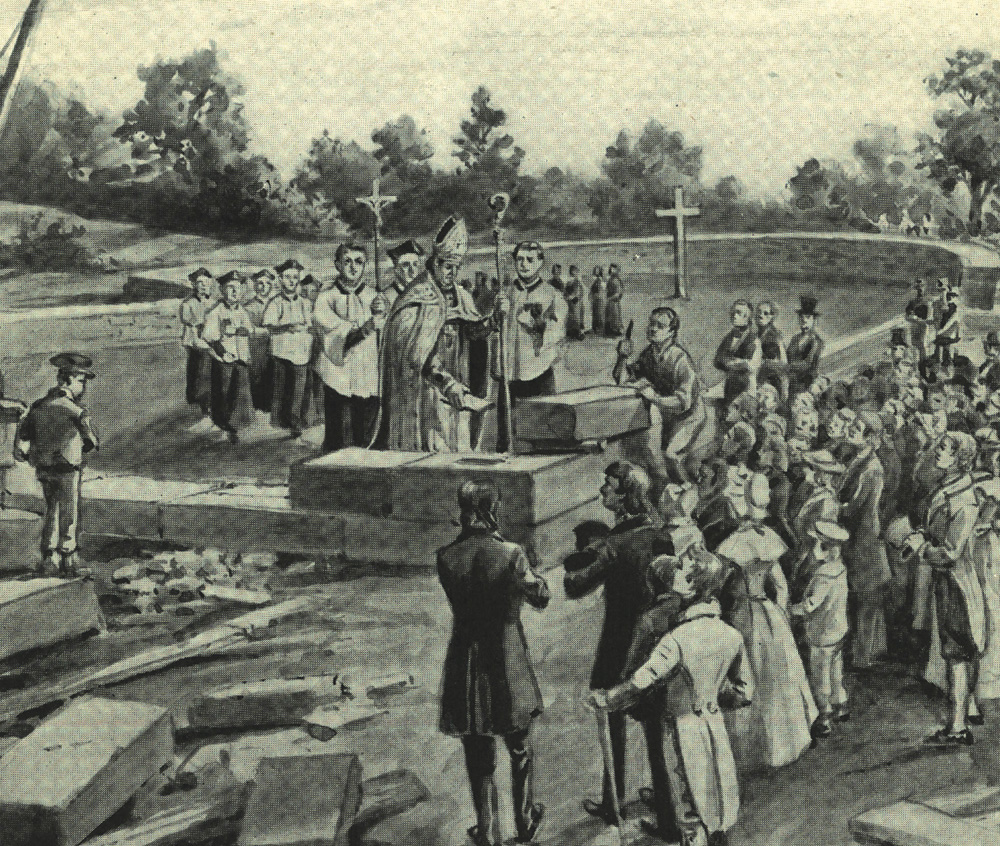
Bishop Carroll laying cornerstone for Cathedral of the Assumption in Baltimore (1806).

=== Prefect Apostolic of the United States ===
John Carroll (1784–1789), appointed first diocesan bishop with erection of diocese

=== Bishop of Baltimore ===
1. John Carroll (1789–1808), elevated to Archbishop

=== Archbishops of Baltimore ===
1. John Carroll (1808–1815)
2. Leonard Neale (1815–1817; coadjutor archbishop 1795–1815)
3. Ambrose Maréchal (1817–1828)
4. James Whitfield (1828–1834; coadjutor archbishop 1828)
5. Samuel Eccleston (1834–1851; coadjutor archbishop 1834)
6. Francis Patrick Kenrick (1851–1863)
7. Martin John Spalding (1864–1872)
8. James Roosevelt Bayley (1872–1877)
9. James Gibbons (1877–1921) (Cardinal in 1886)
10. Michael Joseph Curley (1921–1947)
11. Francis Patrick Keough (1948–1961)
12. Lawrence Shehan (1961–1974; coadjutor archbishop 1961) (Cardinal in 1965)
13. William Donald Borders (1974–1989)
14. William Henry Keeler (1989–2007) (Cardinal in 1994)
15. Edwin Frederick O'Brien (2007–2012), appointed Grand Master of the Equestrian Order of the Holy Sepulchre (Cardinal in 2012)
16. William Edward Lori (2012–present)

=== Current auxiliary bishops ===
- Adam J. Parker (2017–present)

=== Former auxiliary bishops ===
- Alfred Allen Paul Curtis (1897–1908), previously appointed Bishop of Wilmington
- Owen Patrick Bernard Corrigan (1909–1929)
- Thomas Joseph Shahan (1914–1932)
- John Michael McNamara (1928–1947), appointed Auxiliary Bishop of Washington
- Lawrence Joseph Shehan (1945–1953), appointed Bishop of Bridgeport; later returned as Coadjutor Archbishop of Baltimore and succeeded to see (see "Archbishops" above); future Cardinal
- Jerome Aloysius Daugherty Sebastian (1954–1960)
- Thomas Austin Murphy (1962–1984)
- Thomas Joseph Mardaga (1967–1968), appointed Bishop of Wilmington
- Francis Joseph Gossman (1968–1975), appointed Bishop of Raleigh
- Philip Francis Murphy (1976–1999)
- James Francis Stafford (1976–1982), appointed Bishop of Memphis and later Archbishop of Denver, President of the Pontifical Council for the Laity, and Major Penitentiary of the Apostolic Penitentiary (elevated to Cardinal in 1998)
- William Clifford Newman (1984–2003)
- John Ricard (1984–1997), appointed Bishop of Pensacola-Tallahassee
- Gordon Dunlap Bennett (1998–2004), appointed Bishop of Mandeville
- William Francis Malooly (2001–2008), appointed Bishop of Wilmington
- Mitchell T. Rozanski (2004–2014), appointed Bishop of Springfield in Massachusetts
- Denis J. Madden (2005–2016)
- Mark E. Brennan (2017–2019), appointed Bishop of Wheeling-Charleston
- Bruce Lewandowski (2020–2025), appointed Bishop of Providence

=== Other diocesan priests who became bishops ===
- John J. Chanche, appointed Bishop of Natchez in 1841
- Ignatius A. Reynolds, appointed Bishop of Charleston in 1843
- Henry B. Coskery, appointed Bishop of Portland in 1853; did not take effect
- William Henry Elder, appointed Bishop of Natchez in 1857 and Archbishop of Cincinnati in 1883
- Thomas Albert Andrew Becker, appointed Bishop of Wilmington in 1868 and Bishop of Savannah in 1886
- Thomas Patrick Roger Foley, appointed Coadjutor Bishop of Chicago in 1870
- John Joseph Keane, appointed Bishop of Richmond in 1878, rector of The Catholic University of America in 1886, and Archbishop of Dubuque in 1900
- Mark Stanislaus Gross, appointed vicar apostolic of North Carolina in 1880; resigned the episcopate c. 1881
- Jeremiah O'Sullivan, appointed Bishop of Mobile in 1885
- John Samuel Foley, appointed Bishop of Detroit in 1888
- Placide Louis Chapelle, appointed Coadjutor Archbishop of Santa Fe in 1891 (succeeded to that see in 1894), Archbishop of New Orleans in 1897 and Apostolic Delegate to Cuba and Extraordinary Envoy to Puerto Rico and the Philippines in 1898
- Patrick James Donahue, appointed Bishop of Wheeling in 1894
- William Thomas Russell, appointed Bishop of Charleston in 1916
- William Joseph Hafey, appointed Bishop of Raleigh in 1925 and Bishop of Scranton in 1938
- Thomas Joseph Toolen, appointed Bishop of Mobile in 1927
- Peter Leo Ireton, appointed Coadjutor Bishop of Richmond in 1935 and Bishop of Richmond in 1945
- John Joyce Russell, appointed Bishop of Charleston in 1950 and later Bishop of Richmond in 1958
- Philip Matthew Hannan (priest of this archdiocese, 1939–1947), appointed Auxiliary Bishop of Washington in 1956 and Archbishop of New Orleans in 1965
- Michael William Hyle, appointed Coadjutor Bishop of Wilmington in 1958 (succeeded to that see in 1960)
- John Selby Spence (priest of this archdiocese, 1933–1947), appointed auxiliary bishop of Washington in 1964
- Edward John Herrmann (priest of this archdiocese, 1947), appointed auxiliary bishop of Washington in 1966 and Bishop of Columbus in 1973
- Victor Benito Galeone, appointed Bishop of Saint Augustine in 2001
- F. Richard Spencer, appointed Auxiliary Bishop for the Military Services, USA in 2010

=== Priests appointed, but never ordained, as bishops ===
Dominic Laurence Grässel appointed Coadjutor Archbishop of Baltimore in 1793 but the notice arrived after his death

== Notable individuals ==
- Elizabeth Ann Seton - Seton founded the first American congregation of religious sisters, the Sisters of Charity of St. Joseph, in Emmitsburg, Maryland, in 1809. A year later, she opened the first free Catholic school for girls in the United States. In 1975, Seton became the first American-born person to be canonized a saint.
- Mary Lange - Lange opened a free school in her Baltimore home for African American children who were denied access to other schools in the city. In 1828, Lange founded the Oblate Sisters of Providence, the first sustained religious order for African American women in the United States. She also opened what would later become St. Frances Academy, the first Catholic School for African-American children in the United States. In 1991, the Catholic Church opened a cause of sainthood for Lange, naming her a "servant of God."

== Education ==
As of 2023, the Archdiocese of Baltimore had 40 elementary and middle schools and 18 high schools with a total student enrollment of approximately 24,000.

=== High schools ===
School	Location	Gender	Diocesan or independent
Archbishop Curley High School	Baltimore	Boys	Diocesan
Archbishop Spalding High School	Severn	Coed	Diocesan
Bishop Walsh School	Cumberland	Coed	Diocesan
Calvert Hall College	Baltimore / Towson	Boys	Independent
Cristo Rey Jesuit High School	Baltimore	Coed	Independent
Loyola Blakefield	Baltimore / Towson	Boys	Independent
Maryvale Preparatory School	Brooklandville	Girls	Independent
Mercy High School	Baltimore	Girls	Independent
Mount de Sales Academy	Baltimore / Catonsville	Girls	Independent
Mount Saint Joseph College	Baltimore / Irvington	Boys	Independent
Notre Dame Preparatory School	Baltimore / Towson	Girls	Independent
Our Lady of Mount Carmel High School	Baltimore	Coed	Diocesan
St. Frances Academy	Baltimore	Coed	Diocesan
St. John's Catholic Preparatory	Buckeystown/ Frederick County	Coed	Independent
St. Mary's High School	Annapolis	Coed	Parish
The Catholic High School of Baltimore	Baltimore	Girls	Independent
The John Carroll School	Bel Air	Coed	Independent

== Churches ==
- Basilica of the National Shrine of the Assumption of the Blessed Virgin Mary (old Baltimore Cathedral / Cathedral of the Assumption of Mary) – Baltimore, Maryland
- Basilica of the National Shrine of St. Elizabeth Ann Seton – Emmitsburg, Maryland

== Media ==
The archdiocese began to publish its diocesan newspaper, The Baltimore Catholic Review in 1913 as the successor to the earlier diocesan publication The Catholic Mirror, published 1833 to 1908. The name has since been shortened to The Catholic Review. It changed from weekly to biweekly publication in 2012 and transformed again to a monthly magazine in December 2015.

== Ecclesiastical province ==
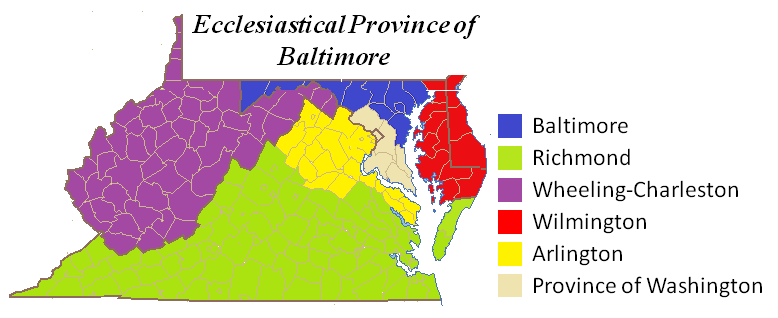
Ecclesiastical province of Baltimore

When the Archdiocese of Baltimore was erected in 1808, its ecclesiastical province covered the entire nation. In 1847, with the erected of the Archdiocese of St. Louis, the ecclesiastical province of Baltimore shrank. It shrank again with the creation of the Archdioceses of Cincinnati, New Orleans, New York, and the Portland in Oregon in 1850. The province currently contains the following suffragan dioceses:

- Diocese of Arlington
- Diocese of Richmond
- Diocese of Wheeling-Charleston
- Diocese of Wilmington

== See also ==
- Historical list of the Catholic bishops of the United States
- List of the Catholic dioceses of the United States
- List of Roman Catholic archdioceses (by country and continent)
- List of Roman Catholic dioceses (alphabetical) (including archdioceses)
- List of Roman Catholic dioceses (structured view) (including archdioceses)
- List of shrines
- The Keepers
