= William E. Lori =

American Catholic prelate (born 1951)

His Excellency The Most Reverend William Edward Lori
- Archbishop of Baltimore
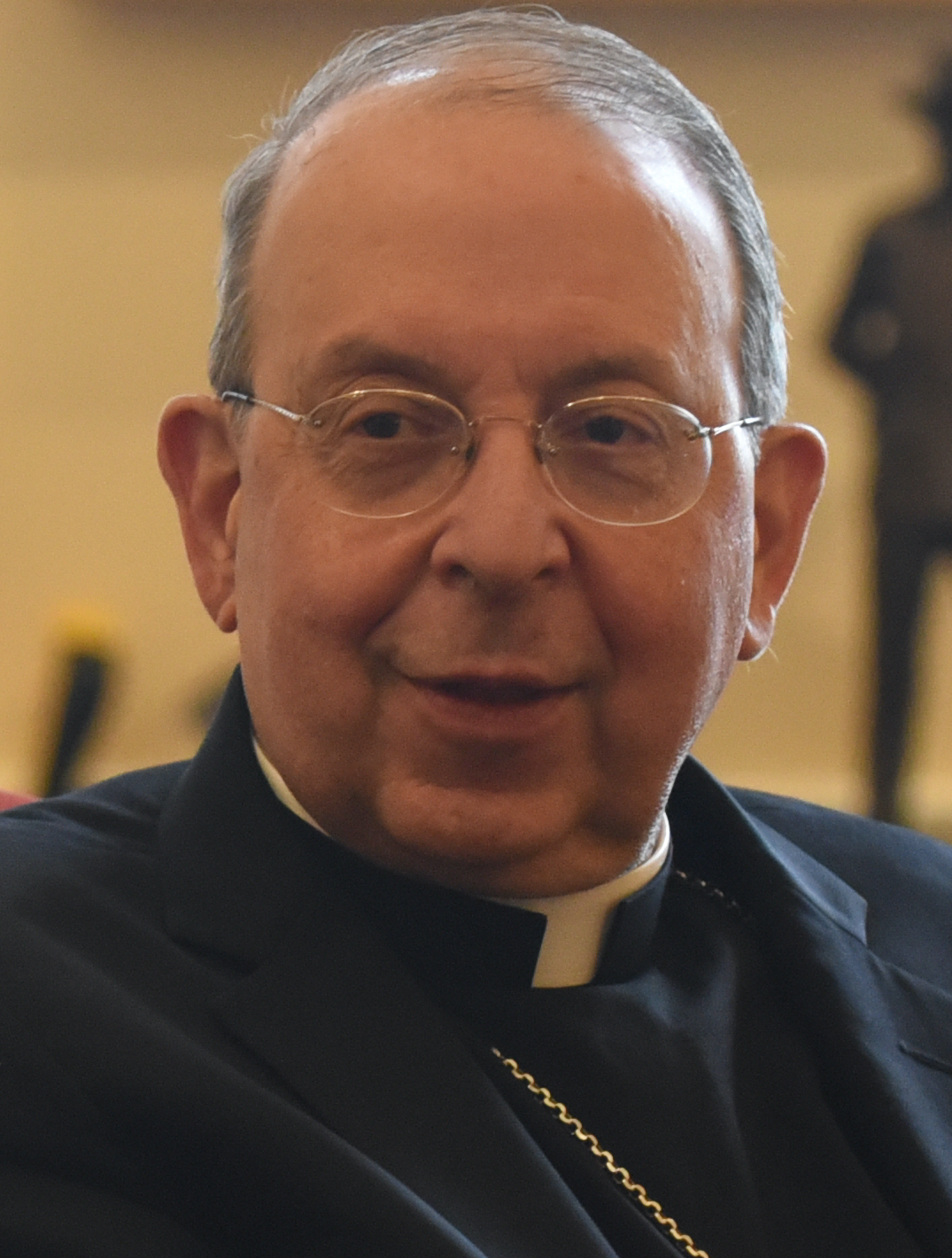
- Church: Catholic
- Archdiocese: Baltimore
- Appointed: March 20, 2012
- Installed: May 16, 2012
- Predecessor: Edwin Frederick O'Brien
- Previous posts: Bishop of Bridgeport (2001‍–‍2012); Auxiliary Bishop of Washington (1995‍–‍2001); Titular Bishop of Bulla (1995‍–‍2001)

Orders
- Ordination: May 14, 1977 by William Wakefield Baum
- Consecration: April 20, 1995 by James Aloysius Hickey

Personal details
- Born: May 6, 1951 (age 75) Louisville, Kentucky, U.S.
- Education: Seminary of Saint Pius X; Mount Saint Mary's Seminary
- Motto: Caritas in veritate (Latin for 'Charity in truth')

Styles of William E. Lori
- Reference style: The Most Reverend
- Spoken style: Your Excellency
- Religious style: Archbishop
- Posthumous style: n/a

William Edward Lori (born May 6, 1951) is an American Catholic prelate who has served as archbishop of Baltimore in Maryland since 2012.

Lori previously served as bishop of Bridgeport in Connecticut from 2001 to 2012, and as an auxiliary bishop of the Archdiocese of Washington in the District of Columbia from 1995 to 2001. He was vice-president of the United States Conference of Catholic Bishops (USCCB) from 2022 to 2025.

== Biography ==
=== Education ===
William Lori was born in Louisville, Kentucky, on May 6, 1951, to Francis and Margaret Lori. He attended the Seminary of Saint Pius X in Erlanger, Kentucky, receiving a Bachelor of Arts in 1973. He then earned a master's degree from Mount Saint Mary's Seminary in Emmitsburg, Maryland, in 1977.

=== Priestly ministry ===
Lori was ordained to the priesthood by Cardinal William Baum on May 14, 1977, for the Archdiocese of Washington. After his ordination, Lori was assigned as a parochial vicar at St. Joseph Parish in Largo, Maryland, from 1977 until 1982. He earned a Doctor of Sacred Theology from the Catholic University of America in Washington, D.C., in 1982. That same year, Cardinal James Hickey named Lori as his theological advisor, a role Lori maintained until 2000.

Lori also served as the director of ecumenical affairs for the archdiocese from 1982 to 1986 and as Hickey's priest–secretary from 1983 until 1994. In 1994, Hickey appointed Lori as his chancellor, vicar general, and moderator of the curia. In early 1995, Lori was serving as archdiocesan spokesman when the archdiocese removed four priests from ministry. The priests had confessed to sexually abusing an altar boy years earlier.

=== Auxiliary Bishop of Washington ===
On February 25, 1995, Pope John Paul II appointed Lori as an auxiliary bishop of Washington and titular bishop of Bulla. He was consecrated by Hickey on April 20, 1995, at the Basilica of the National Shrine of the Immaculate Conception in Washington, D.C. Cardinal William Baum and Bishop William Curlin served as Lori's co-consecrators.

In 1997, Hickey ordered Lori to investigate irregularities in a Georgetown parish. The pastoral staff had allegedly used gender-neutral terms during mass and criticized the male-only priesthood. Lori interviewed dozens of parishioners under oath, leaving many of them unhappy with the experience.

=== Bishop of Bridgeport ===
On January 23, 2001, John Paul II appointed Lori as bishop of Bridgeport; he was installed on March 19, 2001. As bishop, Lori launched new initiatives in Catholic education, vocations, Catholic Charities, pastoral services, and other ministries

In 2002, Lori helped write the Charter for the Protection of Children and Young People by the USCCB. The first draft of the charter stated that its policies applied to bishops, priests, and deacons. However, the revised draft mentioned only priests and deacons. When questioned why the revised draft omitted bishops, Lori said that the drafting committee:

"...decided we would limit it to priests and deacons, as the disciplining of bishops is beyond the purview of this document. 'Cleric' would cover all three, so we decided not to use the word "cleric.'"

While serving in Bridgeport, Lori refused to release the names of diocesan priests being sued for sexual abuse. An activist group then sued the diocese to provide the names. The US Supreme Court ruled against the diocese in 2009, forcing it to reverse its policy.

=== Archbishop of Baltimore ===
On March 20, 2012, Lori was appointed archbishop of Baltimore by Pope Benedict XVI; Lori was installed on May 16, 2012. In addition to his role as archbishop, the Vatican in 2018 appointed Lori as apostolic administrator of the Diocese of Wheeling-Charleston. This action followed the retirement of Bishop Michael J. Bransfield. Lori investigated allegations that Bransfield had engaged in sexual harassment and made inappropriate financial transactions using diocesan funds.

In January 2019, Lori instituted an initiative for reporting allegations against the archbishop. The policy was drafted by the archdiocesan Independent Review Board.

In June 2019, the Washington Post obtained copies of the first and final drafts of Lori's report on Bransfield. The final draft omitted the names of several cardinals and bishops who had received cash gifts from Bransfield, including that of Lori himself. After the Post published the article, Lori returned his $7,500 gift from Bransfield to the Diocese of Wheeling-Charleston, asking that they donate it to Catholic Charities. Other bishops followed his example. Lori admitted removing the names to the Baltimore Sun, stating “looking back on this in hindsight, I would say that judgment call was a mistake.”

In May 2024, Lori announced that the archdiocese would reduce the number of parishes and worship sites in Baltimore and Baltimore County. The archdiocese would go from 61 parishes at 59 worship sites to 23 parishes at 30 worship sites in the affected areas. He remarked that the consolidations and closures would allow parishes to “focus on mission and ministry, as opposed to leaking roofs, crumbling walls, and failing electrical and plumbing systems.”

=== Memberships ===
==== USCCB positions ====
- Former chair and current member, Committee on Doctrine
- Former chair, Ad Hoc Committee for Religious Liberty
- Chair, Ad Hoc Committee on Universities and Colleges
- Member, Committee on Pro–Life Activities
- Member, Ad Hoc Committee for the Defense of Marriage
- Former member, Ad Hoc Committee on Sexual Abuse
- Former member, Committee on Catholic Education
- Vice president, USCCB (2022 to 2025)

==== Other memberships ====
- Chancellor and board chair, St. Mary's Seminary and University in Baltimore
- Chancellor, Mount St. Mary's Seminary
- Former board chair, Catholic University of America
- Former board chair, Sacred Heart University in Fairfield, Connecticut
- Supreme chaplain of the Knights of Columbus since 2005
- Grand Prior of the Middle Atlantic USA Lieutenancy of the Order of the Holy Sepulchre since 2011.

== Viewpoints ==
=== Abortion ===
In 2022, Lori expressed his support for a national ban on abortions after the 15th week of pregnancy. He explained that “Although we will never cease working for laws that protect human life from its beginning and supporting mothers in need, we think that this proposed legislation is a place to begin uniting Americans regardless of their views on abortion,” and “Further, we strongly agree that there is a federal role for protecting unborn human life.” In September 2024, he condemned Question 1, a ballot initiative before Maryland voters that would enshrine abortion rights for women in the Maryland State Constitution. This was in the wake of the overturning of the 1973 Roe vs. Wade decision by the US Supreme Court in 2022. He stated:

Question 1 seeks to enshrine abortion in the Maryland state constitution, an action that is both unnecessary and harmful ... It is harmful because it would divert resources away from efforts that promote the well-being of women, children, and families.

Question 1 passed overwhelmingly.

=== Capital punishment ===
In February 2013, Lori testified before the Maryland House of Delegates in support of a bill to repeal the death penalty.He stated,

While those who have done terrible harm to others deserve punishment, we urge a response that meets evil with a justice worthy of our best nature as human beings, enlightened by faith in the possibility of redemption and forgiveness.

=== Gun violence ===
After the killing of two children and the wounding of 17 others in August 2025 at Annunciation Catholic Church in Minneapolis, Minnesota, Lori offered his prayers to the survivors and the families. He called for an end to gun violence in the United States.

=== Immigration ===
Lori in January 2017 condemned the immigration orders of the Trump Administration that curtailed the admission of refugees from Muslim-majority nations and started the construction of a new Mexican border wall. He called them a "dark moment in American history."

In 2018, Lori announced that the archdiocese would offer ID cards to its parishioners that the Baltimore Police Department would recognize as valid forms of identification. The measure was designed to assist immigrants and other individuals in the archdiocese who faced obstacles in obtaining other forms of ID.

Lori expressed his disappointment in a 2020 court decision that allowed the Trump Administration to end Temporary Protected Status (TPS) for Salvadoran immigrants.

=== LGBTQ relations ===
In 2023, Lori issued Like Every Disciple, a set of guidelines for providing pastoral care to LGBTQ individuals in the archdiocese. Lori stated that:

“Persons who may identify as LGBT are daughters and sons of God, they are our brothers and sisters in Christ, they are members of the Body of Christ, they are our family members and friends.”

=== Poverty ===
Lori in December 2019 stated that bishops must focus on aiding the poor and not increasing their material wealth. He made these remarks several months after investigate Bishop Bransfield for allegations of financial mismanagement and embezzlement.

=== Racism ===
In January 2019, Lori released “The Journey to Racial Justice: Repentance, Healing and Action.” The document acknowledged racism in the Catholic Church and suggested measures to combat it.

== See also ==
- Catholic Church in the United States
- Hierarchy of the Catholic Church
- Historical list of the Catholic bishops of the United States
- List of Catholic bishops in the United States
- Lists of popes, patriarchs, primates, archbishops, and bishops

== Episcopal succession ==
Catholic Church titles
Preceded by Federico Bonifacio Madersbacher Gasteiger OFM	Titular Bishop of Bulla; February 28, 1995 – January 23, 2001	Succeeded by Percival Joseph Fernandez
Preceded by Edward Egan	Bishop of Bridgeport; January 23, 2001 – March 20, 2012	Succeeded by Frank Joseph Caggiano
Preceded by Thomas Vose Daily	Supreme Chaplain of the Knights of Columbus; 2005–present	Incumbent
Preceded by Edwin Frederick O'Brien	Archbishop of Baltimore; March 20, 2012–present	Incumbent
