= Giovanni (name) =

- Pronunciation: [dʒoˈvanni]
- Gender: Male
- Name day: 24 June

Other gender
- Feminine: Giovanna

Origin
- Origin: Hebrew, via Italian
- Meaning: "YHWH is Gracious"

Other names
- Related names: John, Gianni, Gjin, Evan, Hanna, Hans, Juan, Hovhannes, Ian, Ioan, Ioane, Ivan, Iven, Ifan, Jack, Jackson, Jan, Jane, Janez, Jean, Jhon, Joan, João, Johan/Johann, Johanan, Johannes, Jonne, Jovan, Juhani, Seán, Shane, Siôn, Yahya, Yohannes

Giovanni is a male Italian given name (from Greek Ioannes). It is the Italian equivalent of the English name John. Giovanni is frequently contracted to Gianni, Gian, or Gio, particularly in the name Gianbattista, and can also be found as a surname. It is sometimes spelt as Geovanni, Giovonnie, Giovannie or Jiovanni; its female counterpart is Giovanna.

== Given name ==
- Pope St. Paul VI (1897–1978), whose given name was Giovanni Battista Montini
- Pope Gelasius II (c. 1060–1119), whose given name was Giovanni Coniulo
- Pope Leo X (1475–1521), whose given name was Giovanni di Lorenzo de' Medici
- Giovanni Agnelli (1866–1945), Italian entrepreneur and founder of Fiat
- Giovanni Amelino-Camelia (born 1965), Italian physicist
- Giovanni Amendola (1882–1926), Italian journalist, professor, and politician
- Giovanni Arnolfini (c. 1400–c. 1450), merchant from Lucca
- Giovanni Báez (born 1981), Colombian road cyclist
- Giovanni Battaglin (born 1951), Italian road cyclist
- Giovanni Becatti (1912–1973), Italian archaeologist
- Giovanni Bellini (c. 1430–1516), Italian Renaissance painter
- Giovanni Battista Belzoni (1778–1823), Venetian explorer in Egypt
- Giovanni Benelli (1921–1982), Cardinal Archbishop of Florence, Italy
- Giovanni Boccaccio (1313–1375), Italian Renaissance writer
- Giovanni Boldini (1842–1931), Italian painter
- Giovanni Bononcini (1670–1747), Italian Baroque composer and cellist
- Giovanni Borgia (1475–1497), son of Pope Alexander VI
- Giovanni Bosco (1815–1888), Italian saint
- Giovanni Botero (c. 1544–1617), Italian writer, thinker, priest, poet, and diplomat
- Giovanni Bovio (1837–1903), Italian politician
- Giovanni Caravale (1935–1997), Italian academic and economist
- Giovani Casillas (born 1994), Mexican footballer
- Giovanni Cirfiera, Italian actor
- Giovanni Antonio Colonna (1878–1940), Italian noble and politician
- Giovanni Pietro Damian (born 2003), know professionally as Sangiovanni, Italian singer-songwriter
- Giovanni Dandolo (died 1289), 48th Doge of Venice
- Giovanni D'Aleo (born 1959), Italian long-distance runner
- Giovanni da Verrazzano (c. 1480–c. 1520), Italian explorer
- Giovanni de Macque (c. 1540–1614), late Renaissance Franco-Flemish composer
- Giovanni di Bernardone (c.1181–1226), better known as Saint Francis of Assisi
- Giovanni di Giovanni (c. 1350–1365), Italian youth executed for sodomy
- Giovanni Dioguardi (1914–1979), best known as Johnny Dio, American labor racketeer
- Giovani dos Santos (born 1989), Mexican football player
- Giovanni El-Hadi (born 2003), American football player
- Giovanni Evangelisti (born 1961), Italian long jumper
- Giovanni Falcone (1939–1992), Italian judge
- Giovanni Ferrari (1907–1982), Italian football player
- Giovanni Fornasini (1915–1944), Italian priest, recipient of Italy's Gold Medal of Military Valour, Servant of God
- Giovanni Frezza (born 1972), Italian actor
- Giovanni Girolamo Frezza (1506–1561), Italian engraver
- Giovanni Gabrieli (1557–1612), Italian early baroque composer
- Giovanni Galbaio (8th century–804), eighth Doge of Venice
- Giovanni Giacometti (1868–1933), Swiss painter
- Giovanni B. Giglioni (1929–2008), American business theorist
- Giovanni Gozzadini (1810–1887), Italian archaeologist
- Giovanni Bernardo Gremoli (1926–2017), Catholic bishop
- Giovanni Imparato (born 1982), know professionally as Colombre, Italian singer-songwriter
- Giovanni Infantino, known as Gianni Infantino (born 1970), Swiss football administrator with Italian citizenship
- Giovanni Jona-Lasinio (born 1932), Italian theoretical physicist
- Giovanni Lapentti (born 1983), Ecuadorian tennis player
- Giovanni Lavaggi (born 1958), Italian racing driver
- Giovani Lo Celso (born 1996), Argentine footballer
- Giovanni Leone, President of Italy from 1971 to 1978
- Giovanni "Gio" Lopez, American football player
- Giovanni Marradi (1852–1922), Italian poet
- Giovanni Marradi (musician) (born 1952), pianist, composer and arranger
- Giovanni Giorgio Moroder (born 1940), Italian record producer, songwriter, performer, and DJ
- Giovanni Nicotera (1828–1894), Italian politician
- Giovanni Paisiello (1740–1816), Italian composer
- Giovanni Palandrani (born 1996), American drag queen better known by the stage name Aquaria
- Giovanni Papini (1881–1956), Italian journalist, essayist, literary critic, poet, and novelist
- Giovanni I Participazio (died 837), tenth (historical) or twelfth (traditional) Doge of Venice
- Giovanni Passannante (1849–1910), Italian anarchist
- Giovanni Pernice (born 1990), Italian dancer
- Giovanni Pico della Mirandola (1463–1494), Italian philosopher
- Giovanni Pieraccini (1918–2017), Italian journalist and socialist
- Giovanni Pierpaoli (1833–1911), Italian painter
- Giovanni Pisano (1250–1315), Italian sculptor, painter and architect
- Giovanni Pittella (born 1958), Italian politician
- Giovanni Prandini (1940–2018), Italian politician
- Giovanni Prezioso (1957–2023), American lawyer
- Giovanni Ramponi (born 1956), Italian professor of electronics
- Giovanni Rana (born 1937), Italian entrepreneur
- Giovanni Battista Re (born 1934), Italian Roman Catholic Cardinal
- Gio Reyna (born 2002), American soccer player
- Giovanni Ribisi (born 1974), American actor
- Giovanni Ricci (American football) (born 1996), American football player
- Giovonnie Samuels (born 1985), Actress
- Giovanni Sanches (born 1991), Brazilian politician
- Giovanni Sbrissa (born 1996) Italian footballer
- Giovanni Scalise (1900–1929), later John Scalise, Italian-American organized crime figure
- Giovanni Schiaparelli (1835–1910), Italian astronomer
- Giovanni Antonio Scopoli (1723–1788), Italian physician and naturalist
- Giovanni Semerano (1913–2005), Italian philologist
- Giovanni Sgambati (1841–1914), Italian composer and pianist
- Giovanni Silva de Oliveira (born 1972), usually known as Giovanni, Brazilian soccer player
- Giovanni Simeone (born 1995), Argentine football player
- Giovanni Spadolini (1925–1994), liberal Italian politician, the 45th Prime Minister of Italy
- Giovanni Stampa (1913–?), Italian sailor
- Giovanni Targioni Tozzetti (1712–1783), Italian naturalist
- Giovanni Targioni-Tozzetti (1863–1934), Italian librettist
- Giovanni Trapattoni (born 1939), Italian football coach and player
- Giovanni van Bronckhorst (born 1975), Dutch football player
- Giovanni Vemba-Duarte (born 1991), Dutch–Angolan footballer
- Giovanni Vinci (born 1990), Italian professional wrestler
- Giovanni Visconti (archbishop) (1290–1354), Italian Roman Catholic cardinal
- Giovanni Zurolo (1382–1440), Italian feudal lord and count

== Surname ==
- Aria Giovanni (born 1977), model and adult film actress, Penthouse Pet for the month of September 2000
- Joy Giovanni (born 1978), actress and former WWE Diva
- Nikki Giovanni (1943–2024), American poet, activist and author

== Nickname ==
- Don Manley (born 1945), a compiler of crosswords known as Giovanni

== Fictional characters ==
- Giovanni Francis "Johnny Boy" Soprano, father of Tony Soprano from The Sopranos
- Giovanni (Pokémon), boss of Team Rocket in the fictional world of Pokémon
- Don Giovanni, protagonist of the eponymous Mozart opera

== See also ==
- Di Giovanni, DiGiovanni, De Giovanni
- Geovani
- Giovanni Battista
- Giovanelli
- Giovannelli
- Giovannetti
- Giovannini
