= Gianna =

- Pronunciation: English: /dʒiˈɑːnə, dʒiˈænə/ jee-A(H)N-ə; Italian: [ˈdʒanna]
- Language: Italian

Origin
- Meaning: "God is gracious"

Other names
- Variant forms: Giovanna; Giana
- Nickname: Gia

Gianna is a female Italian given name, a diminutive form of Giovanna. In English, it is translated as "Jane", "Jean", "Joan", "Joanne" or "Joanna".

== Variations ==
- Feminine: Giana, Gia, Giovanna
- Masculine: Gianni, Giovanni

== People ==
- Gianna Amore (born 1968), American model and actress
- Gianna Angelopoulos-Daskalaki (born 1955), Greek businesswoman
- Gianna Berger (born 1999), Swiss politician
- Gianna Bryant (2006–2020), American student-athlete, daughter of professional basketball player Kobe Bryant and Vanessa Bryant
- Gianna Camacho (born 1987), Peruvian journalist and activist for trans rights
- Gianna Maria Canale (1927–2009), Italian actress
- Gianna Clemente (born 2008), American golfer
- Gianna Creighton (born 2001), American soccer player
- Gianna D'Angelo (1929–2013), American soprano
- Gianna Dior (born 1997), American pornographic film actress
- Gianna Galli (1935–2010), Italian soprano
- Gianna Gancia (born 1972) Italian politician
- Gianna Gourley (born 2001), American soccer player
- Gianna Hablützel-Bürki (born 1969), Swiss fencer
- Gianna Jannoni (born 1924), Italian high jumper
- Gianna Jessen (born 1977), American singer and anti-abortion activist
- Gianna Jun (Jun Ji-hyun, born 1981), South Korean actress and model
- Gianna Kneepkens (born 2003), American college basketball player
- Gianna Manzini (1896–1974), Italian writer
- Gianna Beretta Molla (1922–1962), Italian pediatrician and Roman Catholic saint
- Gianna Nannini (born 1954), Italian singer-songwriter
- Gianna Paul (born 2004), American soccer player
- Gianna Pederzini (1900–1988), Italian mezzo-soprano
- Gianna Persaki (1921-2008), Greek artist
- Gianna Rackow (born 2000), German footballer
- Gianna Rolandi (1952–2021), American soprano
- Gianna Simone (born 1989), American actress, model, and producer
- Gianna Talone (born 1957), Italian-American pharmacist and writer
- Gianna Terribili-Gonzales (1882–1940), Italian actress
- Giuseppina "Gianna" Tuissi (1923–1945), Italian resistance member
- Gianna Woodruff (born 1993), Panamanian hurdler
