= Persaki =

Persaki is a Greek surname. Notable people with the surname include:

- Eva Persaki (fl. 1975), Greek painter
- Gianna Persaki (1921–2008), Greek painter

== See also ==
- Persakis
