= Giovannoni =

Giovannoni is a surname. Notable people with the surname include:

- Achille Giovannoni (1925–2014), French rower
- Guilherme Giovannoni (born 1980), Brazilian-Italian basketball player
- Jeanne M. Giovannoni professor
- Stephen J. Giovannoni, American microbiologist

== See also ==
- Giovannini
