= Gia (disambiguation) =

Gia is a 1998 film about Gia Marie Carangi.

GIA or Gia may also refer to:

== People ==
- Gia (name), a given name (including a list of people with the name)

== Places ==
- Gia, Leh, a village in India
- Gan International Airport, Maldives
- Glasgow International Airport, Scotland, UK

== Groups, companies, organizations ==
- GIA Publications, an American music publisher
- Gemological Institute of America
- Georgetown International Academy, in Guyana
- Georgia Interscholastic Association, formed 1948, merged to Georgia High School Association in 1970

=== Airlines ===
- Garuda Indonesian Airways, former name of Garuda Indonesia, the national airline of Indonesia
- Ghana International Airlines
- Gambia International Airlines

=== Government and political organizations ===
- Armed Islamic Group of Algeria, (French: Groupe Islamique Armé)
- Gallup International Association, a polling organization
- General Intelligence Agency of Mongolia
- Gia people, an Aboriginal Australian people of the state of Queensland.
- Government Information Awareness, an American open government project

== Entertainment ==
- Gia (album), a 2001 album by Greek singer Despina Vandi
- "Gia" (song), a 2001 single by Despina Vandi, taken from the album

== Other uses ==
- Gia (protein), a protein in Drosophila
- Glacial isostatic adjustment
- Gross internal area

== See also ==
- Kea (island), in the Cyclades, Greece
- Kia (Korean: 기아, romanized: Gia), a Korean automobile company
