= Johann Jakob Frey the Elder =

Swiss artist and engraver (1681–1752)

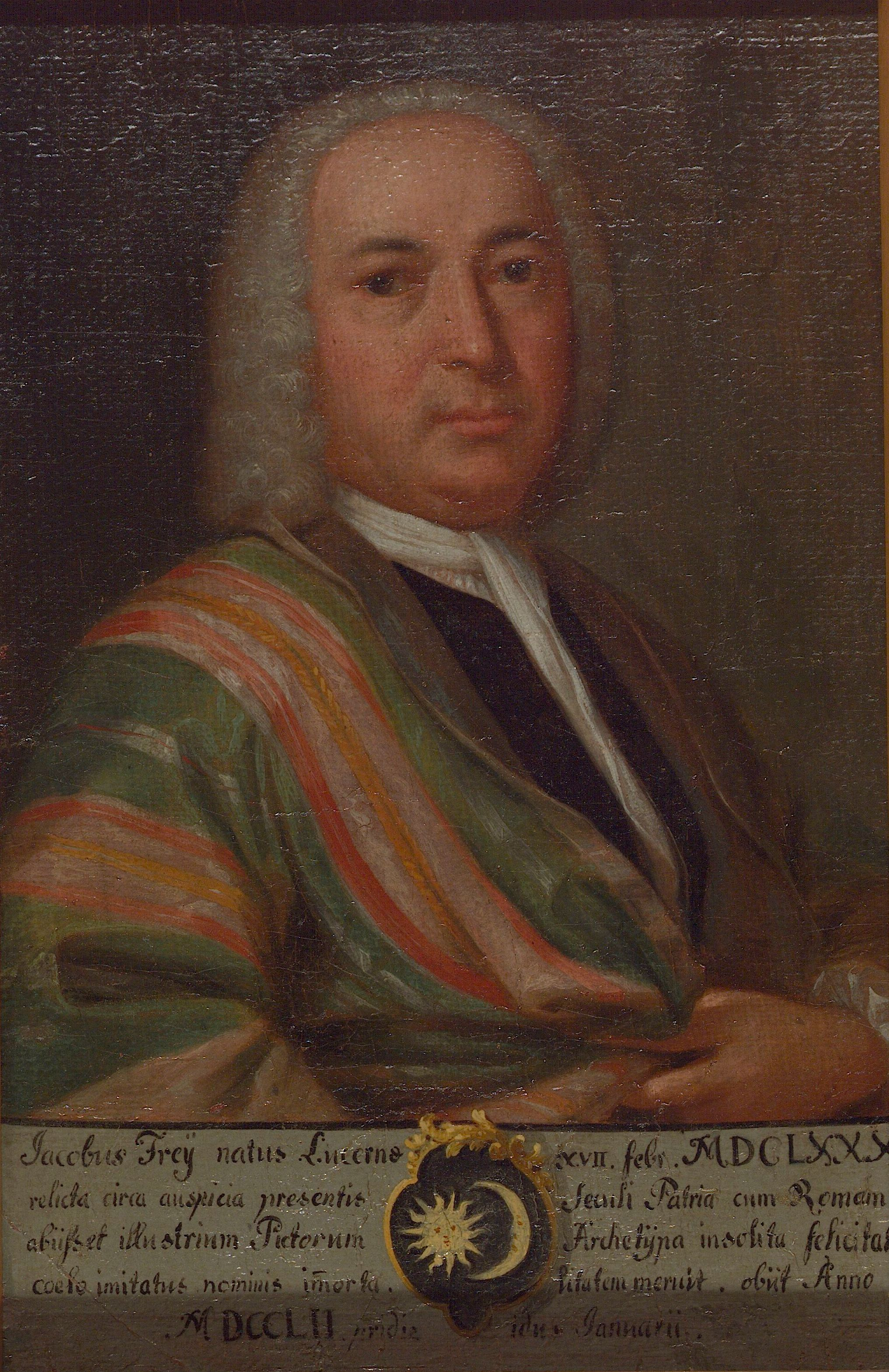
Portrait of Jakob Frey

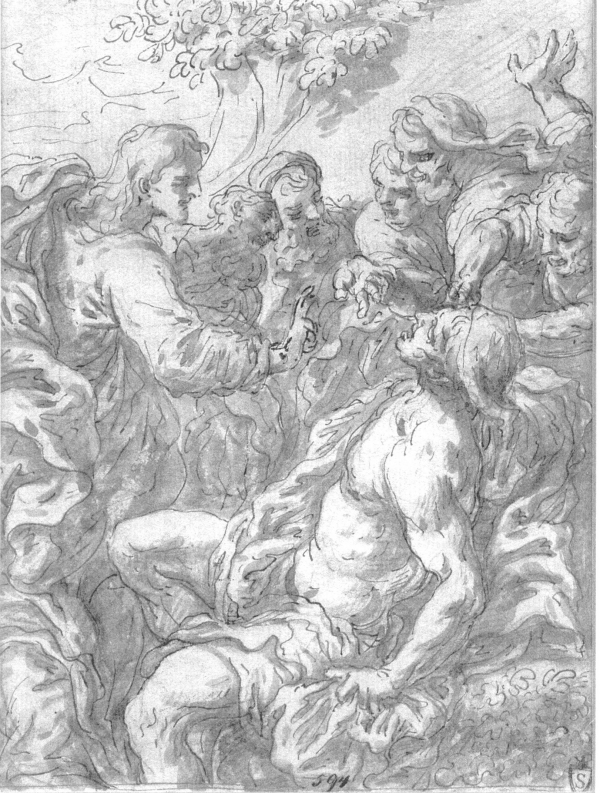
Jesus healing the sick, drawing now considered to be lost

Johann Jakob Frey the Elder (17 February 1681 – 11 January 1752) was a Swiss engraver.

Frey was born in Lucerne. After learning the principles of design he went, when he was twenty-two years of age, to Rome, where he received some instruction from Arnold van Westerhout, and had afterwards the advantage of studying in the school of Carlo Maratti, at the same time with Robert van Auden-Aerd. His progress was rapid, and he was soon regarded as one of the ablest artists in Rome. His drawing is correct and tasteful, and he was a perfect master of harmony and effect. He etched his plates with spirit, and worked over the etching with a firm and masterly hand. Pew artists have approached nearer to the style of the painters from whom they engraved than Frey. He died at Rome, aged 70.

His prints, which exceed the number of one hundred, are generally of a very large size. The following are the principal:

== Portraits ==
- Carlo Maratti; after a picture by himself.
- Pope Innocent XIII; after A. Masucci.
- Pope Benedict XIII; after the same.
- Pope Gregory XIII; after the marble by Camillo Rusconi.
- Girolamo Pico della Mirandola; after P. Nelly.
- Mary Clementina Sobieska, wife of the Old Pretender.

== Subjects after various masters ==
- The Holy Family; copied from Edelinck's print after Raphael.
- Charity, with three children; after Albani.
- The Death of St. Petronilla; after Guercino. 1731.
- The Coronation of the Virgin; after Annibale Carraci.
- The Virgin giving the Scapular to St. Simon Stock; after Seb. Conca.
- The Adoration of the Shepherds; after the same.
- St. Francis of Paola restoring a Child to life; after B. Lambertini.
- The Archangel Michael; after Guido.
- The Four Fathers of the Church; after the same.
- Aurora, with the Hours dancing before the Chariot of the Sun; after the same; in two sheets.
- Bacchus consoling Ariadne after the Departure of Theseus; after the same; in two sheets.
- The Death of St. Anne; after A. Sacchi.
- St. Romualdus; after the same.
- The Martyrdom of St. Sebastian; after Domenichino. 1737.
- Esther fainting before King Ahasuerus; after Domenichino
- The Communion of St. Jerome; after the same. 1729.
- The Four Angels of St. Carlo a Catenari at Rome, representing Justice, Temperance, Fortitude, and Prudence; after the same.
- The Rape of Europa; after Albani.
- St. Charles Borromeo interceding for the Plague-stricken; after Pietro da Cortona. 1744.
- An allegorical picture of Clemency; after Carlo Maratti.
- A Reposo, with St. Joseph presenting cherries to the Infant Christ; after the same.
- Augustus shutting the Temple of Janus; after the same. 1738.
- St. Andrew kneeling before the Cross; after the same.
- St. Bernard; after the same.
