= Edwin Frederick O'Brien =

American Catholic prelate (born 1939)

His Eminence Edwin Frederick O'Brien
- Cardinal priest of San Sebastiano al Palatino; Grand Master emeritus of the Order of the Holy Sepulchre
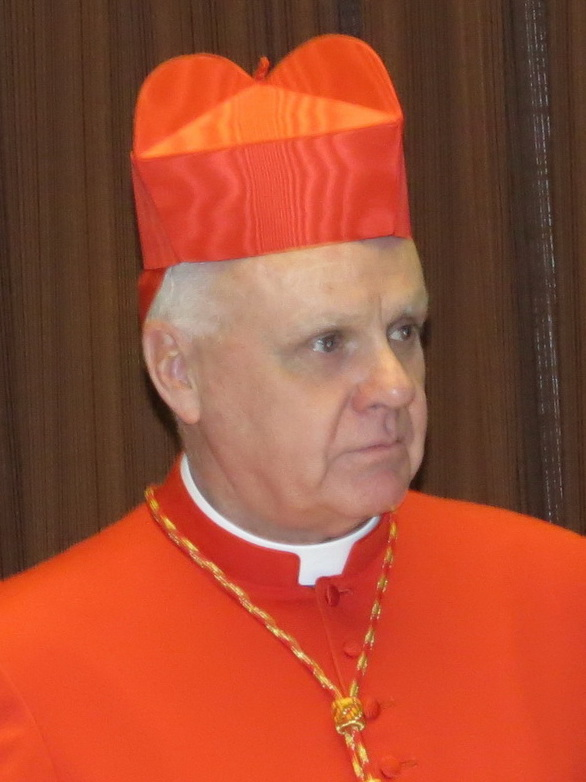
- Cardinal O'Brien in 2012
- Church: Catholic Church; Latin Church
- Appointed: March 15, 2012
- Retired: December 8, 2019
- Predecessor: John Patrick Foley
- Successor: Fernando Filoni
- Previous posts: Archbishop of Baltimore (2007‍–‍2011); Archbishop for the Military Services, USA (1997‍–‍2007); Auxiliary Bishop of New York (1996‍–‍1997); Titular Bishop of Thizica (1996‍–‍1997); Rector, St. Joseph's Seminary (1994‍–‍1997); Rector, Pontifical North American College (1990‍–‍1994); Prelate of Honour of His Holiness (1986‍–‍1996); Rector, St. Joseph's Seminary (1985‍–‍1989)

Orders
- Ordination: May 29, 1965 by Francis Spellman
- Consecration: March 25, 1996 by John Joseph O'Connor
- Created cardinal: February 18, 2012 by Benedict XVI
- Rank: Cardinal deacon (2012‍–‍2022); Cardinal priest (2022‍–‍present)

Personal details
- Born: April 8, 1939 (age 87) Bronx, New York, U.S.
- Motto: Pastores dabo vobis (Latin for 'I will give you shepherds') Jeremiah 3:15

Ordination history of Edwin Frederick O'Brien
History
Priestly ordination
- Ordained by: Francis Joseph Spellman
- Date: May 29, 1965
- Place: St. Patrick's Cathedral, Archdiocese of New York
Episcopal consecration
- Principal consecrator: John Joseph O'Connor
- Co-consecrators: Patrick Joseph Thomas Sheridan, John Gavin Nolan
- Date: March 25, 1996
- Place: St. Patrick's Cathedral, Archdiocese of New York
Cardinalate
- Elevated by: Benedict XVI
- Date: February 18, 2012
Episcopal succession
Bishops consecrated by Edwin Frederick O'Brien as principal consecrator
- John Joseph Kaising: 2000
- Richard Brendan Higgins: 2004
- Joseph Walter Estabrook: 2004

Styles of Edwin Frederick O'Brien
- Reference style: His Eminence
- Spoken style: Your Eminence
- Religious style: Cardinal
- Informal style: Cardinal
- See: Baltimore (Emeritus)

Edwin Frederick O'Brien (born April 8, 1939) is an American Catholic prelate who headed the Order of the Holy Sepulchre from 2011 to 2019. He previously served as archbishop of Baltimore in Maryland from 2007 to 2011 and as Archbishop of the Military Services, USA, in Washington, D.C. from 1997 to 2007. He was an auxiliary bishop for the Archdiocese of New York from 1996 to 1997. O'Brien was made a cardinal in 2012.

== Early life and education ==
Edwin O'Brien was born on April 8, 1939, in the Bronx, New York, to Edwin Frederick Sr. and Mary Winifred O'Brien. One of three children, he had two brothers, Ken and Tom O'Brien, now deceased. O'Brien graduated from Our Lady of Solace Parish School in the Bronx in 1953 and attended St. Mary's High School in Katonah, New York from 1953 to 1957.

O'Brien entered St. Joseph's Seminary in Yonkers, New York in 1959, where he obtained his Bachelor of Arts (1961), Master of Divinity (1964), and Master of Arts (1965) degrees.

== Priesthood ==
O'Brien was ordained to the priesthood at St. Patrick's Cathedral in Manhattan for the Archdiocese of New York by Cardinal Francis Spellman on May 29, 1965.

O'Brien served as a civilian chaplain at the United States Military Academy at West Point until 1970, when he enlisted in the U.S. Army Chaplain Corps with the rank of captain. He took Army flight training with parachute jumping. In 1970, O'Brien began serving as a chaplain at Fort Bragg in North Carolina with the US Army 82nd Airborne Division.

O'Brien was sent to South Vietnam in 1971 during the Vietnam War with the US Army 173rd Airborne Brigade and the 3rd Brigade, 1st Cavalry Division. While in South Vietnam, O'Brien was based in the countryside and flew with a Protestant minister by helicopter to minister to soldiers. In 1972, O'Brien was transferred to Georgia, serving as post chaplain at Fort Gordon until his discharge from the service in 1973.

In 1973, Cardinal Terence Cooke sent O'Brien to study in Rome at the Pontifical North American College in Rome. He graduated from the Pontifical University of St. Thomas Aquinas Angelicum in Rome with a Doctorate in Sacred Theology in 1976. His dissertation was titled The Origin and Development of Moral Principles in the Theology of Paul Ramsey.

Returning to New York, O'Brien served as both the vice-chancellor of the Archdiocese of New York and associate pastor at St. Patrick Cathedral Parish in Manhattan from 1976 to 1981. He coordinated Pope John Paul II's visit to New York in 1979 and was the archdiocesan director of communications from 1981 to 1983. Between 1983 and 1985, O'Brien served as Cooke's priest-secretary, then for his successor, Cardinal John O'Connor.

O'Brien was elevated by the Vatican to honorary prelate of his holiness in 1986. He served as rector of St. Joseph's Seminary from 1985 to 1989, and of the Pontifical North American College from 1990 to 1994. Returning to New York, O'Brien served another term as rector of St. Joseph's from 1994 to 1997.

=== Auxiliary Bishop of New York ===
On February 6, 1996, John Paul II appointed O'Brien as auxiliary bishop of New York and titular bishop of ThizicaI. He received his episcopal consecration on March 25, 1996, by Cardinal O'Connor, with bishops Patrick Sheridan and John Nolan serving as co-consecrators, at St. Patrick's Cathedral. O'Brien selected as his episcopal motto: Pastores Dabo Vobis, meaning, "I will give you shepherds" Jeremiah 3:15.

During this time, O’Brien continued to serve as rector of St. Joseph's Seminary. While serving there, he ordained (with Vatican permission) Reverend Eugene Hamilton, a 24-year old seminarian who was suffering from terminal cancer. O'Connor had petitioned the Vatican for Hamilton's early ordination, which O'Brien officiated a few hours before Hamilton died.

=== Archbishop for the Military Services, USA ===
Coat of Arms as Archbishop of the Military Services

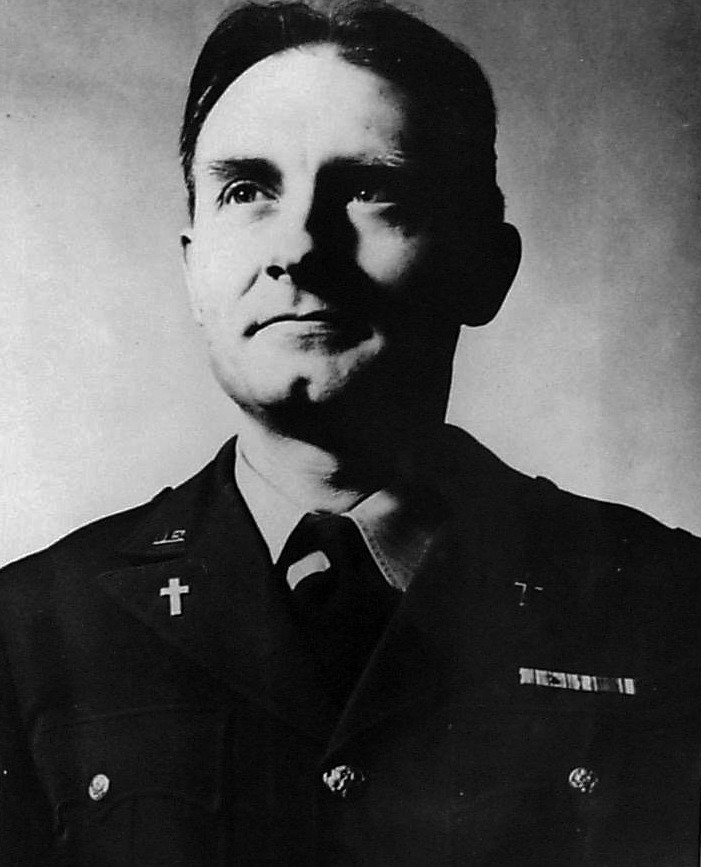
Reverend Kapaun (1950)

On April 7, 1997, John Paul II appointed O'Brien as coadjutor archbishop for the Archdiocese of the Military Services, USA. He succeeded Archbishop Joseph Dimino when he retired on August 12, 1997.

During his ten years as archbishop, O'Brien divided his time between visiting American troops and working with the Pontifical North American College. In 1993, he initiated the cause of canonization for Reverend Emil Kapaun, a US Army chaplain killed while in North Korean captivity during the Korean War.

From September 2005 to June 2006, O'Brien also served as the Vatican's coordinator for the papal visitation of seminaries and houses of priestly formation. His report also called for a stronger focus on moral theology, increased oversight of seminarians, and greater involvement of diocesan bishops in the formation process. He was recognized as being "instrumental in Catholic seminary reform in the wake of clergy sex abuse disclosures."

In 2006, O'Brien noted that declining public support for the Iraq War was leading to a decrease in morale among the troops, adding, "The news only shows cars being blown up, but the soldiers see hospitals being built and schools opening." By 2007, he believed that the status of US operations in Iraq "compels an assessment of our current circumstances and the continuing obligation of the Church to provide a moral framework for public discussion." O'Brien refused to "question the moral integrity of our military personnel," but added,

"[O]ur nation must honestly assess what is achievable in Iraq using the traditional just war principles of 'probability of success' ... Our troops should remain in Iraq only as long as their presence contributes to a responsible transition."

O'Brien opposed the National Defense Authorization Act of 2007. He said that it

"would seek to impose a legislative mandate for military chaplains without considering the religious needs of all military members ... [and] may well result in less public prayer and marginalization of military chaplains."

He was appointed a member of the Congregation for Catholic Education in the Roman Curia in May 2007.

=== Archbishop of Baltimore ===
Coat of Arms as Archbishop of Baltimore

On July 12, 2007, Pope Benedict XVI appointed O'Brien as the 15th archbishop of Baltimore. Recalling the call he received from the apostolic nunciature, O'Brien immediately accepted the appointment and later remarked, "I guess that's one thing I take from the military. When you're given an order, you accept." He succeeded Cardinal William Keeler. O'Brien was installed at the Cathedral of Mary Our Queen in Baltimore on October 1, 2007.

As head of the nation's oldest archdioceses, O'Brien held the status of primus inter pares in the American hierarchy. Commenting on O'Brien's appointment, The Baltimore Sun said,

"He has leapt from military airplanes, served in jungles during the Vietnam War and travelled extensively to current battle zones in Afghanistan and Iraq. From his working-class roots ... to the upper echelons of Catholic power—carrying a Christian message of peace and love to some of the world's worst war-torn terrain".

Following his tour of the archdiocese, O'Brien lamented the amount of poverty and violence in Baltimore, saying,

"I think anybody who wants to take a walk can find areas with very nice homes, well-kept lawns, good streets and sidewalks, and maybe 15 minutes later find themselves in a neighborhood that is just racked, torn apart, as if a war had just been fought."

On June 29, 2008, Benedict XVI invested O'Brien with the pallium, a vestment worn by metropolitan bishops, at St. Peter's Basilica in Rome. In October 2008, O'Brien dedicated the Pope John Paul II Prayer Garden in Baltimore, which he called a "sanctuary in a suffering city." O'Brien's three years and 11 months as archbishop was one of the briefest terms in Baltimore's history. While archbishop, he was Grand Prior of the Middle Atlantic USA Lieutenancy of the Order of the Holy Sepulchre from 2007 to 2011.

In October 2008, O'Brien released a letter to the archdiocese regarding alleged visions of the Virgin Mary by Gianna Talone Sullivan. A clinical psychologist, Sullivan had been claiming these messages since 1989. In 2004, she started holding meetings of her followers at a farm in Taneytown, Maryland, within the archdiocese. The Congregation for the Doctrine of the Faith at the Vatican had examined the situation and concluded that there were no supernatural communications. In his letter, O'Brien cautioned all Catholics involved with Sullivan that they were doing a disservice to the Catholic church by disseminating claims about her visions.

=== Grand Master of the Equestrian Order of the Holy Sepulchre of Jerusalem ===
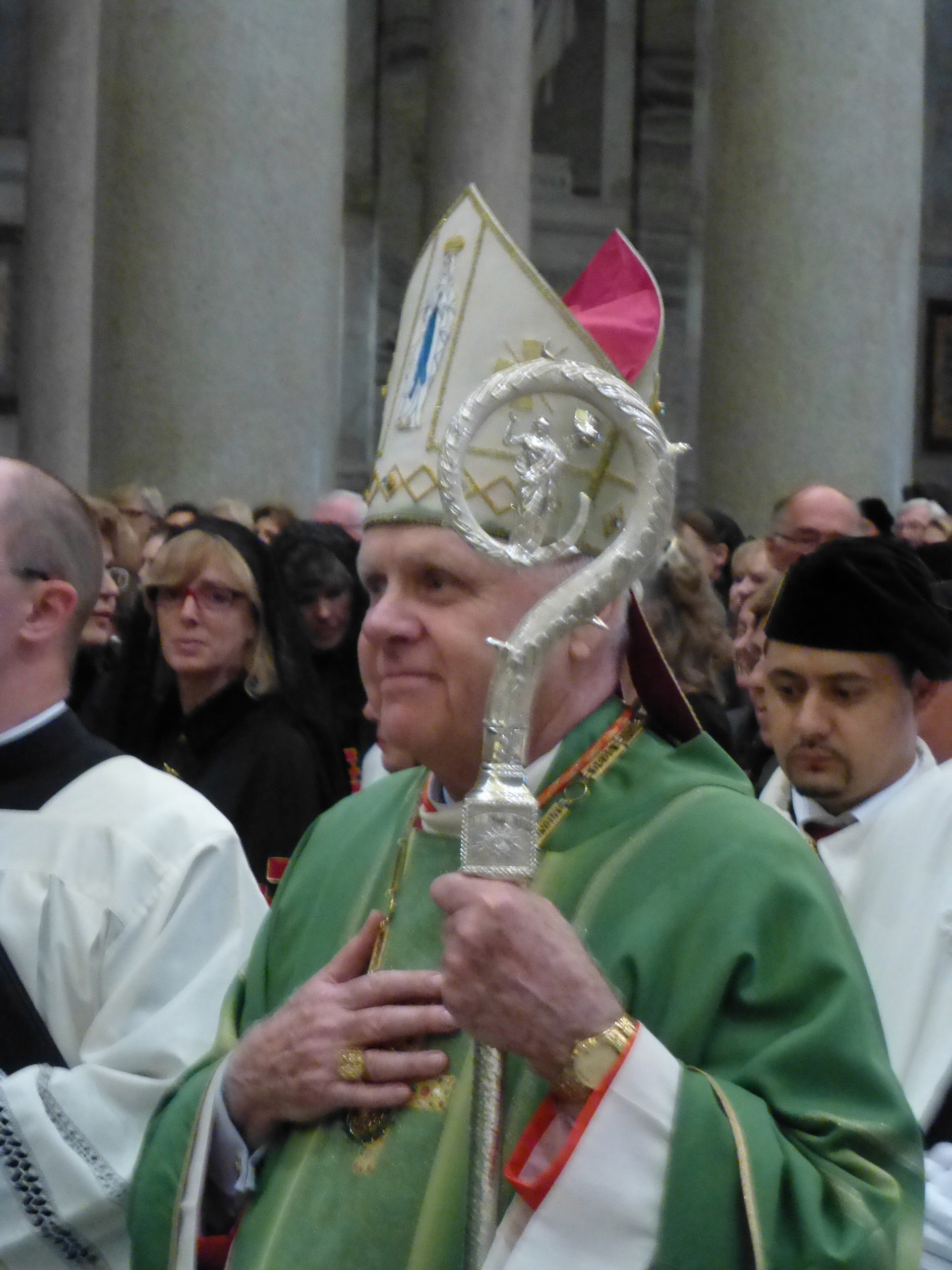
Cardinal Grand Master O'Brien, OESSH Pilgrimage, Rome, Italy (2013)

On August 17, 2011, after Cardinal John Foley reached the mandatory retirement age, Cardinal Tarcisio Bertone asked O'Brien during a visit to Rome if he would assume the position of pro-grand master. O'Brien accepted the position the next day and was appointed by Benedict XVI on August 29, 2011.

Benedict XVI elevated O'Brien to cardinal on February 18, 2012. O'Brien was created cardinal-deacon of San Sebastiano al Palatino, the same titular church previously held by Foley. O'Brien was named grand master of the Equestrian Order of the Holy Sepulchre of Jerusalem on March 15, 2012.

On April 21, 2012, O'Brien was appointed a member of the Congregation for the Oriental Churches and the Pontifical Council Cor Unum. He participated in the 2013 papal conclave that elected Pope Francis.

Francis accepted O'Brien's resignation as grand master on December 8, 2019. On March 4, 2022, he was elevated to the rank of cardinal-priest.

== Views ==
=== Abortion ===
O'Brien opposes abortion, calling it the "greatest civil issue of our time" and saying,

"[The right to life] will determine whether America remains a hospitable society: committed to caring for women in crisis and their unborn children; committed to caring for those with special needs; committed to caring for the elderly and the dying; or whether America betrays our heritage and the truths on which its founders staked its claim to independence."

During the 2008 US presidential election, O'Brien lamented that the "clear and unchanged teaching of our Church from its earliest days has been so distorted in political debate and commentary." This was an indirect criticism of remarks made by US House Speaker Nancy Pelosi and Senator Joe Biden concerning the Catholic Church's position on abortion.

In March 2009, O'Brien said he was both "disappointed and bewildered" by the decision of the University of Notre Dame to invited US President Barack Obama deliver the commencement speech and receive an honorary degree at the university's graduation ceremony. This was because of Obama's support for abortion rights for women and embryonic stem cell research (which the Catholic Church opposed).

=== Capital punishment ===
In 2008, O'Brien expressed his opposition to capital punishment, citing John Paul II's encyclical Evangelium Vitae, although he had previously "thought it served a purpose."

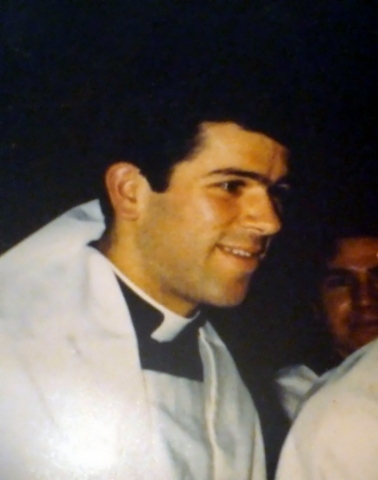
Reverend Alvaro Corcuera (1985)

=== Legion of Christ ===
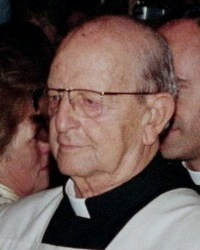
Reverend Maciel (2004)

As archbishop of Baltimore, O'Brien was an outspoken critic of the Legion of Christ, a religious order founded in Mexico. He condemned the Legion in 2008 for its alleged practice of "blind allegiance" to its leaders and its "heavily persuasive methods on young people, especially high schoolers, regarding vocations." He called for greater "transparency and accountability" from the Legion and its lay arm, Regnum Christi, including both consecrated and non-consecrated members.

O'Brien wanted to expel the Legion from the archdiocese, but was dissuaded by the Vatican. Instead, he wrote in June 2008 to Superior General Álvaro Corcuera Martínez del Río of the Legion, asking for controls on their operations in the archdiocese. As a result, Martínez del Río directed the Legion and Regnum Christi chapters in the archdiocese to disclose all their activities to O'Brien. He also directed them to stop providing spiritual direction to anyone under age 18.

In February 2009, the Legion of Christ superiors acknowledged that their founder, Reverend Marcial Maciel, had engaged in "inappropriate" behavior. This included including drug and sexual abuse as well as the fathering a child. O'Brien said that the Legion must offer "full disclosure of [Maciel's] activities and those who are complicit in them, or knew of them, and of those who are still refusing to offer disclosure," adding that the institute's finances should also be subject to "objective scrutiny."

O'Brien called Maciel "a man with an entrepreneurial genius who, by systematic deception and duplicity, used our faith to manipulate others for his own selfish ends." O'Brien welcomed the Vatican's decision in March 2009 to conduct an apostolic visitation of the Legion and said that its abolition "should be on the table." (Note: In 2010 the Vatican agreed to a request by the consecrated lay branch for their own Apostolic Visitator: "The Holy Father will send a visitator to the consecrated members of the "Regnum Christi" Movement, who have insistently requested this." At their own request, all the lay consecrated have become more autonomous. In 2013 they elected a general director and a five-woman council, each with a term of six years. They have developed an eight-year discernment process for consecrated women.)In 2009, O'Brien criticized the lack of "respect for human dignity for each of its members" from the Legion

The Legion subsequently experienced decreasing enrollment in the archdiocese, leading to the closure in 2011 of its Woodmont Academy in Cooksville, Maryland.

=== LGBTQ ===
In 2005, O'Brien expressed his personal opposition to admitting gay men to seminaries, a position he said was "based on 12 years' experience as rector of two U.S. seminaries".

O'Brien led a successful campaign in 2011 to defeat a bill in the Maryland General Assembly to legalize same-sex marriage.

=== Just War ===
O'Brien has been an outspoken proponent of the just war theory. Sometimes called the "Warrior Cardinal", he is seen as a controversial figure and is considered to have given moral justifications for the 2003 US invasion in Iraq. Early in 2003, O'Brien spoke to Catholic members of the corps of cadets at the United States Military Academy at West Point during a mass:

"I know that a lot of people have said that the Pope is against war with Iraq ... But even if he did, you are not bound by conscience to obey his opinion. However, you are bound in conscience to obey the orders of your Commander-in-Chief, and if he orders you to go to war, it is your duty to go to war".

In March 2003, a few days after the Iraq invasion, in a letter to American Catholic military chaplains, O'Brien wrote:

"Given the complexity of factors involved, many of which understandably remain confidential, it is altogether appropriate for members of our armed forces to presume the integrity of our [military] leadership and its judgments, and therefore to carry out their military duties in good conscience ... It is to be hoped that all factors which have led to our intervention will eventually be made public, and ... will shed helpful light upon our President's decision".

O'Brien did not endorse the Iraq war or the motivations behind it. Supporters of the war in Iraqi cited his positions. He was criticized in 2003 and 2004 by opponents of the war for distancing himself from the pope's position and that of the U.S. Conference of Catholic Bishops.

According to the journalist Sabrina Ferrisi in a 2009 article, O'Brien's spiritual direction proved effective in calming the doubts of soldiers, advising them that they can safely leave the responsibility for moral decision-making to the US Government. O'Brien believes that chaplains play an essential role in helping soldiers perform their fighting duties with a clear conscience, and in easing relationships with local populations and to avoid such gross misconduct as the torture of prisoners at the Abu Ghraib prison in Iraq.

In July 2009, at the U.S. Strategic Command Deterrence Symposium, O'Brien provided his view on just war theories, saying "The moral end we seek ought to shape the means we use", that the U.S. must "move beyond nuclear deterrence as rapidly as possible". He urged world leaders to "stay focused on the destination of a nuclear-weapons-free world and on the concrete steps that lead there."

O'Brien in 2010 complained that too few Catholics priests were serving in active duty, being replaced by chaplains of other faiths because the military disregarded the significance of denominational affiliation.

In September 2013, when Obama was considering the use of military force against the Bashar al-Assad regime in Syria, O'Brien said that "whatever we do will contribute to peace in that part of the world". This position contradicted the views of the hierarchy of the Catholic Church in Syria.

=== Immigration ===
O'Brien in 2011 expressed his support of the Maryland DREAM Act, which provided free college tuition to certain undocumented immigrants. During a meeting on immigration that was sponsored by the Archdiocese of Chicago in 2012, O'Brien made these remarks;

We acknowledge that our nation must protect and keep its borders. But we also suggest a more fundamental principle that when the basic needs of a person do not find an answer in their own country, these persons have the right to seek a solution outside, in order to support themselves and their families.

=== Middle East ===
In 2018, O'Brien criticized a bill passed by the Israeli Knesset that removed Arabic as an official language in Israel and allowed majority-Jewish communities to discriminate against Israeli Arabs in housing.

== See also ==
- Catholic Church in the United States
- Chaplain Corps (United States Army)
- Hierarchy of the Catholic Church
- List of Catholic bishops of the United States: military service
- Military chaplain
- Religious symbolism in the United States military
- United States military chaplains

== Notes ==
Academic offices
Preceded by Lawrence M. Purcell	Rector of the Pontifical North American College; 1990–1994	Succeeded by Timothy M. Dolan
Catholic Church titles
Preceded by John Patrick Foley	Grand Master of the Equestrian Order of the Holy Sepulchre of Jerusalem; 2011 - 2019	Succeeded by Fernando Filoni
Preceded by William Henry Keeler	Archbishop of Baltimore; 2007–2011	Succeeded by William E. Lori
Preceded by Joseph Thomas Dimino	Archbishop for the Military Services; 1997 – 2007	Succeeded by Timothy Broglio
Preceded by -	Auxiliary Bishop of New York; 1996 – 1997	Succeeded by -
Preceded by Alfonso Nava Carreón; Bishop of Tizica	Titular Archbishop of Thizica; 1996 – 1998	Succeeded by Louis Dicaire; Bishop of Thizica
