= Geovanna =

Geovanna is a feminine given name.

People known by this name include:

- Geovanna Bañuelos de la Torre (born 1980), Mexican politician
- Geovanna Santos (born 2002), Brazilian rhythmic gymnast
- Geovanna Tominaga (born 1980), Brazilian actress and television host

== See also ==
- Giovanna
