= Gio (nickname) =

Gio or Giò is a nickname, most commonly a shortened form of Giovanni, Giorgio, Giorgi, Giuseppe, or Sergio. It may refer to:

== People with the nickname ==
- Gio (singer) (born 1990), Spanish singer and actor
- Gio Alvarez (born 1976), Filipino actor
- Gio Aplon (born 1982), South African rugby union footballer
- Giorgio Armani, cf. "Acqua di Giò", a perfume of his
- Gio Benitez (born 1985), American journalist
- Giorgi Kinkladze (born 1970), Georgian footballer
- Gio Dee (born 1992), American hip hop artist
- Giò Di Tonno (born 1973), Italian singer
- Gio González (born 1985), American baseball player
- Gio Petré (born 1937), Swedish actress
- Giò Pomodoro (1930–2002), Italian artist
- Giò Ponti (1891–1979), Italian architect, industrial designer, furniture designer, artist, and publisher.
- Giovana Queiroz (born 2003), Brazilian footballer
- Giò Sada (born 1989), Italian singer
- Gio Scotti (born 2006), Italian model and influencer
- Gio Washington (born 1973), American musician
- Gio Wiederhold (born 1936), Italian-American computer scientist
- Giovanni van Bronckhorst (born 1975), Dutch footballer
- Mark Giordano (born 1983), Canadian ice hockey player

== Fictional characters with the nickname ==
- Gio Gio, in the Japanese manga JoJo's Bizarre Adventure

== See also ==
- Gio (disambiguation)
