= Granieri (surname) =

Granieri is an Italian surname. Notable people with the surname include:

- Giovanna Granieri (born 1974), Italian basketball player
- Nicola Granieri (1942–2006), Italian fencer

== See also ==
- Ranieri
