= Giovannetti =

Giovannetti is an Italian surname, derived from the given name Giovanni. Notable people with the surname include:

- Alberto Giovannetti (1913–1989), Vatican diplomat
- Andrea Gioannetti (1722–1800), Roman Catholic bishop and cardinal
- Julien Giovannetti (1914–1966), French operatic baritone
- Lilia Giovannetti (1929–2019), Italian actress
- Luciano Giovannetti (born 1945), Italian sport shooter
- Luciano Giovannetti (born 1934), Italian Catholic bishop
- Luigi Pericle Giovannetti or Luigi Pericle (1916–2001), Swiss painter, cartoonist and illustrator
- Marco Giovannetti (born 1962), Italian cyclist
- Matteo Giovannetti or Giovanetti (c.1322–1368), Italian painter
- Raffaelle Giovannetti (1822–1911), Italian painter
