= Giovannelli =

Giovannelli is an Italian surname, derived from the given name Giovanni. Notable people with the surname include:

- Benedetto Giovannelli (1602–1676), architect
- Leonida Nikolai Giovannelli (1906–198?), Italian/Manx writer and cultural activist
- Miriam Giovanelli (born 1989), Italian/Spanish actress and model
- Paolo Giovannelli (born 1960), Italian football player
- Riccardo Giovanelli (1946–2022), Italian astronomer
- Ruggiero Giovannelli (c.1560–1625), Italian composer
