= Van Westerhout =

Dutch surname

van Westerhout or Van Westerhout is a Dutch surname.

People with this name include:

- Balthasar van Westerhout (1656–1728), Flemish printmaker and painter
- Arnold van Westerhout (1651–1725), Flemish printmaker, painter, draughtsman and engraver
- Niccolò van Westerhout (1857–1898), Italian composer
