= Cardinal O'Brien =

Cardinal O'Brien may refer to:

- Edwin Frederick O'Brien (born 1939), American cardinal, Grand Master of the Order of the Holy Sepulchre and Archbishop of Baltimore
- Keith O'Brien (1938–2018), Scottish cardinal and Archbishop of St Andrews and Edinburgh
