= François Collignon =

French engraver, print-seller and publisher

- Young Man with Fortuna, Time, and Envy, engraved by François Collignon after Pietro Testa, Rijksmuseum, Amsterdam
- Born: 1609; Nancy, Kingdom of France
- Died: 18 January 1687 (aged 77–78); Rome, Papal States
- Known for: Engraver
- Movement: Baroque

François Collignon (1609 – 18 January 1687) was an engraver, print-seller and publisher from the Duchy of Lorraine.

== Biography ==
=== Early life ===
Collignon was born in Nancy, Duchy of Lorraine to Jean and his wife, Jeanne Collignon. He was baptized on 21 January 1610. After completing his training in the studio of the draftsman and engraver Jacques Callot around 1630, Collignon moved to Augsburg in 1631. There, he worked under the German historical painter Johann Matthias Kager, producing, among other things, a reproduction of Kager’s painting Solomon Receiving the Queen of Sheba.

In the mid-1630s, Collignon moved to Italy where he continued his studies and established his own business. From 1634 to 1636, he resided in Rome, where he formed a lifelong friendship with the draftsman and etcher Stefano della Bella – a bond that fostered a fruitful collaboration. In 1634, in partnership with the painter Andrea Sacchi, he illustrated a commemorative volume commissioned by Cardinal Antonio Barberini to mark the visit of the Polish prince Alexander Charles Vasa in Rome.

Beginning in 1636, Collignon was active in Paris, where he proved highly prolific over the following years. During this time, he created etchings based on numerous drawings by Stefano della Bella and, for the first time, ventured into publishing – issuing works by della Bella and other artists as well. Furthermore, he collaborated with della Bella on the etching and engraving of designs by the military topographer Sébastien Pontault de Beaulieu.

=== Publisher ===
Although he started as an engraver, Collignon became a major figure in publishing and print-selling. Around 1646 he left Paris for Rome, where he remained active until his death. He soon became a prominent figure in the Roman publishing scene, focusing primarily on the publication of works by other artists. Artists he produced works for included Pietro Testa, Cornelis Bloemaert, Pietro da Cortona, Nicolas Poussin, Charles Le Brun, Simon Vouet, and Jean Le Pautre. Collignon’s died in Rome on 18 January 1687. After his death, the Flemish publisher and engraver Arnold van Westerhout, who lived in Rome at the time, bought his entire stock.

== Gallery ==
View of the Temple of the Sun in Rome, engraved by Collignon after Israel Silvestre, National Gallery of Art, Washington, D.C.

Siege of Grave by Alexander Farnese, engraved by Collignon after Michelangelo Cerquozzi, 1647, Rijksmuseum, Amsterdam

View of St. Peter's Basilica, 1663, Skokloster Castle

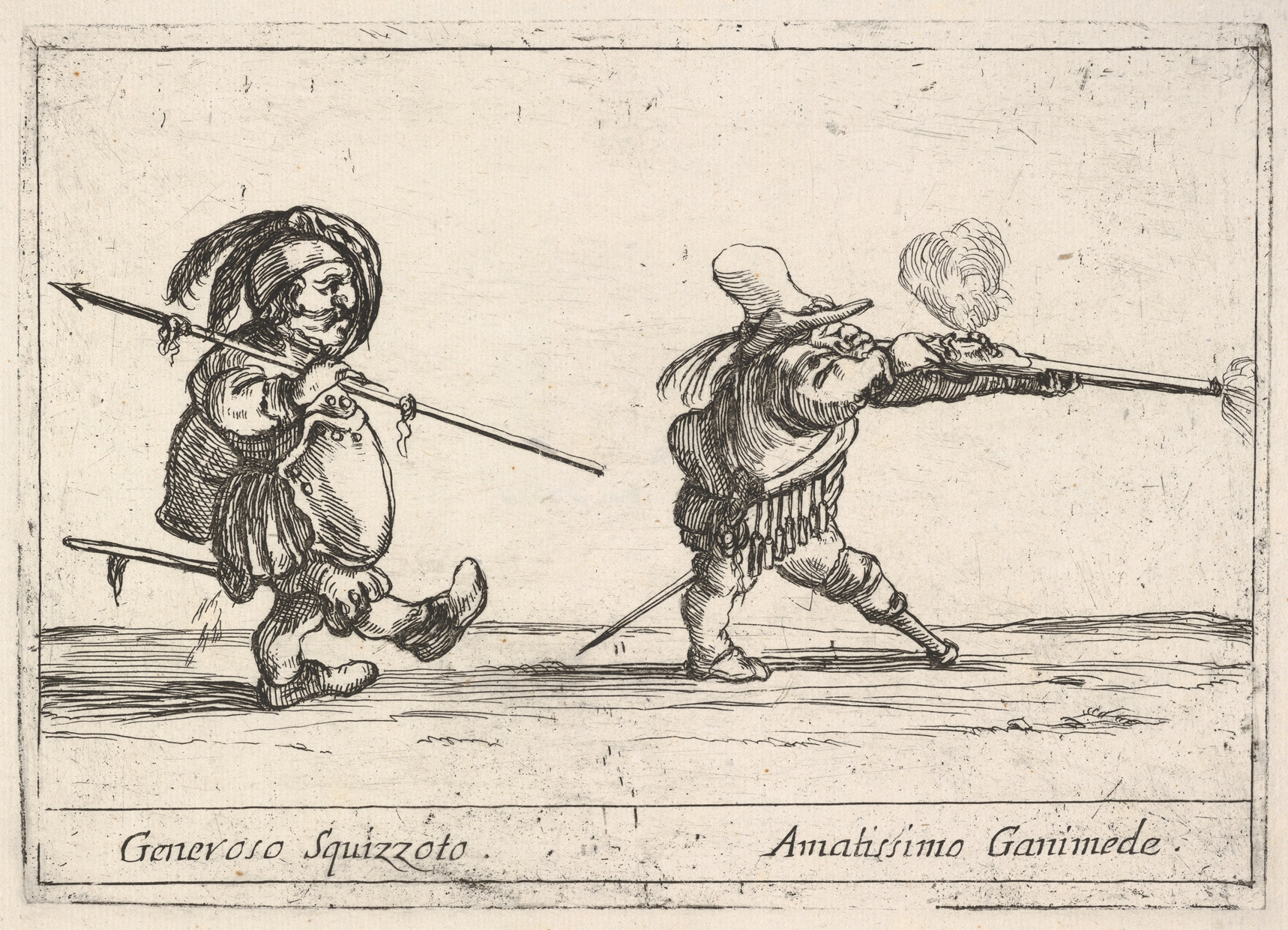
Engraving by Collignon after Jacques Callot from the series Six grotesques (Six pièces de figures grotesques). 1684, Metropolitan Museum of Art, New York

Landscape with ruins, engraved by Collignon after Jacques Callot, Rijksmuseum, Amsterdam

Battle of Chudniv, Royal Collection

View of Nantes, engraved by Collignon after a drawing by L. de Lincler, Rijksmuseum, Amsterdam

View of Tours, engraved by Collignon after a drawing by L. de Lincler, Rijksmuseum, Amsterdam
