= Persakis =

Persakis (Greek: Περσάκης) is a Greek surname. Notable people with the surname include:

- Ioannis Persakis (1877–1943), Greek athlete who competed at the 1896 Summer Olympics
- Petros Persakis (1879–1952), Greek gymnast who competed at the 1896 Summer Olympics

== See also ==
- Persaki
