= Gio =

Gio or GIO may refer to:

== Science and technology ==
- G_{i/o}, protein subunits
- GIO (computer bus standard), a computer bus
- GIO (software), a library for accessing virtual file-systems
- 11084 Giò, a main belt asteroid
- Gibioctet, a unit of digital information
- Glucocorticoid-induced osteoporosis
- Samsung Galaxy Gio, a mobile telephone

== Other ==
- Gio (nickname), and a list of people with the nickname
- Gío, a parish in Asturias, Spain
- Gio (Black Clover), a character in the manga series Black Clover
- GIO Insurance, an Australian insurance company
- Giò lụa, a Vietnamese pork sausage
- Gio Ponti (horse), an American Thoroughbred race horse
- Ibanez GIO, a series of guitars
- General Inspection Office (Iran)
- Government Information Office, a former agency of the Republic of China (Taiwan)
- Dan language or Gio, spoken by the Gio people
- Gio (rapper), a German rapper

== See also ==
- Geo (disambiguation)
