= Diocese of Thizica =

Roman Catholic titular see

Thizica was a civitas in the Roman province of Africa Proconsularis. It served as a Roman Catholic diocese. The city's ruins are located at present-day Techga or Tchegga in northern Tunisia.

== Bishopric ==
The names of two early bishops of the see are known:

- Novellus (mentioned by Saint Augustine of Hippo as condemned to death by Donatists (heretics) in 313)
- Vitalia (mentioned in 646)

The modern use of the diocese as a titular see began in 1967. There have been four bishops since that time:

- Edwin Broderick (March 1967 – March 1969)
- Alfonso Nava Carreón (May 1969 – March 1990)
- Edwin Frederick O'Brien (February 1996 – March 1998)
- Louis Dicaire (February 1999 – July 2020)
- Fernando Ortega (August 2023-present)

Of these, O'Brien held the personal title of archbishop.

== Sources and external links ==
- Harnack, 89-96
- (Titular See) Thizicensis
