= Di Giovanni =

Di Giovanni, DiGiovanni, or De Giovanni is a surname. Notable people with these surnames include:

- Bartolomeo di Giovanni (died 1501), early Renaissance Italian painter
- Benvenuto di Giovanni (c. 1436–1509/1518), Italian painter and artist
- Bertoldo di Giovanni (after 1420–1491), Italian sculptor and medallist
- Debra DiGiovanni (born 1972), Canadian stand-up comedian
- George di Giovanni (born 1935), professor of philosophy at McGill University
- Giovanni di Giovanni (c. 1350 – 7 May 1365?), boy executed for sodomy by Florence
- Janine di Giovanni, American author, journalist, and war correspondent
- Katya De Giovanni, Maltese politician
- Matteo di Giovanni (c. 1430–1495), Italian Renaissance artist
- Nick DiGiovanni (born 1996), American chef and Internet personality
- Severino Di Giovanni (1901–1931), Italian anarchist

== See also ==
- Giovani
