= Gia (name) =

Given name

- Pronunciation: /ˈdʒiːə/ JEE-ə
- Gender: female
- Language: English

Origin
- Language: Italian
- Meaning: "God is gracious"

Other names
- Variant forms: Gianna; Giana; Jane

Gia is an English female given name, used as short for the Italian name Gianna (English Jane), Giada (English Jade) or Georgia. (Note: Even though this name does originate from Italian Gianna, it is not used as a given name in Italy and seems to be simply a short form of the name based on the English pronunciation /dʒiˈɑːnə/ jee-AH-nə (different from Italian [ˈdʒanna]).)

== People named Gia ==
- Gia Abrassart, Belgian Congolese journalist and activist
- Gia Allemand (1983–2013), American actress and model
- Gia Carangi (1960–1986), American model
- Gia Carides (born 1974), Australian actress
- Gia Ciambotti (born 1962), American singer
- Gia Crovatin (born 1985), American actress and producer
- Gia Darling (born 1977), transsexual adult film actress
- Gia Farrell (born 1989), American singer
- Gia Gunn, (born 1990) American drag queen
- Gia Johnson (born 1986), British model
- Gia Kourlas, American dance critic
- Gia Maione (1941–2013), American singer and widow of singer Louis Prima
- Gia Mantegna (born 1990), American actress and daughter of actor Joe Mantegna
- Gia Milinovich (born 1969), American-British television presenter and writer
- Gia Pergolini (born 2004), American Paralympic swimmer
- Gia Scala (1934–1972), English-American actress of Italian-Irish descent
- Gia To, (born 1980) French photographer and journalist in videogames
- Gia Ventola, American fashion designer

== Fictional characters named Gia ==
- Gia Campbell, in the soap opera General Hospital
- Gia Goodman, a minor character in the television show Veronica Mars
- Gia Mahan, a secondary character in the television show Full House
- Gia Moran, in the television show Power Rangers Megaforce
- Gia the Jaguar, in the film Madagascar 3: Europe's Most Wanted
- Gia Bennett, in the TV series Euphoria (American TV series)
