= John Gavin Nolan =

American Roman Catholic priest and bishop

John Gavin Nolan (March 15, 1924 – November 17, 1997) was a Catholic bishop who served the Archdiocese for the Military Services.

== Biography ==
Born in Mechanicville, New York, Nolan was ordained a priest of the Roman Catholic Diocese of Albany on June 11, 1949. Nolan was an Assistant Pastor at St. Vincent De Paul Church in Albany from June-September 1949. From 1949-1950, Nolan was an Assistant Pastor at Annunciation Church in Illion. In 1950, Nolan entered Manhattan College for Graduate Studies and graduated in 1953. Also in 1953, Nolan did graduate studies at Catholic University of America graduating in 1954. From 1954-1960, Nolan was a professor of history and librarian at Mater Christi Seminary in Albany. In 1960, Nolan did Graduate Studies at Fordham University graduating in 1962. In 1962, Nolan became secretary for Catholic Near East Welfare Association.

On December 12, 1987, Nolan was appointed titular bishop of Natchesium and auxiliary bishop of the Roman Catholic Archdiocese for the Military Services, USA and was consecrated on January 6, 1988.

== Episcopal succession ==
Catholic Church titles
Preceded by –	Auxiliary Bishop for the Military Services, USA; 1987 – 1997	Succeeded by –
