= Arnold van Westerhout =

Flemish printmaker, painter, draughtsman, publisher and printer

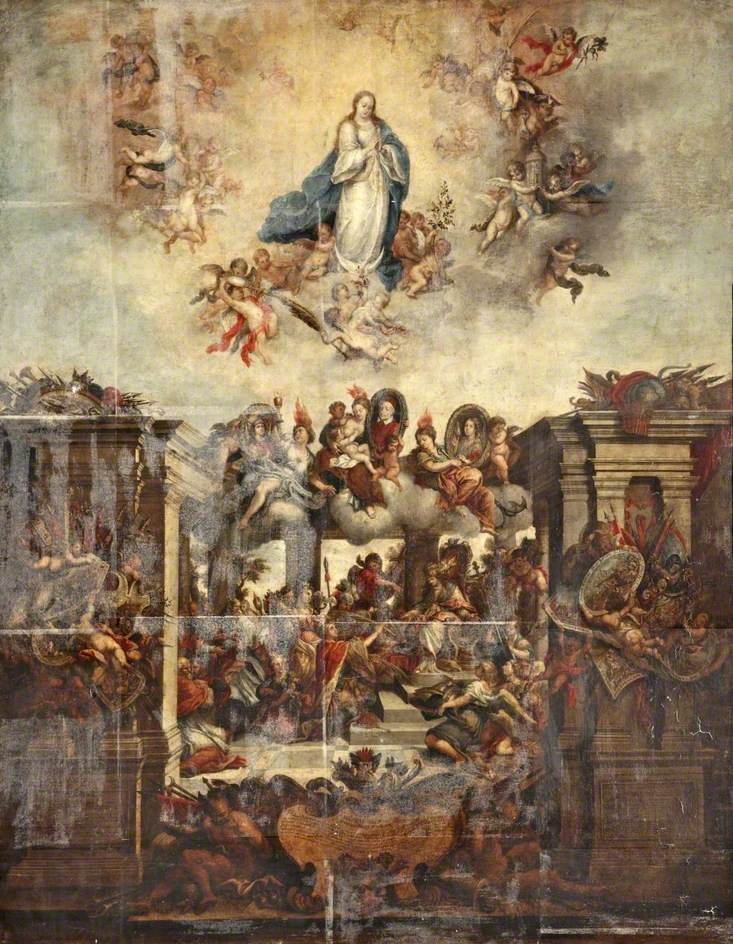
Theological Allegory with the Assumption of the Virgin

Arnold van Westerhout or Arnoldo van Westerhout (Antwerp, 21 February 1651 – Rome, 18 April 1725) was a Flemish printmaker, painter, draughtsman, publisher and printer. He trained in Antwerp but mainly worked abroad, and in particular in Italy. He settled in Rome where he was a prominent printmaker and publisher. The artist is less known for his paintings, which covered religious and genre subjects, than for his work as a printmaker and publisher.

== Life ==
Arnold van Westerhout was born in Antwerp. As he showed a talent for drawing at a young age, his father placed him in apprenticeship with Alexander Goetiers (1637–1686), also of Antwerp. Arnold's younger brother Balthasar later also apprenticed with Goetiers. Arnold was registered as an apprentice in the records of the Guild of Saint Luke of Antwerp in the guild year 1665–1666. He became a master of the Guild in the guild year 1673–1674 and was registered as a painter. Arnold allegedly worked from 1665 to 1673 in Prague in the studio of his older brother Alexander, which must then have been during his period of apprenticeship.

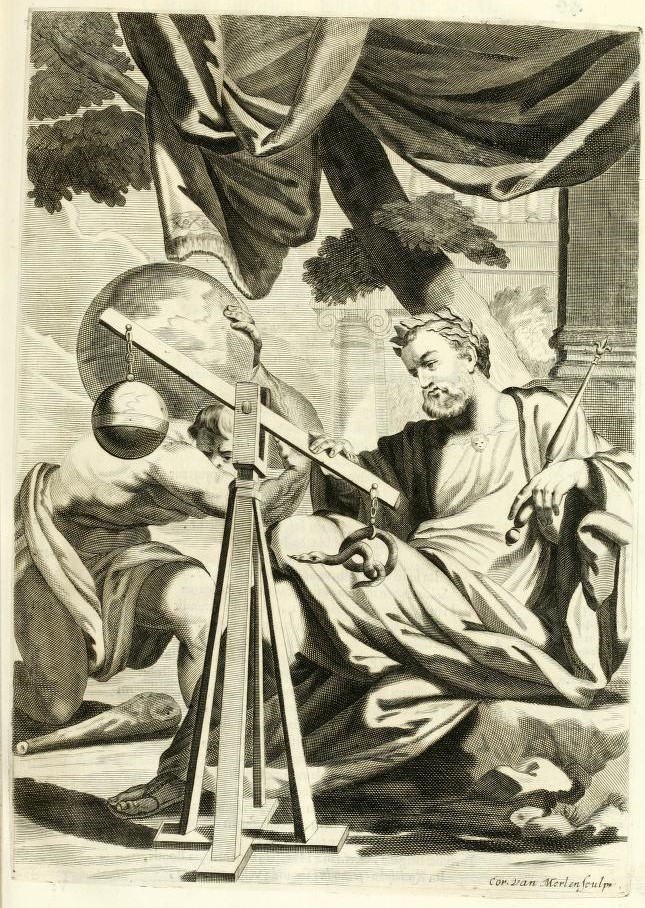
Rudolf II, Holy Roman Emperor engraved by Cornelis van Merlen after Arnold van Westerhout's design

While in Antwerp Arnold worked mainly as a draughtsman and as an engraver of portraits after his own design or those of other masters. In 1675 he drew the title plate of an illustrated work on mushrooms, the Theatrum fungorum oft Het toneel der campernoelien by Frans van Sterbeeck which was published in Antwerp in the same year by Jozef Jacobs. The title plate and 33 of the 36 other plates were engraved by Pieter van Sickeleers. Van Westerhout had left Antwerp and was residing in Venice in 1679. Here he worked on some publications of the publisher Giovanni Palazzi (1640–1703) in collaboration with his fellow Antwerp engravers Pieter van Sickeleers and Cornelis van Merlen. An example is the Aquilae Austriacae pars secunda published in 1679 in Venice, which contains illustrations engraved by Pieter van Sickeleers and Cornelis van Merlen after designs by Arnold van Westerhout.

By 1681 van Westerhout had left Venice and was living in Rome. Here he is recorded as living in the residence of the Dutch painter and engraver Cornelis Bloemaert. He maintained a workshop near the Church of St. Ignatius of Loyola at Campus Martius. Cornelis Bloemaert named him the executor of his will. Cornelis Bloemaert died in 1692. From 1685 to 1686 the printer Jacques Blondeau lived with van Westerhout.

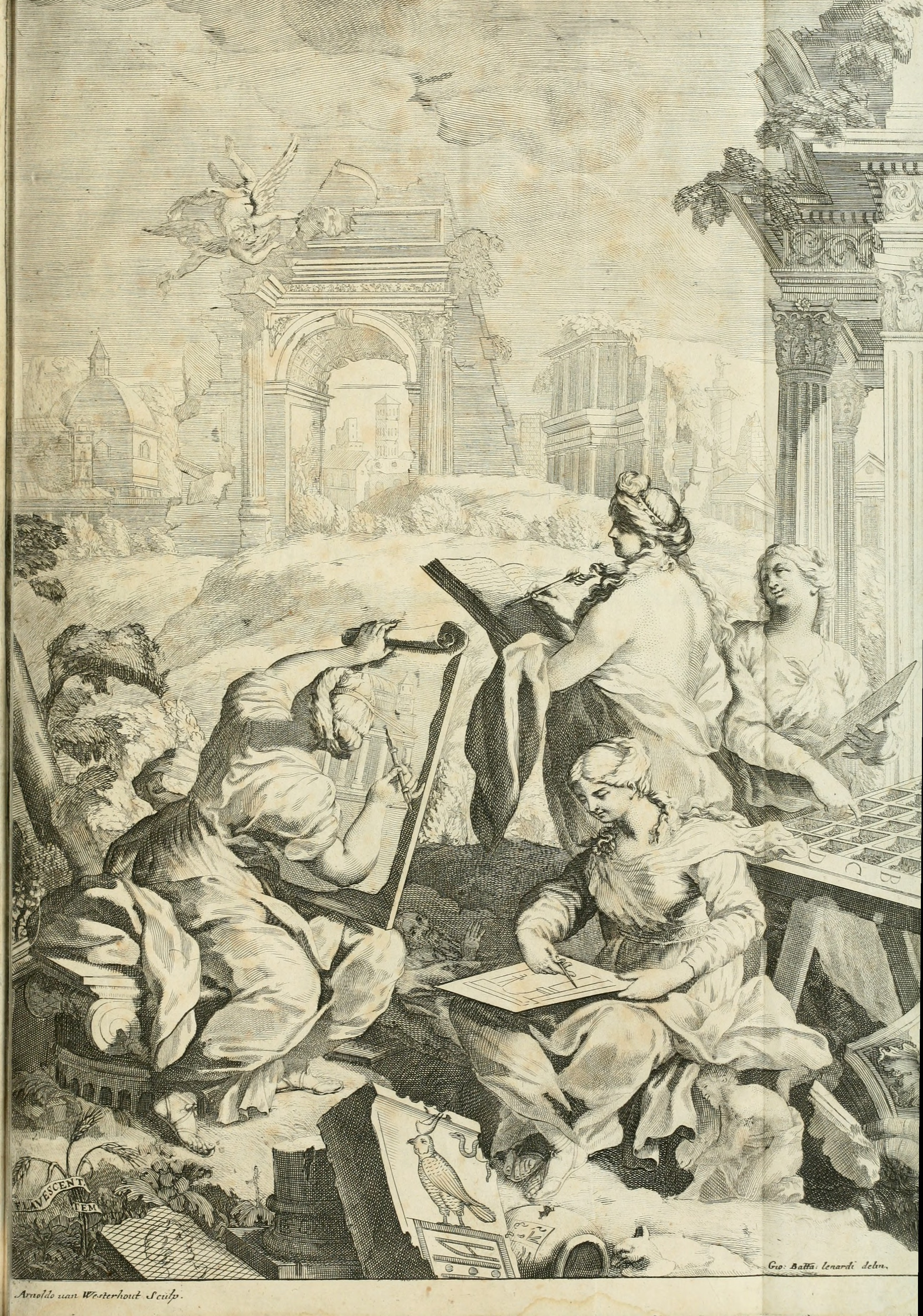
Frontispiece of Vetera Monimenta, engraved by van Westerhout after design by Giovanni Battista Lenardi

Not long after moving to Rome, van Westerhout was able to become one of the city's most prominent engravers. He bought the stock of French engraver, print-seller and publisher François Collignon in 1687. One of his biggest assignments was the engraved illustrations of Giovanni Ciampini's Vetera Monimenta, an illustrated history of mosaics. Van Westerhout cut the engravings after drawings by Giovanni Battista Lenardi. The first volume of this work was published in 1690. Lenardi and van Westerhout collaborated for several years on other projects, including a large canvas entitled the Theological Allegory with the Assumption of the Virgin (Liverpool, Walker Art Gallery). During the 1680s and between 1693 and 1719, he lived in Salita di S.Giuseppe at Capo le Case near the parish of Sant'Andrea delle Fratte.

His prints in the period from 1686 to 1697 mention the address 'alli Cesarini', which suggests that he had a shop there. He was in Florence for a brief period from the end of 1691 to early 1692 before returning to Rome. From that time onwards he referred to himself as the 'engraver to Grand Prince Ferdinando de' Medici' until Ferdinando's death in 1713. From 1716, he was granted the title of official engraver of the Duke of Parma. In the period from 1720 to 1725 the artist lived in Rome at Vicolo de Chiodarolli, in the Via delle Muratte, near the Trevi Fountain.

Arnold was married twice in Italy. In Florence he married Angela de Pulco from Cittâ di Castello and in Rome he married Magdalena Antonini, the widow of Danieli, from Fiano. He died without an heir in Rome on 18 April 1725. His stock was taken over by the Roman merchant Giacomo Billy, who had a shop near the Santa Maria in Vallicella church (the Chiesa Nuova).

In the Vite Di Pittori (Lives of painters) written by Francesco Maria Niccolò Gabburri between 1730 and 1742 a nephew of Westerhout is mentioned. This nephew trained with him in etching and engraving and lived and worked in Florence. Here he is said to have etched, among other things, the famous city views painted by Giuseppe Zocchi. The Italian engraver Giovanni Girolamo Frezza studied engraving and etching in the workshop of van Westerhout in Rome.

== Work ==
=== General ===
Arnold van Westerhout trained originally in Antwerp as a painter and was registered in the local Guild as a painter. He is now known mainly for his work as a printmaker and publisher.

=== Print work ===
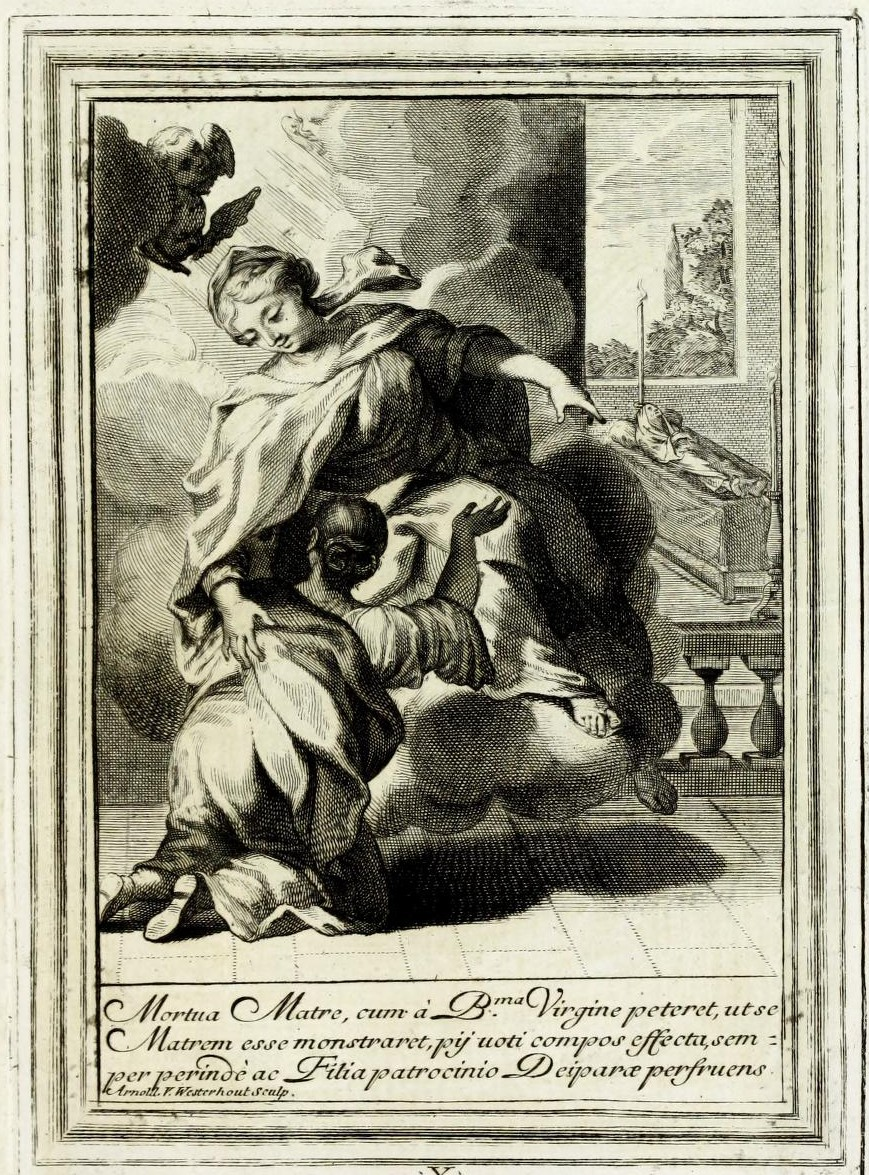
The death of Teresa of Ávila's mother from the Vita effigiata della serafica vergine S. Teresa di Gesu

Arnold van Westerhout is the author of 682 engraved works, most of which were produced during his residence in Italy. The subject matter of the works he engraved and published includes religious, secular and historical subjects and portraits. Some of the works are engravings after paintings of prominent painters of the 17th century such as Carlo Maratta and Guido Reni. On some of these he collaborated with another Flemish engraver active in Rome called Robert van Audenaerde, of whom he seems to have been the publisher.

In addition to the Vetera Monimenta (1690–1698), van Westerhout worked on other publication projects, including the following:

- Il Greco in Troia, festa teatrale rappresentata in Firenze per le nozze de' serenissimi sposi Ferdinando terzo principe di Toscana, e Violante Beatrice principessa di Baviera by Matteo Noris, published by the Stamperia di S.A.S. in Florence in 1688. This book publishes an opera presented on 29 January 1689 in the Teatro della Pergola, with music by Giovanni Maria Pagliardi. It contains 16 folded plates depicting scenes from the opera, two of which are signed by Arnold van Westerhout. The opera was produced on the occasion of the marriage of Ferdinand III de Medici and Violante-Béatrice of Bavaria.
- Raggvaglio della solenne comparsa, fatta in Roma gli otto di gennaio MDCLXXXVII. dall'illvstrissimo, et eccellentissimo signor conte di Castelmaine ambasciadore straordinario della Sagra Real Maestà di Giacomo Secondo rè d'Inghilterra, Scozia, Francia, et Ibernia, difensore della fede alla Santa Sede Apostolica, in andare pvblicamente all'vdienza della Santità di Nostro Signore Papa Innocenzo Vndecimo by John Michael Wright, published by Domenico Antonio Ercole in Rome in 1687 with plates engraved by Arnold van Westerhout after designs by Giovanni Battista Lenardi. This books recounts the entry of Roger Palmer, the first Earl of Castlemaine, into Rome as English ambassador. The illustrations depict the numerous works of art which Roger Palmer commissioned to celebrate and adorn his entry into Rome. Of these 10 depict elaborate carriages.
- Numismata pontificum Romanorum quae a tempore Martini V. usque ad annum M.DC.XCIX. : vel authoritate publica, vel privato genio in lucem prodiere, explicata, ac multiplici eruditione sacra, & prophana illustrata, by Filippo Buonanni, published in Rome by Dominicus Antonius Hercules in 2 volumes in 1689 and 1690. This book is a numismatic work and contains illustrations some of which were engraved by Arnold van Westerhout.

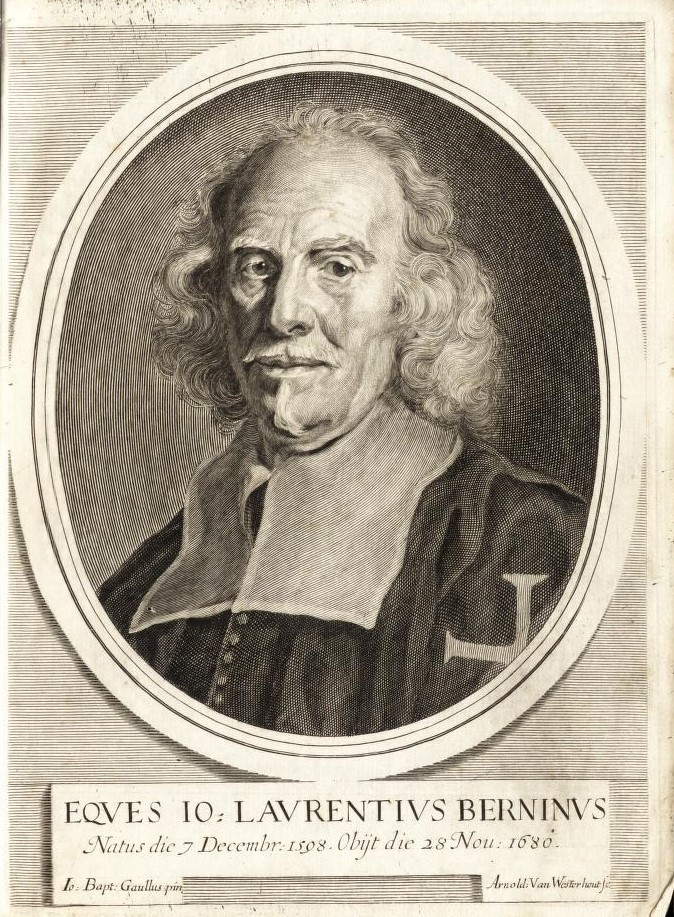
Portrait of Gian Lorenzo Bernini

- De sacris aedificiis a Constantino Magno constructis: synopsis historica by Giovanni Giusto Ciampini, published by Romae : Ex typographia Joannis Jacobi Komarek, Bohemi, apud S. Angelum custodem in Rome in 1693. The frontispiece was engraved by Arnold van Westerhout after a design by Giovanni Battista Lenardi.
- Musaeum Kircherianum, sive, Musaeum a P. Athanasio Kirchero in Collegio Romano Societatis Jesu jam pridem incoeptum nuper restitutum, auctum, descriptum, & iconibus illustratum, by Filippo Bonanni, published in 1709 in Rome by Giorgio Placho. This book is a description of the collection of objects in the Museum Kircherianum. The portrait plate of Francesco Maria Marescotti Ruspoli was engraved by Arnold van Westerhout after a design by Antonio David.
- Vita del cavalier Gio. Lorenzo Bernino, by Domenico Bernini, published in 1713 in Rome by Rocco Bernabò. This is a biography of Gian Lorenzo Bernini. The frontispiece portrait of Gian Lorenzo Bernini was engraved by Arnold van Westerhout after a design by Giovanni Battista Gaulli.
- Vita effigiata della serafica vergine S. Teresa di Gesu, fondatrice dell'Ordine Carmelitano Scalzo by Arnold van Westerhout, published in 1716 in Rome by Arnold van Westerhout. This is an illustrated life of the Catholic Saint Teresa of Ávila. The illustrations were made and engraved by Arnold van Westherhout.
- Gabinetto armonico pieno d'instromenti ti sonori : indicati, spiegati, e di nuovo corretti ed accresciuti, by Filippo Bonanni, published in 1723 in Rome by Giorgio Placho. This book contains descriptions and illustrations of musical instruments. The second plate of which was engraved by Arnold van Westherhout after a design by Stefano Spargioni.
- Lettera nella quale vengono espressi colle figure in rame, e dilucidati colle annotazioni, by Giangrisostomo Scarfò, published in 1739 in Rome by Bonifacia Viezzeri. This book describes many works of art from antiquity (Egypt, Greece, Rome) including coins, sculptures, agates, inscriptions, etc. The illustrations were designed and engraved by Arnold van Westerhout.
- Ritratti de' prepositi generali della Compagnia di Gesu incisi da Arnoldo Westherhout aggiuntivi i brevi ragguagli delle loro vite by Niccolo Galeotti, published posthumously in Rome in 1748, with portraits engraved by Arnold van Westerhout. This book contains biographies of prominent figures of the Society of Jesus.

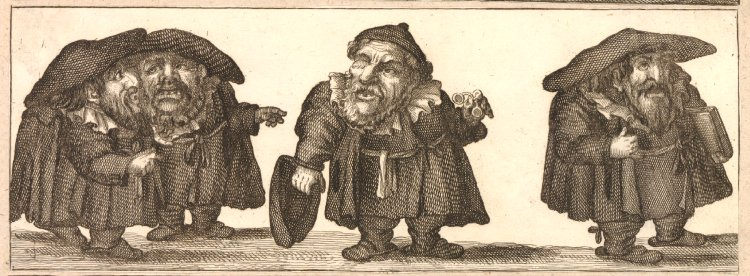
The lawyers from the Raccolta di Diverse Caricature

Venanzio Monaldini published in 1765 in Rome a series of eleven plates (plus a title plate) under the title Raccolta di Diverse Caricature delineate ed incise da Arnoldo van Westerhout Obra per la prima polta date in luce. Ten of the plates depict caricatural figures in groups of three or four. The eleventh plate shows a pig's slaughter. These plates were allegedly designed and engraved by Arnold van Westerhout and sold from his bottega in Rome in 1687. The Italian art historian Alberto Milano is of the view that this series of plates has nothing to do with the original one published by van Westerhout in Rome in 1687. He claims that the publisher Monaldini used the well known name of van Westerhout for promotional reasons.

=== Paintings ===
Even though van Westerhout was admitted as a master of the Guild of St. Luke of Antwerp as a painter, only very few of his canvases have been identified to date. His known paintings include two works depicting peasants which were described in the collection of the Florentine Marquis Gregorio Alessandro Capponi in 1718 and a St. Ambrose refusing the entrance of the church to the Emperor Theodosius (dated 1675–1678) in the Church of Our Lady in Dendermonde, Belgium. In addition there is the Theological Allegory with the Assumption of the Virgin (Liverpool, Walker Art Gallery) which he painted in collaboration with Giovanni Battista Lenardi.
