= Eva Persaki =

Eva Persaki (Greek: Εύα Περσάκη is a Greek painter. She was born in Paris and was raised in an artistic environment as she was the daughter of the painter Gianna Persaki and the Hungarian French sculptor László Szabó. Her stepfather was the Greek sculptor Costas Koulentianos and she was a student of painter Panos Sarafianos.

Eva Persaki studied literature at the University of Sorbonne and graduated from the Greek Fine Arts School first as a student of the painter George Mavroidis and then of Kostas Xinopoulos professor of Vyzantine Hagiography. During her studies she was granted of a two-year scholarship from the Greek government.

While in Paris, she did lessons with Hayter who was Pablo's Picasso teacher in engraving and then she also studied at the Academy of Grande Chaumiere. In 1978, under a scholarship of the Indian Embassy she went to Benares to study miniatures and following she studied Tibetan Painting lessons Tang-ka, in Nepal for three years.

Her work is mainly diversified in portraits, landscapes and hagiography and can be recognised from the vibrant colours. Paintings are located in Paris, United States, England, Italy, Japan, Switzerland, Ireland, Greece and in private collections including the Panayotis D. Cangelaris Painting Collection in Athens.

She is a founding member of the Picturial Association in Syros island and lives and works between Athens, Syros and London.

== Group exhibitions ==
2013 Syros Open Art Studios

2012 Municipal Art Gallery, Piraeus

2011 Scala Shop, Mykonos

2011 Art Centre, Vasilisis Sofias, Athens

2008 Gallery Cafe, Athens

2008 Culture Organisation Athens Town

2007 Milo Gallery, Athens

2007 Aenaon Gallery, Athens

2006 Centre of Arts and Human Rights, Athens

2005 Centre of Arts and Human Rights, Athens

2002 Gallery Skoufa, Athens

2001, Apothiki Gallery, Syros

1994 Epipeda Gallery, Athens

1993 Epipeda Gallery, Athens

1986 "Women Artists", Sillogi Gallery, Athens

1985 Art Organization of Greece, Athens

1977 Luxembourg Museum, Paris

1975 Library Plethron

== Individual exhibitions ==
2010 Ermoupoleia 2010, Syros

2008 Ermoupoleia 2008, Syros

2007 Milo Gallery, Athens

2007 Pontoporos Gallery, Paros

2006 Pontoporos Gallery, Paros

2007 Christina Karela Gallery, Athens

2007 Cosmos Gallery, Hermoupolis, Syros

2005 Art Gallery Lavyrinth, Katerini

2003 Ermoupoleia 2003, Syros

1998 Culture Organisation, Athens Townhall

1997 Aenaon Gallery (Bulgarian Embassy)

1994 Epipeda Gallery, Athens

1990 Cultural Centre, Syros

1988 Loulaki Gallery, Hydra

1985 Artistic Centre Ora, Athens
