= Gianna Talone =

American writer

Gianna Talone Sullivan
- Born: 1957 (age 68–69)
- Occupations: Pharmacist, writer
- Notable work: I Am Your Jesus of Mercy

Gianna Talone Sullivan is a clinical pharmacist by profession and is the author of a series of books called I Am Your Jesus of Mercy that report visions of Jesus and Mary.

== Philanthropy ==
In 1991, Talone-Sullivan founded Mission of Mercy, a non-profit charitable organization that provides free medical care, dental care, and prescriptions to under-served populations.

== Messages ==
Talone claimed to have received 250 messages from Jesus between 1988 and 1995 which spoke about spiritual formation and the tenets of the Catholic faith. On January 26, 1989, Talone described how Jesus taught her the difference between envy and jealousy, in that jealousy is pure hatred and that envy is the path that leads to jealousy.

The message she claimed to receive on December 13, 1989, carried a similar tone and advocated faithfulness. It stated that fidelity is the strongest bond between mankind and the Holy Trinity. The notions of self-abandonment to God and trust in Jesus are repeated throughout the messages.

She also reported over 3000 messages from Mary, whom she describes as a beautiful woman usually dressed in a white or gold robe, with dark brown hair and blue eyes. She says that sometimes, Mary holds a rosary; and on occasion, she carries the infant Jesus. Sometimes Mary speaks in English, and on a few occasions, in Italian. On December 30, 1989, she wrote that the Blessed Virgin invited everyone to follow Jesus by praying with their hearts.

On August 19, 1992, she wrote a message that she attributed to Jesus: "I am truly guiding you if you trust that I am. This is self-abandonment to the Providence of God." The phrase "I am" appears frequently in the messages and is part of the title of the book series, I Am Your Jesus of Mercy.

In 1993, Talone-Sullivan re-located from Arizona to Fairfield, Pennsylvania, just outside Emmitsburg, Maryland, and began to share her messages during weekly meetings at St. Joseph's Catholic Church in Emmitsburg. After attracting followers from across the country for seven years, the Archdiocese of Baltimore asked her to share her messages elsewhere.

The message also emphasized the power of human prayers when they are united with the prayers of Mary. The message of July 3, 1997, attributed to the Virgin Mary directs everyone to pray for the Catholic Church and the Pope.

In the summer of 2004, a group of people invited Talone-Sullivan to hold a monthly meeting at a farm outside of Taneytown. Attendance at these meetings grew until they were moved to the Lynfield Complex in 2005.

Her later messages that continued into 2007 are attributed to Our Lady of Emmitsburg and at times have the form of prophecies. The prophecies warn of turbulent times ahead and refer to four stages of Trials and Tribulations, Eucharistic Reign, Illumination and Purification.

On June 1, 2008, Talone-Sullivan delivered what has been termed the "message of the two suns". The message reads in part: "Even your governments and the Church authorities already have knowledge of the stars aligning and its implications upon you. You must not fear but must be prepared, primarily spiritually. After a while, you will see a time when there is another body in orbit around your solar system, coming between Earth and the Sun and leading to tremendous devastation. Approximately 60-70% of the world’s population, as you know it, will cease. Of those who survive, 60% of them could die of disease and starvation."

== Archdiocesan view ==
The Phoenix, Arizona Bishop Thomas J. Obrien allowed these events to continue and did not approve or condemn them, after his 1990s investigations found nothing wrong. In many cases, almost the entire church congregations at St. Maria Goretti Church (on Thursday evenings) witnessed hearing the Virgin Mother Mary's voice, thanking them for their prayers.

On September 8, 2000, officials from the Roman Catholic Archdiocese of Baltimore issued a statement that they found no basis to support her messages as having an extraordinary source and found it impossible to permit Talone and her followers to hold any prayer services within the Catholic Church. The statement from the archdiocese regarding the alleged mystical events, stated "it finds elements in them that cannot be reconciled with the teaching of the Church, including material that deals with predictions for the future and visions of an apocalyptic nature". The officials found the alleged apparitions as not of a supernatural origin and directed that the prayer service with the messages at St. Joseph's Church in Emmitsburg, Maryland be discontinued.

On June 12, 2001, Cardinal William Keeler, of Baltimore's Archdiocese, convened a commission of three priests to interview witnesses and examine Sullivan's alleged visions. The commissioners spent one hour with Gianna alone and two more hours with mystical and Marian theologians Fr. Ed O'Connor, CSC Fr. Joseph Iannuzzi and Fr. Robert Faricy, SJ

On June 7, 2003, having consulted with the Holy See and received appropriate authorization, Rev. Monsignor Richard W. Woy, Chancellor of the Archdiocese of Baltimore issued a decree declaring the visions of Talone "constant de non supernaturalitate" and prohibiting any public activities relating to the alleged apparitions in the churches, oratories, or other property of the Archdiocese. This was issued in spite of strong defenses of the authenticity of these events by some notable Marian and mystical theologians: Fr. Rene Laurentin, Fr. Edward O'Connor, CSC and Fr. Kieran Kavanaugh, OCD; Fr. Jacques Daley, O.S.B.

On October 8, 2008, Most Rev. Edwin O'Brien, Archbishop of Baltimore, issued a Pastoral Advisory warning the faithful that Talone's messages and revelations were not authentic and warned Talone-Sullivan to discontinue the distribution of her messages as gravely harmful to the spiritual life of the faithful. This Pastoral Advisory was addressed "to the Christian faithful of the Archdiocese of Baltimore" and distributed to every Catholic Church in Maryland. The letter from Archbishop O’Brien warned Gianna Sullivan not to disseminate in any way, by her own person or by any other person, by electronic means or any other means, on any church property or in any public or private place any messages. He then warns others not to disseminate her messages because it is harmful to the church, and he hopes that this will stop the confusion of the faithful. The Archbishop's censure has been strongly and continually backed by the Vatican and Holy See, starting with a thorough review and statement by Cardinal Joseph Ratzinger, who became Pope Benedict XVI in 2005.

== Publication ==
The 250 lessons written from September 1988 to November 1995, which she attributed to Jesus, were gathered and printed as the first five volumes of the books I Am Your Jesus of Mercy. The sixth volume includes messages attributed to the Virgin Mary and ends with a message on January 7, 1999. The messages were originally published by the Riehle Foundation, and were later published by Queenship Publishing.

== Immaculate Heart of Mary ==
A group of supporters formed the Foundation of the Sorrowful and Immaculate Heart of Mary to disseminate her messages. In July 2005, Gianna Talone-Sullivan's husband Michael appears listed on the board of directors in the Articles of Incorporation of the Foundation of the Sorrowful and Immaculate Heart of Mary. Peter Blanchard is the foundation's treasurer, as well as a member of the foundation's board of directors. Though Talone-Sullivan has publicly asserted that the foundation operates independently, in December 2008, Blanchard said that he and his wife spoke to Sullivan almost daily.
