= Giovanni Sanches =

Brazilian politician (born 1991)

Member of the Legislative Assembly of São Paulo
- Incumbent
- Assumed office 1 February 2027

Personal details
- Born: 5 August 1991 (age 35)
- Party: Liberal Party

Giovanni Giudice Calderon (born 5 August 1991), better known as Giovanni Sanches, is a Brazilian politician who was elected member of the Legislative Assembly of São Paulo in 2026. From 2025 to 2026, he served as secretary of regional administrations of Guarulhos.
