= Gia (protein) =

methuselah-like 5

Identifiers
- Organism: Drosophila melanogaster
- Symbol: mthl5
- Alt. symbols: Gia
- Entrez: 41438
- Orthologs: NCBI: entry; OMA: entry
- RefSeq (mRNA): NM_141869.3
- RefSeq (Prot): NP_650126.2
- UniProt: Q9VGG8

Other data
- Chromosome: 3R: 11.88 - 11.89 Mb
Search for
- Structures: Swiss-model
- Domains: InterPro

Methuselah-like 5 is a protein that in Drosophila is encoded by the Mthl5 (also known as Gia) gene.

Methuselah-like 5 is a G protein coupled receptor (GPCR) that is essential for cardiac development in Drosophila. Deletion of this gene interferes with cardioblast junction proteins, resulting in a broken hearted phenotype similar to other heterotrimeric cardiac G protein mutants. Gia is expressed at stage 13 within bilateral rows of cardioblasts, but during stages 13–15 anterior cardioblasts demonstrate increasing expression while posterior cardioblast expression decreases. By stage 16, Gia expression occurs only in aortic cardioblasts and is not present in the posterior segment cardioblasts. Gia expression only occurs in the aorta and is presently the only gene known in Drosophila with a strictly aortic expression. This gene is also known as Mthl5 (methuselah-like G protein coupled receptor) and is part of a gene family found in insects but not vertebrates. Overexpression of Gia in a transgenic fly model did not cause any cardiac defects.

G-protein-coupled-receptors (GPCR) have a characteristic arrangement of seven transmembrane portions that culminate in an extracellular N-terminus and intracellular C-terminus. More than 200 different GPCRs can be found in Drosophila. GPCRs activation is facilitated by the g-proteins Gα, Gβ, and Gγ. Drosophila have a relatively small number of G-proteins, making them a useful model for the study of GPCR outcomes. Drosophila have a cardiac structure called the dorsal vessel that comprises a tubular structure with a cardioaortic valve and aortic-like outflow. Genes important for cardiac development in Drosophila include NK2, MEF2, GATA, Tbx, and Hand.
