= Giovanni Marradi =

Italian poet (1852–1922)

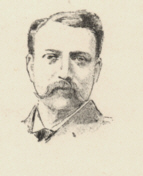
Giovanni Marradi, 1888

Giovanni Marradi (1852–1922) was an Italian poet born at Livorno, Grand Duchy of Tuscany, and educated at Pisa and Florence. At the latter place, he started with others a short-lived review, the Nuovi Goliardi, which made a literary sensation. He became a teacher at various colleges, and eventually an educational inspector in Massa Carrara.

Marradi was much influenced by Carducci, and became known not only as a critic but as a charming descriptive poet, his principal volumes of verse being Canzone moderne (1870), Fantasie marnie (1881), Canzoni e fantasie (1853), Ricordi lirici (1884), Poesie (1887), Nuovi canti (1891) and Ballate moderne (1895).

He is the great-grandfather of the expressionist musician Giovanni Marradi.
