= Gio (singer) =

- Also known as: Gio
- Born: Sergio Bermejo Romero; 6 April 1990 (age 36)
- Origin: Madrid, Spain
- Genres: R&B, pop, soul, jazz
- Occupations: Singer, actor, songwriter, producer
- Instruments: Vocals, piano
- Years active: 2007–present
- Website: Official Page

Gio (born Sergio Bermejo Romero, 6 April 1990) is a Spanish singer, actor, songwriter and producer. He started his career singing gospel music in different choirs from Madrid. Earlier, he became a member of a mix band called D-ViNe, who were finalists in the TV show Salvemos Eurovision in 2008 to represent Spain in the Eurovision Song Contest 2008 with the song "I Do You". In 2008, he signed with AMZ Records after being seen on television by the director of the record company, but that didn't work. After working as an actor in different shows and writing and producing songs for other artists, Gio was a semi-finalist on the TV Show Destino Eurovision 2011. In 2011 Gio released his first solo album Mentiras, Sexo y Gafas de Sol signed with Nat Team Media. In 2013 he became a finalist in the Spanish TV talent-show El Número Uno.

== Discography ==
=== Albums ===
Year	Album	Peak	Sales	Certification
Year	Album	SPA	Sales	Certification
2011	Mentiras, Sexo y Gafas de Sol	-	-	-
2021	TBA	-		-

=== Other charted songs ===
Year	Title	MTV LAT	Album
2012	Camera	No. 1	Mentiras, Sexo y Gafas de Sol

=== Music videos ===
Year	Song
2010	Drama
2011	Sunglasses
2011	Mojito
2012	Elixir
2020	Die Like a Rockstar
2020	Esperando el Amor
2021	MEMO

== Filmography ==
=== Television ===
Year	Show	Character	Type
2008	Objetivo Eurovision	Himself	Talentshow
2011	Destino Eurovision	Himself	Talentshow
2013	El número uno	Himself	Talentshow
2017	La Voz	Himself	Talentshow
