= Louis Dicaire =

Canadian Roman Catholic bishop (1946–2020)

Coat of arms of Louis Dicaire

Louis Dicaire (29 August 1946 – 19 July 2020) was a Canadian Roman Catholic bishop. He was the auxiliary bishop of Saint-Jean-Longueuil.

== Life ==
Born in Montreal, Dicaire was educated at the Collège André-Grasset and Collège Saint-Jean-Vianney. He obtained his bachelor's degree in theology in 1973 and was ordained a priest on 20 January 1974. He went on to earn his master's degree in Pastoral Care at the Université de Sherbrooke in 1983.

From 1983 to 1985, Dicaire went to Rome, Italy, where he studied dogmatic theology and sacramental theology at the Pontifical Gregorian University and the Pontifical Atheneum of St. Anselm. He exercised his ministry in various parishes: Blessed John XXIII, Purification of the Blessed Virgin Mary, St. Colette and St. Joseph of Mont-Royal.

Dicaire served as chaplain to the Mount Royal Scouts and Guides, episcopal secretary and was named a Chaplain of His Holiness by the Holy See. From 1996 to 1999 he was episcopal vicar for the region of East Montreal. In 1999, he was appointed Auxiliary Bishop of Montreal and Titular Bishop of Thizica, for which office he was consecrated on 25 March, by Cardinal Jean-Claude Turcotte. Until 2002, he was responsible for the parish facilities.

In 2001 Dicaire was appointed Vicar General of the Archdiocese for one year. He was named the Rector of the Mary, Queen of the World, Cathedral of Montreal. In June 2004 he was appointed auxiliary bishop of the Roman Catholic Diocese of Saint-Jean-Longueuil. At the Assembly of Catholic Bishops of Quebec, he served as a member of the Committee of the liturgy, theology and social communications.

He died on 19 July 2020 in his native Montreal.
