= Frans Cuyck van Myerop =

Flemish Baroque painter

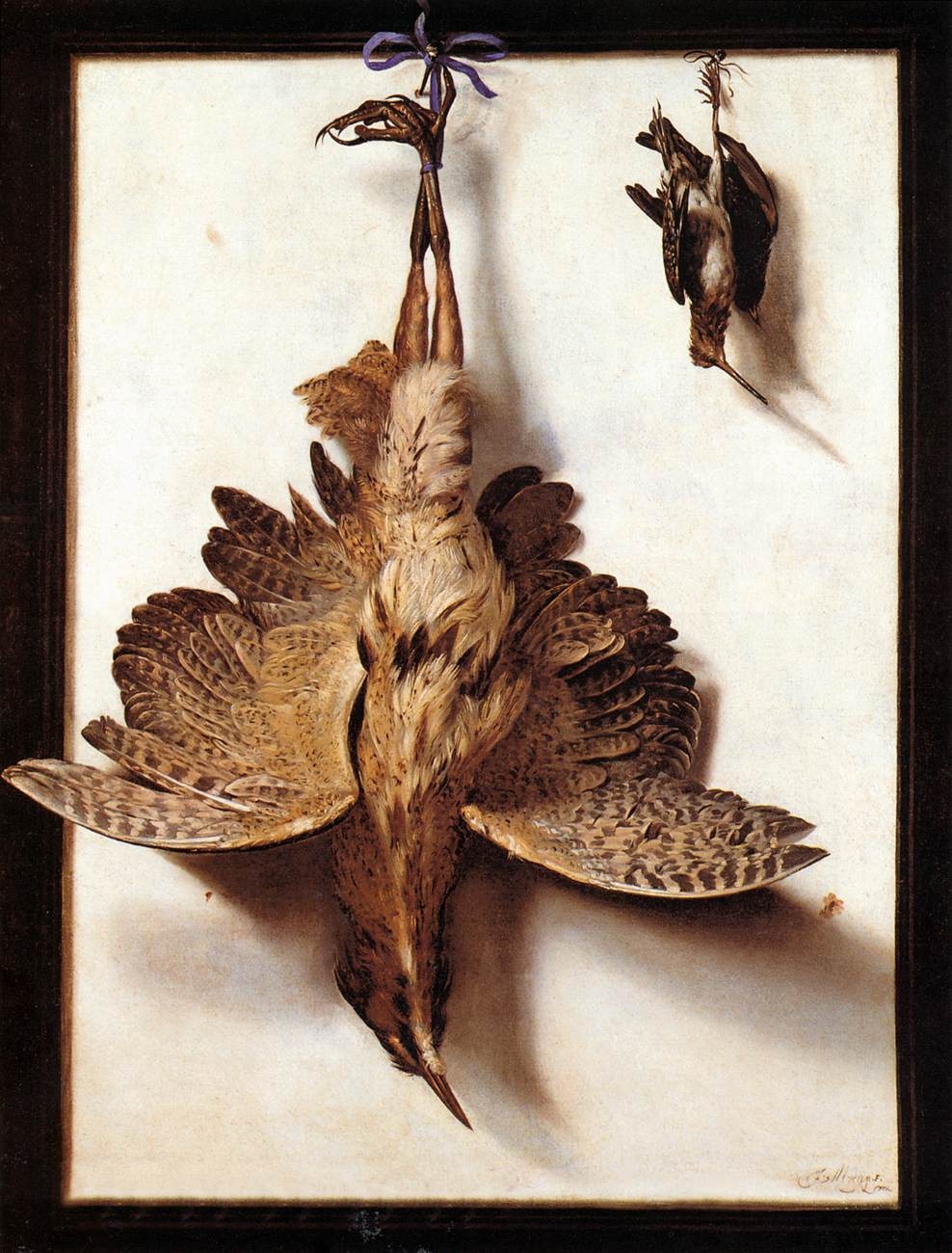
Still-Life with Fowl

Frans Cuyck Van Myerop (ca. 1640, Bruges – 1689, Ghent), was a Flemish Baroque painter.

== Biography ==
He was born in Bruges. In 1665 he became a member of the Guild of St. Luke in Ghent, where he served as deacon from 1679 to 1685. He signed his works with the monogram FVM. Robert van Audenaerd was his pupil.

He is known for his hunting still lifes, trompe-l'oeil still lifes, fruit still lifes, fish still lifes and group portraits.
