= Robert van Audenaerde =

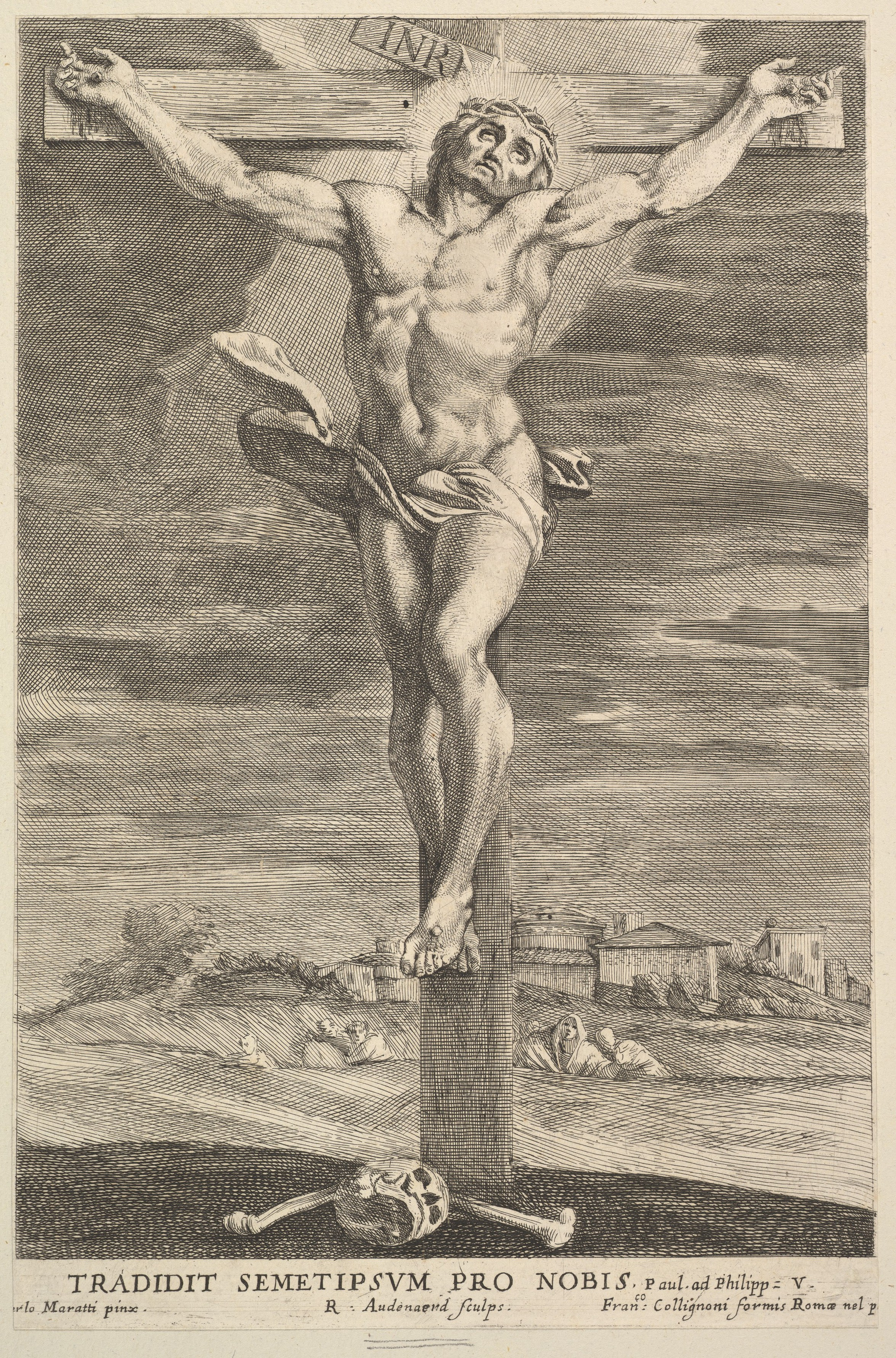
Crucifixion , engraved by Robert van Audenaerde after Carlo Maratta, 1685–1687, Metropolitan Museum of Art, New York

Robert van Audenaerde or Ouden-Aerd (30 September 1663 – 3 June 1743) was a Flemish painter and engraver.

== Life ==
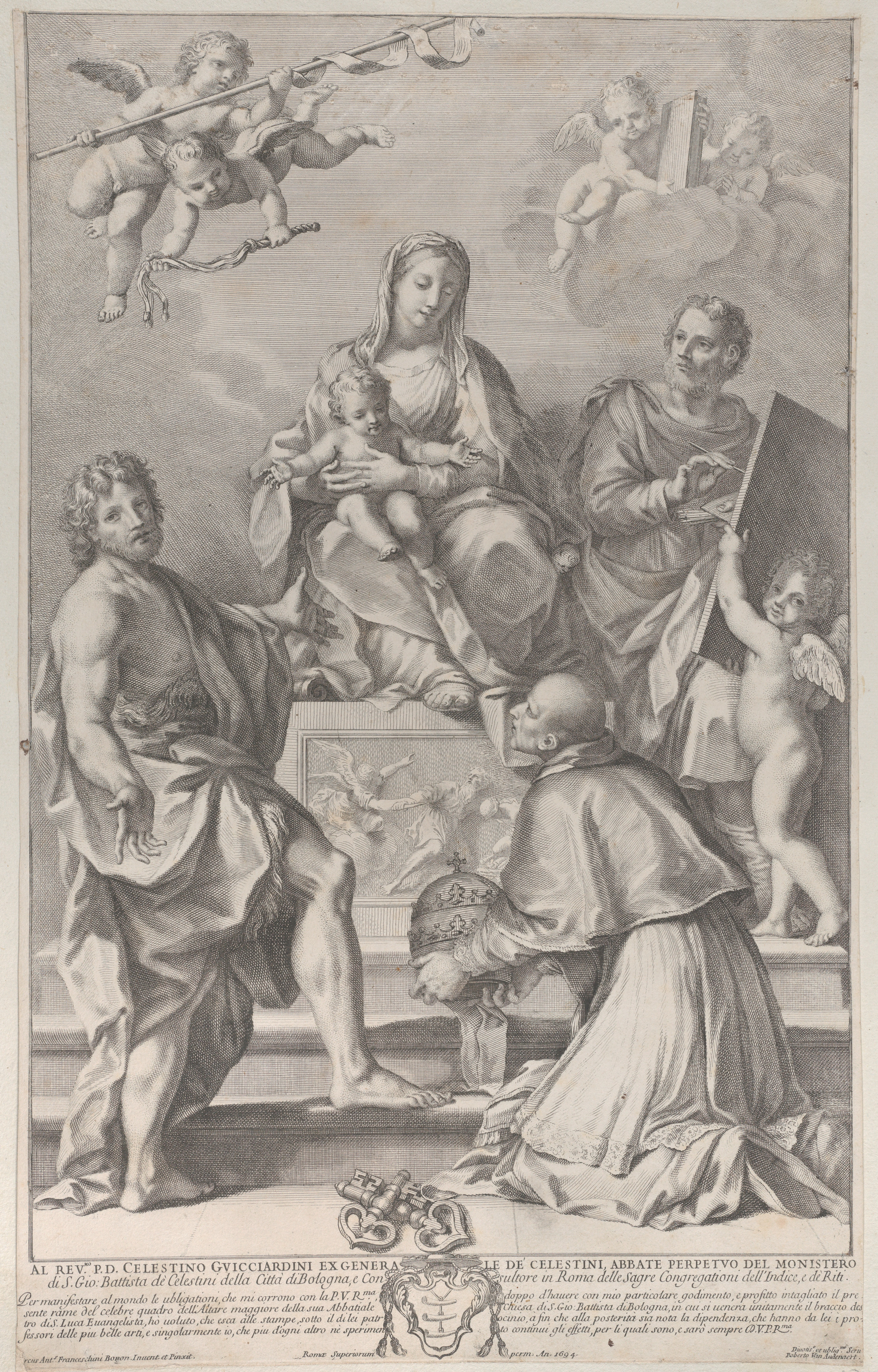
Madonna and Child, 1694, Metropolitan Museum of Art, New York

He was born at Ghent, and was first a scholar of Frans Cuyck van Myerop, but he afterwards studied under Hans van Cleef. When he was twenty-two years of age he went to Rome, where he became a disciple of Carlo Maratti. Under this master he became a good painter of historical subjects. He amused himself with the point in his leisure moments, and some of his plates were shown to Carlo Maratti, who recommended him to devote himself entirely to the art of engraving. He, however, painted several pictures for the churches of his native city, to which he returned after an absence, it is said, of thirty-seven years. He died at Ghent in 1748. His best work is the altar-piece of the high altar in the church of the Carthusians at Ghent, representing 'St. Peter appearing to a group of Monks of that order'. In the church of St. James is a picture by him of 'St. Catharine refusing to worship the False Gods'. Several other works by this master are in the churches and convents of his native city, all of which are painted in the style of Maratti.

== Works ==
The plates which he executed entirely with the graver are not considered equal to those in which he introduced the point. His drawing shows a perfect acquaintance with the human figure, and is very correct. The principal part of his prints are after the pictures of Carlo Maratti. The following is a list of the more important:

=== Portraits ===
- The Cardinal Sacripante; after G. B. Gaulli. 1695.
- The Cardinal Taurusi; after the same.
- The Cardinal Ottoboni; after the same.
- The Cardinal F. Barberini; after C. Maratti.
- The Cardinal Henri de la Grange d'Arquien; after F. Desportes. 1695.
- The Cardinal Giuseppe Aichinto; after G. Passeri.
- The Cardinal Andrea di Santa Croce; after the same.
- The Father Francesco Caraccioli; after A. Procaccini.

=== Subjects after Carlo Maratti ===
- Hagar and Ishmael in the desert; etching.
- The Sacrifice of Abraham; etching.
- Rebekah and the servant of Abraham; etching.
- David with the head of Goliath; etching.
- Bathsheba in the bath.
- The Annunciation.
- The Adoration of the Magi; etching.
- The Flight into Egypt; same.
- The Repose in Egypt; octagon.
- Our Saviour on the Mount of Olives.
- The Crucifixion.
- The dead Saviour in the lap of the Virgin, with the Marys and St. John.
- The Death of the Virgin.
- The Assumption of the Virgin.
- The Virgin Mary with the Infant Jesus distributing chaplets to nuns.
- Mary Magdalene penitent.
- The Martyrdom of St. Blaise.
- St. Anthony of Padua kissing the Infant Jesus.
- St. Philip Neri.
- Janus, first King of Italy, received amongst the Gods.
- Romulus and Remus.
- Apollo and Daphne, in two sheets.
- The Pope Innocent XII. on his throne, at his feet Heresy subdued, and the Four Quarters of the World prostrate.

=== Subjects after different Italian masters ===
- The Triumph of Julius Caesar, a series of ten plates after A. Mantegna.
- The Nativity; after Pietro da Cortona.
- Five etchings — Of the life and death of St. Bibiana; three after Fietro da Cortona, and two after Bernini.
- Hippomenes and Atalanta, a group; after Bernini.
- The Rape of a Sabine woman; after Giovanni da Bologna.
- St. Facundo; after Giac. Brandi.
- The Birth of the Virgin; after Ann. Carracci.
- The Scourging of St. Andrew; after Domenichino.
- St. Andrew led to crucifixion; after the same.
- St. Andrew transported to Heaven; after the same.
- St. Luke painting the portrait of the Virgin; after Marcantonio Franceschini.
- The Wrath of Achilles; after G. B. Gaulli; in three sheets.
