= Giovanni Marradi (musician) =

American musician (born 1952)

Giovanni Marradi (born 1952) is a composer, pianist, arranger and television presenter. He is the son of Italian trumpeter and conductor Alfredo Marradi; his great-grandfather, also named Giovanni Marradi, was a poet and composer.

Giovanni began playing piano at age five, and three years later was sent to study composition and technique with Michael Cheskinov at the Russian Conservatory. As a young adult, he played throughout Europe and the Middle East, but his dream was to come to the U.S. to pursue his music career. After arriving in California as an Italian immigrant, Giovanni played small concerts in Southern California and was asked to perform at Caesar's Palace in Las Vegas. Giovanni became one of the most successful expressionist pianists of our time, as well as a composer, arranger, recording artist, inventor and illustrator. Among his accomplishments, he sold 120,000 CDs in one two-hour segment on the QVC shopping channel. Another record that still stands as one of his outstanding achievements in the music industry is selling over four million CDs during his appearances on QVC and the Home Shopping Network.

Giovanni produced, directed and hosted Giovanni's World of Music, a 28-episode television music series broadcast on stations around the world and distributed by Warner Brothers Television. Both the series and Giovanni himself have been nominated for and received several awards from the National Academy of Television Arts and Sciences, the Telly Awards, EMA and the New York Festivals. His concert specials on PBS are still being aired. Giovanni has recorded over 130 CDs and two DVDs from his televised specials.

In 1995, he formed his own label, NewCastle Records. He released over 60 titles with NewCastle before signing with Atlantic Records in 1998, making his label debut, Destiny.

Giovanni's album Because I Love You won Best New Age CD of the Year in Spain in 2010. In November 2015, he performed a sold-out concert in Beijing, China at the Great Hall of the People to rave reviews. Giovanni's concert at the Great Hall drew much attention and he recently returned to China for a twenty-city concert tour while giving Master Classes for the children in every city on the tour during Feb/March 2019.

== Discography (partial) ==
- 1992 - Boleros
- 1992 - Boleros - Vol.II
- 1992 - Broadway Themes
- 1992 - Promises
- 1993 - Secrets
- 1993 - Giovanni Plays The Beatles Love Songs (2 CDs)
- 1993 - Piano Masterpieces
- 1993 - What If
- 1995 - Come Back To Me
- 1995 - Serenity
- 1995 - Together
- 1996 - Passion
- 1997 - Always
- 1997 - Christmas With Giovanni (Vol.1)
- 1997 - Feelings
- 1997 - Homenaje A Julio Iglesias
- 1997 - Music From The World
- 1997 - Music From The World - Vol.II
- 1998 - Always & Forever
- 1998 - Falling In Love
- 1998 - Destiny
- 1999 - Classic Nights
- 1999 - Eternally
- 1999 - Gracefully
- 1999 - Latin Lovers
- 1999 - Lover's Rendezvous (3 CDs)
- 1999 - Romantically Yours
- 1999 - The Best of Giovanni (2 CDs)
- 2000 - Around The World Vol.1
- 2000 - Around The World - Vol.2
- 2000 - Around The World Vol.3
- 2000 - Broadway Romance
- 2000 - My Valentine (2 CDs)
- 2001 - Remember When
- 2002 - Alone
- 2002 - Cinema Romance
- 2002 - Classical Moods
- 2002 - Colors Of Music
- 2002 - Destiny
- 2002 - Dreams
- 2002 - Dreams Nature & Music
- 2002 - Forever
- 2002 - Mystique
- 2002 - Moonlight Sonata
- 2002 - Mountain Breeze
- 2002 - Nocturnes
- 2002 - Romantique
- 2002 - The Way We Were
- 2002 - Treasures Of Time
- 2003 - Live From Las Vegas
- 2004 - Favorite Love Songs - Vol.1
- 2004 - Favorite Love Songs - Vol.2
- 2004 - Favorite Love Songs - Vol.3
- 2004 - For You
- 2004 - Return To Me
- 2005 - French Classics
- 2005 - Love Letters
- 2005 - Passionate Piano
- 2005 - Winter Moods
- 2006 - Italian Love Songs
- 2007 - Latin Moods
- 2007 - Television Classics
- 2008 - Romantico
- 2008 - The Best of Giovanni (3 CDs)
- 2010 - Because I Love You
- 2010 - Christmas Classics - Vol.1
- 2010 - Christmas Classics - Vol.2
- 2010 - Christmas Classics - Vol.3
- 2010 - Gift of Love
- 2010 - Gift of Christmas - Vol.1
- 2010 - Gift of Christmas - Vol.2
- 2010 - Gift of Christmas - Vol.3
- 2010 - Have a Romantic Christmas
- 2010 - Have a Romantic Christmas - Vol.2
- 2010 - Joy of Christmas 1
- 2010 - Joy of Christmas 2
- 2010 - Joy of Christmas 3
- 2010 - Merry Christmas 1
- 2010 - Merry Christmas 2
- 2010 - Merry Christmas 3
- 2010 - Romantico
- 2010 - Softly
- 2011 - The Giovanni Holiday Collection - A Merry, Merry Christmas To You!
- 2012 - Solo Piano - Broadway Themes II
- 2012 - Sospiro
- 2012 - Because I Love You

== DVDs ==
- 2004 - Giovanni Live From Las Vegas
- 2006 - Timeless
