= Giovanni Pierpaoli =

Italian painter (1833–1911)

Giovanni Pierpaoli (1833 in Fano – 1911) was an Italian painter, depicting portraits, historical canvases, and sacred subjects.

He was a resident of Fano. In 1870 at Parma, he exhibited a portrait of Giovacchino Rossini. Among his religious canvases are the Martyrdom of Santa Eurosia. Legend holds that this Princess of Aquitaine had her hands cut off by Saracen, for refusing him and his faith. The canvas is at a tomb of a parish church in Pesaro. Pierpaoli was Director from 1883 to 1902 of the School of Arts and Crafts of Fano, now Liceo Artistico Apolloni of Fano. He also wrote poetry. The painter Giusto Cespi (1867-1954) was his grandson and pupil. Pierpaoli's self-portrait is in the Pinacoteca Civica of Fano.

== See also ==
Giovanni Pierpaoli, pittore fanese dell' ottocento. by Adolfo Mabellini; Fano, Tipografia letteraria, 1934.
