= Giovanna =

- Pronunciation: Italian: [dʒoˈvanna]
- Gender: Female

Other gender
- Masculine: Giovanni

Origin
- Origin: Hebrew, via Italian
- Meaning: "YHWH/The Lord is Gracious"

Giovanna is an Italian feminine first name. It is the feminine form of the masculine Giovanni, which is the Italian equivalent of John. As such, Giovanna corresponds to names like Joan, etc. In Brazil, the feminine name Giovanna has many variations, with Geovanna being the most common.

== Given name ==
- Giovanna of Savoy (Tsarina Ioanna of Bulgaria) born Princess Giovanna of Savoy and was the last Tsarina of Bulgaria
- Giovanna (singer)
- Giovanna Granieri
- Giovanna Mingarelli
- Giovana Queiroz

== Fictional characters ==
- Giorno Giovanna from Vento Aureo, the fifth part of JoJo's Bizarre Adventure.
