= Giovanni Girolamo Frezza =

Italian engraver (1659–1730)

Giovanni Girolamo Frezza (1659–1730) was an Italian engraver. He was born in Canemorto (Orvinio), near Tivoli, and died in Rome both places being in the Papal States. He was instructed in engraving in Rome by Arnold van Westerhout.

His engravings include:

- Frescoes by Francesco Albani in the Verospi Palace.
- Seventeen plates depicting pictures in the church of Santa Maria in Montesanto at Rome by Niccolo Berrettoni.
- The Virgin suckling the Infant after Lodovico Carracci.
- Holy Family, Assumption of the Virgin, The Twelve Months, Judgment of Paris after Carlo Maratti.
- The Riposo in Egypt called the Zingarella; after Correggio.
- The Descent of the Holy Ghost after Reni.
- Polyphemus on rock, and Galatea and her Nymphs & Polyphemus hurling rock at Acis and Galatea after Sisto Badalocchio from Palazzo Farnese ceiling.
- " V.P. Ioseph Anchieta Soc Iesv in Biblioteca Nacional do Brasil
