= Giovanni Vemba-Duarte =

Dutch-Angolan footballer

Personal information
- Full name: Giovanni Vemba-Duarte
- Date of birth: 21 January 1991 (age 35)
- Place of birth: Cabinda, Angola
- Height: 1.77 m (5 ft 9 1/2 in)
- Position: Forward

Youth career
- 2004–2005: SV Schalkhaar
- 2005–2010: Twente

Senior career*
Years	Team	Apps	(Gls)
2010–2011	Arka Gdynia	12	(0)
2014–2015	VV Hoogeveen		
- * Club domestic league appearances and goals

Giovanni Vemba-Duarte (born 21 January 1991 in Cabinda) is a Dutch-Angolan former professional footballer who played as a forward.

== Career ==
=== Club ===
He is a trainee of Twente Enschede. In the summer 2010, he joined Polish club Arka Gdynia on a two-year contract deal. He was released from Arka one year later.
