= Leonida Nikolai Giovannelli =

Italian-born Manx writer (1906–1980s)

Baron Leonida Nikolai Giovannelli
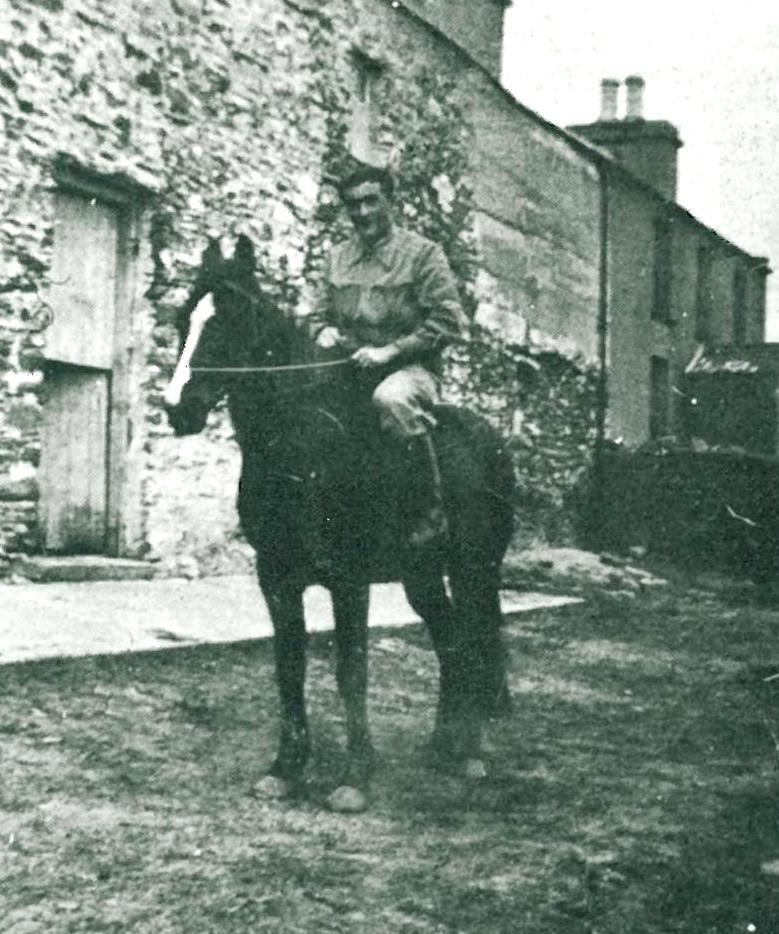
- Leonida Nikolai Giovannelli, as he appeared on the dust jacket of his 1971 book, Exile on an Island
- Born: Leonida Nikolai Giovannelli

Baron Leonida Nikolai Giovannelli was an Italian-born Manx writer and cultural activist, who published actively between the 1950s and 1980s.

Giovannelli was born in 1906 and was brought up on his family's estate in Abruzzo, Italy, before taking up a role in the Royal Italian Navy and then the Italian Embassy in London. He married an English woman, but upon the beginning of World War II, he was interned as an enemy alien in Palace Camp and then Metropole Camp in Douglas on the Isle of Man. Despite a daring escape to visit his wife in her hotel room when she visited the island, he was captured and returned to the camp, only to have his wife divorce him not long after. Whilst in internment, he joined a work party that was employed at Ballaragh, near Laxey. It was here that he met the Manx folklorist, musicologist, poet, and author, Mona Douglas, with whom he would form a close lifelong relationship.

Following his release, Giovannelli joined Mona Douglas at Clarum, where they made an ultimately unsuccessful attempt to run an upland farm. The experiment lasted for six years, ending in 1949 when the farm was sold to meet increasing debts. From this experience came a number of books, including Experiments on a Manx Hill Farm (1956) which was awarded a gold medal by the Italian Academy of Science, and Exile on an Island (1969) which was awarded the Gold Medal by the International Academy of Pontzen.

In great part due to the influence of Mona Douglas, Giovannelli developed a keen interest in Manx folklore and history, topics on which he published a number of books and lectured in a number of countries. He was a member of the International Folk Music Council, a regular broadcaster for Manx Radio and a contributor to the Manx press. He became naturalised in the Isle of Man in June 1968.

Giovannelli's other books included a series entitled The Manx Experience (1969 to 1973), The Black Sheep (1971) which was awarded the Collar of Antares of the USA, and The Paper Hero (1971) which was awarded the Gold Medal of the Academy of San Marco, Rome. He wrote a historical novel on the Garibaldi uprising, entitled Who Loves this Land. His collections of poetry include Reminiscent Thoughts, Bizarre Thoughts and A Fleet of Thoughts. His poetry was also published in numerous other publications, including a poem recollecting his World War II internment which appeared in Manninagh edited by Mona Douglas in 1971:

Sometimes, when we go swimming,
We have the illusion of freedom for an hour.
The guards relax, they know we cannot swim far,
And we, too, relax, lazily floating
Or swimming out towards the horizon,
Away from the wired enclosures on the shore,
Facing the open sea,
Feeling the free, salt wind, the caress of the sun on our bodies...

Giovannelli died in the 1980s.

== Publications ==
- Some Experiments in Modern Technique for the Hill Farmer (1955)
- Experiments on a Manx Hill Farm (1956)
- The Manx Influence, series I (1969)
- The Manx Influence, series II (1970)
- Exile on an Island (1971)
- The Black Sheep (1971)
- Paper Hero (1971)
- The Manx Influence, series III (1973)
