= Raffaelle Giovannetti =

Italian painter (1822–1911)

Raffaelle Giovannetti (1822–1911) was an Italian painter, known mainly for his Neoclassical depictions of historic and sacred subjects in large canvases.

== Biography ==
He was born in Lucca. He trained under Stefano Tofanelli, then after the latter's death, along with Michele Ridolfi went to study in Rome with Cammuccini. Giovannetti painted for the Vatican Museum, a lunette depicting Pius VII exhibiting the tapestries of Raphael. Giovannetti painted the Portrait of Carlo Lodovico of Bourbon (1823) in the Ducal Palace of Lucca.

In 1845, Professor Giovannetti was named Inspector of the Objects of Fine Arts of the Duchy of Lucca.
