= Jeanne M. Giovannoni =

Jeanne M. Giovannoni (1931–2009) was an author, professor, and associate vice chancellor at the University of California, Los Angeles School of Social Welfare. Her research (and subsequent book, written with Rosina Bercerra) focused on child abuse and how community members, social workers, and law enforcement respond.

== Biography ==
Giovannoni was born in San Francisco on October 31, 1931. Her undergraduate education was at UC Berkeley School of Social Welfare, earning a bachelor's of social work in 1953 and her Master of Social Work at the same school in 1955. Her doctorate was in 1966 from Brandeis University.

Before starting to teach at UCLA in 1969, she taught for three years at the UC Berkeley School of Social Welfare. She retired from UCLA in 1993.

She died at UCLA Medical Center, Santa Monica on December 17, 2009, of lung cancer.

== Publications ==
=== Books ===
- Giovannoni, Jeanne M.; Becerra, Rosina M. (1979). Defining Child Abuse. Free Press. ISBN 978-0-02-911750-7.
- Billingsley, Andrew; Giovannoni, Jeanne M. (1972). Children of the Storm: Black Children and American Child Welfare. Harcourt, Brace, Jovanovich. ISBN 978-0-15-117340-2.
- Giovannoni, Jeanne M.; Conklin, Jonathon; Iiyama, Patti (1978). Child Abuse and Neglect: An Examination from the Perspective of Child Development Knowledge. R&E Research Associates. ISBN 978-0-88247-514-1.

== Articles ==
- Giovannoni, Jeanne M.; Billingsley, Andrew (1970). "Child Neglect Among the Poor: A Study of Parental Adequacy In Families of Three Ethnic Groups". Child Welfare. 49 (4): 196–204. JSTOR 45392531.
- Giovannoni, Jeanne M. (1971). "Parental Mistreatment: Perpetrators and Victims". Journal of Marriage and Family. 33 (4): 649–657. doi:10.2307/349437. JSTOR 349437.
- Groeneveld, L. P.; Giovannoni, J. M. (June 1977). "Disposition of child abuse and neglect cases". Social Work Research and Abstracts. 13 (2): 24–30. doi:10.1093/swra/13.2.24.
- Ullmann, Leonard P.; Giovannoni, Jeanne M. (January 1964). "The development of a self-report measure of the process-reactive continuum". The Journal of Nervous and Mental Disease. 138 (1): 38–42. doi:10.1097/00005053-196401000-00005. PMID 14106322.
- Giovannoni, Jeanne M. (August 1967). "Socially Disruptive Behavior of Ex-Mental Patients". Archives of General Psychiatry. 17 (2): 146–153. doi:10.1001/archpsyc.1967.01730260018003. PMID 4952170.
- Giovannoni, Jeanne M. (January 1995). "Reports of child maltreatment from mandated and non-mandated reporters". Children and Youth Services Review. 17 (4): 487–501. doi:10.1016/0190-7409(95)00035-B.
- Lewis, M. A.; Giovannoni, J. M.; Leake, B. (June 1997). "Two-year placement outcomes of children removed at birth from drug-using and non-drug-using mothers in Los Angeles". Social Work Research. 21 (2): 81–90. doi:10.1093/swr/21.2.81.
- Giovannoni, Jeanne M. (12 September 1991). "Unsubstantiated Reports: Perspectives of Child Protective Workers". Child & Youth Services. 15 (2): 51–62. doi:10.1300/J024v15n02_03.

=== Book Reviews ===
- Giovannoni, Jeanne (January 1991). "Review of For Reasons of Poverty". Children and Youth Services Review. 13 (3): 223–229. doi:10.1016/0190-7409(91)90007-5.
