= Giovannini =

Giovannini is an Italian surname, derived from the given name Giovanni. Notable people with the surname include:

- Giovannini (composer) (fl. 1740 – c. 1782), Italian composer and violinist, first name unknown
- Alberto Giovannini (1955–2019), Italian macroeconomist and financial economist
- Andrea Giovannini (born 1993), Italian speed skater
- Attilio Giovannini (1924–2005), Italian footballer
- Caesar Giovannini (1925–2017), American pianist, band arranger and composer
- Carlo Cesare Giovannini (1695–1758), Italian Baroque painter
- Carlotta Giovannini (born 1990), Italian artistic gymnast
- Enrico Giovannini (born 1957), Italian economist and statistician
- Gianluca Giovannini (born 1983), Italian footballer
- Guglielmo Giovannini (1925–1990), Italian footballer
- Pietro Giovannini (1744–1811), Italian clergyman
- Romeo Giovannini (born 2001), Italian footballer
