= Gia Abrassart =

Belgian journalist and activist

Gia Abrassart is a journalist and activist based in Belgium. She is a member of the Belgo-Congolese diaspora and has supported the decolonization of public space, the 2020 George Floyd protests in Belgium, and the movement to achieve justice for the atrocities in the Congo Free State by Leopold II.

== Biography ==
Abrassart began her career in hospitality, before working for the International Committee of the Red Cross. She then returned to university to study journalism at the Université libre de Bruxelles.

In 2012, she was a co-founder of the Warrior Poets collective. In 2015, she co-wrote the Créer en postcolonie 2010-2015. Voix et dissidences belgo-congolaises book with Sarah Demart. That year, she also launched a lemon-and-ginger brand of drinks called Ginger G. In 2018, she founded the Café Congo in the Studio CityGate, in Anderlecht, as a cultural space.

Abrassart has supported and covered many social movements based in Belgium.
