= Gianna Persaki =

Gianna Persaki (Greek: Γιάννα Περσάκη; French: Jeanne Persaki; 5 June 1921 – 20 January 2008) was a Greek artist, pioneer abstract painter and committed modernist. She was focused on the geometric structure of pictorial space and the thorough analysis of colour relationships.

== Early years ==
From the age of 8, Persaki started working with the painter Eleftheria Sathopoulou, Fani Galanos and Dimitris Davis. At that time, her parents, whom she described as very noble and cultivated, requested that she learn mathematics and grammar at home. She then began lessons at her home address in Stournari Street in Athens but soon her teacher Lela realised that Persakis love and passion was in arts and painting. "My parents were thinking that I'm having grammar lessons, while I was actually learning how to paint by using a model that my teacher was bringing for me at home".

== Her work ==
She continued her studies in Paris in 1946–1955 first with her teacher Fernand Léger at his atelier and later at École des Beaux Arts under a scholarship granted by the French government. Whilst, she was taking lessons with André Lhote and Jean Souverbie, as well drawing at the Academy Grande Chaumière. Persaki had participated in several group exhibitions since 1945 but her first sole exhibition took place in Athens at 1955. Her works (paintings and ceramics) were exhibited since then in various exhibitions in Greece and Internationally. Since 1957 until 1982, she was a director of the Atelier of Χ.Ε.Ν in Athens and her paintings and ceramics decorate central buildings of Athens such as in 5 Mavromateon street and 11 Amerikis Street.

Her work is abstract, focused on geometrical shapes using very fresh clear colours with a discreet touch of cubism. Two characteristic paintings of hers may be seen at the Panayotis D. Cangelaris online display of his collection of contemporary Greek paintings.

== Personal life ==
She married the sculptor Costas Coulentianos in 1944 and got a divorce a year after her husband moved to Paris in 1947. Her life companion since 1955 was the Poet Miltos Sachtouri's but they never got married. Her daughter is the painter Eva Persaki.

== Her death ==
Persaki died in Athens at 2008 at the age of 87 and was buried at the First (A) Cemetery of Athens three years after her partner's Miltos Sachtouris death, leaving behind her daughter Eva Persaki and her granddaughters.

== Sources ==
- H. Mortoglou - " Artistically uncompromised"
- Olga Sella "The Silence of the wind of Miltos Sachtouris
