= Giovanna Granieri =

Italian basketball player (born 1974)

Giovanna Granieri Fiorini (born 15 November 1974 in Todi) is an Italian former basketball player.
