= Giovanni di Giovanni =

Florentine persecution victim (1350–1365)

Giovanni di Giovanni (c. 1350 – 7 May 1365?) was one of the youngest victims of the campaign against sodomy waged in 14th-century Florence. The prosecution came on the heels of the Black Death, the bubonic plague epidemic which had ravaged the city two years earlier. Some of the most influential people of the religious establishment blamed sodomites for having brought the wrath of God down on the heads of the populace. The "remedy" they promoted was to purify the city of evil by means of fire, leading to burnings at the stake and other punishments (red-hot iron) such as that suffered by Giovanni di Giovanni.

Di Giovanni was labelled "a public and notorious passive sodomite" and convicted by the Podestà court of being the passive partner of a number of different men. His punishment was to be paraded on the back of a donkey, then to be publicly castrated. Finally, he was to have his anus burned with a red-hot iron (or, as the sentence read: "[punished] in that part of the body where he allowed himself to be known in sodomitical practice"); it is presumed he did not survive the ordeal.

== See also ==
- History of Christianity and homosexuality
- History of human sexuality
- List of people executed for homosexuality
- Violence against LGBT people
