= Louis A. DeSimone =

American prelate

His Excellency, The Most Reverend Louis Anthony DeSimone
- Auxiliary Bishop Emeritus of Philadelphia; Titular Bishop of Cillium
- Archdiocese: Philadelphia
- Appointed: June 27, 1981
- Installed: August 12, 1981
- Term ended: April 5, 1997
- Other post: Titular Bishop of Cillium

Orders
- Ordination: May 10, 1952
- Consecration: August 12, 1981 by John Krol, John Joseph Graham, and Martin Nicholas Lohmuller

Personal details
- Born: February 21, 1922 Philadelphia, Pennsylvania, U.S.
- Died: October 5, 2018 (aged 96) Villanova, Pennsylvania, U.S.

Styles of Louis Anthony DeSimone
- Reference style: His Excellency; The Most Reverend
- Spoken style: Your Excellency
- Religious style: Bishop

Louis Anthony DeSimone (February 21, 1922 – October 5, 2018) was an American prelate of the Roman Catholic Church. He served as an auxiliary bishop of Philadelphia from 1981 to 1997.

== Biography ==
DeSimone was born in Philadelphia, Pennsylvania and raised in Bridgeport. He has two brothers, Russell and Salvatore, both of whom also chose ecclesiastical careers; the former is an Augustinian professor at the Pontifical Lateran University and the latter (d. 1989) was a pastor in New Jersey. He attended Bridgeport High School and Villanova University before becoming a sergeant in the Army during World War II, serving for two years in Italy with the Fifth Army Headquarters. Upon his return to the United States, DeSimone entered St. Charles Borromeo Seminary in Wynnewood, and was ordained to the priesthood on May 10, 1952.

He then taught at St. Thomas More High School in Philadelphia, as well as serving as assistant pastor at St. Donato Parish in Philadelphia and at Ss. Cosmas and Damian Parish in Conshohocken. He became a member of the archdiocesan Executive Committee of the Catholic Charities Appeal in 1961, pastor of Ss. Cosmas and Damian Parish in 1968, and director of Catholic Relief Services in 1971. In 1975, DeSimone was made chairman of the Heritage Group Committee for the forty-first International Eucharistic Congress, which was held in Philadelphia in August 1976. He was raised to the rank of Honorary Prelate of His Holiness during that same year. John Cardinal Krol later named him coordinator of the Italian Earthquake Relief Fund for Friuli, his work for which earned him the Commendatore al Merito della Repubblica Italiana from the Italian government.

He became pastor of St. Monica Church in Philadelphia in November 1976, and consultor to the Council of Managers of the Archdiocesan Office for Development in 1979. He also sat on the board of directors of Pennsylvania Hospital and of Methodist Hospital for several years, and was Vice-President of the United Way of Southeastern Pennsylvania.

On June 27, 1981, DeSimone was appointed Auxiliary Bishop of Philadelphia and Titular Bishop of Cillium by Pope John Paul II. He received his episcopal consecration on the following August 12 from Cardinal Krol, with Bishops John Graham and Martin Nicholas Lohmuller serving as co-consecrators, in the Cathedral-Basilica of Sts. Peter and Paul.

In addition to his duties as an auxiliary, De Simone was named vicar general of the Archdiocese and later chairman of the Catholic Charities Appeal in 1982. He resigned his post on April 5, 1997, after fifteen years of service and reaching the mandatory retirement age of 75. On October 5, 2018, he died at the age of 96 at St. Thomas Monastery in Villanova, Pennsylvania.

== See also ==
- Catholic Church hierarchy
- Catholic Church in the United States
- Historical list of the Catholic bishops of the United States
- List of Catholic bishops of the United States
- Lists of patriarchs, archbishops, and bishops

== Episcopal succession ==
Catholic Church titles
Preceded by –	Auxiliary Bishop of Philadelphia; 1981–1997	Succeeded by –
