= Argyropolis =

Argyropolis or Argyroupolis (Greek: Αργυρούπολις, "silver town") can refer to:

- Argyropolis (Thrace), a town of ancient Thrace, now in Turkey
- Gümüşhane in the Pontus (northeastern Turkey)
- Argyroupoli, a southern suburb of Athens, Greece, founded by refugees from Gümüşhane
- Argyroupoli, Rethymno, a village in the Rethymno regional unit, Crete
- Argirópolis, a city proposal by Argentinian statesman Domingo F. Sarmiento to be the capital of the Confederate States del Plata (Argentina, Paraguay and Uruguay)
