= Adrian and Natalia of Nicomedia =

Roman Christian martyrs (died 306)

Saints Adrian and Natalia of Nicomedia
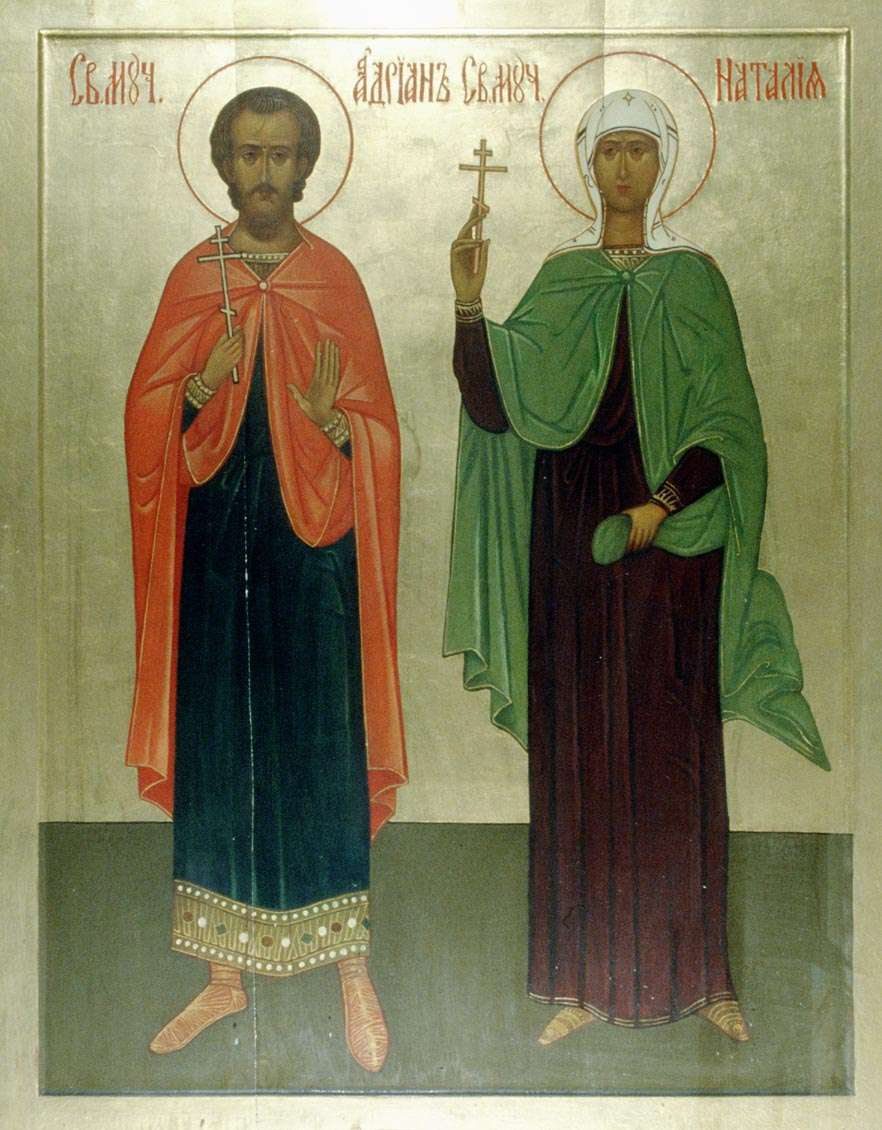
- Saint Adrian and his wife, Saint Natalia

Martyrs
- Died: 4 March 306; Nicomedia (modern-day İzmit, Turkey)
- Venerated in: Roman Catholic Church; Coptic Orthodox Church; Eastern Orthodox Church
- Major shrine: Argyropolis (Thrace) near Constantinople; Geraardsbergen, Belgium; Church of Sant'Adriano al Foro, Rome
- Feast: 8 September; 1 December
- Attributes: depicted armed, with an anvil in his hands or at his feet
- Patronage: martyrdom, guards, eating disorders, peacekeeping missions

Adrian of Nicomedia (also known as Hadrian) or Saint Adrian (Greek: Ἁδριανὸς Νικομηδείας, romanized: Adrianos Nikomēdeias, died 4 March 306) was a Herculian Guard of the Roman Emperor Galerius. After becoming a convert to Christianity with his wife Natalia (Ναταλία), Adrian was martyred at Nicomedia in Asia-Minor (Turkey). Adrian was the chief military saint of Northern Europe for many ages, second only to Saint George, and is much revered in Flanders, Germany and the north of France.

== Martyrdom ==
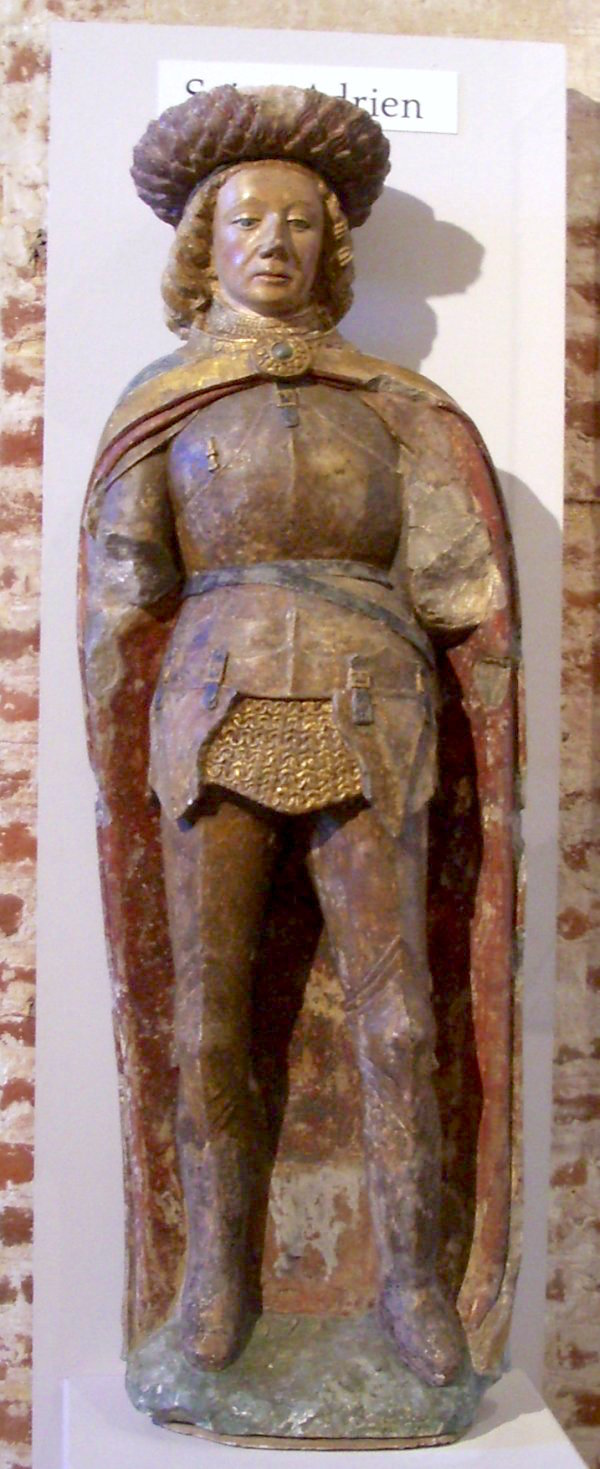
French statue of Saint Adrian

Adrian and Natalia lived in Nicomedia during the time of Emperor Maximian in the early fourth century. The twenty-eight-year-old Adrian was head of the praetorium.

It is said that while presiding over the torture of a band of Christians, he asked them what reward they expected to receive from God. They replied, "Eye hath not seen, nor ear heard, neither has entered into the heart of man, the things which God hath prepared for them that love him." He was so amazed at their courage that he publicly confessed his faith, though he had not yet been baptized. He was then immediately imprisoned. He was forbidden visitors, but accounts state that his wife Natalia came to visit him, dressed as a boy, to ask for his prayers when he entered Heaven, and she was reportedly present at his execution.

Adrian was brought before Emperor Galerius, who demanded he renounce his new faith. Adrian refused and proclaimed his faith in Christ to the emperor, who ordered Adrian thrown in an arena with a lion, with the animal allegedly refusing to attack him. Enraged by this, his captors gruesomely tortured Adrian before executing him along with 23 other Christians. Adrian's captors beat him with staves, then threw him to the ground and beat his abdomen so severely it disemboweled him, exposing his intestines, which has been depicted in statutes and artwork of Adrian. After this he was dismembered by having his hands and feet cut off on an anvil before finally being beheaded.

After his execution, the executioners wanted to burn the bodies of the dead, but a storm arose and quenched the fire. Natalia recovered one of Adrian's hands.

== Historicity ==
The accuracy of the recorded story has been questioned. A second Hadrian is said to have been a son of the Emperor Probus, and, having embraced Christianity, to have been put to death (A.D. 320), at Nicomedia in Asia Minor, by Emperor Licinius. But no reliable information concerning him is extant. He is commemorated on August 26.

== Feast day and patronage ==
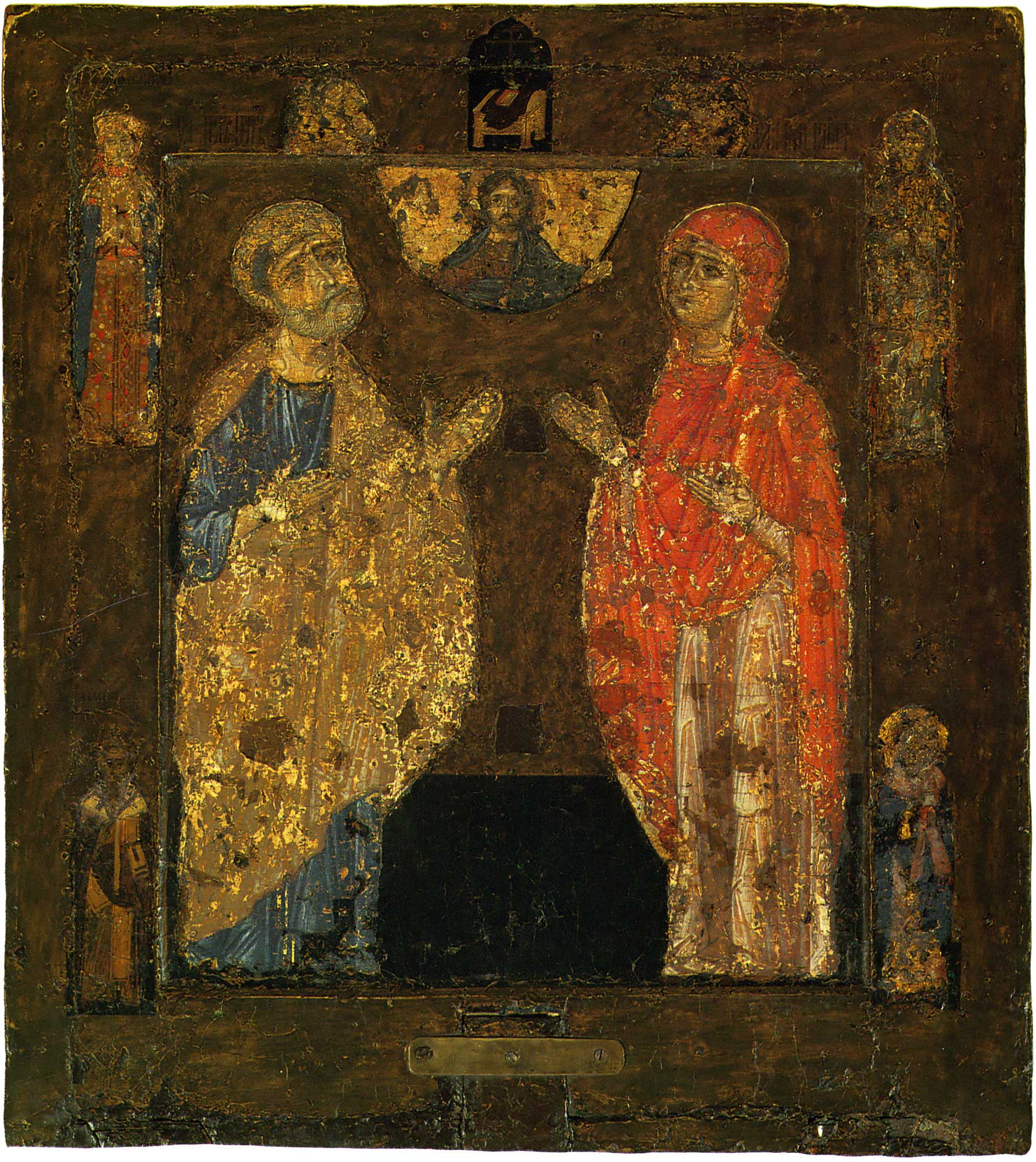
11th-century Russian Orthodox icon of the martyrs Adrian and Natalia.

In the Eastern Orthodox Church, Saint Adrian shares a feast day with his wife on 26 August in the Church Calendar, which for the majority of Orthodox Christians remains on the Julian Calendar, is on 8 September in the Gregorian and global civil calendars; he also has feast days alone on 4 March. In the Roman Catholic Church, he is venerated alone, without his wife, on September 8. The Coptic Orthodox Church likewise venerates St. Adrian and his companions on the third day of the Coptic month known as Nesi (corresponding to September 8), mentioning his wife's role during the Synaxarion reading of that day.

Saint Hadrian was the chief military saint of Northern Europe for many ages, second only to Saint George, and is much revered in Flanders, Germany and the north of France. He is usually represented armed, with an anvil in his hands or at his feet.

Sant'Adriano al Foro, a church in the Roman Forum (founded AD 630), was named in his honour. The name was later transferred to Santa Maria della Mercede e Sant'Adriano a Villa Albani (1958) when the old church was demolished.

== See also ==
- Saint Adrian or Hadrian of Nicomedia, patron saint archive
