= Victoria Donohoe =

American artist and historian (1929–2018)

- Born: March 21, 1929
- Died: November 21, 2018
- Education: Rosemont College, University of Pennsylvania
- Occupations: Art critic, historian
- Employers: The Catholic Standard & Times; The Philadelphia Inquirer

Victoria Donohoe (March 21, 1929 – November 21, 2018) was an American artist, art critic and historian who wrote for papers such as The Catholic Standard & Times and The Philadelphia Inquirer. She has been described by editor Gabriel Escobar of the Inquirer as "indomitable" and having "an aura of legend". She did not drive a car or own a television, preferring to travel by public transit and avoid the use of telephones, answering machines, and computers. Throughout her career, she would file her columns in person at the Inquirer suburban newsroom in Conshohocken, typing them from her handwritten notes. She published over 1,000 articles in the Inquirer over 50 years between 1962 and 2012.

== Early life and education ==
Victoria Donohoe was born March 21, 1929. She lived at her parents' home in Narberth, Pennsylvania for much of her life. Her father Daniel J. Donohoe was an artist and illustrator who worked for the Evening Bulletin. Her mother, Ann (O'Neill) Donohoe, taught art classes at Moore College of Art and Design.

Victoria attended high school at Mater Misericordiae Academy (now Merion Mercy Academy), a Catholic college preparatory school for girls in Merion, Pennsylvania, in the Archdiocese of Philadelphia. She received her bachelor’s degree from Rosemont College in 1950, as well as a teaching certificate. She taught art at Rosemont while earning her Masters of Fine Arts from the University of Pennsylvania. She then went to Florence, Italy, where she attended Pope Pius XII Institute-Graduate School of Fine Arts for Women at Villa Schifanoia in 1953.

== Career ==
Donohoe wrote over 1,000 articles about art and architecture for the Philadelphia Inquirer over a fifty-year period from 1962-2012. Described as "grace personified", she wrote both perceptively and frankly about the artists, works and events she reviewed, but phrased her criticisms gently. "Her insightful but honest interpretations of their work earned her respect throughout the art world."

She was active in community events such as Narberth Borough Council meetings, and served on the Committee of Sacred Liturgy of the Philadelphia Catholic Archdiocese. In addition to the Inquirer, she wrote for The Catholic Standard & Times.

Donohoe was active in local historical preservation activities, resulting in the creation of historical markers by the Pennsylvania Historic and Museum Commission in honor of NFL commissioner Bert Bell (1998) and John Dickinson, who drafted the Articles of Confederation (2001). In 2003, Donohoe helped to obtain registration for Narbrook Park Historic District in the U.S. National Register of Historic Places. She was a co-author of Narbrook Park: A Garden City Experiment (2015).

Victoria Donohoe died of pneumonia on November 21, 2018. In her will, she left both a financial gift and a manuscript about local Narberth History to the Lower Merion Historical Society. The Society is preparing her manuscript for publication.

== Awards and honors ==
- 1985, honorary doctorate in fine arts, Villanova University
- 2013, Artists Equity Award, Philadelphia Tri-State Artists Equity Association

== Archival collections ==
- "Victoria Donohoe Collection". Stuart Weitzman School of Design, University of Pennsylvania.
- Victoria Donohoe Papers, Rosemont College Archives
- Victoria Donohoe Family History Collection, Historical Society of Pennsylvania
