= Albert Vanhoye =

French cardinal and biblical scholar (1923–2021)

His Eminence Albert Vanhoye SJ
- Cardinal Priest of Santa Maria della Mercede e Sant'Adriano a Villa Albani
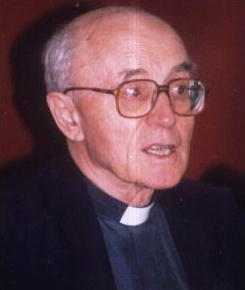
- Vanhoye in June 2005
- Church: Catholic Church
- Appointed: 20 June 2016
- Term ended: 29 July 2021
- Predecessor: John Joseph Krol
- Other post: Ecclesiastical Counsellor to the House of Bourbon-Two Sicilies (2010–2021)
- Previous posts: Rector of the Pontifical Biblical Institute (1984–1990); Secretary of the Pontifical Biblical Commission (1990–2001); Cardinal Deacon of Santa Maria della Mercede e Sant'Adriano a Villa Albani (2006–2016)

Orders
- Ordination: 25 July 1954 by Henri-Charles Dupont
- Created cardinal: 24 March 2006 by Pope Benedict XVI
- Rank: Cardinal deacon (2006–2016); Cardinal priest (2016–2021)

Personal details
- Born: 24 July 1923 Hazebrouck, French Flanders, France
- Died: 29 July 2021 (aged 98) Rome, Italy
- Denomination: Catholic
- Education: Pontifical Biblical Institute
- Motto: Cordi tuo unitus sjedinjen sa svojim srcem!
- Coat of arms

Albert Vanhoye SJ ([al.bɛʁ van.wa]; 24 July 1923 – 29 July 2021) was a French priest, a member of the Society of Jesus, and a biblical scholar. He taught at the Pontifical Biblical Institute from 1963 to 1998 and served as its rector from 1984 to 1990. He was Secretary of the Pontifical Biblical Commission from 1990 to 2001. He was made a cardinal by Pope Benedict XVI in 2006 and led the Lenten retreat for the Roman Curia in 2008.

== Formation and studies ==
Vanhoye was born on 24 July 1923 at Hazebrouck, French Flanders. During World War II in occupied France, Vanhoye was made to work in a factory producing gunpowder for the German war effort. To avoid being sent to work in Nazi Germany, he secretly traveled on foot across the entire width of France to reach the unoccupied zone. Vanhoye entered the Society of Jesus on 11 September 1941 in Le Vignau, Landes, and took his first vows on 15 November 1944. He studied at Jesuit Scholasticates in France and Belgium. He obtained a licentiate in classical literature at the Sorbonne and another in theology from the University of Enghien. He received a Doctorate in Sacred Scripture with a thesis on the literary structure of the Letter to the Hebrews from the Pontifical Biblical Institute (the Biblicum) in Rome in 1961. He was ordained a priest of the Society of Jesus on 25 July 1954 in Enghien, Belgium. He took his final vows as a Jesuit on 2 February 1959.

== Teaching and research ==
After teaching for three years at the Jesuit study house of Chantilly, he became Professor of Scripture at the Pontifical Biblical Institute in 1963; he was dean of the faculty from 1969 to 1975 and served as its rector from 1984 to 1990. He retired in 1998. His research and teaching dealt with the New Testament Letters, in particular the Letter to the Hebrews. During his years at the Biblicum he directed 29 theses.

He was a member of the commission that prepared the apostolic constitution Sapientia Christiana on ecclesiastical universities and faculties, which Pope John Paul II issued in 1979. He was a consultor of several dicasteries of the Roman Curia: the Pontifical Council for Promoting Christian Unity from 1980 to 1996, the Congregation for Catholic Education beginning in 1976, and the Congregation for the Doctrine of the Faith beginning in 1990.

He was Secretary of the Pontifical Biblical Commission from 1990 to 2001, under its president Cardinal Joseph Ratzinger, later Pope Benedict XVI. In that post, Vanhoye played an important role in two important studies that, in the words of a Jesuit appraisal, "extended the work of the [Second Vatican] Council": L'Interprétation de la Bible dans l'Église (1993) and Le Peuple juif et ses saintes Écritures dans la Bible chrétienne (2001). He retired from teaching when he turned 75 in 1998.

== Cardinal ==
Styles of Albert Vanhoye, SJ
- Reference style: His Eminence
- Spoken style: Your Eminence
- Religious style: Cardinal
- Informal style: Cardinal

He was made Cardinal-Deacon of Santa Maria della Mercede e Sant'Adriano a Villa Albani by Pope Benedict XVI at the consistory of 24 March 2006. Having obtained a dispensation, he was not consecrated a bishop. In November of that year, Pope Benedict chose him as one of two prelates charged with presenting his second encyclical Spe Salvi at a press conference held upon its release.

He led the 2008 Lenten Retreat for the Curia. At the synod of bishops held in October of that year, which considered the significance of scripture, Vanhoye was tasked with responding to an address by Rabbi Shear Yashuv Cohen of Haifa on Jewish interpretation of scripture. In his remarks, published in L'Osservatore Romano later in the month, he considered "how the Christian Bible refers to the Hebrew Bible and how it speaks of the Jewish people". He drew on the work produced at the end of his tenure at the Biblical Commission and published in November 2001 as The Jewish People and the Holy Scriptures in the Christian Bible.

He served as Grand Prior of the Sacred Military Constantinian Order of Saint George from 2008 until his appointment by Prince Carlo, Duke of Castro, in November 2010 as Ecclesiastical Counsellor to the Royal House of Bourbon Two Sicilies.

After the death of Cardinal Roger Etchegaray on 4 September 2019, Vanhoye was the oldest living member of the College of Cardinals. He died in Rome on 29 July 2021, five days after his 98th birthday.

== Selected works ==
- La structure littéraire de l'Epître aux Hébreux (in French). Tournai: Desclée de Brouwer. 1963. (MMS ID 9910575974401631)
- Situation du Christ. Epître aux hébreux 1 et 2 (in French). Paris. 1969. (MMS ID 992940274401631)
- Prêtres anciens, prêtre nouveau selon le Nouveau Testament (in French). Paris. 1980. (OCLC No 896871547)
- La lettre aux Hébreux: Jésus-Christ, médiateur d'une nouvelle alliance (in French). Paris. 2002. ISBN 978-2-7189-0963-9
- The Letter to the Hebrews: A New Commentary. New York: Paulist. 2015. ISBN 978-0-8091-4928-5
- Moore, Nicholas J.; Ounsworth, Richard J., eds. (2018). A Perfect Priest: Studies in the Letter to the Hebrews. Tübingen: Mohr Siebeck. ISBN 978-3-1615-4289-3
- L'Apôtre Paul: personnalité, style et conception du ministère (in French). Leuven University Press. 1986. ISBN 978-9-0618-6209-3
- La passion selon les quartre évangiles (in French). Paris: Editions du Cerf. 1981. ISBN 978-0-2204-0183-2

Catholic Church titles
Preceded by Maurice Gilbert	Rector of the Pontifical Biblical Institute; 1984–1990	Succeeded by Klemens Stock
Preceded by Henri Cazelles	Secretary of the Pontifical Biblical Commission; 1990–2001	Succeeded by Klemens Stock
Preceded by John Joseph Krol	Cardinal Deacon of Santa Maria della Mercede e Sant'Adriano a Villa Albani; 24 March 2006 – 20 June 2016	Succeeded by Himself as Cardinal Priest
Preceded by Himself as Cardinal Deacon	Cardinal Priest of Santa Maria della Mercede e Sant'Adriano a Villa Albani; 20 June 2016 – 29 July 2021	Succeeded by Fernando Vérgez Alzaga
Records
Preceded by Roger Etchegaray	Oldest living cardinal 4 September 2019 – 29 July 2021	Succeeded by Jozef Tomko
