= Santa Maria della Mercede e Sant'Adriano a Villa Albani =

Catholic titular church in Rome

- Church of Saint Maria of Mercies and Saint Adrian at Villa Albani
- Chiesa di Santa Maria della Mercede e Sant'Adriano
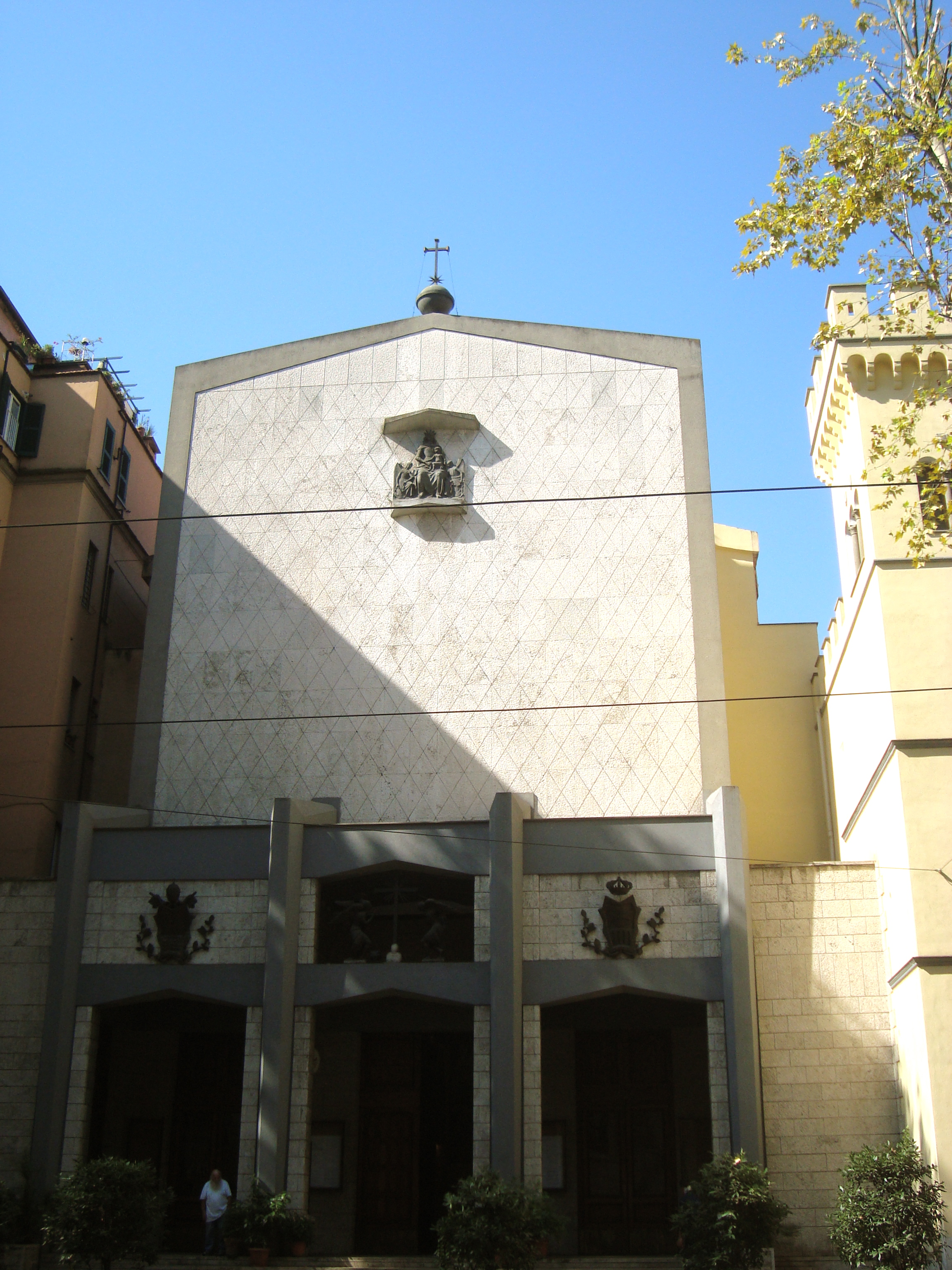
- Facade. The arms of Pope Pius XII and the Order of the Blessed Virgin Mary of Mercy are displayed either side of the entrance.

- Location within Rome
- 41°55′02″N 12°30′02″E
- Location: Via Basento 100, Q. Salario, Rome
- Country: Italy
- Language: Italian
- Denomination: Catholic
- Tradition: Roman Rite
- Religious order: Mercedarians
- Website: parrocchiadellamercede.it

History
- Status: titular church, parish church, General Curia of the Order of the Blessed Virgin Mary of Mercy
- Dedication: Mary of Mercies and Adrian of Nicomedia
- Consecrated: 1 March 1958

Architecture
- Functional status: active
- Architect: Marco Piloni
- Architectural type: Modern
- Completed: 1958

Administration
- Diocese: Rome

Santa Maria della Mercede e Sant'Adriano a Villa Albani ([ˈsanta maˈriːa ˈdɛlla merˈtʃeːde e santaˈdrjaːno a ˈvilla alˈbaːni]) is a 20th-century parochial church and titular church in north-central Rome, dedicated to Mary of Mercies and Adrian of Nicomedia. It is also the headquarters of the Order of the Blessed Virgin Mary of Mercy or Mercedarians.

== History ==
Santa Maria della Mercede e Sant'Adriano a Villa Albani was built in 1958. It is named for Mary of Mercies, as the parish is administered by the Order of the Blessed Virgin Mary of Mercy (Mercedarians). It is also named for Adrian of Nicomedia (d. AD 306) in honour of Sant'Adriano al Foro, a deconsecrated church in the Roman Forum; a holy water font and some altars were brought to the new church from Sant'Adriano.

On 7 June 1967, it was made a titular church to be held by a cardinal-deacon.

Cardinal-Protectors

- John Krol (1967–1996); cardinal-priest pro hac vice
- Albert Vanhoye (2006–2021); promoted to cardinal-priest pro hac vice in 2016
- Fernando Vérgez Alzaga (2022–present)

== Gallery ==
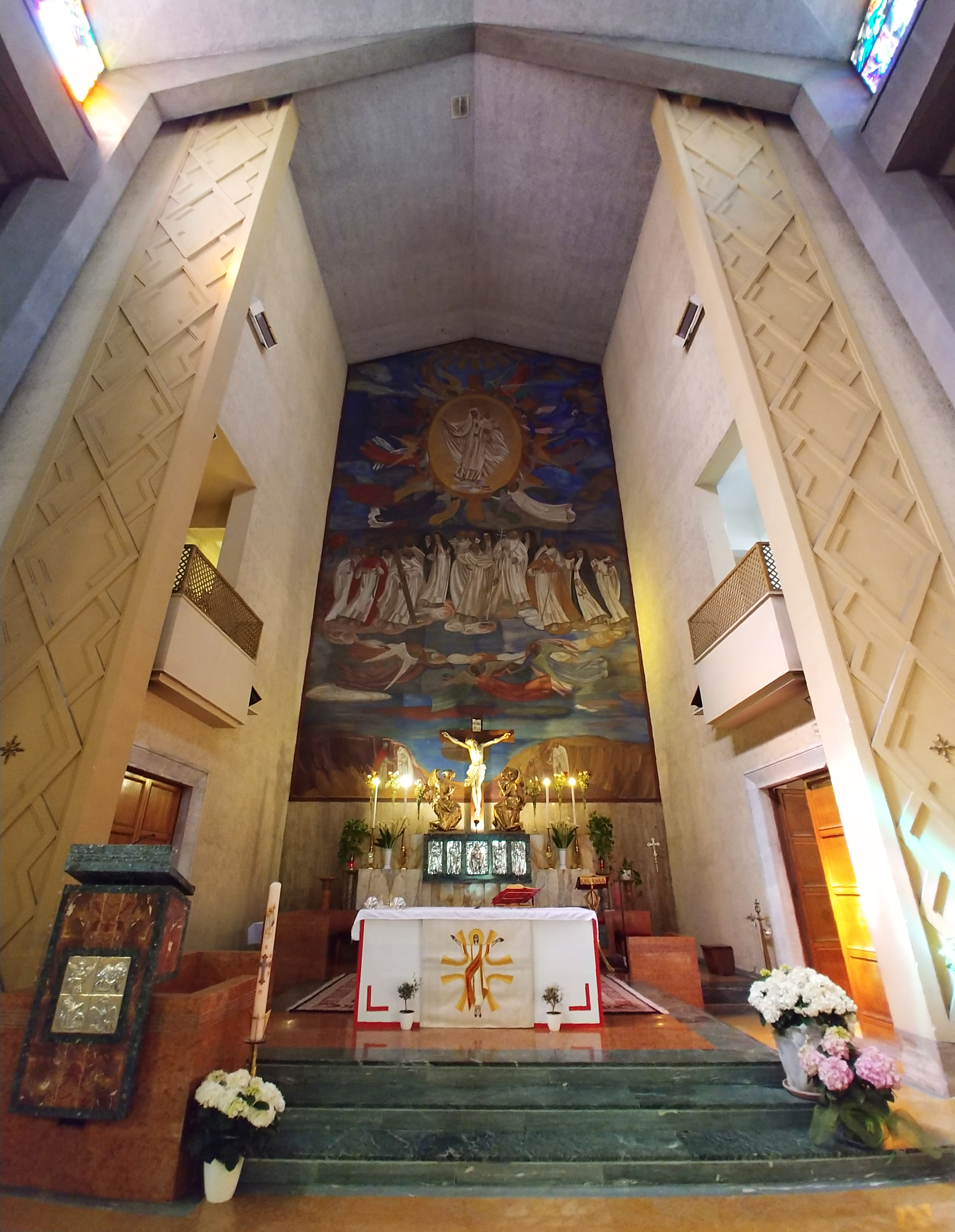
Apse

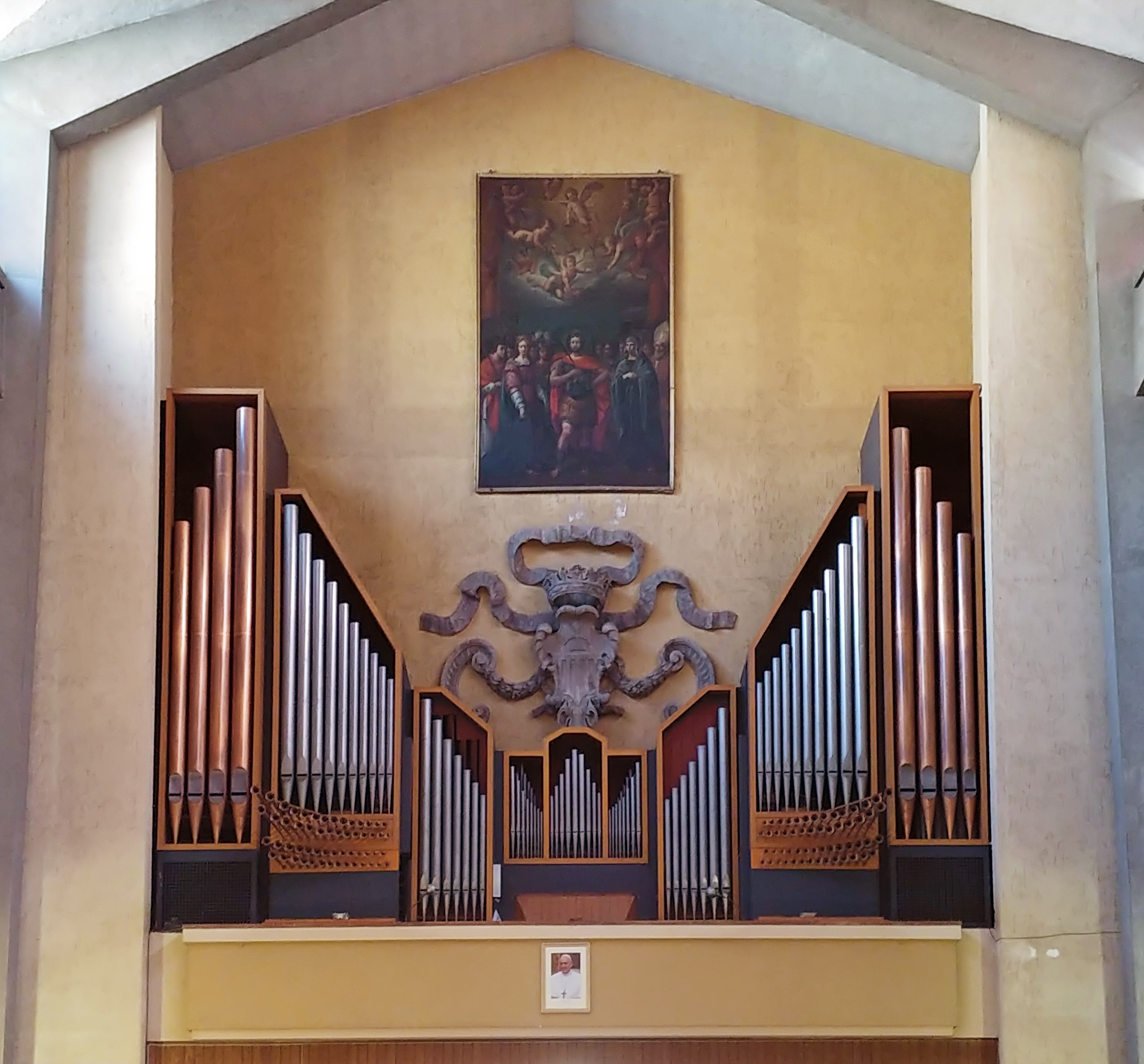
Pipe organ

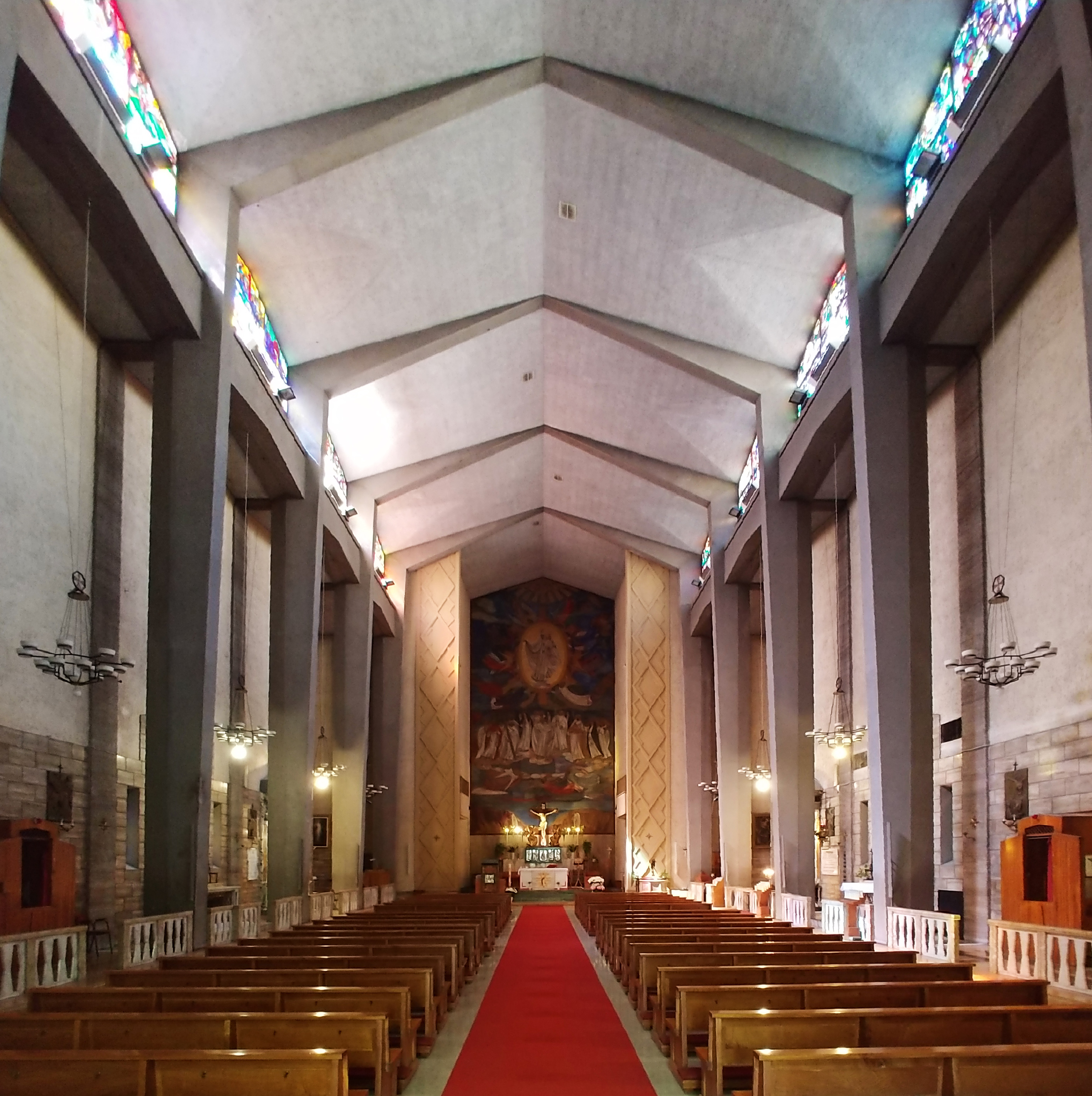
Interior view
