= John Patrick Foley =

American Roman Catholic archbishop and cardinal

His Eminence John Patrick Foley
- Grand Master of the Equestrian Order of the Holy Sepulchre of Jerusalem
- Appointed: December 22, 2007
- Term ended: February 12, 2011
- Predecessor: Carlo Furno
- Successor: Edwin Frederick O'Brien
- Other post: Cardinal-Deacon of San Sebastiano al Palatino
- Previous post: President of the Pontifical Council for Social Communications (1984–2007)

Orders
- Ordination: May 19, 1962 by John Krol
- Consecration: May 8, 1984 by John Krol
- Created cardinal: November 24, 2007 by Benedict XVI
- Rank: Cardinal-Deacon

Personal details
- Born: November 11, 1935 Darby, Pennsylvania, U.S.
- Died: December 11, 2011 (aged 76) Darby, Pennsylvania, U.S.
- Motto: Ad majorem Dei gloriam (For the greater glory of God)
- Coat of arms: John Patrick Foley's coat of arms

Styles of John Foley
- Reference style: His Eminence
- Spoken style: Your Eminence
- Religious style: Cardinal
- Informal style: Cardinal
- See: none

John Patrick Foley (November 11, 1935 – December 11, 2011) was an American Catholic prelate who served as Grand Master of the Equestrian Order of the Holy Sepulchre of Jerusalem from 2007 to 2011. He previously served as president of the Pontifical Council for Social Communications from 1984 to 2007. He was elevated to the cardinalate in 2007.

== Biography ==
=== Early life and education ===
An only child, Foley was born at Fitzgerald-Mercy Hospital in Darby, Pennsylvania, to John and Regina (née Vogt) Foley. He was raised in Sharon Hill, a suburb of Philadelphia, and was a member of Holy Spirit Parish. After graduating from the local parochial school, he attended St. Joseph's Preparatory School from 1949 to 1953, and briefly considered a Jesuit vocation. He later attended St. Joseph's College, where he was elected student-body president in 1956 and obtained a Bachelor's degree summa cum laude in history in 1957. He then studied at St. Charles Borromeo Seminary in Wynnewood, earning a Ph.B. in 1958.

Foley was ordained a priest of the Archdiocese of Philadelphia by Archbishop John Krol on May 19, 1962. Foley received his Ph.L. in 1964 from the Pontifical University of St. Thomas Aquinas and his Ph.D. cum laude in Philosophy from the same institution in 1965. The title of his dissertation was Natural Law, Natural Right and the Warren Court. He set a record by receiving his doctorate in philosophy from the university in one year. After returning to Philadelphia he went on to earn a master's degree in journalism from the Columbia University Graduate School of Journalism.

=== Early ministry ===
Foley taught English at Cardinal Dougherty High School, Philadelphia, from 1966 to 1967. He then served as assistant editor and Rome correspondent for the archdiocesan newspaper, The Catholic Standard & Times. From 1970 to 1984 he was the newspaper's editor, and in 1976 he received the honorific title of "monsignor."

=== Roman Curia ===
On April 5, 1984, Foley was appointed President of the Pontifical Council for Social Communications and Titular Archbishop of Neapolis in Proconsulari by Pope John Paul II. He received his episcopal consecration on the following May 8 from Cardinal Krol, with Bishops Martin Nicholas Lohmuller and Thomas Welsh serving as co-consecrators. As the council's president, he was the longest-serving head of a Curial dicastery until receiving this appointment; Archbishop Claudio Maria Celli, former Secretary of the Administration of the Patrimony of the Holy See, was appointed as his successor. In 1989, he published a document on Pornography and Violence in the Media.

John Patrick Foley managed the creation of the .va top-level domain in 1995.

Foley sat on various organizations, including the National Conference of Christians and Jews, Pennsylvania State Ethics Commission and National Conference of Catholic Bishops.

=== Cardinal ===
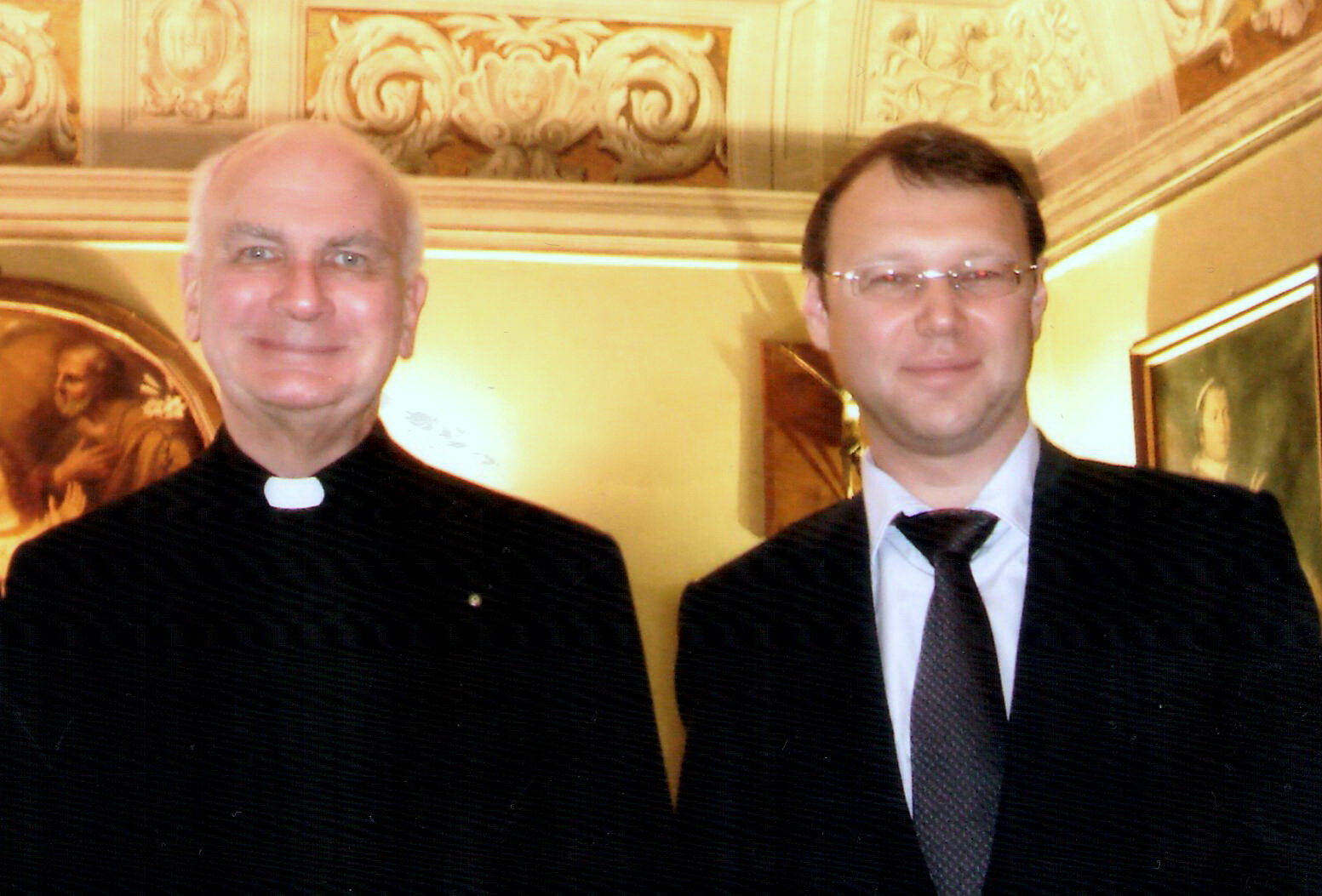
Foley with Yaroslav Ternovskiy

Pope Benedict XVI named him as Pro-Grand Master of the Order of the Holy Sepulchre on June 27, 2007.

Foley was elevated to the College of Cardinals in the consistory at St. Peter's Basilica on November 24, 2007. He was named the Cardinal-Deacon of San Sebastiano al Palatino. He is the seventh priest of the Archdiocese of Philadelphia to be elevated to the cardinalate. He became full Grand Master on December 22, 2007.

On June 12, 2008, in addition to his other duties he was appointed by Benedict as a member of the Congregation for Divine Worship and the Discipline of the Sacraments and the Congregation for the Evangelization of Peoples until he was weakened by illness.

He provided the commentary for the American television viewers of the Christmas Midnight Mass from St Peter's Basilica, Rome. However, in 2009, he retired from that role after 25 years. The commentary was taken over by Msgr Thomas Powers of the Diocese of Bridgeport, Connecticut, an official in the Vatican's Congregation for Bishops.

Pope Benedict XVI accepted Foley's resignation as grand master on February 24, 2011, due to age (on November 11, 2010, the cardinal had turned 75, the age at which all bishops must write a letter to the Pope formally offering to resign) and because of ill health (he was diagnosed in September 2009 with leukemia and anemia). He had led the Pontifical Council for Social Communications for 23 years, from 1984 to June 2007, when he was appointed grand master, and had been a consultor or member of many curial departments. He had met with Pope Benedict XVI on February 10, two days after submitting his resignation letter to the Vatican Secretary of State.

=== Later life ===
On February 12, 2011, he returned to the Archdiocese of Philadelphia, where he resided at Villa St. Joseph, Darby, Pennsylvania, a home for infirm, retired, or convalescent priests of the archdiocese, until his death on December 11, 2011, from leukemia.

The two days of funeral rites began on December 15 with the reception of the body at St Charles Borromeo Seminary, Overbrook, from which Foley was ordained just shy of a half-century earlier. The daylong viewing in St Martin's Chapel ended with Mass celebrated by the senior auxiliary of Philadelphia, Bishop Daniel Thomas, who was a close friend.

The funeral took place the next day in the Philadelphia Cathedral-Basilica where he had been ordained a priest and bishop and in whose crypt he was then buried. In keeping with preferences expressed by Cardinal Foley during his final weeks, Archbishop Edwin O'Brien, his successor as head of the Equestrian Order of the Holy Sepulchre, celebrated the liturgy. Cardinal Timothy M. Dolan, Archbishop of New York and USCCB president, was the homilist. Both presider and preacher were friends of the deceased cardinal since the times when they headed the Pontifical North American College in Rome.

== Views ==
During his tenure, the archbishop once sparked outrage in the homosexual community by describing the AIDS pandemic as a "natural sanction for certain types of activities."

He also defended his church's exclusively male priesthood, once saying, "Jesus clearly did not ordain women to the priesthood, nor did he authorize the Church to do so." Upon the death of John Paul II on April 2, 2005, Foley and all major Vatican officials, in accord with custom, automatically lost their positions during the sede vacante. He was confirmed as the council's president by Pope Benedict XVI several weeks later, on April 21.

== Personal life ==
Foley reportedly would rise every day at 6:00 am to watch CNN, in order to "know what to pray about." Foley was the English liaison for Pope John Paul II's 1979 visit to the United States. He was a teetotaler and self-described "chocoholic".

== Honors ==
- He was awarded honorary degrees by St. Joseph's University, Philadelphia (1985); the Allentown College of St. Francis de Sales (1990); The Catholic University of America, Washington (1996); Assumption College, Worcester (1997); Regis University, Denver (1998); John Cabot University, Rome (1998); University of Portland (2007); Franciscan University of Steubenville (2010); and Bethlehem University (2011).
- He was made Commander Grand Cross of the Order of the Northern Star (Sweden, 1991), Knight with the Collar of the Order of the Holy Sepulchre (Holy See, 1991), Grand Cross of the Order of Bernardo O'Higgins (Chile, 1996), and Grand Cross of the Order of the Liberator General San Martin (Argentina, 2003).
- The Cardinal Foley Center at St. Joseph's University is named after him.
- Cardinal Foley Catholic School of Havertown, Pennsylvania is named after him.
- John Cardinal Foley Award and Symposium, Saint Charles Borromeo Seminary.

Catholic Church titles
Preceded by Andrzej Maria Deskur	President of the Pontifical Council for Social Communications; 1984–2007	Succeeded by Claudio Maria Celli
Preceded by Carlo Furno	Grand Master of the Order of the Holy Sepulchre; 2007–2011	Succeeded by Edwin Frederick O'Brien
