= Martin Nicholas Lohmuller =

American prelate

- Auxiliary Bishop Emeritus of Philadelphia, Titular Bishop of Ramsbiria
- Church: Roman Catholic Church
- See: Titular See of Ramsbiria
- In office: 1970–1994
- Previous post(s): Auxiliary Bishop of Archdiocese of Philadelphia; Bishop

Orders
- Ordination: June 3, 1944

Personal details
- Born: August 21, 1919; Philadelphia, Pennsylvania United States
- Died: January 24, 2017 (aged 97)

Styles of Martin Lohmuller
- Reference style: The Most Reverend
- Spoken style: Your Excellency
- Religious style: Monsignor

Martin Nicholas Lohmuller (August 21, 1919 – January 24, 2017) was an American prelate of the Roman Catholic Church. He served as an auxiliary bishop of Philadelphia from 1970 to 1994. At the time of his death, he was the oldest American Catholic bishop.

== Biography ==
Lohmuller was born in Philadelphia, Pennsylvania, the son of Martin Nicholas and Mary Frances (née Doser) Lohmuller. He attended St. Henry School in North Philadelphia and attended Northeast Catholic High School but did not graduate. Rather desiring to enter the seminary as soon as possible, he began studies at St. Charles Borromeo Seminary in Overbrook, from where he obtained a Bachelor of Arts degree in 1942. Lohmuller was ordained to the priesthood on June 30, 1944, and then taught at St. James Catholic High School for Boys until 1948.

He earned a doctorate in canon law from the Catholic University of America School of Canon Law in 1947, and taught for a year at St. James High School in Chester. He was then transferred to the Diocese of Harrisburg, where Bishop George Leech needed a canon lawyer to reorganize his tribunal. He was elected vice president of the Canon Law Society of America in October 1954. He also served as the founding pastor of Our Lady of Good Counsel Church in Marysville (1954–1964), Vicar for Religious in the Harrisburg Diocese (1958–1970), and pastor of St. Catherine Laboure Church in Harrisburg (1964–1968). He also led the effort to establish Holy Spirit Hospital in Camp Hill, which opened in 1963.

On February 12, 1970, Lohmuller was appointed Auxiliary Bishop of Philadelphia and Titular Bishop of Ramsbiria by Pope Paul VI. He received his episcopal consecration on the following April 2 from John Cardinal Krol, with Bishops Gerald McDevitt and John Graham serving as co-consecrators. He selected as his episcopal motto: "Love, Fidelity, Peace."

In addition to his role as auxiliary, he was vicar general of the Archdiocese, and pastor of both Old St. Mary's Parish and Holy Trinity Parish from 1976 to 1989. After reaching the mandatory retirement age of 75, Lohmuller resigned as Auxiliary Bishop of Philadelphia on October 11, 1994. He did, however, retain his titular see. He lived at St. Cyril of Jerusalem Parish in Jamison. Lohmuller died on January 24, 2017, at the age of 97.

== See also ==
- Archdiocese of Philadelphia

Catholic Church titles
Preceded by –	Auxiliary Bishop of Philadelphia; 1970–1994	Succeeded by –
