= John Krol =

American Catholic cardinal (1910–1996)

His Eminence John Joseph Krol
- Cardinal, Archbishop of Philadelphia
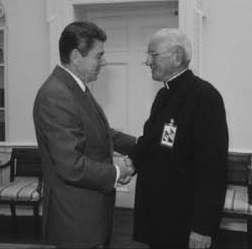
- Ronald Reagan (left) hosted the Cardinal in the Oval Office in 1981
- See: Philadelphia
- Appointed: February 11, 1961
- Installed: March 22, 1961
- Term ended: February 11, 1988
- Predecessor: John Francis O'Hara
- Successor: Anthony Bevilacqua
- Other post: Cardinal Priest of Santa Maria della Mercede e Sant'Adriano a Villa Albani
- Previous post: Auxiliary Bishop of Cleveland (1953–61)

Orders
- Ordination: February 20, 1937 by Joseph Schrembs
- Consecration: July 11, 1953 by Amleto Giovanni Cicognani
- Created cardinal: June 26, 1967 by Paul VI
- Rank: Cardinal-Priest

Personal details
- Born: October 26, 1910 Cleveland, Ohio, U.S.
- Died: March 3, 1996 (aged 85) Philadelphia, Pennsylvania, U.S.
- Motto: Deus rex meus (God is my king)
- Coat of arms: John Joseph Krol's coat of arms

Styles of John Krol
- Reference style: His Eminence
- Spoken style: Your Eminence
- Religious style: Cardinal
- Posthumous style: none
- Informal style: Cardinal
- See: Philadelphia

Ordination history of John Krol
History
Episcopal consecration
- Consecrated by: Amleto Giovanni Cicognani
- Date: September 2, 1953
Episcopal succession
Bishops consecrated by John Krol as principal consecrator
- Dennis Vincent Durning, C.S.Sp.: May 28, 1963
- Joseph Thomas Daley: January 7, 1964
- John Joseph Graham: January 7, 1964
- Alfred Michael Watson: June 29, 1965
- Giovanni Enrico Boccella: April 17, 1968
- Martin Nicholas Lohmuller: April 2, 1970
- Thomas Jerome Welsh: April 2, 1970
- James Steven Rausch: April 26, 1973
- Michael Bosco Duraisamy: June 10, 1974
- Edward Thomas Hughes: July 21, 1976
- Louis Anthony DeSimone: August 12, 1981
- Francis Bible Schulte: August 12, 1981
- John Patrick Foley: May 8, 1984

John Joseph Krol (October 26, 1910 – March 3, 1996) was an American prelate of the Catholic Church. He was Archbishop of Philadelphia from 1961 to 1988, having previously served as an auxiliary bishop of the Diocese of Cleveland (1953–1961), and was elevated to the cardinalate in 1967 by Pope Paul VI.

== Early life and education ==
Krol was born in Cleveland, Ohio, the fourth of eight children of John (Jan) and Anna (née Pietruszka) Król. His parents were Polish immigrants who were originally from the Tatra Mountains. Krol's father held various occupations, working as a machinist, barber, carpenter, plumber and electrician; his mother worked as a maid at a hotel in Cleveland. At age 2, he and his family returned to Poland, but returned to Cleveland within a year. Krol received his early education at the parochial school of St. Hyacinth Church. At age 9, he went to work part-time as a butcher's helper. He later worked as a maker of wooden boxes.

Krol attended Cathedral Latin High School, graduating at age 16 in 1927. He then took a job as a butcher at a Kroger grocery store in Cleveland, where he became manager of the meat department at age 18. Religious questions from a Lutheran co-worker prompted Krol to more deeply study Catholic theology and eventually decide to enter the priesthood. He began his studies at St. Mary's College in Orchard Lake, Michigan. He later enrolled at St. Mary's Seminary in his native Cleveland. At St. Mary's, he also operated a small tobacco business, receiving shipments of defective cigars and then selling them to his fellow seminarians.

== Priesthood ==
On February 20, 1937, Krol was ordained a priest by Bishop Joseph Schrembs at the Cathedral of St. John the Evangelist. His first assignment was as a curate at Immaculate Heart of Mary Church in Cleveland, where he remained for one year. In 1938, he was sent to continue his studies at the Pontifical Gregorian University in Rome, where he earned a Licentiate of Canon Law in 1940. He received a Doctor of Canon Law degree from the Catholic University of America School of Canon Law in Washington, D.C., in 1942.

Following his return to Cleveland, Krol served as professor of canon law at St. Mary's Seminary from 1942 to 1943. He served as vice-chancellor (1943–51) and chancellor (1951–54) of the Diocese of Cleveland. He was named a papal chamberlain in 1945, and was raised to the rank of domestic prelate in 1951. In 1950, he became president of the Canon Law Society of America.

== Episcopacy ==
=== Cleveland ===
On July 11, 1953, Krol was appointed auxiliary bishop of Cleveland and titular bishop of Cardi by Pope Pius XII. He received his episcopal consecration on the following September 2 from Archbishop Amleto Giovanni Cicognani, with Archbishop Edward Francis Hoban and Bishop Floyd Lawrence Begin serving as co-consecrators, at the Cathedral of St. John the Evangelist. In addition to his episcopal duties, he was named vicar general of the Diocese of Cleveland in 1954.

=== Philadelphia ===
Following the death of Cardinal John Francis O'Hara, Krol was appointed the sixth Archbishop of Philadelphia by Pope John XXIII on February 11, 1961. His installation took place at the Cathedral of SS. Peter and Paul on March 22 of that year. He was the first Polish American to become an archbishop, and, at age 50, was the youngest Catholic archbishop in the country at the time. In his first sermon as archbishop, Krol spoke of the need for civic dedication and virtue, saying, "I am conscious, too, of our beloved country, the bold idealism that inspired it, the courage that gave it birth. May God grant that our prayers, the moral integrity of our lives, the clarity of our teaching, and the sincerity of our patriotism help increase the spiritual resources without which no nation can survive."

Krol attended all four sessions of the Second Vatican Council between 1962 and 1965. During the council, he served as one of six permanent undersecretaries, with responsibility for keeping a record of votes and distributing, collecting and tabulating ballots. He also served as a member of the central coordinating committee. Like Pope Paul VI, he was more liberal in social principles but sternly conservative in those of doctrine and church government. He condemned arms races and abortion, but supported clerical celibacy and disarmament.

He was created Cardinal-Priest of S. Maria della Mercede e Sant'Adriano a Villa Albani by Paul VI on June 26, 1967, during the same consistory that elevated Archbishop Karol Wojtyła of Kraków, Poland. Both were cardinal electors in the conclaves of August and October 1978. Wojtyła became Pope John Paul II in the latter conclave, and Krol served as one of his closest advisors.

After the first meeting between Church and Freemasonry which had been held on 11 April 1969 at the convent of the Divine Master in Ariccia, he was the protagonist of a series of public handshakes between high prelates of the Roman Catholic Church and the heads of Freemasonry.

During the 1960s and 1970s, Krol governed the Archdiocese of Philadelphia through an era where the population shifted to the suburbs. Krol campaigned for the canonization of Katharine Drexel, and was present at the canonization of his Czech-born predecessor in Philadelphia, Bishop John Neumann. He made a celebrated pilgrimage to Poland in 1972, and served as President of the United States Conference of Catholic Bishops from 1971 to 1974. On April 5, 1970, he led prayer services at the White House for President Richard Nixon and the Johnson and Bush families; in addition to Nixon the former President Lyndon B. Johnson and the future Presidents George H. W. Bush and George W. Bush were in attendance. In 1985, Krol baptized Polish United Workers' Party defector Romuald Spasowski.

== Later life and legacy ==
Krol was hospitalized in 1987 for treatment of diverticulosis. Due to his ill health, he resigned as Archbishop of Philadelphia on February 11, 1988, exactly 27 years after he was appointed to the post. He was succeeded by Anthony Bevilacqua.

Krol died at age 85 in Philadelphia, where he is buried in the crypt beneath the Cathedral-Basilica of Sts. Peter and Paul.

Cardinal Krol was criticized for his role in the archidocese's sex abuse scandal some 10 years after his death. The Grand Jury stated that Krol knew that some priests under his command were molesting and raping young boys and girls but did nothing to prevent future crimes. A 2005 grand jury report cited evidence that both Cardinal Krol (Archbishop of Philadelphia 1961–1988) and his successor Cardinal Anthony Bevilacqua (Archbishop of Philadelphia 1988–2003) had allowed dozens of sexually abusive priests to stay in holy orders by transferring them from parish to parish to avoid a scandal.

E. Michael Jones published a biography of Krol in 1995 titled John Cardinal Krol and the Cultural Revolution. The book covers Krol's early life and his time as President of the U.S. Conference of Catholic Bishops during the turbulent times of the 1970s. In order to give Jones sources for the book, Krol allowed Jones access to the Archdiocese of Philadelphia archives.

== Views ==
Krol was widely considered to be a staunch conservative, even a "traditionalist". As described by The New York Times, he was "an outspoken defender of traditional theology, hierarchical authority and strict church discipline." The Philadelphia Inquirer recalled how Krol was "[ha]iled by conservatives as a defender of the church's heritage and criticized by liberals as an opponent of change." However, despite his conservative views on doctrine and church government, he was more liberal on social principles, such as nuclear disarmament and humanitarian programs.

=== Abortion ===
In 1973, he called the Supreme Court's decisions overturning state laws banning abortion "an unspeakable tragedy for this nation" that "sets in motion developments which are terrifying to contemplate." In 1974, Krol testified before the Senate Judiciary Committee regarding the Human Life Amendment proposed by New York Senator James L. Buckley. While mostly in favor, Krol argued that the amendment should drop the exception for when the mother's life was in danger, so that should abortion be banned under all circumstances. Krol in his statement said of Roe v. Wade:

Every week, since the Supreme Court's decisions of January 22, 1973, there have been as many deaths from abortion as there were deaths at Nagasaki as a result of the atomic bomb. Every nine days there are as many deaths from abortion as there were American deaths in the 10 years of the Vietnam war."

=== Marriages ===
He opposed looser regulations governing marriages between Catholics and non-Catholics.

=== Contraception ===
He referred to the Catholic Church's condemnation of contraception, reaffirmed by Pope Paul VI in 1968, as "divine law."

=== Nuclear disarmament ===
In 1979, his Congressional testimony backing talks on limiting strategic arms foreshadowed an appeal in a pastoral letter by American bishops for nuclear disarmament in 1983. At the high tide of the nuclear freeze movement in 1982, Cardinal Krol told 15,000 demonstrators at a Philadelphia rally that it was time for governments "to dismantle existing nuclear weapons." He later acknowledged that his belief in gradual and reciprocal disarmament, with strong safeguards against cheating, was probably not shared by all the demonstrators.

=== Second Vatican Council ===
After the close of the Second Vatican Council in 1965, he soon joined those alarmed by the pressures for change that the Council produced. He opposed many of the small accommodations or options in church discipline that gained favor after Vatican II, including looser regulations governing marriages between Catholics and non-Catholics, the reception of Communion in the hand, and attending Mass on Saturday evening instead of Sunday.

=== Tax credits for Catholic schools ===
In 1984, Cardinal Krol appeared with President Ronald Reagan at a campaign rally at the National Shrine of Our Lady of Czestochowa shrine in Doylestown, Pennsylvania, praising Reagan for trying to win tax credits for parents of children in religious schools. In the same year, the Cardinal delivered an invocation at the 1984 Republican National Convention in Dallas.

== Personal life ==
He spoke eleven languages.

Catholic Church titles
Preceded by John Francis O'Hara, C.S.C.	Archbishop of Philadelphia; 1961–1988	Succeeded by Anthony Bevilacqua
Preceded by John Dearden	President of the United States Catholic Conference and National Conference of Catholic Bishops; 1971–1974	Succeeded by Joseph Bernardin
