= Sant'Adriano al Foro =

Former church in Rome

Coordinates: 41°53′34.55″N 12°29′7.45″E

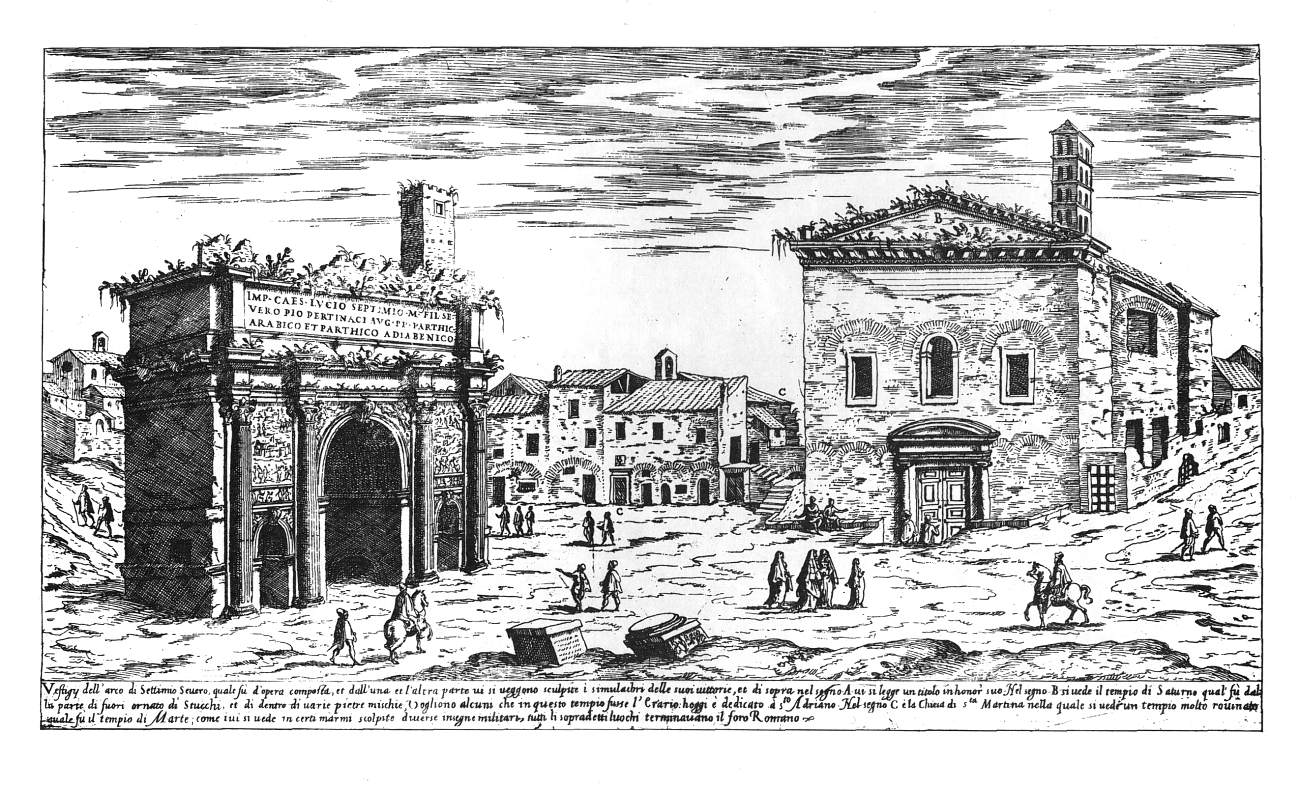
The church (right) around 1500; with the Arch of Septimius Severus

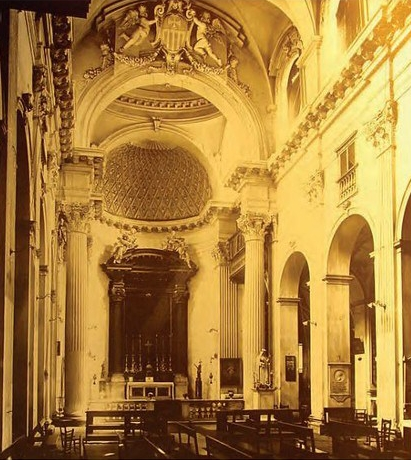
The interior, looking east, of Sant'Adriano al Foro

Sant'Adriano al Foro was a church in Rome, formerly in the Curia Julia in the Forum Romanum and a cardinal-deaconry (a titular church for a cardinal-deacon).

== The church ==
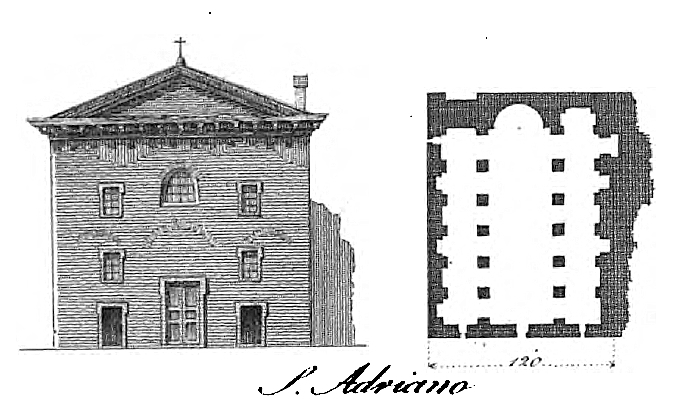
Plan (1835) of Sant'Adriano

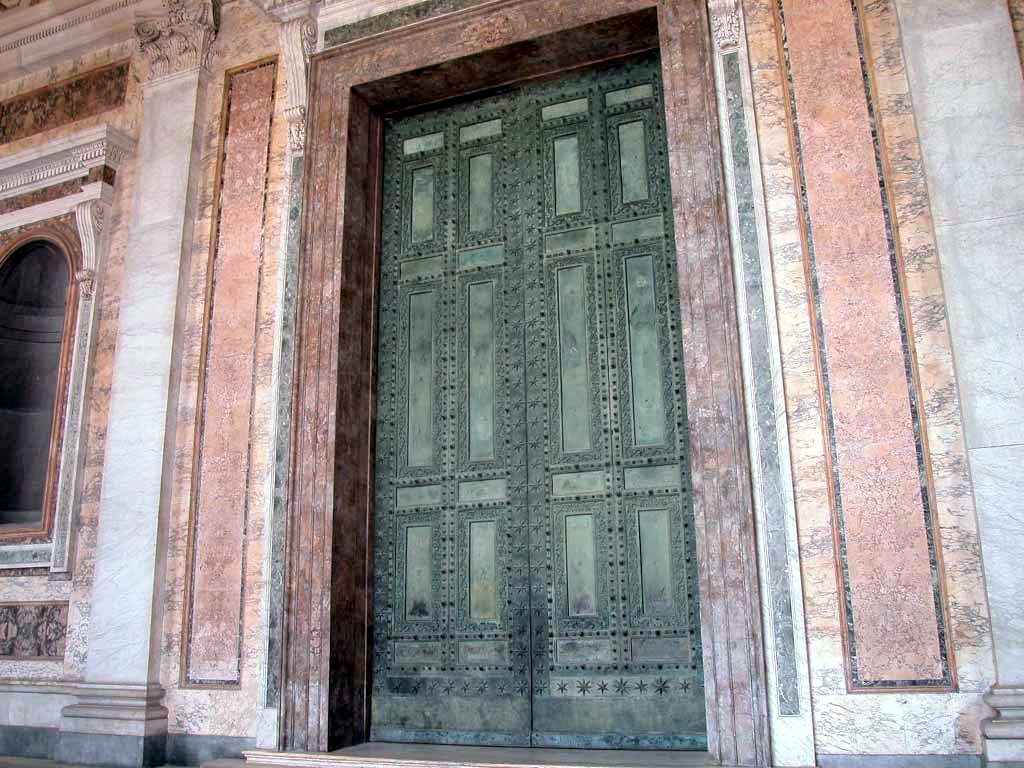
Doors of Sant'Adriano/Senate House, now at Saint John Lateran

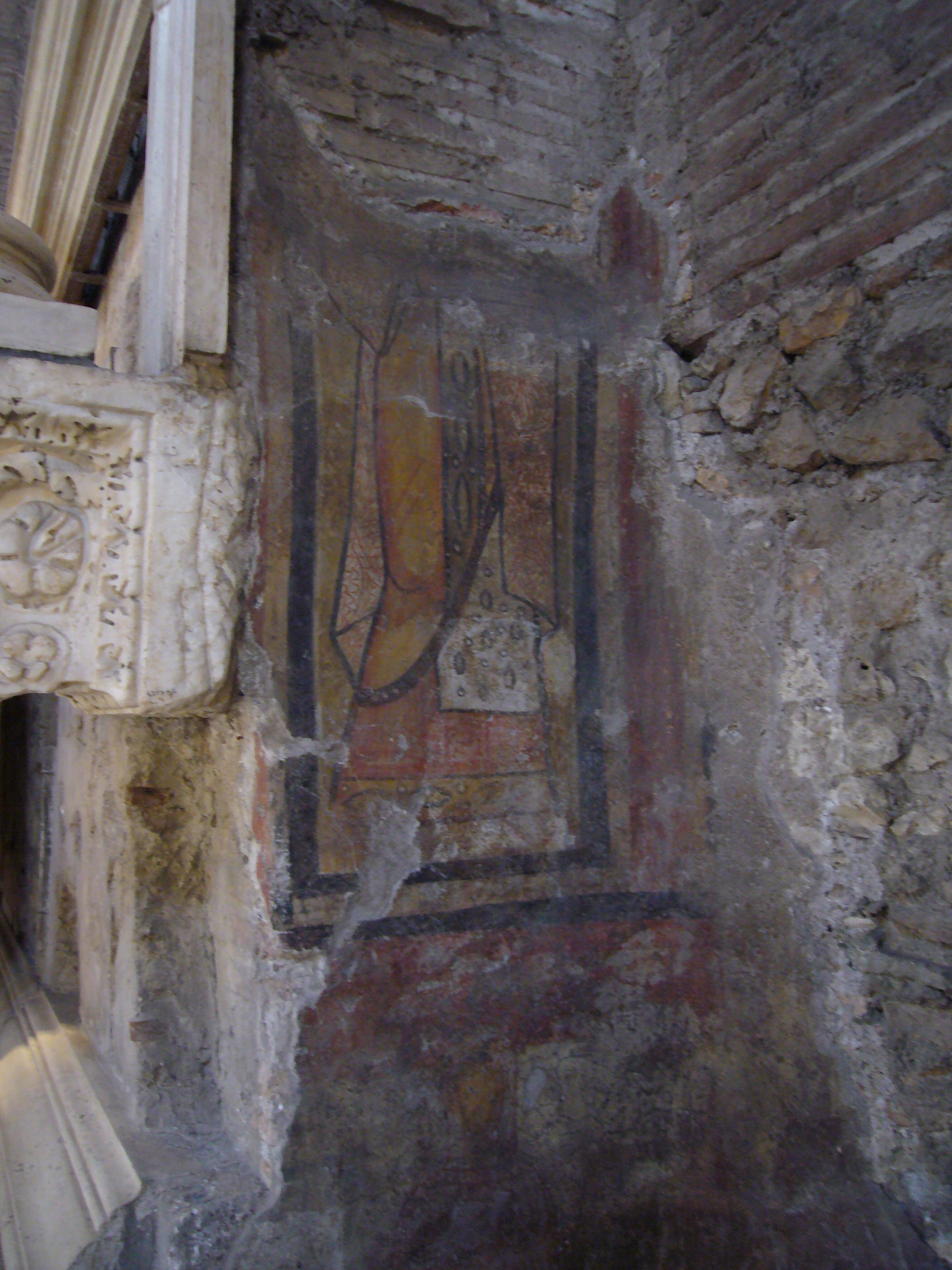
Remains of a fresco

The Church of Sant'Adriano al Foro (Italian for Saint (H)Adrian at the Roman Forum) was a conversion of the Curia Julia, which had housed the Senate of Ancient Rome, by Pope Honorius I in 630. The Curia Julia was begun in 44 BC by Julius Caesar and finished by Augustus in 29 BC.

The end of the 6th and the beginning of the 7th century mark for Rome a period of profound decay. The curia had been abandoned until Honorius decided to erect the church.

Its name refers to the martyr Adrian of Nicomedia (died 306). Paintings are still visible in a side chapel which depict scenes from the life of Adrian; there are also some Byzantine paintings. It was designated by Pope Sergius I (687–701) as the starting point for the litanies during certain the procession liturgical feasts of the Virgin Mary, Presentation in the Temple, Annunciation, Assumption and Nativity. Pope Gregory IX made substantial changes to the building in 1228.

In 1590 the relics of saints Papias and Maurus were rediscovered in the church and transferred to Santa Maria in Vallicella. In 1660, its large bronze doors were moved by order of Pope Alexander VII to adorn the main portal of the Basilica of Saint John Lateran. A coin was found within the doors during their transfer that dated repairs made to the curia and the addition of the bronze doors to the reign of Emperor Domitian (AD 81–96).

=== Reconstruction as Curia Julia ===
Its structure was modified multiple times before it was deconsecrated in the 1930s to recover the ancient structure of the building. On either side of the entrance are niches corresponding to medieval burials. The painting of the Holy Family, a product of the school of Raphael, was moved to the modern Church of Santa Maria della Mercede (1958), and the dedication to Saint Adrian added to that church.

== Cardinal deaconry ==
It was established in 734 as Cardinal Deaconry of Sant'Adriano al Foro.

On 25 January 1946, the title was suppressed to establish the Cardinal Deaconry of San Paolo alla Regola.

=== Cardinal deacons ===
The following Cardinals have been Cardinal deacons of the Deaconry, except in special circumstances, which are noted by italics.

- Blessed Berardo dei Marsi (1099 – 1100)
- Matthaeus ( - 1127/1128) (promoted to Cardinal Priest of San Pietro in Vincoli)
- Pierre (1127.12 – 1130), later Pseudocardinal-Priest of Sant'Eusebio (1130 – death 1130?)
- Guido (1130 – 1138?)
- Germano (1130.03.29 – ?), pseudocardinal created by Antipope Anacletus II
- Ubaldo Aucingoli (1138 – May 1141), appointed Cardinal-priest of Santa Prassede
- Gilberto [Ghilibertus] (1141 – 1143.12.17)
- Giovanni Paparoni (1143.12.17 – 1151.03.02)
- Alberto di Morra (1155.12 – 1158), later Pope Gregory VIII
- Cinzio Papareschi (1158.02 – 1178.09)
- Eutichio (1178.09.22 – 1178?)
- Rainier (1178.09.22 – 1182.08)
- Gerardo (1182 – 1208)
- Angelo (1212.02.18 – 1215.11.29)
- Stefano de Normandis dei Conti (1216 – 1228)
- Goffredo da Trani (1244.05.28 – 1245)
- Ottobono de Fieschi (1251.12 – 1276.07.11), later Pope Adrian V
- Napoleone Orsini (1288.05.16 – 1342.03.23)
- Rinaldo Orsini (1350.12.17 – 1374.06.06)
- Gentile di Sangro (1378.09.18 – 1385.12)
- Ludovico Fieschi (1385.01 – 1423.04.03)
- Bonifacio Ammannati (1397.12.21 – death 1399.07.19), pseudo-cardinal created by Antipope Benedict XIII
- Hugues de Lusignan (1426.05.27 – 1431.03.11)
- Stefano Nardini (1473.05.07 – 1476), Cardinal priest pro hac vice
- Giovanni d'Aragona (1477.12.12 – 1480.01.14); promoted Cardinal priest pro hac vice (1480.01.14 – 1483.09.10)
- Cardinal Giovanni Conti (1485.10.18 – 1489.03.09 in commendam, while Cardinal-Priest of Santi Nereo e Achilleo (1483.11.15 – 1489.03.09)
- Pierre d'Aubusson (1489.03.23 – 1503.07.03)
- François Guillaume de Castelnau de Clermont-Lodève (1503.12.06 – 1509.05.02), in commendam (1509.05.02 – 1511.03.17)
- Bandinello Sauli (1511.03.17 – 1511.10.24)
- Agostino Trivulzio (1517.07.06 – 1537.08.17); in commendam 1537.08.17 – 1537.09.06 while transferred as Cardinal-Deacon of Sant'Eustachio (1537.08.17 – 1537.09.06), finally again Cardinal-Deacon of Sant'Adriano al Foro (1537.09.06 – 1548.03.30)
- Jean du Bellay (1548.04.09 – 1549.02.25, Cardinal priest pro hac vice
- Odet de Coligny de Châtillon (1549.02.25 – 1563.03.31), became a Protestant, and gave up the Cardinalate and his Deaconry.
- Innico d'Avalos d' Aragona, Military Order of Saint James the Sword (O.S.), (1563.07.30 – 1565.01.19); promoted Cardinal priest pro hac vice (1480.01.14 – 1483.09.10)
- Fulvio Giulio della Corgna, (O.B.E.) (1567.03.03 – 1574.05.05, Cardinal priest pro hac vice
- Prospero Santacroce (1574.05.05 – 1583.03.04), Cardinal priest pro hac vice
- Andrzej Báthory (1584.07.23 – 1587.01.07)
- Girolamo Mattei (1587.01.14 – 1587.04.20)
- Agostino Cusani (1589.01.09 – 1591.01.14)
- Odoardo Farnese (1591.11.20 – 1595.06.12)
- Francesco Mantica (1596.06.21 – 1597.01.24)
- Giovanni Battista Deti (1599.03.17 – 1599.12.15)
- Alessandro d'Este (1600.04.17 – 1600.11.15)
- Giovanni Doria (1605.12.05 – 1623.10.02)
- Louis de Nogaret de La Valette (1623.11.20 – 1639.09.27)
- Achille d'Estampes de Valençay (1644.05.02 – 1646.06.27)
- Francesco Maidalchini (1647.12.16 – 1653.05.05)
- Decio Azzolini (1654.03.23 – 1668.03.12)
- Carlo Cerri (1670.05.19 – 1690.05.14)
- Giovanni Francesco Albani (1690.05.22 – 1700.03.30) (later Pope Clement XI)
- Pietro Priuli (1706.06.25 – 1720.05.06)
- Alessandro Albani (1721.09.24 – 1722.09.23)
- Giulio Alberoni (1724.06.12 – 1728.09.20)
- Neri Maria Corsini (1731.01.08 – 1737.05.06)
- Marcellino Corio (1739.09.30 – 1742.02.20)
- Girolamo De Bardi (1743.09.23 – 1753.05.28)
- Giovanni Francesco Banchieri (1753.12.10 – 1763.10.18)
- Enea Silvio Piccolomini (1766.12.01 – 1768.11.18)
- Carlo Livizzani Forni (1785.04.11 – 1794.02.21)
- Luigi Gazzoli (1803.09.26 – 1809.01.23)
- Lorenzo Prospero Bottini (1817.11.15 – 1818.08.11)
- Cesare Guerrieri Gonzaga (1819.12.17 – 1832.02.05)
- Giuseppe Ugolini (1838.09.13 – 1855.12.17)
- Camillo Mazzella, Jesuits (S.J.- (1886.06.10 – 1896.06.22)
- José de Calasanz Félix Santiago Vives y Tutó, O.F.M. Cap. (1899.06.22 – 1913.09.07)
- Evaristo Lucidi (1923.12.23 – 1929.03.31)

== Bibliography ==
- Michele Dattoli, L'aula del Senato Romano e la chiesa di S. Adriano (Roma: Maglione & Strini, 1921).
- Antonio Nibby, Roma nell'anno MDCCCXXXVIII: pte. I-II. Antica (Roma: Tipografia delle belle arti, 1839), pp. 27–32.
