= Cathedral Basilica of Saints Peter and Paul (Philadelphia) =

Historic church in Pennsylvania, United States

- U.S. National Register of Historic Places
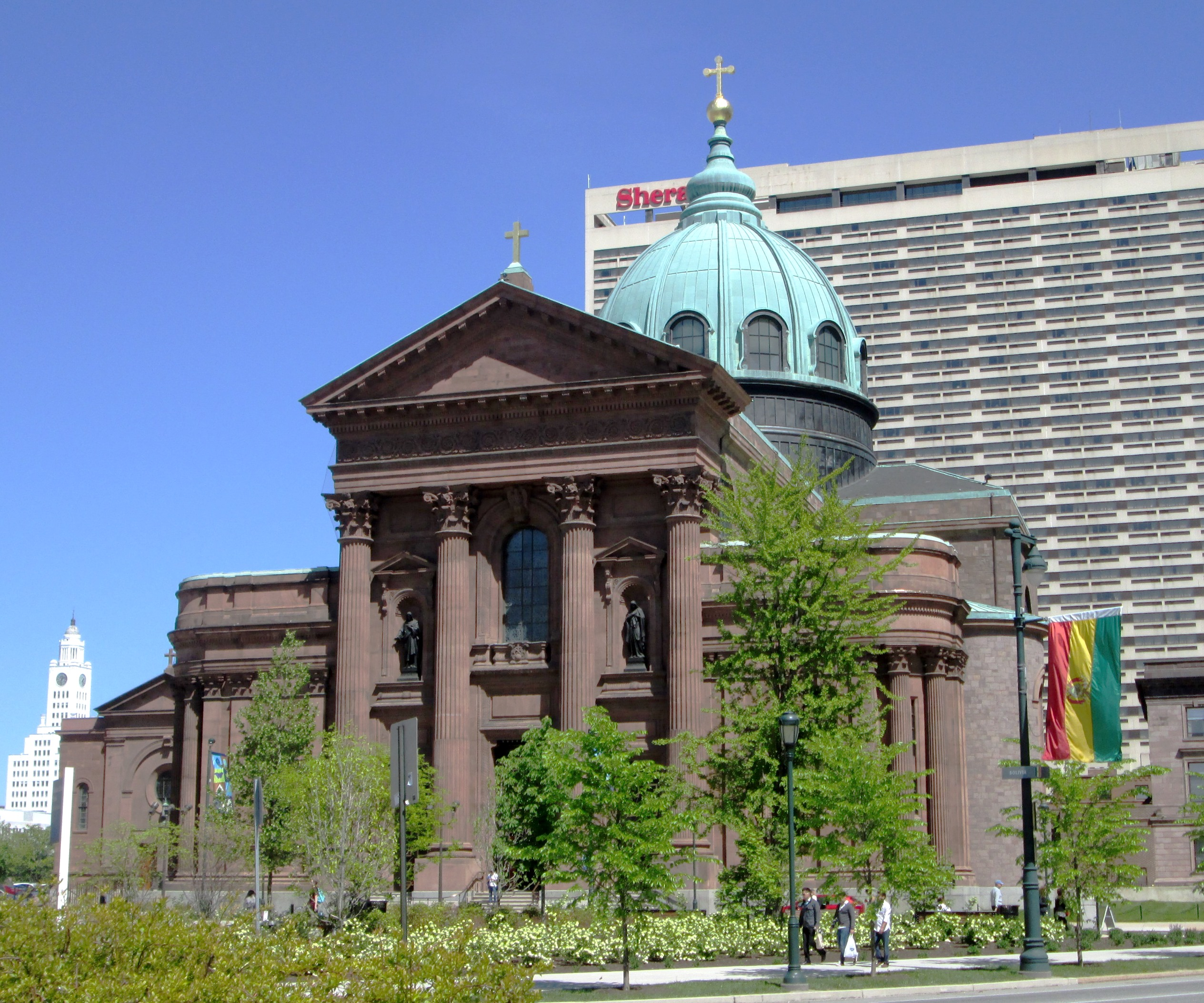
- Cathedral Basilica of Saints Peter and Paul in Philadelphia

- Location within Philadelphia Location within Pennsylvania Location within the United States
- Location: 18th St. and Benjamin Franklin Parkway; Philadelphia, Pennsylvania
- Coordinates: 39°57′27″N 75°10′07″W
- Built: 1846–1864
- Architect: Napoleon LeBrun, et al. John Notman, et al. (dome and facade); John Mahoney; Constantino Brumidi (murals)
- Architectural style: Italian Renaissance, Palladian
- NRHP reference No.: 71000720
- Added to NRHP: June 24, 1971

The Cathedral Basilica of Saints Peter and Paul is the see church for the Archdiocese of Philadelphia. Located in Philadelphia, Pennsylvania, the cathedral was dedicated in 1864 and designated a minor basilica by the Vatican in 1976.

The basilica is the largest Catholic church in the state of Pennsylvania, with a seating capacity of 2,000.

Saints Peter and Paul was designed by Napoleon LeBrun. Construction began in 1846. Its dome and Palladian facade, designed by John Notman, were added after 1850. The interior was decorated by Constantino Brumidi. Construction finished in 1864.

The cathedral is listed on the U.S. National Register of Historic Places. It has hosted papal masses by Pope John Paul II and Pope Francis. As of 2025, the rector of the basilica is the Reverend Gerald Dennis Gill.

== History ==
After being erected by the Vatican in 1808, the Diocese of Philadelphia used two different churches as cathedrals before building Saints Peter and Paul.

- Saint Mary's Church was designated as the new diocese's first cathedral in 1810.
- The need for a larger cathedral prompted the diocese to designate Saint John the Evangelist Church as its cathedral in 1838. However, it soon became inadequate due to the burgeoning Catholic population in the city.

In June 1846, Bishop Francis Kenrick announced plans to construct a larger, new cathedral in Philadelphia. it was to be dedicated to Peter the Apostle and Paul the Apostle. A year earlier, the diocese had purchased a building at 18th and Race Streets for $37,200. The diocese tore down the old building and started construction on the cathedral that same year. The cornerstone of the cathedral was laid in December 1846

Kenrick wanted to avoid raising the debt of the diocese while building Saints Peter and Paul. He sold burial lots at Cathedral Cemetery and New Cathedral Cemetery, both in Philadelphia, to help fund it.He also planned for an extended project time so as to spread out the cathedral cost over time.In 1859, workment completed the cathedral walls and raised the cross to the top of the dome. The cathedral was dedicated in 1864 by Bishop James F. Wood. It was consecrated in 1890.

Archbishop Edmond F. Prendergast, of what was now the Archdiocese of Philadelphia, renovated the cathedral in 1915. He repainted the interior walls, replaced the confessionals, and put a copper lining on the tin roof. Four bronze statues of Mary, Jesus, Peter the Apostle, and Paul the Apostle were installed in niches on the building's main facade.

The archdiocese added the Chapel of Our Lady of the Blessed Sacrament to the cathedral in 1955. The cathedral underwent another renovation in 1956, with the construction of a new apse.

Saints Peter and Paul was designated a minor basilica in 1976 by Pope Paul VI. In 1979, Pope John Paul II celebrated a papal mass at the basilica. The tabernacle was moved to the main altar in 2007. Pope Francis celebrated a mass at the basilica in 2015.In 2017, the archdiocese relocated the shrine of Saint Katharine Drexel to the basilica after St. Elizabeth's Convent in Cornwell Heights, Pennsylvania, closed

== Building ==
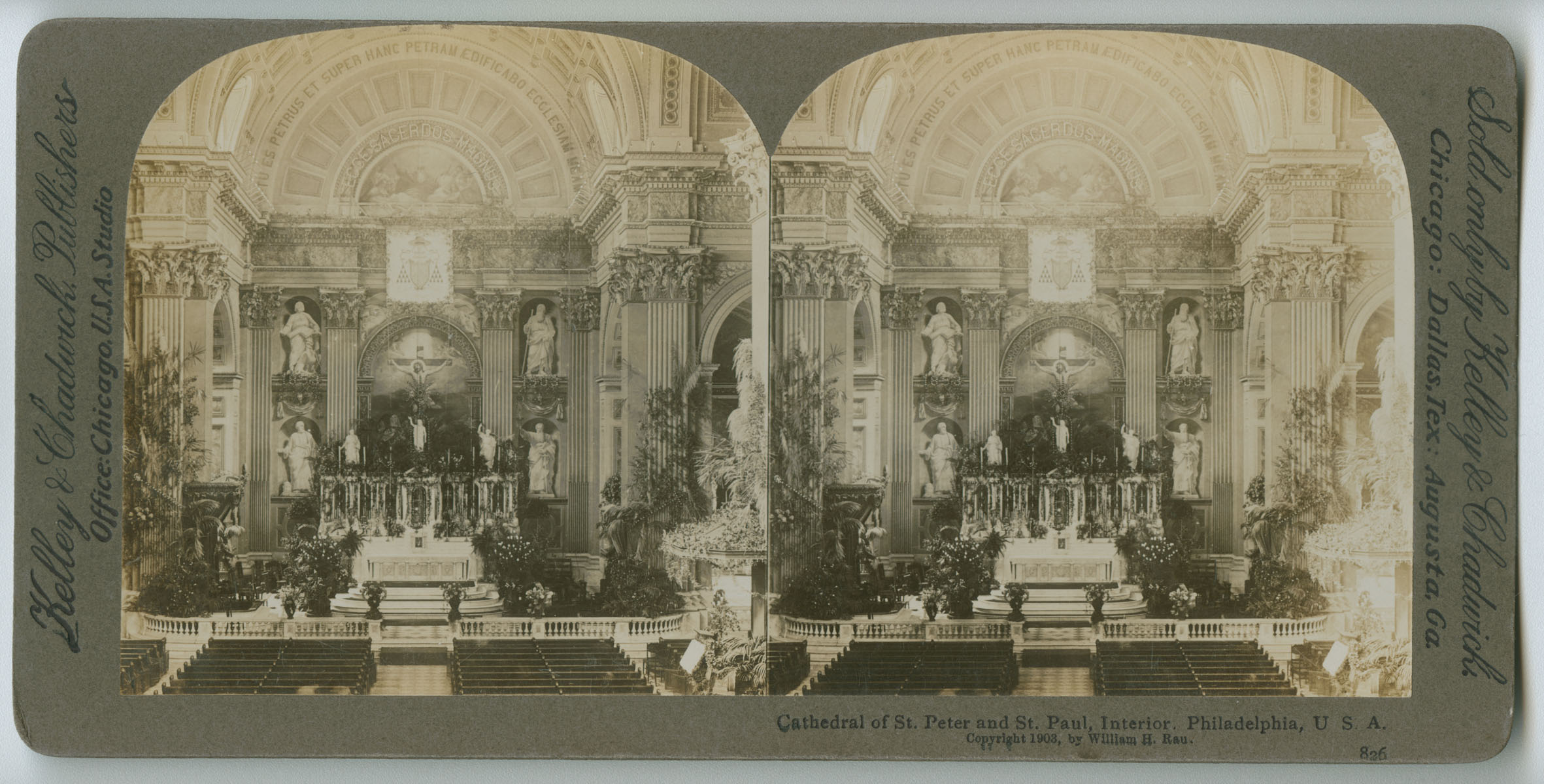
Cathedral chancel prior to the addition of the apse (1903)

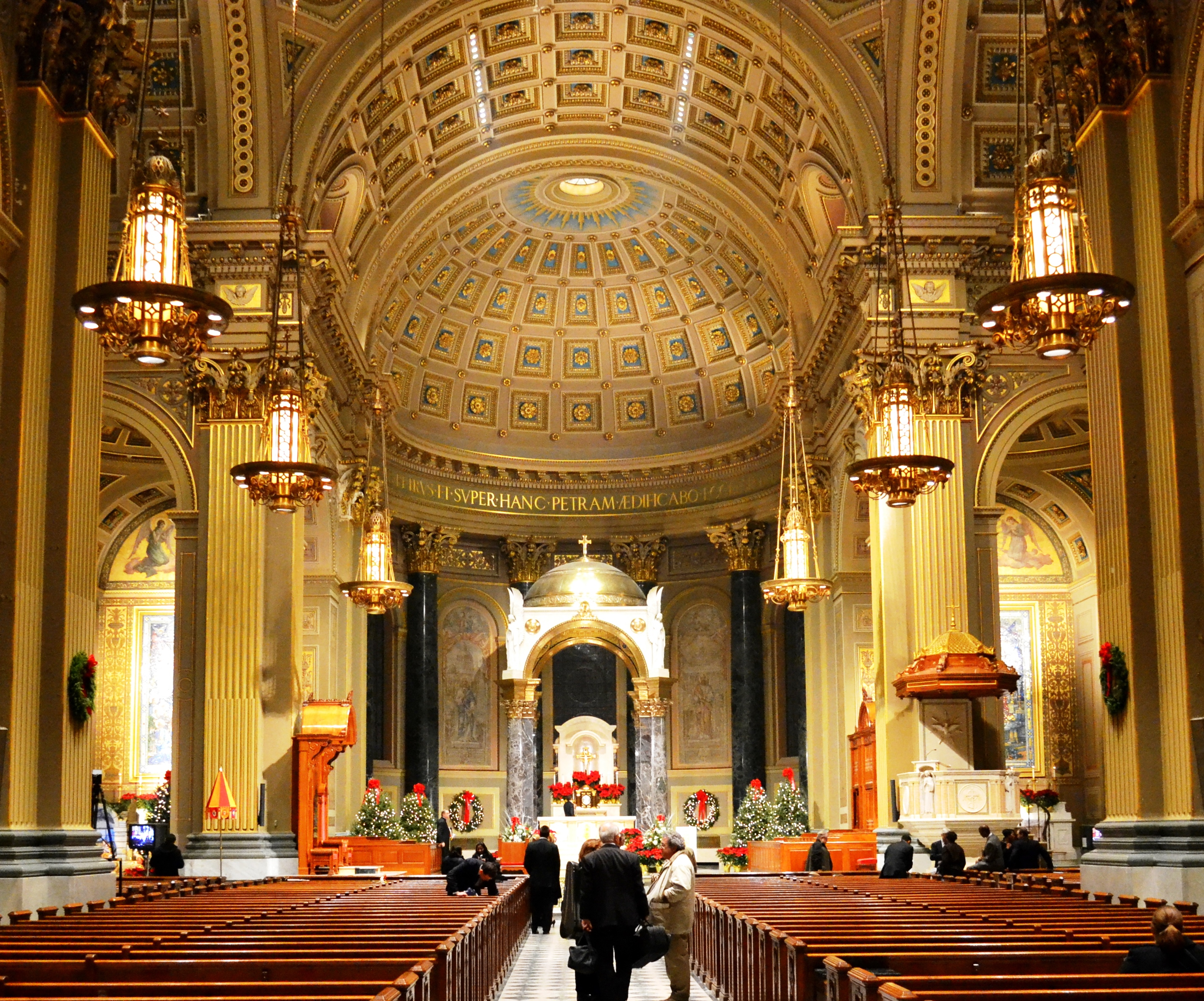
Basilica interior (2011)

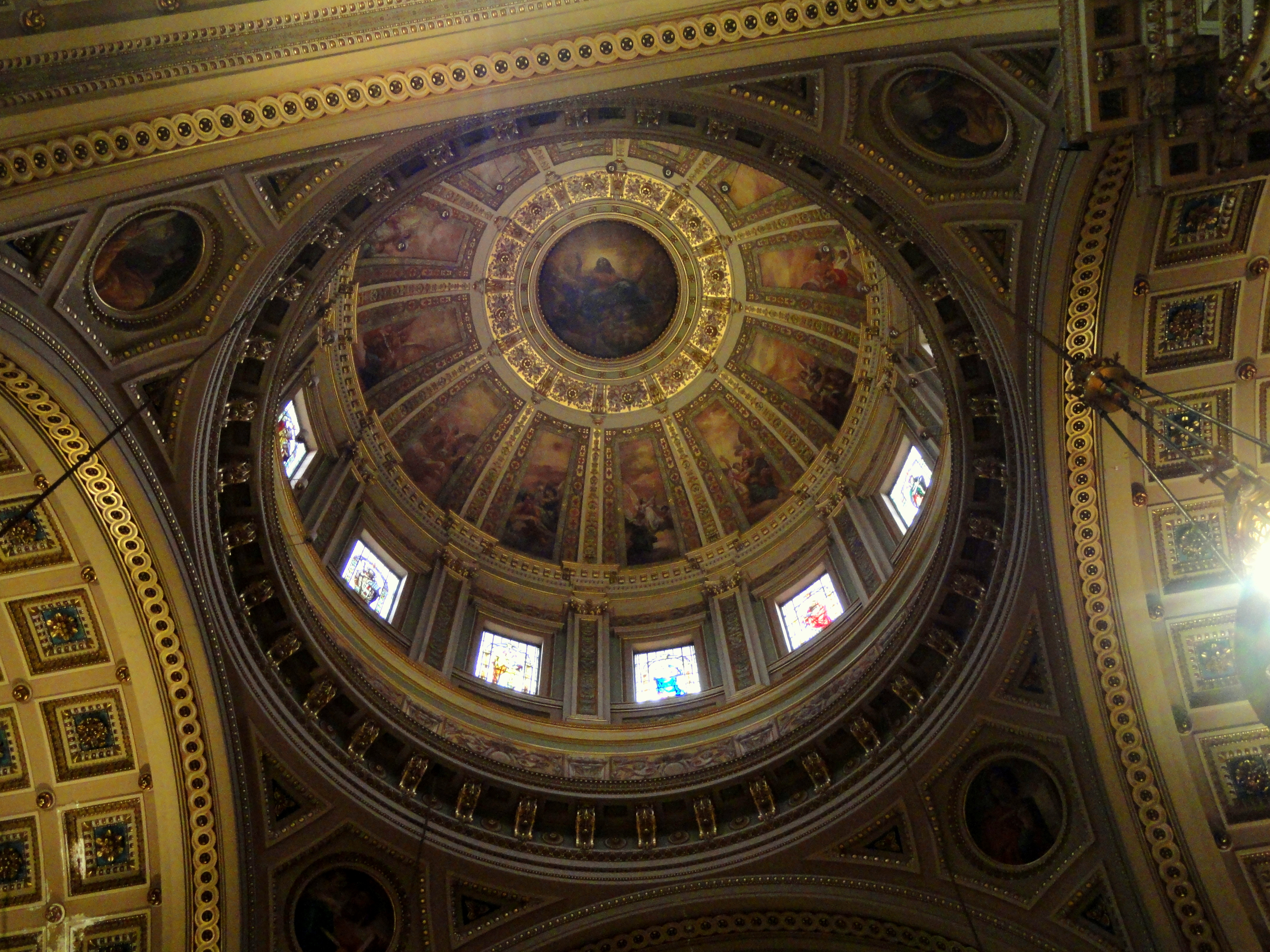
Basilica dome (2011)

With its eight side chapels and main sanctuary that holds 2,000 worshippers, the Cathedral Basilica of Saints Peter and Paul is the largest brownstone structure and one of the most architecturally notable structures in the city of Philadelphia.

The basilica was built in a Roman-Corinthian style of architecture, modeled after the Lombard Church of St. Charles (San Carlo al Corso) in Rome. On the basilica exterior, the Palladian façade and aqua oxidized-copper dome are in the Italian Renaissance manner

The basilica interior features an oversized apse of stained glass and red antique marble in proportions reminiscent of Roman churches. A baldachin made of Italian marble covers the main altar. The three altars on each side aisle are designed in Italian Renaissance style. The Crypt of the Bishops is located in the basement of the basilica

=== Architects and designers ===
To begin the cathedral project, Kenrick in 1846 tasked Reverend Mariano Muller and the Reverend John B. Tornatore with drawing the initial plans for the structure. Kenrick hired the Philadelphia architect Napoleon LeBrun to run the project. LeBrun had previously built the Philadelphia Academy of Music. LeBrun used the Basilica of Sant' Ambrogio et Carlo al Corso, a Neo Classical style Italian Renaissance church in Rome, as his inspiration.

LeBrun's original plans for the cathedral called for clerestory windows at a low level. However, Kenrick wanted them much higher. This was because mobs had caused massive destruction of church property in 1844 during anti-Catholic riots. According to local legend, one day Kenrick asked the strongest workman on the cathedral worksite to throw a stone in the air. He then directed the architects to place the windows about the high point of that throw.

In 1851, LeBrun left the project due to a dispute.To replace LeBrun, the diocese hired John Notman who added the dome and facade to the building. In 1857, Coadjutor Bishop Wood assumed supervision of the project. That same year, Notman quit after a dispute about money. Woods then hired John Mahoney to replace Notman and three years later persuaded LeBrun to finish the cathedral in 1864.

Constantino Brumidi painted the ceiling mural in the dome, The Assumption of the Virgin into Heaven in 1868, and the round portraits of St. Matthew, St. Mark, St. Luke, and St. John on its pendentives. Architect Henry D. Dagit renovated the cathedral interior in 1914, adding the apse behind the high altar. D'Ascenzo Studios executed the apse's stained glass windows and mosaic murals.

== Crypt of the bishops ==
Opened in 1869, the crypt is located under the main altar of the basilica.

=== Bishops and archbishops ===
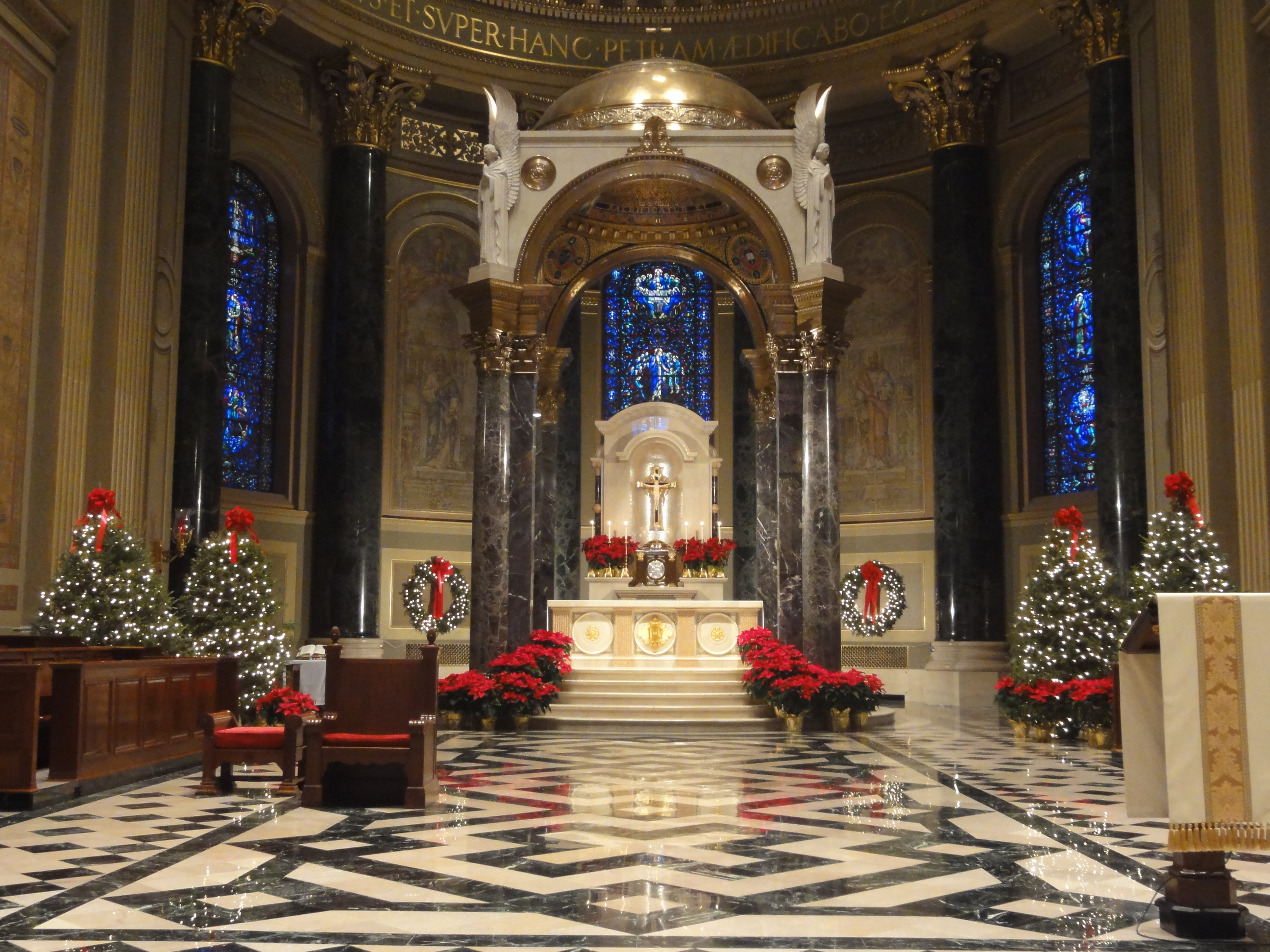
Basilica high altar and baldachin (2012)

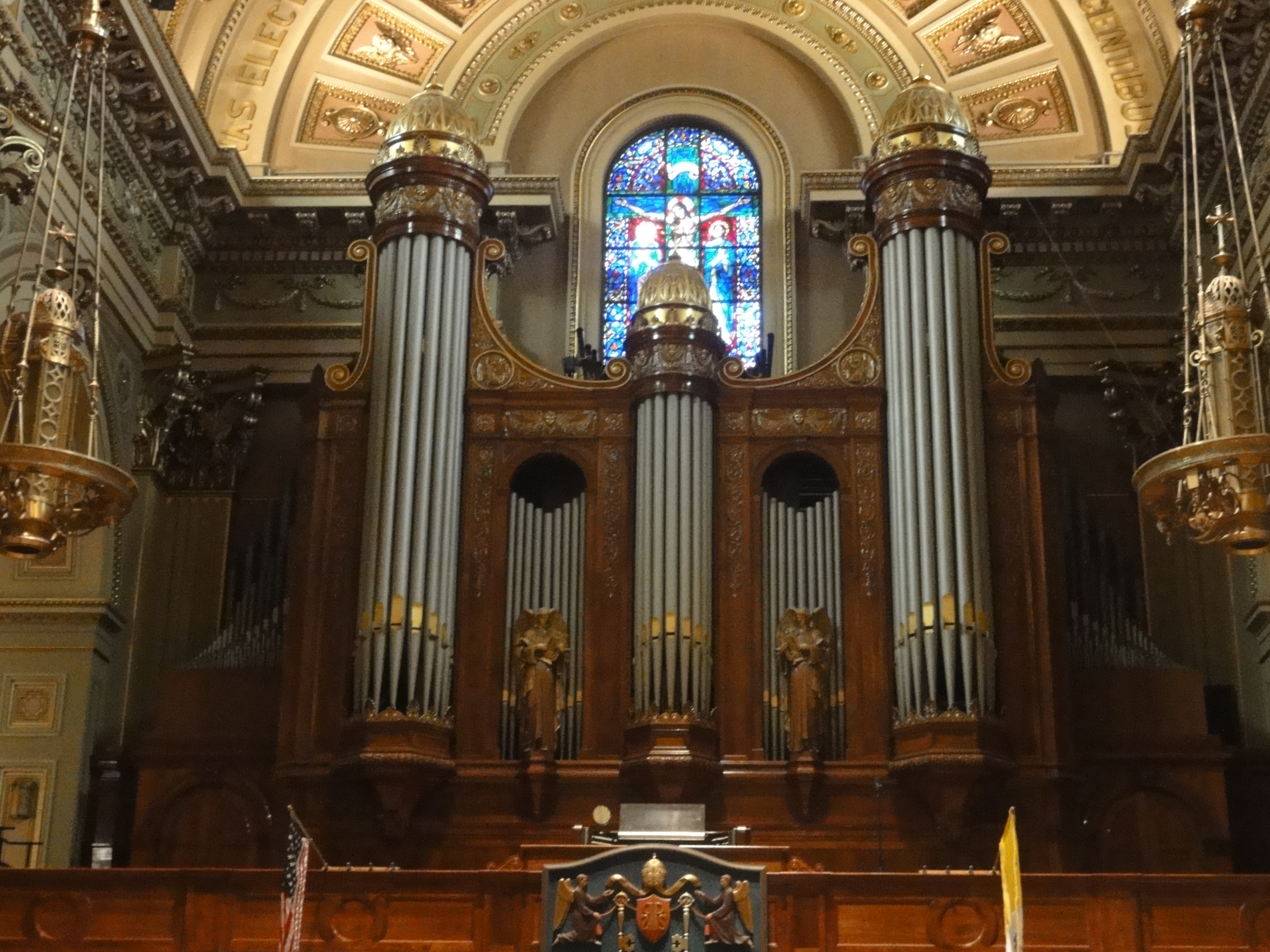
Basilica Opus organ (2011)

The crypt contains the remains of the following bishops and archbishops of Philadelphia:

- Michael Francis Egan, O.S.F., first bishop of Philadelphia, died in 1814
- Henry Conwell, second bishop, died in 1842
- James Frederick Wood, first archbishop, died in 1882
- Patrick John Ryan, second archbishop, died in 1911
- Edmond Prendergast, third archbishop, died in 1918
- Dennis Joseph Dougherty, fourth archbishop and first cardinal, died in 1951
- John Krol, sixth archbishop and third cardinal, died in 1996
- Anthony Joseph Bevilacqua, seventh archbishop and fourth cardinal, died in 2012

=== Other notables ===
The crypt also contains the remains of several cardinals, auxiliary bishops and priests with ties to the archdiocese. It is also the repository of Mother Katharine Drexel, a saint.

- Francis Patrick O'Neill, priest and pastor of St. James Parish in Philadelphia, died in 1882
- Maurice Walsh, priest and apostolic administrator in Philadelphia, died in 1888
- James Corcoran, monsignor and professor at Saint Charles Seminary, died in 1889
- James J. Carroll, bishop of Diocese of Nueva Segovia, died in 1913
- Francis J. Clark, priest and rector of the basilica, died in 1918
- Katharine Drexel, saint and founder of the Sisters of the Blessed Sacrament Founder. Died in 1955. Her remains were transferred to the basilica from St. Elizabeth's Convent in 2017.
- Cletus Joseph Benjamin, auxiliary bishop of Philadelphia, died in 1961
- Gerald P. O'Hara, bishop and apostolic delegate to Great Britain, died in 1963
- Francis Brennan, prefect of the Sacred Congregation for the Discipline of the Sacraments, sixth cardinal, died in 1968
- Gerald Vincent McDevitt, auxiliary bishop of Philadelphia, died in 1980
- John Patrick Foley, president of the Pontifical Council for Social Communications, seventh cardinal, died in 2011
- Martin Nicholas Lohmuller, auxiliary bishop of Philadelphia, died in 2017

== See also ==
- List of Catholic cathedrals in the United States
- List of cathedrals in the United States
- List of basilicas
- List of National Register of Historic Places entries
- Category:Burials at the Cathedral Basilica of Saints Peter and Paul (Philadelphia)
