= Claudio Maria Celli =

Italian Roman Catholic prelate

The Most Reverend Claudio Maria Celli
- President Emeritus of the Pontifical Council for Social Communications; President Emeritus of the Vatican Film Library
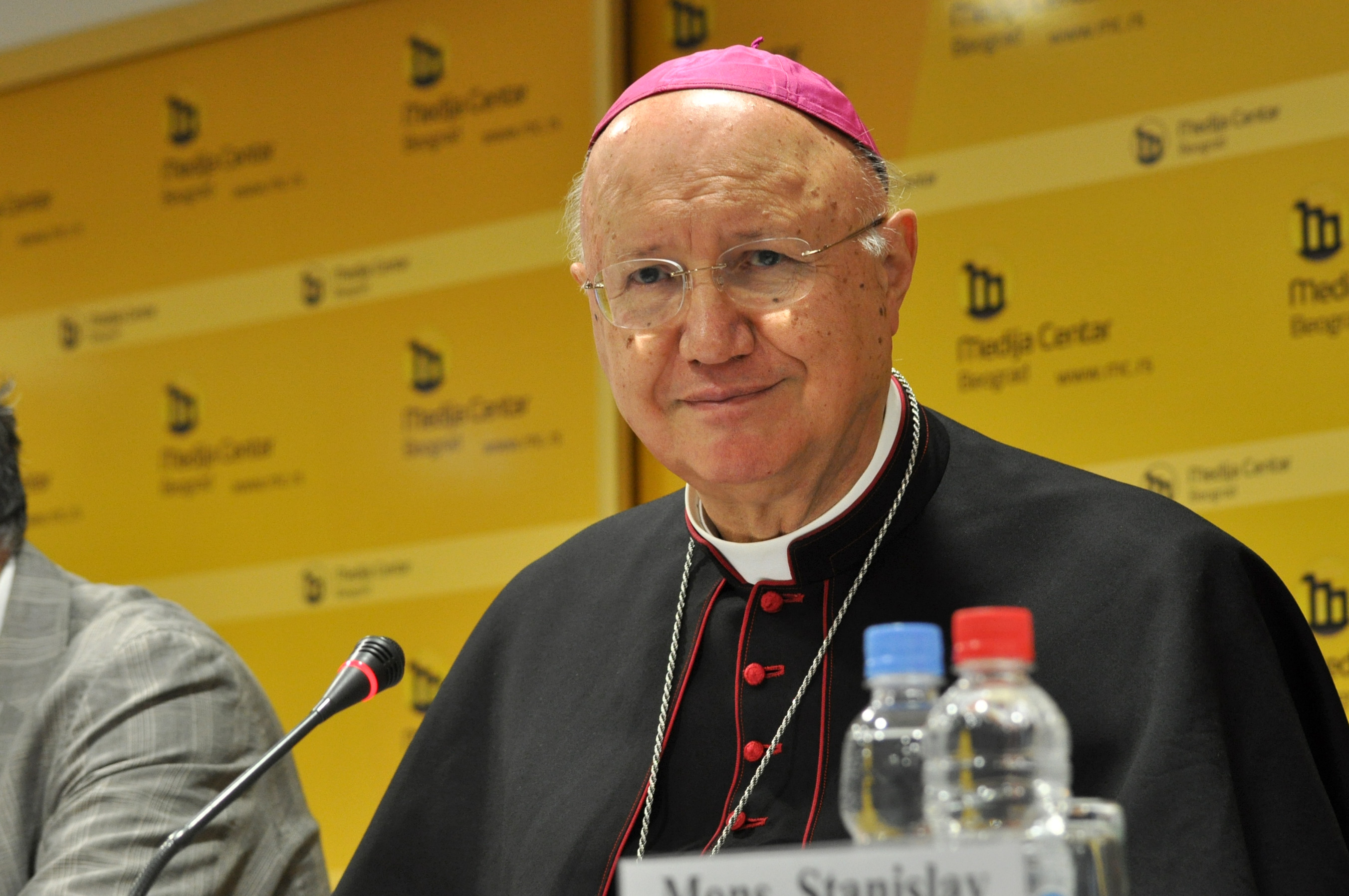
- Celli in 2013.
- Church: Roman Catholic Church
- Appointed: 27 June 2007
- Term ended: March 2016
- Predecessor: John Patrick Foley
- Other post: Titular Archbishop of Civitanova (1995–)
- Previous posts: Undersecretary for Relations with States (1990–95); Secretary of the Administration of the Patrimony of the Apostolic See (1995–2007); President of the Vatican Television Centre (2009–16)

Orders
- Ordination: 19 March 1965
- Consecration: 6 January 1996 by Pope John Paul II

Personal details
- Born: Claudio Maria Celli; 20 July 1941 (age 85) Rimini, Kingdom of Italy
- Education: Pontifical Ecclesiastical Academy; Pontifical Lateran University

Styles of Claudio Celli
- Reference style: The Most Reverend
- Spoken style: Your Excellency
- Religious style: Monsignor

Claudio Maria Celli (born 20 July 1941) is an Italian prelate of the Roman Catholic Church. An archbishop, Celli was President of the Pontifical Council for Social Communications from 2007 to 2016.

== Biography ==
Archbishop Celli was born in Rimini, and ordained to the priesthood on 19 March 1965. He graduated from the Pontifical Ecclesiastical Academy in 1966. In 1990, he became Undersecretary of the Relations with States (equivalent to foreign minister) section of the Vatican Secretariat of State.

On 16 December 1995, Celli was appointed Secretary of the Administration of the Patrimony of the Apostolic See and Titular Archbishop of Cluentum. He received his episcopal consecration on 6 January 1996 from Pope John Paul II, with Archbishops Giovanni Battista Re and Jorge María Mejía serving as co-consecrators.

Pope Benedict XVI named him President of the Pontifical Council for Social Communications on 27 June 2007.

He stated in January 2008 that Catholic media "should not become...instruments of a religious or cultural fundamentalism". He continued: "Our media is directed not just to Catholics, but to all men...they don't exist only for–or are directed only to–people who already belong to the Church, rather they should also give careful attention to what exists in the soul of man, in his heart, where sometimes there can be distance from God, or many times, a deep nostalgia for God."

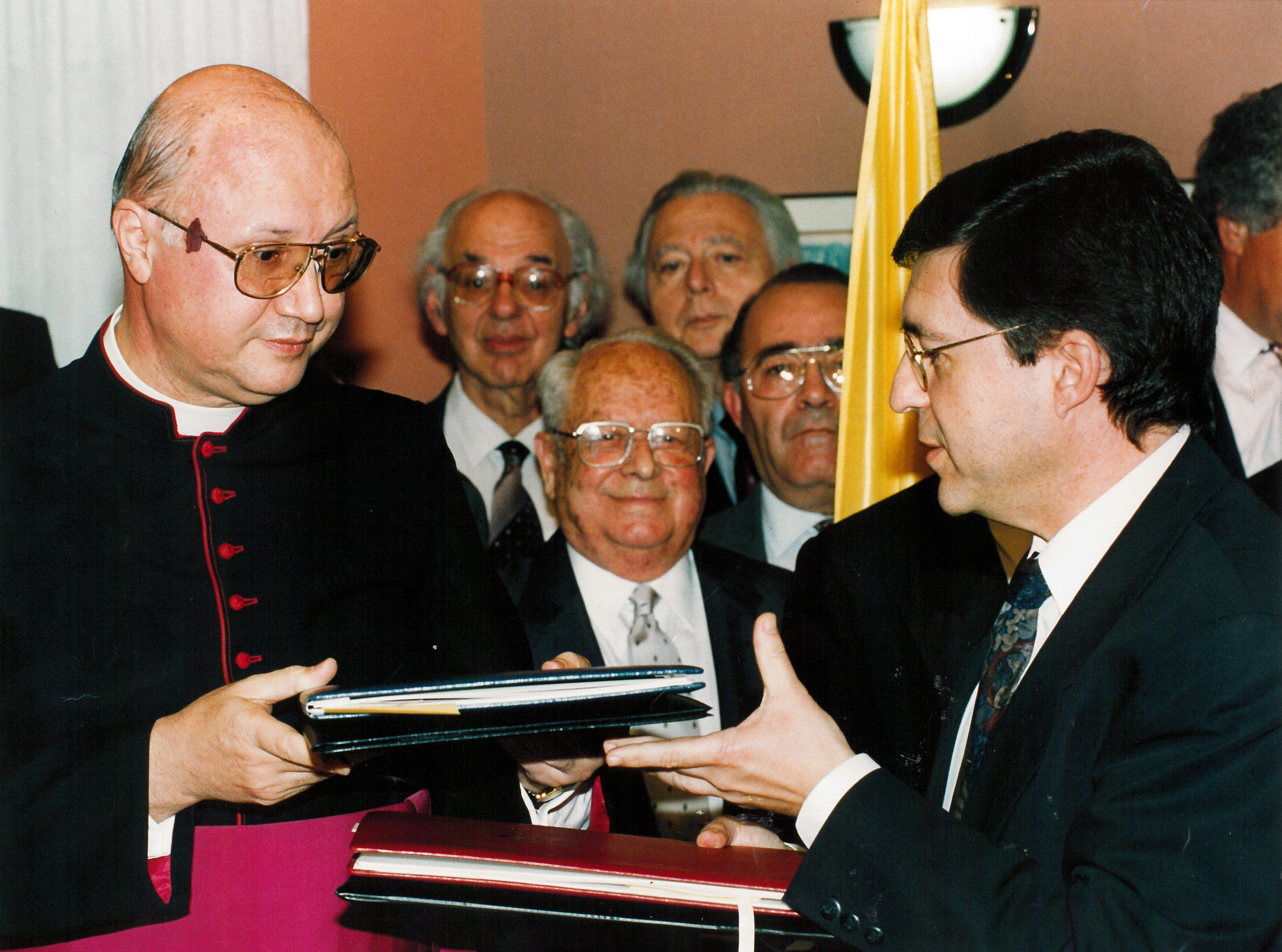
Formal establishment of diplomatic relations between the Holy See, represented by Monsignor Claudio Maria Celli (left), and Israel, represented by Deputy Foreign Minister Yossi Beilin, December 1993

In January 2009, he announced an agreement with Google to build a joint venture giving Benedict XVI his own YouTube channel.

On 5 January 2011 he was appointed one of the first members of the newly created Pontifical Council for the Promotion of the New Evangelisation. Marking the 2012 World Day of Communications, Archbishop Celli, speaking on Pope Benedict's message of silence said, "the topic chosen by the Holy Father for this World Day of Social Communications is attentive to today’s communicative phenomena and invites us all to reflect on this fundamental point: Silence is an integral part of communication. This is why, when we wish communication to be genuinely human -- because it begins from one man and is addressed to other men -- the word that is communicated must be nourished by silence to be more meaningful, to be more true. Because it is in silence that I hear, it is in silence that I understand more attentively what are the needs, the sufferings, the search for the good and true that is in the heart of other men".

In September 2014 he was appointed a member of the Congregation for the Evangelization of Peoples.

Catholic Church titles
Preceded by Jean-Louis Tauran	Undersecretary for Relations with States; 1 December 1990 – 16 December 1995	Succeeded by Celestino Migliore
Preceded by Giovanni Lajolo	Secretary of the Administration of the Patrimony of the Apostolic See; 16 December 1995 – 27 June 2007	Succeeded by Domenico Calcagno
Preceded by John Patrick Foley	President of the Pontifical Council for Social Communications; 27 June 2007 – March 2016	Succeeded by none, dicastary dissolved
