= The Catholic Standard & Times =

Newspaper

- Type: Catholic
- Founded: December 7, 1895; 130 years ago
- Ceased publication: July 2012
- City: Philadelphia
- Country: United States

The Catholic Standard & Times, published from 1895 to 2012, was the official newspaper of the Roman Catholic Archdiocese of Philadelphia.

It was the product of the merger of two earlier Catholic newspapers of Philadelphia. The Catholic Standard, the official organ of the Diocese of Philadelphia, was published by Wm. Pepper & Co. from January 6, 1866, to November 30, 1895. The Catholic Times ran from December 3, 1892, to November 23, 1895.

The Catholic Standard & Times published its first issue on December 7, 1895. Until its last few years, it published 50 times per year, except the week of July 4 and the last week of the year. It won numerous press awards from the Philadelphia Press Association and the Catholic Press Association and was a member of the latter.

The newspaper received no funding from the archdiocese; revenues came from advertising and parish and home subscriptions. In 2007, declining revenue led the paper to begin to cut costs. In 2011, it moved to a monthly schedule. It was discontinued in July 2012.

Although the physical newspaper is no longer in publication, the website CatholicPhilly.com remains active and is the official news website of the archdiocese.

== See also ==
- John Patrick Foley (former editor)
