= Argyropolis (Thrace) =

Town of ancient Thrace

Coordinates: 41°01′35″N 28°58′49″E

Argyropolis (Greek: Αργυρούπολις) or Bytharion (Βυθαρίον) was a town of ancient Thrace, inhabited during Byzantine times.

Its site is located near Tophane in European Turkey.
