= Gerald Vincent McDevitt =

American Catholic bishop (1917–1980)

Styles of Gerald Vincent McDevitt
- Reference style: The Most Reverend
- Spoken style: Your Excellency
- Religious style: Monsignor
- Posthumous style: none

Gerald Vincent McDevitt (February 23, 1917 – September 29, 1980) was an American prelate of the Roman Catholic Church. He served as an auxiliary bishop of the Archdiocese of Philadelphia from 1962 until his death in 1980.

== Biography ==
Gerald McDevitt was born in Philadelphia, Pennsylvania, one of seven children of Hugh J. and Helen (née Boylan) McDevitt. He received his early education at the parochial school of Our Mother of Sorrows Church in his native city. He attended La Salle College High School in Wyndmoor before beginning his studies for the priesthood at St. Charles Borromeo Seminary in Overbrook. In 1938, he was sent to continue his studies at the Pontifical Roman Seminary in Rome, but his studies were interrupted two years later by World War II. He returned to the United States, where he was ordained a priest by Cardinal Dennis Joseph Dougherty on May 30, 1942.

He studied at the Catholic University of America in Washington, D.C., where he earned a doctorate in canon law in 1945. Following his return to Pennsylvania, he taught at St. James High School in Chester (1945–47) and at St. Thomas More High School in Philadelphia (1947–52). From 1952 to 1962, he served as secretary at the Apostolic Delegation in Washington, D.C.

On June 22, 1962, McDevitt was appointed auxiliary bishop of the Archdiocese of Philadelphia and titular bishop of Tigias by Pope John XXIII. He received his episcopal consecration on the following August 1 from Archbishop Egidio Vagnozzi, with Bishops Joseph Carroll McCormick and Francis James Furey serving as co-consecrators, at the Cathedral of SS. Peter and Paul.

He attended all four sessions of the Second Vatican Council between 1962 and 1965, serving as a member of the Religious Commission. Regarded as a conservative, he was a strong opponent of the ordination of women, divorce, and abortion.

McDevitt died at age 63.

Catholic Church titles
Preceded by –	Auxiliary Bishop of Philadelphia; 1962–1980	Succeeded by –
