= Canon Law Society of America =

US professional association

- Logo of the Canon Law Society of America
- Formation: November 12, 1939
- Type: Professional Society
- Headquarters: Washington, DC
- Location: United States
- President: Very Rev. Kenneth A. Riley, JCL
- Website: www.clsa.org

The Canon Law Society of America or CLSA is a professional association dedicated to the promotion of both the study and the application of canon law in the Catholic Church. The Society's membership includes over 1500 people who reside in 43 countries. Not all members are Catholic.

== History ==
A group of canonists established the Canon Law Society of America on November 12, 1939, in Washington, D.C., as a professional association, dedicated to the promotion of both the study and the application of canon law in the Catholic Church. The Society remains active in study and the promotion of canonical and pastoral approaches to significant issues within the Catholic Church, both the Latin or Roman Catholic Church and the Eastern Catholic Churches. Since its founding, and especially since Pope John XXIII called for the revision of the first Code of Canon Law of 1917, the Society has offered its services in the United States for the revitalization and proper application of church law. On February 13, 1981, the Society incorporated as a non-profit corporation in the District of Columbia.

== Structure ==
=== Board of Governors ===
The Society organizes its activities through an annual general meeting, at which time it elects officers and determines resolutions for future study and activity by the Society. A "Board of Governors" oversees the operations of the Society. The Board is composed of elected officers: a president, a vice-president who is president-elect, an immediate past president, a secretary, a treasurer, and six consultors.

== Activities ==
The Society convenes an annual convention and other symposia. Collaboration with other professional church organizations and learned societies is another area of the Society's involvements. Regional meetings of members of the Society also are held periodically across the United States.

The Society publishes various works in order to promote greater understanding and application of canon law.

== See also ==
- Canon law of the Catholic Church
- 1983 Code of Canon Law
- Code of Canons of the Eastern Churches
- Professional society
- The Jurist
- Law society
- Bar association
