= Phil Stambaugh =

American football player and coach (born 1978)

Notre Dame HS (PA)
- Title: Head coach

Personal information
- Born: August 10, 1978 (age 48); Roseto, Pennsylvania, U.S.
- Listed height: 6 ft 3 in (1.91 m)
- Listed weight: 218 lb (99 kg)

Career information
- Position: Quarterback
- High school: Pius X (Bangor, Pennsylvania)
- College: Lehigh (1996–1999)
- NFL draft: 2000: undrafted

Career history

Playing
- Buffalo Bills (2000)*; New Orleans Saints (2001)*; Rhein Fire (2001); Jacksonville Jaguars (2001); New Haven Ninjas (2002); New York Giants (2002)*; Pittsburgh Steelers (2003)*; Berlin Thunder (2003); Philadelphia Eagles (2004)*
- * Offseason or practice squad member only

Coaching
- Pius X HS (PA) (2000–2002) Quarterbacks coach; Pius X HS (PA) (2003–2009) Offensive coordinator, special teams coordinator, assistant head coach, & quarterbacks coach; Pius X HS (PA) (2010–2014) Head coach; Notre Dame HS (PA) (2015) Offensive coordinator, special teams coordinator, assistant head coach, & quarterbacks coach; Notre Dame HS (PA) (2016–present) Head coach, offensive coordinator, special teams coordinator, & quarterbacks coach

Awards and highlights
- ECAC All-Star Team (1998, 1999); Patriot League Offensive Player of the Year (1998); First Team All-Patriot League (1998); Second Team All-Patriot League (1997)

Career NFL Europe statistics
- Passing attempts: 454
- Passing completions: 279
- Completion percentage: 61.5
- TD–INT: 15–13
- Passing yards: 2,925
- Passer rating: 79.2

Head coaching record
- Career: 121-44 (high school)

Philip Michael Stambaugh (born August 10, 1978) is an American football coach and former quarterback. He is the current head coach for Notre Dame High School in Easton, Pennsylvania. He played college football for the Lehigh Mountain Hawks. After going undrafted in the 2000 NFL draft, he signed with the Buffalo Bills of the National Football League (NFL). He also had stints with the New Orleans Saints, Jacksonville Jaguars, New York Giants, Pittsburgh Steelers, and Philadelphia Eagles, alongside stints with the Rhein Fire and Berlin Thunder of NFL Europe, and the New Haven Ninjas of af2. He previously coached at his alma mater, Pius X High School.

== Early life ==
Stambaugh was born on August 10, 1978, in Roseto, Pennsylvania. He played high school football for Pius X High School in Bangor, Pennsylvania. In three years with the school, he passed for 5,595 yards and 52 touchdowns. He committed to play college football for Lehigh.

== College career ==
As a freshman at Lehigh University in 1996, Stambaugh earned the starting position with four games remaining in the season due to the starting quarterback quitting and the backup becoming injured. He his only four starts of the season, he completed nearly 55% of his passes for 967 yards and eight touchdowns. He led a thirteen-point comeback against Lafayette as he rallied back from down 6–19 to win 23–19. He earned the rivalry's MVP trophy while becoming the first freshman to do so.

As a sophomore in 1997, Stambaugh threw for 2,586 yards and 23 touchdowns. He earned Second Team All-Patriot League honors following the season. He led the Patriot League in passing and total offense while winning his second-straight rivalry game over Lafayette.

As a junior in 1998, was named Patriot League Offensive Player of the Year while also earning an ECAC All-Star nod. He completed 66% of his passes for 3,121 yards and 22 touchdowns. He led the team to an undefeated regular season and finished ranked seventh nationally.

As a senior in 1999, he was voted team captain. He led the school to a ten-win season and their second-consecutive Patriot League title along with an appearance in the Division I-AA playoffs. During the season he completed a career-best 68% of his passes and threw for 2,995 yards and 26 touchdowns. During the season he was named as a finalist for the Walter Payton Award.

=== Statistics ===
Year	Team	Games		Passing							
Year	Team	GP	Record	Comp	Att	Pct	Yards	Avg	TD	Int	Rate
1996	Lehigh	4	2–2	93	170	54.7	967	5.7	7	8	106.7
1997	Lehigh	11	4–7	243	396	61.4	2,586	6.5	23	10	130.3
1998	Lehigh	13	12–1	298	451	66.1	3,804	8.4	23	12	148.4
1999	Lehigh	12	10–2	249	358	69.6	2,995	8.4	27	11	158.6
Career		40	28−12	883	1,375	62.3	10,352	7.2	80	41	134.9

== Professional career ==
After going undrafted in the 2000 NFL draft, Stambaugh signed with the Buffalo Bills of the National Football League (NFL). He was released during the first set of roster cuts prior to the team's final preseason game.

In 2001, Stambaugh signed with the New Orleans Saints.

In 2001, Stambaugh was allocated to the Rhein Fire of NFL Europe.

In 2001, Stambaugh signed with the Jacksonville Jaguars.

In 2002, Stambaugh played for the New Haven Ninjas of af2. He suffered an injury in his non-throwing shoulder during a game.

On May 31, 2002, Stambaugh signed with the New York Giants. He was released on the opening day of training camp.

In 2003, Stambaugh signed with the Berlin Thunder. With the Thunder he led the league in completion percentage with 66.5%.

In 2003, Stambaugh signed with the Pittsburgh Steelers. On August 23, 2003, he was released.

On May 26, 2004, Stambaugh signed with the Philadelphia Eagles. Following the signing of former Pro Bowl quarterback Jeff Blake, he was released.

== Coaching career ==
While still playing professionally, Stambaugh helped coach at his alma mater, Pius X High School, as the school's quarterback coach. In 2003, he was promoted to offensive coordinator, special teams coordinator, assistant head coach, and quarterbacks coach.

Following the 2009 season, Stambaugh was promoted to head coach. He held the position until the school closed in 2014.

After Pius X closed, he was hired by Notre Dame High School as the team's offensive coordinator. After one season he was promoted to head coach.

== Head coaching record ==
Year	Team	Overall	Conference	Standing	Bowl/playoffs
Pius X Royals () (2010–2014)
2010	Pius X	8–4	5–0	1st	DXI
2011	Pius X	12–2	4–0	1st	DXI - PIAA
2012	Pius X	6–5	4–0	1st	
2013	Pius X	6–5	4–0	1st	DXI
2014	Pius X	11–3	3–0	1st	DXI - PIAA
Pius X:		43–19	20–0		
Notre Dame Crusaders () (2016–present)
2016	Notre Dame	12–3	8–2	T–2nd	DXI - PIAA
2017	Notre Dame	9–3	8–2	3rd	DXI
2018	Notre Dame	10–2	9–1	1st	DXI
2019	Notre Dame	7–4	7–3	3rd	DXI
2020	Notre Dame	7–1	4–0	T–1st	DXI
2021	Notre Dame	7–3	7–2	T–7th	DXI
2022	Notre Dame	9–3	5–1	3rd	DXI
2023	Notre Dame	8–4	5–2	3rd	DXI
Notre Dame:		69–23	53-13		
Total:		112–42			
National championship Conference title Conference division title or championship game berth
