= David B. Thompson =

American prelate

His Excellency, The Most Reverend David Bernard Thompson
- Archbishop of Atlanta
- Church: Roman Catholic Church
- See: Archdiocese of Atlanta
- In office: 1990 to 1999
- Predecessor: Ernest Leo Unterkoefler

Orders
- Ordination: May 27, 1950 by Joseph McCormick
- Consecration: May 24, 1989 by Pio Laghi, Norbert Felix Gaughan and Eugene Antonio Marino

Personal details
- Born: May 29, 1923 Philadelphia, Pennsylvania, U.S.
- Died: November 24, 2013 (aged 90) Charleston, South Carolina, U.S.
- Education: St. Charles Borromeo Seminary; Catholic University of America; Villanova University
- Motto: Christi impetus pacis (Working for the peace of Christ)

Styles of David Thompson
- Reference style: The Most Reverend
- Spoken style: Your Excellency
- Religious style: Bishop

David Bernard Thompson (May 29, 1923 − November 24, 2013) was an American Catholic prelate who served as bishop of Charleston in South Carolina from 1990 to 1999.

== Biography ==
=== Early life and education ===
Thompson was born on May 29, 1923, in Philadelphia, Pennsylvania. His twin brother, Edward Thompson, became a priest also. He attended West Philadelphia Catholic High School for Boys in Philadelphia. After graduating in 1941, Thompson entered St. Charles Borromeo Seminary in Wynnewood, Pennsylvania, to prepare for the priesthood. He finished at St. Charles with a Bachelor of Arts degree and a Master of Arts degree in history.

=== Priesthood ===
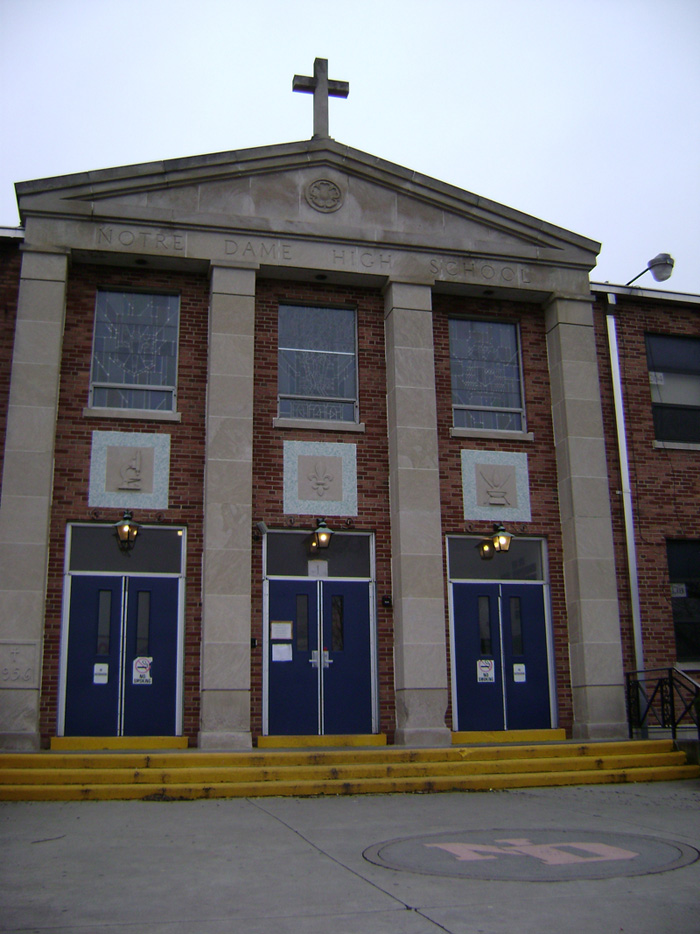
Notre Dame High School, Easton, Pennsylvania (2009)

Thompson was ordained to the priesthood for the Archdiocese of Philadelphia on May 27, 1950, by Bishop Joseph McCormick. That same year, he moved to Washington D.C. to study at the Catholic University of America (CUA). He received a Licentiate of Canon Law from the CUA School of Canon Law.

After returning to Philadelphia in 1952, the archdiocese assigned him as a teacher and guidance counselor at St. Thomas More High School. He also took coursework at Villanova University in Philadelphia at that time. In 1957, he was named as the founding principal for Notre Dame High School in Easton, Pennsylvania.

That same year Thompson established a dance show at Notre Dame based on the popular television show American Bandstand. The Notre Dame Bandstand show featured performers such as Paul Anka, Fabian, Connie Francis and Herman's Hermits. Thompson gained the name "Father Bandstand".

When the Vatican erected the Diocese of Allentown in 1961, Thompson was incardinated, or transferred, to the new diocese. He was named as the first chancellor of Allentown. The Vatican in 1963 elevated Thompson to the rank of domestic prelate and in 1966 Bishop Joseph McShea appointed him as vicar general.

=== Coadjutor Bishop and Bishop of Charleston ===
On April 22, 1989, Thompson was appointed coadjutor bishop of Charleston by Pope John Paul II. He received his episcopal consecration on May 24, 1989, from Archbishop Pio Laghi, with Bishop Norbert Gaughan and Archbishop Eugene Marino serving as co-consecrators. Thompson assumed as his episcopal motto: Christi impetus pacis, meaning, "Working for the peace of Christ."

Thompson automatically succeeded Bishop Ernest Unterkoefler as the eleventh bishop of Charleston upon the latter's resignation on February 22, 1990. Thompson's tenure was marked by the Synod of Charleston, which lasted from 1992 to 1995; it was the first diocesan synod held there since 1958.

=== Death and legacy ===
Thompson resigned as bishop of Charleston on July 12, 1999. He died in Charleston on November 24, 2013, at the age of 90.

In 2024, Thompson, who served as bishop of Charleston from February 1990 to July 1999, was named in a lawsuit as someone who allegedly covered up sexual abuse committed by Reverend Robert Kelly. He had served as a pastor at St. Andrew Parish in Myrtle Beach, South Carolina, from 1990 to 1994.

== Awards ==
- Tree of Life award from the Jewish National Fund
- Order of the Palmetto award from the State of South Carolina

Catholic Church titles
Preceded by Ernest Leo Unterkoefler	Bishop of Charleston; 1990–1999	Succeeded by Robert Joseph Baker
Preceded by –	Coadjutor Bishop of Charleston; 1989–1990	Succeeded by –
