= Pius X High School =

Pius X High School can refer to:

- St. Pius X Catholic High School (DeKalb County, Georgia)
- Pius X High School (Nebraska) in Lincoln, Nebraska
- Pius X High School (Pennsylvania) in Bangor, Pennsylvania
- Pius X High School (Downey, California) formerly in Downey, California
