= Alfred A. Schlert =

American prelate of the Catholic Church (born 1961)

His Excellency, The Most Reverend Alfred Andrew Schlert
- Bishop of Allentown
- Archdiocese: Philadelphia
- Diocese: Allentown
- Appointed: June 27, 2017
- Installed: August 31, 2017
- Predecessor: John Barres

Orders
- Ordination: September 19, 1987 by Thomas Jerome Welsh
- Consecration: August 31, 2017 by Charles J. Chaput, Edward Cullen, and John Oliver Barres

Personal details
- Born: July 24, 1961 (age 64) Easton, Pennsylvania, U.S.
- Education: St. Charles Borromeo Seminary; Pontifical Lateran University
- Motto: Pasce oves meas (Feed my sheep)

Styles of Alfred Andrew Schlert
- Reference style: His Excellency; The Most Reverend
- Spoken style: Your Excellency
- Religious style: Bishop

Alfred Andrew Schlert (born July 24, 1961) is an American prelate of the Roman Catholic Church who has served as the bishop of the Diocese of Allentown in Pennsylvania since 2017.

== Early life and education ==
Alfred Schlert was born on July 24, 1961, in Easton, Pennsylvania, the son of Alfred and Marylou Schlert. He attended St. Jane Frances de Chantal Elementary School and Notre Dame High School, both in Easton.

After deciding to become a priest, Schlert entered St. Charles Borromeo Seminary in Wynnewood, Pennsylvania. After finishing at St. Charles, he went to Rome to reside at the Pontifical Roman Major Seminary while studying at the Pontifical Lateran University.

== Priesthood ==
Schlert was ordained a priest for the Diocese of Allentown on September 19, 1987, at the Cathedral of Saint Catharine of Siena in Allentown, Pennsylvania, by Bishop Thomas J. Welsh. The diocese assigned Schlert as an assistant pastor at St. Francis of Assisi Parish in Allentown. He was also placed on the faculty at Notre Dame High School and as a chaplain at Lehigh University in Bethlehem, Pennsylvania.

A few years later, Schlert returned to Rome to complete his graduate studies at the Lateran University, where he received a Licentiate in Canon Law in 1992. In 1997, Welsh appointed Schlert as his priest-secretary and as vice chancellor of the diocese. In 1998, Bishop Edward P. Cullen named Schlert as vicar general. Pope John Paul II named him Chaplain of His Holiness in 1999.

Pope Benedict XVI named Schlert a prelate of honor in 2005. In addition to his administrative responsibilities, the diocese assigned Schlert as pastor of St. Theresa of the Child Jesus Parish in Hellertown, Pennsylvania, in 2008.

== Bishop of Allentown ==
Pope Francis appointed Schlert as bishop of Allentown on June 27, 2017. His consecration by Archbishop Charles Chaput took place at the Cathedral of Saint Catharine of Siena on August 31, 2017, with Bishops Edward Cullen and John Barres serving as co-consecrators.

In a grand jury report released by Pennsylvania Attorney General Josh Shapiro on August 14, 2018. Lehigh Valley Live noted:

Excerpts from the report depict Schlert as someone quick to confront priests who were the subject of abuse complaints. He, along with a fellow monsignor, helped facilitate several resignations and retirements from priests suspected of sexually abusing children. His inquiry with one accused priest triggered the process of that priest being laicized, or defrocked.

According to the grand jury report, Monsignor William Jones was accused of sexually abusing a boy. Two days after the boy reported the abuse, Schlert and Monsignor John B. McCann confronted Jones who "offered his resignation and was advised he could not exercise any public ministry in the diocese or elsewhere." The report also stated that in 2007 the diocese heard about a boy who was allegedly given alcohol and inappropriately touched by Reverend Joseph Galko. Monsignor Gerald Gobitas and Schlert confronted Galko, who admitted the allegation. Galko was laicized.

In August 2018, Schlert issued a public apology "for the past sins and crimes committed by some members of the clergy." Schlert and the diocese were sued in November 2018 by a man who said he was sexually abused as an altar boy by Reverend Bruno Tucci. He allegedly groped the boy on different occasions at Our Lady of Mount Carmel Church in Nesquehoning, Pennsylvania, between 1999 and 2001.

== See also ==
- Catholic Church hierarchy
- Catholic Church in the United States
- Historical list of the Catholic bishops of the United States
- List of Catholic bishops of the United States
- Lists of patriarchs, archbishops, and bishops

Catholic Church titles
| Preceded by John Barres | Bishop of Allentown; 2017–present | Succeeded by Incumbent |
