= 2013 FEU Tamaraws basketball team =

2013 FEU Tamaraws men's basketball season
Coaches
Head coach	Nash Racela
Assistant coaches	Johnny Abarrientos
	Gilbert Lao
	Johnny de Guia
Team Staff
Manager	Anton Montinola
Athletic director	Mark Molina
History
UAAP record	10-4
UAAP Final Four	Lost to DLSU, 68-71 (Eliminated)
Post-season finish	3rd place, bronze medalist(s)
Season
2012	2014

The 2013 FEU Tamaraws men's basketball team represented Far Eastern University during the 76th season of the UAAP men's basketball tournament that began on June 29, 2013. The Tamaraws finished the eliminations with a 10-4 record and placed third in the tournament after losing to DLSU in the semifinals.

== Preseason results ==
Date	Score	High points	High assist	High rebounds	Venue	Record
April 20	68-67 vsAdU	Romeo (21)	Inigo (3)	Hargrove (7)	San Juan Arena	0-1
April 27	88-81 vsUPHSD	Romeo (21)	Tolomia (5)	Cruz (9)	San Juan Arena	1-1
May 1	64-67 vsNU	Romeo (25)	4 tied (2)	Cruz (12)	San Juan Arena	1-2
May 8	81-79 vsAU	Tolomia (18)	Garcia (4)	2 tied (6)	San Juan Arena	2-2
May 11	71-66 vsUP	Tolomia (15)	Tolomia (4)	Belo (16)	San Juan Arena	3-2
May 18	80-76 vsSBC	Garcia (23)	Garcia (4)	Belo (7)	San Juan Arena	3-3
May 24	81-74 vsCSB	Hargrove (18)	2 tied (4)	Hargrove (9)	San Juan Arena	3-4
May 31	70-73 vsJRU	Hargrove (16)	Tolomia (9)	Cruz (16)	San Juan Arena	4-4

== Notable games ==
=== UE Red Warriors ===
The Tamaraws played the season opener facing the Battle of the East rival and the much favored preseason Filoil champions UE Red Warriors. The Tams found themselves trailing 21-11 at the end of the first quarter. The Warriors were mostly leading by double digits the entire first half until the Tams were able to claw their way back to cut the lead down to a single digit in the final 2 minute frame of the second quarter, 32-37. FEU started the second half on a 10-3 run to take advantage of the Warriors 42-40 in the first three minutes of the third quarter, only to end the momentum with Garcia committing an unsportsmanlike foul that gave the Warriors their own 7-0 surge to regain the lead 42-47. FEU scored the last six points to lead the Warriors 61-54 to end the third. FEU led as much as 15 in the fourth and went on to win the game, 89-78, their seventh straight win against the Warriors.

=== ADMU Blue Eagles ===
Leading by as much as 11 points in the fourth quarter, the Eagles came back with a 14-2 run to gain the lead, 58-57. FEU then scored three straight baskets for a 59-64 lead with over two minutes in the fourth but Elorde made a quick three to pull within two, 62-64. The game were tied at 66 with 10 seconds left in the game and eventually went to overtime after a Garcia miss. The Tams outscored the Eagles, 13-9 in overtime to get the win, 79-75, ending their six-game losing streak to the Eagles. Romeo scored six of the Tams' last eight points in the extra period.

Terrence Romeo was named the first Press Corps Player of the Week of the season averaging 21 points, 5.3 assists and two steals per game in wins over UE, Ateneo and UP.

=== Battle of the East, Round 2 ===
Though FEU led almost the entire game with as much as 17, the Roi Sumang-led Red Warriors came back late in the fourth quarter taking advantage of FEU's lackluster defense and poor free throw shooting to tie the game at 70. The game went to overtime and the Warriors were in control in the extra period with a seven-point lead with 28 seconds in left, but was not able to cap off the win as they let the Tams score five straight points with Romeo completing a coast to coast finish and Mendoza stealing an inbound pass off of UE's Santos for a three-point marker putting the Tams within striking distance, 84-82. Sumang was fouled and missed one of his free throws with 13 seconds left, giving FEU the chance to tie the game only being down by three, 85-82. Tolomia hit the three pointer after faking a hand-off pass to Romeo and sends the game to its second overtime. The Tams showed dominance into the second overtime with a 98-94 win, snapping their two-game losing skid. The Warriors lost eight straight games to the Tamaraws.

== Eliminations ==
Date	Score	High points	High assist	High rebounds	Venue	Record
Round 1
June 29	89-78 vsUE	Romeo (23)	Romeo (12)	Romeo (9)	Mall Of Asia Arena	1-0
July 3	79-75* vsADMU	Romeo (21)	Romeo (3)	Romeo (9)	Mall Of Asia Arena	2-0
July 7	75-57 vsUP	Romeo (20)	2 tied (4)	Romeo (12)	Mall Of Asia Arena	3-0
July 13	83-79 vsDLSU	Romeo (25)	Romeo (5)	Belo (13)	Mall Of Asia Arena	4-0
July 17	87-83 vsNU	Romeo (24)	Tolomia (6)	Tolomia (7)	Mall Of Asia Arena	5-0
July 21	77-67 vsUST	Romeo (19)	Tolomia (7)	Belo (9)	Mall Of Asia Arena	6-0
July 28	74-71 vsAdU	Romeo (26)	Tolomia (4)	2 tied (5)	Smart Araneta Coliseum	7-0
Round 2
August 14	58-59 vsNU	Garcia (20)	Romeo (3)	Pogoy (9)	Smart Araneta Coliseum	7-1
August 18	75-66 vsDLSU	2 tied (16)	Tolomia (4)	Pogoy (9)	Mall Of Asia Arena	7-2
August 25	98-94 2OT vsUE	Romeo (30)	2 tied (6)	Mendoza (13)	Smart Araneta Coliseum	8-2
August 28	73-92 vsADMU	Romeo (19)	4 tied (2)	Belo (8)	Smart Araneta Coliseum	8-3
September 1	78-79 vsUST 2OT	Romeo (19)	Romeo (6)	Belo (14)	Mall Of Asia Arena	8-4
September 7	92-80 vsAdU	Romeo (32)	Garcia (6)	Belo (14)	Mall Of Asia Arena	9-4
September 11	87-63 vsUP	Romeo (33)	2 tied (5)	2 tied (9)	Mall Of Asia Arena	10-4
Postseason
September 21	69-74 vsDLSU	Romeo (22)	3 tied (3)	Garcia (6)	Mall Of Asia Arena	10-4
September 25	68-71 vsDLSU	Cruz (16)	Romeo (7)	Pogoy (9)	Mall Of Asia Arena	10-4
Source: pba-online.net
