= John Barres =

American prelate (born 1960)

His Excellency, The Most Reverend John Oliver Barres
- Bishop of Rockville Centre
- Diocese: Rockville Centre
- Appointed: December 9, 2016
- Installed: January 31, 2017
- Predecessor: William Murphy
- Previous post: Bishop of Allentown (2009–2017)

Orders
- Ordination: October 21, 1989 by Robert Edward Mulvee
- Consecration: July 30, 2009 by Justin Francis Rigali, William Francis Malooly, and Michael Angelo Saltarelli

Personal details
- Born: September 20, 1960 (age 66) Larchmont, New York, U.S.
- Denomination: Roman Catholic
- Education: Princeton University; New York University; Catholic University of America; Pontifical University of the Holy Cross
- Motto: Holiness and mission

Styles of John Oliver Barres
- Reference style: His Excellency; The Most Reverend
- Spoken style: Your Excellency
- Religious style: Bishop

John Oliver Barres (/ˈbærɪs/ BARR-iss; born September 20, 1960) is an American Catholic prelate who has served as bishop of Rockville Centre in New York since 2017. He previously served as bishop of Allentown in Pennsylvania from 2009 to 2017.

== Early life and education ==
Barres was born on September 20, 1960, the fifth of six children, to Oliver and Marjorie (née Catchpole) Barres, in Larchmont, New York. His parents were Congregationalist ministers who converted to Catholicism in 1955. John Barres was baptized by Archbishop Fulton J. Sheen. For high school, Barres attended Phillips Academy in Andover, Massachusetts.

After graduating from Phillips in 1978, Barres entered Princeton University in Princeton, New Jersey, obtaining a Bachelor of Arts degree in English in 1982. He then entered the New York University Stern School of Business in New York City, earning in 1984 a Master of Business Administration degree in management.

Having decided to become a priest, Barres moved to Washington D.C. to enter the Theological College at the Catholic University of American. He received a Bachelor of Sacred Theology degree in 1988, and a Licentiate in Systematic Theology in 1989.

== Priesthood ==
Barres was ordained to the priesthood for the Diocese of Wilmington by Bishop Robert Mulvee on October 21, 1989 at Saint Elizabeth Church in Wilmington, Delaware. After his 1989 ordination, the diocese assigned Barres as an associate pastor at Holy Family Parish in Newark, Delaware. In 1991, Barres joined the Priestly Society of the Holy Cross, run by Opus Dei. He was transferred in 1992 to St. Elizabeth Parish in Wilmington to serve as associate pastor there.

Barres went to Rome in 1996 to attend the Pontifical University of the Holy Cross, where he earned a Licentiate of Canon Law in 1998 and a Doctor of Spirituality degree in 1999. Barres' doctoral thesis was entitled "Jean-Jacques Olier's Priestly Spirituality: Mental Prayer and Virtue as the Foundation for the Direction of Souls."

After his return to Delaware in 1999, Bishop Michael Saltarelli named Barres as vice chancellor for the diocese. In 2000, he was named chancellor. That same year, the Vatican elevated Barres to the rank of chaplain to his holiness by the Vatican. In 2005, the Vatican named Barres as an honorary prelate. In addition to his duties as chancellor, Barres briefly became pastor of Holy Child Parish in Wilmington in May 2009.

Barres served on the following boards while in Delaware:

- Maryland Catholic Conference
- St. Francis Hospital in Wilmington
- Cathedral Foundation

=== Bishop of Allentown ===
Coat of arms for Barres as bishop of Allentown

On May 27, 2009, Barres was appointed the fourth bishop of Allentown by Pope Benedict XVI, succeeding Bishop Edward Cullen. Barres received his episcopal consecration on July 30, 2009, at the Cathedral of Saint Catharine of Siena in Allentown, Pennsylvania. Cardinal Justin Rigali was the principal consecrator, with Bishop W. Francis Malooly and Bishop Emeritus Michael Saltarelli as principal co-consecrators.

Barres was the first diocesan bishop of Allentown who had not served previously in the Archdiocese of Philadelphia. Barres established the Saint Thomas More Society for lawyers in the diocese and expanded the diocese's Hispanic ministry and evangelization.

=== Bishop of Rockville Centre ===
Pope Francis appointed Barres as bishop of Rockville Centre on December 9, 2016. He was installed on January 31, 2017, at the Cathedral of Saint Agnes in Rockville Centre.

In October 2017, Barres announced the creation of the Independent Reconciliation and Compensation Program (IRCP) for survivors of acts of child sexual abuse committed by clergy in the diocese. Barres serves on the Committee on Evangelization and Catechesis of the United States Conference of Catholic Bishops (USCCB). In 2017, Barres created with Telecare, the diocesan television network, a video series targeted to commuters, entitled The Catholic Spirituality of Commuter Delays.

In August 2018, a Pennsylvania grand jury report criticized Barres for failing to remove a priest from the ministry after credible allegations of sexual misconduct while he was bishop in Allentown. The priest, Michael Lawrence, had admitted to sexually abusing a 12-year-old boy in 1982, had previously been sent to a monitored rural facility for sex offenders. In 2002, Lawrence retired from pastoral work. At some point, Barres had considered having Lawrence laicized. However, according to a spokesperson for the diocese, Barres finally decided:

"... to withdraw the application to remove Lawrence from the clerical state out of concern that if they did, he may leave the supervised, secure facility and re-enter society, where he might be a danger to children. 'Bishop Barres stands by his decision'".

Barres is a member of Opus Dei. In addition to his native English, he is fluent in Italian, French, and Spanish.

== Publications ==
Barres' father, Oliver Barres, wrote about the family's conversion to Catholicism in the book One Shepherd, One Flock (NY: Sheed & Ward, 1956).

Catholic Church titles
Preceded by Edward Peter Cullen	Bishop of Allentown; 2009–2017	Succeeded by Alfred Andrew Schlert
Preceded by William Murphy	Bishop of Rockville Centre; 2017–present	Succeeded by Incumbent
