= Edward Cullen (disambiguation) =

Edward Cullen is one of the main characters of the Twilight book series and film.

Edward Cullen may also refer to:

- Edward Cullen (bishop) (1933–2023), Roman Catholic bishop
- Ted Cullen a.k.a. Edward Luttrell Cullen (1895–1963), New Zealand politician
