= Thomas Welsh (bishop) =

American Catholic bishop (1921–2009)

His Excellency, The Most Reverend Thomas Jerome Welsh
- Bishop of Allentown; Titular Bishop of Inis Cathaig
- See: Diocese of Allentown
- Installed: March 21, 1983
- Term ended: December 15, 1997
- Predecessor: Joseph McShea
- Successor: Edward Cullen
- Other posts: Auxiliary Bishop of Philadelphia (1970–1974); Bishop of Arlington (1974–1983)

Orders
- Ordination: May 30, 1946 by Dennis Joseph Dougherty
- Consecration: April 2, 1970 by John Krol

Personal details
- Born: December 20, 1921 Weatherly, Pennsylvania, U.S.
- Died: February 19, 2009 (aged 87) Lehigh Valley Hospital–Cedar Crest, Allentown, Pennsylvania, U.S.
- Denomination: Catholic Church
- Education: St. Charles Borromeo Seminary; Catholic University of America
- Motto: Maria exelemplari omni instaurare (Mary is exemplary in everything she does)

Thomas Jerome Welsh (December 20, 1921 – February 19, 2009) was an American prelate of the Catholic Church. He served as auxiliary bishop of the Archdiocese of Philadelphia in Pennsylvania (1970–1974), as bishop of the Diocese of Arlington in Virginia (1974–1983) and as bishop of the Diocese of Allentown in Pennsylvania (1983–1997).

== Biography ==
=== Early life ===
Thomas Welsh was born on December 20, 1921, in Weatherly, Pennsylvania, one of five children of Edward C. and Mary A. (née Doheny) Welsh. Raised in a strict Irish Catholic family, he received his early education at the parochial school St. Nicholas Church in Weatherly. He then attended Schwab High School, also in Weatherly, and later began his studies for the priesthood at St. Charles Borromeo Seminary in Philadelphia, Pennsylvania, in 1937.

=== Priesthood ===
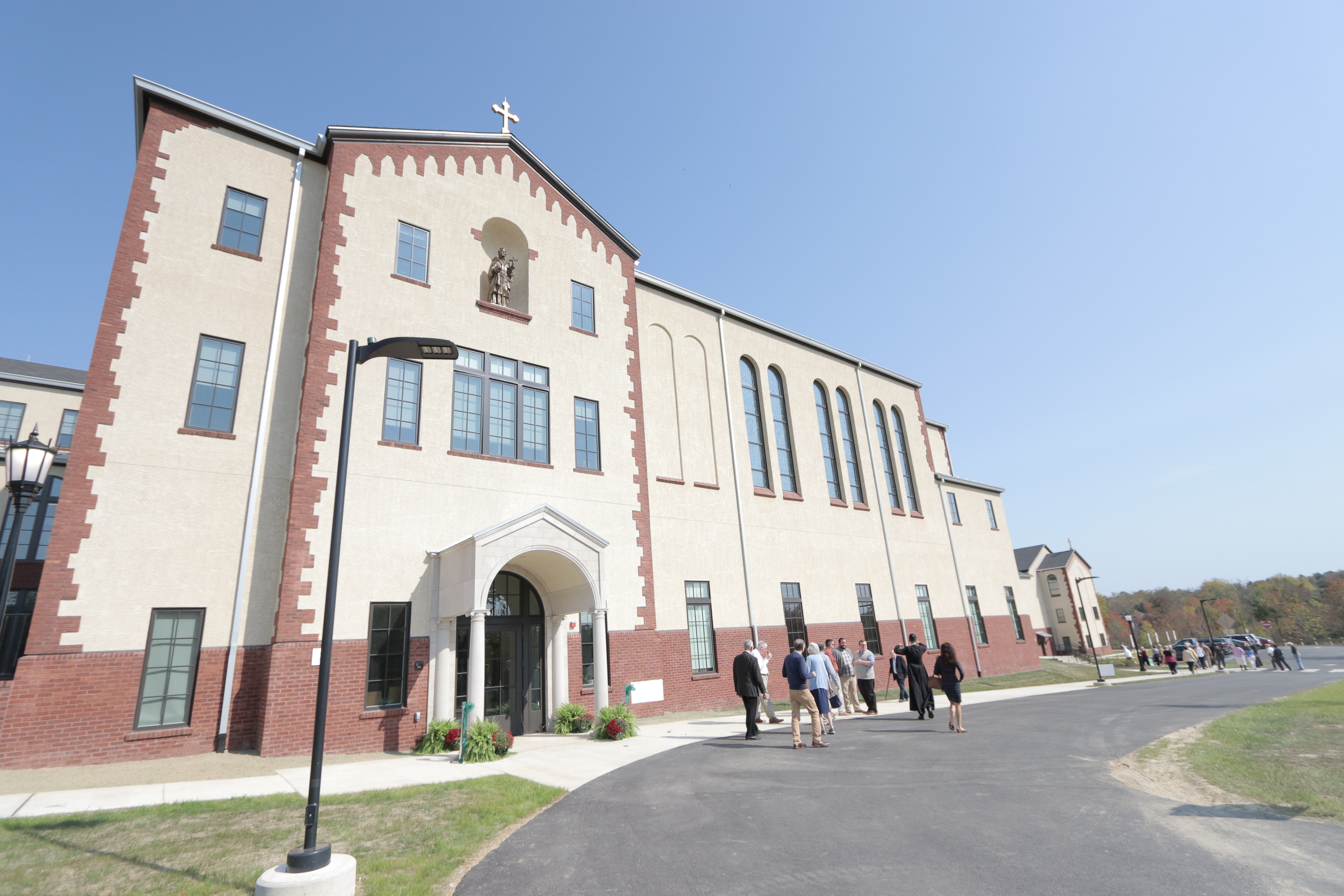
Saint Charles Borromeo Seminary, Lower Gwynedd, Pennsylvania (2024)

On May 30, 1946, Welsh was ordained a priest of the Archdiocese of Philadelphia by Cardinal Dennis Dougherty at the Cathedral of SS. Peter and Paul in Philadelphia After his ordination, the archdiocese sent Welsh to continue his studies at the Catholic University of America in Washington, D.C., where he earned a doctorate in canon law in 1949. During his summers at the Catholic University, he served as a curate at St. Paul Parish in Philadelphia, Maternity of the Blessed Virgin Mary Parish in Philadelphia, and Our Lady of Mount Carmel Parish in Doylestown, Pennsylvania.

In 1949, Welsh became a professor at Southeast Catholic High School (now St. John Neumann High School) in Philadelphia. He was assigned as a curate at Holy Child Parish in Philadelphia in 1951, and named a member of the archdiocesan Metropolitan Marriage Tribunal in 1958. He was appointed vice-chancellor of the archdiocese in 1963. He was raised to the rank of monsignor by Pope Paul VI in September 1965, and became rector of St. Charles Borromeo Seminary in 1966.

During his tenure as rector, Welsh oversaw an extensive revision of the curriculum, which earned the seminary accreditation with the Middle States Association of Colleges and Schools; the construction of a new theology wing named Vianney Hall; and the establishment the School of Religious Studies and the School of Pastoral Studies.

=== Auxiliary Bishop of Philadelphia ===
On February 18, 1970, Welsh was appointed as an auxiliary bishop of Philadelphia and titular bishop of Inis Cathaig by Paul VI. He received his consecration on April 2, 1970. from Cardinal John Krol, with Bishops Gerald McDevitt and John Graham serving as co-consecrators, at the Cathedral of SS. Peter and Paul. As an auxiliary bishop, he continued to serve as rector of St. Charles Borromeo Seminary.

=== Bishop of Arlington ===
Welsh was appointed by Paul VI as the first bishop of the newly erected Diocese of Arlington on June 4, 1974. He was installed on August 13, 1974. During his tenure, he established six new parishes and dedicated eleven new churches. He established the Office of Migration and Refugee Services in 1975 and the Family Life Bureau in 1977. Welsh also began the diocesan newspaper, The Arlington Catholic Herald.

Walsh was the founding president of the board of the Catholic Home Study Institute, which is today the Catholic Distance University. The number of Catholics in Arlington increased from 154,000 to 179,000 under his tenure.

=== Bishop of Allentown ===
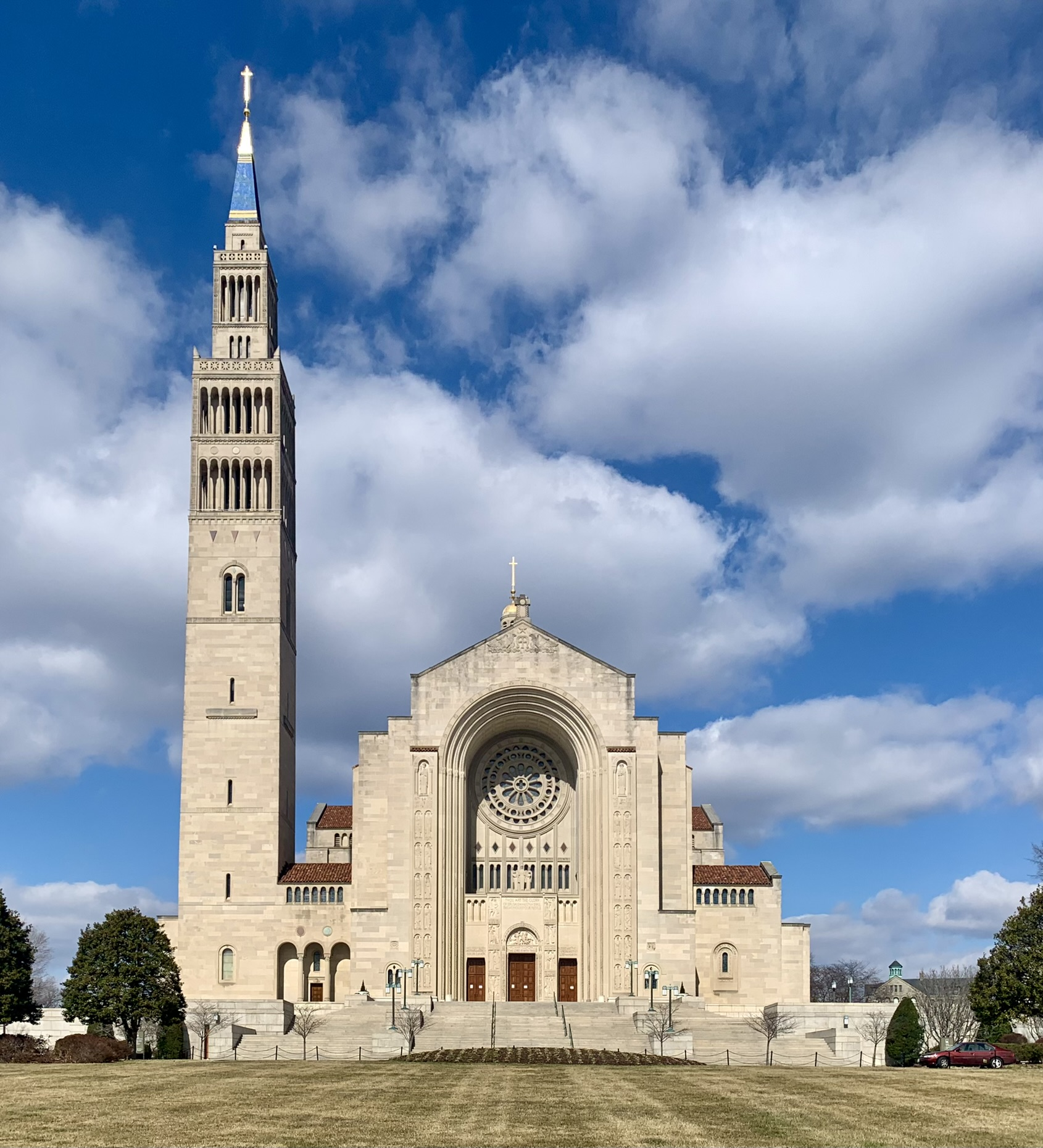
Basilica of the National Shrine of the Immaculate Conception, Washington, D.C. (2022)

Following the resignation of Bishop Joseph M. McShea, Welsh was appointed the second bishop of Allentown by Pope John Paul II on February 3, 1983. His installation took place at the Cathedral of St. Catharine of Siena in Allentown on March 21, 1983. During his tenure, Welsh established a "Stand Up For Life" campaign to encourage anti-abortion efforts, and frequently joined local abortion protesters for their monthly vigil at the Allentown Women's Clinic in Hanover Township. He held workshops on natural family planning and Humanae Vitae for the diocesan clergy.

Welsh established the first Youth Ministry Office in the diocese and raised $13 million in an endowment campaign for diocesan schools and other educational efforts. He was a board member and member of the executive committee of the National Shrine of the Immaculate Conception in Washington Despite his reputation as a conservative, Welsh allowed girls to serve as altar servers at mass, and gained recognition for his work to improve relations between Catholics and Jews. He turned his home, a mansion purchased by Bishop McShea and bequeathed to the diocese upon his death, into a center for pastoral work.

In 2018, Welsh was included in a report about cover-ups in six dioceses of Pennsylvania of child sexual abuse by priests. In the report, there are copies of correspondence with Bishop Leroy T. Matthiesen, referred to retired priest in Matthiesen's diocese as a recovering alcoholic. Welsh expressed concerns that the priest continue to be closely supervised. In 2002, the priest was arrested for abusing a 15-year-old boy.

=== Later life and death ===
On December 15, 1997, John Paul II accepted Welsh's resignation as bishop of Allentown. He was succeeded by Bishop Edward Peter Cullen. During his retirement, Welsh continued to administer the Sacrament of Confirmation at parishes around the diocese.

Thomas Welsh died February 19, 2009, at Lehigh Valley Hospital–Cedar Crest in Allentown at age 87. He was buried in St. Nicholas Cemetery in Weatherly.

== Notes ==
Catholic Church titles
| Preceded by – | Auxiliary Bishop of Philadelphia; 1970–1974 | Succeeded by – |
| Preceded by Diocese Erected | Bishop of Arlington; 1974–1983 | Succeeded by John Richard Keating |
| Preceded by Joseph Mark McShea | Bishop of Allentown; 1983–1997 | Succeeded by Edward Peter Cullen |
