= Ernest Leo Unterkoefler =

American Catholic prelate

His Excellency, The Most Reverend Ernest Leo Unterkoefler
- Bishop of Charleston
- See: Diocese of Charleston
- In office: December 12, 1964 to February 22, 1990
- Predecessor: Francis Frederick Reh
- Successor: David B. Thompson
- Other posts: Auxiliary Bishop of Richmond; 1961 to 1964

Orders
- Ordination: May 18, 1944 by John McNamara
- Consecration: February 22, 1962 by Egidio Vagnozzi

Personal details
- Born: August 17, 1917 Philadelphia, Pennsylvania, US
- Died: January 4, 1993 (aged 75) Columbia, South Carolina, US
- Denomination: Roman Catholic
- Education: Catholic University of America
- Motto: Deo Placere (To please God)

Ernest Leo Unterkoefler (August 17, 1917 – January 4, 1993) was an American Catholic prelate who served as Bishop of Charleston from 1964 to 1990. He previously served as an auxiliary bishop for the Diocese of Richmond from 1961 to 1964.

== Biography ==
=== Early life ===
Ernest Unterkoefler was born on August 17, 1917, in Philadelphia, Pennsylvania, to Ernest L. and Anna Rose (née Chambers) Unterkoefler. An avid baseball fan, he once considered a professional career in the sport before studying for the priesthood; he later said, "If I couldn't be bishop of Charleston, I'd love to be commissioner of baseball." Unterkoefler graduated summa cum laude in pre-law from the Catholic University of America in Washington D.C. in 1940. He also earned a Licentiate of Sacred Theology (1944) and Doctor of Canon Law (1950).

=== Priesthood ===
On May 18, 1944, Unterkoefler was ordained a priest in Washington, D.C. by Auxiliary Bishop John McNamara for the Diocese of Richmond. He then served as a curate for a diocese in Richmond until 1947, when he was transferred to another one in Arlington, Virginia. Unterkoefler returned to Richmond in 1950, and became secretary of the diocesan tribunal in 1954. He also served as chancellor (1960–1964) and vicar general (1962–1964). The Vatican named Unterkoefler a papal chamberlain in 1961.

=== Auxiliary Bishop of Richmond ===
On December 13, 1961, Unterkoefler was appointed auxiliary bishop of Richmond and titular bishop of Latopolis by Pope John XXIII. He received his episcopal consecration at the Cathedral of the Sacred Heart in Richmond on February 22, 1962, from Archbishop Egidio Vagnozzi, with Bishops Vincent Waters and Joseph Hodges serving as co-consecrators. Unterkoefler adopted as his episcopal motto: Deo Placere (Latin for "To Please God"). Between 1962 and 1965, he attended all four sessions of the Second Vatican Council in Rome, where he served as secretary of the American delegation of bishops.

=== Bishop of Charleston ===
Unterkoefler was named the tenth bishop of Charleston on December 12, 1964, by Pope Paul VI. An active participant in the civil rights movement, he worked alongside Dr. Martin Luther King Jr. and ended racial segregation in all Catholic institutions in the diocese. He served as chairman of the U.S. Bishops' Committee on Ecumenical and Interreligious Affairs from 1978 to 1981. In 1987, Unterkoefler hosted Pope John Paul II during his visit to Columbia, South Carolina.

Unterkoefler was also a prominent advocate for restoring the permanent diaconate in the United States, and ordained Joseph Kemper in 1971 as the first permanent deacon in the nation. In a 1985 interview, he said that his greatest satisfaction was in ordaining new priests, but also expressed his concern that a materialistic culture was making it more difficult to attract young men to the priesthood. "We can't go out and recruit them with high salaries," he said. "We must wait for the Lord to call them."

=== Death and legacy ===
Unterkoefler's resignation as bishop of Charleston was accepted by John Paul II on February 22, 1990. Unterkoefler died on January 4, 1993, at Providence Hospital in Columbia at age 75.

Catholic Church titles
Preceded by Francis Frederick Reh	Bishop of Charleston; 1964–1990	Succeeded by David B. Thompson
