= 2014 FEU Tamaraws basketball team =

American college basketball season

2014 FEU Tamaraws men's basketball
- Conference: UAAP
- Record: 13-7 (10-4) UAAP Final Four (def. DLSU in the semifinals 73-94, 67-64; lost to NU in finals 75-70, 47-62, 59-75 UAAP)
- Head coach: Nash Racela
- Assistant coach: Johnny Abarrientos, Josh Reyes

The 2014 FEU Tamaraws men's basketball team represented Far Eastern University in UAAP's 77th men's basketball tournament. The team finished second after losing to NU Bulldogs in the finals in three games.

== Departures ==
| Name | Number | Pos. | Height | Weight | Year | Hometown | Notes |
|---|---|---|---|---|---|---|---|
| RR Garcia | 8 | SG | 5'11" | 165 | Senior | Zamboanga City, Philippines | Graduated/declared for 2013 PBA Draft |
| Terrence Romeo | 7 | PG | 5'11" | 180 | Senior | Imus, Cavite, Philippines | declared for 2013 PBA Draft |
| Gryann Mendoza | 9 | SG | 6'2" | - | Senior | Davao, Philippines | Graduated |

== Roster ==
FEU Tamaraws roster
Players
Coaches

| Pos. | No. | Nat. | Name | Height | Year | High School |
|---|---|---|---|---|---|---|
| SF | 4 | (Philippines) | Cruz, Carl Bryan V. | 6'3" (1.91m) | Final Year | Faith Christian Academy |
| G/F | 5 | (Philippines) | Tamsi, Al Francis M. | 5'11" (1.8m) | 1st | Bohol |
| PF | 6 | (Philippines) | Jose, Raymar A. | 6'4" (1.93m) | 3rd | Arellano |
| PG | 7 | (Philippines) | Dennison, Ron Marvis C. | 5'9" (1.75m) | 2nd | University of the Visayas |
| C | 8 | (Philippines) | Escoto, Russel D. | 6'6" (1.98m) | 4th | FEU Diliman |
| SG | 9 | (Philippines) | Delfinado, Jeson F. | 5'11" (1.8m) | 2nd | FEU Diliman |
| SF | 10 | (Philippines) | Escoto, Richard D. | 6'2" (1.88m) | 1st | FEU Diliman |
| PG | 11 | (Canada) | David, Jason Aurel | – | 1st | Tamanawis |
| PF | 12 | (Philippines) | Belo, Rey Mark G. | 6'3" (1.91m) | 3rd | St. Mary's - Midsayap |
| SG | 13 | (Philippines) | Tolomia, Christian Michael S. | 5'11" (1.8m) | 4th | FEU Diliman |
| C | 15 | (United States) | Hargrove, Anthony Jr. R. | 6'6" (1.98m) | 5th | Pius X |
| G/F | 16 | (Philippines) | Pogoy, Roger Ray B. | 6'2" (1.88m) | 4th | University of Cebu |
| PG | 17 | (Philippines) | Denila, Augus Vince M. | 6'3" (1.91m) | 1st | Ateneo De Iloilo |
| PG | 18 | (Philippines) | Iñigo, Alejandrino Antonio Jr. S. | 5'8" (1.73m) | 3rd | Letran |
| SG | 20 | (South Korea) | Lee Yu, Joel Christian C. | 5'9" (1.75m) | 2nd | FEU Diliman |
| PF | 21 | (Philippines) | Ugsang, Reeve | 6'6" (1.98m) | 1st | University of the Visayas |

Head coach

- (Philippines) Nash Racela

Assistant coach(es)

- (Philippines) Johnny Abarrientos
- (Philippines) Ronald Magtulis
- (Philippines) Michael Oliver
- (Philippines) Gilbert Lao
- (Philippines) Joshua Reyes

Team manager

- (Philippines) Mark Molina
- (Philippines) Anton Montinola

Legend

- (C) Team captain
- Injured

== Game summaries ==
| Date | Score | High points | High assist | High rebounds | Venue | Record |
|---|---|---|---|---|---|---|
Round 1
| July 12 | 82-77 vsDLSU | Tolomia (23) | Tolomia (5) | 3 tied (5) | Smart Araneta | 1-0 |
| July 16 | vsAdU | | | | Mall Of Asia Arena | postponed |
| July 20 | 67-69 vsUST | Belo (19) | Tolomia (4) | Belo (6) | Mall Of Asia Arena | 1-1 |
| July 27 | 85-71 vsUP | Tolomia (18) | Inigo (5) | Belo (9) | Mall Of Asia Arena | 2-1 |
| July 30 | 73-63vsUE | Belo (21) | Tolomia (6) | Hargrove (12) | Mall Of Asia Arena | 3-1 |
| Aug 3 | vsADMU | Belo (22) | Belo (4) | Hargrove (13) | Smart Araneta | 3-2 |
| Aug 9 | 71-62 vsNU | Cruz (16) | Tolomia (4) | Belo (7) | Mall Of Asia Arena | 4-2 |
| Aug 13 | 71-62 vsAdU | Tolomia (21) | 2 tied (4) | Pogoy (8) | Smart Araneta | 5-2 |
Source: pba-online.net

| Date | Score | High points | High assist | High rebounds | Venue | Record |
|---|---|---|---|---|---|---|
Round 2
| Aug 17 | 74-70 (OT) vsNU | Belo (23) | Tolomia (5) | Belo (10) | Smart Araneta | 6-2 |
| Aug 23 | 66-55 vsUST | Pogoy (19) | Inigo (4) | Belo (8) | Mall Of Asia Arena | 7-2 |
| Aug 27 | 74-70 vsDLSU | Tolomia (22) | 2 tied | 2 tied | Mall Of Asia Arena | 8-2 |
| Aug 30 | 75-69 vsUP | Tolomia (19) | Cruz (4) | Inigo (10) | Smart Araneta | 9-2 |
| Sept 3 | 90-73 vsAdU | Inigo (18) | 2 tied (4) | Belo (12) | Smart Araneta | 10-2 |
| Sept 7 | 71-94 vsUE | Belo (16) | Inigo (5) | Belo (8) | Smart Araneta | 10-3 |
| Sept 13 | 64-68 (OT) vsADMU | Belo (16) | Tolomia (6) | Cruz (10) | Smart Araneta | 10-4 |
Source: pba-online.net

| Date | Score | High points | High assist | High rebounds | Venue | Record |
|---|---|---|---|---|---|---|
Postseason
| Sept 21 | 65-60 vsDLSU | Tolomia (19) | 2 tied (3) | Belo (10) | MOA Arena | 1-0 |
| Sept 27 | 73-94 vsDLSU | Belo (32) | Tolomia (4) | 2 tied (7) | MOA Arena | 1-1 |
| Oct 1 | 67-64 vsDLSU | Belo (23) | Tolomia (6) | Pogoy (11) | Smart Araneta | 2-1 |
| Oct 4 | 75-70 vsNU | Tolomia (15) | 3 tied (3) | 3 tied (7) | MOA Arena | 3-1 |
| Oct 8 | 47-62 vsNU | Belo (17) | Inigo (3) | Pogoy (9) | Smart Araneta | 3-2 |
| Oct 16 | 59-75 vsNU | - | - | - | Smart Araneta | 3-3 |
Source: pba-online.net
