= 2012 FEU Tamaraws basketball team =

2012 FEU Tamaraws men's basketball season
Head coach	Bert Flores
Manager	Anton Montinola
History
Record	9-5
Place	5th
Season
2011	2013

The 2012 FEU Tamaraws men's basketball team represented Far Eastern University for the 75th UAAP men's college basketball tournament. The team finished fifth, with a win-loss record of 9-5.

== Roster ==
Number	Year	Player	Position	Nationality	School
12	1	Rey Mark Belo	F	Philippines	St. Mary's
16	2	Arvie Bringas	PF	Philippines	San Sebastian
15	3	Anthony Hargrove	C	United States	Pius X
18	1	Alejandrino Antonio Iñigo	PG	Philippines	Letran
11	1	Raymar Jose	C	Philippines	Arellano
23	1	Marc Czesar Clutario	PG	Philippines	Quirino High School
7	3	Terrence Romeo	SG	Philippines	FEU Diliman
20	2	Roger Ray Pogoy	G/F	Philippines	University Of Cebu
8	4	Ryan Roose Garcia	PG	Philippines	Southern City Colleges
13	2	Christian Michael Tolomia	SG	Philippines	FEU Diliman
17	2	Russel Escoto	PF	Philippines	FEU Diliman
4	3	Carl Bryan Cruz	SF	Philippines	Faith Christian Academy
2	2	Francis Mendoza	PF	Philippines	FEU Diliman

== Results ==
Date	Score	High points	High assist	High rebounds	Venue	Record
Round 1
July 14	73-72 vsUST	Garcia - 21	Garcia- 7	Hargrove - 14	Mall of Asia Arena	1-0
July 22	48-46 vsDLSU	Romeo - 10	Garcia - 4	Pogoy - 8	Mall of Asia Arena	2-0
July 26	65-62 vsAdU	Romeo - 23	Romeo - 6	Belo - 9	Smart Araneta Coliseum	3-0
July 29	92-66 vsUE	Romeo - 19	Romeo - 8	Hargrove - 9	Mall of Asia Arena	4-0
August 2	61-57 vsNU	Romeo - 18	Romeo/Belo - 3	Hargrove - 9	Smart Araneta Coliseum	4-1
August 5	73-70 vsUP	Romeo - 24	Romeo - 8	Romeo/Hargrove - 9	Mall of Asia Arena	5-1
August 18	74-71 vsADMU	Garcia - 21	Garcia - 4	Hargrove - 10	Smart Araneta Coliseum	5-2
Round 2
August 23	87-60 vsUST	Romeo - 19	Garcia - 11	Pogoy - 11	Mall of Asia Arena	6-2
August 26	76-68 vsAdU	Romeo - 27	Garcia - 6	Hargrove - 10	Smart Araneta Coliseum	7-2
August 29	77-64 vsADMU	Garcia - 14	Garcia - 5	Hargrove - 9	Mall of Asia Arena	7-3
September 8	83-78 vsUE	Romeo - 24	Pogoy - 4	Pogoy - 13	Mall of Asia Arena	8-3
September 13	67-63 vsUP	Pogoy - 16	Garcia - 4	Hargrove - 12	Philsports Arena Pasig	9-3
September 16	63-56 vsDLSU	Romeo - 26	3 tied - 2	Garcia/Hargrove - 6	Mall of Asia Arena	9-4
September 23	84-81OT vsNU	Romeo - 25	Tolomia - 3	Garcia - 9	Smart Araneta Coliseum	9-5
Fourth seed play-off
September 26	69-66 vsDLSU	Romeo - 13	Garcia - 6	Escoto - 5	Mall of Asia Arena	9-5

== Awards received ==
Terrence Romeo - Mythical Team
