= Joseph McShea =

American prelate

His Excellency, The Most Reverend Joseph McShea
- Bishop of Allentown
- Church: Roman Catholic Church
- See: Diocese of Allentown
- In office: 1961–1983
- Predecessor: none
- Successor: Thomas Jerome Welsh
- Previous post: Auxiliary Bishop of Philadelphia (1952–1961)

Orders
- Ordination: December 6, 1931 by Francesco Marchetti Selvaggiani
- Consecration: March 19, 1952 by Amleto Giovanni Cicognani

Personal details
- Born: February 22, 1907 Lattimer, Pennsylvania, US
- Died: November 28, 1991 (aged 84) Allentown, Pennsylvania, US
- Education: St. Charles Borromeo Seminary; Pontifical Roman Seminary; Pontifical Lateran University
- Motto: Sub umbra Petri (Under the shadow of Peter)

Joseph Mark McShea (February 22, 1907 – November 28, 1991) was an American prelate of the Roman Catholic Church. He served as the first bishop of the Diocese of Allentown in Pennsylvania from 1961 to 1983. McShea previously served as an auxiliary bishop of the Archdiocese of Philadelphia in Pennsylvania from 1952 to 1961.

== Early life and education ==
Joseph McShea was born in Lattimer, Pennsylvania, on February 22, 1907, one of seven children of Roger A. and Jeanette (née Beach) McShea. He received his early education at the parochial school of Transfiguration of Our Lord Parish in Philadelphia. He graduated from West Philadelphia Catholic High School for Boys in 1923, and then began his studies for the priesthood at St. Charles Borromeo Seminary in Philadelphia.

In 1926, McShea was sent to continue his studies in Rome at the Pontifical Roman Seminary and the Pontifical Lateran University. He earned a doctorate in theology in 1932.

== Priesthood ==
McShea was ordained a priest in Rome for the Archdiocese of Philadelphia by Cardinal Francesco Marchetti Selvaggiani on December 6, 1931. After his ordination, the archdiocese assigned McShea in 1932 to the faculty at St. Charles Borromeo Seminary, where he taught Latin, Italian, and history.

McShea returned to Rome in 1935, where he spent the next three years serving as a minutante of the Congregation for the Oriental Churches in the Roman Curia. In 1938, he went to Washington D.C. to work as secretary of the Apostolic Delegation in Washington, D.C. The Vatican named McShea as a papal chamberlain in 1938 and raised him to the rank of domestic prelate in 1948.

=== Auxiliary Bishop of Philadelphia ===
On February 8, 1952, McShea was appointed auxiliary bishop of Philadelphia and titular bishop of Mina by Pope Pius XII. He received his episcopal consecration on March 19, 1952, from Archbishop Amleto Cicognani, with Bishops Eugene J. McGuinness and William O'Brien serving as co-consecrators, at the Cathedral of SS. Peter and Paul in Philadelphia. He selected as his episcopal motto: Sub Umbra Petri ("In the Shadow of Peter"). As an auxiliary bishop, he served as pastor of St. Francis de Sales Parish in Philadelphia.

=== Bishop of Allentown ===
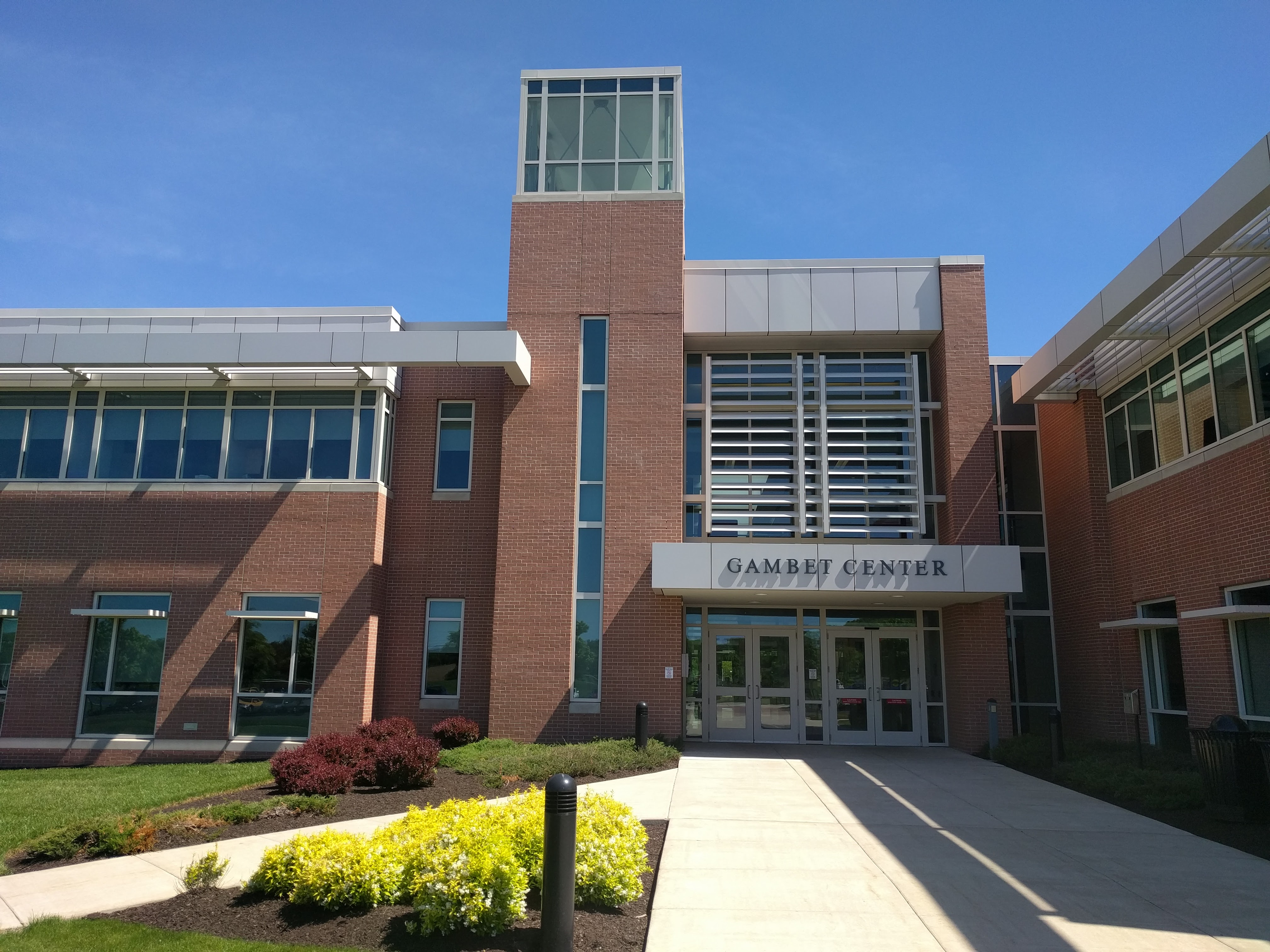
DeSales University, Center Valley, Pennsylvania (2017)

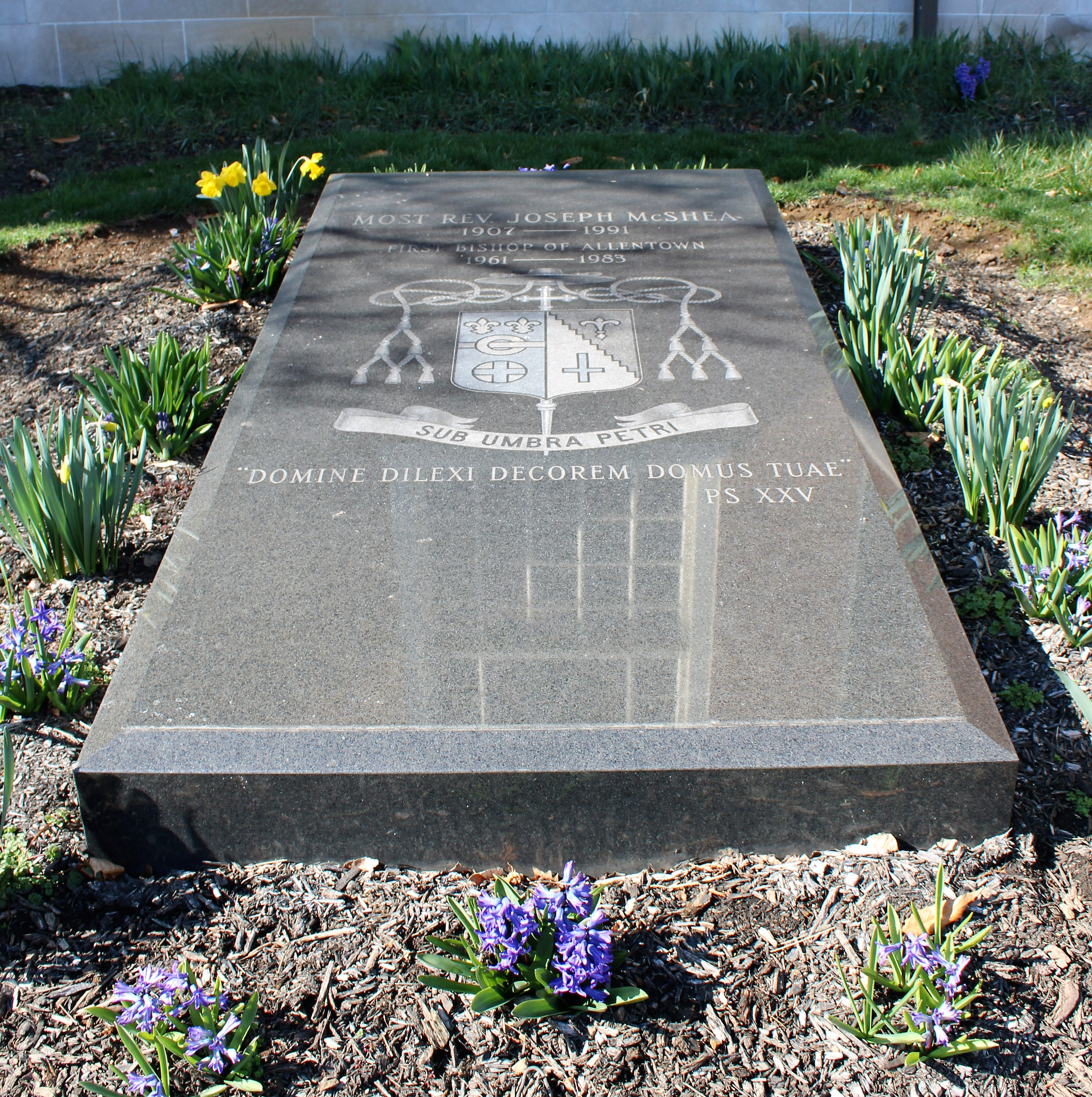
Bishop McShea's gravesite at the Cathedral of Saint Catharine of Siena in Allentown, Pennsylvania (2022)

McShea was appointed the first bishop of the newly erected Diocese of Allentown by Pope John XXIII on February 11, 1961. His installation took place at the Cathedral of Saint Catharine of Siena in Allentown on April 11, 1961. In 1953, he was appointed president of the American Catholic Historical Society.

Between 1962 and 1965, McShea attended all four sessions of the Second Vatican Council in Rome. During the Council, he was one of 18 American bishops elected to the 10 commissions that facilitated the Council's work, and served as relator for the Commission for Religious.

McShea founded "Operation Rice Bowl" to combat famine in Africa. Each parish in the diocese put out a small cardboard box to received donations for this cause. In 1976 Operation Rice Bowl was adopted by the United States Conference of Catholic Bishops as a national program, and in 1977 it was assigned to Catholic Relief Services.

McShea helmed the founding of Holy Family Manor, a nursing and rehabilitation center at the former Eugene Grace mansion in Bethlehem, Pennsylvania. He also established Holy Family Villa in Bethlehem, a retirement home for priests. He convened the first diocesan synod in May 1968. In 1969, McShea sued the board of directors of Sacred Heart Hospital to prevent them from merging with Allentown Hospital as Allentown-Sacred Heart Hospital Center. His objective was to maintain the Catholic identity of Sacred Heart.

During his 22-year tenure, McShea oversaw the construction, purchase, and renovation of over 300 church buildings. In 1964, McShea, together with the Oblates of St. Francis de Sales, founded Allentown College in Center Valley, Pennsylvania; today, it is DeSales University.

=== Retirement and legacy ===
On February 3, 1983, Pope John Paul II accepted McShea's resignation as bishop of Allentown. McShea, long ill from diabetes and other conditions, died on November 28, 1991, at age 84. He is buried on the cathedral grounds.

Catholic Church titles
Preceded by Diocese Erected	Bishop of Allentown; 1961–1983	Succeeded by Thomas Jerome Welsh
Preceded by –	Auxiliary Bishop of Philadelphia; 1952–1961	Succeeded by –
