= Edward Cullen (bishop) =

American Catholic bishop (1933–2023)

His Excellency, The Most Reverend Edward Peter Cullen
- Bishop of Allentown
- Church: Roman Catholic
- Diocese: Diocese of Allentown
- Appointed: December 16, 1997
- Installed: February 9, 1998
- Term ended: May 27, 2009
- Predecessor: Thomas Jerome Welsh
- Successor: John Barres
- Previous post: Auxiliary Bishop of Philadelphia and Titular Bishop of Paria in Proconsolare (1994–1998)

Orders
- Ordination: May 19, 1962 by John Krol
- Consecration: April 14, 1994 by Anthony Bevilacqua, John Patrick Foley, and Francis B. Schulte

Personal details
- Born: March 15, 1933 Philadelphia, Pennsylvania, U.S.
- Died: May 9, 2023 (aged 90) Lehigh Valley Hospital–Cedar Crest, Allentown, Pennsylvania, U.S.
- Education: Drexel Institute of Technology; St. Charles Borromeo Seminary; University of Pennsylvania; La Salle University
- Motto: Christ - church - compassion

Styles of Edward Peter Cullen
- Reference style: His Excellency; The Most Reverend
- Spoken style: Your Excellency
- Religious style: Bishop

Edward Peter Cullen (March 15, 1933 – May 9, 2023) was an American prelate of the Roman Catholic Church who served as bishop of the Diocese of Allentown in Pennsylvania from 1998 to 2009 and as an auxiliary bishop of the Archdiocese of Philadelphia from 1994 to 1998.

== Early life and education ==
Cullen was born on March 15, 1933, to an Irish Catholic family in Philadelphia, Pennsylvania, to Edward Peter and Julia Catherine (née Leahy) Cullen. He was raised in the Yeadon section of Philadelphia, along with his older sister, Joan, and three younger brothers, Joseph, James, and John. Cullen attended West Philadelphia Catholic High School for Boys, where he played football, participated in track and field athletics and was involved in the school newspaper. After school, Cullen worked as a cashier at an Acme Market.

Following his graduation from West Catholic, Cullen studied engineering at Drexel Institute of Technology in Philadelphia. In 1953, he entered St. Charles Borromeo Seminary in the Overbrook section of Philadelphia, where he obtained a Bachelor of Arts degree in 1958.

== Career ==
=== Ordination and ministry ===
On May 19, 1962, Cullen was ordained to the priesthood for the Archdiocese of Philadelphia by Archbishop John Krol in the Cathedral Basilica of Saints Peter and Paul in Philadelphia. After his ordination, Cullen served as an assistant pastor at St. Maria Goretti Parish in Hatfield, Pennsylvania for three years, then went to St. Bartholomew Parish in Philadelphia.

Krol sent Cullen to study at the University of Pennsylvania, where he was awarded a Master of Social Work degree in 1970. This was followed by a Master of Religious Education degree from La Salle University in Philadelphia (1971) and a Master of Divinity degree from St. Charles Borromeo Seminary (1974). From 1979 to 1993, Cullen served as a chaplain at St. Edmond's Home for Children in Bryn Mawr, Pennsylvania.

The Vatican raised Cullen to the rank of honorary prelate in April 1982. He served as director of Catholic Social Services from 1983 to 1988. In August 1988, Cullen was named vicar general of the archdiocese.

=== Auxiliary Bishop of Philadelphia ===
On February 8, 1994, Pope John Paul II appointed Cullen as an auxiliary bishop of Philadelphia and titular bishop of Paria in Proconsolare. He received his episcopal consecration on April 14, 1994, at Saints Peter and Paul from Cardinal Anthony Bevilacqua, with Archbishops John Foley and Francis Schulte serving as co-consecrators. Cullen selected as his episcopal motto: "Christ, Church, Compassion".

=== Bishop of Allentown ===
Pope John Paul II appointed Cullen as bishop of Allentown on December 16, 1997, replacing the retiring Bishop Thomas Welsh. Cullen was installed on February 9, 1998. In 2003, he was appointed to the board of trustees of The Catholic University of America.

In January 2004, Cullen stopped allowing the celebration of mass and other sacraments at The National Centre for Padre Pio in Barto, Pennsylvania, located in the diocese. Cullen had previously expressed concern over the Centre's fundraising practices and lavish salaries for family members managing the Centre. The Centre appealed Cullen's ruling to the Vatican, which rejected its appeal. In September 2020, Bishop Alfred A. Schlert lifted the sacrament ban on the Centre.

In 2008, Cullen carried out a restructuring of parishes in the diocese. The diocese closed 47 parishes for a new total of 104 parishes. Some of the closed churches were then sold.

=== Retirement and legacy ===
Cullen's letter of resignation as bishop of Allentown was accepted on May 27, 2009, by Pope Benedict XVI. At the same time, the pope named Monsignor John Barres as his replacement.

On August 14, 2018, Pennsylvania Attorney General Josh Shapiro released a grand jury report on the handling of sexual abuse allegations against priests in Pennsylvania. The report showed that Cullen, as bishop of Allentown, instructed his vicar general, then Monsignor Alfred Schlert, to act as an "enabler" when handling abuse allegations. Shapiro said that Schlert and others earned promotions from Cullen for their work in handling the allegations. By the time the grand jury report was released, many records on sex abuse in the diocese were missing. The grand jury report involved six Pennsylvania dioceses, and it stated that "we believe that the real number — of children whose records were lost, or who were afraid ever to come forward — is in the thousands."

Cullen died on May 9, 2023, at Lehigh Valley Hospital–Cedar Crest, in Allentown, Pennsylvania, at age 90.

== Episcopal succession ==
Catholic Church titles
Preceded by –	Bishop Emeritus of Allentown; 2009–2023	Succeeded by –
Preceded by Thomas Jerome Welsh	Bishop of Allentown; 1998–2009	Succeeded by John Barres
Preceded by –	Auxiliary Bishop of Philadelphia; 1994–1998	Succeeded by –
Preceded by Post created	Titular Bishop of Paria in Proconsolare; 1994–1998	Succeeded by Jean-Paul Randriamanana
