= Diocese of Allentown =

Catholic ecclesiastical territory in Pennsylvania, U.S.

Diocese of Allentown Diœcesis Alanpolitana
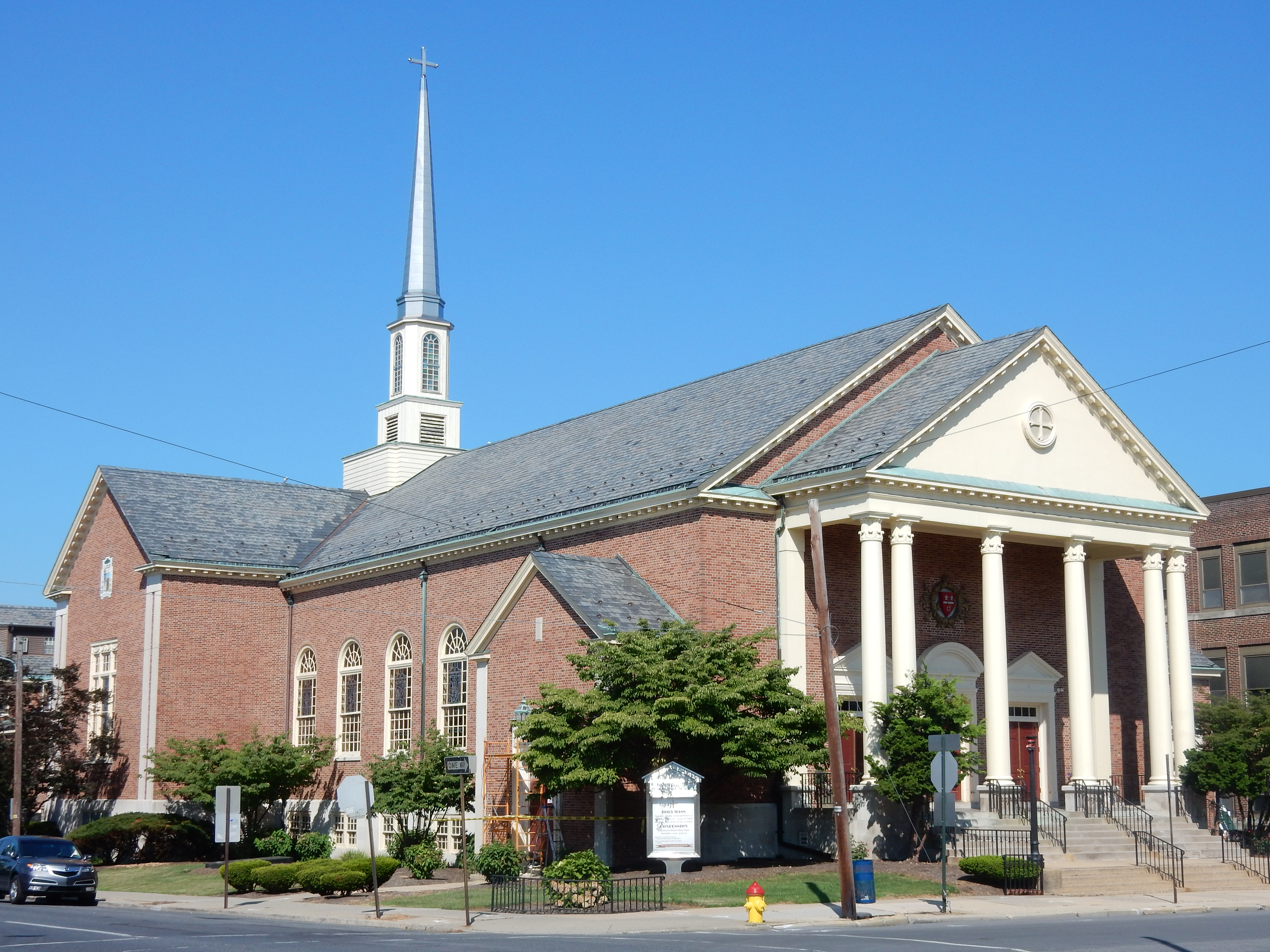
- Cathedral of St. Catharine of Siena in Allentown in August 2015

- Coat of Arms of the Diocese of Allentown

- Flag

Location
- Country: United States
- Territory: Pennsylvania counties of Berks, Carbon, Lehigh, Northampton and Schuylkill, in the United States
- Ecclesiastical province: Archdiocese of Philadelphia
- Headquarters: 1515 Martin Luther King Jr Dr., Allentown, Pennsylvania, U.S.
- Coordinates: 40°36′06″N 75°28′38″W

Statistics
- Area: 2,773 sq mi (7,180 km^{2})
- Population: Total; Catholics: (as of 2025); 1,301,308; 205,000 (15.8%)
- Parishes: 78

Information
- Denomination: Catholic
- Sui iuris church: Latin Church
- Rite: Roman Rite
- Established: January 28, 1961
- Cathedral: Cathedral of Saint Catharine of Siena
- Patron saint: Mary, Mother of the Church
- Secular priests: 210

Current leadership
- Pope: Leo XIV
- Bishop: Alfred A. Schlert
- Metropolitan Archbishop: Nelson J. Perez

Map
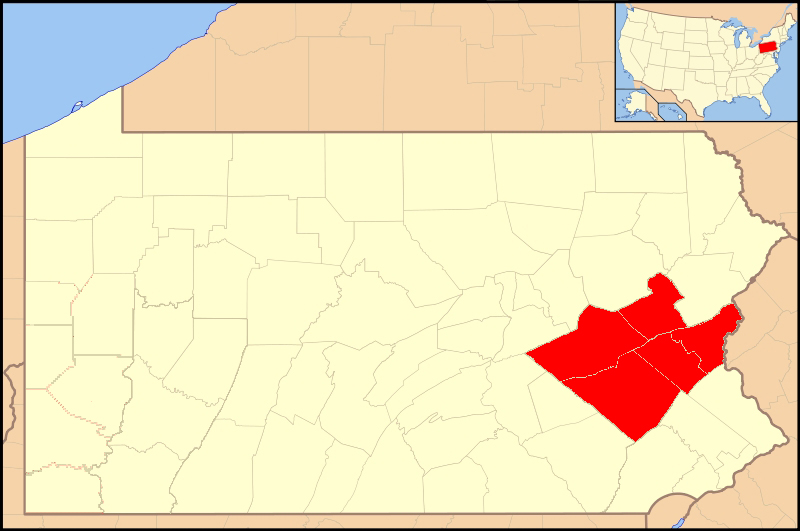
- Ecclesiastical jurisdiction of the Catholic Diocese of Allentown in eastern Pennsylvania

Website
- allentowndiocese.org

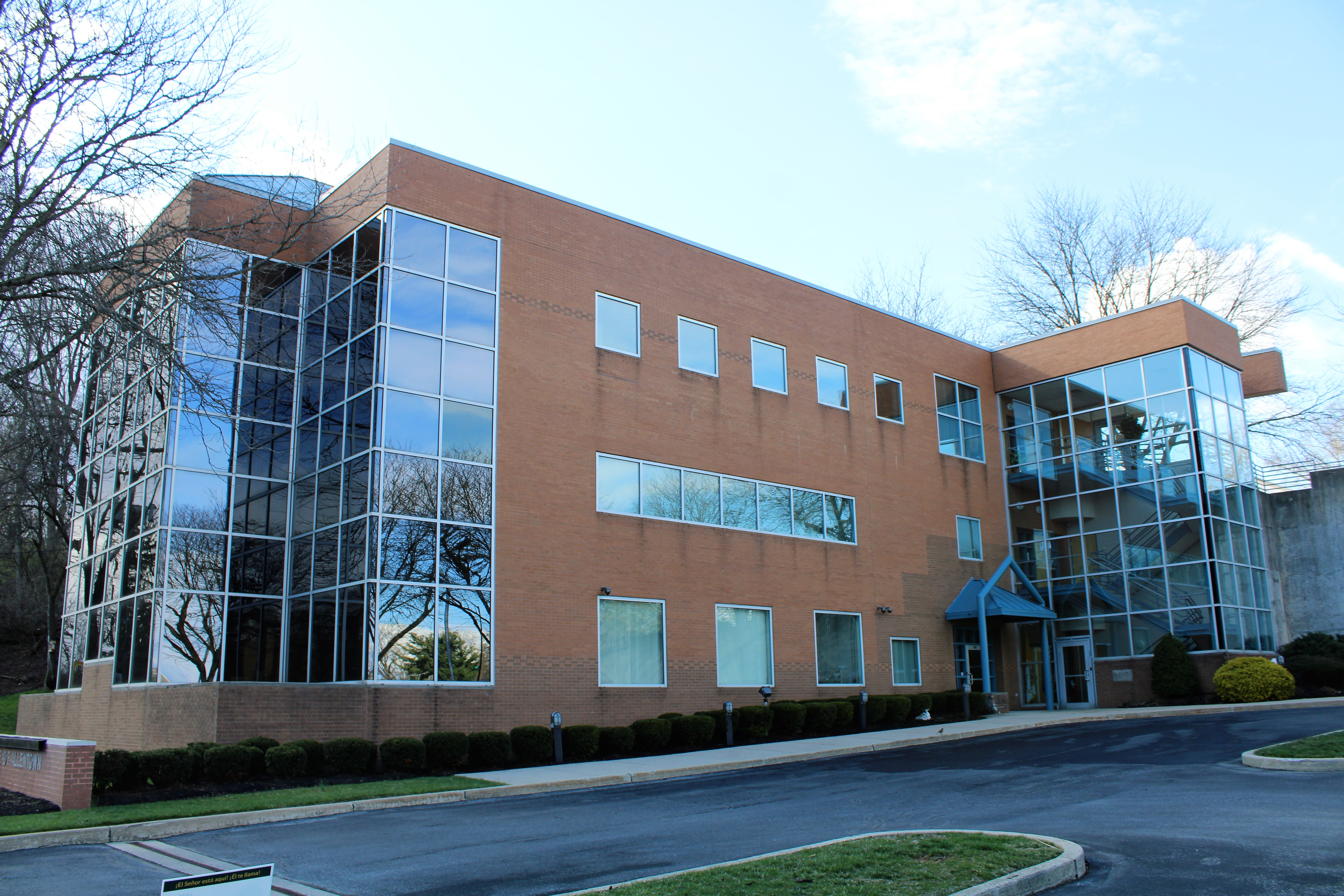
Pastoral Center, Allentown, Pennsylvania (2022)

The Diocese of Allentown (Latin: Diœcesis Alanpolitana) is a diocese of the Catholic Church in the Lehigh Valley region of Pennsylvania in the United States. It is a suffragan diocese in the ecclesiastical province of the metropolitan Archdiocese of Philadelphia. The mother church of the Diocese of Allentown is the Cathedral Church of Saint Catharine of Siena in Allentown. The bishop is Alfred A. Schlert.

The Diocese of Allentown covers Berks, Carbon, Lehigh, Northampton and Schuylkill counties. As of 2025, the diocese had a registered population of 205,000 served by 78 parishes.

== History ==
=== 18th century ===
Unlike the other colonies in British America, the Province of Pennsylvania did not ban Catholics from the colony or threaten priests with imprisonment. This was in part because the founder of the colony, William Penn, was a leading advocate of religious freedom. However Catholics who sought public office in the colony were required to take an oath to Protestantism.

The earliest Catholic mission in the Lehigh Valley was established in the 1720s in Goshenhoppen, whose residents came from a community in Philadelphia. The first resident priest arrived there in 1741. The mission would serve Catholics throughout the southeastern part of the British Province of Pennsylvania. During the Feast of Corpus Christi, some Protestant residents of Goshenhoppen mistook a Catholic procession for a military drill and complained to the colonial governor.

During the French and Indian War of 1754 to 1763, the colonial government prohibited Pennsylvania Catholics from joining the colonial militia out of fear that their loyalties were with the French. The first Catholic settlers in Allentown started arriving around 1763. For the next several decades, they were only seen by traveling priests. During the American Revolution of 1776 to 1782, many Pennsylvania Catholics served in the militias and colonial army. Catholic missionaries and army chaplains tended to wounded and sick American and French soldiers at a military hospital in Allentown.

In 1784, a year following the end of the war, Pope Pius VI erected the Apostolic Prefecture of United States of America, including all of the new United States.In 1789, Pius VI converted the prefecture to the Diocese of Baltimore, covering all of the United States. With the passage of the Bill of Rights as part of the US Constitution in 1791, Catholics received full freedom of worship.

=== 19th century ===
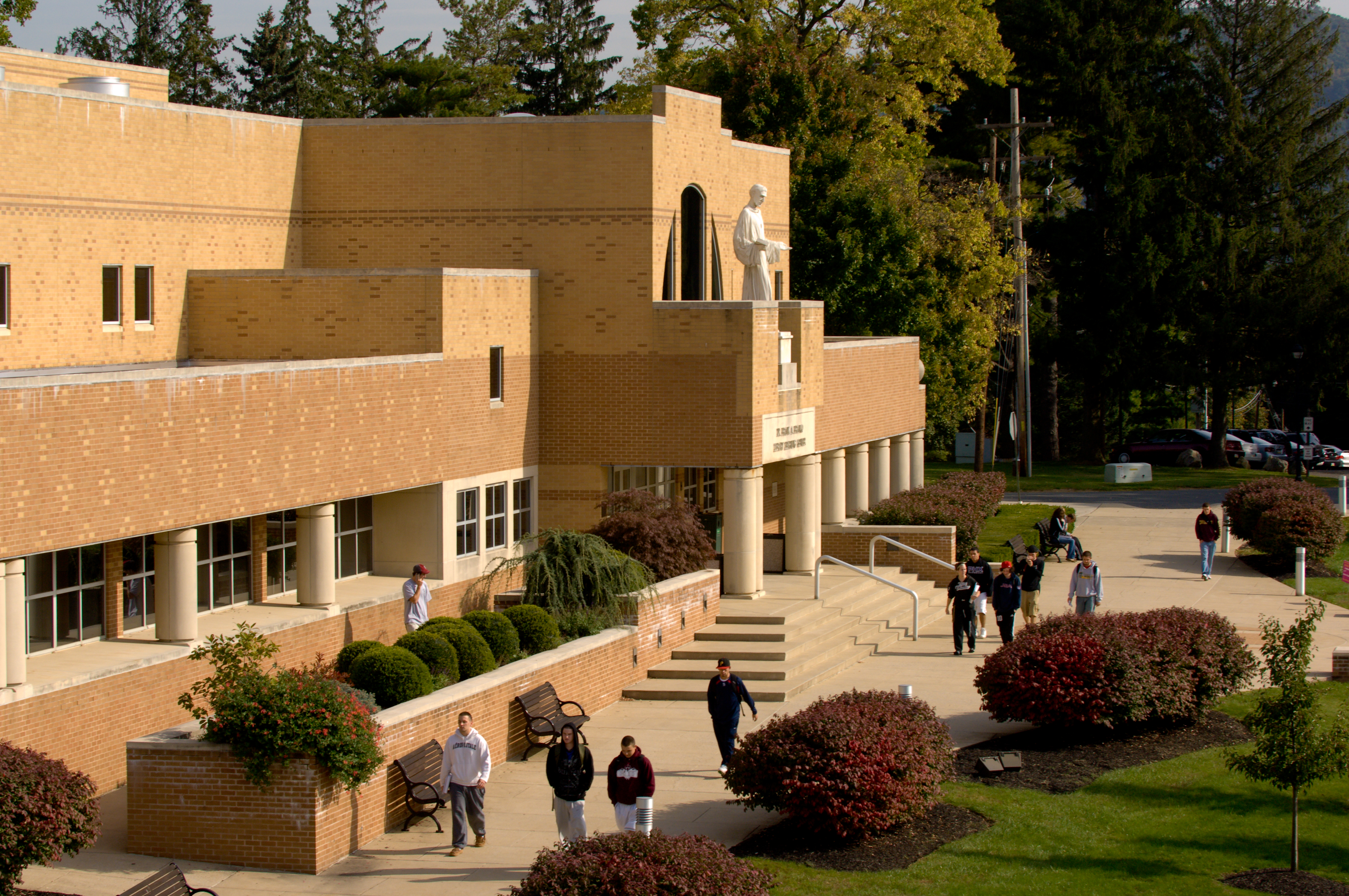
Alvernia University, Reading, Pennsylvania (2012)

After the discovery of anthracite coal in the Lehigh Valley region, increased numbers of Catholic immigrants started moving in to work in the mines and related industries. In 1836, the first Catholic parish in the Lehigh Valley, St. Bernard's, was erected in Easton in 1836.

In the Hazleton area, the first Catholic church was constructed in Beaver Meadows in 1847. The first Catholic church in Allentown was Immaculate Conception, dedicated in 1857. In Bethlehem, the first Catholic church was Holy Infancy, which opened in 1861.

=== 20th century ===
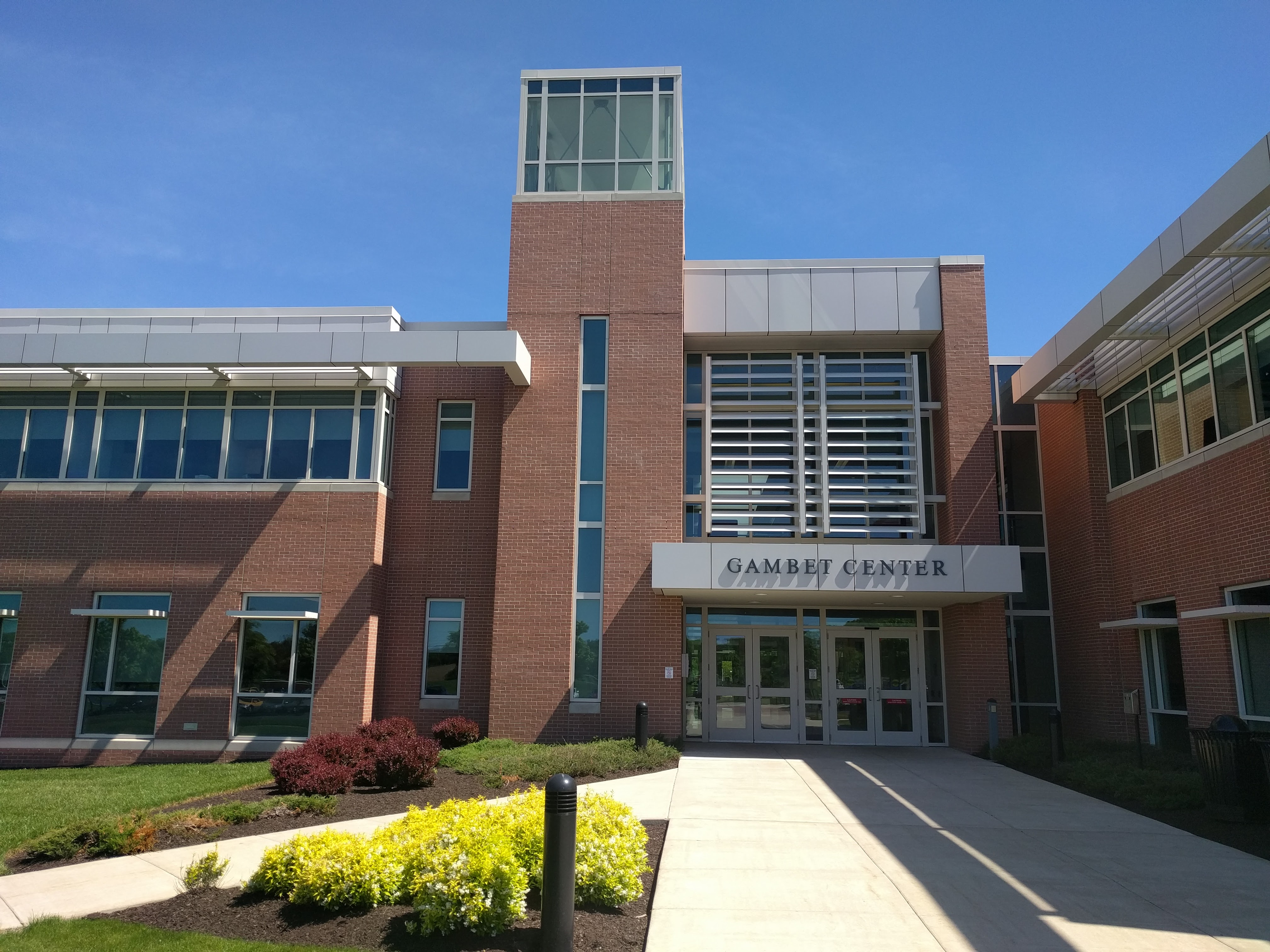
De Sales University, Center Valley, Pennsylvania (2017)

The Missionary Sisters of the Most Sacred Heart, a German religious order, came to Allentown in 1912 to found Sacred Heart Hospital. It is today part of St. Luke's University Health Network.In 1958, Alvernia College was founded in Reading by the Bernardine Franciscan Sisters.

On January 28, 1961, the Diocese of Allentown was founded by Pope John XXIII with territory from the Archdiocese of Philadelphia. He appointed Auxiliary Bishop Joseph McShea of Philadelphia as the first bishop of the new diocese.

During his 22-year tenure, McShea oversaw the construction, purchase, and renovation of over 300 church buildings. In 1963, he founded Holy Family Manor, a nursing and rehabilitation center at Eugene Grace's former mansion in Bethlehem. In 1964, McShea and the Oblates of St. Francis de Sales founded Allentown College; it is now DeSales University. He convened the first diocesan synod in May 1968.

McShea founded "Operation Rice Bowl", which began in the form of a small cardboard box in the parishes of the diocese to receive alms directed to relieving a famine in Africa. In 1976, it was adopted by the U.S. Conference of Catholic Bishops as a national program. He also established Holy Family Villa, a retirement home in Bethlehem for priests. McShea retired in 1983. In 1981, a parent reported to the archdiocese that his 12-year-old son had been sexually molested that day by Michael S. Lawrence, a priest at St. Catharine of Siena Parish in Mount Penn. The archdiocese removed Lawrence from the parish the next day and secured treatment for him. A year later, the archdiocese returned Lawrence to ministry. The family met with Bishop Welsh in 1994 to protest Lawrence remaining in ministry, but they said he was not interested in their complaints. In March 2002, Bishop Schlert met with the family and told them that Lawrence had been removed from ministry.

In 1983, Pope John Paul II named Bishop Thomas Welsh from the Diocese of Arlington as the second bishop of Allentown. Welsh established the first Youth Ministry Office in the diocese and raised $13 million in an endowment campaign for diocesan schools and other educational efforts, improved relations between Catholics and Jews and founded both AD Times, a diocesan newspaper, and Catholic Distance University. In 1997, Welch retired as bishop of Allentown.

In 1998, Pope John Paul II appointed Auxiliary Bishop Edward Cullen of Philadelphia as the third bishop of Allentown.

=== 21st century ===
In 2004, Cullen revoked the celebration of mass and other sacraments at The National Centre for Padre Pio in Barto. Cullen had previously expressed concern over the center's fundraising practices and lavish salaries for family members managing the center. The Centre appealed Cullen's ruling to the Vatican, which rejected its appeal. Ronald J. Yarrosh, assistant pastor of St. Ambrose Catholic Church in Schuylkill Haven, was arrested in May 2004 on charges of possessing child pornography. Investigators found huge numbers of pornographic images, magazines, and DVDs in his rectory apartment. Yarrosh also embezzled $23,000 in parish funds. The archdiocese sent him to a treatment facility. Yarrosh pleaded guilty and was sentenced to 23 months in prison. In 2008, Cullen closed 47 parishes in the diocese, reducing the total number from 151 to 104. Some of the closed churches were then sold. Cullen retired as bishop of Allentown in 2008.

In 2008, Pope Benedict XVI named Monsignor John Barres from the Diocese of Wilmington as the bishop of Allentown. During his tenure, Barres established the Saint Thomas More Society for lawyers, and expanded the diocese's Hispanic ministry and evangelization. In 2016, Barres was named bishop of the Diocese of Rockville Centre.

In early 2016, Pennsylvania Attorney General Josh Shapiro convened a grand jury investigation into the alleged sexual abuse of minors by Catholic clergy in six Pennsylvania dioceses, including the Diocese of Allentown. That same month, the grand jury report named 37 priests in the diocese with credible accusations of sexual misconduct over several decades. Bishop Schlert stated that the cases dated back decades and that most of the accused priests were dead or no longer active in the ministry. Schlert also said that the diocese had had a zero-tolerance policy for sexual abuse since 2003.

Shapiro criticized Schlert for his role in handling the sex abuse allegations. Commenting on the grand jury report, Schlert noted that "much has changed in the past 15 years, notably, that the diocese immediately removes accused priests from ministry and reports allegations to law enforcement." The diocese removed three priests from ministry after the grand jury report was released; one was reinstated when the allegation was determined to be unfounded.

The Pennsylvania grand jury report in 2018 revealed copies of letters between Bishop Welsh and Bishop Leroy T. Matthiesen of the Diocese of Amarillo. The conversation was about a retired priest in Amarillo who was a recovering alcoholic. Welsh expressed that the priest still needed to be closely supervised. In 2002, the priest was arrested for abusing a 15-year-old boy. In August 2018, Kevin Lonergan, a diocesan priest, was charged with indecent assault and corruption of minors after inappropriately touching a 17-year-old girl and sending nude images of himself to her. In February 2020, Lonergan was convicted and sentenced to time in prison.

In May 2020, Timothy McGettigan, a former parishioner of St. Catharine of Siena Parish in Reading, sued the diocese. He said that he was sexually abused in the 1970s by two priests, Joseph Grembocki and David A. Soderlund, along with other priests he could not identify. Soderlund was defrocked in 2005 and Grembocki died in 2016. Though Soderlund was named in the Pennsylvania grand jury report, Grembocki was not.In August 2020, it was announced that the diocese had 20 new sex abuse lawsuits.

In 2016, Reverend Alfred Schlert of Allentown was named by Pope Francis as its next bishop. As of 2026, he is the current bishop of Allentown.

== Bishops ==
=== Bishops of Allentown ===
1. Joseph Mark McShea (1961–1983)
2. Thomas Jerome Welsh (1983–1997)
3. Edward Peter Cullen (1997–2009)
4. John Oliver Barres (2009–2016), appointed Bishop of Rockville Centre
5. Alfred A. Schlert (2017–present)

=== Other diocesan priests who became bishops ===
- Ronald William Gainer, appointed Bishop of Lexington in 2002 and later Bishop of Harrisburg
- Joseph Edward Kurtz, appointed Bishop of Knoxville in 1999 and later Archbishop of Louisville
- David B. Thompson, appointed Coadjutor Bishop of Charleston in 1989 and later Bishop of Charleston

== Catholic education ==
=== Higher education ===
- Alvernia University – Reading
- DeSales University – Center Valley

=== High schools ===
As of 2025, the Diocese of Allentown operates six high schools:

- Allentown Central Catholic High School – Allentown
- Berks Catholic High School – Reading
- Bethlehem Catholic High School – Bethlehem
- Marian Catholic High School – Tamaqua
- Nativity BVM High School – Pottsville
- Notre Dame High School – Easton
