= Notre Dame High School (Easton, Pennsylvania) =

Private school in Easton, Pennsylvania, United States

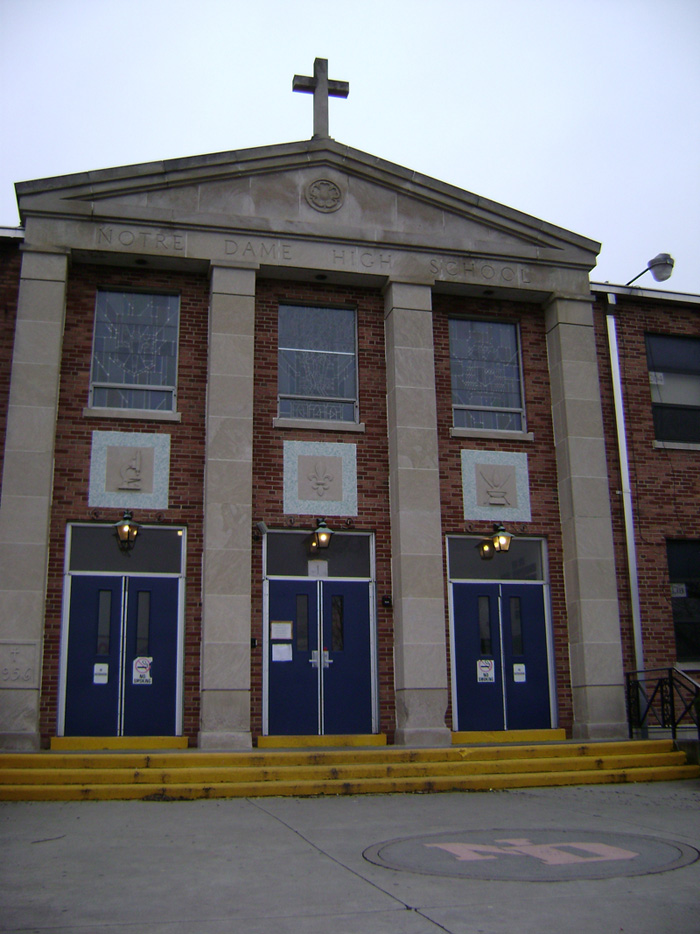
- Notre Dame High School in Easton, Pennsylvania in November 2009

Location
- 3417 Church Road; Easton, Northampton County, Pennsylvania 18045; United States
- Coordinates: 40°40′8″N 75°18′11″W

Information
- Type: Private, coeducational
- Motto: Ipsam sequens non devias. (If you follow Her, you will never go astray.)
- Religious affiliation: Roman Catholic
- Established: 1957
- School district: Allentown Diocese Schools
- Oversight: Notre Dame High School, Inc. Board of Directors
- Superintendent: Phil Fromuth
- CEEB code: 391133
- NCES School ID: 01189005
- Dean: Philip Stambaugh
- Administrator: Dena Farrell
- Principal: Jaclyn Friel
- Chaplain: Rev. Dan Kravatz
- Faculty: 37.9 (on an FTE basis)
- Grades: 9th–12th
- Student to teacher ratio: 12.7
- Campus type: Suburb: Large
- Colors: Blue and Gold
- Slogan: It's A Great Day To Be A Crusader!
- Athletics: PIAA
- Athletics conference: Colonial League
- Sports: Baseball, Basketball (Boys and Girls), Football, Soccer (Girls), Softball, Tennis (Boys and Girls), Track and field, and Wrestling
- Nickname: Notre Dame Green Pond
- Team name: Crusaders
- Rival: Wilson Area High School
- Accreditation: Middle States Association of Colleges and Schools
- Newspaper: The Crusader
- Yearbook: MEMORARE
- Tuition: $10,000
- Admissions Director: Mandy Kopp
- Athletic Director: Amy Rogers
- Website: ndcrusaders.org

Notre Dame High School, also known as Notre Dame Green Pond, is a private, Catholic high school in Easton, Pennsylvania in the Lehigh Valley region of eastern Pennsylvania. It is located within the Roman Catholic Diocese of Allentown.

As of the 2023-24 school year, the school had an enrollment of 543 students, according to National Center for Education Statistics data.

The school serves students from four surrounding Pennsylvania counties, two counties in New Jersey, and several foreign countries. The school's students have a broad socioeconomic background, varying from urban to suburban. The community is mostly residential with several commercial and light industrial areas. Notre Dame offers an education program to children with learning disabilities, known as the Aquinas Program.

== Activities and athletics ==
Notre Dame competes within the Colonial League and District XI. They are noted for their strong athletics programs. They are rivals with neighboring Wilson Area High School. They field the following varsity sports in the boys' category: football, soccer, cross country, volleyball, golf, basketball, wrestling, tennis, track, and baseball.

In girls sports, the school fields teams in volleyball, cross country, tennis basketball, soccer, track, and softball teams.

The school also has an agreement with Moravian Academy, which permits its students play lacrosse and field hockey for them, and an agreement with Bethlehem Catholic High School, which allows them to play ice hockey with them in the Lehigh Valley Scholastic Hockey League (LVSHL).

== Notable alumni ==
- Marco Andretti, professional race car driver
- Michael Flynn, science fiction author
- Kristen McMenamy, supermodel
- Niki and Gabi, singers and actresses
- Alfred A. Schlert, Roman Catholic Diocese of Allentown bishop

== Notable staff ==
- Father Bernard T. Pagano, Catholic priest and school teacher who was falsely accused in a string of armed robberies in Delaware and Pennsylvania, which served as the basis for the 1981 film The Gentleman Bandit.
