= Pius X High School (Pennsylvania) =

Location
- 580 Third Avenue; Bangor, (Northampton County), Pennsylvania 18013-1376; United States
- 40°52′28″N 75°12′49″W

Information
- Type: Private, Coeducational
- Motto: Loyalty, Purity, Piety
- Religious affiliation: Roman Catholic
- Established: 1951
- Status: Closed
- Closed: 2015
- Oversight: Roman Catholic Diocese of Allentown
- President: Fr. Patrick Lamb
- Principal: Jim Angeline
- Grades: 9-12
- Colors: Royal Blue and White
- Team name: Royals
- Accreditation: Middle States Association of Colleges and Schools
- Athletic Director: Connie Stambaugh
- Website: http://www.piusxhs.org

Pius X High School was a private, Roman Catholic high school in Bangor, Pennsylvania, in the Lehigh Valley region of eastern Pennsylvania. Part of the Roman Catholic Diocese of Allentown, it operated from 1951 to 2015.

== History ==
Pius X was established as Our Lady of Mount Carmel High School in 1951 by the Salesian Sisters. It was renamed after Pope Pius X in 1953, shortly after his canonization.

Due to declining enrollment, Pius X High School was forced to close its doors on June 2, 2015. At the time, the school's enrollment had dropped to just 165 students in grades 7 through 12, with the final senior class consisting of 46 students...about 27% of the student body. Students in grades 7 through 11 were forced to transfer to other nearby public or private schools following Pius X's closure.

According to a statement released by the diocese, enrollment at Pius X had declined by nearly 43 percent with estimates for the coming year projecting a further decline to 150 students. At the time of the announcement, school leaders were also anticipating that they would end the school's final fiscal year with an operating debt of $1.2 million (over and above the $1 million subsidy which had been provided by the diocese for the 2009-10 school year).
