= Cathedral of Saint Catharine of Siena =

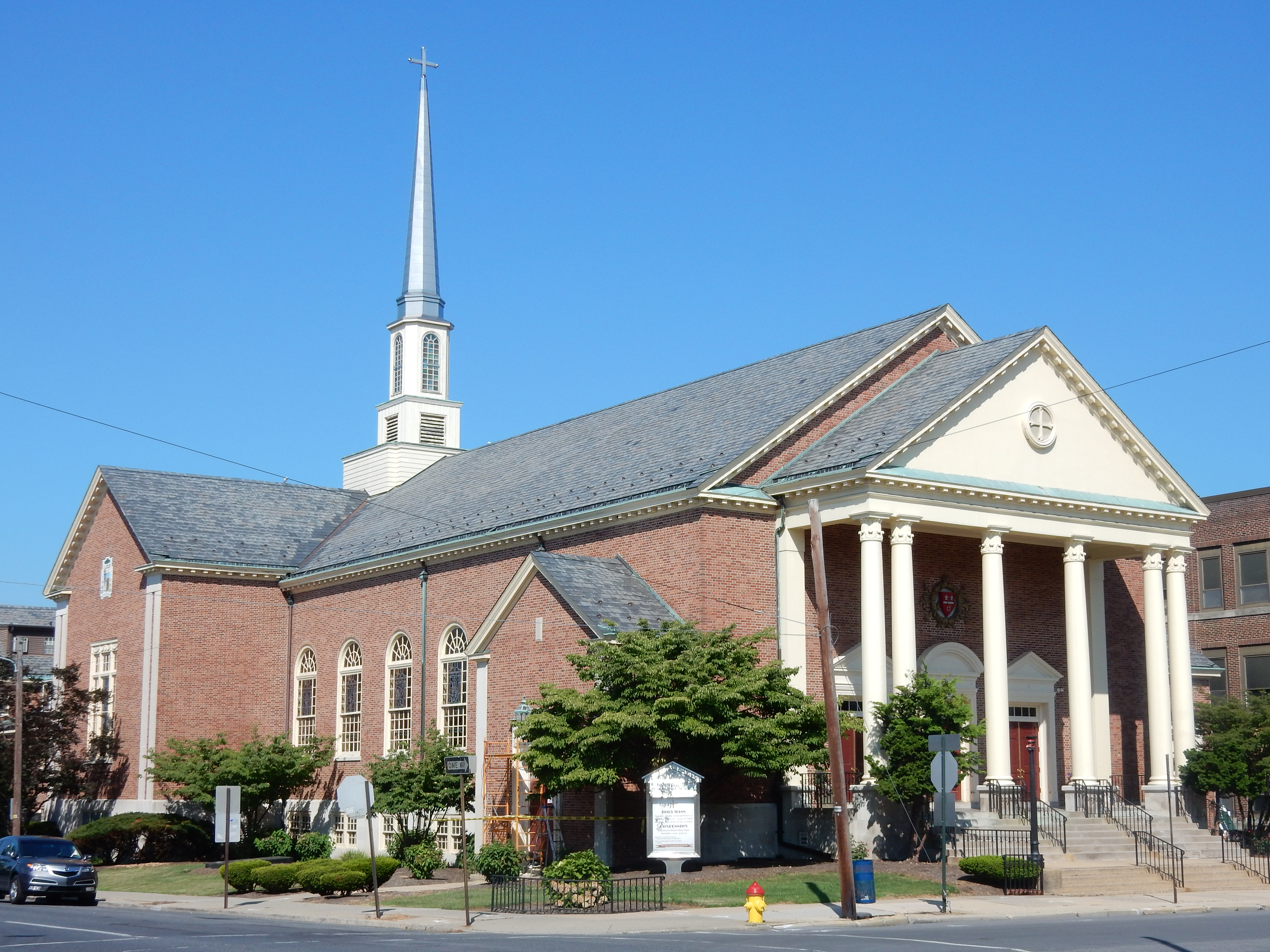
- Cathedral of Saint Catharine of Siena in August 2015

- Location of Allentown in Pennsylvania
- 40°35′55.89″N 75°29′46.56″W
- Location: 1825 Turner St. Allentown, Pennsylvania
- Country: United States
- Denomination: Roman Catholic
- Website: www.cathedral-church.org

History
- Status: Cathedral/Parish
- Founded: 1919
- Dedication: Catharine of Siena

Architecture
- Style: Colonial Revival
- Groundbreaking: June 9, 1952
- Completed: 1953

Specifications
- Materials: Brick

Administration
- Diocese: Allentown

Clergy
- Bishop: Alfred Andrew Schlert
- Rector: Rev. Monsignor Donald W. Cieniewicz

The Cathedral Church of St. Catharine of Siena is the seat of the Diocese of Allentown. It is located at 1825 Turner Street in Allentown, Pennsylvania.

== History ==
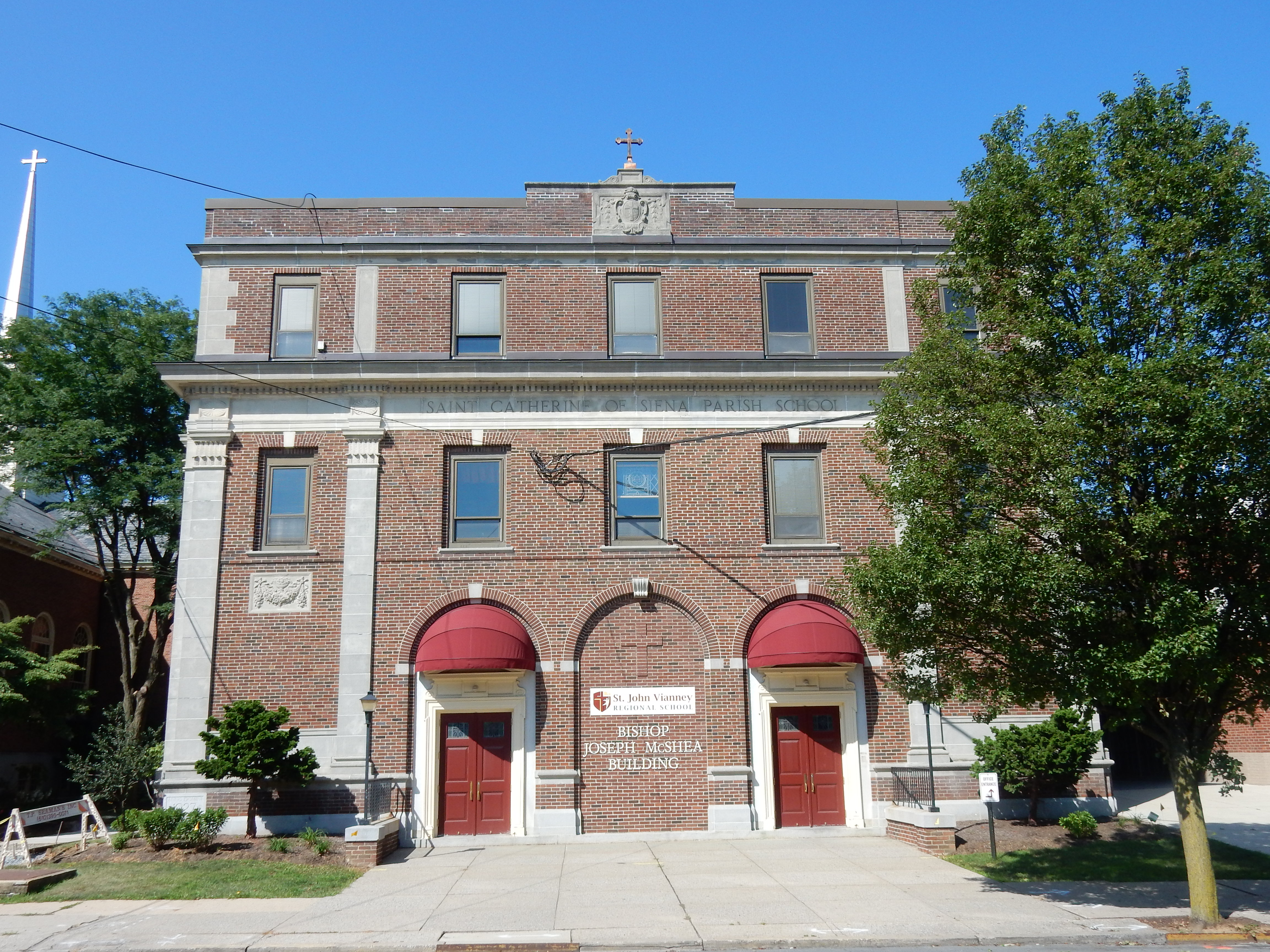
Cathedral of Saint Catherine of Siena's Bishop Joseph McShea Building

Saint Catharine of Siena Parish was founded October 8, 1919, when Archbishop Dennis Cardinal Dougherty, Archdiocese of Philadelphia appointed the Reverend John C. Phelan as pastor of a new church in the west end of Allentown.

By 1952, the parish campus had grown greatly, with additions of a school and convent and there was a need for a new church. On June 9, 1952, Msgr. Leo Fink broke ground on the new church. The Most Reverend Joseph M. McShea, Auxiliary Bishop of the Archdiocese of Philadelphia laid the cornerstone of the new structure on April 26, 1953. The building was designed in the Colonial Revival style. The exterior is faced with a variegated salmon brick trimmed with Salem limestone. At the crossing formed by the transept, there is a tall spire topped with a cross. The windows are colonial glazed antique glass.

== The Cathedral ==
In 1961, the Diocese of Allentown was carved out from the Archdiocese of Philadelphia. The St. Catharine of Siena parish was honored to learn that their church was to be the seat of the new bishop The church would become the Cathedral Church of St. Catharine of Siena.

The Most Reverend Joseph McShea, D.D. was installed as the first Bishop of Allentown on April 11, 1961, thus officially raising St. Catharine of Siena Church to a Cathedral.

== Gallery ==
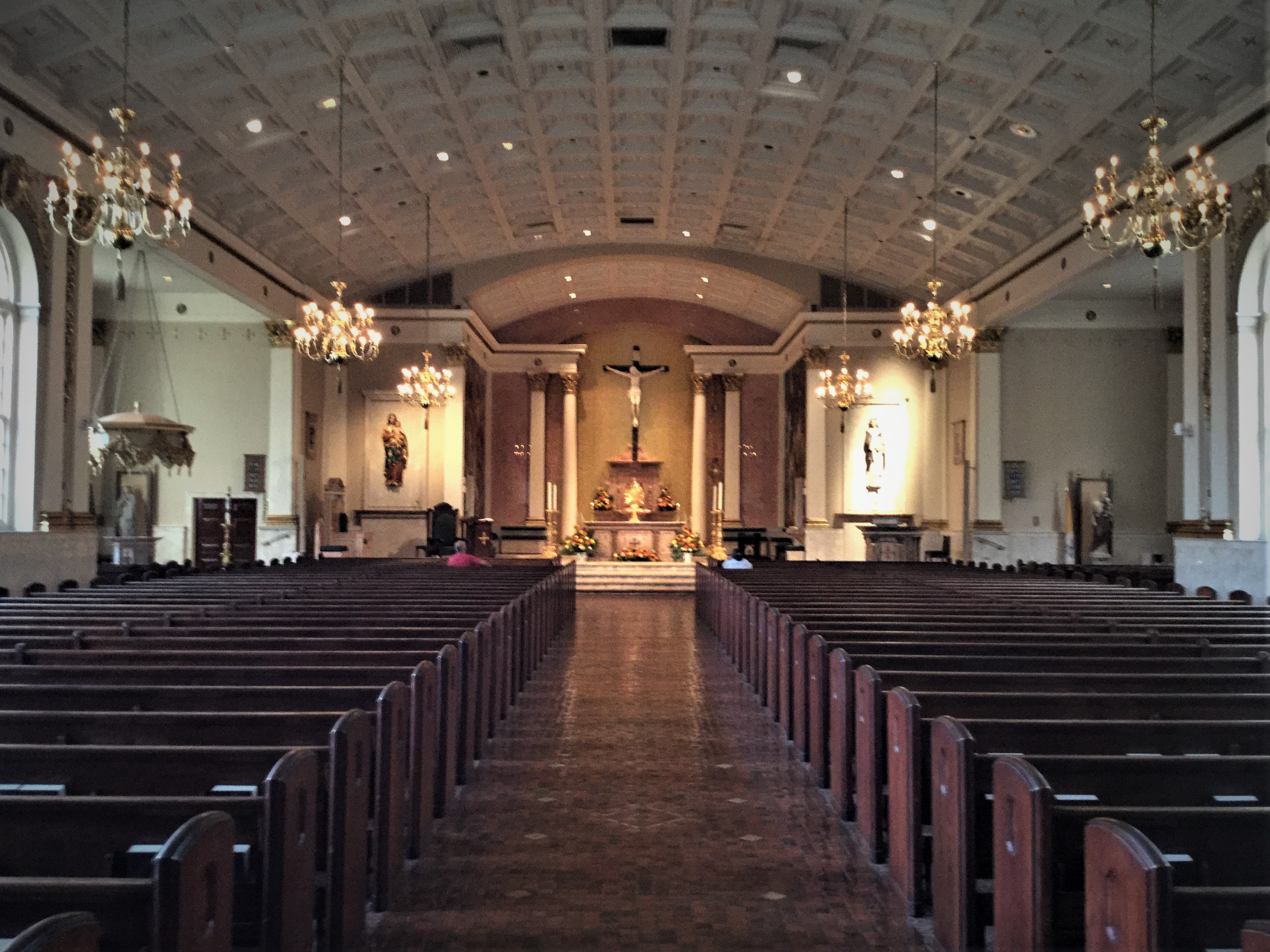
Interior of Cathedral of Saint Catharine of Siena

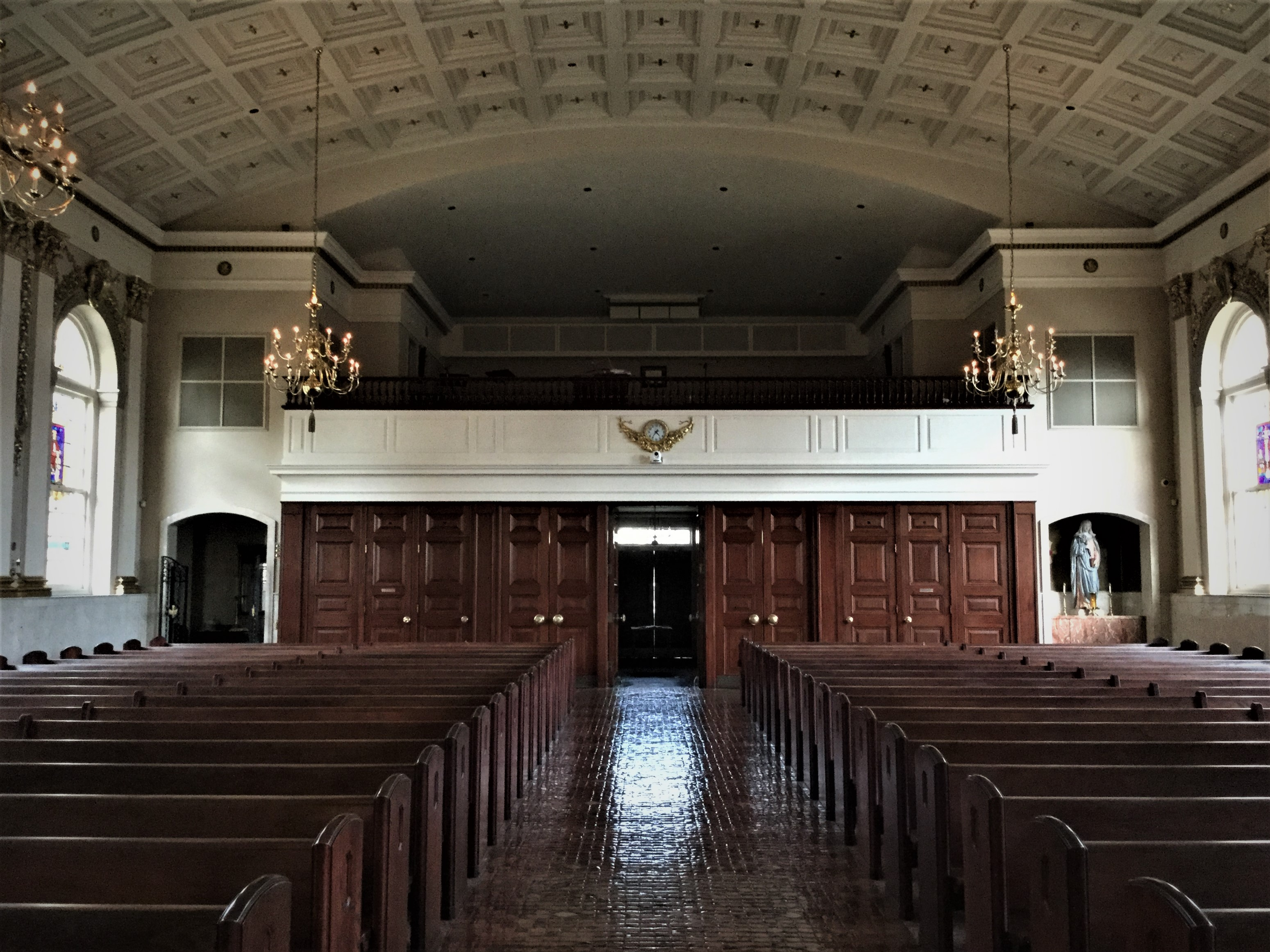
Rear of Cathedral of Saint Catharine of Siena

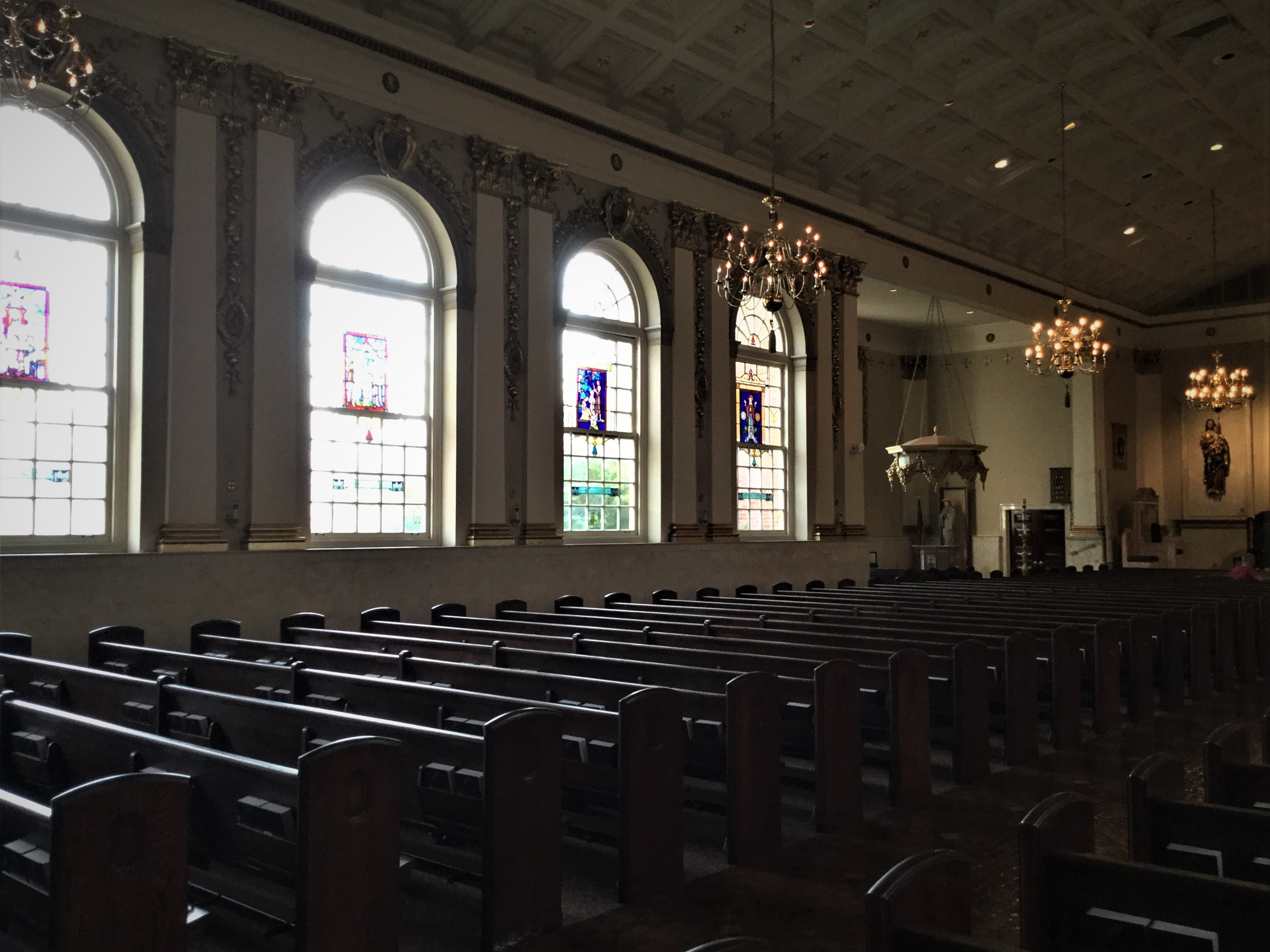
Stained Glass on the left side of Cathedral of Saint Catharine of Siena

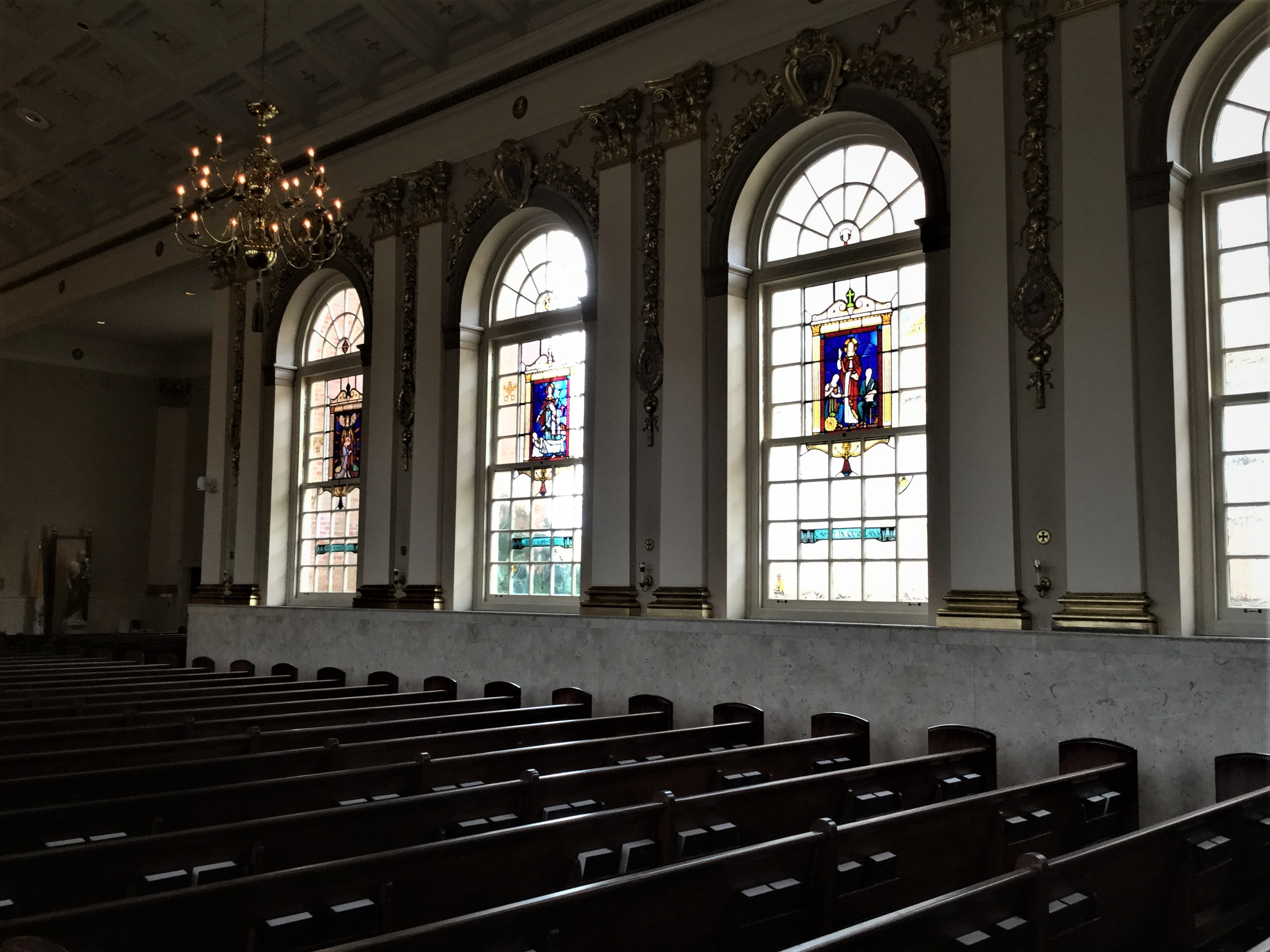
Stained Glass on the right side of Cathedral of Saint Catharine of Siena

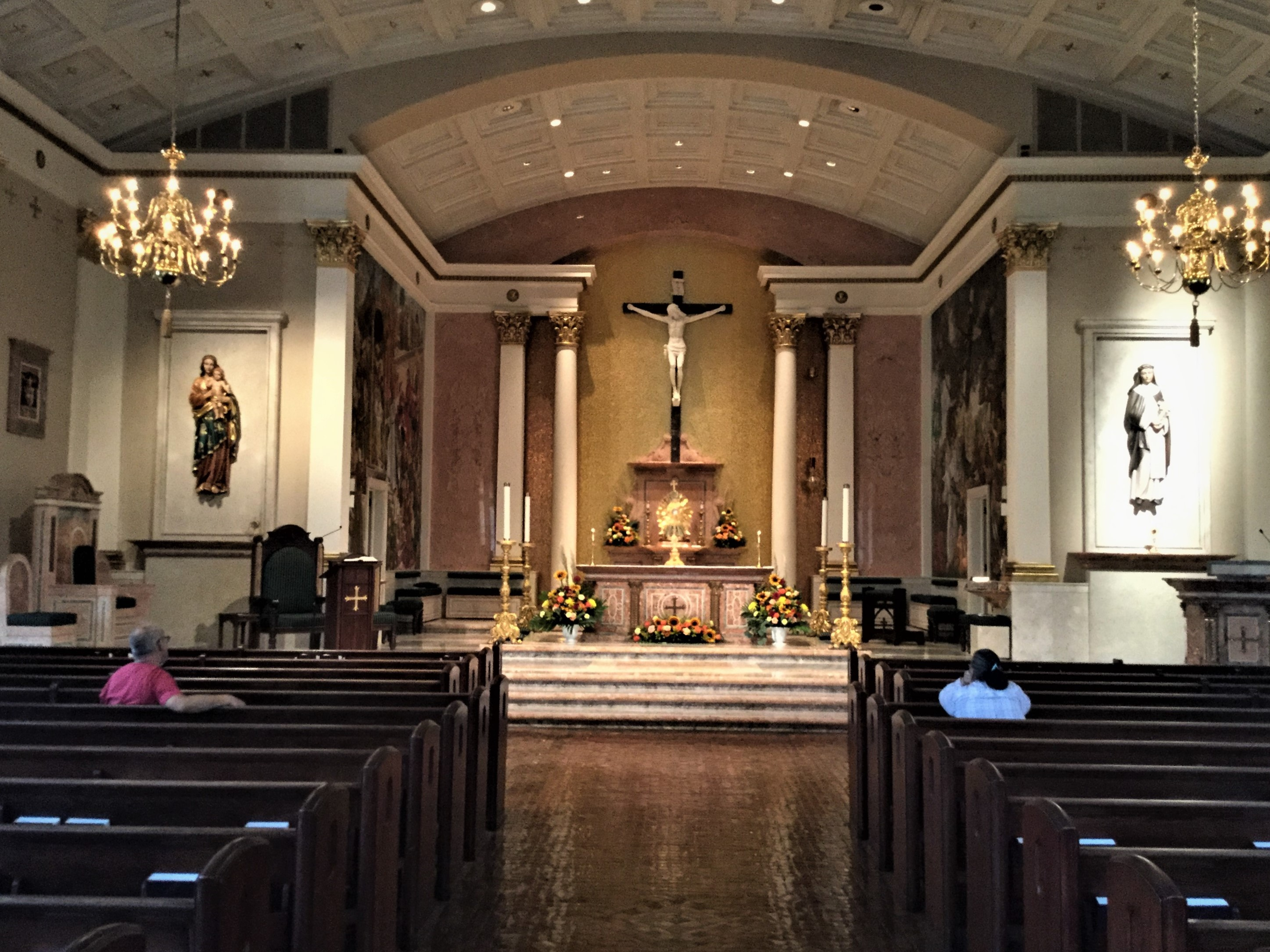
Closeup of the altar

== See also ==
- List of Catholic cathedrals in the United States
- List of cathedrals in the United States
- Roman Catholic Diocese of Allentown
