= Philip R. McDevitt =

American prelate (1858–1935)

His Excellency, The Most Reverend Philip Richard McDevitt
- Bishop of Harrisburg
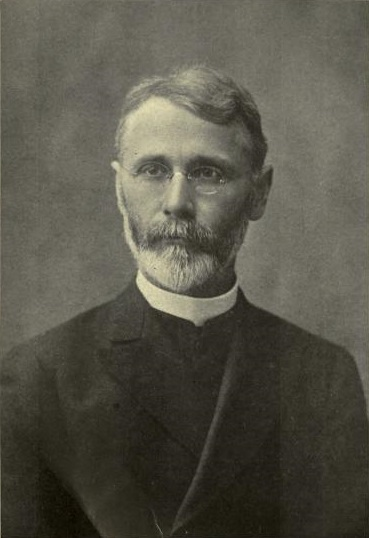
- McDevitt in 1910
- See: Diocese of Harrisburg
- Appointed: July 10, 1916
- Predecessor: John W. Shanahan
- Successor: George L. Leech

Orders
- Ordination: July 14, 1885 by Patrick John Ryan
- Consecration: September 21, 1916 by Edmond Francis Prendergast

Personal details
- Born: Philip Richard McDevitt; July 12, 1858 Philadelphia, Pennsylvania, US
- Died: November 11, 1935 (aged 77) Harrisburg, Pennsylvania, US
- Denomination: Roman Catholic
- Education: La Salle College; St. Charles Borromeo Seminary

Philip Richard McDevitt (July 12, 1858 – November 11, 1935) was an American prelate of the Roman Catholic Church. He served as bishop of the Diocese of Harrisburg in Pennsylvania from 1916 until his death.

== Biography ==
=== Early life ===
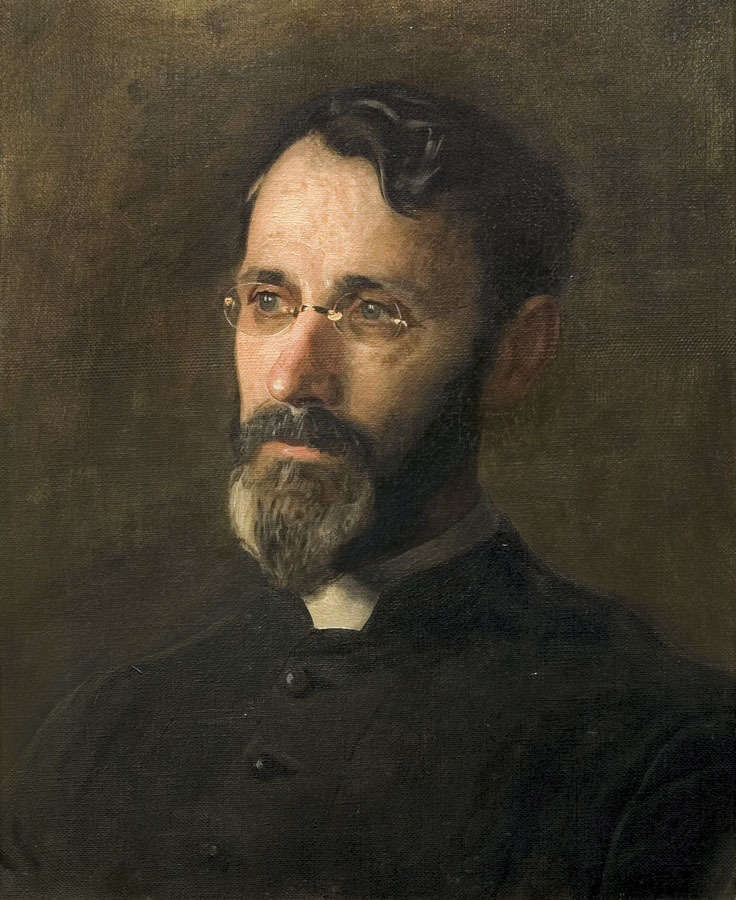
Portrait of Bishop McDevitt by Thomas Eakins (1901)

McDevitt was born on July 12, 1858, in Philadelphia, the son of Richard McDevitt and Mary Ann (née Dinneney) McDevitt. After graduating from La Salle College High School in Springfield Township, Pennsylvania, in 1877, he studied at La Salle College and St. Charles Borromeo Seminary, both in Philadelphia.

=== Priesthood ===
McDevitt was ordained to the priesthood for the Archdiocese of Philadelphia by Archbishop Patrick Ryan on July 14, 1885. After his ordination, the archdiocese assigned McDevitt as a curate at Nativity of the Blessed Virgin Mary Parish in Port Richmond, Philadelphia. He spent many hours working with students at the parish school on their publications and preparation for spelling bees. He was appointed superintendent of Catholic schools in the archdiocese in 1899.

In this position, McDevitt gained a national reputation as an educator and administrator. He was named a domestic prelate by Pope Pius X on July 16, 1910. He opened the first Catholic high school for girls in Philadelphia in 1912.

=== Bishop of Harrisburg ===
On July 10, 1916, McDevitt was appointed the fourth bishop of Harrisburg by Pope Benedict XV. He received his episcopal consecration on September 21, 1916, from Archbishop Edmond Francis Prendergast, with Bishops John McCort and John Fitzmaurice serving as co-consecrators.

During his 19-year tenure, McDevitt established ten parishes and twelve schools. In 1925, he created the Mission Board to respond to the financial distress of parishioners. He also served as chair of the Catholic Press Department within the National Catholic Welfare Conference in Washington, D.C, and president of the American Catholic Historical Association in Cleveland, Ohio.

=== Death and legacy ===
McDevitt died on November 11, 1935, at age 77. He is buried at Holy Cross Cemetery in Harrisburg.

McDevitt was instrumental in the construction of the new campus for Harrisburg Catholic High School in Harrisburg in 1930. It was renamed as Bishop McDevitt High School in 1957.

Bishop McDevitt High School in Wyncote, Pennsylvania, was also named after him.

Catholic Church titles
Preceded by John W. Shanahan	Bishop of Harrisburg; 1916—1935	Succeeded by George L. Leech
