= Eugene A. Garvey =

American prelate

His Excellency, The Right Reverend Eugene Augustine Garvey
- Bishop of Altoona
- Church: Catholic Church
- Diocese: Altoona
- Appointed: May 31, 1901
- Term ended: October 22, 1920 (his death)
- Predecessor: Office established
- Successor: John Joseph McCort

Orders
- Ordination: September 22, 1869 by William O'Hara
- Consecration: September 8, 1902 by Sebastiano Martinelli

Personal details
- Born: October 6, 1845 Carbondale, Pennsylvania, U.S.
- Died: October 22, 1920 (aged 75) Altoona, Pennsylvania, U.S.

Eugene Augustine Garvey (October 6, 1845 – October 22, 1920) was an American prelate of the Catholic Church. He was the first bishop of Altoona in Pennsylvania, serving from 1901 until his death in 1920.

== Biography ==
=== Early life and education ===
Garvey was born on October 6, 1845, in Carbondale, Pennsylvania, to Michael and Catherine (née Boylan) Garvey. His parents were both Irish immigrants, and his father was a rope worker for the Delaware and Hudson Railway and later the Pennsylvania Coal Company. One of five children, Garvey had a sister Margaret (later Sister Eugenia) who joined the Sisters of Charity and became superior of their convent in San Francisco, California.In 1850, Garvey moved with his family from Carbondale to nearby Dunmore, Pennsylvania. He later graduated from Scranton High School in Scranton, Pennsylvania.

After teaching for two years, Garvey decided to become a priest. He entered St. Charles College, a minor seminary at Ellicott City, Maryland, in 1865 to begin his preparation for the priesthood. He completed his theological studies at St. Charles Borromeo Seminary in Philadelphia, Pennsylvania. The Vatican erected the new Diocese of Scranton in 1868 and Garvey accepted an invitation from its bishop, William O'Hara to work there.

=== Priesthood ===
Garvey was ordained a priest in Scranton on September 22, 1869 for the Diocese of Scranton, by Bishop O'Hara. After his ordination, the diocese assigned Garvey as assistant pastor at the largely German-speaking parish of St. Mary's Parish in Honesdale, Pennsylvania. He also served the English-speaking Catholics of St. Philomena's Parish in Hawley, Pennsylvania. A year later in 1870, the diocese assigned him as pastor of Holy Ghost Parish in Athens, Pennsylvania.

In December 1871, Garvey was appointed to replace Reverend Michael P. Stack as pastor of Annunciation Parish in Williamsport. O'Hara had removed Stack due to his mismanagement of parish affairs; Stack then sued O'Hara. Despite taking charge of Annunciation amid a contentious situation, Garvey eliminated its debt and built a new church, rectory, and parochial school. Garvey also established Mount Carmel Cemetery in Williamsport and a convent for the Sisters of the Immaculate Heart of Mary.

After 27 years at Williamsport, Garvey was named vicar general of the diocese and pastor of St. John's Parish in Pittston, Pennsylvania, in March 1899. He was given the title of monsignor by Pope Leo XIII in 1900. Before his eventual appointment as bishop, Garvey had been proposed as a successor to O'Hara, Bishop Thomas McGovern of Harrisburg, and Bishop Tobias Mullen of Erie.

=== Bishop of Altoona ===
On May 31, 1901, Garvey was appointed the first bishop of the newly created Diocese of Altoona by Pope Leo XIII. He received his episcopal consecration on September 8, 1901, from Archbishop Sebastiano Martinelli, with Bishops Michael John Hoban and John Edmund Fitzmaurice serving as co-consecrators, at St. Peter's Cathedral in Scranton.

Garvey formally took charge of the diocese on September 24, 1901, when he was installed at St. John's Pro-Cathedral in Altoona. The new diocese covered over 6,000 square miles in Central and Western Pennsylvania, including the counties of Cambria, Blair, Bedford, Huntingdon, and Somerset taken from the Diocese of Pittsburgh and the counties of Centre, Clinton, and Fulton taken from the Diocese of Harrisburg.

In Garvey's first full year as bishop in 1902, the Diocese of Altoona contained 59 priests serving 44 parishes and 23 parochial schools with 6,000 students. The Catholic population was approximately 44,000. By his final year as bishop in 1920, the diocese had 148 priests working in 91 parishes and 42 parochial schools with 11,369 students and a Catholic population of 123,756.

Garvey's health began to fail in 1917. In 1920, the Vatican appointed Bishop John Joseph McCort as a coadjutor bishop, with the right of succession, to assist Garvey. In October 1920, Garvey collapsed and fell into a coma. He died a few days later at his residence in Altoona on October 22, 1920, aged 75.

Catholic Church titles
| Preceded by none | Bishop of Altoona; 1901–1920 | Succeeded by John Joseph McCort |
