= John Joseph McCort =

American prelate

His Excellency, The Most Reverend John Joseph McCort
- Bishop of Altoona
- Church: Catholic Church
- Diocese: Altoona
- Appointed: October 22, 1920
- Term ended: April 21, 1936 (his death)
- Predecessor: Eugene A. Garvey
- Successor: Richard Thomas Guilfoyle
- Other posts: Auxiliary Bishop of Philadelphia (1912-1920); Coadjutor Bishop of Altoona (1920)

Orders
- Ordination: October 14, 1883 by Jeremiah F. Shanahan
- Consecration: September 17, 1912 by Edmond Francis Prendergast

Personal details
- Born: February 16, 1860 Philadelphia, Pennsylvania, U.S.
- Died: April 21, 1936 (aged 76) Johnstown, Pennsylvania, U.S.

John Joseph McCort (February 16, 1860 – April 21, 1936) was an American prelate of the Catholic Church. He served as Bishop of Altoona in Pennsylvania from 1920 until his death in 1936.

== Biography ==
=== Early life and education ===
John McCort was born on February 16, 1860, in Philadelphia, Pennsylvania, to James and Sarah (née McCrystal) McCort, who were natives of Ireland. His father died during the American Civil War, having enlisted in the 110th Pennsylvania Infantry Regiment of the Union Army. McCort received his early education under the Christian Brothers at the parochial school of St. Michael's Parish; that school later became La Salle College High School. After completing his courses there, McCort studied at La Salle College in Philadelphia and then entered St. Charles Borromeo Seminary in Philadelphia in 1876 to prepare for the priesthood.

=== Priesthood ===
McCort was ordained a priest for the Archdiocese of Philadelphia on October 14, 1883, by Bishop Jeremiah F. Shanahan. A few months shy of the canonical age of 24, McCort was granted a special dispensation from the Vatican to be ordained due to health issues. Following his ordination, the archdiocese assigned McCort to the faculty of St. Charles Borromeo Seminary, where he taught Latin, rhetoric, mathematics, Catholic history, and liturgy for the next 16 years. In June 1899, he was appointed to succeed John W. Shanahan as pastor of Our Mother of Sorrows Parish in the Mill Creek neighborhood of West Philadelphia.

McCort served as pastor of Our Mother of Sorrows until 1920. He was named fiscal procurator of the archdiocese in 1905, a monsignor in 1910, and vicar general in 1911.

=== Auxiliary Bishop of Philadelphia ===
On June 28, 1912, McCort was appointed auxiliary bishop of Philadelphia and titular bishop of Azotus by Pope Pius X. He received his episcopal consecration on September 17, 1912, from Archbishop Edmond Francis Prendergast, with Bishops John W. Shanahan and John Edmund Fitzmaurice serving as co-consecrators, at the Cathedral of Saints Peter and Paul in Philadelphia As auxiliary bishop, he assisted Prendergast with the administration of the archdiocese while retaining his role as pastor of Our Mother of Sorrows. He was instrumental in founding Misericordia Hospital (now Mercy Philadelphia Hospital) and West Philadelphia Catholic High School for Boys.

On June 22, 1916, McCort was notified of his appointment as Bishop of Monterey-Los Angeles by Pope Benedict XV. However, Prendergast wrote to the Holy See with McCort's consent, asking that the appointment be rescinded, so that McCort could continue to assist the ailing Prendergast in Philadelphia. Benedict XV accepted Prendergast's request in November 1916.

Following Prendergast's death in February 1918, there was considerable public support in Philadelphia for McCort's appointment as archbishop. However, the appointment ultimately went to Dennis Joseph Dougherty, the Bishop of Buffalo and McCort's former student at St. Charles Borromeo Seminary. McCort had a strained relationship with Dougherty, especially after McCort resigned from several diocesan positions following Dougherty's appointment.

=== Bishop of Altoona ===
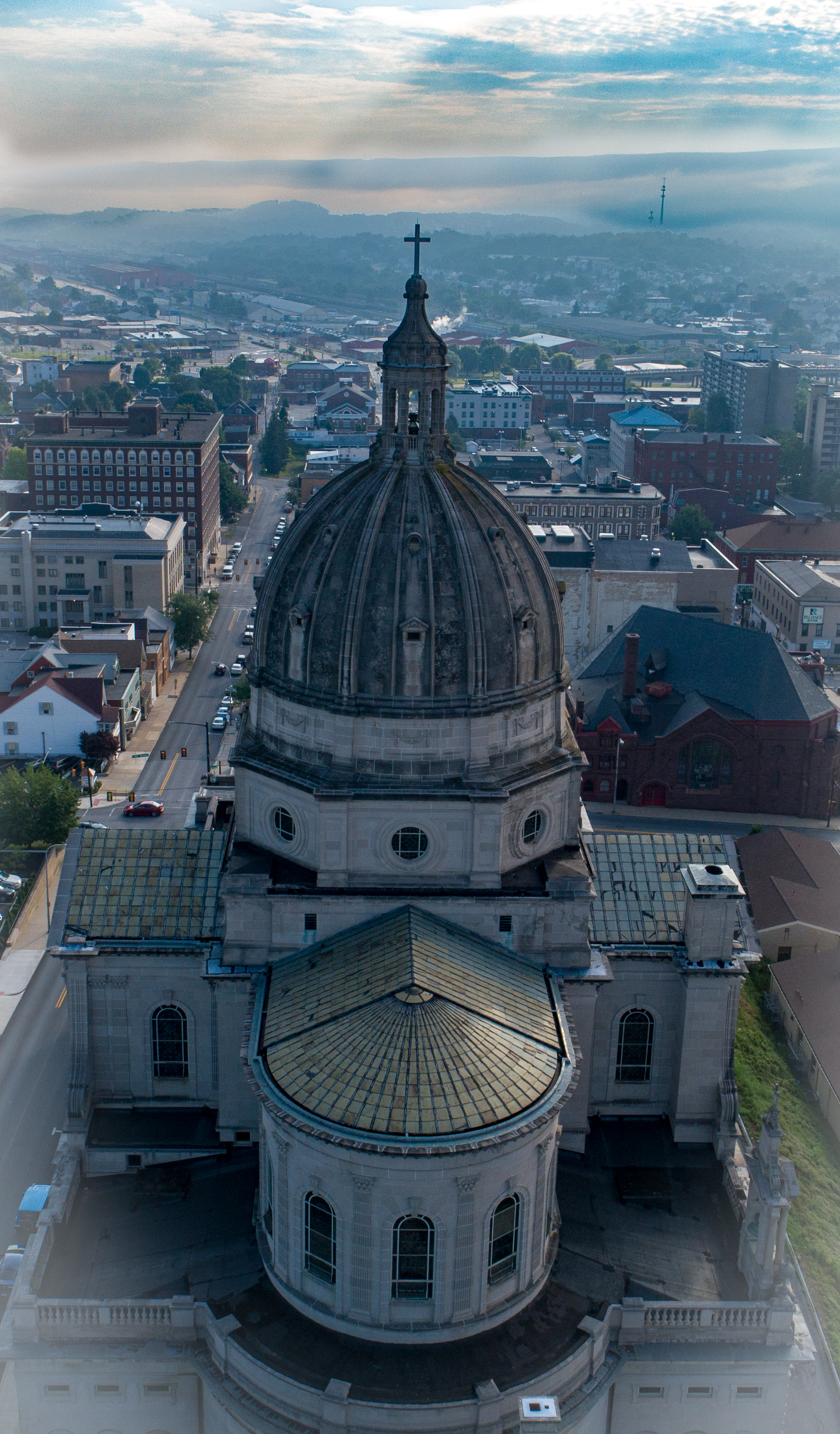
Cathedral of the Blessed Sacrament, Altoona, Pennsylvania (2018)

On January 27, 1920, McCort was appointed coadjutor bishop with the right of succession to Bishop Eugene A. Garvey of Altoona. Upon Garvey's death on October 22, 1920, McCort succeeded him as the second bishop of Altoona.

Upon McCort's arrival in 1920, the Diocese of Altoona contained 148 priests, 110 churches, 91 parishes, 42 parochial schools, and a Catholic population of 123,756. By the time of his death in 1936, there were 197 priests, 129 churches, 111 parishes, 50 parochial schools, and a Catholic population that had fallen to 100,634 during the Great Depression. In 1922, McCort established Altoona Catholic High School (now Bishop Guilfoyle High School) and Johnstown Catholic High School in Johnstown, Pennsylvania. McCort laid the cornerstone for the new Cathedral of the Blessed Sacrament in May 1926, but construction temporarily halted in 1929 due to the stock market crash. The cathedral was finally dedicated in September 1931.

On the occasion of his golden jubilee as a priest in October 1933, McCort was named an assistant to the papal throne by Pope Pius XI.

=== Death and legacy ===
In February 1936, McCort was admitted to Mercy Hospital in Johnstown after receiving injuries from a fall during a visit to Philadelphia. His health began to fail and he was in a coma for several days before his death in Johnstown on April 21, 1936. He is buried in the crypt of the Cathedral of the Blessed Sacrament.

Johnstown Catholic High School is now Bishop McCort Catholic Academy.

Catholic Church titles
Preceded by Eugene A. Garvey	Bishop of Altoona; 1920–1936	Succeeded by Richard Thomas Guilfoyle
Preceded by –	Auxiliary Bishop of Philadelphia; 1912–1920	Succeeded by –
