= John W. Shanahan =

American prelate (1846–1916)

His Excellency, The Right Reverend John Walter Shanahan
- Bishop of Harrisburg
- See: Diocese of Harrisburg
- In office: 1899-1916
- Predecessor: Thomas McGovern
- Successor: Philip R. McDevitt

Orders
- Ordination: January 2, 1869 by Jeremiah F. Shanahan
- Consecration: May 1, 1900 by Patrick John Ryan

Personal details
- Born: January 3, 1846 Silver Lake Township, Pennsylvania, US
- Died: February 19, 1916 (aged 70)
- Denomination: Roman Catholic
- Parents: John and Margaret (née Donovan) Shanahan
- Education: St. Charles Borromeo Seminary
- Motto: Non recuso laborem (I do not refuse the labor)

John Walter Shanahan (January 3, 1846 – February 19, 1916) was an American prelate of the Roman Catholic Church. He served as bishop of the Diocese of Harrisburg in Pennsylvania from 1899 until his death in 1916.

== Biography ==
=== Early life ===
John Shanahan was born on January 3, 1846, in Silver Lake Township, Pennsylvania, to John and Margaret (née Donovan) Shanahan, who immigrated to the United States from County Cork, Ireland. His brother Jeremiah Shanahan was the first bishop of Harrisburg, serving between 1868 and his death in 1886.John Shanahan studied at St. Charles Borromeo Seminary in Philadelphia, Pennsylvania.

=== Priesthood ===
John Shanahan was ordained to the priesthood for the Diocese of Philadelphia by Jeremiah Shanahan, on January 2, 1869. John Shanahan served as superintendent of Catholic schools in Philadelphia.

=== Bishop of Harrisburg ===
On January 2, 1899, Shanahan was appointed the third bishop of Harrisburg by Pope Leo XIII. He received his episcopal consecration at Saints Peter and Paul Cathedral in Philadelphia on May 1, 1899, from Archbishop Patrick Ryan, with Bishops Ignatius Horstmann and Edmond Prendergast serving as co-consecrators.

During his 16-year-long tenure, Shanahan erected 27 new parishes and increased the number of priests from 74 to 120. He opened an orphanage for girls at Sylvan Heights and a protectory for boys at Abbottstown, Pennsylvania, and completed construction on the Cathedral of St. Patrick in Harrisburg in 1907. In 1907, Shanaha founded the Sisters of Saint Casimir. He also established the motherhouses of the Sisters of the Most Precious Blood and the Sisters of Saints Cyril and Methodius, and invited to the diocese the Franciscan Sisters of Saint Joseph and the Immaculate Heart Sisters of Scranton.

John Shanahan died on February 19, 1916, at age 70.

=== Legacy ===
Bishop Shanahan High School in Downingtown, Pennsylvania was named in honor of Shanahan.

Catholic Church titles
Preceded by Thomas McGovern	Bishop of Harrisburg; 1899—1916	Succeeded by Philip R. McDevitt
