= Bishop Shanahan High School =

Private school in Downingtown, Pennsylvania, United States

Location
- 220 Woodbine Road; Downingtown, (Chester County), Pennsylvania 19335; United States; 40.0093°N 75.6876°W

Information
- Former name: Saint Agnes Parish High School (1909–1956)
- Type: Private, Coeducational
- Motto: Quae sursum sunt quaerite (Seek the things that are found above)
- Religious affiliation: Roman Catholic
- Patron saint: St. Francis Xavier
- Established: 1909 (as St. Agnes High School); 1957 (as Bishop Shanahan High School)
- Oversight: Archdiocese of Philadelphia
- President: Teresa Dellicompagni
- Principal: Dr. Robert W. Moran, Ed.D.
- Chaplain: Rev. Shane M. Flanagan
- Faculty: 49.6 (on an FTE basis)
- Grades: 9–12
  - Grade 9: 211
  - Grade 10: 212
  - Grade 11: 232
  - Grade 12: 253
- Student to teacher ratio: 18.3
- Campus size: 80 acres
- Colors: Green and white
- Slogan: "People of God; People for Others"
- Athletics conference: PIAA District One, Ches-Mont League (National Division)
- Nickname: Eagles
- Accreditation: Middle States Association of Colleges and Schools
- Publication: Shanahan (school magazine)
- Newspaper: Shanaviews
- Yearbook: Aquila
- Tuition: $10,200 (2024–2025)
- Website: www.shanahan.org

Bishop Shanahan High School (BSHS) is a coeducational Catholic secondary school of the Archdiocese of Philadelphia, located in Downingtown, Pennsylvania. The school is named after Right Rev. John W. Shanahan, the third bishop of the Diocese of Harrisburg, and is the only archdiocesan secondary school in Chester County. The school originally opened in 1957 in West Chester, and moved to its current campus in Downingtown in 1998.

The current president of Bishop Shanahan is Teresa Dellicompagni, who has served in the role since July 1, 2024. The current principal is Dr. Robert W. Moran, Ed.D., who has served in the role since July 7, 2022.

== History ==
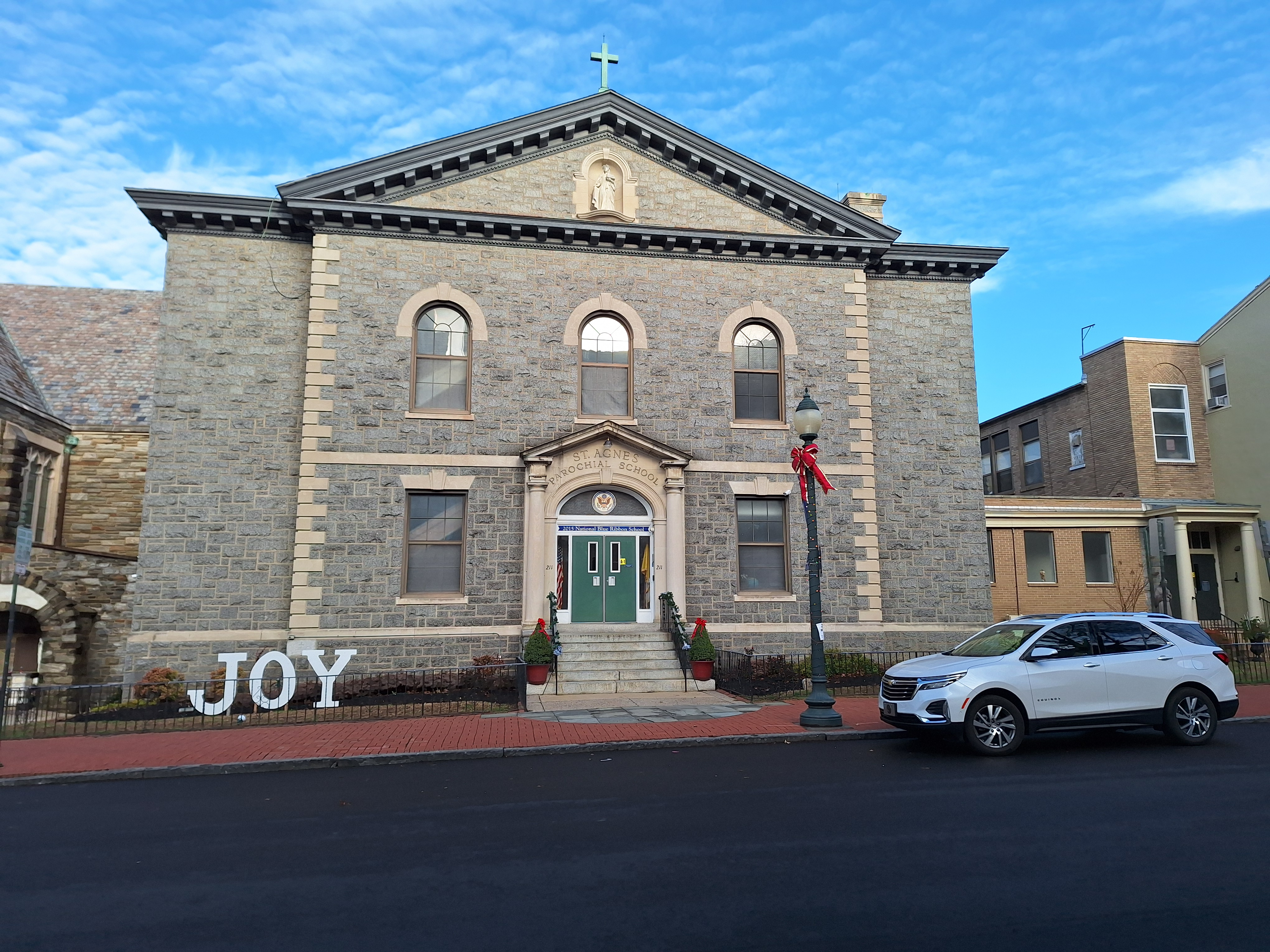
Present-day St. Agnes Parochial School, the site of the original St. Agnes High School from 1909 to 1956.

The predecessor to Bishop Shanahan High School was Saint Agnes Parish High School, which was originally founded in 1909 by Monsignor Henry C. Schuyler. The school was located on the grounds of St. Agnes Parish in downtown West Chester, Pennsylvania, and was run by the Sisters, Servants of the Immaculate Heart of Mary (I.H.M.).

In the 1950s, plans were made to construct a new school building in order to accommodate growing enrollment. The town's local Knights of Columbus council donated a nearby parcel of land, and ground was broken in 1956 on the new building, which would open one year later. On September 9, 1957, Cardinal John Francis O'Hara dedicated the new school as "Bishop Shanahan High School", honoring the late Bishop John W. Shanahan of the Diocese of Harrisburg. An addition to the building was completed in 1980, bringing its size up to 62,000 square feet.

From 1980 to 1997, Chester County saw a 40% increase in its Catholic population. The rise in population resulted in a dramatic increase in enrollment at Bishop Shanahan, which was the only archdiocesan high school in the county. By 1995, the school was operating above capacity and was forced to install portable classrooms to accommodate overcrowding conditions. In that same year, plans were developed to construct a new and larger school on one of two Archdiocese-owned properties in nearby Downingtown. Downingtown was ultimately chosen to be the location of the new school due to its central location within the county, along with its proximity to the US 30 bypass, allowing for easier access to the school for residents of Exton and western portions of the county. Ground was broken on the new, $30 million school on October 27, 1996, with Cardinal Anthony Bevilacqua presiding over the ceremony.

The new Bishop Shanahan High School opened to students in September 1998. Upon its opening, the new building was 220,000 square feet, over three times larger than the previous building, and could accommodate up to 1,200 students. In addition, the new school featured a 60-seat chapel, a 14,000 square-foot gymnasium, a 5,000 square-foot library, a 1,200 seat auditorium, 31 classrooms, and additional athletic fields throughout the 80-acre campus. Upon the time of the previous building's closure in 1997, the school had experienced an enrollment increase of nearly 200 students since 1993. When the new building opened, enrollment continued to grow, and a two-story expansion was completed in 2001 to provide 14 additional classrooms, bringing capacity up to 1,600 students.

In 2005, a 2,000-seat football stadium was completed on the campus of the school. Further upgrades to the stadium in 2015 provided lighting, a resurfaced track, and a new synthetic turf field.

In 2023, the school was awarded the National Certificate for STEM Excellence (NCSE) from the National Institute for STEM Education (NISE), becoming the first high school in Pennsylvania and the first Catholic high school nationwide to receive the certification. Additionally, the NISE awarded six teachers at the school with a National Certificate in STEM Teaching.

== Academics ==
Bishop Shanahan offers three levels of course difficulty, including college prep (CP) and honors, along with Advanced Placement (AP) for select courses. Students also have the opportunity to take dual enrollment courses at nearby colleges, including Immaculata University and Neumann University. The school also offers STEM-focused courses, along with partnering with a local technical school to offer courses on specific trades.

Bishop Shanahan's most recent graduating class of 2024 amassed a total of over $53 million in scholarship awards from colleges and universities.

== Extracurricular activities ==
Bishop Shanahan has over 30 clubs and extracurricular activities. Some of these include: academic bowl, community service corps, DECA, language clubs, mock trial, mathletes, world affairs club, and yearbook club.

The school hosts the Monsignor Schuyler Chapter of the National Honor Society, named after Monsignor Henry C. Schuyler, who founded the original St. Agnes High School.

The fine arts department at Bishop Shanahan offers multiple bands, choruses, and art courses. The department also puts on an annual fall musical, with the most recent production being Grease.

== Athletics ==
Bishop Shanahan High School is a member of the Pennsylvania Interscholastic Athletic Association (PIAA) Division One, where they compete in the National Division of the Ches-Mont League. Bishop Shanahan is the only non-public school in the Ches-Mont League, as other schools in their division include: Avon Grove, Coatesville, Downingtown East and West, Henderson, and West Chester East.

The current athletic director of Bishop Shanahan is Paul Meyers, who also serves as the school's head football coach. The school participates in 18 varsity sports.

On April 25, 2023, the Bishop Shanahan boys' lacrosse team defeated Oxford Area High School, 11–1, earning Shanahan's head coach Jon Heisman his 513th win as a head coach, a Pennsylvania high school lacrosse record.

== Feeder schools ==
As the only Archdiocesan secondary school in Chester County, Bishop Shanahan draws from a large geographic area, with many Catholic elementary schools in the county serving as feeder schools. Some feeder schools include:

- Assumption B.V.M. School in West Grove
- Pope John Paul II Regional School in West Brandywine
- SS. Peter and Paul School in West Chester
- SS. Philip and James School in Exton
- SS. Simon and Jude School in West Chester
- St. Agnes School in West Chester
- St. Elizabeth School in Chester Springs
- St. Joseph School in Downingtown
- St. Maximillian Kolbe School in West Chester
- St. Norbert School in Paoli
- St. Patrick School in Malvern

== Notable alumni ==
- Doug Costin, NFL defensive tackle
- Josh Hoey, track and field athlete
- Fred Mascherino, guitarist
- Muffet McGraw, Hall of Fame women's basketball coach
- Mary Kate Morrissey, Broadway actress
