= Cathedral of Saint Patrick (Harrisburg, Pennsylvania) =

Historic church in Pennsylvania, United States

Cathedral of St. Patrick
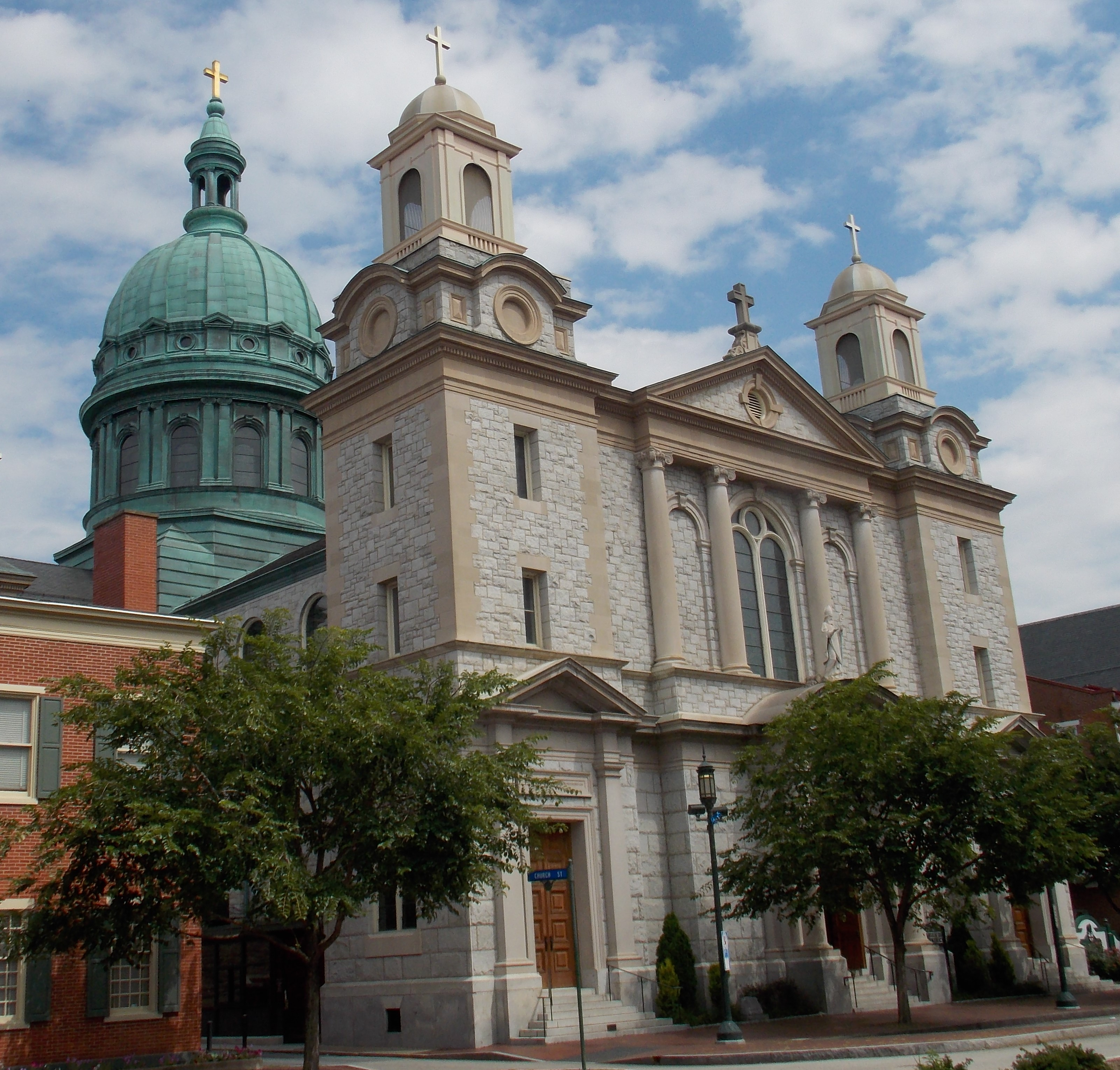
- Cathedral of St. Patrick
- 40°15′49.32″N 76°53′11.04″W
- Location: 212 State St. Harrisburg, Pennsylvania
- Country: United States
- Denomination: Roman Catholic
- Website: www.stpatrickcathedral.com

History
- Status: Cathedral/Parish
- Dedication: Saint Patrick

Architecture
- Architect: George I. Lovatt, Sr.
- Style: Baroque Revival
- Groundbreaking: 1904
- Completed: 1907
- Construction cost: $250,000

Specifications
- Materials: Granite

Administration
- Diocese: Harrisburg

Clergy
- Bishop: Most Rev. Timothy C. Senior
- Rector: Reverend Joshua R. Brommer
- Cathedral of Saint Patrick
- U.S. Historic district – Contributing property
- Location within Pennsylvania Location within the United States
- Part of: Harrisburg Historic District (ID76001632)
- Added to NRHP: January 19, 1976

The Cathedral of Saint Patrick is a cathedral of the Catholic Church in downtown Harrisburg, Pennsylvania, United States. It is the mother church of the Diocese of Harrisburg and is the seat of its bishop. It is a contributing property in the Harrisburg Historic District on the National Register of Historic Places.

== History ==
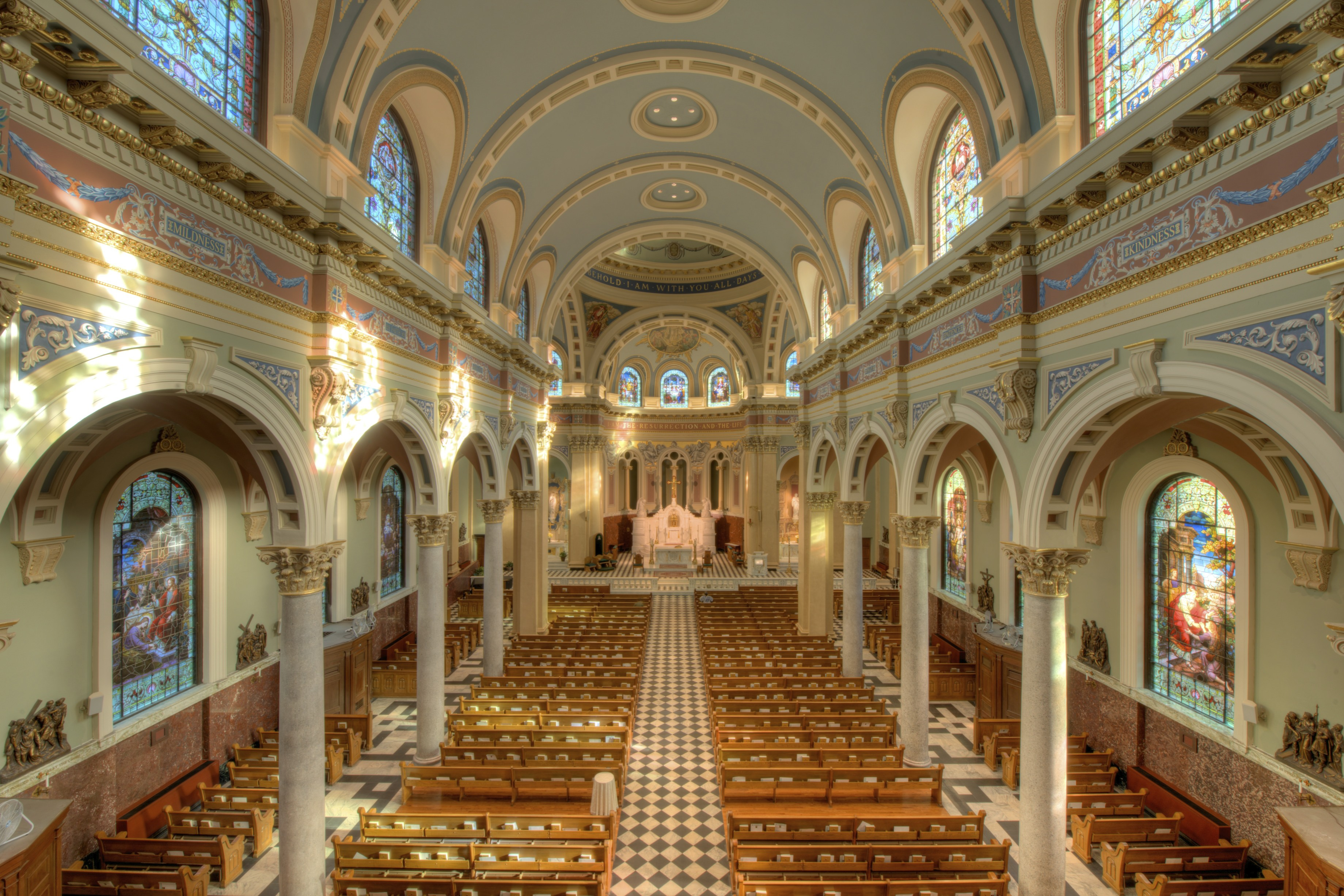
View up the nave to the sanctuary

Catholicism came to Central Pennsylvania before the American Revolutionary War. German Jesuits established the Conewago Chapel (1730) and St. Mary's Church (1743) in Lancaster. By 1806 there was a small Catholic mission in Harrisburg. Property in Allison Hill was bought in 1813 and a chapel was built on the site. As Harrisburg began to develop, Irish immigrants arrived in town. The Rev. Patrick Leary bought property on State Street in 1824, and the cornerstone for the first St. Patrick's church was laid two years later. The church was built for $6,500. The parish was visited by St. John Neumann, who was the bishop of Philadelphia and therefore the parish's bishop, in 1855 and 1857.

The Diocese of Harrisburg was established by Pope Pius IX on March 3, 1868. St. Patrick's was named the pro-cathedral of the new diocese. Bishop John W. Shanahan proposed at a diocesan synod in 1902 that a permanent cathedral be built in the diocese. A committee was formed and they accepted the plans of Philadelphia architect George I. Lovatt, Sr. Bodies that had been buried in the parish cemetery had to be relocated to the new Mount Calvary Cemetery. Ground was broken for the new church in 1904 and it was completed on March 1, 1907. The cathedral was built for $250,000. The church was listed on the National Register of Historic Places as a contributing property in the Harrisburg Historic District in 1976.

== Architecture ==
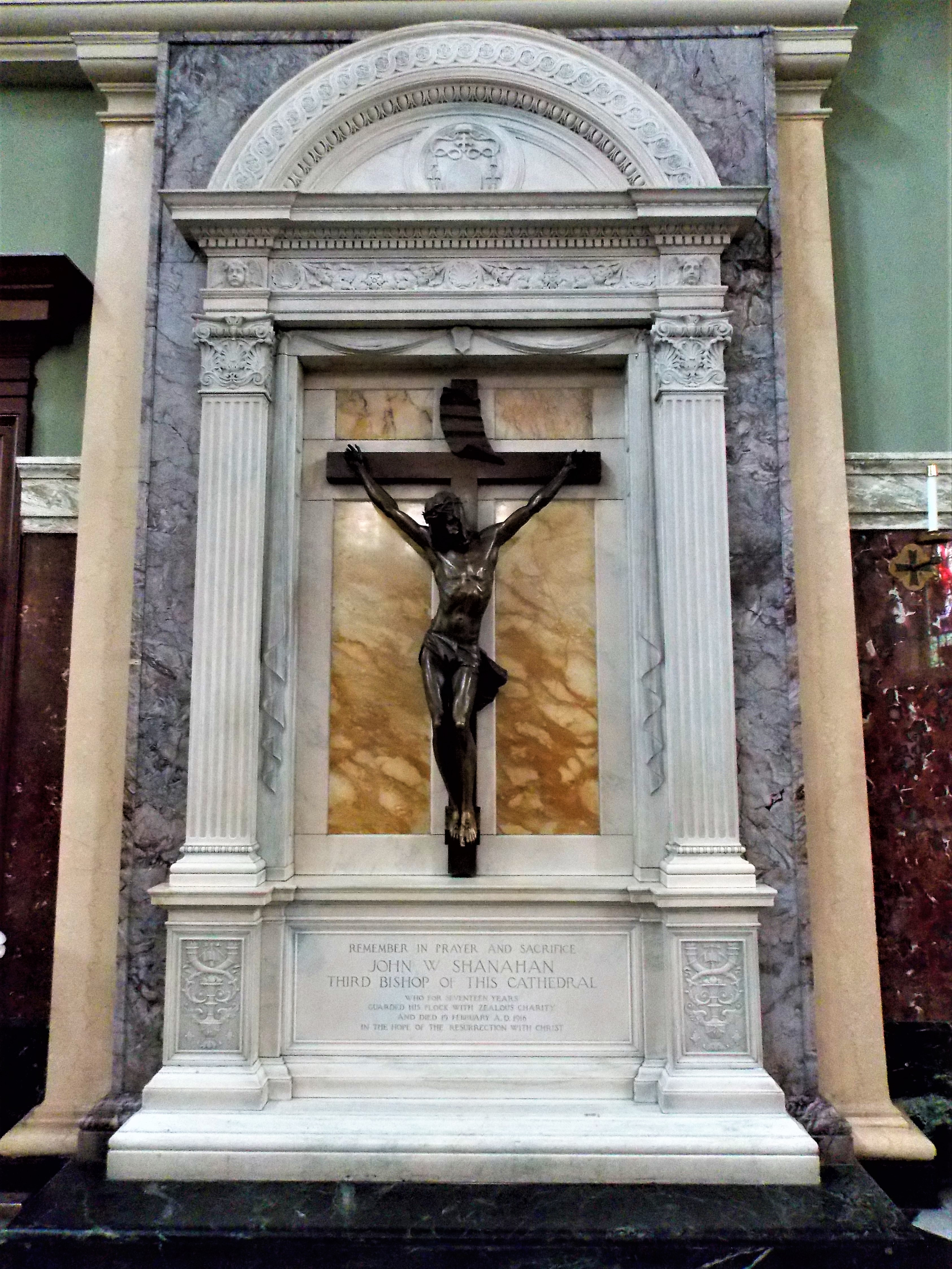
Bishop John W. Shanahan Memorial (bronze, 1916–18) by Samuel Murray. The two-thirds-life-size bronze crucifix is located at the rear of the nave.

St. Patrick's Cathedral was designed in the Baroque Revival style with Renaissance Revival influences and capped with a classically influenced dome. The exterior of the building is covered in granite from North Carolina. The interior featured wainscoting covered in oriental marble topped with Connemara marble. The main nave is flanked by granite columns that support a vaulted ceiling. There are forty-four stained glass windows in the nave that were imported from Munich, Germany. The original altar was patterned after the Bernini altar found in the Chapel of the Blessed Sacrament in St. Peter's Basilica, Rome. The original pulpit featured carved figures that were patterned after a fresco found in the Roman Catacombs. It showed the four evangelists with the Lamb of God standing on the Mystic mount.

The cathedral has undergone a couple of major renovations in its history. In the 1949-1950 project the altar was simplified and the chancel was renovated to provide more space. The interior of the church was frescoed including the four Western Fathers of the Church, Jerome, Augustine of Hippo, Gregory the Great and Ambrose, which embellish the pendentives beneath the dome. An inscription was added to the lower part of the dome which reads: "Behold, I am with you all days, even to the consummation of the world." The shrines of the Blessed Virgin Mary and Saint Joseph were given chiaroscuro backdrops. The Stations of the Cross were created in simulated bronze with gold highlights and were recessed in the wall. The chancel was modified in 1976. A new free-standing altar was created from the high altar and located closer to the congregation. The tabernacle was placed at a new Altar of Repose, a new ambo (pulpit) was installed, and the cathedra (bishop's chair) was relocated to a more central position.

Over the years several shrines were added to the cathedral in memory of the bishops of Harrisburg. Bishop John W. Shanahan is honored with a bronze crucifix, which was placed in the rear of the cathedral. Bishop Philip R. McDevitt is honored with a shrine depicting Christ teaching the children, Bishop George L. Leech was honored with the shrine of Saint Elizabeth Ann Seton and Bishop Joseph T. Daley was honored with the shrine of Saint John Neumann. A shrine to Saint Katherine Drexel is located in the cathedral portico.

== See also ==
- List of Catholic cathedrals in the United States
- List of cathedrals in the United States
