= Jeremiah F. Shanahan =

American prelate (1834–1886)

His Excellency, The Right Reverend Jeremiah Francis Shanahan
- Bishop of Harrisburg
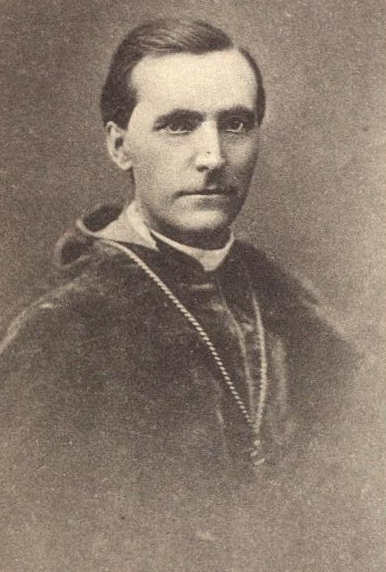
- Church: Roman Catholic Church
- See: Diocese of Harrisburg
- In office: July 12, 1868 – September 24, 1886
- Predecessor: none
- Successor: Thomas McGovern

Orders
- Ordination: July 3, 1859 by John Neumann
- Consecration: July 12, 1868 by James Frederick Wood

Personal details
- Born: July 17, 1834 Silver Lake, Pennsylvania, US
- Died: September 24, 1886 (aged 52) Harrisburg, Pennsylvania, US
- Education: St. Charles Borromeo Seminary
- Motto: Serviam (I will serve)

Jeremiah Francis Shanahan (July 17, 1834 – September 24, 1886) was an American prelate of the Roman Catholic Church. He served as the first bishop of the Diocese of Harrisburg in Pennsylvania from 1868 until his death in 1886.

== Biography ==
=== Early life ===
Jeremiah Shanahan was born on July 17, 1834, in Silver Lake, Pennsylvania, to John and Margaret (née Donovan) Shanahan, who immigrated to the United States from County Cork, Ireland. His younger brother was John W. Shanahan, who also served as bishop of Harrisburg (1899–1916).

After graduating from St. Joseph's Academy near Binghamton, New York, in 1852, Jeremiah Shanahan entered St. Charles Borromeo Seminary in Philadelphia, Pennsylvania.

=== Priesthood ===
Shanahan was ordained to the priesthood for the Diocese of Philadelphia by Bishop John Neumann on July 3, 1859. He then served as curate at the Cathedral of Sts. Peter and Paul in Philadelphia and rector of the preparatory seminary in Glen Riddle, Pennsylvania.

=== Bishop of Harrisburg ===
On March 3, 1868, Shanahan was appointed the first bishop of the newly erected Diocese of Harrisburg by Pope Pius IX. He received his episcopal consecration on July 12, 1868, from Bishop James Frederick Wood, with Bishops John McGill and Michael Domenec serving as co-consecrators, at Saints Peter and Paul Cathedral.The new diocese included 25,000 Catholics served by 22 priests, with 40 churches and missions, and seven parochial schools.

Upon arriving in Harrisburg, Shanahan designated St. Patrick's Church in Harrisburg as his cathedral. He opened Sylvan Heights Seminary at Harrisburg in October 1883. Shanahan introduced into the diocese the Sisters of Mercy, the Sisters of St. Joseph, the Sisters of Christian Charity, the Sisters of the Holy Cross, and the Sisters of Charity. By the time of his death, the diocese had 51 priests, 51 churches, 75 chapels and missions, three orphanages, 29 parochial schools, and over 35,000 Catholics.

=== Death and legacy ===
Shanahan died on September 24, 1886, in Harrisburg at age 52.

Catholic Church titles
Preceded by none	Bishop of Harrisburg; 1868–1886	Succeeded by Thomas McGovern
