= Bishop McDevitt High School (Harrisburg, Pennsylvania) =

Location
- 1 Crusader Way; Harrisburg, Pennsylvania 17111; United States; 40°16′29.8″N 76°47′30″W

Information
- Type: Private high school
- Motto: Religione sapientia colitur (In Religion's Garden Grows Wisdom)
- Religious affiliation: Roman Catholic
- Established: 1918; 108 years ago
- Oversight: Roman Catholic Diocese of Harrisburg
- Principal: Vincent Harper
- Teaching staff: 26.5 (on an FTE basis) (2017–18)
- Grades: 9–12
- Gender: Co-educational
- Enrollment: 757 (2022–23)
- Student to teacher ratio: 15:1 (2021–22)
- Colors: Navy and Vegas gold
- Athletics conference: PIAA District 3
- Mascot: Crusader
- Nickname: Crusaders
- Accreditation: Middle States Association of Colleges and Schools
- Publication: The Larch
- Newspaper: The Twin Towers
- Yearbook: Pridwen
- Website: www.bishopmcdevitt.org

Bishop McDevitt High School is a private, Roman Catholic, co-educational high school in Lower Paxton Township, Pennsylvania, United States. It was founded in 1918 as "Catholic High School" in Harrisburg and renamed in 1957 to honor the memory of the Most Reverend Philip R. McDevitt, fourth bishop of Harrisburg and founder of the school.

It is located in the Roman Catholic Diocese of Harrisburg.

== History ==
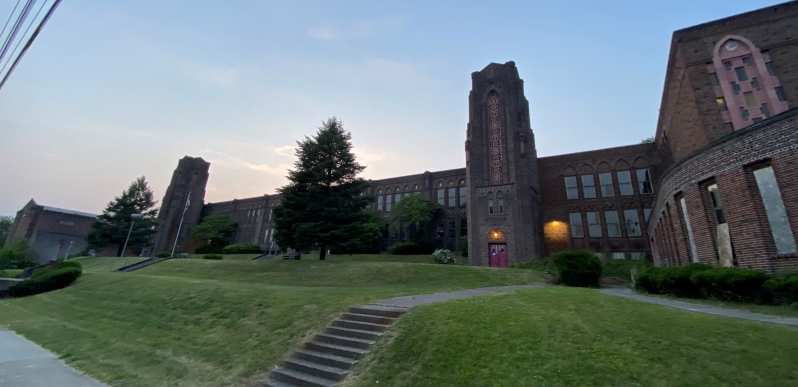
The former Bishop McDevitt HS building as seen in 2023

Founded in 1918, this private, Pennsylvania high school was renamed in 1957 to honor the memory of the Most Reverend Philip R. McDevitt, fourth bishop of Harrisburg and founder of the school.

On January 7, 2013, the new Bishop McDevitt High School opened on 1 Crusader Way in Lower Paxton Township. It replaced the historic building at 2200 Market Street in Harrisburg after 83 years.

== Athletics ==
Bishop McDevitt is a part of Pennsylvania Interscholastic Athletic Association District 3. McDevitt is known for its athletics, especially the football team. Other sports at Bishop McDevitt include: Boys & Girls Basketball, Boys & Girls Soccer, Coed Cross Country, Coed Track & Field, Coed Golf, Field Hockey, Boys & Girls Tennis, Wrestling, Coed Swimming, Coed Bowling, Cheerleading, Ice Hockey, Volleyball, Baseball, Softball, and Lacrosse.

- 1995 State AA Football Champions
- 2004, 2005, 2010, 2011, 2012, 2013, 2014, 2015, 2018, 2021, 2022, 2023, 2024 & 2025 District 3 Football Champions
- 2009 State AA Boys Track & Field Champions
- 2010, 2011, 2013, 2021 and 2025 State Runners-up
- 2010 MidPenn Champions Girls Track and Field
- 2011 District 3 AA Girls Track & Field Champions
- 2011 Conference Undefeated Title Girls Track and Field
- 2011 MidPenn Champions Girls Track and Field
- 2012 District 3 AA Girls Soccer Champions
- 2022 State AAAA Football Champions
- 2024 State AAAAA Football Champions

== Notable alumni ==
- Michael Behe, biochemist and Lehigh University professor
- Aaron Berry, former professional football player, Cleveland Browns, Detroit Lions, and New York Jets
- Margaret Carlson, columnist, Bloomberg News
- Larry Conjar, former professional football player, Baltimore Colts, Cleveland Browns, and Philadelphia Eagles
- Don Falcone, progressive rock musician
- Carmen Finestra, producer and TV writer, The Cosby Show
- Bryce Hall, professional football player, New York Jets
- Connor Maloney, professional soccer player, San Antonio FC
- LeRon McCoy, former professional football player, Arizona Cardinals and San Francisco 49ers
- LeSean McCoy, former professional football player, Buffalo Bills, Kansas City Chiefs, Philadelphia Eagles, and Tampa Bay Buccaneers
- Craig “Mo” Morrison, VP Accord Restoration. Alvernia University Hall of Fame Baseball Player
- Audrie J. Neenan, actress
- Andy Panko, former professional basketball player, Atlanta Hawks
- Steven Pasquale, actor, Rescue Me
- Stephen R. Reed, former Harrisburg mayor
- Rico Scott, college football wide receiver for the Alabama Crimson Tide
- Noah Spence, former professional football player, Cincinnati Bengals, New Orleans Saints, Tampa Bay Buccaneers, and Washington Redskins
- Jaimie Thomas, former professional football player, Indianapolis Colts
- Ricky Watters, former professional football player, Philadelphia Eagles, San Francisco 49ers, and Seattle Seahawks
