= Archdiocese of Philadelphia =

Latin Catholic diocese of Philadelphia

Archdiocese of Philadelphia Archidiœcesis Philadelphiensis

Catholic
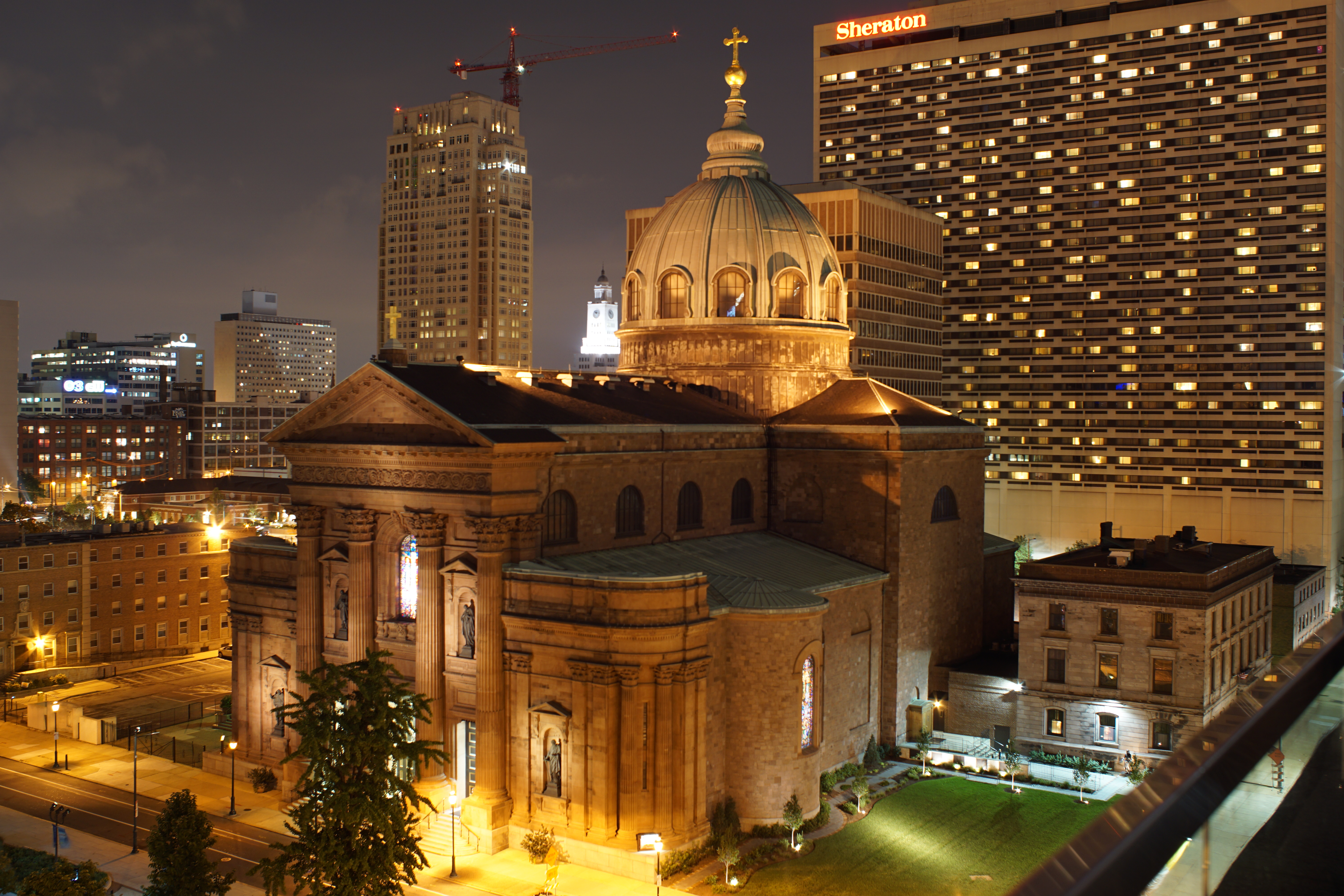
- Cathedral Basilica of Saints Peter and Paul in Philadelphia

- Coat of arms

- Flag

Location
- Country: United States
- Territory: Philadelphia and the counties of Bucks, Chester, Delaware, Montgomery, Philadelphia
- Ecclesiastical province: Metropolitan Province of Philadelphia
- Headquarters: 222 North 17th St, Philadelphia, Pennsylvania, U.S.
- Coordinates: 39°57′26″N 75°10′04″W

Statistics
- Area: 2,183 sq mi (5,650 km^{2})
- Population: Total; Catholics: (as of 2019); 4,119,268; 1,437,400 (34.9%)
- Parishes: 214

Information
- Denomination: Catholic
- Sui iuris church: Latin Church
- Rite: Roman Rite
- Established: April 8, 1808; 218 years ago
- Cathedral: Cathedral-Basilica of Sts. Peter and Paul
- Patron saint: Our Lady of the Immaculate Conception (Primary); Peter and Paul (Titular)
- Secular priests: 274

Current leadership
- Pope: Leo XIV
- Metropolitan Archbishop: Nelson J. Pérez
- Auxiliary Bishops: John J. McIntyre; Keith J. Chylinski; Christopher R. Cooke; Efren V. Esmilla
- Vicar General: Reverend Philip G. Bochanski
- Bishops emeritus: Justin Rigali; Charles Joseph Chaput; Edward Michael Deliman; Michael J. Fitzgerald

Map
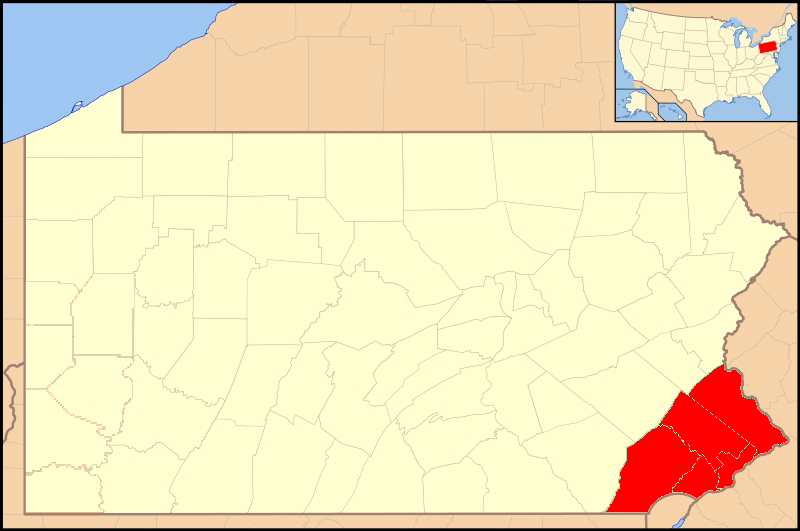
- Location of the Catholic Archdiocese of Philadelphia in Pennsylvania

Website
- archphila.org

The Archdiocese of Philadelphia (Latin: Archidiœcesis Philadelphiensis) is a diocese of the Catholic Church in southeastern Pennsylvania in the United States. The seat of the archbishop is the Cathedral Basilica of Saints Peter and Paul in Philadelphia. Nelson J. Pérez is the archbishop.

== Territory ==
The Archdiocese of Philadelphia covers five Pennsylvania counties: Bucks, Chester, Delaware, Montgomery, and Philadelphia. It is the metropolitan see of the Ecclesiastical Province of Philadelphia.

The archdiocese includes the following suffragan dioceses:

- Allentown
- Altoona-Johnstown
- Erie
- Greensburg
- Harrisburg
- Pittsburgh
- Scranton

== History ==
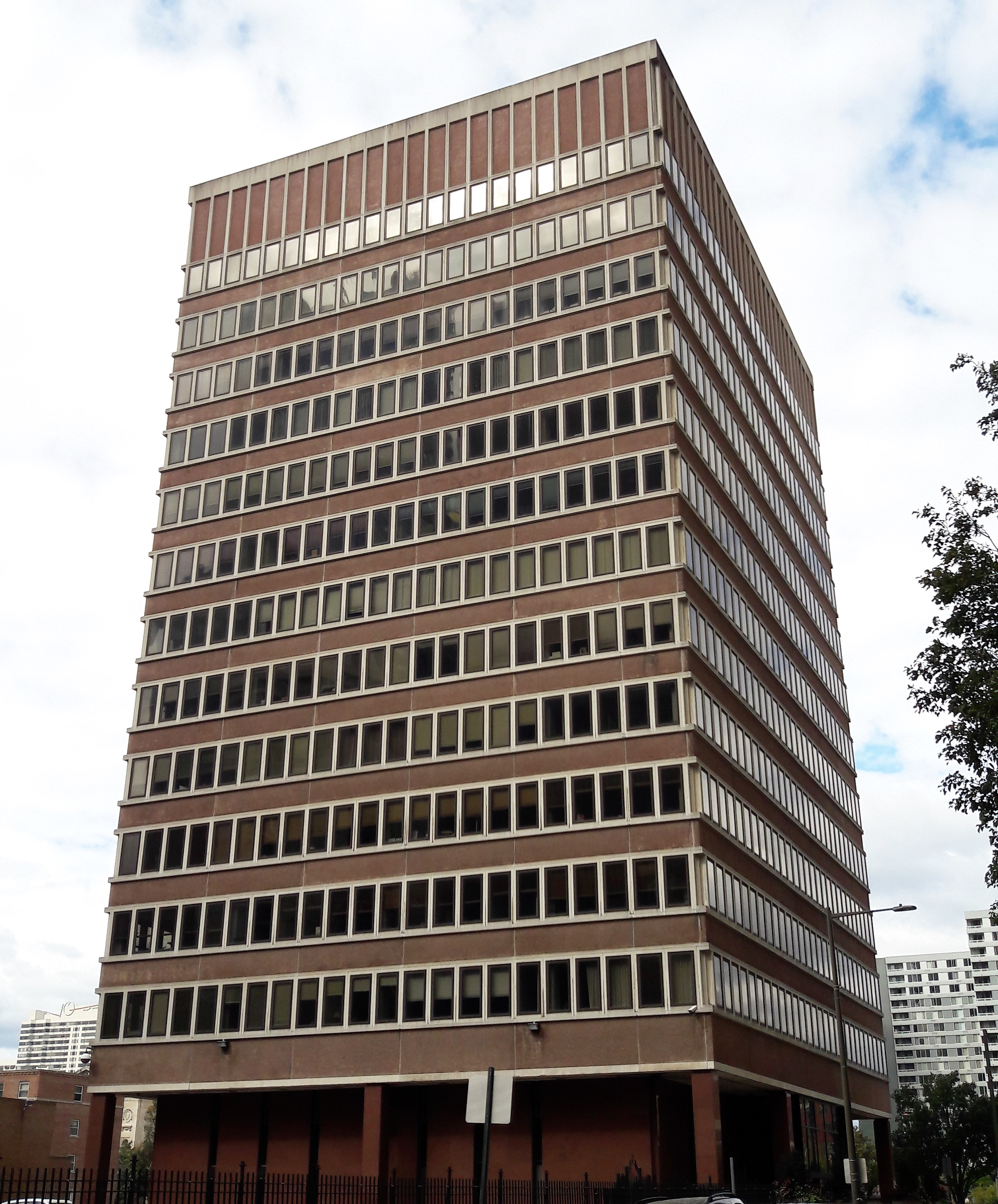
Archdiocesan Pastoral Center

The history of the Catholic Church in the area dates back to William Penn when Mass was said publicly as early as 1707.

=== 19th century ===
In 1808, Pope Pius VII erected the suffragan dioceses of Boston, New York City, Philadelphia, and Bardstown, Kentucky, from the territory of the Diocese of Baltimore. The pope appointed Michael Francis Egan as the first bishop of Philadelphia.

In 1868, the Vatican erected the dioceses of Harrisburg, Scranton, and Wilmington, taking territory from the Diocese of Philadelphia.

The Vatican elevated the Diocese of Philadelphia to Archdiocese on February 12, 1875.

=== 20th century ===
In 1961, Pope John XXIII erected the Diocese of Allentown, taking several northern counties from the Archdiocese of Philadelphia. By 1969, the archdiocese had grown to 1,351,704 parishioners, 1,096 diocesan priests, 676 priests of religious institutes and 6,622 religious women.

=== 21st century ===
Grand jury reports from the District Attorney of Philadelphia in 2003, 2005, and 2011 revealed dozens of archdiocesan priests with credible sexual abuse allegations. In total, 13 priests and one archdiocesan teacher were convicted of some form of sexual abuse crime. The archdiocese created the Independent Reconciliation and Reparations Program (IRRP) in 2018, and an estimated total of $130 million has been spent to compensate for over 400 victims.

In February 2012, the diocese announced the largest reorganization of its elementary and high school education system, with numerous recommended school closings or mergers. In August 2012, the archdiocese announced that the Faith in the Future Foundation would assume management of the 17 archdiocesan high schools and the four special education schools. In 2015, it was reported that Waldron Mercy Academy's director of religious education, Margie Winters, had been fired from the school after a parent had reported her directly to the archdiocese for marrying her lesbian partner in a civil ceremony in 2007.

The archdiocese has had a foster care agency for more than 100 years. It sued Philadelphia after the city stopped referring foster care cases to the agency after it refused to use same-sex couples to foster children. The case went to the US Supreme Court with the name Fulton v. City of Philadelphia, Pa.

== Bishops ==
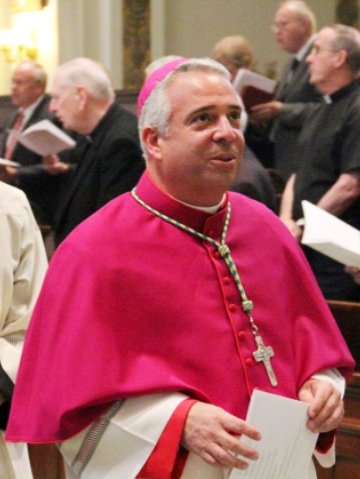
Archbishop Nelson J. Perez

=== Bishops of Philadelphia ===
1. Michael Francis Egan, O.F.M. (1808–1814)
  (Ambrose Maréchal, P.S.S. appointed in 1816; did not take effect.)
2. Henry Conwell (1819–1841)
3. Francis Patrick Kenrick (1842–1851; coadjutor bishop 1830–1842), appointed Archbishop of Baltimore
4. Saint John Nepomucene Neumann (1852–1860)
5. James Frederick Wood (1860–1875; coadjutor bishop 1857–1860), elevated to archbishop

=== Archbishops of Philadelphia ===
1. James Frederick Wood (1875–1883)
2. Patrick John Ryan (1884–1911)
3. Edmond Francis Prendergast (1911–1918)
4. Cardinal Dennis Joseph Dougherty (1918–1951)
5. Cardinal John Francis O'Hara, C.S.C. (1951–1960)
6. Cardinal John Joseph Krol (1961–1988)
7. Cardinal Anthony Joseph Bevilacqua (1988–2003)
8. Cardinal Justin Francis Rigali (2003–2011)
9. Charles Joseph Chaput, O.F.M. Cap. (2011–2020)
10. Nelson J. Perez (2020–present)

=== Current auxiliary bishops ===
- John J. McIntyre (2010–present)
- Keith J. Chylinski (2024–present)
- Christopher R. Cooke (2024–present)
- Efren V. Esmilla (2024–present)

=== Former auxiliary bishops ===
- John Joseph McCort (1912–1920), appointed Coadjutor Bishop and later Bishop of Altoona
- Michael Joseph Crane (1921–1928)
- Gerald Patrick O'Hara (1929–1935), appointed Bishop of Savannah and later Apostolic Nuncio and Titular Archbishop
- Hugh L. Lamb (1935–1951), appointed Bishop of Greensburg
- J. Carroll McCormick (1947–1960), appointed Bishop of Altoona-Johnstown and later Bishop of Scranton
- Joseph Mark McShea (1952–1961), appointed Bishop of Allentown
- Cletus Joseph Benjamin (1960–1961)
- Francis James Furey (1960–1963), appointed Coadjutor Archbishop and later Archbishop of San Antonio
- Gerald Vincent McDevitt (1962–1980)
- John Joseph Graham (1963–1988)
- Thomas Jerome Welsh (1970–1974), appointed Bishop of Arlington and later Bishop of Allentown
- Martin Nicholas Lohmuller (1970–1994)
- Edward Thomas Hughes (1976–1986), appointed Bishop of Metuchen
- Francis B. Schulte (1981–1985), appointed Bishop of Wheeling-Charleston and later Archbishop of New Orleans
- Louis A. DeSimone (1981–1997)
- Edward Peter Cullen (1994–1997), appointed Bishop of Allentown
- Joseph Francis Martino (1996–2003), appointed Bishop of Scranton
- Robert P. Maginnis (1996–2010)
- Michael Francis Burbidge (2002–2006), appointed Bishop of Raleigh and later Bishop of Arlington
- Joseph R. Cistone (2004–2009), appointed Bishop of Saginaw
- Joseph P. McFadden (2004–2010), appointed Bishop of Harrisburg
- Daniel E. Thomas (2006–2014), appointed Bishop of Toledo
- Edward Michael Deliman (2016–2022)
- Timothy C. Senior (2009–2023), appointed Bishop of Harrisburg
- Michael J. Fitzgerald (2010–2023)

=== Other living priests of this diocese who became bishops ===
Note: Year range in parentheses indicates the time of service as a priest of the diocese prior to appointment to the episcopacy.

- Edward Joseph Adams (1970–1996), appointed nuncio and titular archbishop
- Michael Joseph Bransfield (1971–2004), appointed Bishop of Wheeling-Charleston
- Joseph Lawrence Coffey (1996–2019), appointed auxiliary bishop of U.S. Military
- James Patrick Green (1976–2006), appointed nuncio and titular archbishop
- Joseph A. Pepe (1970–2001), appointed Bishop of Las Vegas
- Nelson J. Perez (1989–2012), appointed auxiliary bishop of Rockville Centre; appointed Archbishop of Philadelphia in 2020

=== Other deceased priests of this diocese who became bishops ===
Note: Year range in parentheses indicates the time of service as a priest of the diocese prior to appointment to the episcopacy.

- Herbert Bevard (1972–2008), appointed Bishop of St. Thomas
- Francis Brennan (1920–1940), appointed official of the Roman Rota; appointed titular archbishop and Cardinal in 1967
- Edwin Byrne (1915–1925), appointed Bishop of Ponce
- George Aloysius Carrell, SJ (ordained 1827; Philadelphia native but not priest of this diocese), appointed Bishop of Covington in 1853
- James Jordan Carroll (1889–1908), appointed Bishop of Nueva Segovia, Philippines
- Hubert James Cartwright (1927–1956), appointed Coadjutor Bishop of Wilmington
- Joseph M. Corrigan (1903–1940), appointed titular bishop
- Joseph Thomas Daley (1941–1963), appointed auxiliary bishop of Harrisburg
- Francis Xavier DiLorenzo (1968–1988), appointed auxiliary bishop of Scranton
- Dennis Joseph Dougherty (1890–1903), appointed Bishop of Nueva Segovia, Philippines; appointed Archbishop of Philadelphia in 1918 (Cardinal in 1921)
- Edmond John Fitzmaurice (1904–1925), appointed Bishop of Wilmington
- John Edmund Fitzmaurice (1862–1897), appointed Coadjutor Bishop of Erie
- John Patrick Foley (1962–1984), appointed titular archbishop (Cardinal in 2007)
- Joseph Anthony Galante (1964–1992), appointed auxiliary bishop of San Antonio
- Francis Xavier Gartland (1832–1850), appointed Bishop of Savannah
- Daniel James Gercke (1901–1923), appointed Bishop of Tucson
- Ignatius Frederick Horstmann (1865–1891), appointed Bishop of Cleveland
- John Joseph Hughes (1826–1837), appointed Coadjutor Bishop of New York
- Francis Edward Hyland (1927–1949), appointed auxiliary bishop of Savannah-Atlanta
- Thomas Francis Kennedy (1887–1907), appointed titular bishop
- James Paul McCloskey (1898–1917), appointed Bishop of Zamboanga, Philippines
- Philip R. McDevitt (1885–1916), appointed Bishop of Harrisburg
- Thomas Joseph McDonough (1938–1947), appointed auxiliary bishop of St. Augustine
- Thomas McGovern (1861–1888), appointed Bishop of Harrisburg
- Eugene J. McGuinness (1915–1937), appointed Bishop of Raleigh
- John Joseph O'Connor (1945–1979), appointed auxiliary bishop of U.S. military; future Cardinal
- William O'Hara (1842–1868), appointed Bishop of Scranton
- Jeremiah F. Shanahan (1859–1868), appointed Bishop of Harrisburg
- John W. Shanahan (1869–1899), appointed Bishop of Harrisburg
- David B. Thompson (1950–1961), appointed Coadjutor Bishop of Charleston in 1989

== Education ==
Circa 1912 there were about 68,000 students in Catholic schools within the archdiocesan territory. This increased to 250,000 in 1961, but the figures decreased after that year. Enrollment was down to 68,000 in 2012. There were about 50,000 students in Catholic schools in the city of Philadelphia in 2000, and this figure decreased to 30,000 in 2010. In that span one Catholic high school and 23 Catholic elementary schools closed or merged, and the proliferation of charter schools in that period meant that the number of students combined in that type of school outnumbered that of the remaining Philadelphia Catholic schools.

In 2012 the archdiocese proposed closing or merging 18 schools in Philadelphia and 31 schools outside of Philadelphia; the Philadelphia Inquirer stated this would further weaken Philadelphia's middle class. The proposal would affect 24% and 29% of the senior high and K-8 schools, respectively.

=== Elementary schools ===
The first Catholic school established in the Archdiocese of Philadelphia was at St. Mary Parish in Philadelphia during the late eighteenth century. During the nineteenth century, Bishop Kenrick encouraged the establishment of Catholic schools. Subsequently, John Neumann (1851–1860) made the establishment of parish elementary schools a priority and by 1860 there were seventeen parish elementary schools in Philadelphia. Between 1900 and 1930, Catholic elementary schools increased to 124 schools in Philadelphia and 78 schools in the four suburban counties. Between 1945 and 1965, 62 new Catholic elementary schools were established.

In 2012, about 25% of the students in Philadelphia Catholic elementary schools were not Catholic. In 2010 South Philadelphia Catholic elementary schools had 2,572 students, a decline by 27% from the 2006 figure.

=== Special needs schools ===
These three schools for special needs children are supported by the Catholic Charities Appeal.

- Saint Katherine School (1953) in Wynnewood and Radnor serves children with intellectual disabilities
- Our Lady of Confidence School (1954) in Willow Grove and Warminster serves children with unique learning styles
- Saint Lucy School (1955) in Philadelphia for children with visual impairment

=== High schools within the archdiocese ===
==== Diocesan high schools ====
The first free diocesan high school in the United States was the Roman Catholic High School of Philadelphia, founded for the education of boys in 1890. The Catholic Girls High School, the first diocesan high school for girls, was founded in 1912. The school became the JW Hallahan Catholic Girls High School and closed in 2020.

West Catholic Boys and Girls High School opened in 1916. Northeast Catholic School for Boys opened in 1926 and closed in 2010, Despite the economic hardships of the 1930s and 1940s, seven more diocesan high schools were founded. Between 1945 and 1967, fifteen high schools were opened.

As of 2023, the Archdiocese of Philadelphia has 15 diocesan high schools.

=== Seminaries ===
- St. Charles Borromeo Seminary
- Redemptois Mater Archdiocesan Missionary Seminary

=== Colleges and universities within the archdiocese ===
Note: Each Catholic college and university within the archdiocese is affiliated with a religious institute, rather than the Archdiocese of Philadelphia.

- Alvernia University (Philadelphia branch campus) – Cheltenham Township (Bernardine Sisters of St. Francis)
- Chestnut Hill College – Philadelphia (Sisters of Saint Joseph)
- Gwynedd Mercy University – Lower Gwynedd Township (Sisters of Mercy)
- Holy Family University – Philadelphia (Sisters of the Holy Family of Nazareth)
- Immaculata University – East Whiteland Township (Sisters, Servants of the Immaculate Heart of Mary)
- La Salle University – Philadelphia (Christian Brothers)
- Neumann University – Aston Township (Sisters of St. Francis of Philadelphia)
- Rosemont College – Lower Merion Township (Society of the Holy Child Jesus)
- Saint Joseph's University – Philadelphia (Jesuits)
- Villanova University – Radnor Township (Augustinians)

== Saints of Philadelphia ==
- Frances Xavier Cabrini, for whom the suburban college is named and who visited on numerous occasions. She started an orphanage and an Italian national parish that still is functioning today, St. Donato's in West Philadelphia.
- Katharine Drexel
- John Nepomucene Neumann – A Redemptorist; became the fourth Bishop of Philadelphia (1852–60) and the first U.S. bishop to be canonized; as bishop of Philadelphia, he founded the first Catholic diocesan school system in the U.S.

== Shrines of Philadelphia ==
- Basilica Shrine of Our Lady of the Miraculous Medal
- National Shrine of Our Lady of Czestochowa
- National Shrine of Saint John Neumann
- Saint Katharine Drexel Mission Center and Shrine
- National Shrine of Saint Rita of Cascia

== Publications ==
- The Catholic Standard & Times (former newspaper)
- CatholicPhilly.com (online news site)

== See also ==
- Catholic Church and politics in the United States
- Catholic Church in the United States
- Connelly Foundation
- Ecclesiastical Province of Philadelphia
- Global organisation of the Catholic Church
- History of Catholicism in the United States
- List of Catholic archdioceses
- List of Catholic dioceses in the United States
- Philadelphia Nativist Riots
- Plenary Councils of Baltimore
- Polish Cathedral style
- LT Robert R. Brett, S.M., Chaplain, USN – Chaplain killed during Vietnam War.
- Ukrainian Catholic Archeparchy of Philadelphia, other Catholic archdiocese-level province based in Philadelphia
