= Patrick John Ryan =

Irish-born prelate (1831–1911)

The Most Reverend Patrick John Ryan
- Archbishop of Philadelphia
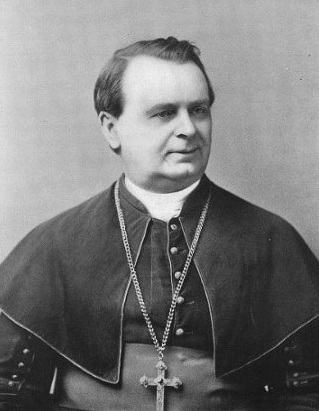
- Church: Roman Catholic
- Archdiocese: Philadelphia
- Appointed: 8 July 1884
- In office: 1884–1911
- Predecessor: James Frederick Wood
- Successor: Edmond Francis Prendergast
- Previous post: Coadjutor Archbishop of St Louis (1872–1884)

Orders
- Ordination: 8 September 1852 by Peter Richard Kenrick
- Consecration: 14 April 1872 by Peter Richard Kenrick
- Rank: Metropolitan Archbishop

Personal details
- Born: February 20, 1831 Thurles, Ireland
- Died: February 11, 1911 (aged 79)
- Occupation: Catholic bishop
- Education: Carlow College

Patrick John Ryan (February 20, 1831 – February 11, 1911) was an Irish-born Catholic prelate who served as Archbishop of Philadelphia from 1884 until his death in 1911.

== Early life and education ==
Patrick Ryan was born in Thurles, County Tipperary, to Jeremiah and Mary Tuohy Ryan. His father died when Patrick was nine years old.

He received his early education from the Christian Brothers at Thurles, and attended a private school in Dublin from 1842 to 1847. In 1844, he led a delegation of students to Richmond Bridewell Prison, where he delivered an address to the imprisoned Daniel O'Connell. He completed his theological studies at Carlow College in 1852, his education supported by The Foreign Mission Fund, and was ordained a subdeacon.

In the same year he left Ireland for the United States, in the company of Patrick Feehan, later Archbishop of Chicago. Ryan became attached to the Archdiocese of St. Louis in Missouri. He then served as a professor of English literature at the seminary in Carondelet for a year.

== Priesthood ==
Ryan was ordained to the priesthood by Archbishop Peter Richard Kenrick on September 8, 1853. At age 21, he was below the age requirement for ordination but was granted a dispensation by Pope Pius IX. He was then appointed an assistant rector at the Cathedral of St. Louis, and was advanced to rector in 1856. In 1860, he was named pastor of the Church of the Annunciation in St. Louis, where he built a church and parochial school. During the Civil War, he served as a chaplain for prisoners of war at the Gratiot Street Prison. In the same parish was a government military hospital. Every day Ryan visited the Confederate prisoners and the Union wounded.

Following the war, he was transferred to St. John's Church in St. Louis, and accompanied Archbishop Kenrick, as theologian, to the Second Plenary Council of Baltimore in 1866. While on a visit to Europe in 1868, he delivered the English course of Lenten lectures in Rome at the invitation of Pius IX. Upon his return to St. Louis later that year, he was made vicar general of the Archdiocese. He administered the Archdiocese while Archbishop Kenrick attended the First Vatican Council.

== Episcopacy ==
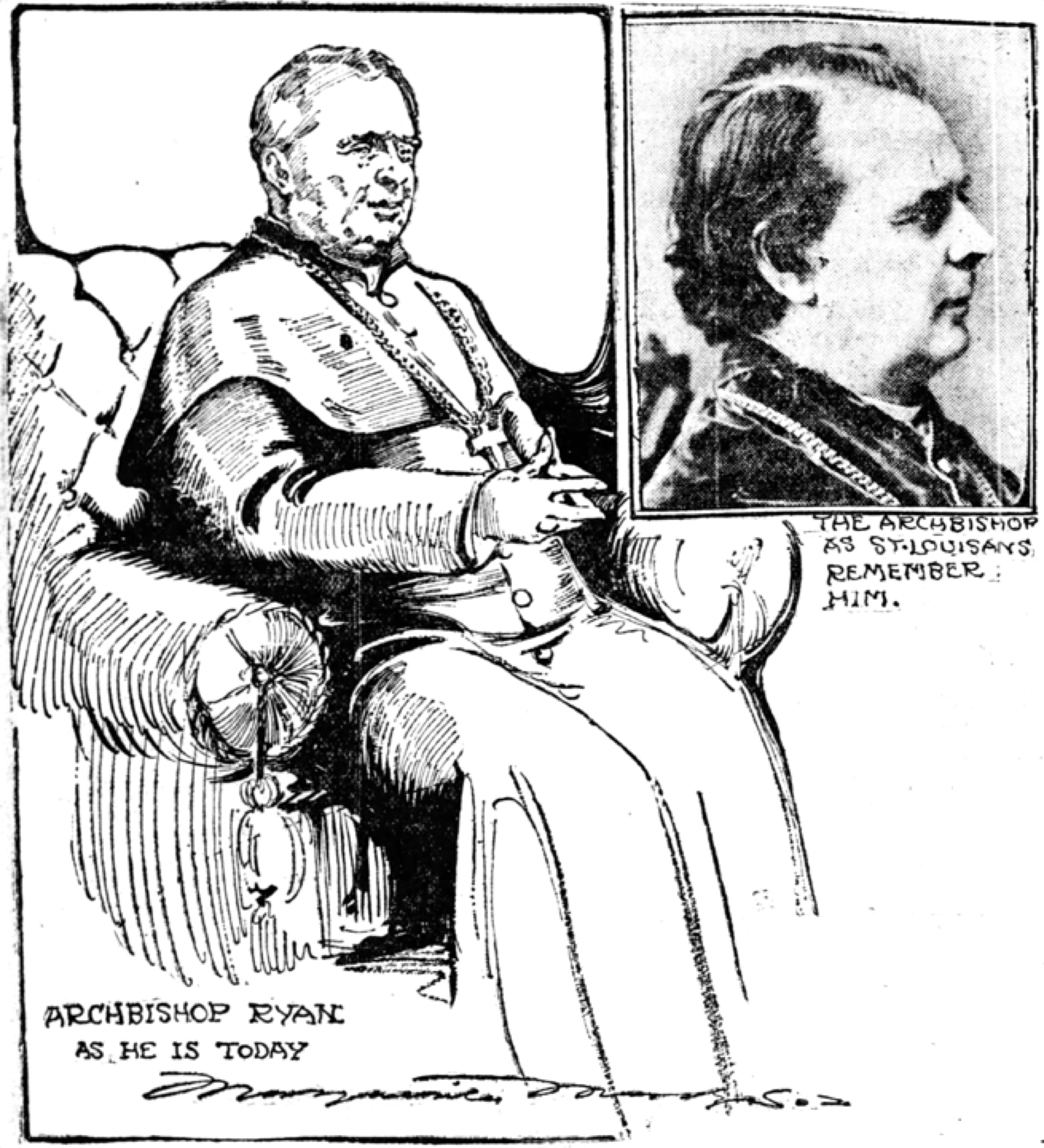
Ryan in a photo and as sketched by journalist Marguerite Martyn for the St. Louis Post-Dispatch, published December 19, 1909

On February 15, 1872, Ryan was appointed Coadjutor Archbishop of St. Louis and Titular Archbishop of Tricomia by Pius IX. He received his episcopal consecration on the following April 14 from Archbishop Kenrick, with Archbishop Patrick Feehan and Bishop Joseph Melcher serving as co-consecrators. His titular see was changed to Salamis on January 6, 1884. After the death of Archbishop James Frederick Wood, Ryan was named the second Archbishop of Philadelphia, Pennsylvania, on June 8, 1884. His installation took place at the Cathedral of SS. Peter and Paul on the following August 20.

During his 27-year-long tenure, Ryan erected 170 churches and 82 schools; increased the number of priests by 322 and nuns by 1,545; and oversaw a rise in the Catholic population from 300,000 to 525,000. During that time also the Roman Catholic High School for Boys was built, and put in operation; high school centers for girls taught by the different communities were established; a new central high school for girls was partly endowed and begun; St. Francis' Industrial School for Boys was endowed and successfully operated, the Philadelphia Protectory for Boys was erected; St. Joseph's Home for Working Boys was founded; a new foundling asylum and maternity hospital was built; a new St. Vincent's Home for younger orphan children was purchased with the archbishop's Golden Jubilee Fund of $200,000; a third Home for the Aged was erected; a Memorial Library Building, dedicated to the Archbishop, was begun at St. Charles Borromeo Seminary; and the three Catholic hospitals of the city doubled their capacity. In 1886, as chairman of the negotiating committee, he helped mediate a labor dispute between management and city trolley car workers, which resulted in a 10-hour work day and recognition of the right to unionize.

He also established national churches in the diocese for the Italians, Poles, Greeks, Slovaks, Lithuanians, and several other nationalities. Ryan was a spiritual advisor to Katharine Drexel. He founded two congregations for African Americans, and the Spiritans founded an establishment in Cornwells Heights.

Known for his skill in public speaking, in 1879, Cardinal John McCloskey selected Ryan to make the address at the dedication of St. Patrick's Cathedral. Ryan would later preach the sermon at McCloskey's funeral in 1885. James Gibbons chose Ryan to speak on the occasion Gibbons was made cardinal. New York University awarded Ryan an honorary Doctor of Laws degree, as did the University of Pennsylvania. He was appointed to the U.S. Indian Commission by President Theodore Roosevelt. In 1888, he again visited Rome, and presented Pope Leo XIII with a gift from President Grover Cleveland.

Ryan died at age 79. The Archbishop is described as "..a man of strong opinions who navigates the stormy waters of the nineteenth and early twentieth-century church without either making many enemies or compromising his basic beliefs."

Catholic Church titles
Preceded by James Frederick Bryan Wood	Archbishop of Philadelphia; 1884–1911	Succeeded by Edmond Francis Prendergast
Preceded by –	Coadjutor Archbishop of St. Louis; 1872–1884	Succeeded by –
