= Edmond Francis Prendergast =

American Catholic bishop (1843-1918)

The Most Reverend Edmond Francis Prendergast
- Archbishop of Philadelphia
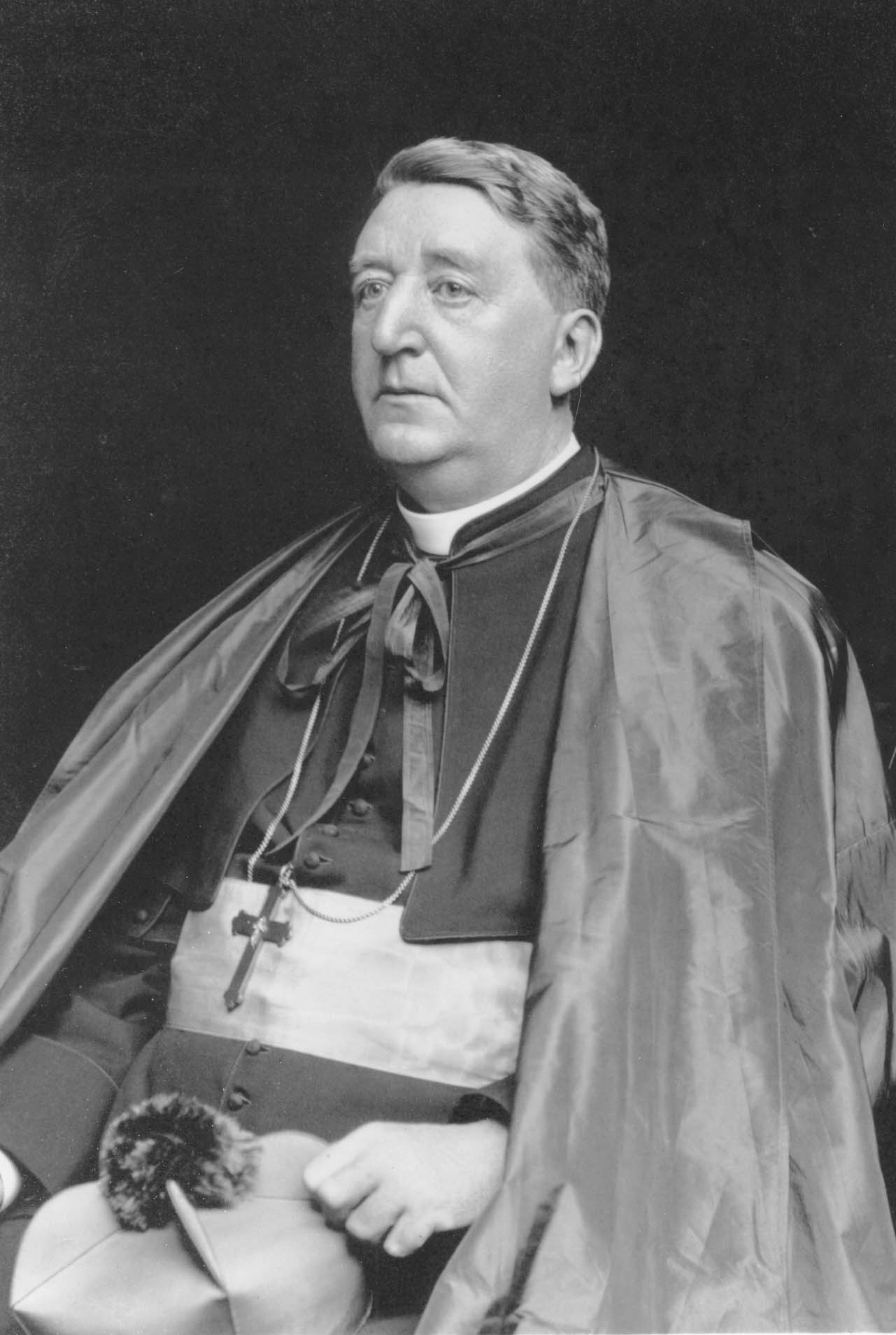
- Church: Catholic Church
- Archdiocese: Philadelphia
- Appointed: May 29, 1911
- Term ended: February 26, 1918
- Predecessor: Patrick John Ryan
- Successor: Dennis Joseph Dougherty
- Previous post: Auxiliary Bishop of Philadelphia (1897–1911)

Orders
- Ordination: November 17, 1865 by James Frederick Wood
- Consecration: February 24, 1897 by Patrick John Ryan

Personal details
- Born: May 3, 1843 Clonmel, County Tipperary, Ireland
- Died: February 26, 1918 (aged 74) Philadelphia, Pennsylvania, U.S.
- Motto: Ut sim fidelis (Latin for 'May I be faithful')

Edmond Francis Prendergast (May 3, 1843 – February 26, 1918) was an American Catholic prelate who served as Archbishop of Philadelphia from 1911 until his death in 1918.

== Early life and education ==
A native of Ireland, Edmond Francis Prendergast was born on May 3, 1843, in Clonmel, County Tipperary. He was the son of Laurence and Johanna (née Carew) Prendergast.

Several members of Prendergast's family entered the priesthood or religious orders. Two brothers became priests and two sisters became nuns; one brother, Father Peter J. Prendergast, served as pastor of the Church of the Epiphany in New York City. At the suggestion of one of his uncles, Father Francis Carew, who served as pastor of St. Rose of Lima Church in Carbondale, Pennsylvania, Prendergast came to the United States in 1859 to study for the priesthood.

Prendergast first studied at the preparatory seminary at Glen Riddle in Delaware County, near Philadelphia. He then entered St. Charles Borromeo Seminary, then located at 18th and Race Streets in Philadelphia, where he completed his philosophical and theological studies.

== Priesthood ==
On November 17, 1865, Prendergast was ordained a priest by Bishop James Frederick Wood. He then served as an assistant pastor at St. Paul Church in South Philadelphia for six months. Due to poor health, he asked to be transferred to a country parish and was appointed to St. Joseph Church at Susquehanna Depot.

Prendergast served as pastor of St. Mark Church in Bristol (1868–1870) and Immaculate Conception Church in Allentown (1870–1874) before returning to Philadelphia as pastor of St. Malachy Church. He held that position for 37 years, until becoming archbishop, in addition to several other responsibilities. In 1879, he was appointed vicar general of the Archdiocese of Philadelphia.

== Episcopal career ==
=== Auxiliary Bishop of Philadelphia ===
On December 5, 1896, Prendergast was appointed auxiliary bishop of Philadelphia and titular bishop of Scillium by Pope Leo XIII. He received his episcopal consecration on February 24, 1897, from Archbishop Patrick John Ryan, with Bishops Ignatius Frederick Horstmann and Michael John Hoban serving as co-consecrators.

As an auxiliary bishop, Prendergast continued to serve as pastor of St. Malachy Church and vicar general of the archdiocese.

=== Archbishop of Philadelphia ===
Following the death of Archbishop Ryan in February 1911, Prendergast was appointed the third Archbishop of Philadelphia by Pope Pius X on May 29 of that year. He was installed at the Cathedral of Saints Peter and Paul on the following July 26, and received the pallium on January 31, 1912.

At the beginning of his tenure, the Archdiocese of Philadelphia had 582 priests, 297 churches, and 141 parochial schools to serve a Catholic population of 525,000. By the end of his tenure, the archdiocese had 779 priests, 284 churches, 180 parochial schools, and 710,000 Catholics. He also opened Catholic Girls High School in 1911 and West Philadelphia Catholic High School for Boys in 1916, as well as Misericordia Hospital in Philadelphia and Sacred Heart Hospital in Allentown. Furthermore, he opened St. Edmond's Hall at St. Charles Borromeo Seminary in 1914, and renovated the cathedral in 1915.

In 1912, at the age of 68, Prendergast consecrated Father John Joseph McCort, his vicar general, as an auxiliary bishop for Philadelphia.

== Death and legacy ==
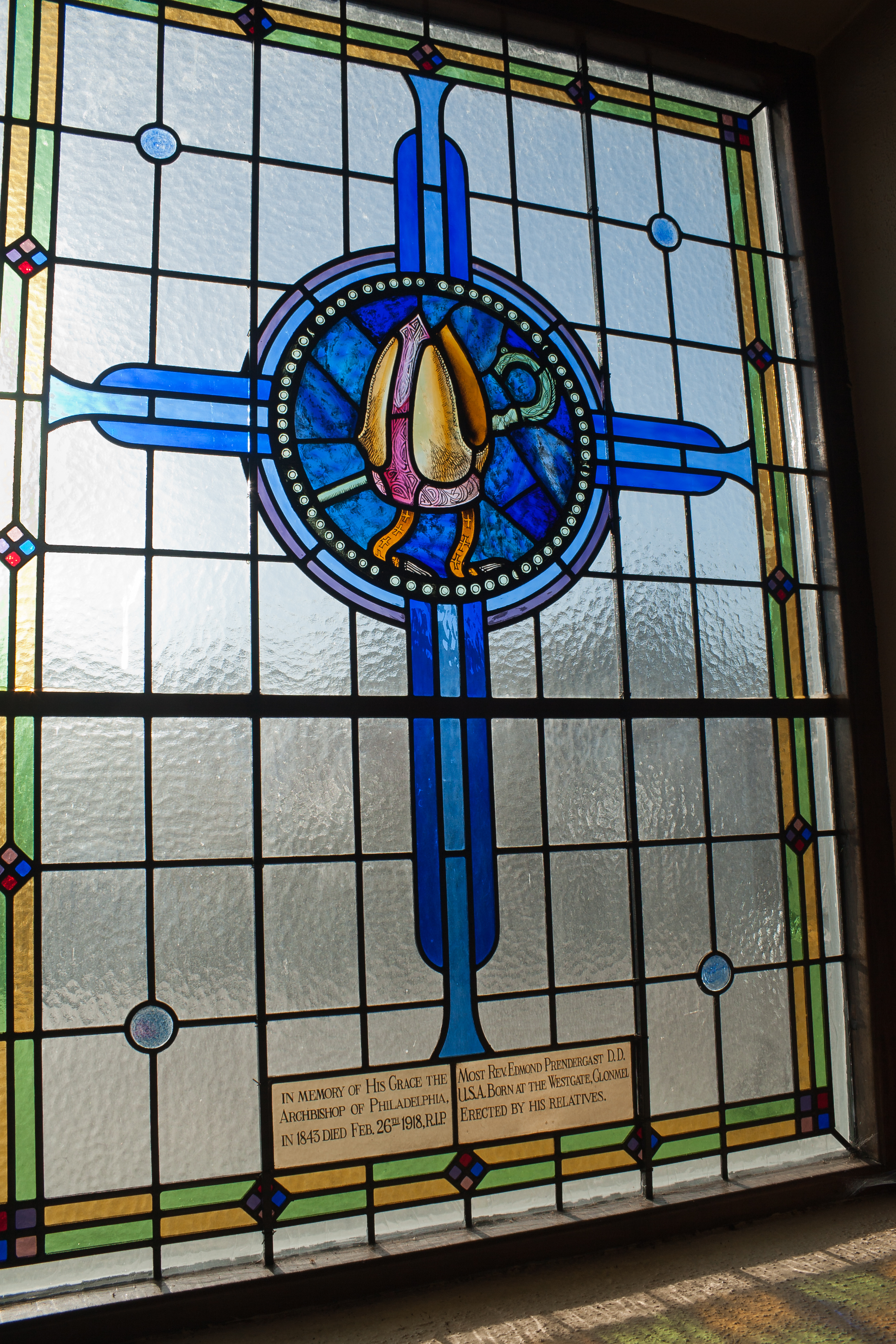
Memorial window dedicated to Prendergast in St. Mary's Church in Clonmel

Prendergast died at the episcopal residence on February 26, 1918.

In 2005, Archbishop Prendergast High School for Young Women in Drexel Hill, Pennsylvania, merged with Monsignor Bonner High School for Young Men to create Bonner & Prendergast Catholic High School.

Catholic Church titles
Preceded by Patrick John Ryan	Archbishop of Philadelphia; 1911–1918	Succeeded by Dennis Joseph Dougherty
