= Thomas McGovern (bishop) =

American prelate

His Excellency, The Right Reverend Thomas Francis McGovern D.D.
- Bishop of Harrisburg
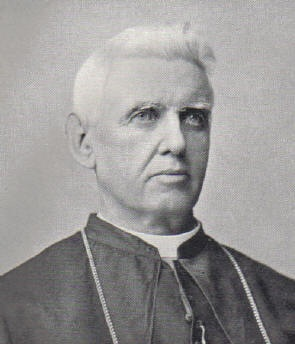
- Diocese: Diocese of Harrisburg
- Appointed: December 6, 1887
- Predecessor: Jeremiah F. Shanahan
- Successor: John W. Shanahan

Orders
- Ordination: December 27, 1861 by James Frederick Bryan Wood
- Consecration: March 11, 1888 by William O'Hara

Personal details
- Born: April 10, 1832 Swanlinbar, County Cavan, Ireland
- Died: July 25, 1898 (aged 66)
- Buried: Mount Calvary Cemetery, Harrisburg, Pennsylvania
- Education: Mount St. Mary’s Seminary; St. Charles Borromeo Seminary; Saint Joseph College
- Motto: Forti salus in fide ('A strong faith in your salvation')

Thomas McGovern (April 10, 1832—July 25, 1898) was an American prelate of the Roman Catholic Church who served as the second bishop of the Diocese of Harrisburg in Pennsylvania, from 1888 until his death in 1898.

== Biography ==
=== Early life ===
McGovern was born on April 10, 1832, in the townland of Drumbar (Kinawley), Swanlinbar, County Cavan in Ireland. His family immigrated to the United States in 1833, settling in Albany Township, Pennsylvania.

In 1855, McGovern entered Mount St. Mary's College in Emmitsburg, Maryland, where he earned a Bachelor of Arts degree. He completed his theological studies at St. Charles Borromeo Seminary in Philadelphia.

=== Priesthood ===
McGovern was ordained a priest for the Diocese of Philadelphia by Bishop James Wood on December 27, 1861. After serving parishes at Pottstown and Douglassville, Pennsylvania, McGovern was named a curate at St. Michael's Parish and later St. Philip's Parish in Philadelphia. He served as pastor of a parish in Bellefonte, Pennsylvania, from 1864 until 1870, when he was transferred to St. Patrick's Parish in York, Pennsylvania. In 1873, McGovern was appointed to a parish in Danville, Pennsylvania. From 1881 to 1882, he went to Europe, Africa and Asia to regain his health.

=== Bishop of Harrisburg ===
On December 6, 1887, McGovern was appointed bishop of Harrisburg by Pope Leo XIII. He received his episcopal consecration on March 11, 1888, from Bishop William O'Hara, with Bishops Richard Gilmour and John Watterson serving as co-consecrators. During his tenure, he erected twelve parishes, mostly designated for the various ethnic groups.

Thomas McGovern died on July 25, 1898, at age 66.

Catholic Church titles
Preceded by Jeremiah F. Shanahan	Bishop of Harrisburg; 1887–1898	Succeeded by John W. Shanahan
