= Roman Catholic Diocese of Harrisburg =

Latin Catholic jurisdiction in the US

Coordinates: 40.28116°N 76.80130°W

Diocese of Harrisburg Diœcesis Harrisburgensis
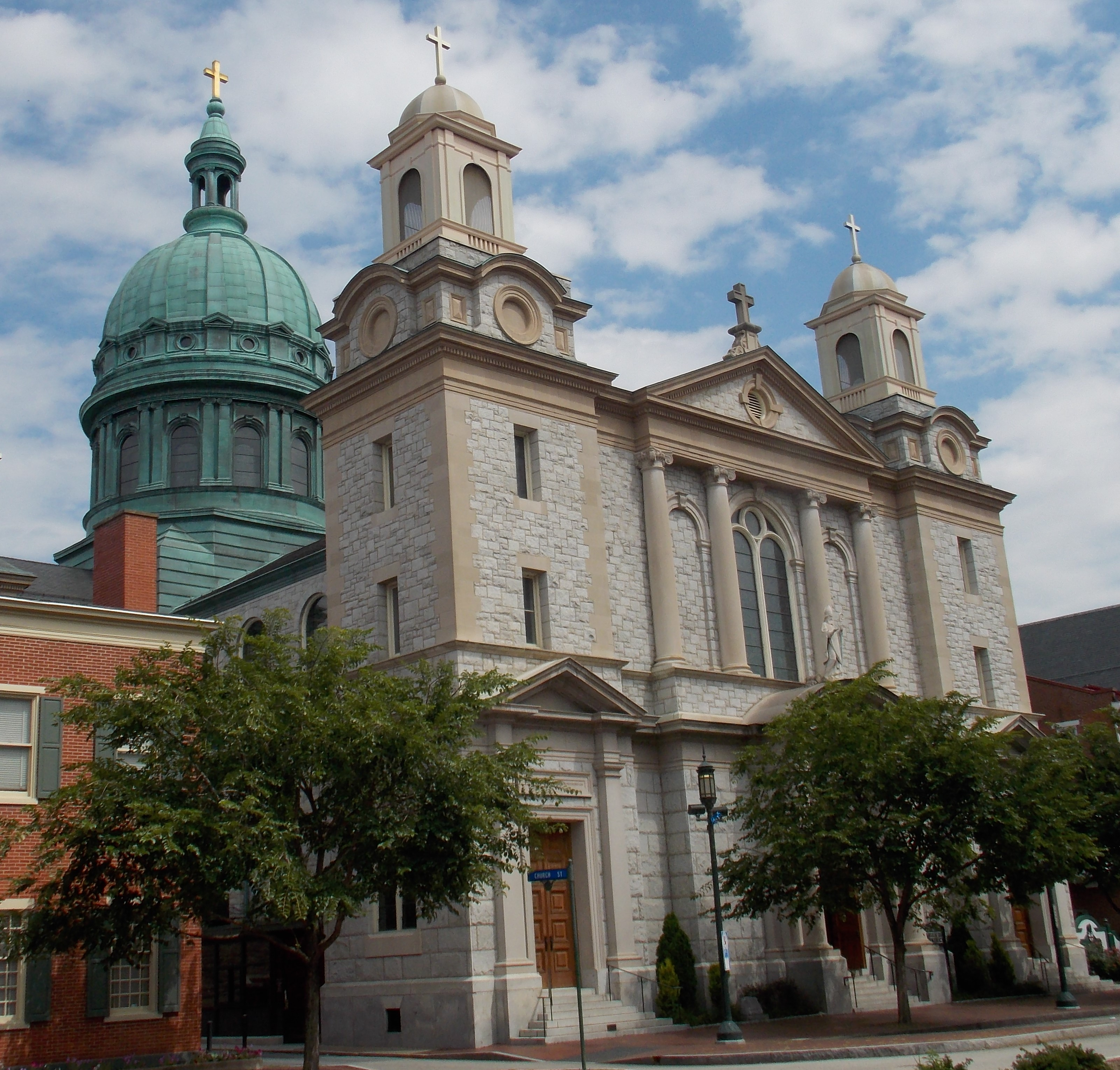
- Cathedral of St. Patrick

- Coat of Arms of the Diocese of Harrisburg

Location
- Country: United States
- Territory: Counties of Adams, Columbia, Cumberland, Dauphin, Franklin, Juniata, Lancaster, Lebanon, Mifflin, Montour, Northumberland, Perry, Snyder, Union and York, Pennsylvania
- Ecclesiastical province: Archdiocese of Philadelphia

Statistics
- Area: 7,660 sq mi (19,800 km^{2})
- Population: Total; Catholics: (as of 2020); 2,294,400; 247,660 (10.8%)
- Parishes: 89

Information
- Denomination: Catholic
- Sui iuris church: Latin Church
- Rite: Roman Rite
- Established: March 3, 1868
- Cathedral: St. Patrick's Cathedral
- Patron saint: Saint Patrick
- Secular priests: 150

Current leadership
- Pope: Leo XIV
- Bishop: Timothy C. Senior
- Metropolitan Archbishop: Nelson J. Perez
- Bishops emeritus: Ronald William Gainer

Map
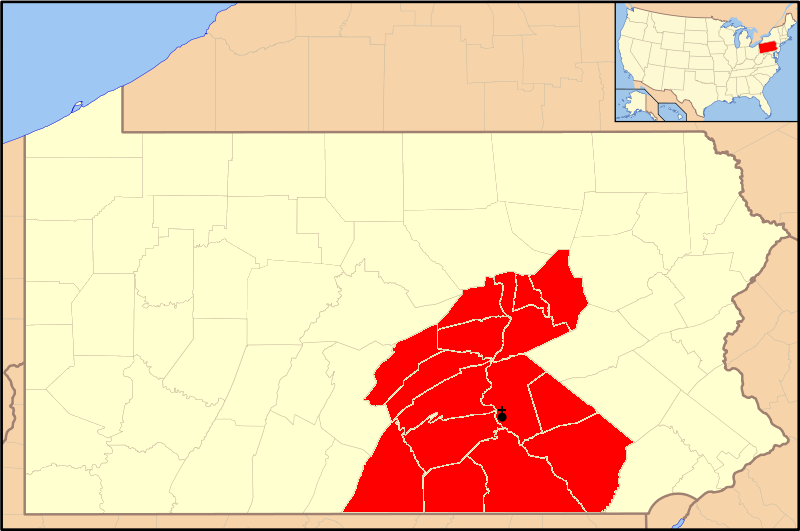

Website
- hbgdiocese.org

The Diocese of Harrisburg (Latin: Diœcesis Harrisburgensis) is a diocese of the Catholic Church in south central Pennsylvania in the United States. It is a suffragan diocese of the metropolitan Archdiocese of Philadelphia. The mother church is St. Patrick's Cathedral in Harrisburg. The bishop is Timothy C. Senior.

== History ==
=== 1700 to 1800 ===
Unlike the other British colonies in America, the Province of Pennsylvania did not ban Catholics from the colony or threaten priests with imprisonment. However, the colony did require any Catholics seeing public office to take an oath to Protestantism. Sacred Heart of Jesus Parish, the oldest parish in the present-day diocese, was founded in Conewago in 1730. In 1743, St. Mary's Parish was established in Lancaster.

In 1784, a year after the end of the American Revolution, Pope Pius VI erected the Apostolic Prefecture of United States of America, including all of the new United States. In 1787, the first Catholic church was erected for German Catholics in Conewago. In 1789, Pius VI converted the prefecture to the Diocese of Baltimore, covering all of the United States. With the passage of the US Bill of Rights in 1791, Catholics received full freedom of worship.

=== 1800 to 1868 ===
The first Catholic mission was founded in Harrisburg in 1806. In 1808, Pope Pius VII erected the Diocese of Philadelphia, covering all of Pennsylvania. South central Pennsylvania would remain part of this new diocese for the next 60 years.

In Harrisburg, the first Catholic Church, St. Patricks, was established for an Irish congregation in 1826. St. Mary's parish was founded in York by the missionary John Neumann in 1852 for a congregation of German-speaking Catholics.

During the 1863 Battle of Gettysburg in the American Civil War, religious sisters converted St. Francis Xavier Church in Gettysburg into a field hospital for casualties, with many nuns from nearby Emmitsburg, Maryland, serving as nurses.

=== 1868 to 1900 ===
On March 3, 1868, Pope Pius IX erected the Diocese of Harrisburg, taking its territory from the Diocese of Philadelphia. He appointed Jeremiah F. Shanahan of Philadelphia as the first bishop of the new diocese.

At the time of its founding, the Diocese of Harrisburg had a Catholic population of 25,000 Catholics, with 22 priests, 40 churches and missions, and seven parochial schools. Shanahan opened the Sylvan Heights Seminary at Harrisburg in 1883. He also introduced the Sisters of Mercy, the Sisters of St. Joseph, the Sisters of Christian Charity, the Sisters of the Holy Cross, and the Sisters of Charity into the diocese to set up Catholic institutions.

When Shanahan died in 1886 after 18 years as bishop, the diocese had 51 priests, 51 churches, 75 chapels and missions, three orphanages, 29 parochial schools, and a Catholic population over 35,000.

The second bishop of Harrisburg was Thomas McGovern of Philadelphia, named by Pope Leo XIII in 1888. During his tenure, McGovern saw twelve new parishes founded. McGovern died in 1898.

=== 1900 to 1937 ===
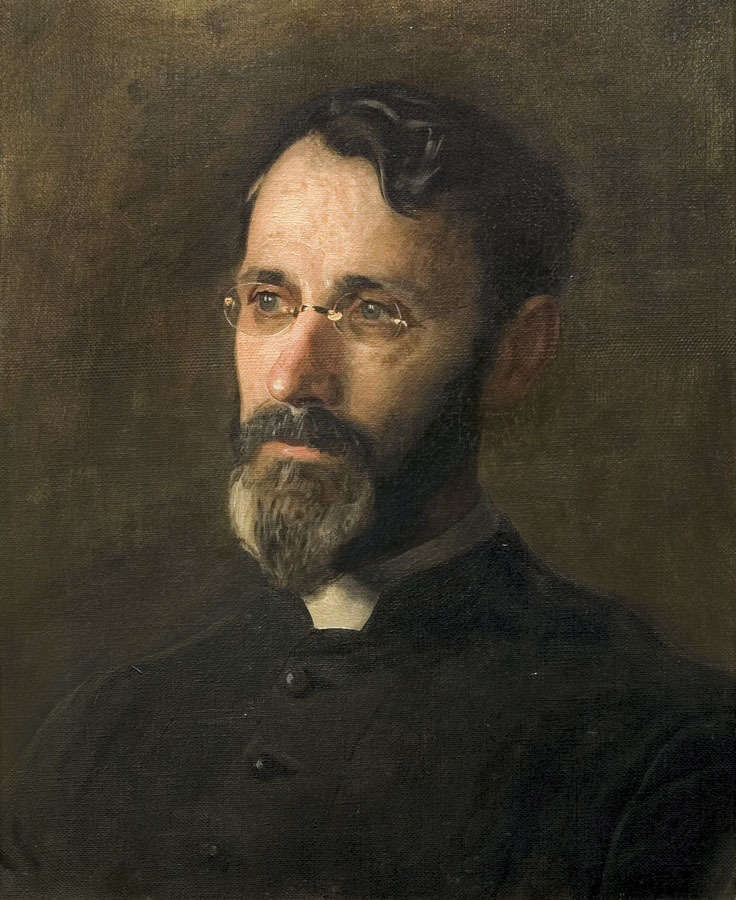
Bishop McDevitt (1901)

John W. Shanahan of Philadelphia, the brother of Jeremiah Shanahan, was became the next bishop of Harrisburg in 1899. During his 16-year tenure, Shanahan oversaw 27 new parishes and an increase in priests from 74 to 120. An orphanage for girls at Sylvan Heights and a protectory for boys at Abbottstown were founded. Shanahan saw the completion of construction on the Cathedral of St. Patrick in 1907. In 1907, he founded the Sisters of Saint Casimir. He also established the motherhouses of the Sisters of the Most Precious Blood and the Sisters of Saints Cyril and Methodius, and invited to the diocese the Franciscan Sisters of Saint Joseph and the Immaculate Heart Sisters of Scranton. John Shanahan died in 1916.

In 1916, Philip R. McDevitt of Philadelphia was appointed the fourth bishop of Harrisburg by Pope Benedict XV. During his 19-year tenure, McDevitt established ten parishes and twelve schools. In 1925, he created the Mission Board to respond to financial needs in the diocese caused by the Great Depression.

=== 1937 to 1990 ===
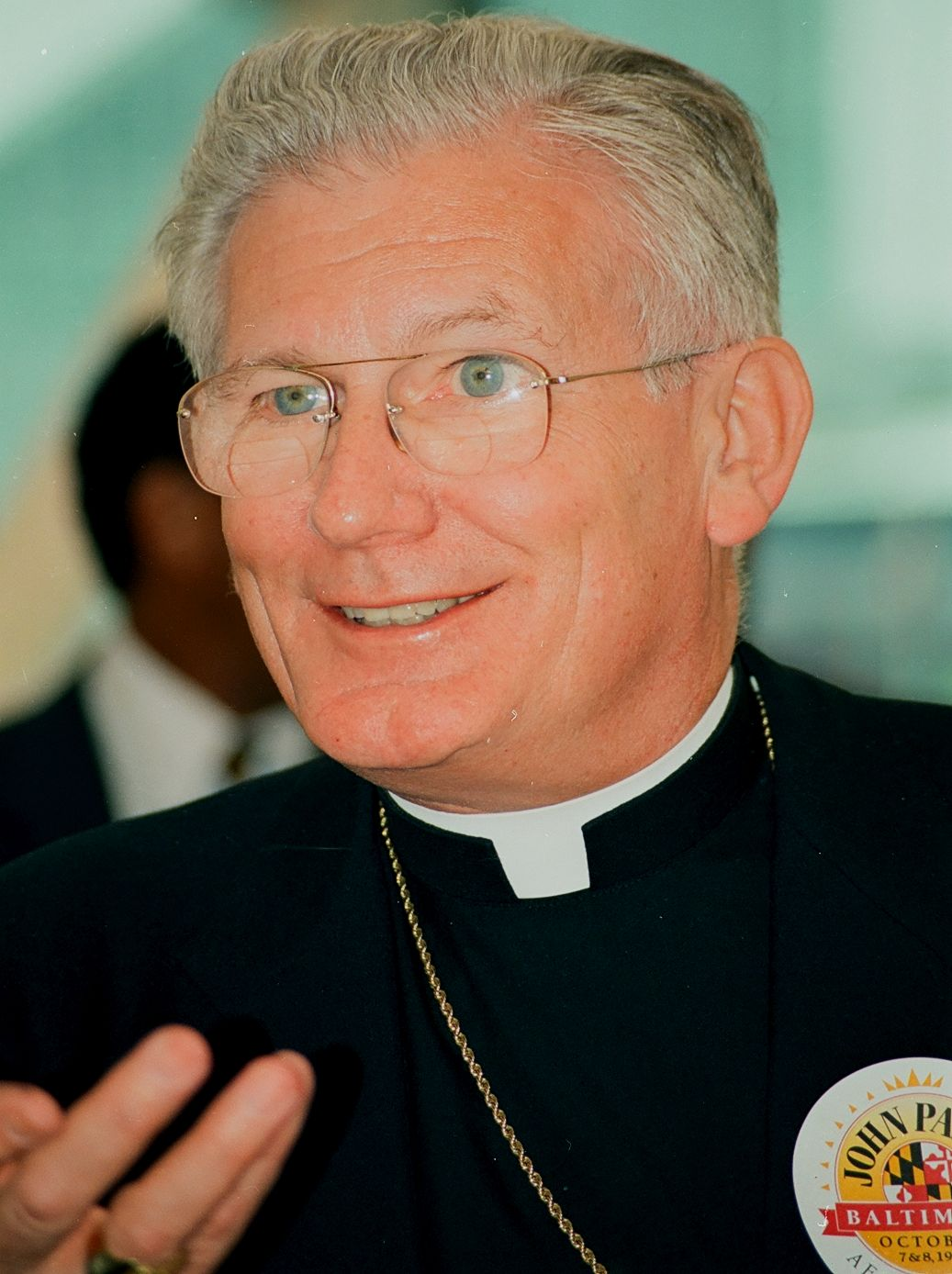
Cardinal Keeler (1996)

After McDevitt died in 1937, Pope Pius XI named Auxiliary Bishop George L. Leech of Harrisburg as the next bishop of Harrisburg. In 1946, Leech described Howard Hughes' 1943 film The Outlaw, which featured actress Jane Russell in provocative outfits, as "a destructive and corrupting picture which glamorizes crime and immorality".

Pope Paul VI appointed Auxiliary Bishop Joseph Thomas Daley of Harrisburg as coadjutor bishop in 1967 to assist Leech. After 34 years as bishop, Leech retired in 1971; Daley automatically succeeded him as the next bishop of Harrisburg.

During his 12-year-long tenure, Daley established the Diocesan Office of Planning, Diocesan Development Office and the Emmaus Program for priests. He called for a temporary moratorium on building nuclear power plants after the accidental release of radiation at the Three Mile Island Nuclear Plant near Harrisburg in 1979. Daley died in 1983.

Auxiliary Bishop William H. Keeler of Harrisburg was the next bishop of Harrisburg, appointed by Pope John Paul II in 1983. As bishop, Keeler served on several committees for interreligious dialogue, and helped expand diocesan youth ministry. Six years later, the pope named him as archbishop of the Archdiocese of Baltimore.

=== 1990 to present ===
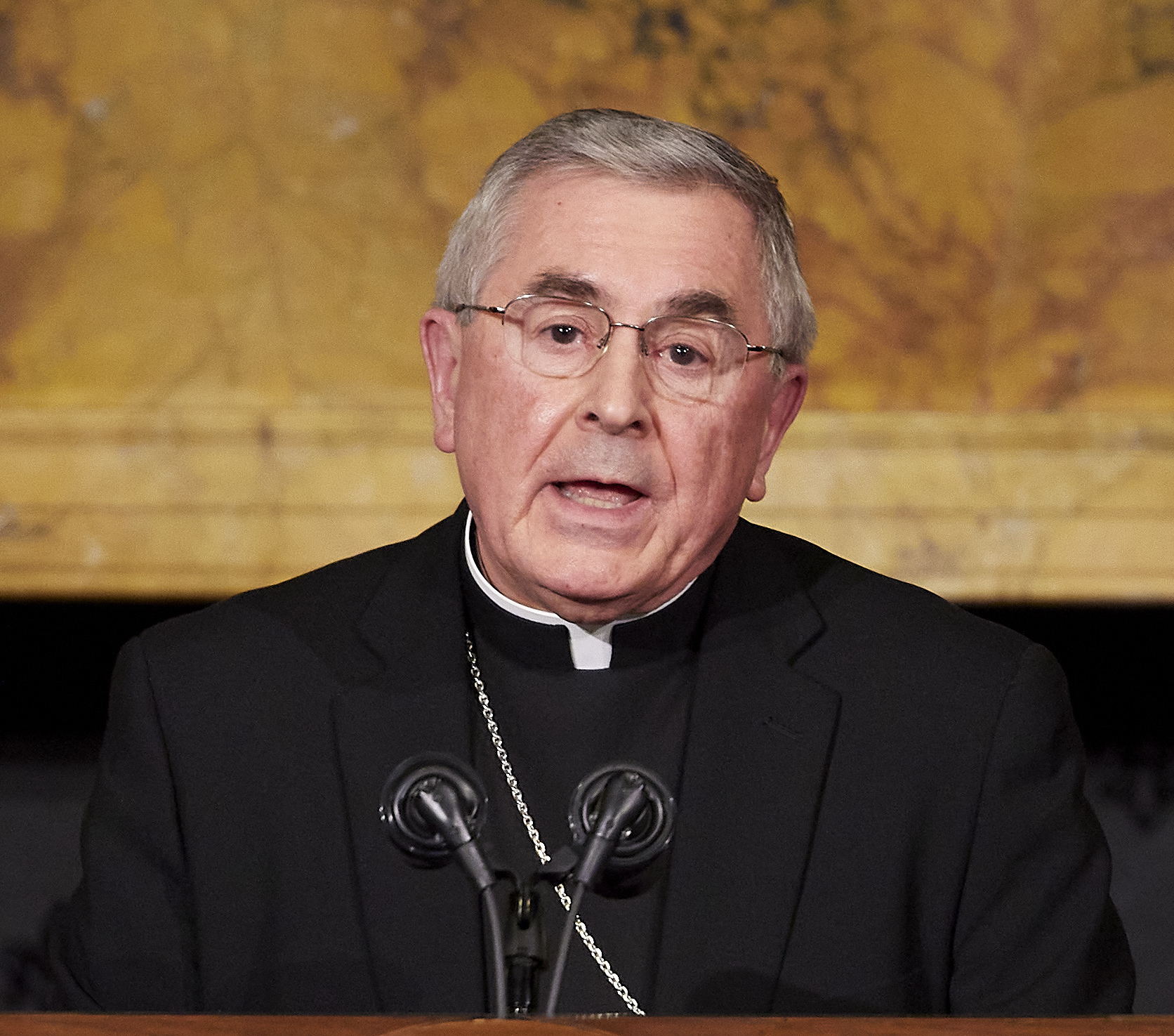
Bishop Gainer (2022)

In 1989, Monsignor Nicholas C. Dattilo of Pittsburgh was appointed the eighth bishop of Harrisburg by John Paul II. As bishop, Dattilo reorganized parishes and missions, because of populations shifts within the fifteen counties of the diocese. The number of parishes was reduced from 120 to 89, resulting in 23 appeals by parishioners to the Vatican and years of protests. In 1998, Dattilo established the Ecclesial Lay Ministry Program, a three-year formation program to prepare trained lay leaders. Following the closure of Villa Vianney, he approved construction for a new residence for retired priests in 1999. He also finalized plans for a diocesan conference center, with the groundbreaking in October 1999. Dattilo died in 2004.

Dattilo was succeeded by Kevin C. Rhoades of Harrisburg in 2004. Rhoades served in Harrisburg until 2009, when he was named bishop of the Diocese of Fort Wayne-South Bend. To replace Rhoades, Pope Benedict XVI named Auxiliary Bishop Joseph P. McFadden of Philadelphia as the next bishop of Harrisburg. McFadden died three years later.

In 2014, Bishop Ronald William Gainer of the Diocese of Lexington was installed as the 11th bishop of Harrisburg. In 2014, Gainer introduced a new policy prohibiting girls at Catholic schools from participating in any wrestling, football, and rugby matches. It also required male wrestlers from Catholic schools to forfeit matches against female opponents on other teams. According to the diocese, the ban applied to sports "... that involve substantial and potentially immodest physical contact." In 2016, a public school, J. P. McCaskey High School in Lancaster, exploited the wrestling policy to win a dual wrestling match against Delone Catholic High School of McSherrystown.

In 2020, the diocese filed for bankruptcy in light of the sex abuse lawsuits. In its bankruptcy filing, the diocese stated that it was struggling financially and had only $1 to $10 million in assets and $50 million in liabilities.

In 2023, Pope Francis appointed Auxiliary Bishop Timothy C. Senior of Philadelphia as the 12th bishop of Harrisburg, where he succeeded Gainer, who had reached the mandatory retirement age of 75.

== Sexual abuse cases ==
Bishop Keeler was notified in 1987 of accusations of sexual abuse against Arthur Long. Keeler also knew that Long had confessed to committing these crimes, but took no action against him. After Keeler was appointed Archbishop of Baltimore in 1989, he allowed Long to transfer to the archdiocese. After the 2018 Pennsylvania grand jury report was released, with its criticism of how Keeler handled the Long case, the archdiocese reversed plans to name a new school after Keeler.

In 1994, the diocese received a complaint from a man who said that Francis Bach had sexually assaulted him in 1969, when the accuser was 13-years-old, on a sleepover on Bach's boat. Bach admitted to molesting 14 other boys. Bach voluntarily retired from ministry and was told to spend the rest of his life in prayer and penance.

William Presley from the Diocese of Erie. In April 2002, three individuals from Erie accused Presley of physical and sexual abuse when they were minors between 1963 and 1974. Presley admitted to sexually abusing the victims; he was permanently removed from ministry. In a 2006 letter to the Vatican, Bishop Rhoades called Presley a "sexual predator."

In early 2016, Pennsylvania Attorney General Josh Shapiro convened a grand jury investigation into sexual abuse by Catholic clergy of children in six Pennsylvania dioceses, including the Diocese of Harrisburg. According to The Philadelphia Inquirer, the Dioceses of Harrisburg and Greensburg attempted to shut down the grand jury investigation in 2017.

In August 2018, the diocese released the names of 45 clergy from the diocese as having credible accusations of sexual abuse. The list also included clergy from other dioceses or from religious orders who had served in the diocese. Following the release of the list, Bishop Gainer announced the removal of the names of the last six bishops from all diocesan facilities due to their collective failure to protect children from sexual abuse. The report also revealed that the diocese had since 2002 been secretly settling cases with sex abuse survivors. Some of settlements required the signing of non-disclosure agreements by the victims. After the report release, Gainer apologized for the sexual abuse on behalf of the diocese and set up a new website titled Youth Protection Home Page.

In August 2019, diocese officials acknowledged that they had paid $12.1 million to 100 sexual abuse survivors that year.

In November 2020, John G. Allen from York County, a laicized priest, pleaded guilty to six misdemeanors (two counts each of indecent assault against a child under 13, indecent assault of a child under 16 and corruption of a minor) for assaulting two altar boys in the diocese between 1997 and 2002. Allen was sentenced to five years of probation.

== Territory ==
The Diocese of Harrisburg covers the following counties: Adams, Columbia, Cumberland, Dauphin, Franklin, Juniata, Lancaster, Lebanon, Mifflin, Montour, Northumberland, Perry, Snyder, Union and York. The Basilica of the Sacred Heart of Jesus in Conewago Township and the Basilica of Saints Cyril and Methodius in Danville are under the jurisdiction of the diocese.

== Bishops ==
=== Bishops of Harrisburg ===
1. Jeremiah F. Shanahan (1868-1886)
2. Thomas McGovern (1888-1898)
3. John W. Shanahan (1899-1916), brother of Jeremiah Shanahan
4. Philip R. McDevitt (1916-1935)
5. George L. Leech (1935-1971)
6. Joseph T. Daley (1971-1983; coadjutor bishop 1967–1971)
7. William Henry Keeler (1983-1989), appointed Archbishop of Baltimore (Cardinal in 1994)
8. Nicholas C. Dattilo (1990-2004)
9. Kevin C. Rhoades (2004-2010), appointed Bishop of Fort Wayne-South Bend
10. Joseph P. McFadden (2010-2013)
11. Ronald William Gainer (2014–2023)
12. Timothy C. Senior (2023–present)

=== Former auxiliary bishops ===
- Lawrence F. Schott (1956–1963)
- Joseph Thomas Daley (1963–1967), appointed Coadjutor Bishop of Harrisburg
- William Henry Keeler (1979–1983), appointed Bishop of Harrisburg

=== Other diocesan priests who became bishops ===
- William J. Waltersheid, appointed Auxiliary Bishop of Pittsburgh in 2011
- Edward C. Malesic, appointed Bishop of Greensburg in 2015, Bishop of Cleveland in 2020

== High schools ==
As of 2025, the Diocese of Harrisburg operates six high schools:

- Bishop McDevitt High School – Harrisburg
- Delone Catholic High School – McSherrystown
- Lancaster Catholic High School – Lancaster
- Our Lady of Lourdes Regional High School – Edgewood Gardens, Coal Township, Pennsylvania
- Trinity High School – Camp Hill
- York Catholic High School – York
