= Saint Charles Borromeo Seminary =

Catholic seminary in Ambler, Pennsylvania, US

St. Charles Borromeo Seminary
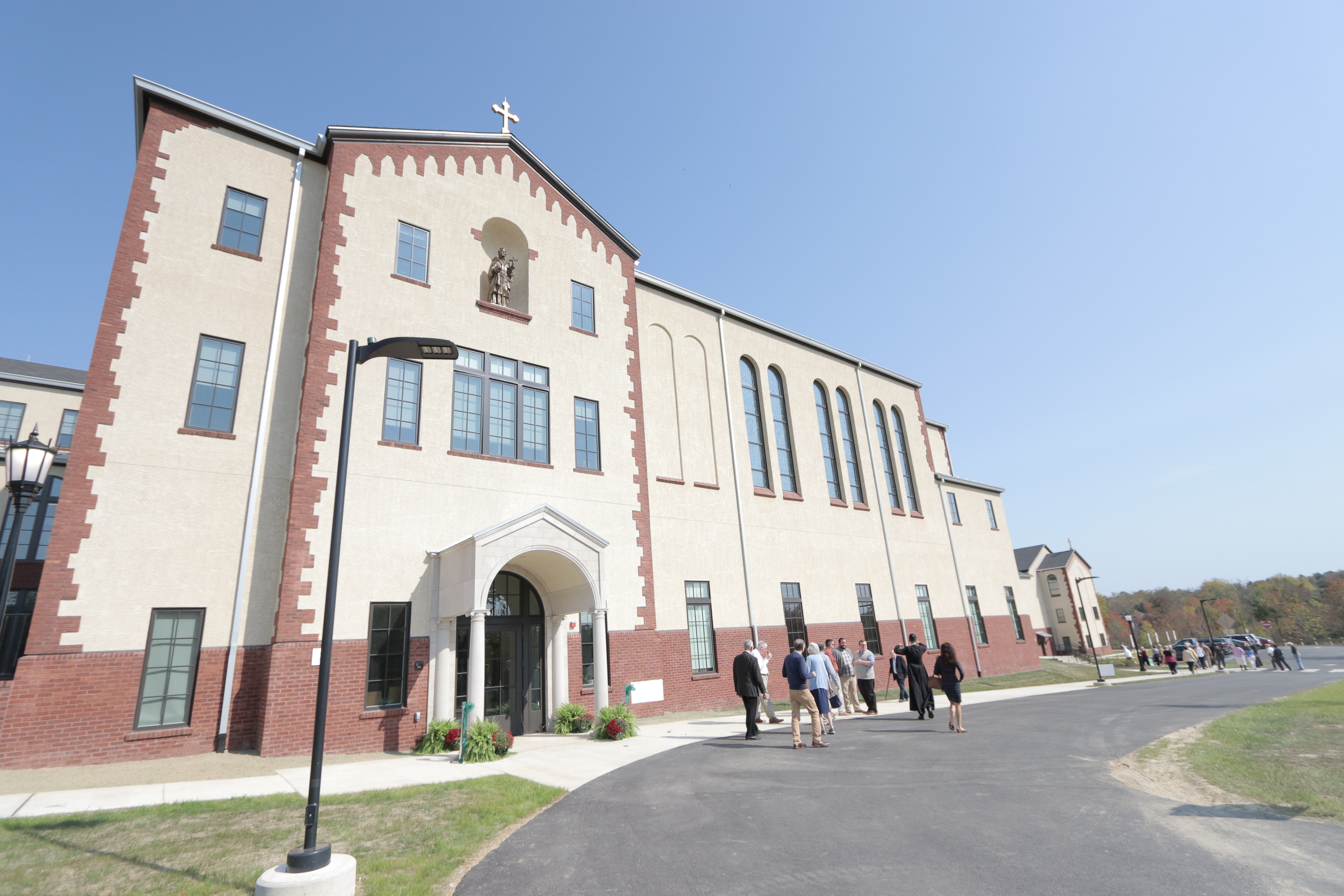
- Student Life Center, Lower Gwynedd Campus
- Motto: Exiit qui seminat (The sower went forth to sow)
- Type: Seminary; Private
- Established: June 1832
- Religious affiliation: Roman Catholic Church
- Rector: T. Christopher Redcay
- Location: Ambler, Pennsylvania, United States; 40°12′05.9″N 75°13′59.6″W
- Website: www.scs.edu

Saint Charles Borromeo Seminary is a Roman Catholic seminary in Ambler, Pennsylvania, that is under the jurisdiction of the Archdiocese of Philadelphia. The oldest Catholic institution of higher learning in the Philadelphia region, the seminary is named after Cardinal Charles Borromeo, an Italian saint from the Counter-Reformation era of the late 1500s.

Saint Charles offers a Bachelor of Arts degree in philosophy program to prepare seminarians for the priesthood. It also has a School of Theology that offers graduate courses in theology for anyone and a School of Diaconal Formation for men wanting to become permanent deacons.

Founded in 1832 in Philadelphia, the school moved to its campus in the Overbrook section of Philadelphia in 1871. Saint Charles moved again in 2024 to a new campus in Ambler, Pennsylvania.

== History ==
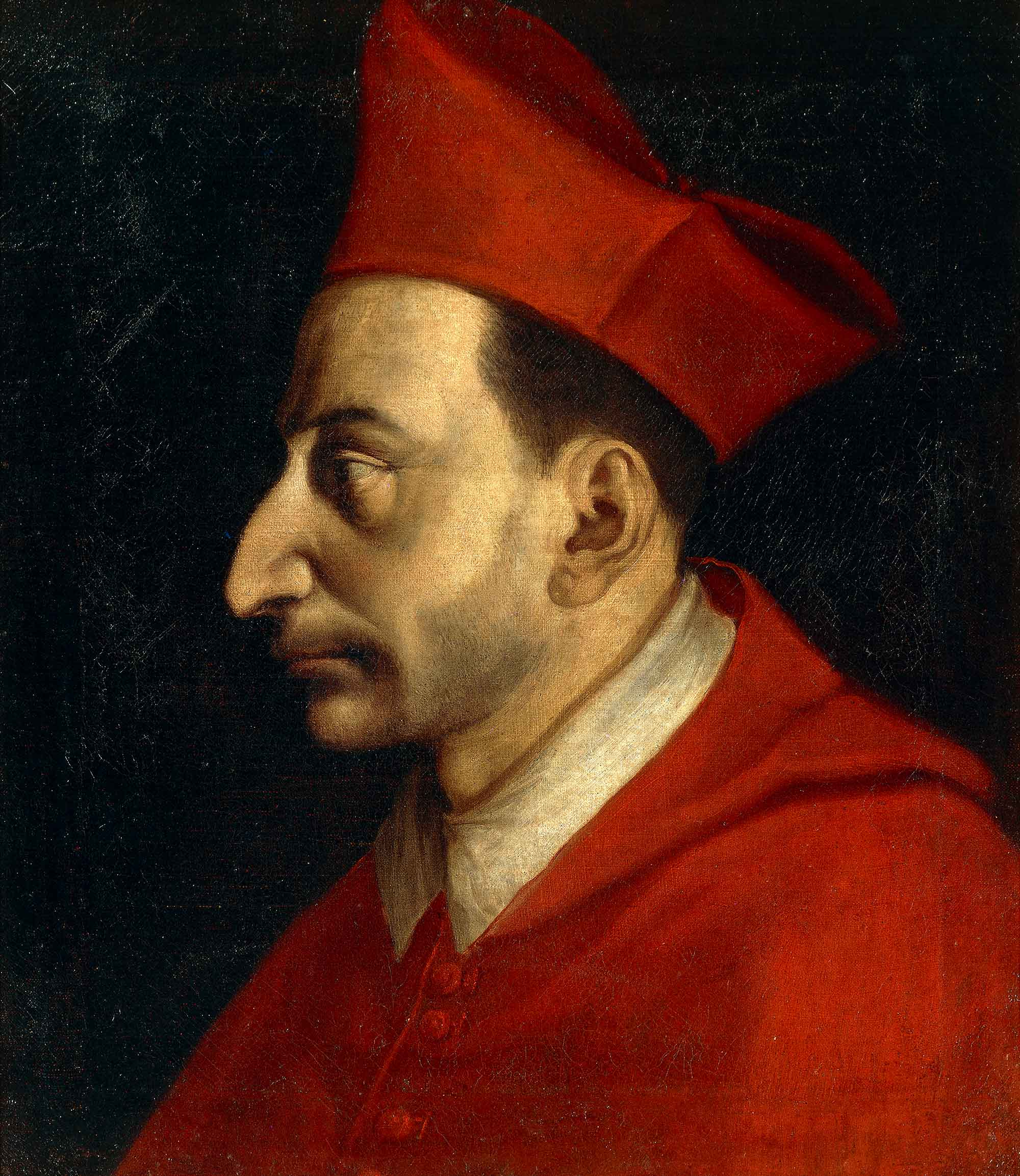
Cardinal Borromeo (1550)

Saint Charles was founded in June 1832 by Francis Kenrick, Bishop of Philadelphia, in his home on Fifth Street. At that time, all of the dioceses in the United States needed more American-born priests to serve the growing Catholic immigrant population. In the beginning, the only faculty members at Saint Charles were Francis Kenrick and his brother, Reverend Peter Kenrick. Francis Kenrick later moved Saint Charles to three buildings on the site of a former church in the city.

In April 1838, Saint Charles was chartered by the Commonwealth of Pennsylvania to grant academic degrees as a major seminary. In January 1839, Kenrick moved the seminary to a three-story building at 18th and Race Streets in Philadelphia. From 1841 to 1852, the Vincentian Order ran the seminary. In the early 1850s, John Neumann established a minor seminary program for Saint Charles in Glen Riddle, Pennsylvania. This program provided high school courses and two years of college to boys wanting to enter the priesthood.

In 1863, James F. Wood purchased three properties in Overbrook to create a new Saint Charles campus. Philadelphia had just experienced a tuberculosis outbreak and he felt that a rural setting would be safer for the seminarians. In September 1871, Wood moved the minor and major seminaries to Overbrook. The total enrollment at that time was 128 students. In December 1875, Wood dedicated the Chapel of the Immaculate Conception on the campus.

In 1909, Saint Charles began construction of the Archbishop Ryan Memorial Library in Overbrook. The St. Martin Chapel was dedicated in 1928. By 1964, Saint Charles had a total enrollment of 550. The archdiocese discontinued the high school program in 1968.

Saint Charles was visited by three cardinals who eventually became popes: Eugenio Pacelli (Pius XII), Giovanni Montini (Paul VI), and Josef Ratzinger (Benedict XVI). In 1979, Pope John Paul II conducted a large open-air Mass by the seminary. The diocese erected a large cross on the property for the occasion.

Pope Francis stayed at Saint Charles during his 2015 papal visit to Philadelphia.

In 2019, the archdiocese sold its Wynnewood property to Main Line Health. In May 2024, workers moved the historic white cross on the Wynnewood campus to the Malvern Retreat House. It was initially erected in honor of John Paul II's 1979 visit to Philadelphia.

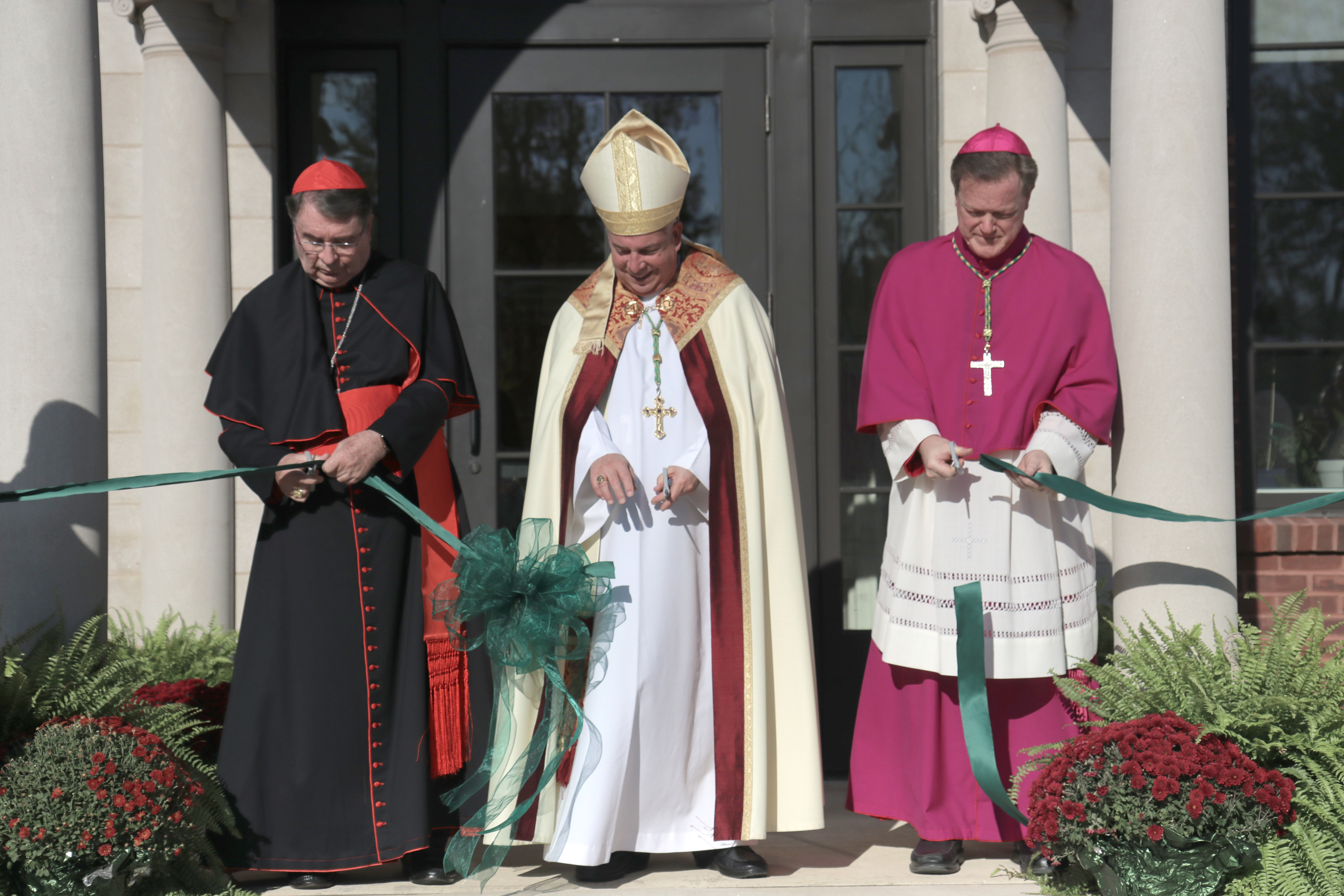
Ribbon-cutting ceremony, Saint Charles Borromeo Seminary, (2024)

Saint Charles moved in August 2024 to its new campus adjacent to Gwynedd Mercy University in Ambler. On September 8, 2024, Nelson J. Pérez, Archbishop of Philadelphia, dedicated the Chapel of the Immaculate Conception on the new campus. On October 12, 2024, Pérez blessed and dedicated the campus. Christophe Pierre, apostolic nuncio to the United States, spoke during the ceremony.

Pérez in January 2025 announced that Christopher Redcay would become the next rector of Saint Charles in July 2025.

== Academics ==
St. Charles is accredited by the Middle States Commission on Higher Education and the Association of Theological Schools in the United States and Canada. It consists of three divisions:

- Priestly formation
- School of Theological Studies
- School of Diaconal Formation

=== Priestly formation ===
This is a program for Catholic men who want to enter the priesthood. In accordance with the Program for Priestly Formation (PPF) issued by the US Conference of Catholic Bishops, seminarians will complete four stages of priestly formation at Saint Charles: After completing the four stages of priestly formation, seminarians can continue to the four-year curriculum within the School of Theological Studies.

=== School of Theological Studies ===
The School of Theological Studies (STS) is a graduate theology program for priests, members of Religious orders and laypeople of any religious denomination, both men and women. STS conducts evening and daytime classes during the summer, on both the graduate and undergraduate levels as well as various non-certificate programs. The STS offers a Master of Arts in theology degree.

=== School of Diaconal Formation ===
The School of Diaconal Formation (SDF) is a program for Catholic laymen to become permanent deacons. Candidates complete six years of formation at SDF before their ordination as permanent deacons.

== Student body ==
=== Enrollment ===
At the start of the 2026–2027 academic year, Saint Charles had a total enrollment of 151 seminarians. These men came from the Archdiocese of Philadelphia, as well as the seminary's 18 partner dioceses and religious orders.

=== Partners ===
The partner dioceses include:

- Diocese of Allentown
- Diocese of Arlington
- Diocese of Baltimore
- Diocese of Bridgeport
- Archdiocese of Colombo
- Diocese of Columbus
- Diocese of Đà Lạt
- Diocese of Greensburg
- Diocese of Harrisburg
- Diocese of Lincoln
- Archdiocese for the Military Services, USA
- Diocese of Mymensingh
- Archdiocese of Newark
- Diocese of Portland
- Diocese of Trenton
- Ukrainian Catholic Archeparchy of Philadelphia

The partner religious congregations and orders include:

- Vincentians
- Oratory of Saint Philip Neri

== List of rectors ==
Name	Dates served
Francis Kenrick	1832–1835
Peter Kenrick	1835–1837
Edward Barron	1837–1839
Michael O'Connor	1839–1841
Mariano Maller	1841–1847
John B. Tornatore	1847–1848
Thaddeus Amat y Brusi	1848–1852
John B. Tornatore	1852–1853
William O'Hara	1853–1861
Maurice A. Walsh	1861–1864
James O’Connor	1864–1872
James Corcoran	1872–1873
Charles P. O’Connor	1873–1879
William Kieran	1879–1886
John Fitzmaurice	1886–1898
Patrick J. Garvey	1898–1908
Henry T. Drumgoole	1908–1920
Edmond Fitzmaurice	1920–1925
Joseph M. Corrigan	1925–1936
Vincent L. Burns (1891–1960)	1936–1946
Francis Furey	1946–1958
John P. Connery	1958–1966
Thomas Welsh	1966–1974
Vincent L. Burns	1974–1985
Francis X. DiLorenzo	1985–1988
Daniel A. Murray	1988–1994
James Molloy	1994–1999
Michael Burbidge	1999–2004
Joseph G. Prior	2004–2010
Shaun Mahoney	2010–2012
Timothy C. Senior	2012–2022
Keith J. Chylinski	2022–2025
T. Christopher Redcay	2025–present
