= Cathedral of the Blessed Sacrament (Altoona, Pennsylvania) =

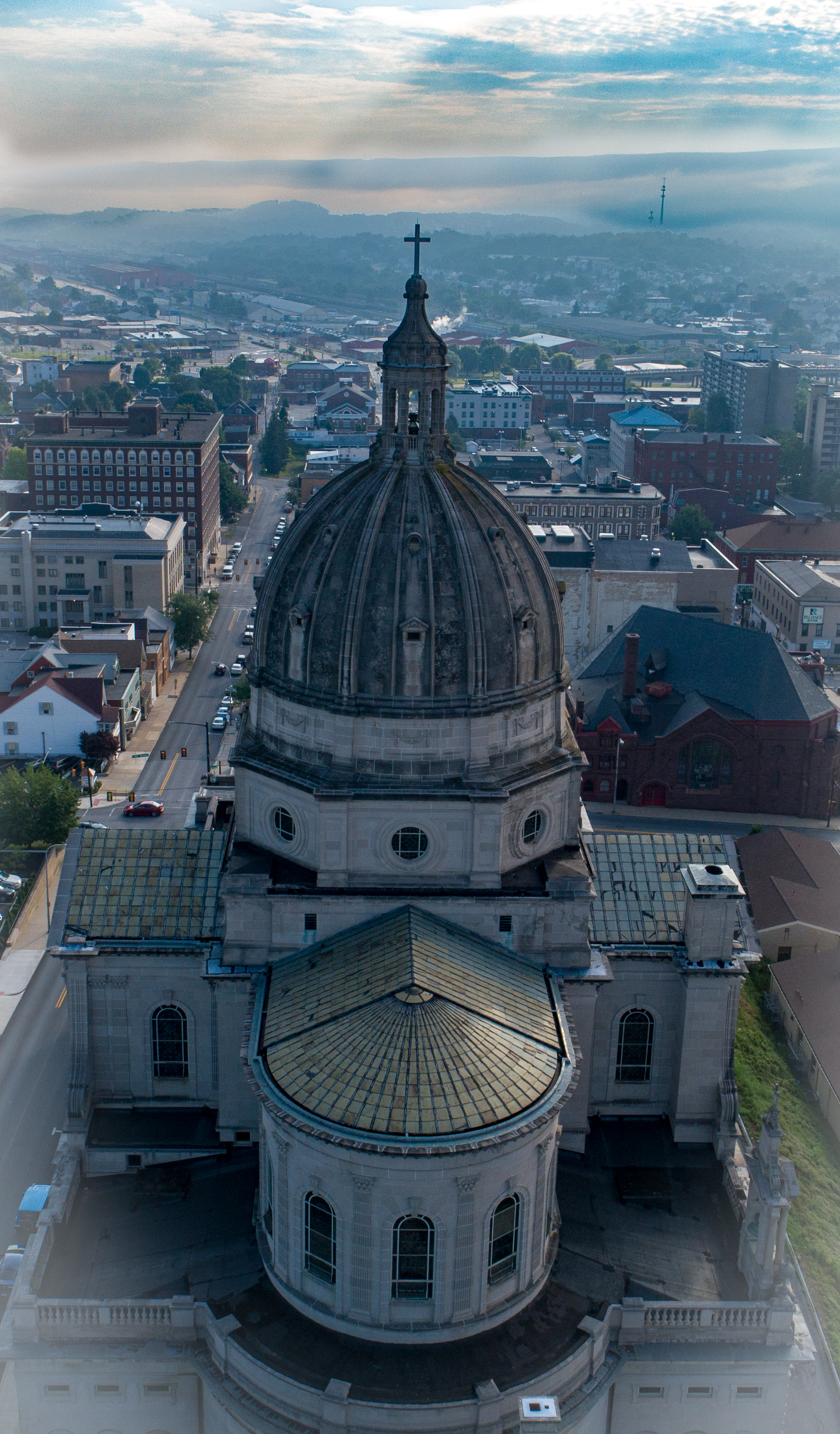
- Cathedral of the Blessed Sacrament in 2018

- Location in Pennsylvania Cathedral of the Blessed Sacrament (the United States)
- 40°30′56.88″N 78°24′14.4″W
- Location: One Cathedral Square; Altoona, Pennsylvania
- Country: United States
- Denomination: Roman Catholic Church
- Website: www.altoonacathedral.org

History
- Status: Cathedral/Parish church
- Founded: 1851
- Dedication: Blessed Sacrament
- Dedicated: November 13, 1960

Architecture
- Architect: George I. Lovatt, Sr.
- Style: Renaissance Revival
- Groundbreaking: September 17, 1924

Specifications
- Length: 264 feet (80 m)
- Width: 120 feet (37 m)
- Materials: Limestone

Administration
- Diocese: Altoona-Johnstown

Clergy
- Bishop: Mark Bartchak
- Pastor(s): Monsignor Stanley B. Carson, Rector
- Cathedral of the Blessed Sacrament
- U.S. Historic district – Contributing property
- Part of: Downtown Altoona Historic District (ID9200094)
- Added to NRHP: July 24, 1992

The Cathedral of the Blessed Sacrament is a Roman Catholic cathedral located at One Cathedral Square in Altoona, Pennsylvania. It is within the boundaries of the Downtown Altoona Historic District, and was added to the National Register of Historic Places in 1992. It is the mother church of the Diocese of Altoona-Johnstown and is the seat of its bishop, the Most Reverend Mark Leonard Bartchak. The Cathedral of the Blessed Sacrament Rector is Rev. Monsignor Stanley B. Carson.

== History ==
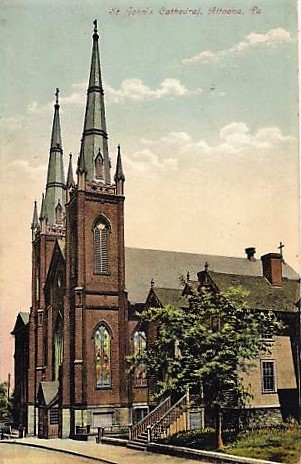
St. John's Pro-Cathedral

The first Mass in Altoona was celebrated by the Reverend John Walsh, pastor of St. Mary Church in Hollidaysburg, Pennsylvania. Although it is not known for certain, it was probably in 1850. The first church in town, St. John the Evangelist, was dedicated the following year. The first resident pastor was the Reverend John Tuigg, who was assigned by Bishop Michael O'Connor of the Diocese of Pittsburgh in 1853. When the Diocese of Altoona was established in 1901, St. John's Church became the pro-cathedral.

It was during the pastorate of the Reverend Morgan Sheedy that the present cathedral was begun. St. John's Pro-Cathedral was torn down to make room for the new building, and a temporary hall was built on Twelfth Avenue to serve as a place of worship. Philadelphia architect George I. Lovatt, Sr., who also designed the Cathedral of St. Patrick in Harrisburg, was chosen to design the new cathedral. Local contractor Alfred D. Reid constructed the building. The three-story rectory was built at the same time, and it is attached to the cathedral by a hyphen.

Ground for the present cathedral was broken on September 17, 1924, and the cornerstone was laid on May 30, 1926. That date was the 25th anniversary of the erection of Diocese of Altoona. Construction came to a halt in 1929 due to the Stock Market Crash. Construction resumed and the unfinished cathedral was opened for public worship on September 7, 1931. The interior remained incomplete with walls of bare brick and rough concrete surrounding worshipers. Over the next 28 years Bishop Richard Guilfoyle, the third bishop of the diocese, accumulated the funds for the cathedral's completion. However, he died before work could begin. Guilfoyle's successor, Bishop Howard Carroll, began the work but died within a year. Work had progressed so fast, however, that his funeral was celebrated in March 1960 in the nearly completed cathedral. On November 13, 1960, Bishop J. Carroll McCormick formally opened the cathedral.

== Architecture ==
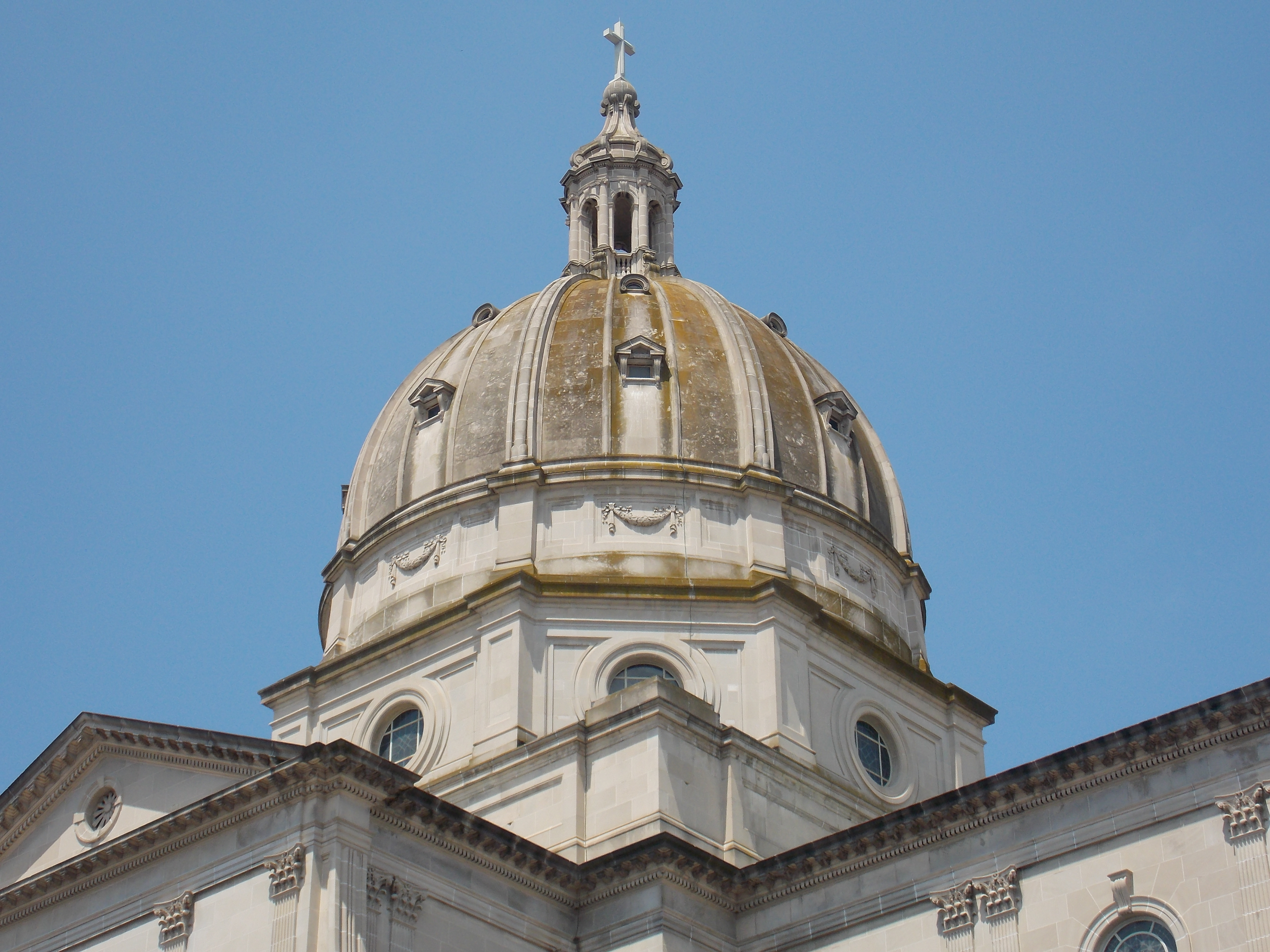
Cathedral dome

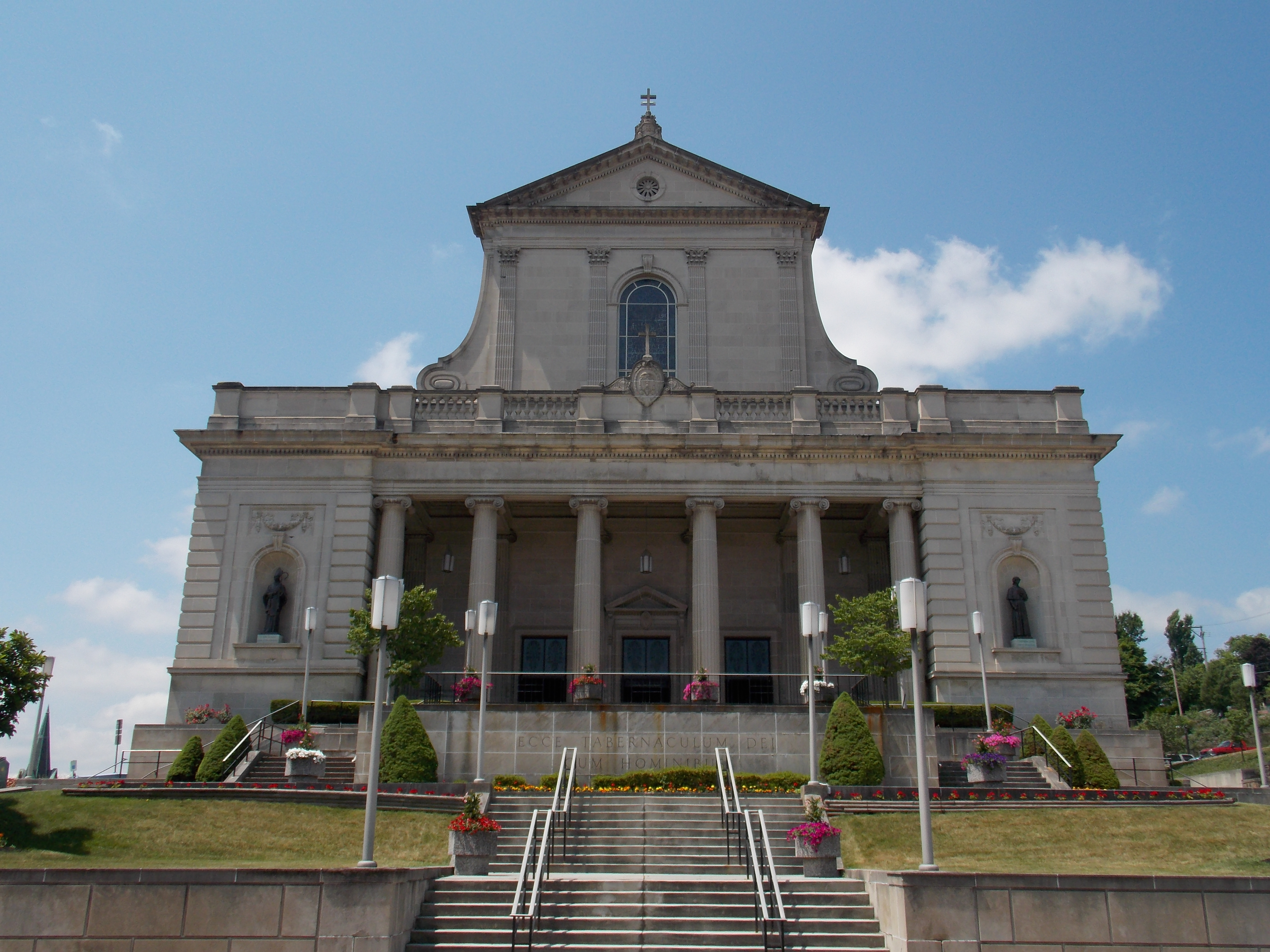
Cathedral facade

=== Exterior ===
The cathedral's main feature is its dome that rises to a height of 198 feet (60 m). It reflects an academic interpretation of Italy's early Renaissance cathedrals. The dome incorporates elements from those on St. Peter's Basilica in Rome and the Florence Cathedral. It features 24 windows: eight round windows are located at the base, eight dormer windows are on the second tier, and eight eyebrow windows near the top. There is also a skylight at the pinnacle of the dome. Given its location on the peak of Gospel Hill, the cathedral is a visual landmark for the city of Altoona.

Forty-eight stone steps rise in sections along a broad terrace from the street to the main entrance. A Latin phrase is etched onto the stone wall along the staircase: Ecce tabernaculum Dei cum hominibus (Behold the dwelling place of God with men). The main facade features an entrance portico with six Ionic columns in antis. The pedimented portion above it is similar to that of Santa Maria Novella in Florence. The steel and reinforced concrete construction is covered with a veneer of Indiana limestone laid in courses of smooth-faced ashlar.

The main doors into the cathedral are etched glass produced by Baut Studios of Pittsburgh, and they were installed when Monsignor Thomas Madden was pastor/rector (1972–1987). The two center doors portray Jesus at the Last Supper. On the right door he holds the bread and on the other door he holds the cup, that become his body and blood. They are flanked with doors that are etched with the traditional symbols of the four Evangelists: Matthew (angel), Luke (ox), Mark (lion), and John (eagle). On either side of the main facade are statues of two American saints. Saint John Neumann (1811–1860), an immigrant, Bishop of Philadelphia, and the first American male saint is on the left. On the right is Saint Elizabeth Ann Seton (1774–1821), an educator who became the first American-born saint.

In the Fall of 2015, Monsignor Robert Mazur, Cathedral Rector, 1995-2025, announced a major campaign (Moving Forward in Faith) to acquire the former Kopp Pharmacy Building adjacent to the Cathedral Rectory to move the CCD classes away from the former Cathedral school due to the school's advanced age, and also moving the parish offices out of the Rectory. The hard decision was made to raze the former Cathedral school, and convent, due to costs required for repair. Additional parking was made for The Cathedral upon the demolition of both buildings. The Kopp Pharmacy building was renovated to meet the needs of the Parish and was named “Cathedral Parish Center”

=== Interior ===
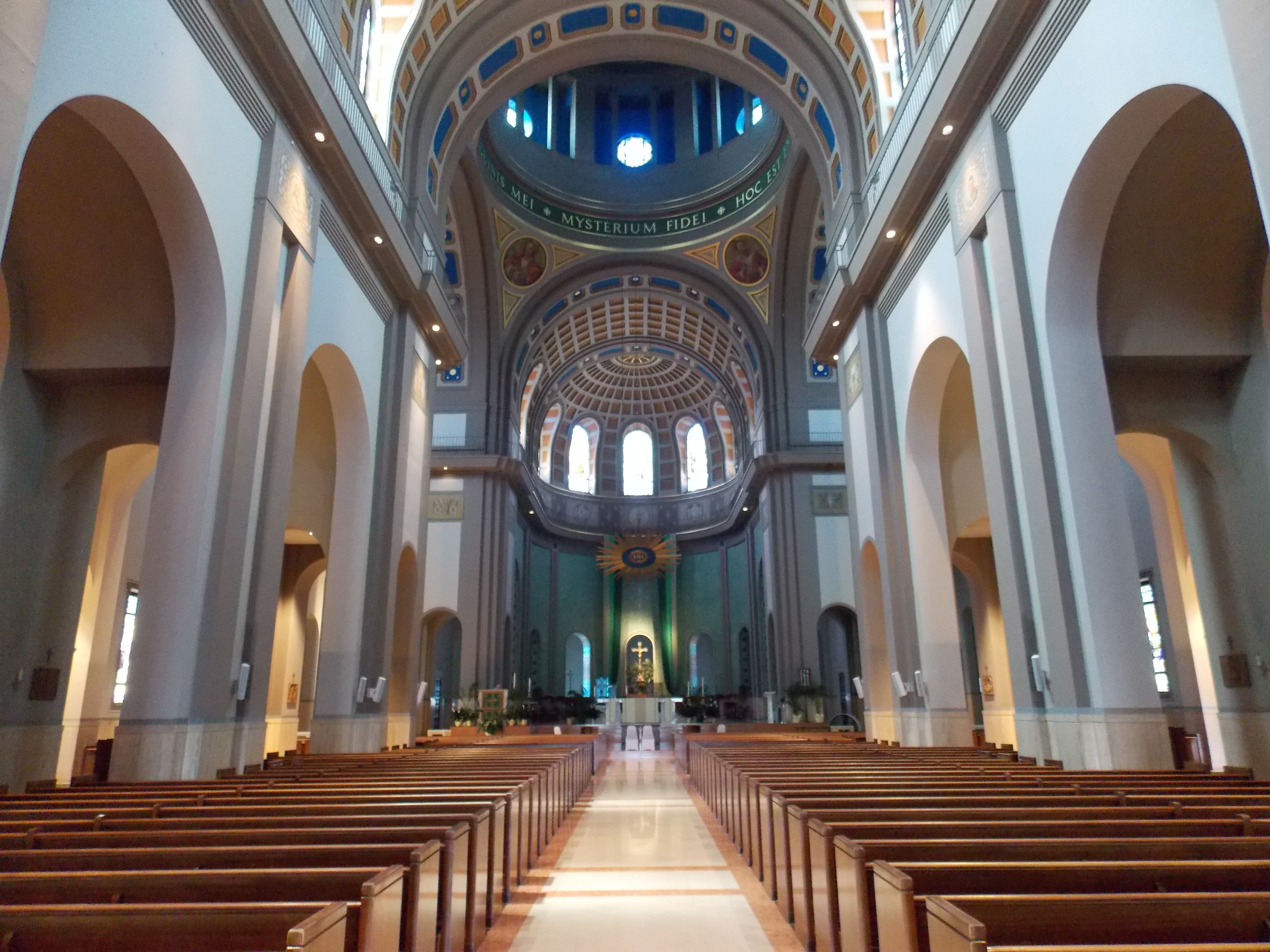
The cathedral interior

While the exterior follows a more historical vocabulary, the interior is more modern. It was designed by Alfred Reid of Pittsburgh. The baptismal font is placed at the entrance of the cathedral, serving to bring parishioners into the Church metaphorically. The nave is divided into three sections by six large piers. Along the base of the vault of the nave are images of six holy men and women, each of whom has a special connection to the Blessed Sacrament: Saint Tarsicius, Saint Thomas Aquinas, Saint Paschal Baylon, Blessed Juliana of Mount Cornillon, Saint Clare of Assisi, and Blessed Imelda Lambertini.

The dome is located over the crossing. From the floor to the eye of the dome is 152 feet (46 m). At its base is written Hoc est enim Corpus Meum. Hic est enim Calix Sanguinis Mei. Mysterium Fidei. (This is My Body. This is the Cup of My Blood. The Mystery of Faith.) Along the base of the dome and the sanctuary are also several symbols of the Eucharist: wheat, grapes, wine, loaves of bread, a fish, a monstrance, a chalice and host, and a pelican. Below the dome on the pendentives are medallions of the four Evangelists.

The altar is the central element in the cathedral. It is around the altar that the faithful gather to celebrate Eucharist. It is 12 feet (3.7 m) long, a number which is significant in its association with the number of the Apostles and the tribes of Israel. Above the altar hangs a golden tester.

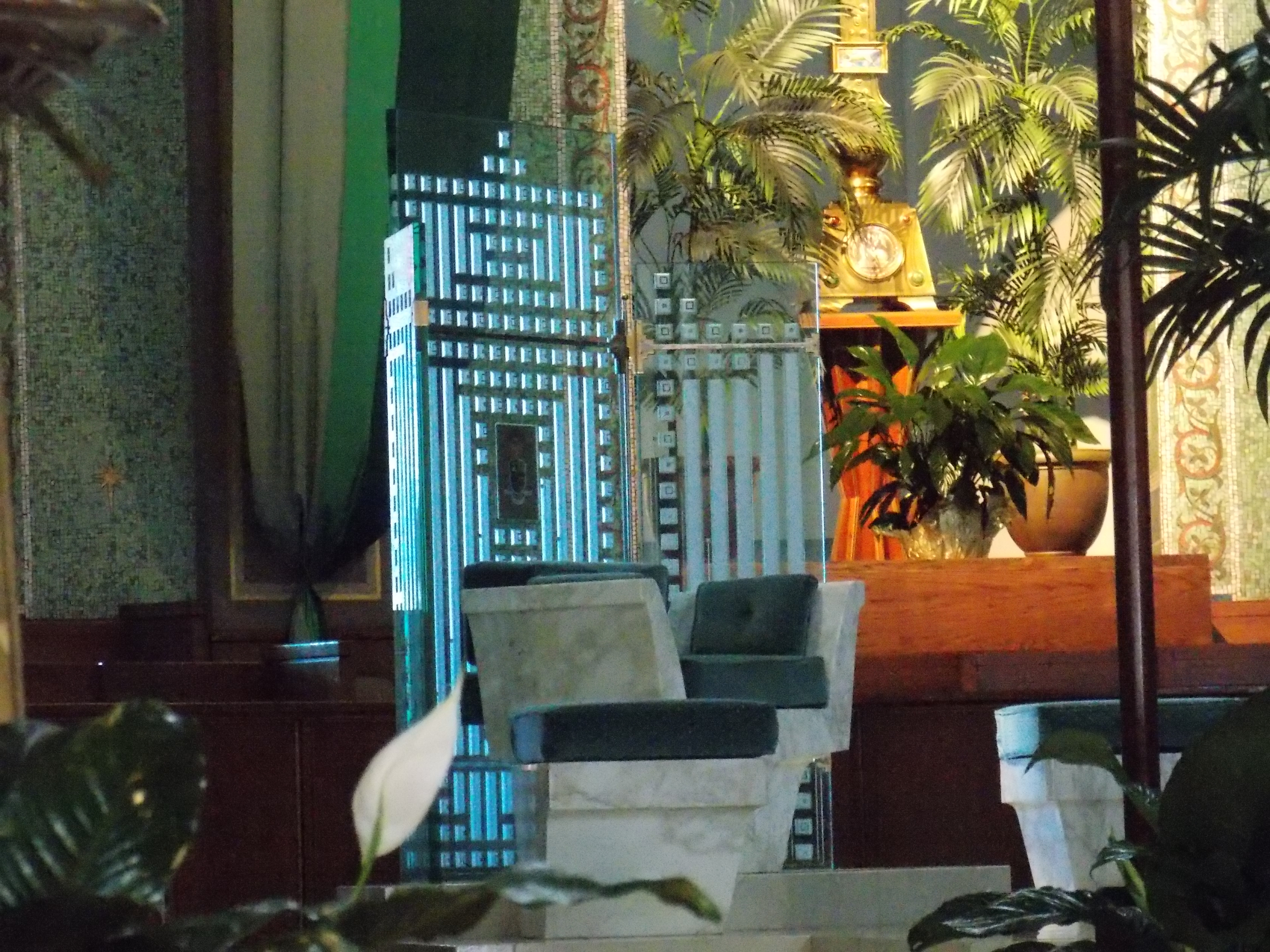
The cathedra

There are seven sanctuary stained glass windows that consist of The Annunciation, The Nativity, The Last Supper, The Crucifixion, The Resurrection, The Ascension, and The Crowning of Mary. The windows in the cathedral created since 1986 were produced by Hunt Studios in Pittsburgh.

Directly below the altar in the basement, a chapel mausoleum named "the crypt chapel" was erected for the entombment of bishops for the Diocese of Altoona-Johnstown. Seven bishops and two rectors of the cathedral are entombed in the crypt chapel, with coat of arms erected on the crypt door: Eugene A. Garvey, John J. McCort, Richard T. Guilfoyle, Howard J. Carroll, J. Carroll McCormick James J. Hogan, and Joseph V. Adamec. Monsignor Thomas Madden, Cathedral Rector, 1972-1987, and Administrator of the Diocese on three separate occasions, 1957-1958, 1960, and 1966 as the Diocese awaited a new bishop, and Monsignor Paul Panza, Cathedral Rector, 1987-1995, are also Entombed.

== Pipe organ ==
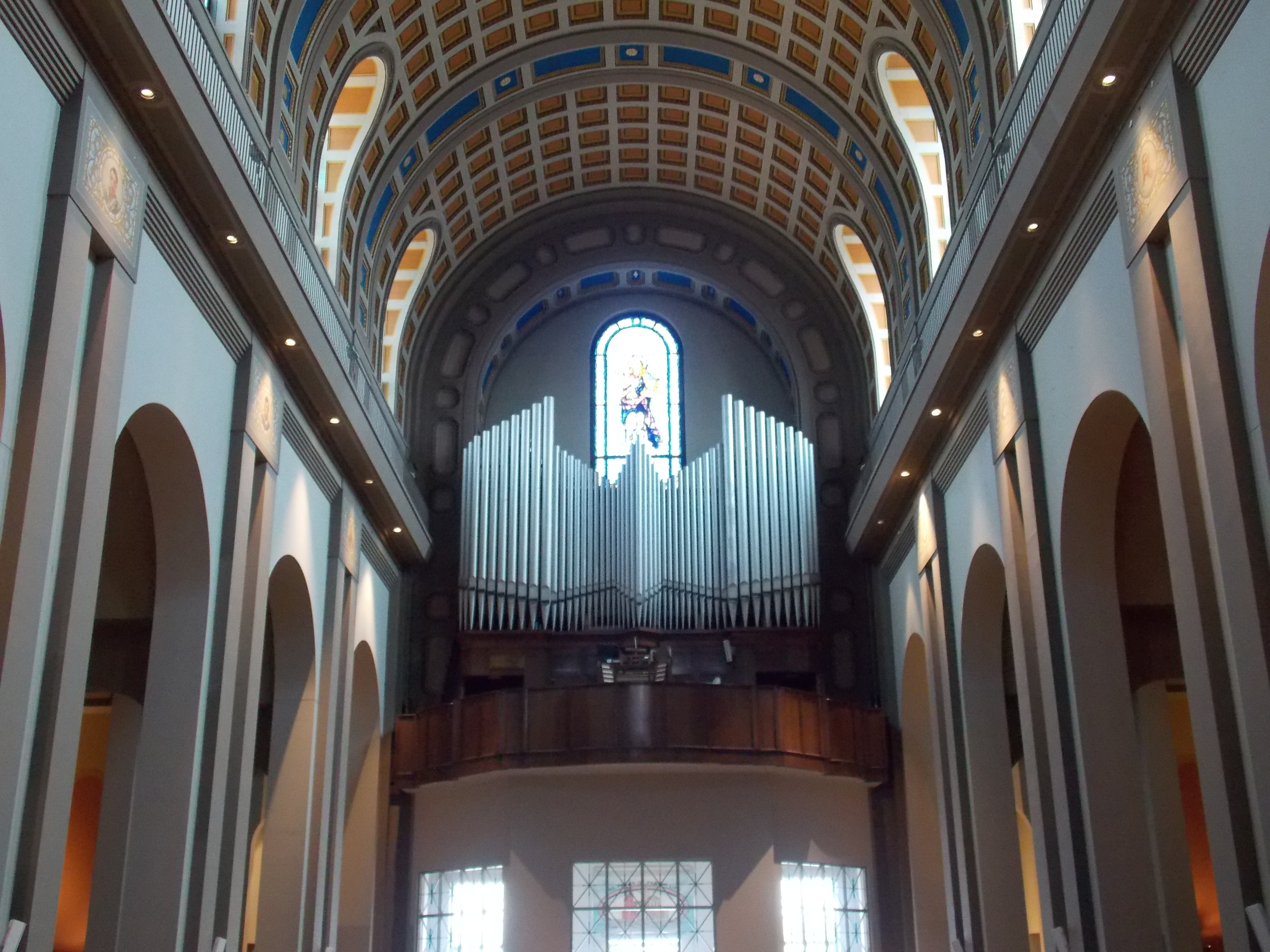
Pipe organ in the rear gallery

The cathedral is home to an organ, built in 1931 by the German firm of G.F. Steinmeyer and Company, bearing the Opus Number 1543. Mrs. Annie C. Wolf donated the funds for the organ's commissioning and installation. The original stoplist encompassed 62 stops and 83 ranks, with four divisions controlled by a four-manual console A division with 19 stops located in the Sanctuary was planned, but never realized. Yet the console with built with only 17 blank stop tabs. The dedication recital was played by Ludwig Berberich, the project consultant, on 24 July 1931. The organ underwent mechanical repair by the Aeolian-Skinner firm in 1954. Damage brought on by drastic seasonal changes of humidity and the cathedral's overactive heating system required a removal and cleaning of all pipes, a re-wiring of parts of the relay system and a repair of cracked windchests. This was done by two Steinmeyer employees in 1959. At the same time, tonal alterations were made in the Choir Division. These tonal changes were reversed in the process of the complete restoration of the organ in 1992 by the Columbia Organ Works firm. This historic organ is one of the focal points in the cathedral. In 1997, the organ was featured on "The Joy of Music," with the festival choir, under the direction of Robert Long. The organ stands below the stained glass window of Saint Cecilia, patroness of music and musicians.

== Pastors ==
The pastors of the Cathedral of the Blessed Sacrament:

- Rev. John Tuigg, 1853–76
- Rev. John Walsh, 1876–80
- Rev. Thomas Ryan, 1880–83
- Most Rev. John Tuigg, 1883–89
- Administrators: Rev. Nicholas O'Reilly and Rev. Thomas Smith
- Rev. Edward Bush, 1890–94
- Rev. Morgan Sheedy, 1894–1939 (named first Rector in 1901)
- Rev. Msgr. Ildephonse Denny, 1939–72
- Rev. Msgr. Thomas Madden, PA, 1972–87
- Rev. Msgr. Paul Panza, PA, 1987–95
- Rev. Msgr. Robert Mazur, 1995–2025
- Very Rev. Alan Thomas, VG, 2019 (Administrator)
- Rev. Msgr. Stanley Carson, 2019-2025, Administrator, 2025–present, Rector

== See also ==
- St. John Gualbert Cathedral (Johnstown, Pennsylvania)
- List of Catholic cathedrals in the United States
- List of cathedrals in the United States
