= SJCA (disambiguation) =

SJCA most frequently refers to St. John's College (Annapolis/Santa Fe).

SJCA may also refer to:

- Sage Junior College of Albany, New York, US
- Saint Joseph's Catholic Academy (Boalsburg, Pennsylvania), US
- San Jose, California, city in the United States
- St. Julien's Creek Annex, American naval support facility
- Scottish Junior Chess Association, an association of Chess Scotland
