= Joseph Victor Adamec =

American Roman Catholic prelate (1935–2019)

His Excellency, The Most Reverend Joseph Victor Adamec
- Bishop of Altoona–Johnstown
- Church: Roman Catholic
- See: Diocese of Altoona–Johnstown
- Appointed: March 12, 1987
- Installed: May 20, 1987
- Term ended: January 14, 2011
- Predecessor: James John Hogan
- Successor: Mark Leonard Bartchak

Orders
- Ordination: June 3, 1960 by Luigi Traglia
- Consecration: May 20, 1987 by Jozef Tomko, James John Hogan, and Francis Frederick Reh

Personal details
- Born: August 13, 1935 Bannister, Michigan, US
- Died: March 20, 2019 (aged 83) Hollidaysburg, Pennsylvania, US
- Motto: Household of God

Styles of Joseph Victor Adamec
- Reference style: His Excellency; The Most Reverend
- Spoken style: Your Excellency
- Religious style: Bishop

Joseph Victor Adamec (August 13, 1935 – March 20, 2019) was an American prelate of the Roman Catholic Church who served as bishop of the Diocese of Altoona-Johnstown in Pennsylvania from 1987 to 2011.

On March 1, 2016, Pennsylvania Attorney General Kathleen Kane implied that as bishop, Adamec led a major cover-up scandal involving the sexual assault of hundreds of children by Diocese of Altoona-Johnstown priests.

== Biography ==
=== Early life ===
Joseph Adamec was born on August 13, 1935, in Bannister, Michigan, the son of Michal August Adamec and Alzbeta Eva Ochran Adamec. He attended Michigan State University in East Lansing, Michigan, from 1953 to 1955. He studied for the priesthood at the Pontifical Nepomucene College in Rome.

=== Priesthood ===
Adamec was ordained to the priesthood by Cardinal Luigi Traglia in the Church of St. Anselm in Rome on July 3, 1960, for the Diocese of Nitra in Slovakia (the former diocese of his parents). He earned a Licentiate in Sacred Theology at the Pontifical Lateran University in Rome in 1961.

Adamec returned to the Diocese of Saginaw, Michigan, where he served as secretary of the bishop and master of ceremonies, ecclesiastical notary, and chancellor of the diocese. In 1980, he received the "Pro Ecclesia et Pontifice" medal which recognized service to the Catholic Church and pope. In 1985, the Vatican elevated Adamec to the rank of prelate of honor. Adamec also served as the national president of the Slovak Catholic Federation, a position he held from 1971 to 1988.

=== Bishop of Altoona-Johnstown ===
On March 12, 1987, Adamec was named the bishop of Altoona-Johnstown by Pope John Paul II. Adamec was consecrated on May 20, 1987, in the Cathedral of the Most Blessed Sacrament in Altoona by Cardinal Jozef Tomko.

Adamec's retirement and the appointment of his successor were announced by Pope Benedict XVI on January 14, 2011. Mark Leonard Bartchak, of the Diocese of Erie, Pennsylvania, was named Adamec's successor.Joseph Adamec died in Hollidaysburg, Pennsylvania, on March 20, 2019, at age 83.

== See also ==
- Catholic Church hierarchy
- Catholic Church in the United States
- Historical list of the Catholic bishops of the United States
- List of Catholic bishops of the United States
- Lists of patriarchs, archbishops, and bishops

== Episcopal succession ==
Catholic Church titles
Preceded by —	Bishop Emeritus of Altoona-Johnstown; 2011–2019	Succeeded by —
Preceded by James John Hogan	Bishop of Altoona-Johnstown; 1987–2011	Succeeded by Mark Leonard Bartchak
