= St. John Gualbert Cathedral (Johnstown, Pennsylvania) =

Historic church in Pennsylvania, United States

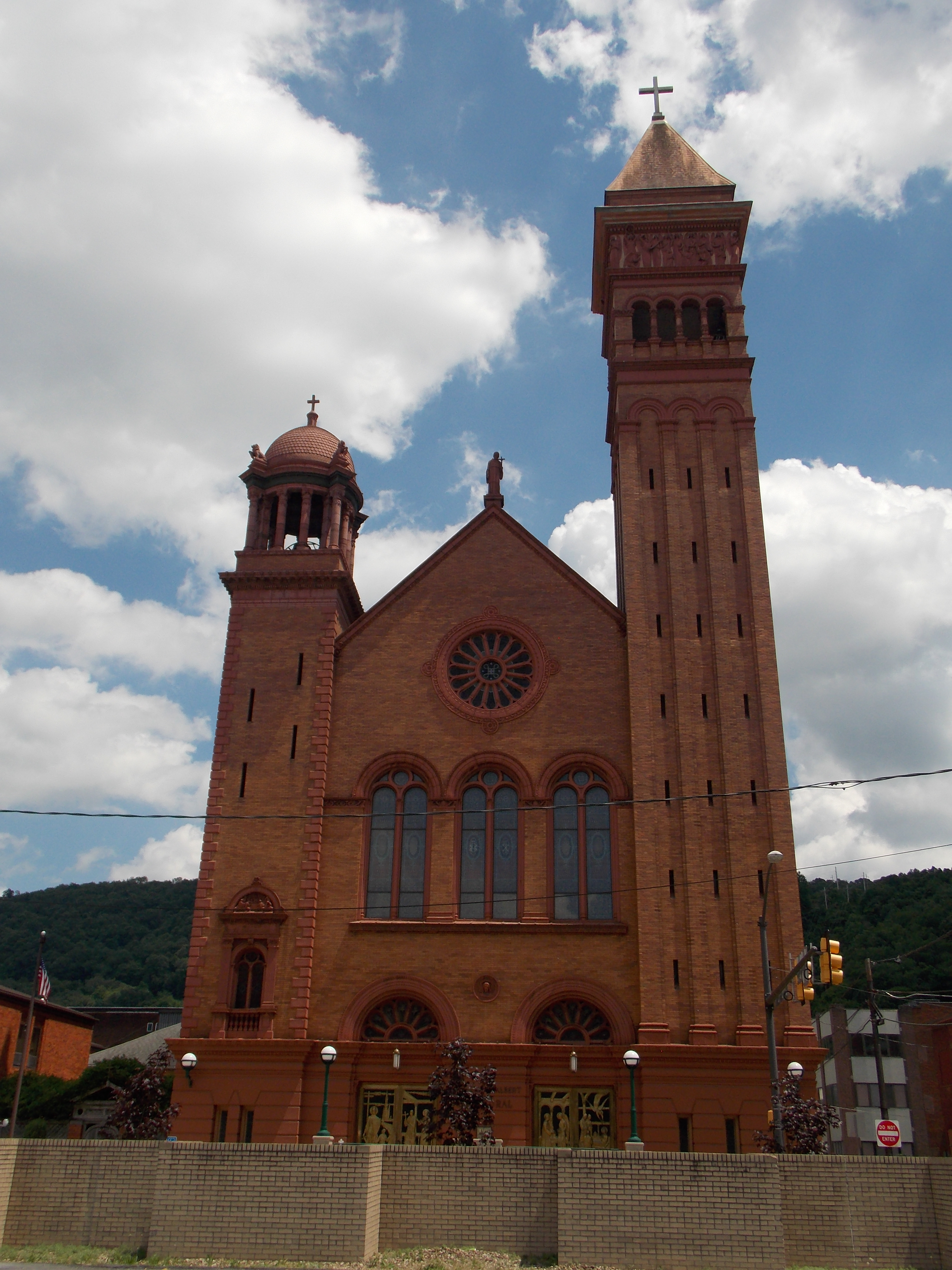

- Location in Pennsylvania St. John Gualbert Cathedral (the United States)
- 40°19′31″N 78°54′55″W
- Location: 117 Clinton St. Johnstown, Pennsylvania
- Country: United States
- Denomination: Roman Catholic Church
- Website: www.stjohngualbert.org

History
- Status: Co-cathedral/Parish
- Founded: 1835

Architecture
- Architect(s): Louis and M. J. Beezer; Comes, Perry, and McMullen
- Style: Italianate; Romanesque Revival
- Completed: 1895
- Construction cost: $75,000

Specifications
- Length: 124 feet (38 m)
- Width: 66 feet (20 m)
- Materials: Steel, brick, terra cotta

Administration
- Diocese: Altoona-Johnstown

Clergy
- Bishop: Mark Bartchak
- Rector: Matthew Baum
- St. John Gualbert Cathedral
- U.S. Historic district – Contributing property
- Location within Pennsylvania Location within the United States
- Part of: Downtown Johnstown Historic District (ID92000941)
- Added to NRHP: August 7, 1992

St. John Gualbert Cathedral is the co-cathedral of the Roman Catholic Diocese of Altoona–Johnstown, located in Johnstown, Pennsylvania, United States. It is also a contributing property in the Downtown Johnstown Historic District on the National Register of Historic Places.

== Architectural history ==
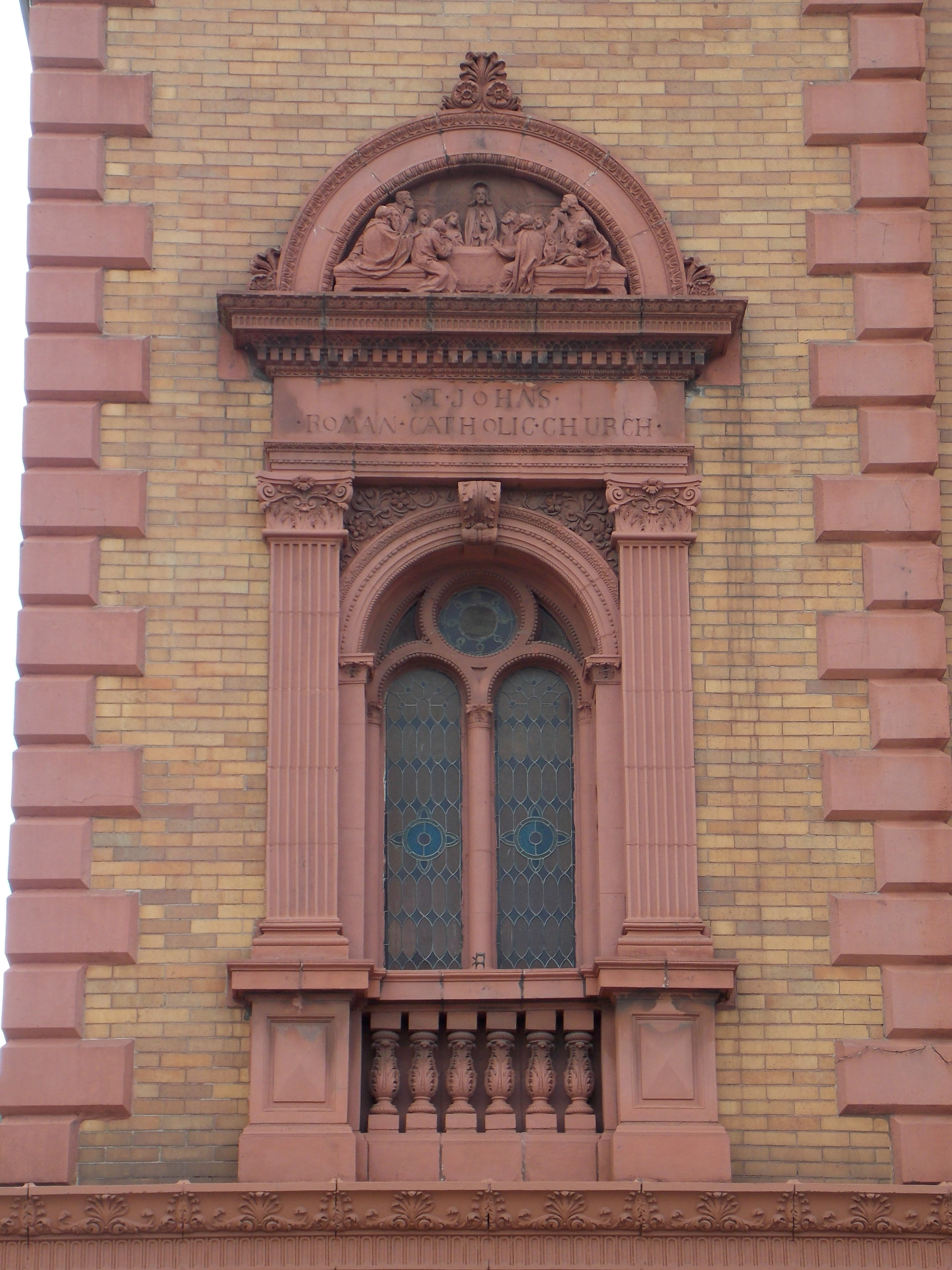
Window on the north tower

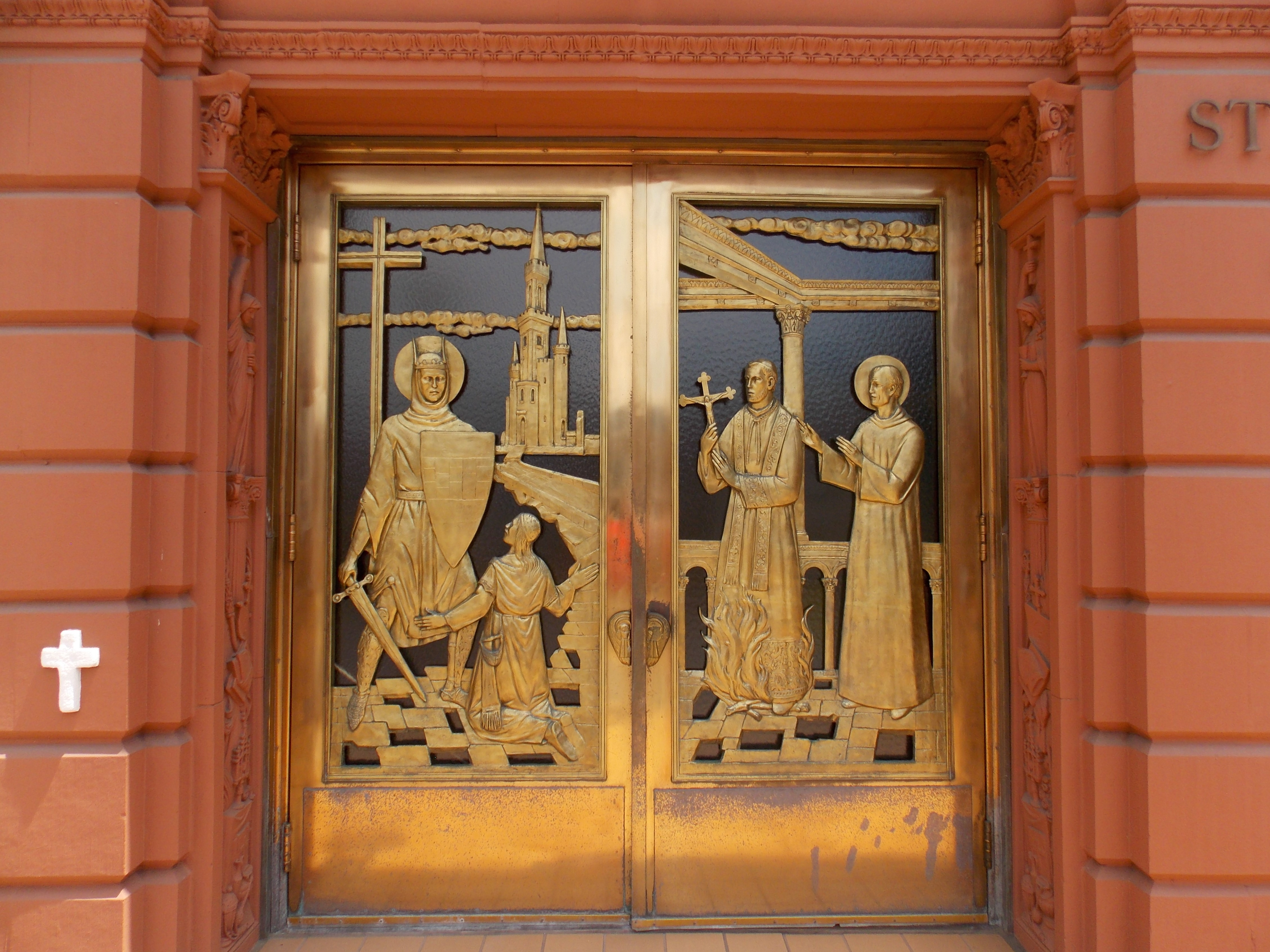
One set of the bronze doors

=== Construction ===
The architects of St. John Gualbert Church were natives of Altoona, Louis and M. J. Beezer. Bricklayers, an architectural monthly published in Boston, stated at the time, "Constructively and artistically, this design offers a great deal of interest. As far as we can recollect at this moment, it is the only building of its kind in existence."

The most unusual feature of the church's construction is its steel superstructure: almost 170,000 pounds (77,000 kg) of steel were used to construct the foundation. Another 420,000 pounds (190,000 kg) were used for the structure of the nave and roof. The prodigious amount of steel used—that is, about 590,000 pounds (270,000 kg)—allowed the cross to be placed in its position at the highest point of the tower several days before the cornerstone was laid; the roof was completed before the foundation walls were even constructed. Construction on the church began on August 7, 1895, and was completed at a cost of $75,000. The cornerstone was laid on October 13, 1895.

=== Exterior ===
The cathedral building extends 66 feet (20 m) in width on Clinton Street and 124 feet (38 m) in length on Locust Street, and the main body of the church is 47 feet (14 m) tall. The 180-foot (55 m) high campanile on the right side of the facade was built in an Italianate style, with decorative details illustrating ecclesiastical ceremonies and traditions. St Mark's Campanile in Venice, Italy was the inspiration for this tower. Given that the original campanile in Venice collapsed in 1902 and was rebuilt two years later, this one in Johnstown is nearly a decade older. The smaller, 104-foot (32 m) tall tower on the left houses the church's 3,200-pound (1,500 kg) bell, which once occupied the tower of an older church in Johnstown. The bell had survived a fall from its belfry during the 1889 Johnstown Flood, and was recast in 1890.

The roof of the church was originally laid in earthen Spanish tile, but was replaced with slate in 1915. The shingles currently in place were laid in 1994 due to deterioration of the slate and to reduce the weight of the roof. Another later addition were the four large bronze doors in place at the entrance to the church. Installed in 1965, they were cast in Italy and depict four scenes in the life of the church's patron, St. John Gualbert.

=== Interior ===
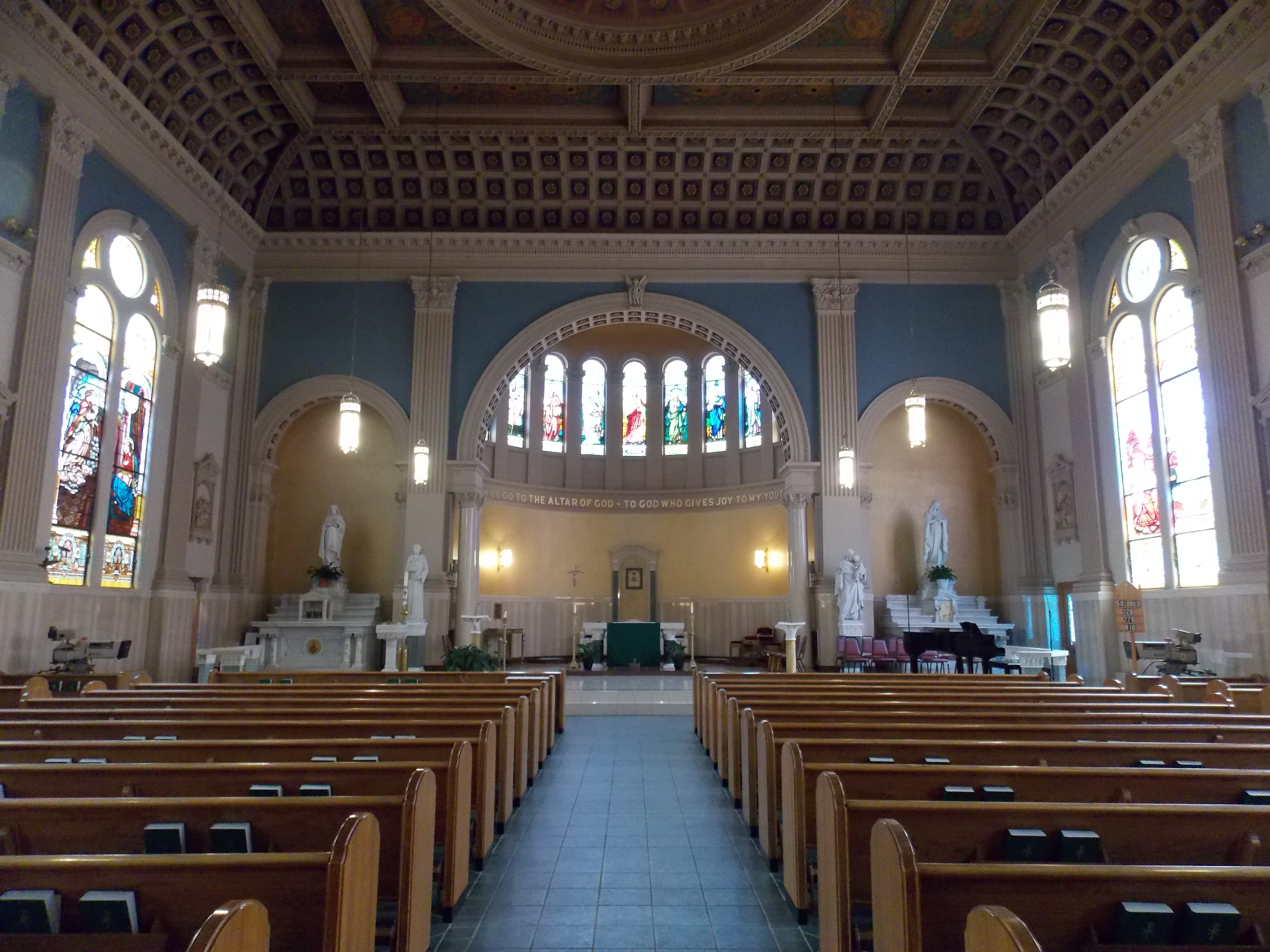
Cathedral interior

The cathedral's interior features round arch windows and pilasters with Corinthian capitals. It is capped with a coved and coffered ceiling. The bishop's cathedra is located at the center of the apse wall.

The church's 1897 pipe organ was donated by Andrew Carnegie through the influence of Charles Schwab. New stops were installed in 1915, and it was electrified and rebuilt in 1922. The organ now consists of 1,929 pipes, having been again rebuilt by Tellers Organ Company of Erie into a three-chambered electro-pneumatic pipe organ in the 1950s. The choir loft also houses the studio and control room used by Proclaim!.

The original high altar and many of the accompanying statues were removed in post-Vatican II renovations and now reside in the crypt of the Cathedral of the Blessed Sacrament in Altoona. The Shrine of Saint Anne, a chapel at the rear of the building that measures 32 by 48 feet (9.8 by 14.6 m), was designed by Comes, Perry, and McMullen, a Pittsburgh architectural firm, and constructed in 1895.

== Ecclesiastical history ==
On November 11, 1957, the Diocese of Altoona was renamed as the Diocese of Altoona-Johnstown, which made St. John Gualbert the co-cathedral of the newly designated diocese.

== Rectors ==
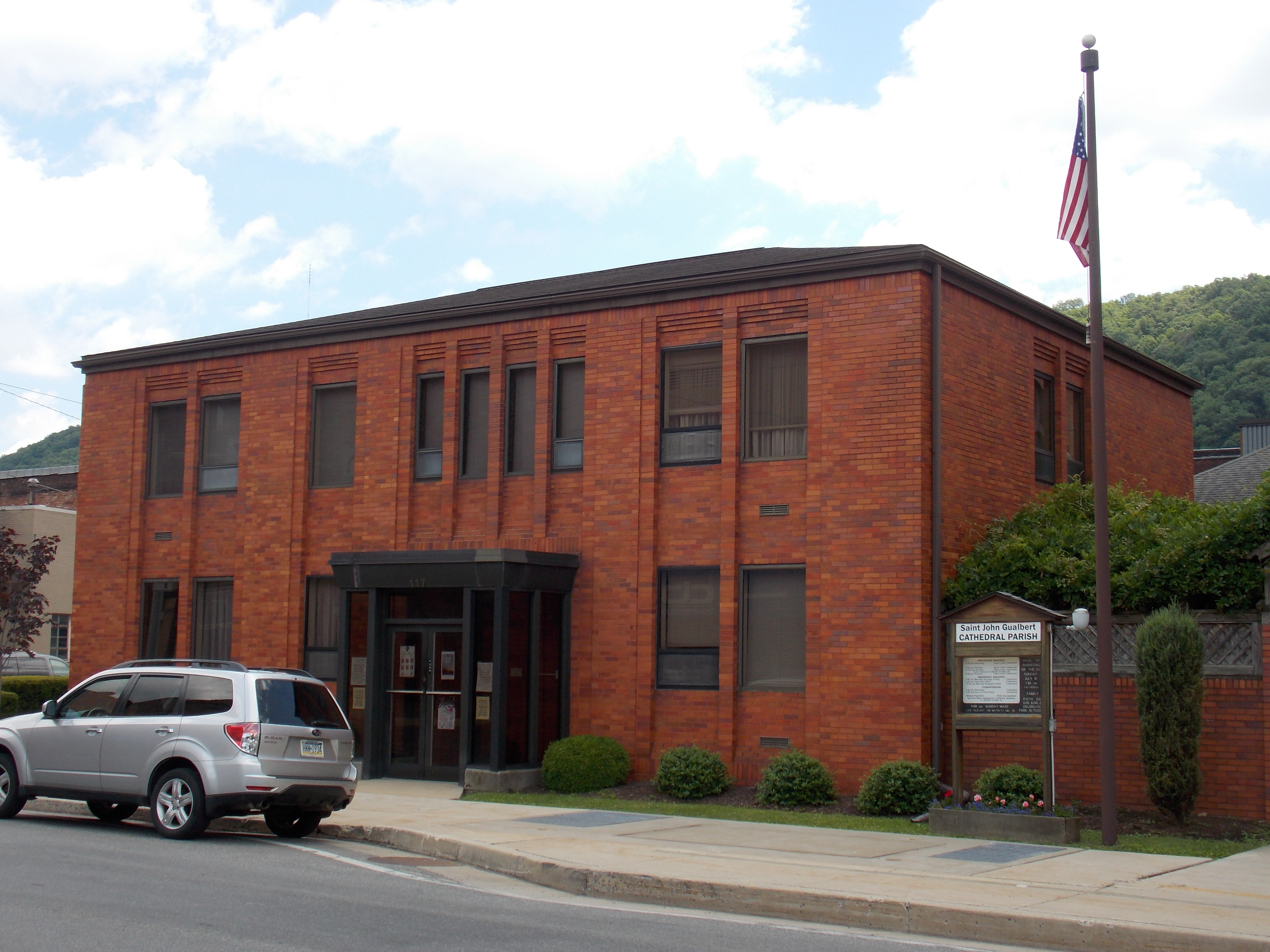
Rectory

The cathedral parish of Saint John Gualbert has had eight rectors since its founding in 1891:

1. Msgr John Boyle, V.G. (1891–1921)
2. Msgr John N. Codori, V.G., LL.D. (1921–1947)
3. Edward B. Daly (1947–1968)
4. Msgr Edwards J. Davis (1968–1987)
5. Msgr Philip P. Saylor (1987–1993)
6. Msgr George B. Flinn, V.G. (1993–2009)
7. Very Rev. James F. Crookston (2009–2021)
8. Very Rev. Matthew Baum (2021–Present)

== See also ==
- Cathedral of the Blessed Sacrament (Altoona, Pennsylvania)
- List of Catholic cathedrals in the United States
- List of cathedrals in the United States
