= Richard Thomas Guilfoyle =

His Excellency, The Most Reverend Richard Thomas Guilfoyle
- Bishop of Altoona
- See: Diocese of Altoona
- In office: 1936 to 1957
- Predecessor: John Joseph McCort
- Successor: Howard Joseph Carroll

Orders
- Ordination: June 2, 1917 by Dennis Joseph Dougherty
- Consecration: November 30, 1937 by John Mark Gannon

Personal details
- Born: December 22, 1892 Punxsutawney, Pennsylvania, US
- Died: June 10, 1957 (aged 64) Altoona, Pennsylvania, US
- Denomination: Roman Catholic
- Education: St. Bonaventure College

Richard Thomas Guilfoyle (December 22, 1892 – June 10, 1957) was an American prelate of the Roman Catholic Church who served as the third bishop of the Diocese of Altoona in Pennsylvania from 1936 to 1957.

== Biography ==
=== Early life ===
Richard Guilfoyle was born near Punxsutawney, Pennsylvania, on December 22. 1892. At age 15, he started working in a coal mine. After deciding to enter the priesthood, he studied at St. Bonaventure College in St. Bonaventure, New York.

=== Priesthood ===
Guilfoyle was ordained to the priesthood for the Diocese of Erie by Bishop Dennis Joseph Dougherty on June 2, 1917, in Buffalo, New York. The diocese then assigned him as a curate at St. Stephen Parish in Oil City, Pennsylvania, until 1921, when he became secretary to Bishop John Gannon. Guilfoyle also served as pastor of St. Peter's Cathedral Parish in Erie, Pennsylvania, and chancellor of the diocese.

=== Bishop of Altoona ===
On August 8, 1936, Guilfoyle was appointed bishop of Altoona by Pope Pius XI. He received his episcopal consecration on November 30, 1936, from Archbishop Gannon at Saint Peter Cathedral in Erie, assisted by Archbishop Thomas Walsh and Bishop Francis Tief.

Guilfoyle died of a heart attack in Altoona on June 10, 1957, at age 64. Bishop Guilfoyle High School in Altoona is named after him.

Catholic Church titles
Preceded by John Joseph McCort	Bishop of Altoona; 1936–1957	Succeeded by Howard Joseph Carroll
