= Diocese of Altoona–Johnstown =

Latin Catholic jurisdiction in the US

Coordinates: 40.45369°N 78.39403°W

Diocese of Altoona-Johnstown Dioecesis Altunensis-Johnstoniensis
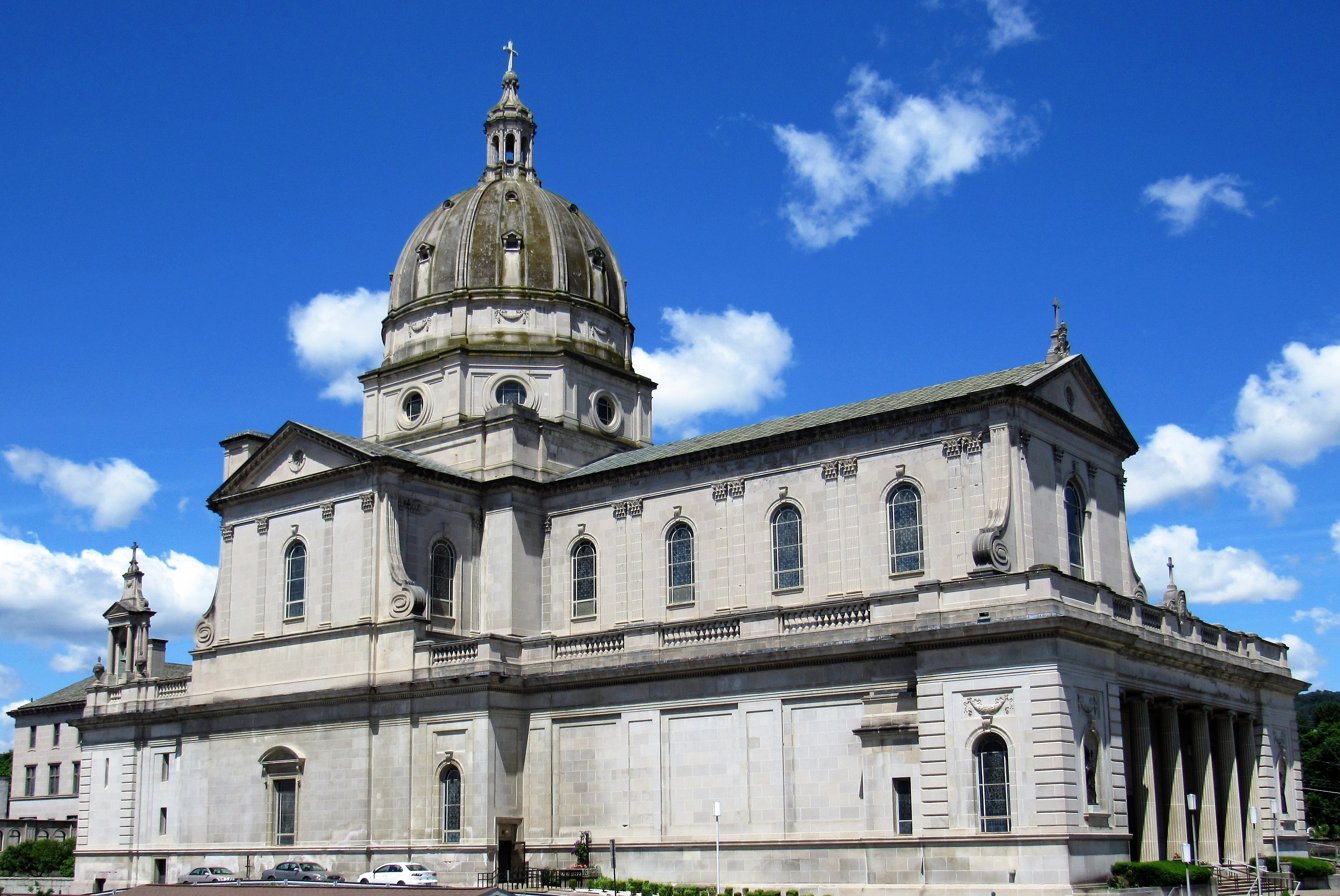
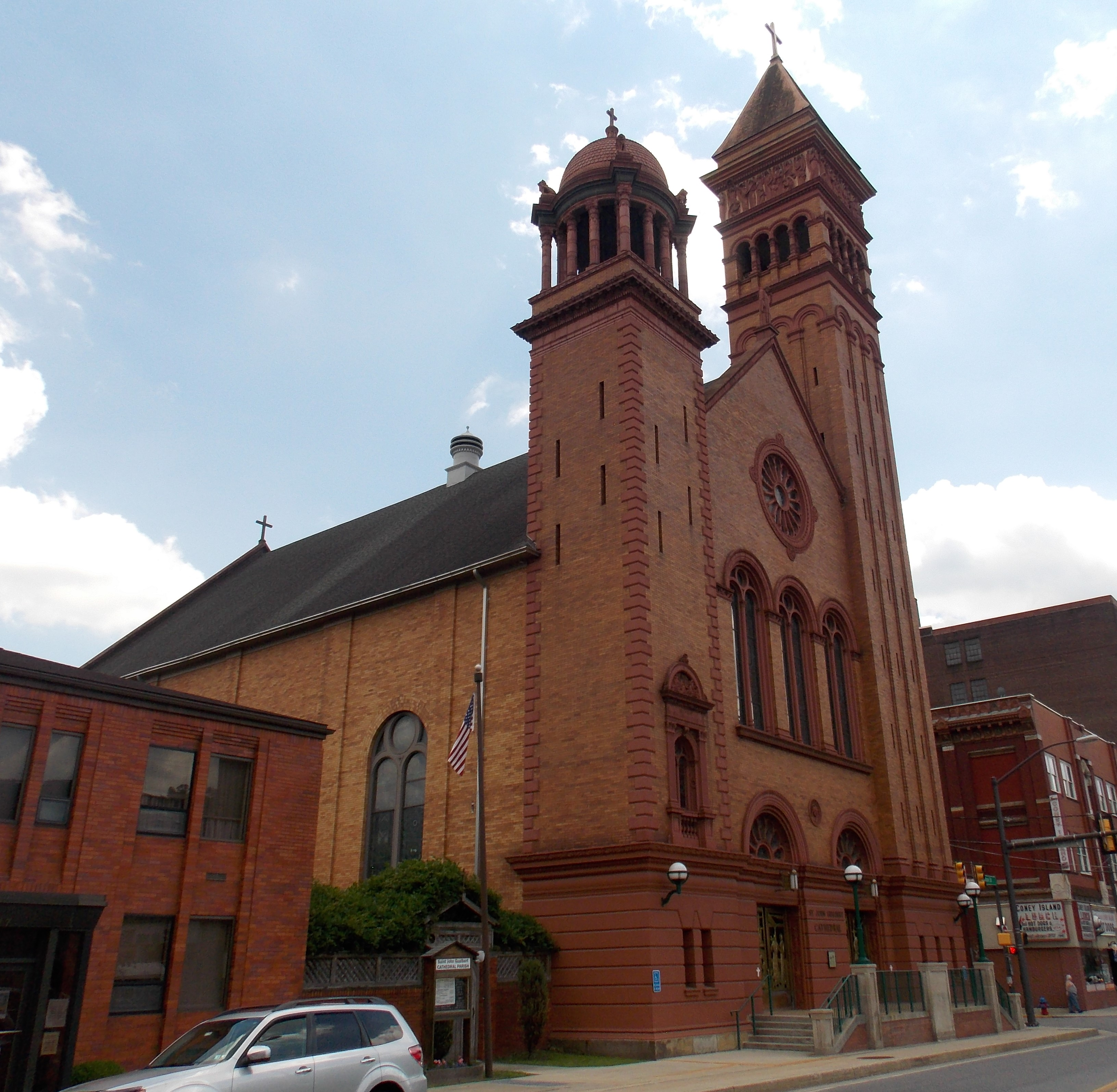
- Cathedral of the Blessed Sacrament St. John Gualbert Cathedral

- Coat of Arms of the Diocese of Altoona-Johnstown

Location
- Country: United States
- Territory: Pennsylvania counties of Bedford, Blair, Cambria, Centre, Clinton, Fulton, Huntingdon and Somerset
- Ecclesiastical province: Philadelphia

Statistics
- Area: 6,674 sq mi (17,290 km^{2})
- Population: Total; Catholics: (as of 2012); 678,000; 109,500 (16.2%)
- Parishes: 88

Information
- Denomination: Catholic
- Sui iuris church: Latin Church
- Rite: Roman Rite
- Established: May 30, 1901 Diocese of Altoona; October 9, 1957 Diocese of Altoona-Johnstown
- Cathedral: Cathedral of the Blessed Sacrament (Altoona)
- Co-cathedral: St. John Gualbert Cathedral (Johnstown)
- Patron saint: Mary, Mother of the Church
- Secular priests: 131

Current leadership
- Pope: Leo XIV
- Bishop: Mark Leonard Bartchak
- Metropolitan Archbishop: Nelson J. Perez

Map
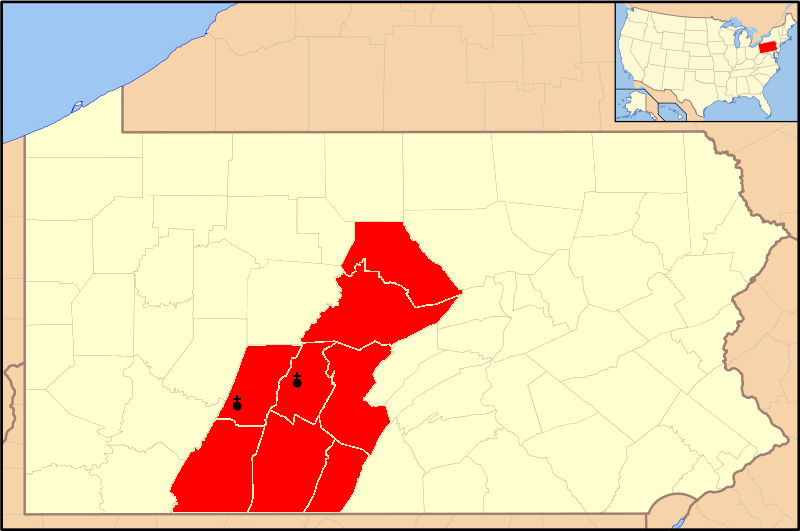

Website
- dioceseaj.org

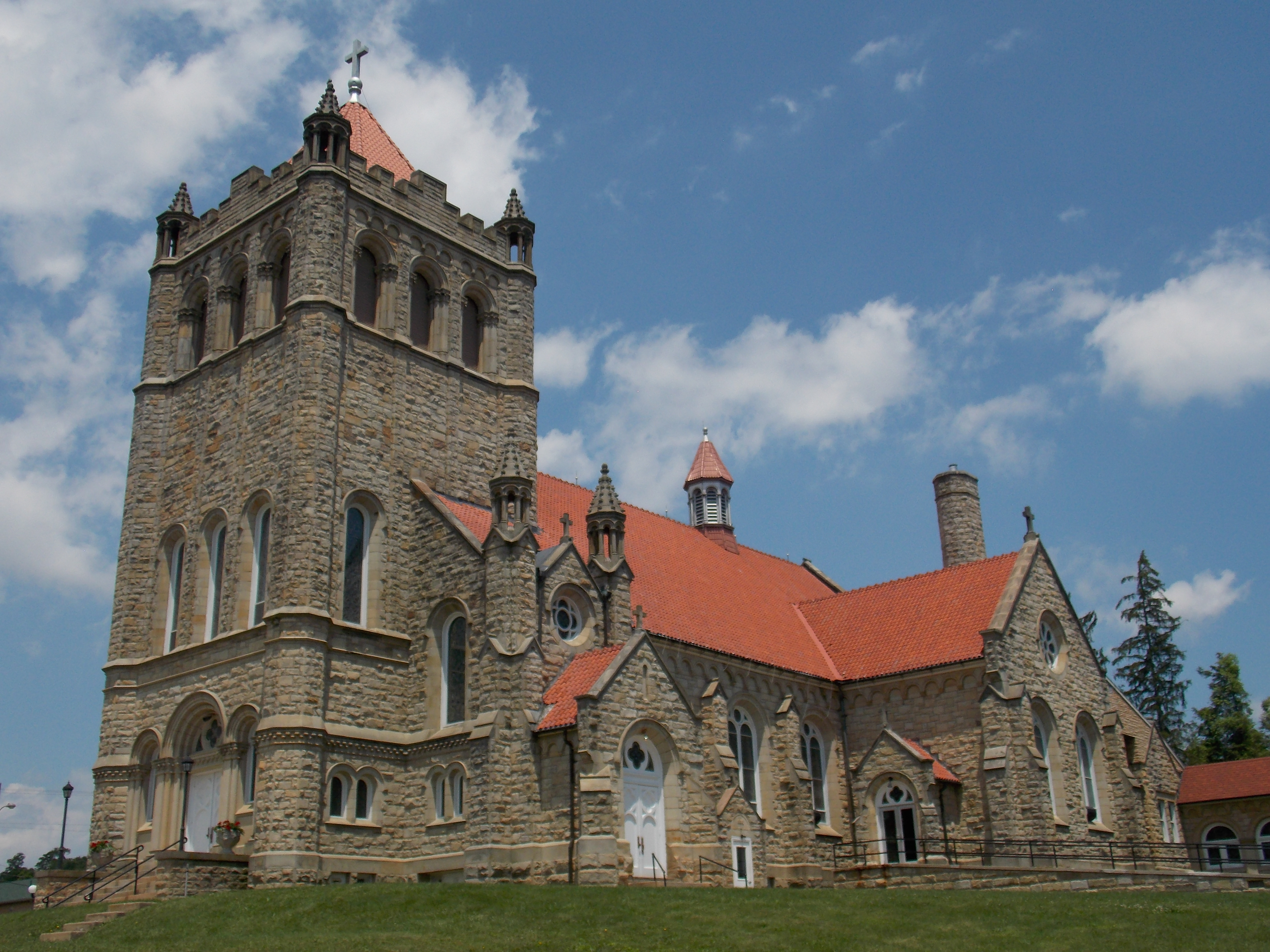
Basilica of St. Michael the Archangel, Loretto, Pennsylvania (2016)

The Diocese of Altoona–Johnstown (Latin: Dioecesis Altunensis-Johnstoniensis) is a diocese of the Catholic Church in central Pennsylvania in the United States. It is a suffragan diocese in the ecclesiastical province of the metropolitan Archdiocese of Philadelphia. The mother church is the Cathedral of the Blessed Sacrament in Altoona. In addition, a co-cathedral, St. John Gualbert Cathedral is seated in Johnstown.

The diocese was established on May 30, 1901, as the Diocese of Altoona. On October 9, 1957, its name was changed to the Diocese of Altoona-Johnstown.

== Territory ==
The Diocese of Altoona-Johnstown consists of Bedford, Blair, Cambria, Centre, Clinton, Fulton, Huntingdon and Somerset Counties. The diocese covers over 6,000 square miles in central and western Pennsylvania.

== History ==
=== 1700 to 1800 ===
Unlike the other British colonies in America, the Province of Pennsylvania did not ban Catholics from the colony or threaten priests with imprisonment.

On November 26, 1784, a year after the end of the American Revolution, Pope Pius VI erected the Apostolic Prefecture of United States of America, including all of the new United States. On November 6, 1789, Pius VI converted the prefecture to the Diocese of Baltimore, covering all of the United States. With the passage of the US Bill of Rights in 1791, Catholics received full freedom of worship.

=== 1800 to 1900 ===
In 1808, the Diocese of Philadelphia, covering the entire new State of Pennsylvania, was erected by Pope Pius VII from the territory of the Diocese of Baltimore.

As the Catholic population grew in Pennsylvania in the 19th century, the Vatican erected the Diocese of Pittsburgh in 1843. The first Catholic church in Altoona, St. John the Evangelist, was dedicated in 1851. St. Benedict in Carrolltown was consecrated in 1850. Pope Pius IX erected the Diocese of Harrisburg in 1868.

In 1899, in the face of rapid growth of the Catholic population of western Pennsylvania, Bishop Richard Phelan of Pittsburgh and Archbishop Patrick John Ryan of Philadelphia asked the Vatican to create a new diocese in the region. Two years later, the Vatican agreed to it.

=== 1900 to 1936 ===
The Diocese of Altoona was erected on May 30, 1901, by Pope Leo XIII, with counties taken from the Dioceses of Pittsburgh and Harrisburg. The pope named Monsignor Eugene A. Garvey from the Diocese of Scranton as the first bishop of the new diocese.

In Garvey's first full year as bishop in 1902, the new diocese contained 59 priests, 44 parishes, 23 parochial schools with 6,000 students, and a Catholic population of 44,000. By his final year as bishop in 1920, there were 148 priests, 91 parishes, 42 parochial schools with 11,369 students, and a Catholic population of 123,756. In early 1920, Pope Pius XI appointed Auxiliary Bishop John Joseph McCort from the Archdiocese of Philadelphia as coadjutor bishop to assist Garvey.

When Garvey died later in 1920, McCort succeeded him. He laid the cornerstone for the new Cathedral of the Blessed Sacrament in May 1926, though construction temporarily came to a halt in 1929 due to the stock market crash. The cathedral was dedicated in September 1931. In 1922, McCort established Altoona Catholic High School (now Bishop Guilfoyle High School) and Johnstown Catholic High School (renamed Bishop McCort High School in 1962).

=== 1936 to 1986 ===
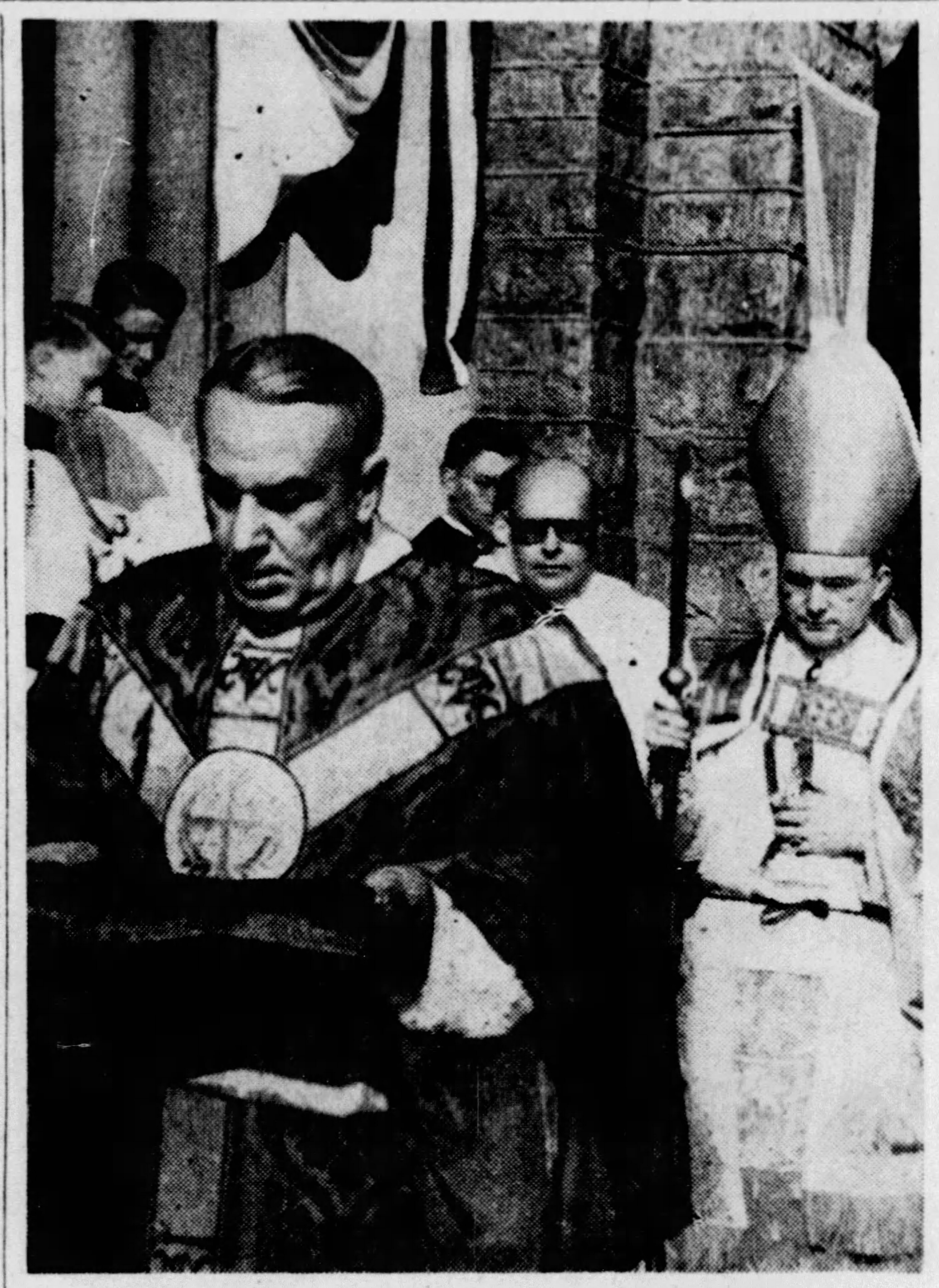
Bishop McCormick (1948)

By the time of McCort's death in 1936, the Diocese of Altoona had 197 priests, 129 churches, 111 parishes, 50 parochial schools, and a Catholic population that had fallen to 100,634 during the Great Depression. Pius XI replaced McCort with Richard Guilfoyle from the Diocese of Erie in 1936. Guilfoyle died in 1957.

Pope Pius XII in 1957 renamed the Diocese of Altoona to the Diocese of Altoona-Johnstown to reflect the population growth of Johnstown. In December 1957, the pope appointed Monsignor Howard Joseph Carroll of Pittsburgh as the next bishop of Altoona-Johnstown. Carroll died in 1960.

Pope John XXIII in 1960 appointed Auxiliary Bishop J. Carroll McCormick of Philadelphia as the next bishop of Altoona-Johnstown. In 1966, McCormick became bishop of the Diocese of Scranton. His replacement in Altoona-Johnstown was Auxiliary Bishop James John Hogan of the Diocese of Trenton, selected by Pope Paul VI in 1966.

=== 1986 to present ===
After 20 years as bishop, Hogan retired in 1986. His replacement was Monsignor Joseph Victor Adamec from the Diocese of Saginaw, named by Pope John Paul II in 1987. Adamec retired in 2011.

In 1988, a man sued the Diocese of Altoona-Johnstown and Bishop Hogan, stating that he had been sexually abused by Francis Luddy. The plaintiff, Luddy's godson, said that the abuse occurred in 1984 when he was 11 years old. After six years of legal delays, the trial started in February 1994. In April 1994, a jury found Hogan and the diocese liable for Luddy's actions, saying that they "knew that [Luddy] had a propensity for pedophilic behavior." The jury awarded the plaintiff $1.2 million.

In April 2013, the diocese and the Third Order Regular Franciscans were sued by several former students at Bishop McCort High School, who stated that they had been sexually abused by TOR Brother Stephen Baker during the 1990s and early 2000s. The plaintiffs said that Baker, then a McCort teacher and a self-professed athletic trainer, sexually abused the boys while giving them athletic massages. TOR was aware of earlier accusations against Baker during his assignments in Minnesota, Michigan and Ohio and that some financial settlements had been paid to his victims. TOR permanently removed Baker from ministry in 2000; he committed suicide in January 2013.

In September 2014, American authorities charged Joseph D. Maurizo Jr., a priest in Our Lady Queen of Angels Parish in Somerset County, with possession of child pornography and abusing minors at an orphanage in Honduras. In September 2015, Maurizo was convicted on sex abuse, possession of child pornography, and illegally transferring money to Honduras to pay his victims. In March 2016, Maurizo received a 17-year prison sentence. His sentence was upheld in 2017.

In 2016, a Pennsylvania grand jury reported that at least 50 priests and others associated with the diocese had abused hundreds of children across nearly half a century, and that diocesan leadership actively concealed the abuse. Most of the crimes happened between the 1940s and 1980s, but many of the victims came forward in more recent decades. The report stated that Bishops Hogan and Adamec were primarily to blame for the decades of concealment. Those bishops "took actions that further endangered children as they placed their desire to avoid public scandal over the well-being of innocent children ... Priests were returned to ministry with full knowledge they were child predators."

In his grand jury testimony, Bishop Bartchak acknowledged that the diocese transferred dozens of priests accused of child abuse to small town parishes between the 1950s and 1990s. Bartchak also acknowledged that Adamec had created a system to supply compensation to sexual abuse victims to ensure their silence. The Pennsylvania Attorney General was unable to pursue criminal charges in many cases because the statute of limitations had elapsed.

Many of those listed by the diocese as priests with credible accusations of sexual abuse of minors are now deceased. In August 2019, the Pennsylvania Superior Court denied the diocese's motion to dismiss a lawsuit filed by a woman who said a priest consistently molested her in the 1970s and 1980s in Blair County. In February 2020, the diocese was hit with additional new lawsuits.

As of 2023, the bishop of the Diocese of Altoona-Johnstown is Mark Bartchak, formerly bishop of the Diocese of Erie. He was appointed by Pope Benedict XVI in 2011.

== Bishops ==
=== Bishops of Altoona ===
1. Eugene A. Garvey (1901-1920)
2. John Joseph McCort (1920-1936; coadjutor 1920)
3. Richard Thomas Guilfoyle (1936-1957)

=== Bishops of Altoona-Johnstown ===
1. Howard Joseph Carroll (1957-1960)
2. Joseph Carroll McCormick (1960-1966), appointed Bishop of Scranton
3. James John Hogan (1966-1986)
4. Joseph Victor Adamec (1987-2011)
5. Mark Leonard Bartchak (2011–present)

== Schools ==
=== High schools ===
As of 2025, the Diocese of Altoona-Johnstown operates four high schools.

- Bishop Carroll Catholic High School – Ebensburg
- Bishop Guilfoyle Academy – Altoona
- Bishop McCort Catholic High School – Johnstown
- Saint Joseph's Catholic Academy – Boalsburg
