= Mark Bartchak =

Catholic bishop

His Excellency, The Most Reverend Mark Leonard Bartchak
- Bishop of Altoona-Johnstown
- Church: Roman Catholic
- Archdiocese: Philadelphia
- Diocese: Altoona-Johnstown
- Appointed: January 14, 2011
- Installed: April 19, 2011
- Predecessor: Joseph Victor Adamec

Orders
- Ordination: May 15, 1981 by Michael Joseph Murphy
- Consecration: April 19, 2011 by Justin Francis Rigali, Donald Walter Trautman, and Joseph Victor Adamec

Personal details
- Born: January 1, 1955 (age 71) Cleveland, Ohio
- Education: Gannon University; Christ the King Seminary; Catholic University of America
- Motto: Christ our hope of glory

Styles of Mark Leonard Bartchak
- Reference style: His Excellency; The Most Reverend
- Spoken style: Your Excellency
- Religious style: Bishop

Mark Leonard Bartchak (born January 1, 1955) is an American Catholic prelate who has served as bishop of Altoona-Johnstown in Pennsylvania since 2011.

Bartchak has also served on the Supreme Tribunal of the Apostolic Signatura, the highest court of the Vatican, since 2021 and is considered an authority on canon law.

== Biography ==
=== Early life and education ===
Mark Bartchak was born on January 1, 1955, in Cleveland, Ohio, the fifth of eight children of Leonard Bartchak and Rosemary (nee: Beck) Bartchak-Shay. He attended Catholic elementary and secondary schools, graduating in 1973 from Bradford Central Christian High School in Bradford, Pennsylvania.

After graduating from high school, Bartchak decided to become a priest. He entered St. Mark Seminary in Erie, Pennsylvania, and started his studies at Gannon University, also in Erie. He received a Bachelor of Arts in philosophy from Gannon in 1977. Bartchak continued his preparation for the priesthood at Christ the King Seminary in East Aurora, New York, receiving a Master of Arts in theology in 1981.

Bartchak was ordained as a transitional deacon at Christ the King Seminary on September 22, 1980, and was assigned to serve at St. Joseph Parish in Warren, Pennsylvania.

=== Ordination and ministry ===
Bartchak was ordained a priest for the Diocese of Erie on May 15, 1981, by Bishop Michael J. Murphy at St. Peter Cathedral in Erie. After his ordination, the diocese assigned Bartchak as temporary parochial vicar at St. Joseph Parish. In August 1981, he was named parochial vicar at St. Francis Parish in Clearfield, Pennsylvania. During this period also served as assistant principal and theology teacher at St. Francis School in Clearfield and as part-time chaplain at the Clearfield Hospital.

The diocese then transferred Bartchak to St. Leo Magnus Parish in Ridgway, Pennsylvania, to serve as the temporary parish administrator. He was later appointed parochial vicar of the parish. Bartchak also visited patients at the Elk County General Hospital in St. Marys, Pennsylvania, and inmates at the Elk County Prison in Ridgway, Pennsylvania.

In 1982, Bishop Michael Murphy appointed Bartchak as part-time defender of the bond for the diocese and in 1986 assigned him full-time to the diocesan tribunal. Bartchak then went to Washington, D.C. to attend the Catholic University of America School of Canon Law, where he received a Licentiate of Canon Law in 1989. During his time in Washington, Bartchak assisted as a confessor at the Basilica of the National Shrine of the Immaculate Conception and at the U.S. Naval Academy in Annapolis, Maryland.

In August 1991, Bartchak requested that the diocese allow him to reside at St. Stanislaus Parish, where he provided weekend pastoral assistance. He received a Doctor of Canon Law degree from Catholic University in 1992. That same year, Bartchak was appointed by Bishop Donald Trautman as judicial vicar and director of the Office of Conciliation & Arbitration of the diocese. In 2000, Pope John Paul II named Bartchak as chaplain to his holiness.

In addition to these duties, Trautman named Bartchak as vicar for canonical affairs in 2004. Bartchak also served as an ex-officio member of the presbyteral council, the administrative cabinet and various diocesan committees. He served on the planning committee for the establishment of the permanent diaconate formation program for the diocese.

In 2004, Bartchak was appointed to the administrative board and the executive committee of the Pennsylvania Catholic Conference. In 2007, he was appointed as a consultant for the US Conference of Catholic Bishops (USCCB) Committee on Canonical Affairs and Church Governance.

While in Erie, Bartchak gave seminars and workshops on canon law for civil attorneys of the Erie County Bar Association and for students in the permanent diaconate program.

==== Handling of sexual abuse in Diocese of Erie ====
A grand jury report published by Pennsylvania Attorney General Josh Shapiro in August 2018 criticized Bartchak for his investigation of Reverend William Presley, a priest in the Diocese of Erie. The Vatican in 2005 had assigned Bartchak, then a member of the diocesan tribunal, to investigate allegations of sexual abuse against minors by Presley. As part of his investigation, Bartchak re-interviewed a man who had sent accusations about Presley to the diocese in 1982, 1987 and 2002.

On August 25, 2005, Bartchak sent a secret memo about Presley to Trautman. Parts of the memo read:

"I was not surprised to learn from other witnesses from the Elk County area that there are likely to be other victims" ..."it is likely that there may be others who were also of the age for the offenses to be considered delicts, but to what end is it necessary to follow every lead?" ... "[It was] not likely that they will lead to information concerning delicts involving minors under 16 years of age." He then asked Trautman: “Is it worth the further harm and scandal that might occur if this is all brought up again? I am asking you how you want me to proceed. With due regard for the potential for more harm to individuals and for more scandal, should I continue to follow up on potential leads?”

=== Bishop of Altoona-Johnstown ===
On January 14, 2011, Bartchak was appointed by Pope Benedict XVI as bishop of Altoona-Johnstown; Bartchak was consecrated bishop at the Cathedral of the Blessed Sacrament in Altoona, Pennsylvania, by Cardinal Justin Rigali on April 19, 2011. In December 2018, Bartchak said that the diocese had paid $21.5 million in settlements to victims of sexual abuse by its clergy. He stated:

I apologize to all who have suffered from sexual abuse, especially perpetrated by some members of the clergy. I apologize to your families and loved ones. I apologize to all who feel shock, disgust, anger, confusion, disappointment, and betrayal.

Pope Francis named Bartchak a member of the Supreme Tribunal of the Apostolic Signatura in June 2021. Bartchak has lectured on canon law at Catholic University of America, the John Paul II Catholic University of Lublin in Lublin, Poland, and Saint Paul University in Ottawa, Ontario. He teaches at the Institute on Matrimonial Tribunal Practice, held each summer at Catholic University.

== See also ==
- Catholic Church hierarchy
- Catholic Church in the United States
- Historical list of the Catholic bishops of the United States
- List of Catholic bishops of the United States
- Lists of patriarchs, archbishops, and bishops

== Episcopal succession ==
Catholic Church titles
Preceded by Joseph Victor Adamec	Bishop of Altoona-Johnstown; 19 April 2011–present	Incumbent
