= Howard Joseph Carroll =

American Prelate

His Excellency, The Most Reverend Howard Joseph Carroll
- Bishop of Altoona-Johnstown
- See: Diocese of Altoona-Johnstown
- In office: 1958-1960
- Predecessor: Richard Thomas Guilfoyle
- Successor: Joseph Carroll McCormick

Orders
- Ordination: April 2, 1927 by Marius Besson
- Consecration: January 2, 1958 by Amleto Giovanni Cicognani

Personal details
- Born: August 5, 1902 Pittsburgh, Pennsylvania, US
- Died: March 21, 1960 (aged 57) Washington, D.C., US
- Denomination: Roman Catholic
- Education: Duquesne University; St. Vincent College; University of Fribourg

Howard Joseph Carroll (August 5, 1902 – March 21, 1960) was an American prelate of the Roman Catholic Church who served as the fourth bishop of the Diocese of Altoona-Johnstown in Pennsylvania from 1958 to 1960.

== Biography ==
=== Early life ===
Howard Carroll was born on August 5, 1902, in Pittsburgh, Pennsylvania. He attended Duquesne University in Pittsburgh from 1920 to 1921. He then studied at St. Vincent College in Latrobe, Pennsylvania, where he obtained a Bachelor of Arts degree and a Licentiate of Philosophy. In 1923, Carroll entered the University of Fribourg in Fribourg, Switzerland, earning a Doctor of Sacred Theology degree in 1928.

=== Priesthood ===
Carroll was ordained to the priesthood by Bishop Marius Besson in Fribourg for the Diocese of Pittsburgh on April 2, 1927. Following his return to Pennsylvania in 1928, the diocese assigned Carroll as a curate at Sacred Heart Parish in Pittsburgh. In 1938, he was named assistant general-secretary of the National Catholic Welfare Council (NCWC) in Washington, D.C. The Vatican named Carroll as a papal chamberlain in 1942 and a domestic prelate in 1945. He served as general-secretary of NCWC from 1944 to 1957.

=== Bishop of Altoona ===
On December 5, 1957, Carroll was appointed bishop of Altoona-Johnstown by Pope Pius XII. He received his episcopal consecration at St. Matthew Cathedral in Washington on January 2, 1958, from Archbishop Amleto Cicognani, assisted by Bishops John Dearden and Coleman Carroll (his brother).

Howard Carroll died in Washington on March 21, 1960, at age 57.

Catholic Church titles
Preceded by Richard Thomas Guilfoyle	Bishop of Altoona; 1958–1960	Succeeded by Joseph Carroll McCormick
