= J. Carroll McCormick =

American prelate

His Excellency, The Most Reverend Joseph Carroll McCormick
- Bishop of Scranton; Titular Bishop of Ruspae
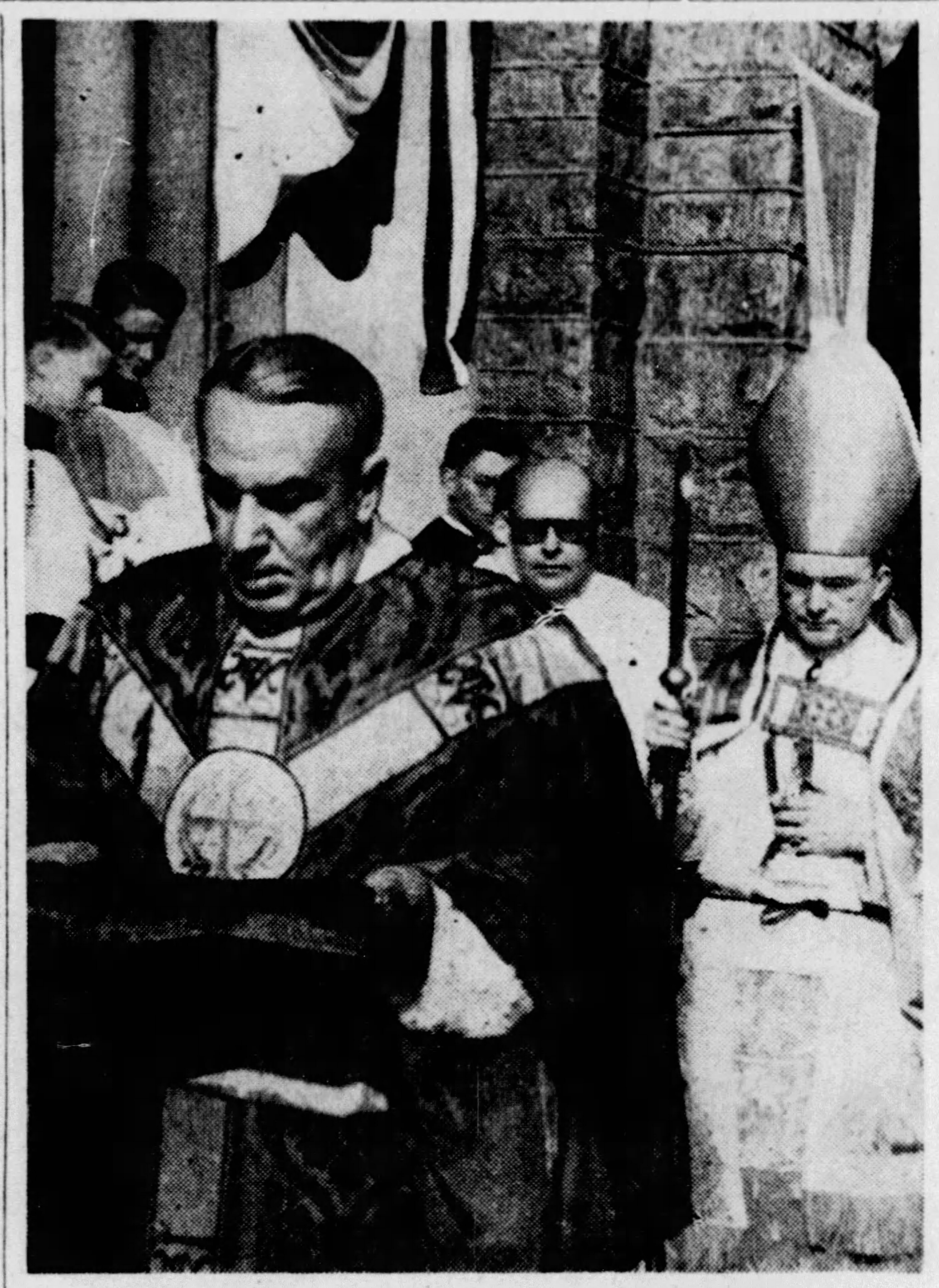
- Bishop McCormick (wearing mitre) celebrating Golden Jubilee of Saint Philomena's Church (May 2, 1948)
- See: Diocese of Scranton
- In office: 1966-1983
- Predecessor: Jerome Daniel Hannan
- Successor: John Joseph O'Connor
- Previous posts: Auxiliary Bishop of Philadelphia; Bishop of Altoona-Johnstown

Orders
- Ordination: July 10, 1932 by Dennis Joseph Dougherty
- Consecration: April 23, 1948 by Dennis Joseph Dougherty

Personal details
- Born: December 15, 1907 Philadelphia, Pennsylvania, US
- Died: November 2, 1996 (aged 89) Scranton, Pennsylvania, US
- Denomination: Roman Catholic
- Education: St. Charles Borromeo Seminary; Pontifical Roman Seminary
- Motto: Super omnia Deus (God over all things)

Joseph Carroll McCormick (December 15, 1907 – November 2, 1996) was an American prelate of the Roman Catholic Church. He served as an auxiliary bishop of the Archdiocese of Philadelphia in Pennsylvania (1947–1960), as bishop of the Diocese of Altoona-Johnstown in Pennsylvania (1960–1966) and bishop of the Diocese of Scranton in Pennsylvania (1966–1983).

In a 2018 Pennsylvania grand jury report, McCormick was criticized for his mishandling of sexual abuse allegations against priests when he was bishop of Scranton.

== Biography ==
=== Early life ===
Carroll McCormick was born in Philadelphia, Pennsylvania, on December 15, 1907. He studied at St. Charles Borromeo Seminary in Philadelphia and at the Pontifical Roman Major Seminary in Rome.

=== Priesthood ===
McCormick was ordained to the priesthood for the Archdiocese of Philadelphia by his uncle, Cardinal Dennis Dougherty, in Philadelphia on July 10, 1932. McCormick later served as vice-chancellor of the archdiocese and was appointed chancellor in 1936. On June 24, 1940, McCormick gave the benediction at the second session of the 1940 Republican National Convention in Philadelphia. He was appointed pastor of St. Stephen's Parish in Philadelphia in 1944.

=== Auxiliary Bishop of Philadelphia ===
On January 11, 1947, McCormick was appointed as an auxiliary bishop of Philadelphia and titular bishop of Ruspe by Pope Pius XII. He received his episcopal consecration on April 23, 1947, from Dougherty at the Cathedral of Saints Peter and Paul in Philadelphia. Bishops Hugh L. Lamb and Eugene J. McGuinness served as co-consecrators.

=== Bishop of Altoona-Johnstown ===
McCormick was named bishop of Altoona-Johnstown on June 25, 1960, by Pope John XXIII. During his tenure in the diocese, McCormick attended the Second Vatican Council in Rome from 1962 to 1965.

=== Bishop of Scranton ===
McCormick was appointed bishop of Scranton by Paul VI on March 4, 1966.

=== Retirement and legacy ===
On February 15, 1983, Pope John Paul II accepted McCormick's letter of resignation as Bishop of Scranton. He died in Scranton on November 2, 1996, at age 89

In 2018, a grand jury investigating the handling of sexual abuse cases in Pennsylvania by the Catholic Church was released. The report described several instances in the Diocese of Scranton in which parents, a police officer and other clergy reported sexual assault or inappropriate behaviors by priests to the diocese. McCormick never notified parishioners or authorities about these allegations, but either dismissed them or reassigned the offending priests to different parishes.

On August 21, 2018, King's College in Wilkes-Barre, Pennsylvania, announced that they were removing McCormick's name from the building housing the chapel and the campus ministry. This was in reaction to revelations that McCormick had protected priests accused of sexually abusing children. The University of Scranton also announced that it was renaming its McCormick Hall due to the same reasons as King's College.

Catholic Church titles
Preceded by –	Auxiliary Bishop of Philadelphia; 1947–1960	Succeeded by –
Preceded by Howard Joseph Carroll	Bishop of Altoona-Johnstown; 1960–1966	Succeeded by James John Hogan
Preceded by Jerome Daniel Hannan	Bishop of Scranton; 1966–1983	Succeeded by John Joseph O'Connor
