= Saint Joseph's Catholic Academy (Boalsburg, Pennsylvania) =

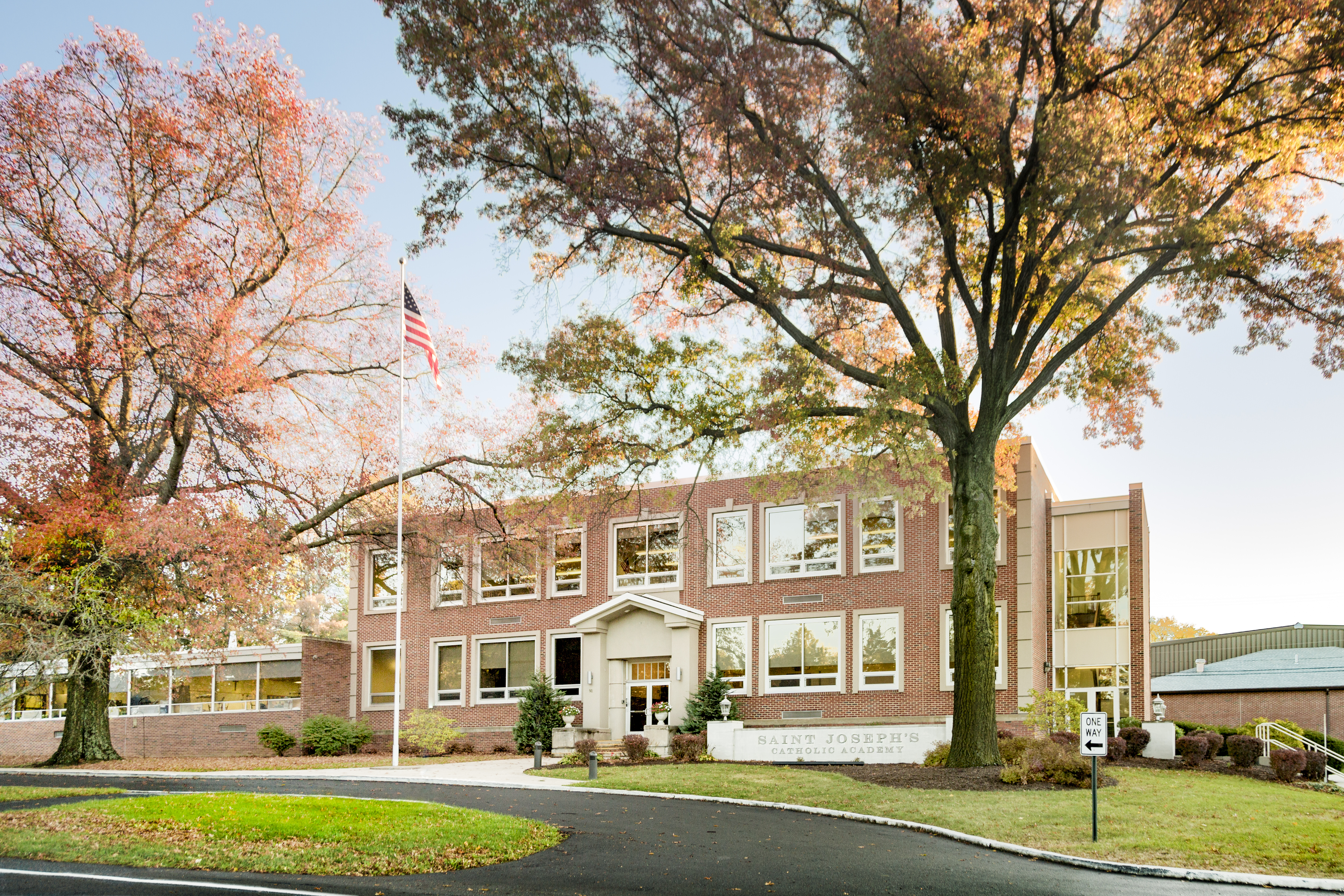

Location
- 901 Boalsburg Pike; Boalsburg, (Centre County), Pennsylvania 16827; United States
- 40°47′9″N 77°47′40″W

Information
- Type: Private, Coeducational
- Religious affiliation: Roman Catholic
- Established: 2011
- School district: State College Area School District
- Head of school
- Chaplain: Fr. Michael Pleva
- Grades: 9-12
- Campus type: Suburban
- Colors: Blue and Orange
- Athletics: Baseball, Basketball, Cross Country, Football (Suspended), Golf, Indoor Track, Soccer, Softball, Track & Field, Volleyball, Wrestling
- Athletics conference: Tri-Valley Athletic Association
- Mascot: Wolfpack
- Accreditation: Middle States Association of Colleges and Schools
- Tuition: $6,500
- Website: stjoeacad.org

Saint Joseph's Catholic Academy is a Catholic high school located in Boalsburg, Pennsylvania, near State College. It is located in the Roman Catholic Diocese of Altoona-Johnstown.

== Background ==
Saint Joseph's Catholic Academy, also abbreviated as SJCA, was founded in 2011 to serve students in the State College area. It graduated its first senior class in 2014.

== Athletics ==
Saint Joseph's Catholic Academy had a PIAA District 6, Class A football team. As of July 2018, this football team was suspended.

St. Joseph's currently has a variety of sports teams: soccer, basketball, indoor and outdoor track and field, volleyball, golf, cross country, and baseball. SJCA competes in PIAA District 6 Class A, with the exception of track and field, which competes in class AA. Starting in the 2022–2023 school year, they will join the Tri-Valley Athletic Association.

The St. Joseph's girls cross country team has won the Class A PIAA State Cross Country Championship three times: in 2016, 2017, and 2019. Their boys' soccer team won the District 6 A Championship in 2021.
