= James John Hogan =

Catholic bishop (1911–2005)

His Excellency, The Most Reverend James John Hogan
- Bishop of Altoona-Johnstown; Titular Bishop of Philomelium
- See: Diocese of Altoona-Johnstown
- In office: 1966 to 1986
- Predecessor: J. Carroll McCormick
- Successor: Joseph Victor Adamec
- Previous post: Auxiliary Bishop of Trenton (1959 to 1966)

Orders
- Ordination: December 8, 1937 by Ralph Leo Hayes
- Consecration: February 25, 1960 by Bishop George W. Ahr

Personal details
- Born: October 17, 1911 Philadelphia, Pennsylvania, US
- Died: June 14, 2005 (aged 93) Hollidaysburg, Pennsylvania, US
- Denomination: Roman Catholic
- Education: Camden Catholic High School; St. Charles College; St. Mary's Seminary; Pontifical North American College
- Motto: Sacrificium meum pergratum fiat (May my sacrifice be greatly appreciated)

James John Hogan (October 17, 1911 – June 14, 2005) was an American prelate of the Roman Catholic Church who served as the sixth bishop of the Diocese of Altoona-Johnstown in Pennsylvania (1966–1986). He previously served as an auxiliary bishop of the Diocese of Trenton in New Jersey (1959–1966).

== Biography ==
=== Early life ===
James Hogan was born on October 17, 1911, in Philadelphia, Pennsylvania,. The family move to Camden, New Jersey, when was a child. After graduating from Camden Catholic High School in Cherry Hill, New Jersey, Hogan studied at St. Charles College in Catonsville, Maryland. Deciding to become a priest, Hogan entered St. Mary's Seminary in Baltimore, Maryland. He continued his studies in Rome, residing at the Pontifical North American College.

=== Priesthood ===
While in Rome, Hogan was ordained to the priesthood for the Diocese of Trenton by Bishop Ralph Leo Hayes on December 8, 1937.

=== Auxiliary Bishop of Trenton ===
On November 27, 1959, Hogan was appointed as an auxiliary bishop of Trenton and titular bishop of Philomelium by Pope John XXIII. He received his episcopal consecration on February 25, 1960, from Bishop George W. Ahr, with Bishops James A. McNulty and James Griffiths serving as co-consecrators.

=== Bishop of Altoona-Johnstown ===
Hogan was named bishop of Altoona-Johnstown by Pope Paul VI on May 23, 1966; he was installed on July 6, 1966.

=== Retirement and legacy ===
On October 17, 1986, Pope John Paul II accepted Hogan's resignation as bishop of Altoona-Johnstown.

In 1994, Hogan was found liable for the actions of Reverend Francis Luddy. The jury found that the diocese and Hogan "knew that (Luddy) had a propensity for pedophilic behavior." Evidence and testimony are amply demonstrated. The diocese and Hogan were "negligent in retaining him (Luddy) and his activities." The diocese paid $1.2 million in damages.

James Hogan died on June 14, 2005, at Garvey Manor Nursing Home in Hollidaysburg, Pennsylvania, at age 93.

On March 1, 2016, Pennsylvania Attorney General Kathleen Kane announced that as bishop, Hogan was at the forefront of a major cover-up scandal involving the sexual assault of hundreds of children by diocese priests.

Catholic Church titles
Preceded by –	Auxiliary Bishop of Trenton; 1960–1966	Succeeded by –
Preceded by J. Carroll McCormick	Bishop of Altoona-Johnstown; 1966–1986	Succeeded by Joseph Victor Adamec
