= Dennis Joseph Dougherty =

American Catholic prelate (1865–1951)

His Eminence Dennis Joseph Dougherty
- Cardinal, Archbishop of Philadelphia
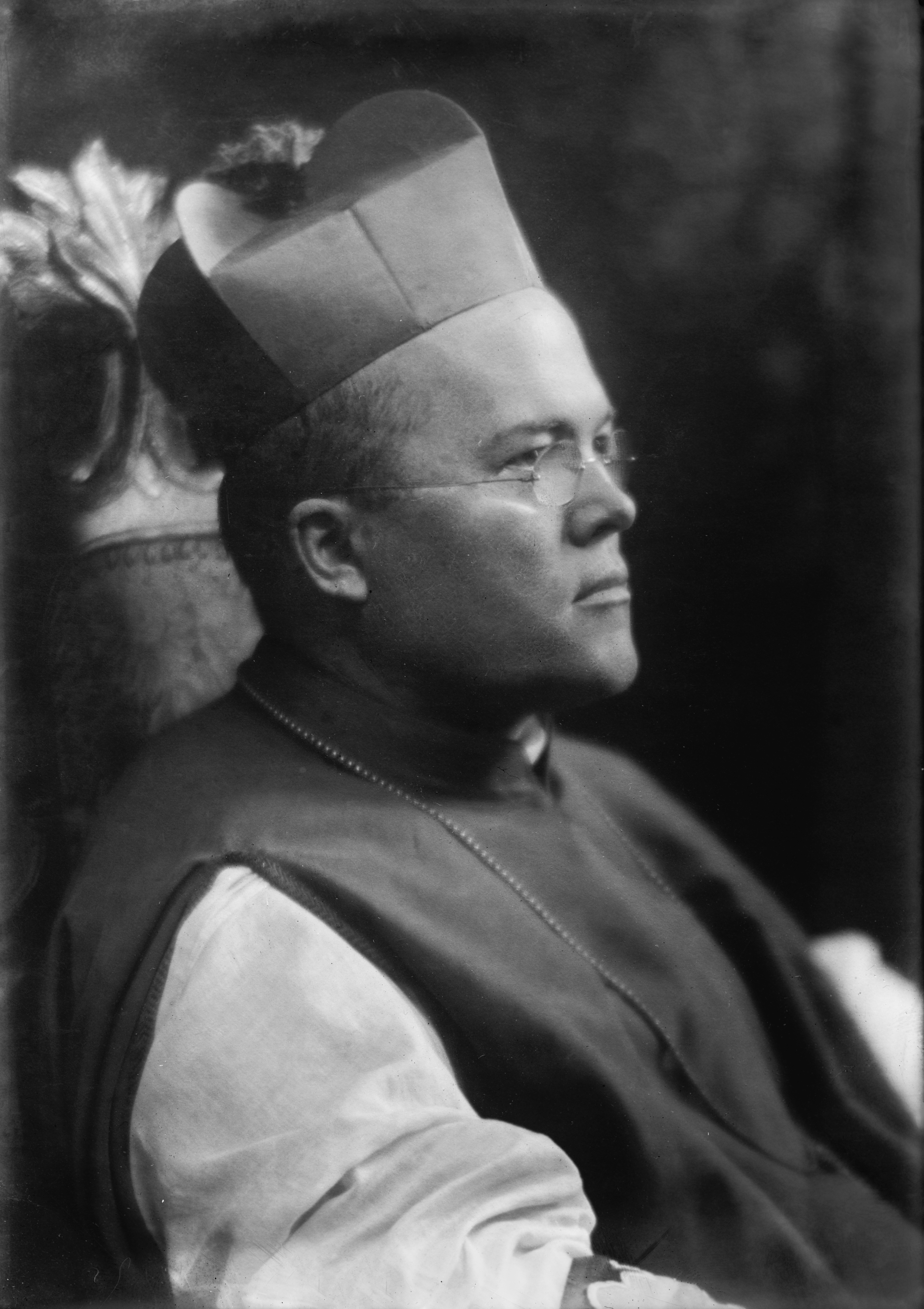
- Dougherty, c. 1918
- Church: Catholic Church; Latin Church
- Archdiocese: Philadelphia
- Appointed: May 1, 1918
- Term ended: May 31, 1951 (his death)
- Predecessor: Edmond Francis Prendergast
- Successor: John Francis O'Hara
- Previous posts: Bishop of Buffalo (1915‍–‍1918); Bishop of Jaro (1908‍–‍1915); Bishop of Nueva Segovia (1903‍–‍1908)

Orders
- Ordination: May 31, 1890 by Lucido Parocchi
- Consecration: June 14, 1903 by Francesco Satolli
- Created cardinal: March 7, 1921 by Pope Benedict XV
- Rank: Cardinal-Priest of Santi Nereo e Achilleo

Personal details
- Born: August 16, 1865 Butler, Pennsylvania, U.S.
- Died: May 31, 1951 (aged 85) Philadelphia, Pennsylvania, U.S.
- Motto: Crucis in Signo Vinces (You will conquer in the sign of the cross)

Ordination history
History
Priestly ordination
- Ordained by: Lucido Parocchi
- Date: May 31, 1890
Episcopal consecration
- Principal consecrator: Francesco Satolli
- Co-consecrators: Pietro Gasparri, Enrico Grazioli
- Date: June 14, 1903
Cardinalate
- Elevated by: Pope Benedict XV
- Date: March 7, 1921
Episcopal succession
Bishops consecrated by Dennis Joseph Dougherty as principal consecrator
- James Paul McCloskey: 1917
- Michael Joseph Crane: 1921
- Daniel James Gercke: 1923
- Edmond John Fitzmaurice: 1925
- Edwin Vincent Byrne: 1925
- Thomas Charles O'Reilly: 1928
- Gerald Patrick Aloysius O'Hara: 1929
- George Leo Leech: 1935
- Hugh Louis Lamb: 1936
- Eugene Joseph McGuinness: 1937
- Joseph Moran Corrigan: 1940
- Joseph Carroll McCormick: 1947
- Thomas Joseph McDonough: 1947
- Francis Edward Hyland: 1949

Styles of Dennis Joseph Dougherty
- Reference style: His Eminence; The Most Reverend Eminence
- Spoken style: Your Eminence
- Religious style: Cardinal
- Informal style: Cardinal

Dennis Joseph Dougherty (August 16, 1865 – May 31, 1951) was an American Catholic prelate who served as archbishop of Philadelphia from 1918 until his death in 1951. He was made a cardinal in 1921. He was Philadelphia's longest-serving archbishop and its first cardinal.

Dougherty previously served as bishop of Buffalo from 1915 to 1918, and bishop of the Diocese of Jaro (1903–1908) and Diocese of Nueva Segovia (1908–1915) in the Philippines.

== Early life and education ==
Dennis Dougherty was born on August 16, 1865, in the Homesville section of Butler Township in Schuylkill County, Pennsylvania. Nicknamed "Dinny" by his parents, he was the sixth of ten children of Patrick and Bridget (née Henry) Dougherty, who were natives of County Mayo in Ireland. The family lived in the Coal Region of Pennsylvania, with Dougherty's father working as a coal miner and Dougherty himself spending his summer vacations as a breaker boy in the mines. As there was no Catholic church or parochial school in Homesville, the family worshiped at St. Joseph's Church in nearby Girardville, Pennsylvania, and Dougherty attended public school there as well.

At age 14, having decided to become a priest, Dougherty applied to enter St. Charles Borromeo Seminary in Philadelphia, Pennsylvania. He passed the entrance examination, but was denied admission due to his young age. On the advice of his pastor in Girardville, Dougherty enrolled instead at the Collège Sainte-Marie in Montreal, Quebec, where he studied under the Jesuits for two years.

In 1881, Dougherty reapplied to St. Charles Borromeo and now was accepted, allowed to skip the first two years of instruction. He remained at the seminary until 1885, when Archbishop Patrick John Ryan sent him to Rome to continue his studies at the Pontifical North American College in Rome. The faculty considered Dougherty as such an outstanding student that Professor Francesco Satolli on one occasion waved him away from an examination room, saying, "Consider yourself examined." In 1890, Dougherty received a Doctor of Divinity degree.

== Priesthood ==
While in Rome, Dougherty was ordained a priest for the Archdiocese of Philadelphia on May 31, 1890, by Cardinal Lucido Parocchi at the Archbasilica of Saint John Lateran. Dougherty celebrated his first Mass the next day at the altar of the Chair of Saint Peter at St. Peter's Basilica.

Upon his return to Philadelphia in the summer of 1890, the archdiocese added Dougherty to the faculty of St. Charles Borromeo as a professor of Latin, English, and history. Over the next 13 years, he also taught Greek, French, and Hebrew before being promoted to the chair of dogmatic theology.

As a professor, Dougherty was known to be "a severe taskmaster" who lectured almost entirely in Latin. He also established a reputation as a scholar with his translation into English of the works of the Italian archeologist Orazio Marucchi and his publication of a series of articles on Anglican ordinations. The Catholic University of America offered Dougherty the chair of dogmatic theology but Archbishop Ryan refused to let him leave St. Charles Borromeo.

== Bishop in the Philippines ==
=== Nueva Segovia ===
On April 7, 1903, Dougherty was notified of his appointment as bishop of Nueva Segovia in the Philippines. The United States had occupied the Philippines during the Spanish-American War of 1898. The 1898 Treaty of Paris had rejected Filipino independence, fueling the Philippine–American War of 1899 to 1902. During this conflict, the Filipino priest Gregorio Aglipay broke with Vatican and founded the nationalist Philippine Independent Church, taking over Catholic properties in that nation. After the insurgency ended with an American victory in 1902, Pope Leo XIII appointed Dougherty and three other American bishops to administer the Filipino dioceses.

Dougherty received his episcopal consecration on June 14, 1903, from now Cardinal Satolli with Cardinal Pietro Gasparri and Archbishop Enrico Grazioli serving as co-consecrators, at the church of Santi Giovanni e Paolo al Celio in Rome. Dougherty then returned to Philadelphia and recruited five priests to join him in the Philippines, including Daniel James Gercke and John Bernard MacGinley. The bishop and his priests sailed from Philadelphia on August 24, 1903 and arrived at the diocesan seat in Vigan in the Philippines on October 22.

The Philippine–American War had left many Catholic institutions in the Philippines in a state of disrepair. In addition, Aglipay and his supporters still controlled several church properties, including the Cathedral of Vigan. The Filipinos were resentful of the American occupation and wanted their own bishops. As a result, Dougherty received a cold welcome. In September 1904, Bishop Thomas Augustine Hendrick told US President Theodore Roosevelt that "three attempts have been made to murder Bishop Dougherty of Vigan..." To regain the church properties in Nueva Segovia, Dougherty got a court order forcing Aglipay to relinquish them. Dougherty then made house-to-house visits in Vigan to solicit funds to repair the cathedral.

Dougherty reopened the diocesan seminary in 1904, which had been occupied by American troops during the insurgency, and staffed it with the Jesuits. A girls' academy was also reopened under the care of the Sisters of Saint Paul of Chartres, who established a second academy in Tuguegarao, Dougherty toured the diocese on horseback and by canoe, confirming as many as 70,000 children in his travels.

=== Jaro ===
Following the death of Bishop Frederick Z. Rooker, Pope Pius X named Dougherty as bishop of Jaro on June 21, 1908. Jaro had a Catholic population of 1.3 million, but only half of the 151 churches had resident pastors. During his tenure in Jaro, Dougherty managed to find pastors for 41 churches while also establishing six new parishes and converting 12 missions into parishes. He opened a hospital staffed by the Sisters of Saint Paul of Chartres, who had worked with him in Nueva Segovia. To combat the efforts of Protestant missionaries in the diocese, Dougherty operated a movie theater where the price of admission was a Protestant Bible.

After the Vatican appointed San Francisco's auxiliary bishop Denis J. O'Connell as bishop of Richmond in 1912, Archbishop Patrick William Riordan sought a coadjutor bishop for the archdiocese. His first choice was Dougherty, whom he had met in 1903 during a stopover in San Francisco en route to the Philippines. Dougherty wanted the appointment, but it was vetoed by Cardinal Rafael Merry del Val, who believed that Dougherty was needed more in the Philippines.

== Bishop of Buffalo ==
After 12 years in the Philippines, Dougherty's health was beginning to fail in early 1915; he requested that the Vatican reassign him to the United States. Bishop Charles H. Colton of the Diocese of Buffalo had died in May 1915, followed by Archbishop James Edward Quigley of the Archdiocese of Chicago in July 1915. Pope Benedict XV initially wanted to send Dougherty to Chicago and Bishop George Mundelein to Buffalo. However, these plans changed when the British government heard about the Vatican's intentions. Fighting the German Empire in World War I, Britain reportedly objected to having Mundelein, an American citizen of German descent, stationed in Buffalo, which was on the Canadian border. To placate the British, Benedict XV allegedly switched the appointments by sending Mundelein to Chicago and naming Dougherty as bishop of Buffalo on December 9, 1915.

Dougherty formally took charge of his new diocese on June 7, 1916, when he was installed at St. Joseph Cathedral in Buffalo At the time of Dougherty's arrival, the diocese was burdened with a debt of $1.6 million from the construction of the new cathedral. Dougherty almost eliminated that debt by taxing the diocese's parishes according to their means. During his tenure, he also established 15 new parishes. After the United States entered World War I in 1917, Dougherty supported the war effort through liberty bond campaigns to fund the war effort and Red Cross drives.

== Archbishop of Philadelphia ==
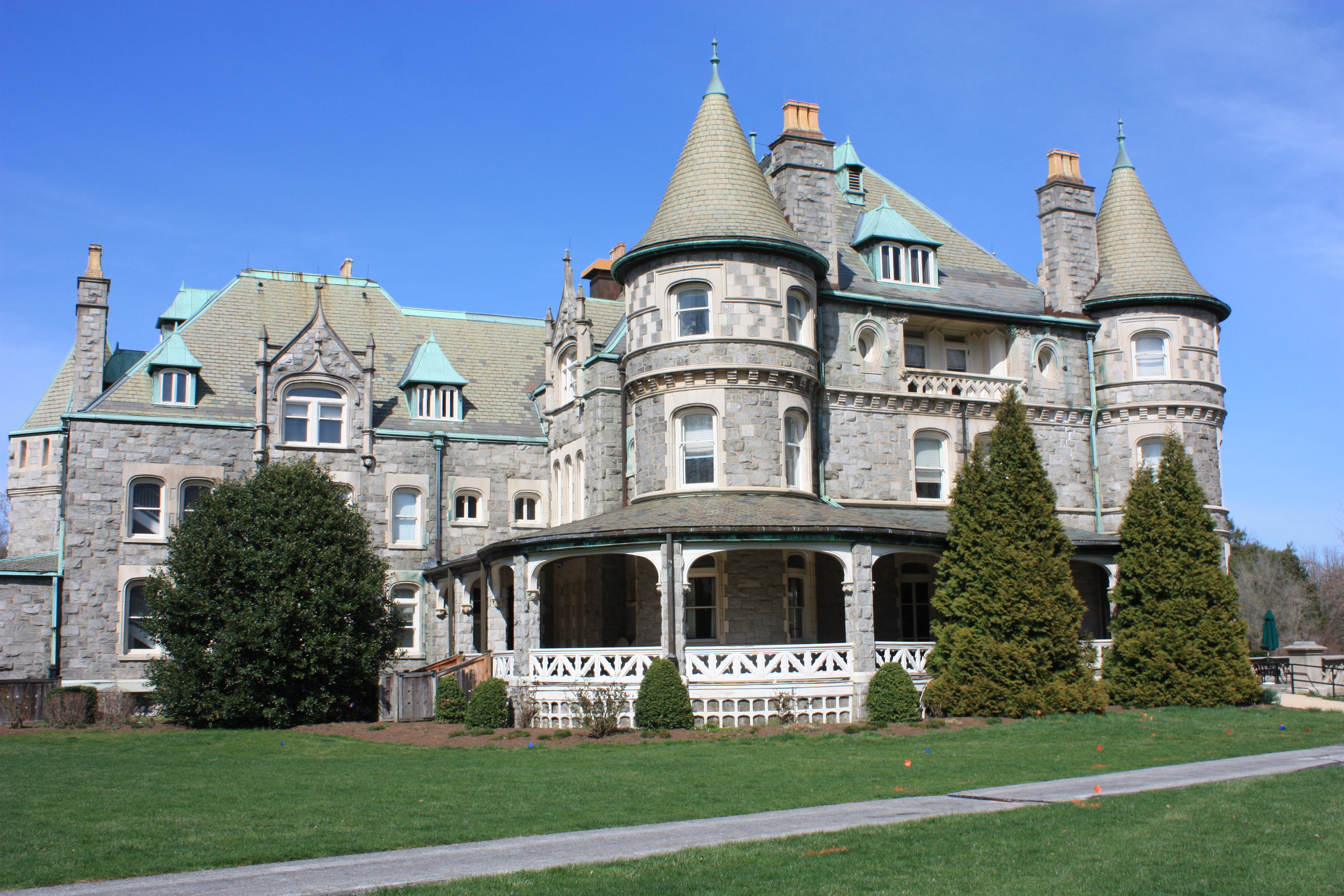
Rosemont College, Rosemont, Pennsylvania (2013)

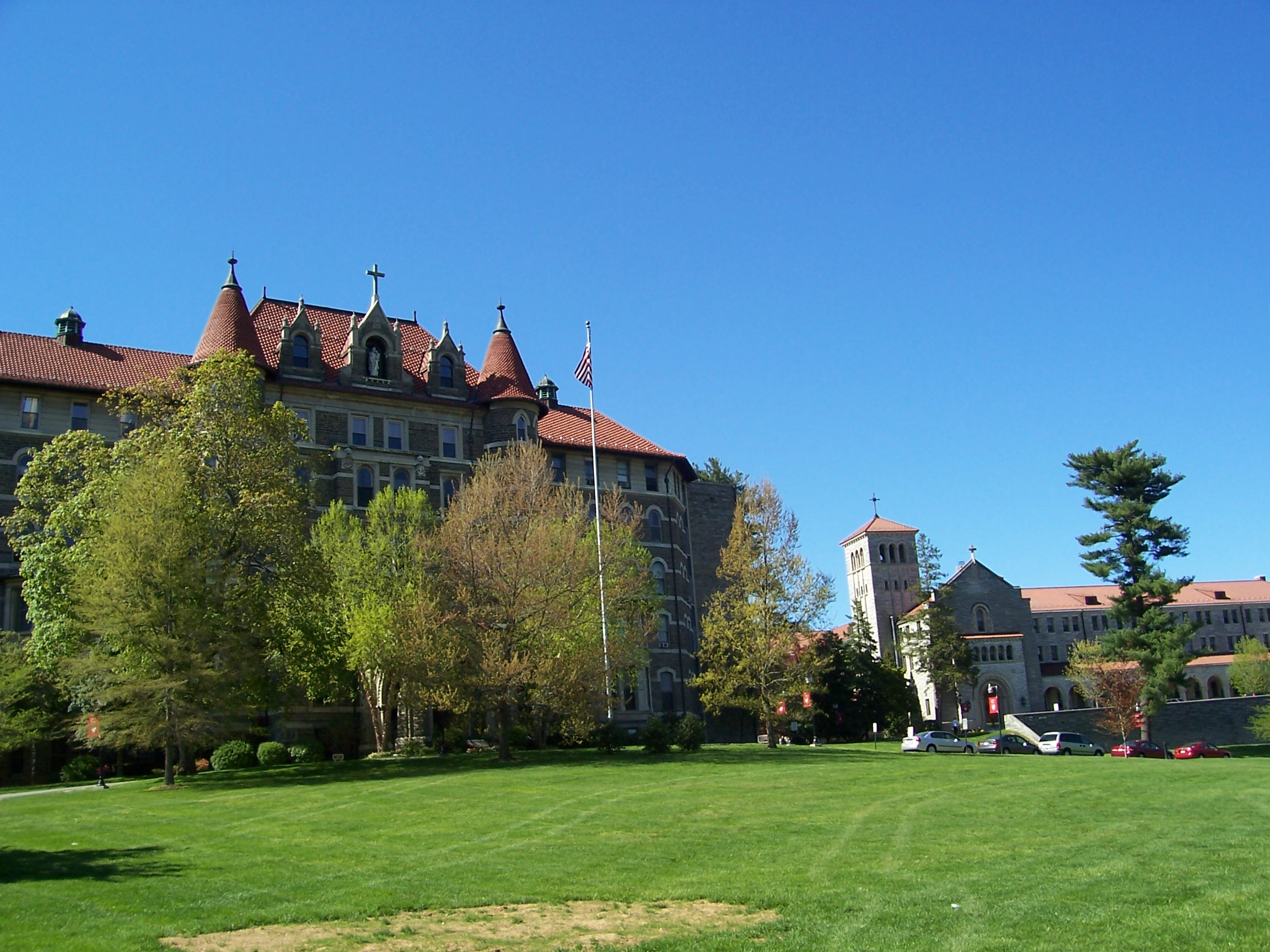
Chestnut Hill College, Philadelphia, Pennsylvania (2006)

Following the death of Archbishop Edmond Francis Prendergast, Dougherty was appointed archbishop of Philadelphia by Benedict XV on May 1, 1918. Dougherty was installed on July 10, 1918, at the Cathedral of Saints Peter and Paul in a ceremony presided over by Cardinal James Gibbons.

Similar to his time as a seminary professor, Dougherty was known as the "strictest disciplinarian...[who] rules his clergy with an iron hand, insists on punctuality, obedience, deference." He was also known as "God's Bricklayer" for his massive expansion of the archdiocese. During his 33-year tenure in Philadelphia, the number of Catholics in the archdiocese increased from approximately 710,000 to 1,031,866; priests from 779 to 1,910; religious sisters from 3,884 to 6,819; churches from 327 to 397; hospitals from six to 18; parochial schools from 180 to 325; high schools from three to 56; and colleges from three to seven. Among the colleges founded in the archdiocese during his tenure were Immaculata University in East Whitland Township (1920), Rosemont College in Rosemont (1921), Chestnut Hill College in Philadelphia (1924), and Gwynedd Mercy University in Lower Gwynedd Township (1948).

=== 1918 influenza pandemic ===
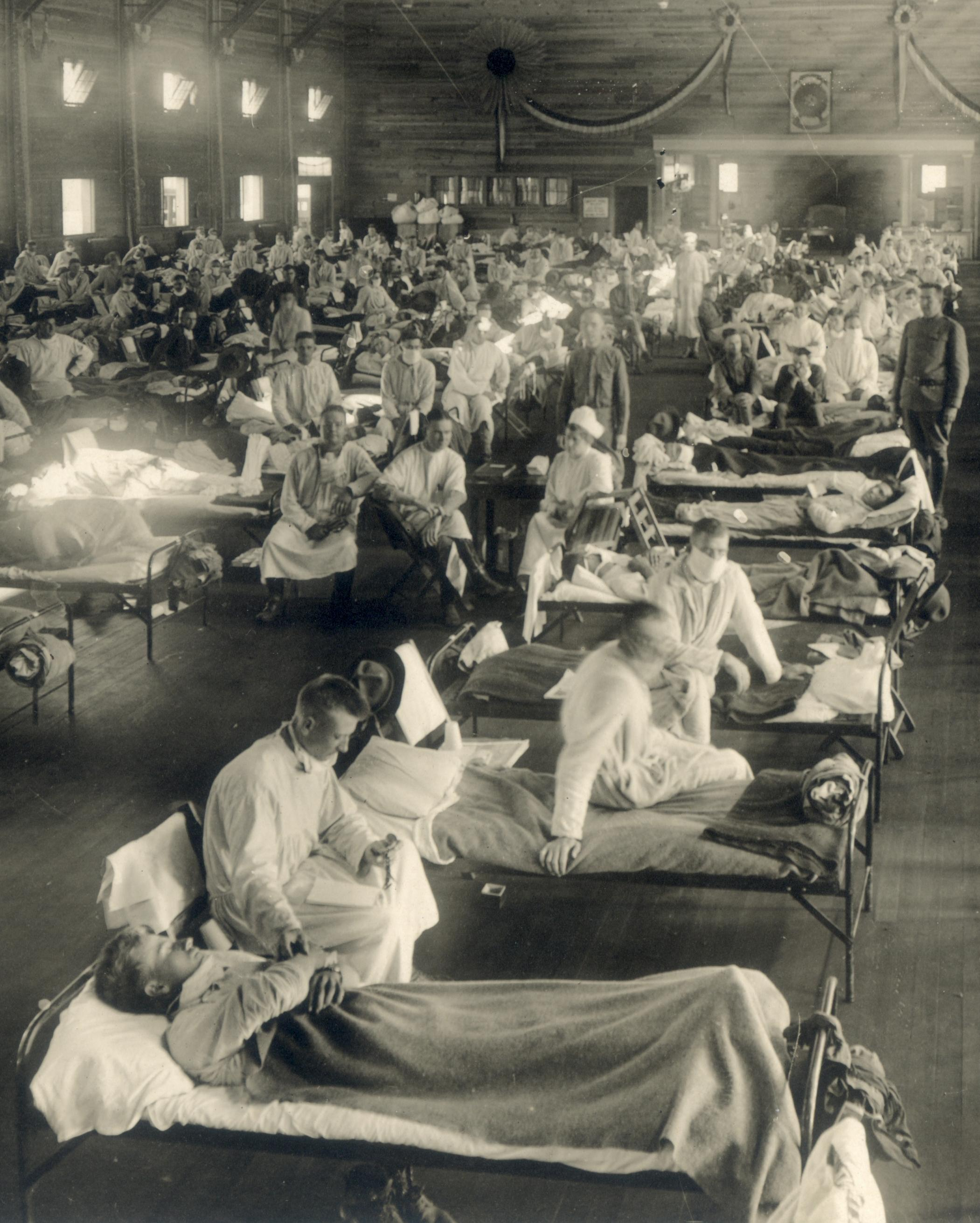
Emergency hospital in Kansas for Spanish Flu victims (1918)

Very early into Dougherty's tenure as archbishop, the 1918 influenza pandemic struck Philadelphia. More than 17,500 Philadelphians died in the first six months of the pandemic, with a single-day high of 837 deaths. The Philadelphia Liberty Loans Parade, held nearly three months after Dougherty's arrival, resulted in 12,000 deaths alone.

To deal with the crisis, Dougherty authorized the use of church facilities as temporary hospitals. Many nuns worked as nurses and Dougherty asked for volunteer gravediggers among the students at St. Charles Borromeo Seminary. In compliance with the Pennsylvania State Board of Health's order in October 1918, Dougherty closed all churches and schools to public gatherings. When the pandemic subsided, Philadelphia Mayor Thomas B. Smith expressed his gratitude to Dougherty by saying,

"I look upon the services rendered by the Archbishop and the nuns as one of the most potent aids in making the headway we have toward getting control of the epidemic."

=== Cardinal ===
On February 13, 1921, the Vatican announced that Benedict XV would elevate Dougherty to the College of Cardinals. Dougherty was created cardinal-priest of the Basilica of Santi Nereo e Achilleo in Rome during the consistory of March 7, 1921. He was the first archbishop of Philadelphia to serve as a cardinal, beginning a tradition that would last for 90 years. As a cardinal, Dougherty served as a member of the congregations for Discipline of the Sacraments, for Rites, for Propagation of the Faith, and for Oriental Churches.

Dougherty was unable to participate in his first papal conclave. He was touring the West Indies when Benedict XV died on January 22, 1922. After quickly returning to Philadelphia, he sailed from New York City to Europe with Cardinal Louis-Nazaire Bégin of Quebec on January 28th. However, Dougherty noted that he did not expect to arrive in time for the start of the conclave on February 2nd. Their ship was delayed by severe storms, and the two cardinals received news of the election of Pope Pius XI while at sea. After finally arriving in Rome on February 9th, Dougherty was granted a private audience with the new pope, who had relatives living in Bloomsburg, Pennsylvania. After the death of Pope Pius XI, Dougherty was able to participate in the 1939 conclave that elected Pope Pius XII.

=== Catholic education ===
Dougherty, whose entire time as a priest was spent in teaching, insisted on the establishment of a parochial school at every parish. He frequently threatened to suspend priests who were unwilling to follow this directive, believing,

"A parochial school is a necessity, especially in this country where our children breathe in an atmosphere of heresy, unbelief, and sometimes irreligion...Priests and parents are bound to provide a religious education for children."

In an address to the graduating class of Villanova University in Villanova, Pennsylvania, in June 1921, Dougherty denounced plans for a federal Department of Education, saying, "We give notice that we will never permit our Catholic schools to be controlled by a clique of politicians in Washington."

=== Ethnic groups ===
To offset the intensifying efforts of Protestant evangelization among Italian Philadelphians, Dougherty introduced Italian classes at St. Charles Borromeo Seminary and placed priests who had studied in Rome at Italian churches. However, he also discouraged Italian religious festivals like the Feast of San Gennaro, which were popular elsewhere in the country, to encourage assimilation. Tensions between Dougherty and the Italian Catholic community reached a high point in 1933, when the cardinal's plan to close the Italian parish of Our Lady of Good Counsel in South Philadelphia sparked a riot. On the eve of the parish's closure, thousands of parishioners occupied the church and even held a priest hostage for five months. The congregation took the case to the Supreme Court of Pennsylvania but lost, and Dougherty finally closed the church in 1937.

From 1921 until his death in 1951, Dougherty served as president of the Commission for the Catholic Missions among the Colored People and the Indians. He encouraged the work of Mother Katharine Drexel among Native Americans and African Americans, and once wrote,

"Perhaps the greatest problem confronting the nation is that of the colored race, who were brought here as slaves and have been abandoned to their fate."

In 1923, Dougherty declared that elementary school admissions would be based on parish residence, regardless of race, ending a policy of segregating African-American children to schools in predominantly African-American parishes. The following year he established Holy Savior Parish (now St. Ignatius) in West Philadelphia, where the Sisters of the Blessed Sacrament also opened a convent in 1925. Holy Redeemer Parish for Chinese Catholics was opened in 1941.

=== Movie theater ban ===
In May 1934, Dougherty forbid Catholics in the archdiocese from entering movie theaters. He declared that the film industry's focus on "sex and crime" was a "vicious and insidious attack...on the very foundations of our Christian civilization." He added: "The only argument likely to be heard now is that which affects the box office." As a result, ticket sales in the archdiocese soon dropped by 20 to 40 percent.

Due to the decrease in box office revenue, many studio executives and other public figures begged Dougherty to end the boycott, including the producer Samuel Goldwyn and the Philadelphia politician John B. Kelly Sr. Dougherty twice refused to arrange a meeting with Harry Warner, the president of Warner Bros. Dougherty never revoked his ban, but over time Catholics in the archdiocese started ignoring it. In June 1934, one Philadelphia Catholic, Joseph Breen, was appointed to head the newly created Production Code Administration and apply the Hays Code, a set of censorship rules, to American film production.

=== Philadelphia priests accused of sexual abuse ===
According to an official history of the archdiocese, Dougherty "reserved the appointment of pastors to himself, though a powerful intercessor could of course help." A 2005 grand jury report included at least two priests during Dougherty's tenure (1918–1951) who were accused of sexual abuse and transferred to other parishes:

- Reverend Gerard W. Chambers was accused of molesting numerous altar boys during his 40 years as a priest in the archdiocese. During that time, he was transferred to 11 different parishes under Dougherty's tenure between 1934 and 1949.
- Reverend Joseph P. Gausch wrote letters to another priest detailing his abuse of young boys. These letters were brought to Dougherty's attention in 1948. Dougherty sent Gausch to a hospital in Wisconsin to do "penance," then reassigned him to St. Anthony of Padua Parish in Easton, Pennsylvania in 1949.

== Later life and death ==
During the 1948 US presidential election, Dougherty gave the invocation at the Republican National Convention and later the Democratic National Convention, both of which were held in Philadelphia. In February 1949, he held his first press conference since becoming a cardinal in 1921 to denounce the treatment of Cardinal József Mindszenty by the communist government of Hungary. Dougherty labeled the trial a "mockery of justice."

On the morning of May 31, 1951, shortly after celebrating a private Mass marking the 61st anniversary of his priestly ordination, Dougherty died from a stroke at his residence in Philadelphia. His funeral Mass was celebrated by Bishop J. Carroll McCormick, Dougherty's nephew and an auxiliary bishop of Philadelphia. Dougherty is buried in the crypt of the Cathedral Basilica of Saints Peter and Paul.

Cardinal Dougherty High School in Philadelphia was named in his honor.

== Sources ==
- Nolan, Hugh J. (1976). "Chapter 6: The Native Son". In Connelly, James F. (ed.). The History of the Archdiocese of Philadelphia. Archdiocese of Philadelphia. pp. 339–418.
- Thornton, Francis B. (1963). "Chapter 5: Dennis Cardinal Dougherty". Our American Princes: The Story of the Seventeen American Cardinals. G. P. Putnam's Sons. pp. 100–118.
- Morris, Charles R. (2002). "God's Bricklayer". American Catholic Studies. 113 (3/4): 3–53. JSTOR 44195159.

Catholic Church titles
| Preceded by José Hevía y Campomanes | Bishop of Nueva Segovia; 1903–1908 | Succeeded by James Jordan Carroll |
| Preceded by Frederick Zadok Rooker | Bishop of Jaro; 1908–1915 | Succeeded by Maurice Patrick Foley |
| Preceded by Charles H. Colton | Bishop of Buffalo; 1915–1918 | Succeeded by William Turner |
| Preceded by Edmond Francis Prendergast | Archbishop of Philadelphia; 1918–1951 | Succeeded by John Francis O'Hara |
