= James Timlin =

American prelate of the Catholic Church (1927–2023)

His Excellency, The Most Reverend James Clifford Timlin
- Bishop of Scranton
- Church: Roman Catholic Church
- Archdiocese: Philadelphia
- Diocese: Scranton
- Appointed: April 24, 1984
- Installed: June 7, 1984
- Term ended: July 25, 2003
- Predecessor: John Joseph O'Connor
- Successor: Joseph Francis Martino
- Previous posts: Auxiliary Bishop of Scranton and Titular Bishop of Gunugus (1976–1984)

Orders
- Ordination: July 16, 1951 by Martin John O'Connor
- Consecration: September 21, 1976 by J. Carroll McCormick, John R. Quinn, and Stanley Joseph Ott

Personal details
- Born: August 5, 1927 Scranton, Pennsylvania, U.S.
- Died: April 9, 2023 (aged 95) Scranton

James Clifford Timlin (August 5, 1927 – April 9, 2023) was an American prelate of the Roman Catholic Church. He served as bishop of the Diocese of Scranton in Pennsylvania from 1984 to 2003. Timlin was accused in a 2018 Pennsylvania grand jury report of covering up sexual abuse crimes by priests in his diocese during his tenure as bishop.

== Biography ==
=== Early years ===
James Timlin was born on August 5, 1927, in Scranton, Pennsylvania, to James and Helen (née Norton) Timlin. He received his elementary education at St. John the Evangelist Grade School in Wilkes-Barre, Pennsylvania, and Holy Rosary Grade School in Scranton. He then attended Holy Rosary High School in Scranton. After high school, Timlin enrolled at St. Charles College in Catonsville, Maryland, then went to St. Mary's Seminary in Baltimore, Maryland. The diocese then sent him to reside at the Pontifical North American College while attending the Pontifical Gregorian University in Rome.

=== Priesthood ===
On July 16, 1951, Timlin was ordained to the priesthood for the Diocese of Scranton by Archbishop Martin J. O'Connor. He then earned his Bachelor of Sacred Theology degree from the Gregorian University.

After returning to Scranton, the diocese assigned Timlin as assistant pastor of St. John the Evangelist Parish in Pittston, Pennsylvania, in 1952. Timlin then served as assistant pastor of St. Peter's Cathedral Parish in Scranton from 1953 to 1966 when he was named assistant chancellor of the diocese and private secretary to Bishop J. Carroll McCormick. Timlin was raised by the Vatican to the rank of chaplain to his holiness in 1967, and became chancellor of the diocese in 1971. Timlin was honored by the Vatican as a prelate of honor on April 23, 1972. He also served as chairman of the diocesan Liturgical Commission and the Priests' Education Committee, as well as librarian and secretary of St. Pius X Seminary in Dalton, Pennsylvania. Timlin became a member of the diocesan Board of Consultors in 1972 and president of the board of directors of The Catholic Light in 1975.

=== Auxiliary Bishop of Scranton ===
On July 26, 1976, Pope Paul VI appointed Timlin as an auxiliary bishop of Scranton and titular bishop of Gunugus. He received his episcopal consecration on September 21, 1976, from Bishop McCormick, with archbishop John R. Quinn and bishop Stanley J. Ott serving as coconsecrators, at St. Peter's Basilica in Vatican City. Serving a five-year term as episcopal moderator of the National Association of Holy Name Societies, Timlin became vicar general of the diocese in 1976 and pastor of the Nativity of Our Lord Parish in Scranton in 1979. In 1983, Timlin was named chairman of the board of advisors of St. Pius X Seminary and of the Preparatory Commission for the Diocesan Synod.

=== Bishop of Scranton ===
On April 24, 1984, Pope John Paul II appointed Timlin as the eighth bishop of Scranton. Installed on June 7, 1984, Timlin was the first native of Scranton to become its diocesan bishop. During his tenure, Timlin held the Second Diocesan Synod, established the Bishop's Annual Appeal, presided over a major restructuring of parishes as a result of the priest shortage. He introduced a new policy for Catholic schools consisting of regional mergers, construction of modern facilities, new fundraising efforts, and a more equitable sharing of operational costs between parents, pastors, and the diocese.

In 1985, Timlin announced that he would not attend two events honoring Catholic congressmen because of their support for abortion rights for women. The first event was in honor of Democratic House Representative Peter W. Rodino Jr. at a St. Patrick's Day dinner in Lackawanna County, Pennsylvania. The second event was the awarding of an honorary degree to Democratic Speaker of the House Tip O'Neill Jr. at a commencement ceremony at the University of Scranton. In 2003, Timlin refused to attend the commencement ceremonies for the University of Scranton because of the pro-choice stance of honorary-degree recipient Chris Matthews.

=== Retirement, legacy and death ===
After reaching the mandatory retirement age of 75 in 2002, Timlin sent his letter of resignation as bishop of Scranton to Pope John Paul II; the pope accepted it on July 25, 2003. Timlin then served as administrator of St. Joseph's Parish in Wilkes-Barre from February to July 2004, when he became rector of Villa St. Joseph in Dunmore, Pennsylvania, the diocesan residence for retired priests.

On August 14, 2018, a Pennsylvania grand jury investigation criticized Timlin's handling of sexual abuse allegations against Thomas Skotek, a priest at St Casimir Parish in Freeland, Pennsylvania. Between 1980 and 1985, Skotek had raped and eventually impregnated a teenage girl in the parish. In October 1986, after Timlin learned about the crime, he sent Skotek to Saint Luke Institute in Silver Spring, Maryland, for psychological evaluation. Timlin wrote to Skotek at Saint Luke on October 9, 1986:

This is a very difficult time in your life, and I realize how upset you are. I share your grief. (...) With the help of God, who never abandons us and who is always near, when we need him, this too will pass away, and all will be able to pick up and go on living. Please be assured that I am most willing to do whatever I can do to help.

In 1987, after Skotek returned to the diocese, Timlin reassigned him to St. Aloysius Parish in Wilkes-Barre. Timlin never notified parishioners in St. Aloysius or civil authorities about Skotek's rape of the girl. On December 13, 1989, the diocese sent a payment of $75,000 to the family of the rape victim. As part of the settlement, the family had to sign a non-disclosure agreement and liability waiver for both the diocese and Skotek. The 2018 grand jury investigation also indicated that Timlin sent a request to the judge sentencing Robert Caparelli, another priest convicted of sexual abuse, asking that he be sent to a church treatment center instead of prison. On June 11, 2020, the University of Scranton removed Timlin's name from all of its facilities, renaming its plaza Romero Plaza after Salvadoran archbishop Óscar Romero.

On August 31, 2018, Scranton bishop Joseph Bambera prohibited Timlin from representing the diocese at any public events, liturgical or otherwise. This was the strongest action that Bambera could apply against Timlin. Bambera also referred the Timlin case to the Vatican Congregation for Bishops. Bambera had served as the vicar for priests for the diocese from 1995 to 1998, and he later admitted helping Timlin reassign a priest who had abused a minor, although Timlin made the decision.

On November 12, 2018, Timlin defied Bambera's order by attending the United States Conference of Catholic Bishops general assembly in Baltimore. On February 25, 2020, Timlin again defied Bambera by attending the installation mass of archbishop Nelson J. Pérez, dressed in bishop's regalia. A spokesperson for the Archdiocese of Philadelphia confirmed that it had invited Timlin to the mass.

Timlin, Bambera and the Diocese of Scranton were sued in July 2020 by three men claiming sexual abuse when they were minors by diocese priests. Two plaintiffs alleged abuse by Michael J. Pulicare, a priest in Lackawanna County, Pennsylvania, in the 1970s. The third plaintiff claimed abuse by Ralph N. Ferraldo, an assistant pastor at Our Lady of Grace Parish in Hazleton, Pennsylvania, from 1982 to 1983.

Timlin died in Scranton on April 9, 2023, at age 95.

== See also ==
- Catholic Church hierarchy
- Catholic Church in the United States
- Historical list of the Catholic bishops of the United States
- List of Catholic bishops of the United States
- Lists of patriarchs, archbishops, and bishops

Catholic Church titles
Preceded by John Joseph O'Connor	Bishop of Scranton; 1984–2003	Succeeded by Joseph Francis Martino
Preceded by Onesimo Cadiz Gordoncillo	Titular Bishop of Gunugus; 1976–1984	Succeeded by Vigilio Mario Olmi
Preceded by –	Auxiliary Bishop of Scranton; 1976–1984	Succeeded by –
