= Seton Catholic High School (Pittston, Pennsylvania) =

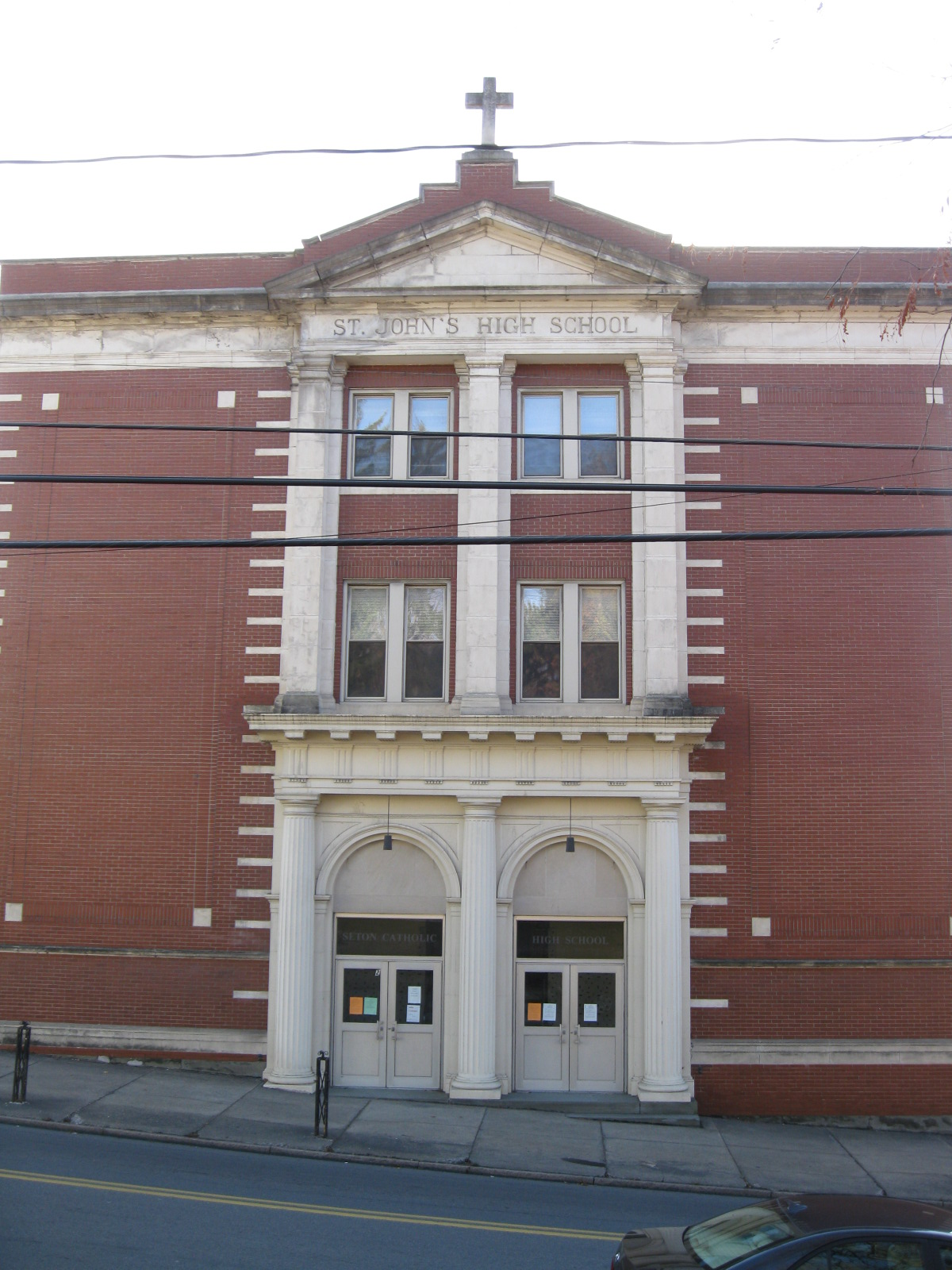
- St. John's High School (2009)

Location
- William Street; Pittston, Luzerne County, Pennsylvania; United States

Information
- Other name: Seton Central Catholic High School; St. John the Evangelist School; St. John's High School
- Established: March 17, 1900
- Closed: June 2007, consolidated into Holy Redeemer High School

Seton Catholic High School was a Roman Catholic high school in Pittston, Pennsylvania named after Elizabeth Ann Seton. The school was originally called St. John's High School, and burned down on February 19, 1960. It was renovated in 1961, renamed in 1976 to the Seton Catholic High School, and was consolidated into Holy Redeemer High School in 2007.

== History ==
The St. John's parochial schools date back to 1864 with the first graduating class of the St. John's Academy being in 1865.

In 1881, plans for a free school were developed and an initial donation of $2,000 was provided by Michael Reap. The St. John's High School was chartered on March 17, 1900.

=== Fire of 1960 ===
Approximately 1:20 P.M. on February 19, 1960, a fire erupted at the school. 770 students were evacuated. The fire raged until approximately 3:00 P.M. None were harmed except for two firefighters with foot injuries and five that suffered from smoke inhalation.

The area had received a snowfall the evening prior. The fire was caused by a faulty wire on the third floor of the building. More than 300 firemen battled the fire. A malfunctioning city alarm system delayed arrival of some of the firefighters and water pressure hindered volunteers from fighting the fire.

During the fire, some of the boys went back into the building to save records and a statue of the Virgin Mary. The police estimated the damage caused by the fire was approximately $1 million.

The building cost approximately $750,000 to restore. Along with the building, a new youth center was erected, and classes resumed in the main building on November 13, 1961.

=== Seton Catholic High School ===
The school was renamed as the Seton Catholic High School (or Seton Central Catholic High School) on June 21, 1976, in honor of Elizabeth Ann Seton, who had been canonized in 1975. On September 1, 1976, management of the operations of the school became shared across 24 parishes in the general area of Pittston.

== Consolidation with Holy Redeemer High School ==
On January 17, 2007, Bishop Joseph Martino announced Seton Catholic would be consolidated with other schools in Luzerne County, including Bishop Hafey High School in Hazleton, Bishop Hoban High School in Wilkes-Barre, and Bishop O'Reilly High School in Kingston, into Holy Redeemer High School, a building previously occupied by Bishop Hoban High School.

== Notable alumni ==
- James Joseph Brown – mining engineer and inventor, husband of RMS Titanic survivor Molly Brown
- William M. Fay – judge
- Shawn Klush (1988) – musical artist
- Mary Ann Love (1958) – politician
- Thomas Tigue (1964) – politician

== See also ==
- Holy Redeemer High School
