= John Dougherty (bishop) =

American Roman Catholic prelate (1932–2022)

His Excellency, The Most Reverend John Martin Dougherty
- Auxiliary Bishop Emeritus of Scranton; Titular Bishop of Sufetula
- Archdiocese: Philadelphia
- Diocese: Scranton
- Appointed: February 7, 1995
- Installed: March 7, 1995
- Term ended: August 31, 2009
- Other post: Titular Bishop of Sufetula

Orders
- Ordination: June 15, 1957
- Consecration: March 7, 1995 by James Timlin, J. Carroll McCormick, and Francis X. DiLorenzo

Personal details
- Born: April 29, 1932 Scranton, Pennsylvania, U.S.
- Died: April 16, 2022 (aged 89) Scranton, Pennsylvania, U.S.

Styles of John Martin Dougherty
- Reference style: His Excellency; The Most Reverend
- Spoken style: Your Excellency
- Religious style: Bishop

John Martin Dougherty (April 29, 1932 – April 16, 2022) was an American prelate of the Roman Catholic Church. Dougherty served as the auxiliary bishop of the Diocese of Scranton in Pennsylvania from 1995 to 2009.

== Early life ==
John Dougherty was born in Scranton, Pennsylvania, to Edward and Irene (née Kern) Dougherty. After graduating from St. Paul High School in 1949, he entered St. Charles College in Catonsville, Maryland.

In 1951, Dougherty became a seminarian at St. Mary's Seminary in Baltimore, earning a Bachelor of Arts degree in 1953. In 1956, he was awarded a Master of Philosophy degree from the University of Notre Dame, then in 1957 a Licentiate of Sacred Theology from St. Mary's.

== Priesthood ==
On June 15, 1957, Dougherty was ordained to the priesthood for the Diocese of Scranton by Bishop Jerome D. Hannan at St. Peter's Cathedral in Scranton. After his ordination, Dougherty served as assistant pastor at St. Ann Parish in Tobyhanna, Pennsylvania. In 1962, Dougherty left St. Ann to become professor of ascetical theology at St. Pius X Seminary in Dalton, Pennsylvania. He also became in 1965 a director of the Society for the Propagation of the Faith in the regions.

In 1968 Dougherty was raised to the rank of chaplain of his holiness by Pope Paul VI and named vicar for religious by Bishop J. Carroll McCormick. Dougherty was appointed assistant chancellor of the diocese in 1972, also assuming the duties of pro-life director in 1976. He became chancellor of the diocese in 1977 and an honorary prelate of his holiness in 1978. In 1984, Dougherty was named vicar general and moderator of the curia. Dougherty received his first pastorate in 1984 at St. Patrick's Parish in West Scranton, Pennsylvania.

== Auxiliary Bishop of Scranton ==
On February 7, 1995, Pope John Paul II appointed Dougherty as an auxiliary bishop of the Diocese of Scranton and titular bishop of Sufetula. He was consecrated on March 7, 1995 by Bishop James C. Timlin, with Bishops McCormick and Francis X. DiLorenzo serving as co-consecrators, at St. Peter's Cathedral.

As an auxiliary bishop, Dougherty served as rector of the Villa Saint Joseph home for retired priests in Dunmore, Pennsylvania (1995-2004) and as vicar for administration (2004-2009). In April 2009, Dougherty joined some other American bishops in criticizing the University of Notre Dame's invitation to U.S. President Barack Obama to deliver its commencement speech and receive an honorary degree, given what the bishops termed his "numerous, repeated and extensive anti-life positions".

== Retirement ==
Upon reaching the mandatory retirement age of 75 for bishops, Dougherty submitted his letter of resignation as bishop of Scranton to Pope Benedict XVI in April 2007. The Pope accepted his resignation two years later on August 31, 2009.

Dougherty continued to serve as a member of the board of trustees of the Catholic Distance University. Prior to his death, he lived at Christ the King Parish in Archbald, Pennsylvania. He celebrated mass and heard confessions regularly.

On July 31, 2019, the Diocese of Scranton paid a settlement in a sexual abuse allegation dating to 1941. The victim alleged that she had been molested at age nine by Martin J Fleming, then a priest at Holy Name Parish in Swoyersville, Pennsylvania. The victim first made her allegation to an official of the Diocese of Venice in Florida. That official sent the information in April 2006 to the Diocese of Scranton. On June 30, 2006, the victim traveled to Pennsylvania and met with Dougherty to report the allegations against Fleming, now deceased. After listening to her story, Dougherty suggested she talk to a counselor or a good friend. Fleming was listed in the 2018 Pennsylvania grand jury report of abusive priests.

== Death ==
On April 16, 2022, he died in his family's home in Scranton, Pennsylvania.

== See also ==
- Catholic Church hierarchy
- Catholic Church in the United States
- Historical list of the Catholic bishops of the United States
- List of Catholic bishops of the United States
- Lists of patriarchs, archbishops, and bishops
