= Martin John O'Connor =

American prelate

The Most Reverend Martin John O'Connor
- Titular Archbishop of Laodicea
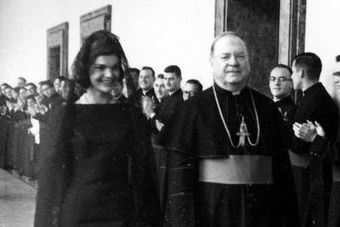
- Archbishop O'Connor accompanies First Lady Jacqueline Kennedy during her 1962 trip to the Vatican
- Other posts: Auxiliary Bishop of Scranton; Rector of the Pontifical North American College (1946–1964); President of the Pontifical Council for Social Communications (1948–1971); Apostolic Nuncio to Malta (1965–1969)

Orders
- Ordination: March 15, 1924 by Giuseppe Palica
- Consecration: January 27, 1943 by William Joseph Hafey

Personal details
- Born: May 18, 1900 Scranton, Pennsylvania, USA
- Died: December 1, 1986 (aged 86) Wilkes-Barre, Pennsylvania, USA
- Denomination: Roman Catholic

Styles of Martin John O'Connor
- Reference style: His Excellency
- Spoken style: Your Excellency

Martin John O'Connor (May 18, 1900 – December 1, 1986) was an American prelate of the Roman Catholic Church. He served as rector of the Pontifical North American College from 1946–1964 and president of the Pontifical Council for Social Communications from 1948–1971.

== Biography ==
=== Early life and education ===
Martin O'Connor was born on May 18, 1900, in Scranton, Pennsylvania, to Martin John and Belinda Catherine (née Caffrey) O'Connor. His parents died when he was young. He received his early education at James Madison Elementary School, but was later transferred to the district's administration building to attend advanced classes. O'Connor entered St. Thomas High School in Scranton at age 12, and enrolled at St. Thomas College three years later. He graduated from St. Thomas with a Bachelor of Arts degree in 1918.

O'Connor began his studies for the priesthood at St. Mary's Seminary in Baltimore, Maryland. He continued his studies at the Catholic University of America in Washington, D.C. While a student, he enlisted in the U.S Army after the United States entered World War I. Discharged in 1919, he resumed his studies at the university. After his college graduation, O'Connor went study at the Pontifical North American College in Rome. He earned a Doctor of Theology degree from the Pontifical Urban University in Rome in 1925.

=== Priesthood ===
On March 15, 1924, O'Connor was ordained a priest for the Diocese of Scranton by Archbishop Giuseppe Palica at the Basilica of St. John Lateran in Rome Following his return to Scranton, he was assigned as a curate at St. Peter's Cathedral Parish, serving there from 1925 to 1927. O'Connor then returned to Rome to earn a Doctor of Canon Law degree from the Apollinare University in 1929.

Returning to Pennsylvania in 1929, O'Connor was appointed secretary to Bishop Thomas O'Reilly and as chancellor of the diocese. He served as an associate editor of the diocesan newspaper, Catholic Light, from 1929 to 1932.From 1934 to 1943, O'Connor was pastor of St. Peter's Cathedral Parish. He was named a papal chamberlain in 1931, and raised to the rank of domestic prelate in 1936. In addition to his pastoral duties, O'Connor became vicar general of the diocese in 1938.

=== Auxiliary Bishop of Scranton ===
On November 14, 1942, O'Connor was appointed as an auxiliary bishop of the Diocese of Scranton and titular bishop of Thespiae by Pope Pius XII. He received his episcopal consecration on January 27, 1943, from Bishop William Hafey, with Bishops Gerald O'Hara and George L. Leech serving as co-consecrators, at St. Peter's Cathedral. As an auxiliary bishop, he continued to serve as vicar general of the diocese, a post which he held until 1946. He also served as pastor of St. Mary's Parish in Wilkes-Barre, Pennsylvania, from 1943 to 1946.

=== Rector of the Pontifical North American College ===
O'Connor was named rector of the Pontifical North American College in Rome on November 26, 1946, then still closed in the aftermath of World War II. O'Connor reopened the college in 1948, having supervised its construction of new campus on Janiculum Hill in Rome. Supposedly, O'Connor once said that his mission was "to educate others in gracious dining and papal protocol," to which U.S. Ambassador to the United Kingdom Joseph Kennedy Sr. responded, "Don't be such an ass." O'Connor allegedly disapproved of Archbishop Egidio Vagnozzi's appointment as apostolic delegate to the United States.

=== Curial official ===
With the establishment of the curial office of the Pontifical Council for Social Communications, Pius XII named O'Connor as its first president in January 1948. He was named an assistant at the pontifical throne in 1953. In November 1954, O'Connor was appointed as a counselor of the Congregation of Seminaries and Universities.

O'Connor was raised to titular archbishop of Laodicea in Syria on September 5, 1959. O'Connor attended all four sessions of the Second Vatican Council between 1962 and 1965. During the preparatory stages of the Council, he was named to head the press secretariat in June 1960. As head of the secretariat, he drafted a constitution dealing with the press, motion pictures, radio, and television. In September 1963, in response to complaints by journalists about the lack of news sources, he was appointed to head a new press committee for the second session of the Council.

=== Apostolic Nuncio to Malta ===
He became the first Nuncio to Malta on December 15, 1965. According to his Los Angeles Times obituary, "the appointment marked the first time a papal ambassador had been sent to a country in the United Kingdom since the Protestant Reformation 400 years earlier" – although technically, Malta was no longer in the United Kingdom after 1964.

=== Retirement ===
O'Connor resigned his diplomatic post in May 1969 and his curial post on September 8, 1971. He returned to Pennsylvania in 1980.Martin O'Connor died on December 1, 1986, at Mercy Hospital in Wilkes-Barre at age 86.

Catholic Church titles
Preceded by –	Auxiliary Bishop of Scranton; 1943–1946	Succeeded by –
Preceded by J. Gerald Kealy	Rector of the Pontifical North American College; 1946–1964	Succeeded by Francis Frederick Reh
Preceded by none	President of the Pontifical; Council for Social Communications; 1948–1971	Succeeded by Andrzej Maria Deskur
Preceded by none	Apostolic Nuncio to Malta; 1965–1969	Succeeded by Giuseppe Mojoli
