= Joseph Bambera =

American prelate of the Catholic Church

His Excellency, The Most Reverend Joseph Charles Bambera
- Bishop of Scranton
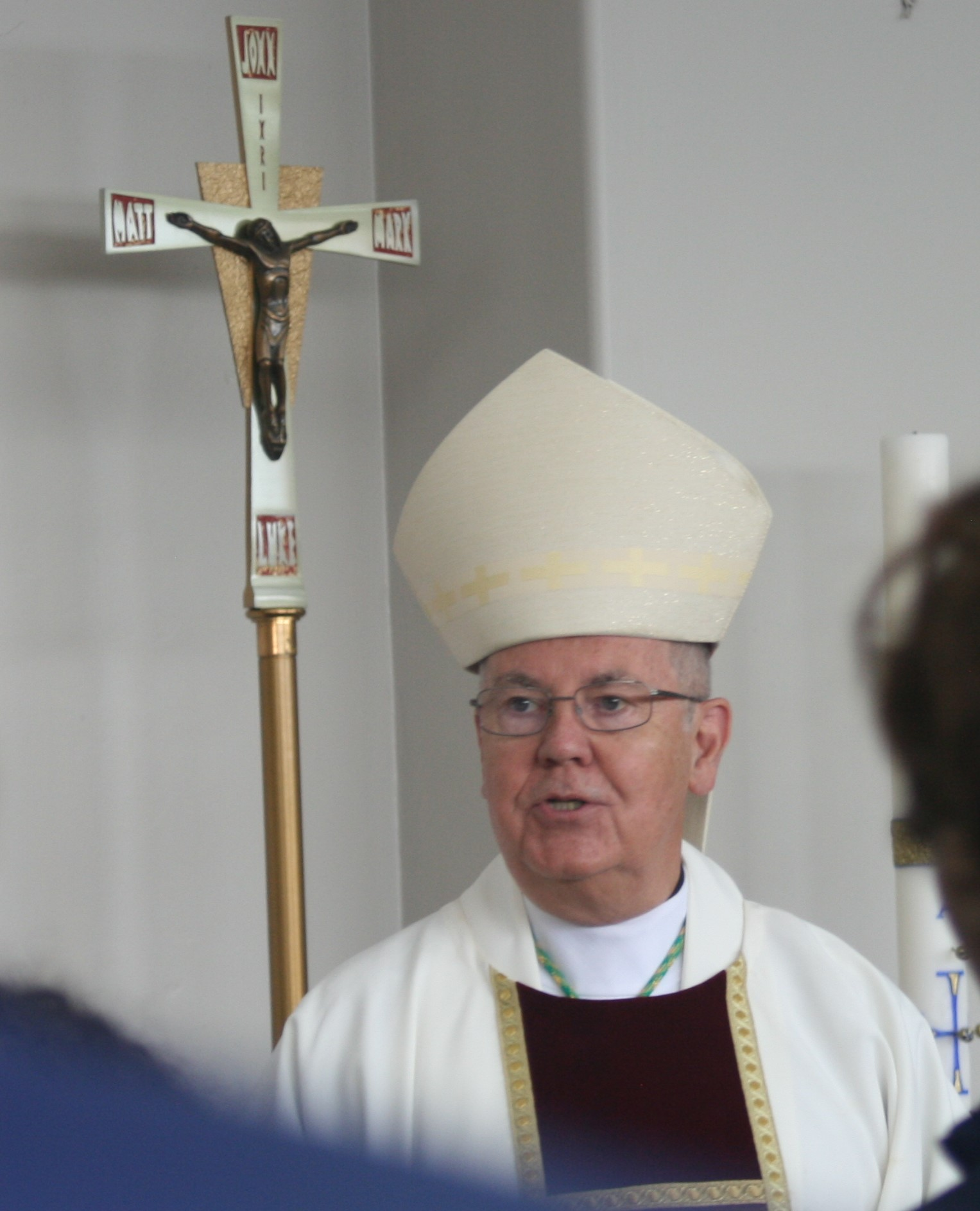
- Bambera in Williamsport in 2025
- Diocese: Scranton
- Appointed: February 23, 2010
- Installed: April 26, 2010
- Predecessor: Joseph Francis Martino

Orders
- Ordination: November 5, 1983 by John O'Connor
- Consecration: April 26, 2010 by Justin Francis Rigali, James Timlin, and John Dougherty

Personal details
- Born: March 21, 1956 (age 70) Carbondale, Pennsylvania, US
- Denomination: Roman Catholic Church
- Education: Saint Paul University Mary Immaculate Seminary University of Pittsburgh
- Motto: Walk humbly with your God

Styles of Joseph Charles Bambera
- Reference style: His Excellency; The Most Reverend
- Spoken style: Your Excellency
- Religious style: Bishop

Joseph Charles Bambera (born March 21, 1956) is an American Catholic prelate who has served as Bishop of Scranton in Pennsylvania since 2010.

== Biography ==
=== Early life and education ===
Joseph Bambera was born on March 21, 1956, in Carbondale, Pennsylvania, to Joseph and Irene (née Kucharski) Bambera. One of two children, he has a sister, Karen. He attended St. Rose of Lima Elementary School and graduated from St. Rose of Lima High School, both in Carbondale, in 1974. Following his graduation, Bambera entered the University of Pittsburgh, earning a Bachelor of Arts degree in art history there in 1978.

Bambera then began his studies for the priesthood, attending the University of Scranton in Scranton, Pennsylvania, and St. Pius X Seminary in Dalton, Pennsylvania. He continued his studies at Mary Immaculate Seminary in Northampton, Pennsylvania, where he earned a Master of Divinity degree in 1982. He was ordained to the diaconate by Bishop J. Carroll McCormick on May 14, 1983.

=== Priestly ministry ===
Bambera was ordained to the priesthood for the Diocese of Scranton by Bishop John J. O'Connor on November 5, 1983 at St. Peter's Cathedral in Scranton. After his ordination, the diocese assigned Bambera as an assistant pastor at St. Mary of the Assumption Parish in Scranton, where he remained for four years.

In 1987, Bambera was transferred to the St. Peter's Cathedral Parish. He served as auditor on the diocesan tribunal, spiritual director of the Legion of Mary chapter, campus minister at Lackawanna College in Scranton and diocesan director of pilgrimages. In 1989, Bambera entered St. Paul's University in Ottawa, Ontario, earning a Licentiate of Canon Law in 1991.

Upon his return to Scranton, Bambera was appointed a judge on the diocesan tribunal. He was later named diocesan director of ecumenism and interfaith affairs in 1993, and vicar for priests in 1995. During the 1990s and 2000s, Bambera served as pastor in several Pennsylvania parishes:

- Holy Name of Jesus in Scranton (1994 to 1997)
- St. John Bosco in Conyngham (1998 to 2001)
- Visitation of the Blessed Virgin Mary in Dickson City (2001 to 2007)
- St. Thomas Aquinas in Archbald (2007 to 2010)
- St. Mary of Czestochowa in Eynon (2007 to 2010)

Bambera was elevated to a prelate of honour by Pope John Paul II in 1997. Bambera was elected chair of the diocesan presbyteral council in 2000 and re-elected in 2002. He also served as president of the board of pastors at Bishop Hafey High School in Hazelton, Pennsylvania and Bishop O'Hara High School in Dumore, Pennsylvania, along with defender of the bond for the Eparchy of St. Maron of Brooklyn in New York City. Bambera served as a board member of the University of Scranton from 2003 to 2009, and was named a board member of St. Michael's School in Scranton in 2004.

Bambera became episcopal vicar for the Central Region of the diocese in 2005. He was appointed canonical consultant for pastoral planning for the diocese in 2007. In August 2009, Bambera was chosen to serve as delegate to Cardinal Justin Rigali, who was the apostolic administrator of the diocese following the resignation of Bishop Joseph Martino. In this position, Bambera oversaw the day-to-day operations of the diocese during the sede vacante.

=== Bishop of Scranton ===
On February 23, 2010, Bambera was appointed as bishop of Scranton by Pope Benedict XVI. Following the appointment, Bambera stated,

With deep humility, I offer thanks to Almighty God through whose providence and grace I've been called to serve the people of God in the Diocese of Scranton as bishop...As we begin a new chapter in the life of the Diocese of Scranton, may we continue to collaborate and to work together as we pursue charity and truth.

Bambera's episcopal consecration and installation took place at the St. Peter's Cathedral on April 26, 2010, with Rigali as the principal consecrator and Bishops James Timlin and John Dougherty serving as co-consecrators.

In August 2018, Bambera forbade Timlin, his predecessor as bishop, from representing the diocese in public, given Timlin's failure to protect children from abusers. Bambera, who had served as vicar for priests from 1995 to 1998, admitted that he helped Timlin reassign one priest who had abused a minor, although the decision was made by Timlin. Bambera emphasized that since becoming bishop in 2010, he had pursued a zero-tolerance policy toward clerical abuse.

Bambera announced in October 2024 that Martin Boylan, a diocesan priest, had been laicized by the Vatican. The diocese had removed him from public ministry in 2016 after receiving a credible allegation of child sexual abuse. Claims from four other victims soon followed. Bambera remarked;

“No one should ever have to endure such trauma, and it is our responsibility to ensure that all survivors are heard, supported, and empowered to heal.”

Bambera serves as the chair of the United States Conference of Catholic Bishops’ Committee on Ecumenical and Interreligious Affairs.

== See also ==
- Catholic Church hierarchy
- Catholic Church in the United States
- Historical list of the Catholic bishops of the United States
- List of Catholic bishops of the United States
- Lists of patriarchs, archbishops, and bishops

== Episcopal succession ==
Catholic Church titles
Preceded by Joseph Francis Martino	Bishop of Scranton; 2010-Present	Incumbent
