= Williams School =

Williams School may refer to any of a number of schools.

in the United States

- Williams School (Connecticut), New London, Connecticut, a coeducational independent high school located on the campus of Connecticut College.
- Williams Grove School, Angier, North Carolina
- Williams School (Cameron, Oklahoma)
- Roger Williams Public School No. 10, Scranton, Pennsylvania
- Williams Creek School (Gillespie County, Texas), Stonewall, Texas
- Peabody Building of the Peabody-Williams School, Petersburg, Virginia
- Williams School, the 4-12 school at the Oakley Youth Development Center in Hinds County, Mississippi
