= Holy Cross High School (Pennsylvania) =

Private coed. high school in Dunmore, Pennsylvania, United States

Location
- 501 East Drinker Street; Dunmore, (Lackawanna County), Pennsylvania 18512; United States; 41°25′16.5″N 75°37′22.5″W

Information
- Type: Private coed. high school
- Religious affiliation: Roman Catholic
- Established: 2007
- Superintendent: Msgr. David Tressler
- Dean: Mrs. Kandy Taylor
- Administrator: Msgr. David Tressler
- Principal: Mr. Ben Tolerico
- Chaplain: Father Cyril Edwards
- Faculty: 61
- Grades: 9-12
- Average class size: 18
- Student to teacher ratio: 12:1
- Campus type: Urban
- Colors: Silver; Forest Green; Black
- Fight song: "Holy Cross stand true"
- Athletics conference: Pennsylvania Interscholastic Athletic Association (PIAA) (A/AA)
- Team name: Crusaders
- Rivals: Dunmore High School, Scranton Preparatory School, Holy Redeemer High School and Mid Valley Secondary Center
- Accreditation: Middle States Association of Colleges and Schools
- Tuition: $8,550 (2024-2025)
- Affiliation: Diocese of Scranton
- Director of Religious Formation: Mr. Jack Rubano
- Bishop of Scranton: Joseph C. Bambera
- Website: hchspa.org

Holy Cross High School is a Roman Catholic secondary school located in Dunmore, Pennsylvania. It operates under the jurisdiction of the Roman Catholic Diocese of Scranton, and is the second largest of four diocesan high schools in Northeastern Pennsylvania. The Holy Cross School System has included five feeder schools since the 2011-2012 school year: All Saints Academy, Scranton; LaSalle Academy, Jessup; Our Lady of Peace, Clarks Summit; St. Clare/St. Paul, Scranton; and St. Mary of Mount Carmel, Dunmore.

== History ==
=== 20th century ===
In 1964, Central Dunmore Catholic High School was built at the school’s current location by the efforts of the five Catholic parishes within Dunmore to serve as centralized, larger secondary school than individual parish centers. In later years, the school was renamed Bishop O’Hara High School to commemorate the first bishop of Scranton, William O’Hara, and to reach out to Catholic students outside of Dunmore. In the 1960s Cathedral High School was built in Scranton to serve Catholic students at the secondary level in the central city. In later years, it was renamed Bishop Hannan High School] to commemorate the fifth bishop of Scranton, Jerome Hannan, and as it absorbed other Catholic high schools within Scranton, and to reach out to Catholic students outside of Scranton.

Due to changing demographics and culture, the enrollment of Bishop Hannan and Bishop O’Hara declined through the 1990s and 2000s. Foreseeing an eventual demise of Catholic education, the ninth bishop of Scranton, Francis Martino, hired the Meitler Consultants to conduct a diocesan-wide study of the Catholic schools and submit recommendations for the renewal and strengthening of the Diocese’s schools.

=== 21st century ===
In early 2007, the Meitler Consultants recommended that the equally sized Bishops Hannan and O’Hara merge to form a new high school to serve all of Lackawanna County.

In 2007, Bishop O’Hara and Bishop Hannan graduated their last classes, and the schools were closed. Holy Cross High School was then formed, which operated in the O’Hara building as the Dunmore Campus and in the Hannan building as the Scranton Campus. The Dunmore and Scranton Campuses retained the upperclassmen of the original schools, and all of the freshmen attended the Dunmore Campus. For the 2008-2009 school year onward, the Scranton Campus was closed, several modular classrooms were added on to the Dunmore Campus, and Holy Cross High School was physically united.

Holy Cross High School enrolled 507 students in the 2015-2016 school year. The current student-to-teacher ratio is 18:1. Holy Cross has an academic curriculum that includes four years of Latin, Spanish, and French. All students are required to take four years of Theology, English, Mathematics, Physical and Natural Sciences, and Social Studies. Holy Cross offers a variety of Advanced Placement classes and many electives in Fine Arts, Computer Science, and Humanities.

Since the 2011-2012 school year, the I.H.M. Scholarship Program has been in effect, where interested students can attend part of the school day at Marywood University to take advanced classes. Holy Cross High School has an annual theatrical performance and art show. Holy Cross High School offers twenty-two extra-curricular clubs and twenty-five sporting activities.

== School activities ==
Holy Cross performs a yearly school musical. Bishop O'Hara was known for its theater department and produced many actors and singers, including Broadway performer Judy McLane. The school offers many other extracurricular activities.

On March 30, 2019, Holy Cross won its first Mock Trial State Championship defeating Germantown Friends School at the Dauphin County Courthouse in Harrisburg, PA. This was the first state title for the program. The team then went on to place 9th in the 2019 National High School Mock Trial Competition in Athens, GA as the representatives from Pennsylvania.

== Athletics ==
The boys varsity basketball team captured the 2008 District 2 PIAA championship in its first appearance since Hannan and O'Hara combined to form Holy Cross. Previously, the Bishop Hannan Golden Lancers boys varsity basketball team won the PIAA state championship in 2002 and went to the state championship in 2006, where it was defeated by Elk County Catholic High School. Also, in 2013 the Crusaders went to Hershey in the State Championship game for basketball but finished overall #2 in the state of Pennsylvania in Class AA. They won most years in districts for PA District II in its existence.

=== State championships ===
In 1990, Mark McLafferty won the 160lb PIAA class AA state wrestling championship for Bishop O'Hara, capping an undefeated season at 35-0 and becoming the first state wrestling champion from the Lackawanna League. Joining him in Hershey was Jason Kobrynich who placed 5th at 119lbs. Together they garnered a fifth-place team finish in the AA standings. The head coach was Lackawanna County sports hall of fame inductee Jerry Coyne.

In 2001, The Bishop O'Hara Lady Bruins won the PIAA softball state championship by defeating Sto Rox 3-1. The lady Bruins were coached by softball hall of famer John XE McAndrew. *In the spring of 2002 Bishop Hannan High School (The previous name of one of the two high schools that merged with Holy Cross) won the PIAA state championship against Sto-Rox High School. This Bishop Hannan Golden Lancers team was led by Syracuse University former point guard Gerry McNamara who had won the NCAA national championship just a few years later. The head coach was John Bucci.

- In 2012, Rico Galassi became Holy Cross' first individual state champion, securing the PIAA Class A state title in cross country with a time of 15:59 on a 3.1 mile course.
- In 2013, Holy Cross' varsity boys' basketball team advanced to the PIAA Class AA Championship game against Beaver Falls at the Giant Center in Hershey, Pennsylvania. Holy Cross ended up losing to Beaver Falls, 69-63. The head coach was Al Callejas.
- In the spring of 2013, Rico Galassi obtained his second state title at the 2013 PIAA Track and Field State Championship Meet. He won the men's AA 3200 meter race with a winning time of 9:12.48.
- In the fall of 2013, Holy Cross' varsity girls' cross country team became the first team in Holy Cross' history to win a state title, beating Elk Lake in the PIAA Class A State Championship Meet 64-99.
- In the Spring of 2024, Holy Cross' varsity boys' basketball team, led by Matthew Kennedy of Scranton, advanced to the PIAA Class AA Championship game against Aliquippa at the Giant center in Hershey, Pennsylvania. Holy Cross ended up losing, 74-52.The head coach was Al Callejas Jr.

=== Notable alumni ===
- Gerry McNamara, retired American basketball player; helped capture Syracuse University's first ever National Championship in 2003; current head men's basketball coach at Siena College
- Ivan Provorov, current NHL ice hockey player for the Philadelphia Flyers.
