= Jerome Hannan =

American prelate

His Excellency, The Most Reverend Jerome Daniel Hannan
- Bishop of Scranton
- Church: Roman Catholic Church
- See: Diocese of Scranton
- Elected: August 17, 1954
- Predecessor: William Joseph Hafey
- Successor: Joseph Carroll McCormick

Orders
- Ordination: May 22, 1921 by Regis Canevin
- Consecration: September 21, 1954 by Amleto Cicognani

Personal details
- Born: November 29, 1896 Pittsburgh, Pennsylvania, US
- Died: December 15, 1965 (aged 69) Rome, Italy
- Education: Duquesne University; St. Vincent's Seminary; Catholic University of America
- Motto: Ut custodiam legam tuum (To keep your legacy)

Styles of Jerome Daniel Hannan
- Reference style: The Most Reverend
- Spoken style: Your Excellency
- Religious style: Monsignor
- Posthumous style: None

Jerome Daniel Hannan (November 29, 1896 – December 15, 1965) was an American prelate of the Roman Catholic Church. He served as bishop of the Diocese of Scranton in Pennsylvania from 1954 until his death in 1965.

== Biography ==
=== Early life ===
Jerome Hannan was born on November 29, 1896, in Pittsburgh, Pennsylvania, to James and Rose (née Tiernan) Hannan. He studied at Duquesne University in Pittsburgh, where he obtained a Bachelor of Arts degree in 1916. Deciding to become a priest, Hannan entered St. Vincent's Seminary in Latrobe, Pennsylvania, earning a Doctor of Divinity degree in 1920.

=== Priesthood ===
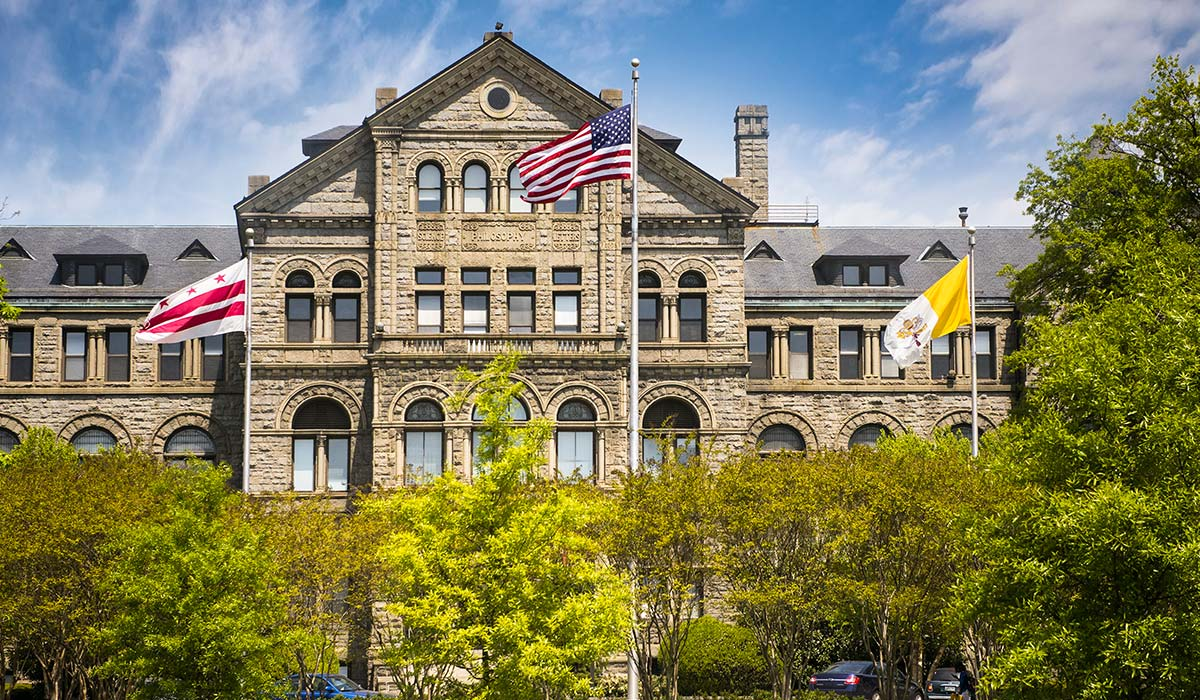
Catholic University of America, Washington, D.C. (2019)

Hannan was ordained to the priesthood by Archbishop Regis Canevin for the Diocese of Pittsburgh on May 22, 1921. After his ordination, the diocese assigned Hannan as administrator of Holy Trinity Parish in McKeesport, Pennsylvania, and curate at Holy Rosary Parish in Pittsburgh. In 1923, he became chaplain at Mount Mercy Academy in Pittsburgh. Hannan also served private secretary to Bishop Hugh Charles Boyle from 1923 to 1931.

Hannan earned a Bachelor of Laws degree from Duquesne in 1931, and a Doctor of Canon Law degree from the School of Canon Law at Catholic University of America in Washington, D.C. in 1934. He was named assistant chancellor of the diocese in 1934 and additionally administrator of St. Paul's Cathedral Parish in Pittsburgh in 1937.

Hannan left his positions in Pittsburgh to move in 1940 to Washington, where he joined the faculty of Catholic University as an associate professor of canon law. In 1951, Hannan was named vice-rector of the University. He also served as editor of the journal The Jurist: Studies in Church Law and Ministry.

=== Bishop of Scranton ===
On August 17, 1954, Hannan was appointed the fifth bishop of Scranton by Pope Pius XII. He received his episcopal consecration on September 21, 1954, from Archbishop Amleto Cicognani, with Archbishop Patrick O'Boyle and Bishop Henry Klonowski serving as co-consecrators, in Washington. During his tenure, Hannan oversaw the construction of the chancery building and Saint Pius X Seminary.

=== Death and legacy ===
Jerome Hannan died in Rome on December 15, 1965, where he was attending the closing session of the Second Vatican Council; he was age 69.

In 2018, the University of Scranton renamed Hannan Hall after a Pennsylvania grand jury determined that he covered up child sex abuse by clergy in the diocese.

Catholic Church titles
| Preceded by William Joseph Hafey | Bishop of Scranton; 1954–1965 | Succeeded by Joseph Carroll McCormick |
