= Henry Klonowski =

Catholic bishop (1898–1977)

Most Reverend Henry Klonowski
- Auxiliary Bishop of Scranton
- Church: Catholic Church
- See: Titular See of Daldis
- Appointed: May 10, 1947
- In office: July 2, 1947 - May 15, 1973

Orders
- Ordination: August 8, 1920
- Consecration: July 2, 1947 by William Joseph Hafey

Personal details
- Born: March 8, 1898 Scranton, Pennsylvania
- Died: May 6, 1977 (aged 79) Scranton, Pennsylvania

Henry Klonowski (March 8, 1898 – May 6, 1977) was a bishop of the Catholic Church in the United States. He served as auxiliary bishop of the Diocese of Scranton from 1947 to 1973.

== Biography ==
Born in Scranton, Pennsylvania, Klonowski was ordained a priest on August 8, 1920, for the Diocese of Scranton. On May 10, 1947, Pope Pius XII appointed him as the Titular Bishop of Daldis and Auxiliary Bishop of Scranton. He was consecrated a bishop by Bishop William Hafey on July 2, 1947. The principal co-consecrators were Bishops George Leech of Harrisburg and Auxiliary Bishop Stephen Woznicki of Detroit. Klonowski attended the first session of the Second Vatican Council as a council father. He served as an auxiliary bishop until his resignation was accepted on May 15, 1973. He died on May 6, 1977, at the age of 79.

Catholic Church titles
Preceded by –	Auxiliary Bishop of Scranton; 1947–1973	Succeeded by –
