= Bishop Hoban High School =

Catholic high school in Pennsylvania, US (1971-2007)

- Wilkes-Barre, Pennsylvania; United States

Information
- Religious affiliation: Catholicism
- Established: 1971
- Closed: July 1, 2007
- Staff: c. 60
- Grades: 9-12
- Enrollment: c. 650
- Colors: Green and gold
- Affiliation: Roman Catholic Diocese of Scranton

Bishop Hoban High School was a Roman Catholic high school of the Diocese of Scranton, located in Wilkes-Barre, Pennsylvania. The school was founded in 1971, and the new building opened in 1972 after repairs due to the catastrophic flooding caused by Hurricane Agnes. The school was named after Most Rev. Michael J. Hoban, second Bishop of Scranton (1899–1926). Bishop Hoban's colors were green and gold, and the school's nickname was the Argents.

The last graduating class of Bishop Hoban graduated on May 24, 2007. Bishop Hoban High School closed on July 1, 2007, and became part of a consolidation of the four diocesan high schools of Luzerne County (see below). The building now houses Holy Redeemer High School.

The largest high school of the Diocese of Scranton, Bishop Hoban had an annual enrollment of around 650 (grades 9 through 12) with nearly 60 faculty and administrators. The school was accredited by the Middle States Association of Colleges and Schools.

== Academics ==
The curriculum required four years of English and Theology, one year of Western Civilization, two years of American History, three years of Natural Science, three years of Mathematics, two years of a modern or classical language, and a physical education course each year. Many electives were also offered, such as art and music (several), Journalism, QBASIC, C++ Programming, Law Education, Accounting, Survey of Dramatic Literature, Environmental Science, and Statistics. Many AP courses were offered, in subjects such as English Literature, American History, American Government, Chemistry, Java Programming, Psychology, and Studio Art. Bishop Hoban maintained a cooperative agreement with Wilkes University to allow interested, qualified students to pursue college-level Calculus courses there during their senior year. The school's drama program was also popular with musicals under the direction of Timothy Day, and Paul Winarski over the years, and a stage workshop run by Rev. Joseph Gilbert.

A large portion of the faculty held master's degrees in their fields; one faculty member held a doctorate.

== End of the Bishop Hoban Era ==
On January 17, 2007, the Diocese of Scranton announced that Bishop Hoban would consolidate with three other Catholic high schools in Luzerne County (Bishop Hafey, Bishop O'Reilly, and Seton Catholic), effective July 1, 2007. . The Bishop Hoban building is now used as the new school, Holy Redeemer High School (announced by the Diocese January 30) . This plan was originally proposed by Meitler Consultants, Inc., of Wisconsin in late 2006.

On February 27, 2007, the Scranton Diocese announced that Holy Redeemer would be led by Mr. James J. Redington, Principal, and Ms. Susan W. Dennen, Associate Principal . At that time, Mr. Redington was the principal of Seton Catholic and Ms. Dennen served in that role at Bishop O'Reilly. Holy Redeemer's colors are red, white, and gold, and the school nickname is the Royals. After the course registration process was completed, a list of faculty who had been chosen to teach at the new school was also released.

Bishop Hoban's final Mass was held on May 31, 2007, and was attended by alumni and former principals Msgr. Tressler and Mr. Majikes. Msgr. Joseph Rauscher, President of the Board of Pastors, presided and gave the homily, in which he encouraged the students to look forward to the future and to take what Hoban had taught them and bring it to the world. The ceremony also included presentations of symbols to remind the students of the Hoban legacy and concluded with the final public singing of the Alma Mater.

== 2006-07 Administration ==
- Rev. Michael Jenkins, C.S.C., Principal
- Mrs. Anne Thomas, Vice Principal
- Mr. Michael D. Booth, Dean of Students
- Mr. James McDermott, Director of Religious Formation
- Sr. Catherine Morris, Ss. C.M., Director of Guidance
- Mr. James Higgins, Director of Athletics
- Msgr. Joseph Rauscher, President of the Board of Pastors

== Principals of Bishop Hoban High School ==
- Rev. Gerald J. Burns (1971–1982)
- Rev. John W. Jordan (1982–1985)
- Rev. Dominick J. Lorenzetti (1985–1990)
- Mr. Frank Majikes (1990–1998)
- Msgr. David L. Tressler (1998–2004)
- Sr. Ellen Maroney, I.H.M. (acting, 2004)
- Rev. Michael E. Jenkins, C.S.C. (2004–2007)
