= St. John the Evangelist Roman Catholic Church and School Building =

Historic church in Pennsylvania, United States

- U.S. National Register of Historic Places
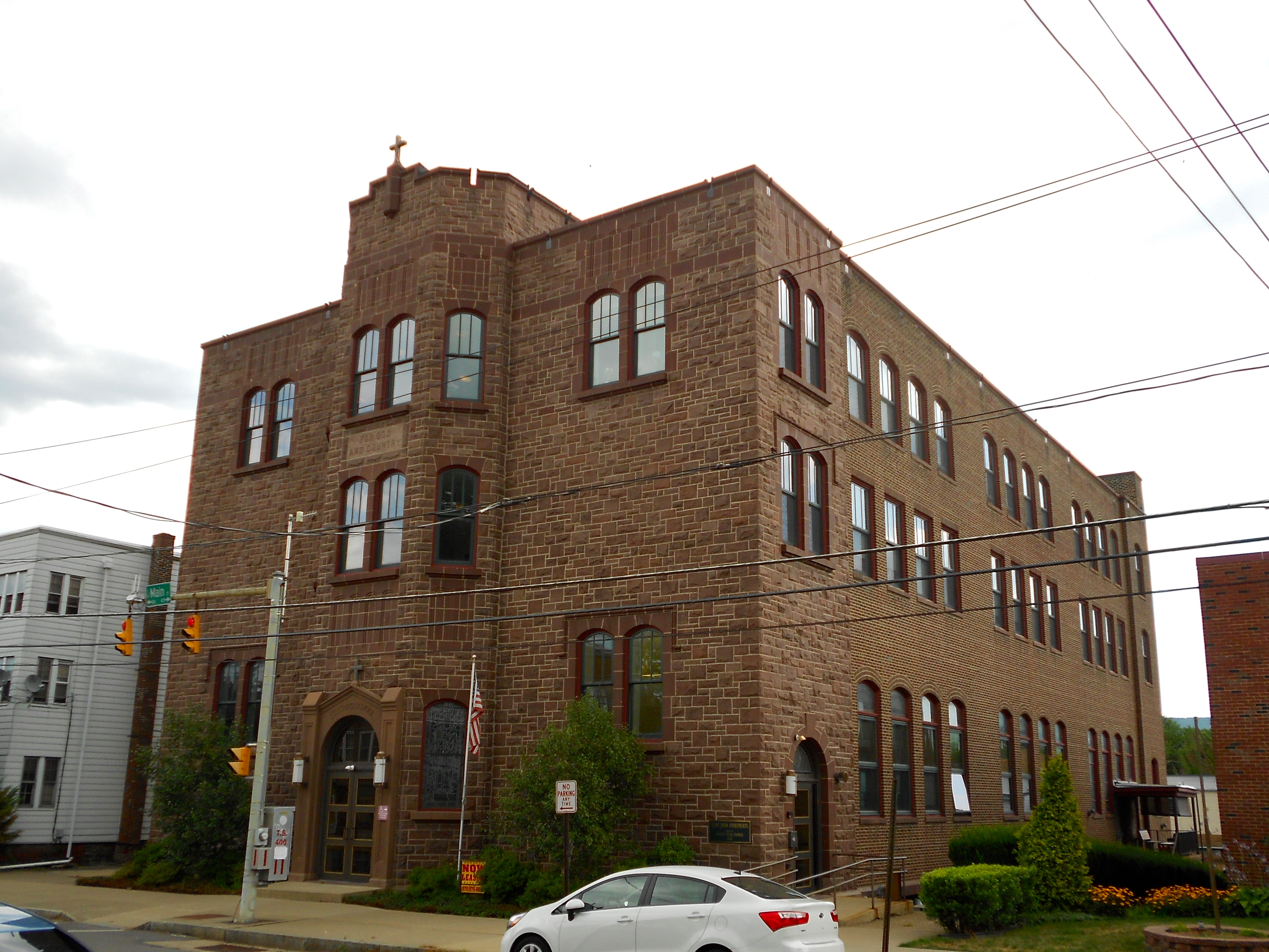
- Apartment building in 2013

- Location within Pennsylvania Location within the United States
- Location: 419 N. Main St., Wilkes-Barre, Pennsylvania
- Coordinates: 41°15′29″N 75°52′3″W
- Area: less than one acre
- Built: 1929
- Architect: Howley, John J.; Cuppels, Frank J.
- NRHP reference No.: 03000721
- Added to NRHP: July 30, 2003

St. John the Evangelist Roman Catholic Church and School Building is a historic former Roman Catholic church and school building at 419 N. Main Street in Wilkes-Barre, Luzerne County, Pennsylvania within the Diocese of Scranton.

It was added to the National Register of Historic Places in 2003.

== Description ==
It was built in 1929, and is a three-story, red brick and cut stone building. It has a three bay front and measures 63 feet, 6 inches, wide and 124 feet, 2 inches deep. The school closed in 1971, and parish in 1994. Between 2000 and 2003, the building was renovated into 24 one-bedroom apartments.
