= Bishop Hafey High School =

- Hazleton, Pennsylvania 18201; United States

Information
- Type: Private, Coeducational
- Motto: Where There Is Love, There Is God
- Religious affiliation: Roman Catholic
- Established: 1971
- Closed: 2007
- Grades: 7-12
- Colors: Gold and White
- Mascot: Viking
- Team name: Vikings
- Newspaper: Golden Gazette

Bishop Hafey High School was a Roman Catholic high school of the Diocese of Scranton, located in Hazleton, Pennsylvania. By order of Bishop Martino, the high school was closed in June 2007. The school's mascot was the Viking. The school's colors were gold and white.

== History ==
Bishop Hafey High School was constructed in the 1960s in the Maple Manor section of Hazleton, between PA State Route 93 and PA State Route 309. The school was the replacement to the first Catholic high school in the Hazleton area, which was St. Gabriel's. The school was recommended for closure in 2006 by Meitler Consulting, who was retained by the Diocese of Scranton to study the school's feasibility. Bishop Joseph Martino ordered the school to be closed at the end of the 2006–2007 academic year. In July 2007, Bishop Hafey was consolidated with the three other diocesan high schools in Luzerne County (Bishop Hoban, Bishop O'Reilly, and Seton Catholic into Holy Redeemer High School, located at the former Bishop Hoban site).

In August 2007, the building reopened as Holy Family Academy. But on April 26, 2011, due to the decreased number of enrolled students in Holy Family and high-maintenance costs at the building, Bishop Bambera told parents that Holy Family Academy would move from the Bishop Hafey High School building into the former St. Joseph's Memorial School in Hazleton. (The relocated Holy Family Academy is the only remaining Roman Catholic school in the Hazleton area.)

In September 2011, the Diocese of Scranton sold the Bishop Hafey building and its property to the Hazleton Area School District for $5.5 million. HASD directors announced that the building would become "Maple Manor Elementary / Middle School", a kindergarten through eighth grade school. On April 30, 2012, the Diocese of Scranton officially transferred ownership of the Bishop Hafey building and its property to the Hazleton Area School District. On February 23, 2013, the remaining contents of Bishop Hafey were sold at auction.

== Facilities ==
The two-story brick high school's entrance is covered with a metal canopy. The combined cafeteria/auditorium includes a stage. The property also includes football, soccer and baseball fields, along with parking lots.

== Athletics ==
Banners in the Bishop Hafey gymnasium.

Bishop Hafey High School athletic program included the following sports:

- Boys and Girls Cross Country
- Boys and Girls Soccer
- Football
- Boys and Girls Tennis
- Boys and Girls Basketball
- Baseball
- Softball
- Golf
- Boys and Girls Track and Field (through Hazleton Area High School)

Points of Athletic Note and Achievement:

- The boys cross country team has been undefeated in the Wyoming Valley conference since 1995. The boys and girls team have won the conference championship every year since 1994. The boys team won the Pennsylvania AA State Championship in 1999.
- Former Bishop Hafey basketball standout power forward, John Mahasky, was inducted to the Hazleton Area Sports Hall of Fame Class of 2015. John finished his basketball career with 1,351 points and went on to play college basketball for Wilkes University.
- The men's 1974-1975 varsity basketball team won the Anthracite League and District 11 Class B championships finishing with a 27–1 record. Team members included: Joe Koval, Mark Molino, Joe Petruce, Rick Marshall, Rich Scarcella, John Cannon, Tom Truitt, Mike Pavlica, Mike Kaschak, Neale Trangucci, Larry Krizansky, Larry Sock, Bob Properi. The head coach was Cy Fulton and the assistant coach was Bob Stefanovich.
