= Roger Williams Public School No. 10 =

- U.S. National Register of Historic Places
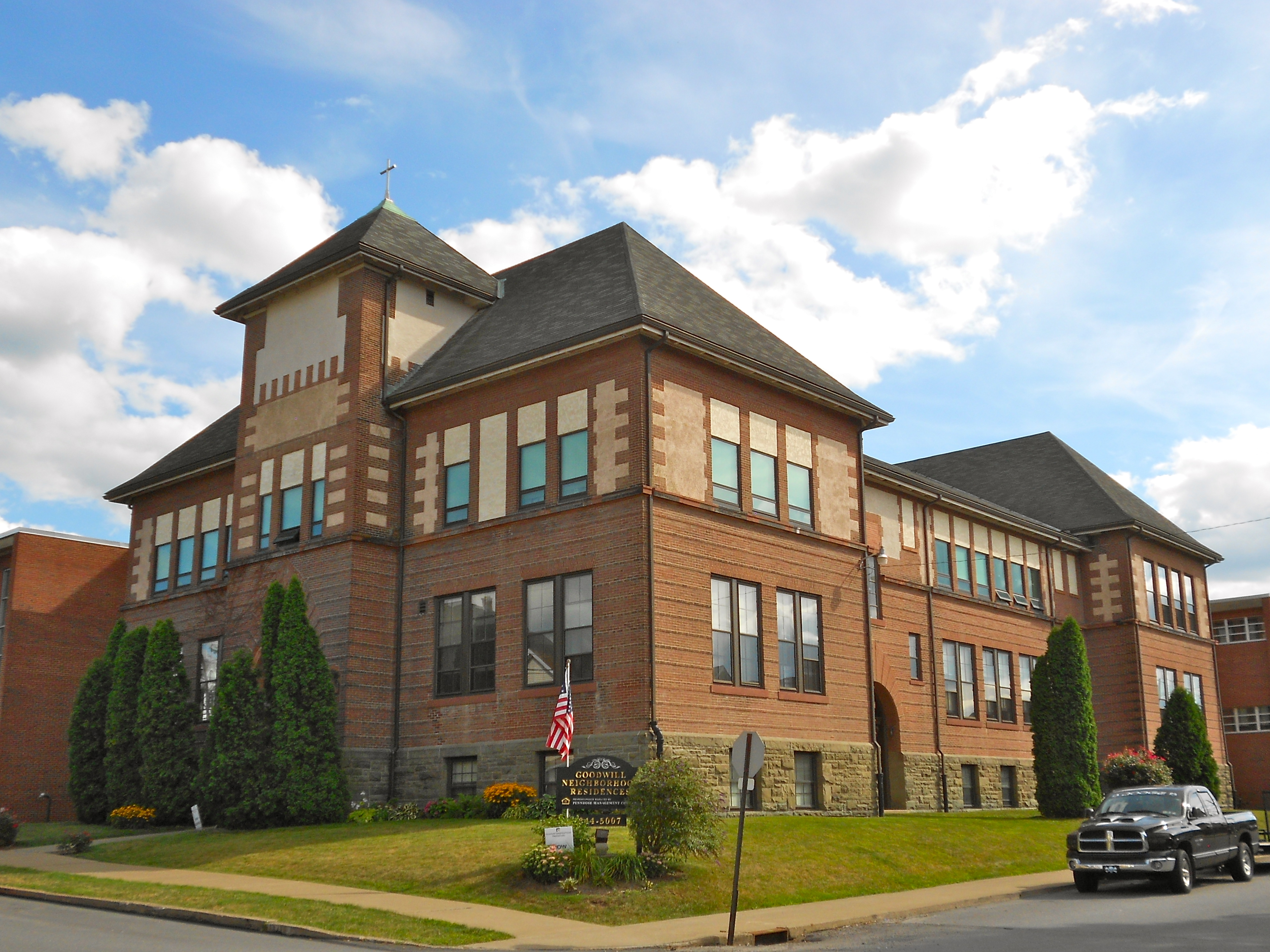
- The school building in 2013

- Location within Pennsylvania Location within the United States
- Map showing the location of Roger Williams Public School No. 10
- Location: 901 Prospect Ave., Scranton, Pennsylvania
- Coordinates: 41°23′43″N 75°39′58″W
- Area: 1 acre (0.40 ha)
- Built: c. 1896
- Architectural style: Late 19th And 20th Century Revivals, Late Victorian
- NRHP reference No.: 97000520
- Added to NRHP: June 13, 1997

Roger Williams Public School No. 10, also known as South Scranton Catholic High School, is a historic school building located at Scranton, Lackawanna County, Pennsylvania.

It was added to the National Register of Historic Places in 1997.

== Description ==
It was built about 1896, and is a two-story, I-shaped brick and sandstone building in a Late Victorian style. It features a central three-story entrance tower with a hipped roof. A two-story brick addition was built in 1965.

The public school was closed in 1941, and subsequently acquired by the Roman Catholic Diocese of Scranton for use as a consolidated Catholic high school. It was renamed in 1973, as Bishop Klonowski High School, and closed in 1982.

The property was acquired by Lackawanna Junior College in 1982. In 2012, Goodwill Industries established an assisted housing complex in the building.
