= Thomas Charles O'Reilly =

American Catholic prelate (1873–1938)

His Excellency, The Most Reverend Thomas Charles O'Reilly
- Bishop of Scranton
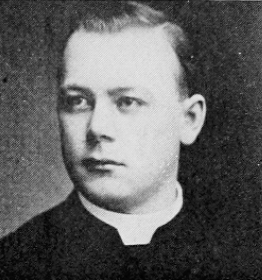
- Church: Catholic Church; Latin Church
- Diocese: Scranton
- Installed: December 16, 1927
- Term ended: March 25, 1938
- Predecessor: Michael John Hoban
- Successor: William Joseph Hafey

Orders
- Ordination: June 4, 1898 by Francesco di Paola Cassetta
- Consecration: February 16, 1928 by Dennis Joseph Dougherty with Joseph Schrembs and Bernard Joseph Mahoney (co-consecrators)

Personal details
- Born: February 22, 1873 Cleveland, Ohio, US
- Died: March 25, 1938 (aged 65) Miami Beach, Florida, US
- Education: Pontifical North American College; Propaganda University; University of Notre Dame
- Motto: Pelut timorem caritas (Love drives away fear)

Thomas Charles O'Reilly (February 22, 1873 – March 25, 1938) was an American prelate of the Catholic Church who served as bishop of the Diocese of Scranton in Pennsylvania from 1928 to 1938.

== Biography ==
=== Early life ===
O'Reilly was born on February 22, 1873, in Cleveland, Ohio, to Patrick and Delia (née Readdy) O'Reilly. In 1887, O'Reilly enrolled at the Spencerian Business College in Cleveland. One year later, he transferred to St. Ignatius College in Cleveland. After graduating from St. Ignatius in 1893, O'Reilly decided to enter the priesthood. He then went that year to St. Mary's Seminary in Cleveland . The diocese in 1894 sent him to reside at the Pontifical North American College while studying in Rome.

=== Priesthood ===
O'Reilly was ordained to the priesthood for the Diocese of Cleveland by Cardinal Francesco di Paola Cassetta on June 4, 1898. In 1899, he earned a Doctor of Sacred Theology degree from the Propaganda University in Rome

Upon returning to Ohio, the diocese assigned O'Reilly as a curate at St. John's Cathedral Parish. In 1901, he was named a professor of dogmatic theology at St. Mary's Seminary. He earned a Doctor of Laws in 1909 from the University of Notre Dame in Indiana. After finishing at Notre Dame, O'Reilly was named chancellor of the diocese in 1909. In 1916, he was appointed vicar general. He left his position as vicar general in 1921 to become pastor of the Cathedral of St. John the Evangelist Parish.

=== Bishop of Scranton ===
On December 16, 1927, O'Reilly was appointed the third bishop of Scranton by Pope Pius XI. He received his episcopal consecration on February 16, 1928 from Cardinal Dennis Joseph Dougherty, with Bishops Joseph Schrembs and Bernard Joseph Mahoney serving as co-consecrators. During his tenure, he established seven parishes and fourteen schools in the diocese, despite the economic ravages of the 1930s Great Depression.

However, the increased burden of responsibility took its toll on his health, and his tenure was correspondingly shortened. O'Reilly died on March 25, 1938, in Miami Beach, Florida, at age 65.

== See also ==
- Catholic Church in the United States
- Hierarchy of the Catholic Church
- Historical list of the Catholic bishops of the United States
- List of Catholic bishops in the United States
- Lists of popes, patriarchs, primates, archbishops, and bishops

Catholic Church titles
Preceded by Michael John Hoban	Bishop of Scranton; 1928–1938	Succeeded by William Joseph Hafey
