= William Hafey =

American prelate

His Excellency, The Most Reverend William Joseph Hafey
- Bishop of Scranton; Titular Bishop of Appia
- See: Diocese of Scranton
- Predecessor: Thomas Charles O'Reilly
- Successor: Jerome Daniel Hannan
- Previous posts: Bishop of Raleigh (1925 to 1937)

Orders
- Ordination: June 16, 1914 by Owen Patrick Bernard Corrigan
- Consecration: June 24, 1925 by Michael Joseph Curley

Personal details
- Born: March 19, 1888 Chicopee, Massachusetts, U.S.
- Died: May 12, 1954 (aged 66) Scranton, Pennsylvania, U.S.
- Denomination: Roman Catholic
- Education: College of the Holy Cross (AB); Georgetown University; Mount St. Mary's University
- Motto: Emitte spiritum tuum (Send forth thy spirit)

William Joseph Hafey (March 19, 1888 – May 12, 1954) was an American prelate of the Roman Catholic Church who served as bishop of the Diocese of Raleigh in North Carolina (1925–1937) and bishop of the Diocese of Scranton in Pennsylvania (1938–1954).

== Biography ==
=== Early life ===
William Hafey was born on March 19, 1888, in Chicopee, Massachusetts, to James and Catherine (née Mulcahy) Hafey. He attended the College of the Holy Cross in Worcester, Massachusetts, where he obtained a Bachelor of Arts degree in 1909. From 1909 to 1910, he studied at Georgetown University Law Center in Washington, D.C., then attended Mount St. Mary's Seminary in Emmitsburg, Maryland.

=== Priesthood ===
Hafey was ordained to the priesthood at Mount St. Mary's by Bishop Owen Corrigan for the Archdiocese of Baltimore on June 16, 1914. After his ordination, the archdiocese assigned Hafey served as a curate at St. Joseph's Parish in Baltimore. In 1920, he was appointed chancellor of the archdiocese.

=== Bishop of Raleigh ===
On April 6, 1925, Hafey was appointed the first bishop of Raleigh by Pope Pius XI. He received his episcopal consecration on June 24, 1925, from Archbishop Michael Curley at the National Shrine of the Assumption of the Blessed Virgin Mary in Baltimore, Maryland. Bishops Thomas O'Leary and Michael Keyes served as co-consecrators.

=== Coadjutor Bishop and Bishop of Scranton ===
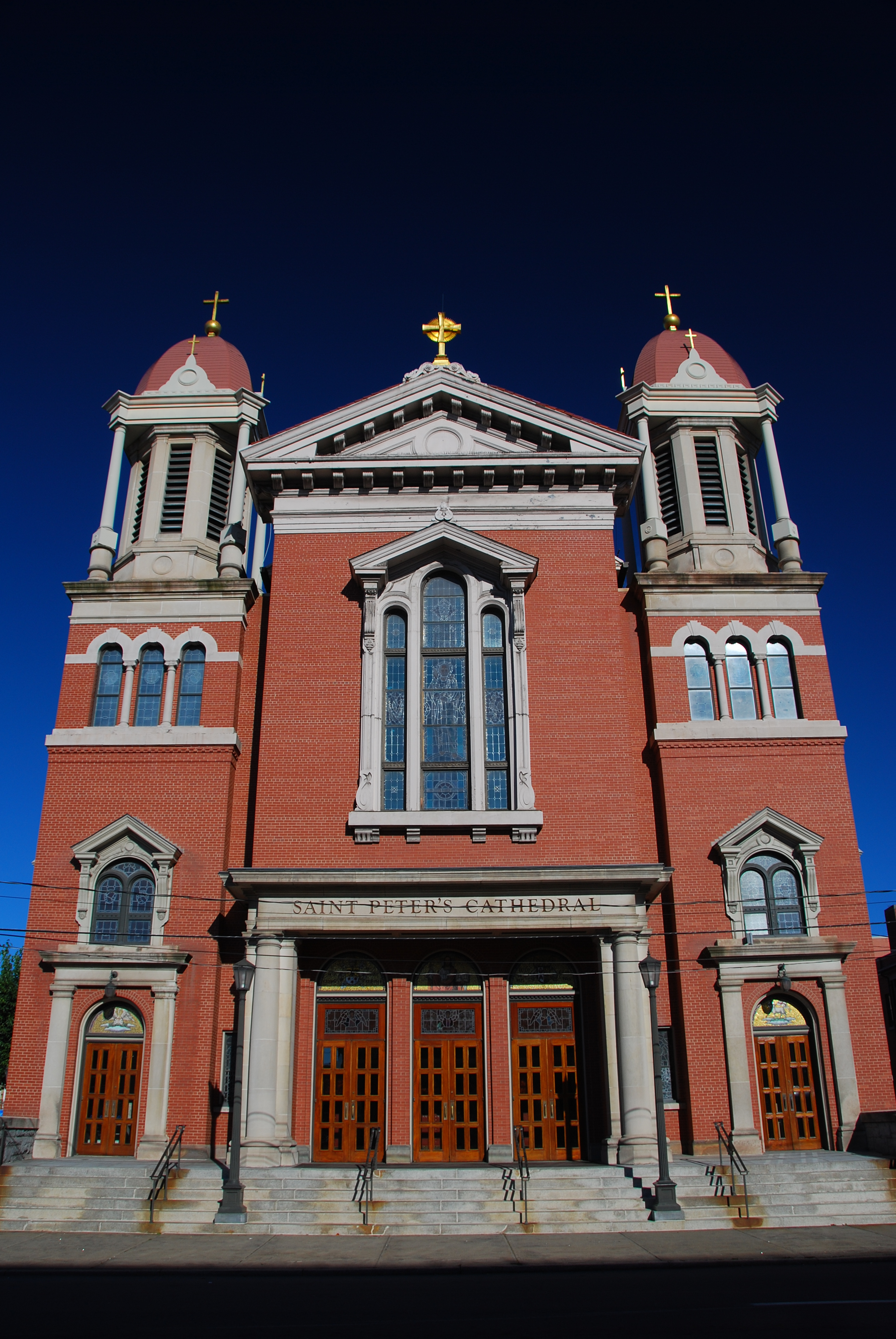
Cathedral of St. Peter, Scranton, Pennsylvania (2019)

Hafey was named coadjutor bishop of Scranton and titular bishop of Appia on October 2, 1937 by Pius IX. Haley automatically succeeded Bishop Thomas O'Reilly as the fourth bishop of Scranton on March 25, 1938. Hafey created new parishes, multiplied the number of buildings, and increased the number of priests and religious. He was also dedicated to social needs such as education, healthcare, and youth activities.

=== Death and legacy ===
William Hafey died in Scranton, Pennsylvania, on May 12, 1954, at age 66.The following were named after Hafey

- Bishop Hafey High School in Hazelton, Pennsylvania
- Knights of Columbus Bishop Hafey Council 4507 of High Point, North Carolina
- Hafey Hall at the University of Scranton.

== See also ==
- Catholic Church hierarchy
- Catholic Church in the United States
- Historical list of the Catholic bishops of the United States
- List of Catholic bishops of the United States
- Lists of patriarchs, archbishops, and bishops

Catholic Church titles
Preceded by Thomas Charles O'Reilly	Bishop of Scranton; 1938-1954	Succeeded by Jerome Daniel Hannan
New creation	Bishop of Raleigh; 1925-1937	Succeeded by Eugene J. McGuinness
