= Holy Redeemer High School =

School in Wilkes-Barre, Pennsylvania, United States

Location
- 159 South Pennsylvania Boulevard; Wilkes-Barre, Luzerne County, Pennsylvania 18701; United States; 41°14′29″N 75°53′3″W

Information
- Type: Private, Coeducational
- Motto: Omnia per Christum (All Things Through Christ)
- Religious affiliation: Roman Catholic
- Established: 2007
- Dean: Kellina Yarrish
- Principal: Colin Martinson
- Chaplain: Rev. Philbert Tekynaki
- Faculty: About 50
- Grades: 9-12
- Campus size: 3.4 acres
- Campus type: urban
- Colors: Red, White and Gold
- Team name: Royals
- Accreditation: Middle States Association of Colleges and Schools
- Website: holyredeemerhs.org

Holy Redeemer High School is a high school of the Roman Catholic Diocese of Scranton. It is located in Wilkes-Barre, Pennsylvania, United States. It is currently the only Catholic high school in Luzerne County.

== History ==
In January 2007, Bishop Joseph Martino announced the consolidation of four schools into a central Catholic high school for Luzerne County. On February 27, 2007, James J. Redington, then-principal of Seton Catholic High School in Pittston, was selected to be the first principal of the new Holy Redeemer High School.

The school opened on July 1, 2007. It is a consolidation of Bishop Hafey High School in Hazleton, Bishop Hoban High School in Wilkes-Barre, Bishop O'Reilly High School in Kingston, and Seton Catholic High School in Pittston. The school is housed in the former Bishop Hoban building. Holy Redeemer's team name is the Royals and its colors are red, white, and gold. Classes began in late August 2007. By fall of that year, its students and faculty had celebrated the first Opening Liturgy at St. Nicholas Church, the first Spirit Week, and the first Junior Ring Ceremony.

The school was not in session on February 28, 2008, because a majority of faculty members called in sick to protest the diocese's refusal to acknowledge a teachers' union. The following day, over 200 students conducted a walkout in support of the teachers and their position. The diocese did not accept the union's terms.

On April 29, 2008, the high school conducted their first official ceremony for the National Honor Society. Holy Redeemer's first prom and talent show were held in May 2008. Later that school year, the high school community celebrated their first senior awards ceremony and senior graduation.

In June 2010, the school's first principal, James Redington, retired. The assistant principal, Anita Sirak, succeeded him.

=== Principals of Holy Redeemer ===
	Principal	Term
1	James J. Redington	2007–2010
2	Anita M. Sirak	2010–2016
3	Michael Reese	2016–2019
4	Doreen Dougherty	2019–2023
5	Cody Opalka	2023–2024
6	Colin Martinson	2024–present

== Enrollment ==
Year	Population
2007	860 students
2017	635 students
2023	436 students

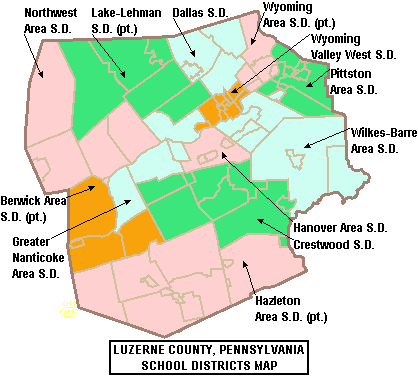
Holy Redeemer High School is located within Wilkes-Barre Area School District (seen in blue). It is currently the only Catholic high school in Luzerne County.

== Holy Redeemer School System ==
The coat of arms of the Diocese of Scranton

=== High school ===
- Holy Redeemer High School, Wilkes-Barre

=== Elementary schools ===
- Good Shepherd Academy, Kingston
- Holy Family Academy, Hazleton
- Holy Rosary Elementary School, Duryea
- Saint Nicholas/Saint Mary Elementary School, Wilkes-Barre
- Saint Jude Elementary School, Mountain Top
- Wyoming Area Catholic Elementary School, Exeter
