= St. John the Evangelist Parish =

Coordinates: 41°26′58″N 87°28′16″W

St. John the Evangelist Parish is a Roman Catholic church located in St. John, Indiana, United States. The Church was the first church in Lake County and was founded in 1839 by German immigrant John Hack. The present church has 1,335 families that belong to the parish. St. John the Evangelist Parish also has a private school called St. John the Evangelist School. The school contains grades pre-K through eight and has over 300 students enrolled.

== History ==
In 1839 John Hack and ten other families created St. John the Evangelist Parish. That same year the members built a log cabin on John Hack's land to celebrate mass in. In 1842 a dispute split the Parish, a few staying loyal to John Hack and the majority staying loyal to the priest. Due to the split many of the members wanted to build a new church to worship in. In 1844 many of the families built another log cabin with the help of the priest to celebrate mass in. In 1846 that Parish celebrated its first confirmation and Lake Counties first. Then in 1851 a brick church was built and parishioners numbered around 120 families. The new church was dedicated on October 20, 1856. That church stood until 1923, when the cornerstone for the fourth church was laid. The fourth church was completed and dedicated on September 27, 1925, by Bishop F. Noll of Ft. Wayne. This fourth church was used to celebrate mass in until 2008, when the fifth church was finished. The fifth church was dedicated on May 15, 2008, by Bishop Dale Melczek. The fifth church can hold up to 1,200 people and is 43,500 square feet (4,040 m^{2}).
