= Joseph Martino =

American prelate

His Excellency, The Most Reverend Joseph Francis Martino
- Bishop Emeritus of Scranton
- Diocese: Scranton
- Appointed: July 25, 2003
- Installed: October 1, 2003
- Retired: August 31, 2009
- Predecessor: James C. Timlin
- Successor: Joseph Bambera
- Previous post: Auxiliary Bishop of Philadelphia and Titular Bishop of Cellae in Mauretania (1996-2003)

Orders
- Ordination: December 18, 1970 by James Aloysius Hickey
- Consecration: March 11, 1996 by Anthony Bevilacqua, Francis B. Schulte, and Edward Peter Cullen

Personal details
- Born: May 1, 1946 (age 80) Philadelphia, Pennsylvania
- Denomination: Roman Catholic
- Education: St. Charles Borromeo Seminary; Pontifical Gregorian University
- Motto: Jesus the way, truth and life

Styles of Joseph Francis Martino
- Reference style: His Excellency; The Most Reverend
- Spoken style: Your Excellency
- Religious style: Bishop

Joseph Francis Martino (born May 1, 1946) is an American prelate of the Roman Catholic Church who served as bishop of the Diocese of Scranton in Pennsylvania from 2003 to 2009. He previously served as an auxiliary bishop of the Archdiocese of Philadelphia from 1996 to 2003.

== Biography ==
=== Early life ===
Joseph Francis Martino was born on May 1, 1946, in Philadelphia, Pennsylvania, to Joseph F. Martino Sr. and his wife Eleanor Devlin. He has a sister, Eleanor. He studied at Saint Joseph's Preparatory School in Philadelphia and at St. Charles Borromeo Seminary in the same city He then attended the Pontifical Gregorian University in Rome, where he obtained his doctorate in ecclesiastical history and Licentiate of Sacred Theology.

=== Priesthood ===
Martino was ordained to the priesthood for the Archdiocese of Philadelphia by Bishop James Hickey on December 18, 1970, in St. Peter’s Basilica in Rome. After returning to Pennsylvania, Martino worked as an assistant pastor in Philadelphia (1971–1975, 1987), Penndel, Pennsylvania (1975–1977), and Jenkintown, Pennsylvania (summers of 1977-1981). He taught at Bishop Shanahan High School in West Chester, Pennsylvania, from 1982 to 1984. Martino wrote the official document requesting the beatification of Sister Katharine Drexel.

From 1986 to 1992, Martino served as dean of formation in the Theology Division and assistant professor of church history at St. Charles Borromeo Seminary. The Vatican raised him to the rank of honorary prelate in 1991. Martino served as director of the archdiocesan Office for Ecumenical and Interreligious Affairs (1990–1993, 1997–2003) and for the Office for Renewal of Pastoral Life (1992–1997).

=== Auxiliary Bishop of Philadelphia ===
On January 24, 1996, Martino was appointed as an auxiliary bishop of Philadelphia and titular bishop of Cellae in Mauretania by Pope John Paul II. He was consecrated on March 11, 1996, by Cardinal Anthony Bevilacqua, with Archbishop Francis B. Schulte and Bishop Edward Cullen serving as co-consecrators, at the Basilica of Saints Peter and Paul in Philadelphia.

=== Bishop of Scranton ===
Martino was named as the ninth bishop of Scranton on July 5, 2003, by John Paul II. He was installed on October 1, 2003, at St. Peter's Cathedral in Scranton, Pennsylvania. In January 2007, Martino decided to close five Catholic high schools and 13 elementary schools. In January 2009, Martino announced that, due to a priest shortage and diminishing financial resources, the diocese would either close or consolidate almost half of its 209 parishes.

In 2008, Martino decertified the Scranton Diocese Association of Catholic Teachers, a teachers union that had functioned in the diocese for 30 years. He replaced it with a diocesan association of teachers. The head of the Association of Catholic Teachers described this new group as a "company union".

When the presidents of four Catholic universities and colleges in the diocese asked to meet with Martino, he demanded to first see the syllabi of all their courses on religion, faith and morals. The presidents refused this request, stating that their professors owned the syllabi.

=== Retirement ===
Martino submitted a letter of resignation as bishop of Scranton to Pope Benedict XVI in June 2009, citing his poor health. At that time, he was 63, below the mandatory retirement age of 75 for bishops. Martino said in his letter that he was suffering from "insomnia and crippling physical fatigue." He admitted that his stress derived from a “clear consensus among the clergy and the people of the diocese of Scranton regarding my pastoral initiatives or my method of governance.” According to a report in National Catholic Reporter, the apostolic nunicio to the United States had received numerous complaints about Martino's management style, his lack of consultation with others and his remoteness.

Martino's resignation was accepted by Benedict XVI on August 31, 2009. Monsignor Joseph C. Bambera was named on February 23, 2010, as Martino's replacement.

== Viewpoints ==
=== 2008 presidential election ===
During the 2008 presidential election, Martino issued a pastoral letter that declared "public officials who are Catholic and who persist in public support for abortion...should not partake in or be admitted to the sacrament of Holy Communion." This was particularly controversial since the Democratic vice presidential candidate, then Senator Joe Biden, is a native of Scranton. Martino confirmed that Biden would be refused communion should he tour the region. In October 2008, Martino made an unexpected appearance at a Catholic political forum in Honesdale, Pennsylvania, where he stated, "No USCCB document is relevant in this diocese ... There is one teacher in this diocese, and these points are not debatable."

=== Abortion ===
Following President Barack Obama's inauguration, Martino accused Senator Bob Casey (D-PA), a Catholic who opposes abortion, of "cooperating with...evil" by supporting Obama's repeal of the Mexico City Policy. This policy, reinstated when George W. Bush became president, prohibited federal funding for foreign family planning aid groups who offer abortion services to women. Martino declared that Casey's opposition to the Mexico City Policy "will mean the deaths of thousands of unborn children."

Casey contended that funding these family planning groups would reduce the number of abortions by promoting the use of artificial contraception and other methods to avoid unintended pregnancies. In response, Martino said, "I remind you that it is never permissible to use immoral means (e.g., artificial contraception) to achieve a good end." Martino explained his anti-abortion statements by saying, "I speak so forcefully about the right to life—the sanctity of life—from its beginning at conception to natural death, [so] that we not make ourselves God, the way Nazi Germany did."

=== LGBT ===
On February 17, 2009, Martino expressed his "absolute disapproval" of Misericordia University inviting Keith Boykin, a best-selling author and LGBTQ rights advocate, to speak at its annual dinner as part of Black History Month. Martino described Boykin's views as "disturbingly opposed" and "antithetical" to Catholic teaching, and stated that "Misericordia University in this instance is seriously failing in maintaining its Catholic identity." In response to Martino's comments, Misericordia insisted that it "is committed deeply to its Catholic mission. Inseparable from that mission is our identity as an academic institution where ideas and positions are explored critically and freely." Misercordia also noted that Boykin’s speech was not meant to be a forum for advocacy on a particular issue.

Also in February 2009, Martino condemned an upcoming production at Holy Redeemer High School in Wilkes-Barre, Pennsylvania, of the Eve Ensler play, The Vagina Monologues. The diocese threatened to fire two diocesan employees if they involved themselves in the production. A high school student was also threatened with expulsion from school if she participated.

=== St. Patrick's Day celebrations ===
In late February 2009, Martino advised three local Irish American organizations that he would close St. Peter’s Cathedral during Saint Patrick's Day celebrations if the groups featured elected officials who supported abortion rights at their annual events. Martino, "determined to prevent a scandal," stated that such officials should not be "given parade positions or dais opportunities either to be recognized or to speak to the assembled participants," which would "honor pro-abortion officials" or make it appear that “the Catholic Church is seen to be involved in this honoring.”

== See also ==
- Catholic Church hierarchy
- Catholic Church in the United States
- Historical list of the Catholic bishops of the United States
- List of Catholic bishops of the United States
- Lists of patriarchs, archbishops, and bishops

== Episcopal succession ==
Catholic Church titles
Preceded by James Clifford Timlin	Bishop of Scranton; 2003–2009	Succeeded by Joseph Bambera
Preceded by –	Auxiliary Bishop of Philadelphia; 1996–2003	Succeeded by –
