= Diocese of Scranton =

Latin Catholic ecclesiastical jurisdiction in Pennsylvania, USA

Coordinates: 41.41001°N 75.66297°W

Diocese of Scranton Dioecesis Scrantonensis
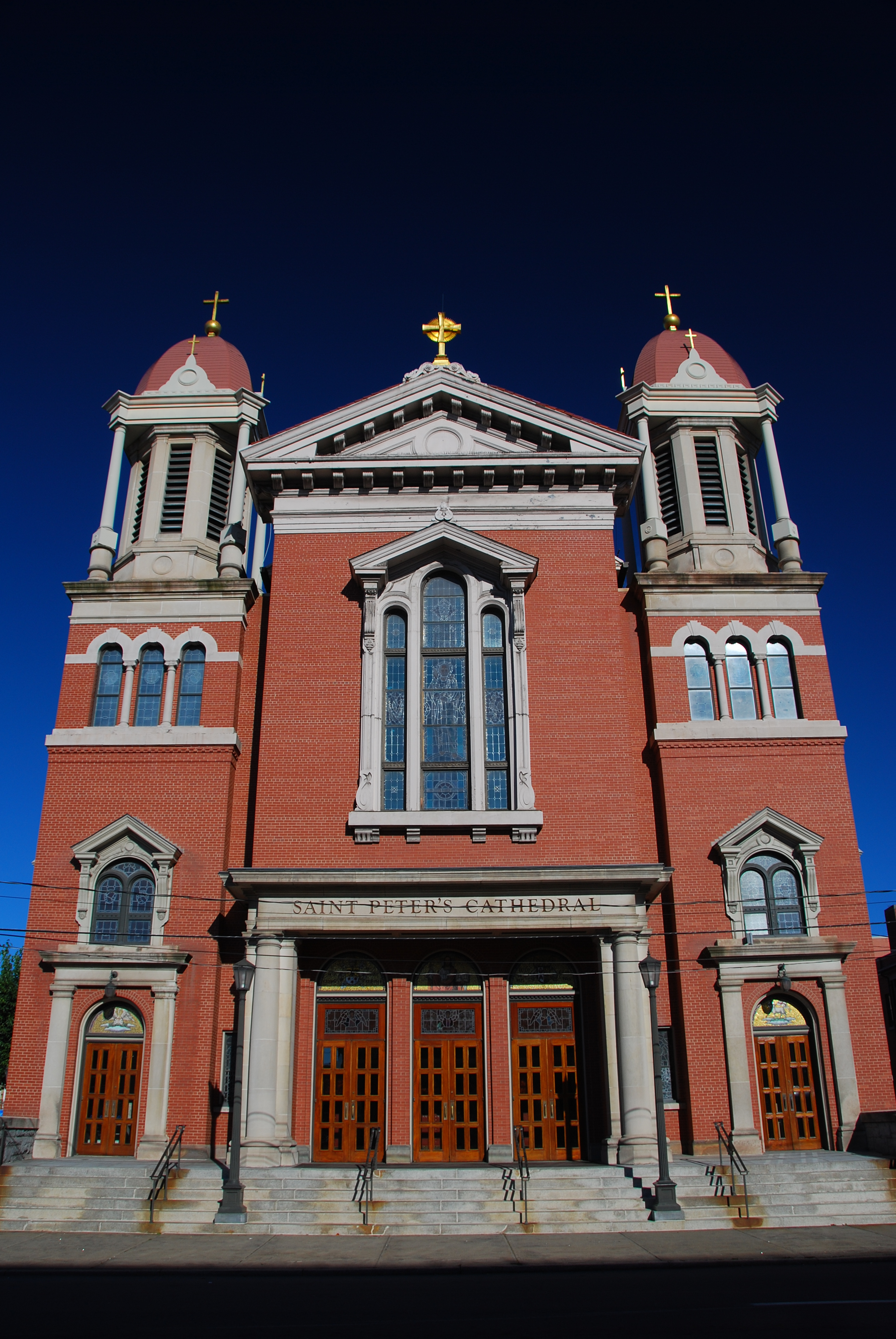
- St. Peter's Cathedral

- Coat of Arms of the Diocese of Scranton

Location
- Country: United States of America
- Territory: Northeastern Pennsylvania
- Ecclesiastical province: Philadelphia

Statistics
- Area: 22,913 km^{2} (8,847 sq mi)
- Population: Total; Catholics: (as of 2023); 1,098,910 (est.) ▼; 317,429 ▲ (28.9%)
- Parishes: 114 ▼
- Churches: 167
- Schools: 19

Information
- Denomination: Catholic
- Sui iuris church: Latin Church
- Rite: Roman Rite
- Established: March 3, 1868
- Cathedral: St. Peter's Cathedral
- Patron saint: Peter
- Secular priests: 214 (diocesan) ▼41 (Religious Orders) ▼93 Permanent Deacons ▲

Current leadership
- Pope: Leo XIV
- Bishop: Joseph Bambera
- Metropolitan Archbishop: Nelson J. Perez
- Bishops emeritus: Joseph Martino

Map
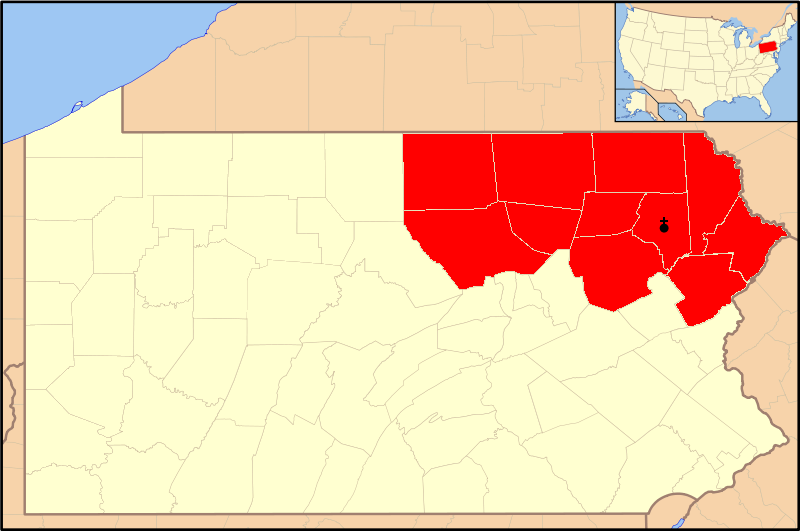

Website
- dioceseofscranton.org

The Diocese of Scranton (Latin: Dioecesis Scrantonensis) is a diocese of the Catholic Church in northeastern Pennsylvania in the United States. Established in 1868, it is a suffragan see of Archdiocese of Philadelphia. The mother church is St. Peter's Cathedral in Scranton.

== Territory ==
The Diocese of Scranton includes the cities of Scranton, Wilkes-Barre, Williamsport, Hazleton, Nanticoke, Carbondale and Pittston. The diocese comprises Lackawanna, Luzerne, Bradford, Susquehanna, Wayne, Tioga, Sullivan, Wyoming, Lycoming, Pike, and Monroe counties. The area of the diocese is 8,487 square miles (21,980 km^{2}).

== Early history ==
=== 1700 to 1800 ===
Unlike the other British colonies in America, the Province of Pennsylvania did not ban Catholics from the colony or threaten priests with imprisonment. However, the colony did require any Catholics seeking public office to take an oath declaring the Mass to be idolatrous and denying the presence of Christ in the eucharist.

In 1784, a year after the end of the American Revolution, Pope Pius VI erected the Apostolic Prefecture of United States of America, including all of the new United States. In 1787, James Pellentz traveled from Baltimore up the Susquehanna River into northeast Pennsylvania to minister to the Catholics scattered throughout the region.

In 1789, Pius VI converted the prefecture to the Diocese of Baltimore, covering all of the United States. With the passage of the US Bill of Rights in 1791, Catholics received full freedom of worship.

In 1793, the French Catholic settlement of French Azilum was founded on the banks of the Susquehanna River near Standing Stone. It was meant as a refuge for French aristocrats fleeing persecution in the French Revolution and slave uprisings in the French colony of Saint-Domingue.

=== 1800 to 1860 ===
In 1808, Pope Pius VII erected the Diocese of Philadelphia, covering all of Pennsylvania. Northeastern Pennsylvania would remain part of this new diocese for the next 60 years.

The first Catholic settlers in northeastern Pennsylvania were mainly of Irish and German descent. The earliest permanent Catholic settlements in the region were founded at Friendsville in 1819 and Silver Lake in 1813. Catholic residents of these settlements, along with others in the region, occasionally saw priests sent from the Diocese of Philadelphia. In 1825, Bishop Francis Kenrick sent John O'Flynn to the region to serve as its first resident pastor. He was responsible for Catholic residents in thirteen counties in northeastern Pennsylvania and five counties in the Southern Tier of New York.

The first church in northeastern Pennsylvania was built in 1825 near Silver Lake. O'Flynn died at Danville in 1829, and was succeeded by William Clancy. Clancy departed the region in 1834 and in 1836 the diocese sent Henry Fitzsimmons to replace him. Fitzsimmons took up his residence in Carbondale, where a church had been built in 1832. In 1838, the diocese sent John Vincent O'Reilly to assist in the region. He took up his residence at Silver Lake.

St. Mary's church, finished in 1842, was the first Catholic church in Wilkes-Barre. The first one in Scranton was built in 1852 on the site of the present day Church of Nativity. In Williamsport, a German group erected the first Catholic church, St. Boniface, in 1855.

=== 1860 to 1900 ===
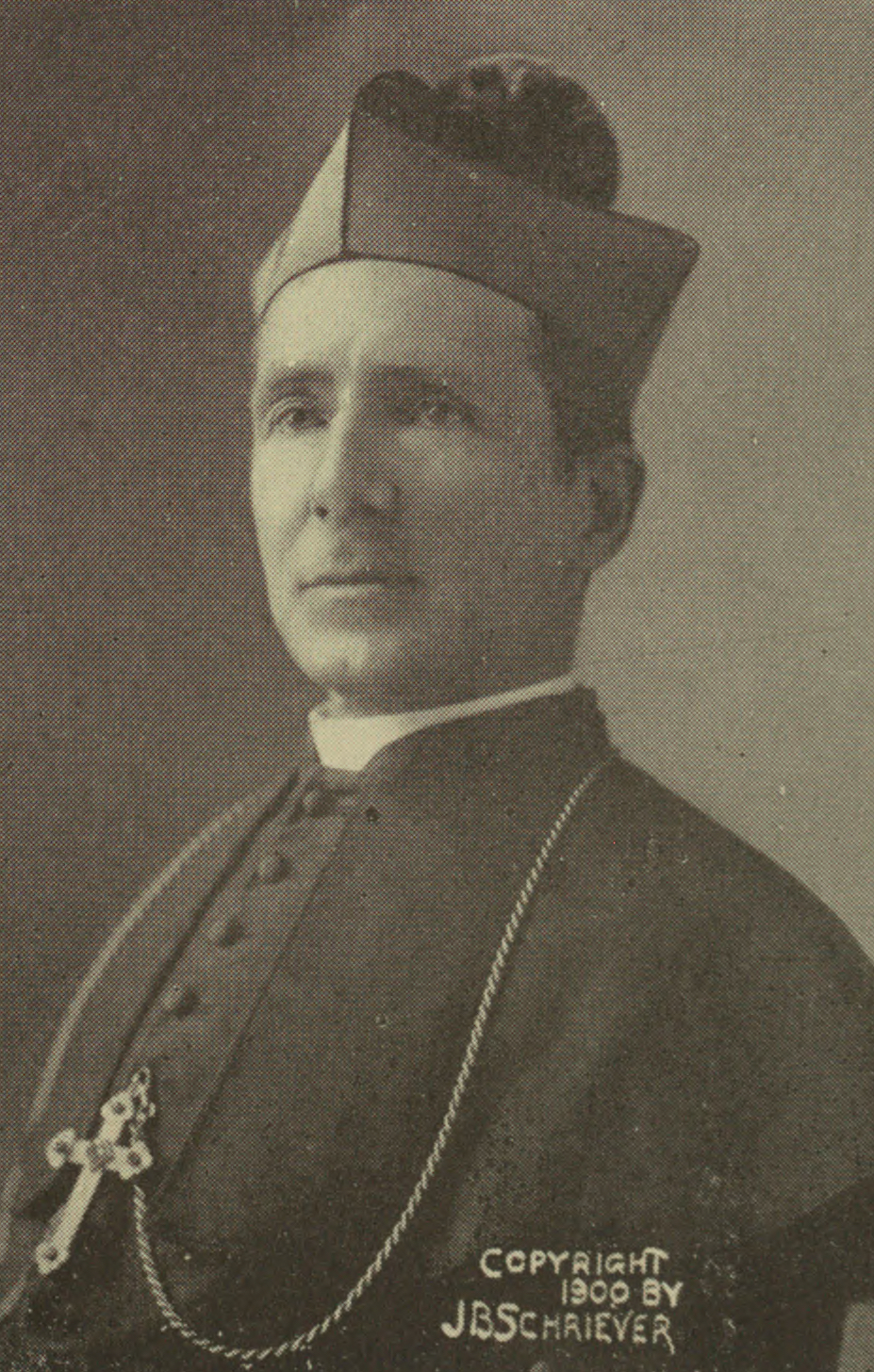
Bishop Hoban (1900)

The Diocese of Scranton was erected on March 3, 1868, its territory coming from the Archdiocese of Philadelphia. William O'Hara of Philadelphia was the first bishop. The diocese had a Catholic population of 25,000 with 47 churches, 25 priests, and two parochial schools. By the late 19th and early 20th centuries, Slavic and Italian immigrants, attracted by jobs in the coal-mining industry, comprised half of the Catholic population in the diocese.

In 1896, Pope Leo XIII appointed Michael Hoban as coadjutor bishop of the diocese to assist O'Hara. Later in 1896, a schism erupted at Sacred Hearts Parish in the coal mining area of the diocese. The English-speaking miners in the parish were suspicious of an influx of Polish immigrants into the mine fields. The Polish parishioners did not like how their German pastor ran the parish. In October 1896, 250 families left the parish, built a new church and requested recognition from the diocese for St. Stanislaus as a new parish. Hoban refused to give it. In March 1887, the Polish priest Frances Hodur became the pastor of St. Stanislaus; Hoban suspended him the next week. In September 1898, Hodur submitted a compromise proposal to Hoban, which he rejected. In October 1898, Hoban excommunicated Hodur. He and his congregation eventually set up the Polish National Catholic Church, living in schism with the Roman Catholic Church.

When O'Hara died in 1899 after 31 years as bishop, the diocese had a Catholic population of 125,000, with 78 churches, 130 priests, and 40 parochial schools with 12,000 students. Hoban became the second bishop of Scranton in 1899 after O'Hara's death.

=== 1900 to 1984 ===
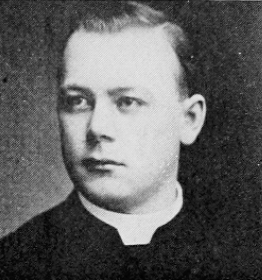
Bishop O'Reilly (1917)

After Hoban's death in 1926, Thomas O'Reilly from the Diocese of Cleveland was named the third bishop of Scranton. During his tenure, he established seven parishes and fourteen schools in the diocese, despite the Great Depression. Bishop William Hafey from the Diocese of Raleigh became coadjutor bishop in 1936. Hafey became bishop of Scranton after O'Reilly died in 1938. Hafey oversaw the creation of new parishes. During his tenure the number of priests and religious increased. He died in 1954 after 18 years in office.

Jerome Hannan of the Diocese of Pittsburgh became the next bishop of Scranton in 1954. During his tenure, Hannan oversaw the construction of the chancery building and in 1962 Saint Pius X Seminary in Dalton. Hannan died in 1965. His successor was Bishop J. Carroll McCormick from the Diocese of Altoona-Johnstown, in 1966. McCormick retired in 1983. Auxiliary Bishop John O'Connor from the Military Vicariate for the United States succeeded him as bishop of Scranton. O'Connor served less than a year before being elevated to archbishop of the Archdiocese of New York in 1984.

=== 1984 to 2000 ===
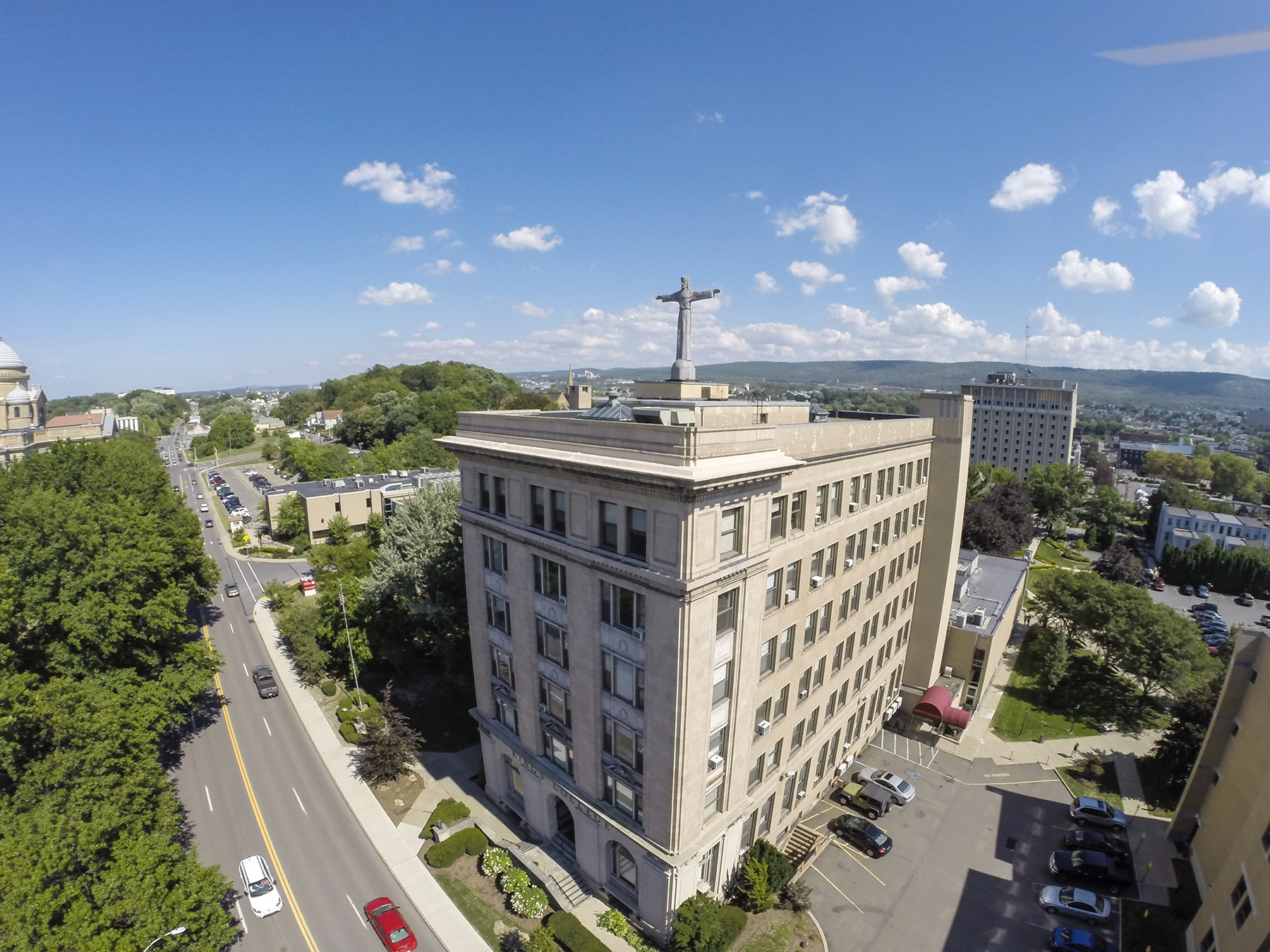
Kings College, Wilkes-Barre, Pennsylvania (2014)

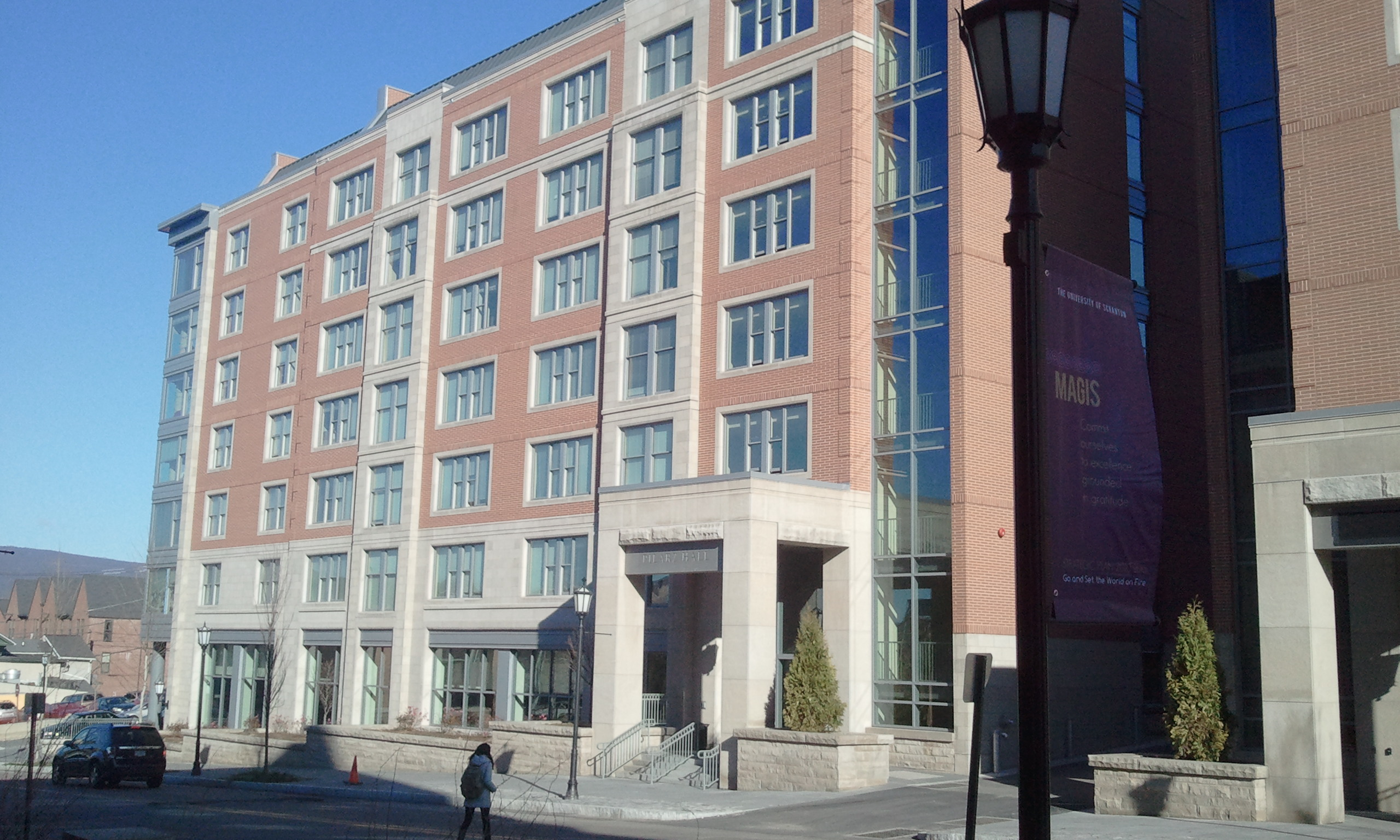
University of Scranton, Scranton, Pennsylvania (2011)

In 1984, Auxiliary Bishop James Timlin of Scranton began his term as eighth bishop of the diocese. Timlin was the first native of Scranton to become its bishop. During his tenure, Timlin held the Second Diocesan Synod, established the Bishop's Annual Appeal and presided over a major restructuring of parishes as a result of the priest shortage. He introduced a new policy for Catholic schools consisting of regional mergers, construction of modern facilities, new fundraising efforts and a more equitable sharing of operational costs between parents, pastors and the diocese.

In 1985, Timlin announced that he would boycott two events honoring Catholic congressmen because of their support of abortion rights for women. One was Peter W. Rodino Jr. The other was Democratic Speaker of the House Tip O'Neill Jr. In 2003, Timlin refused to attend the commencement ceremonies for the University of Scranton because of the pro-choice stance of honorary-degree recipient Chris Matthews.

=== 2000 to present ===
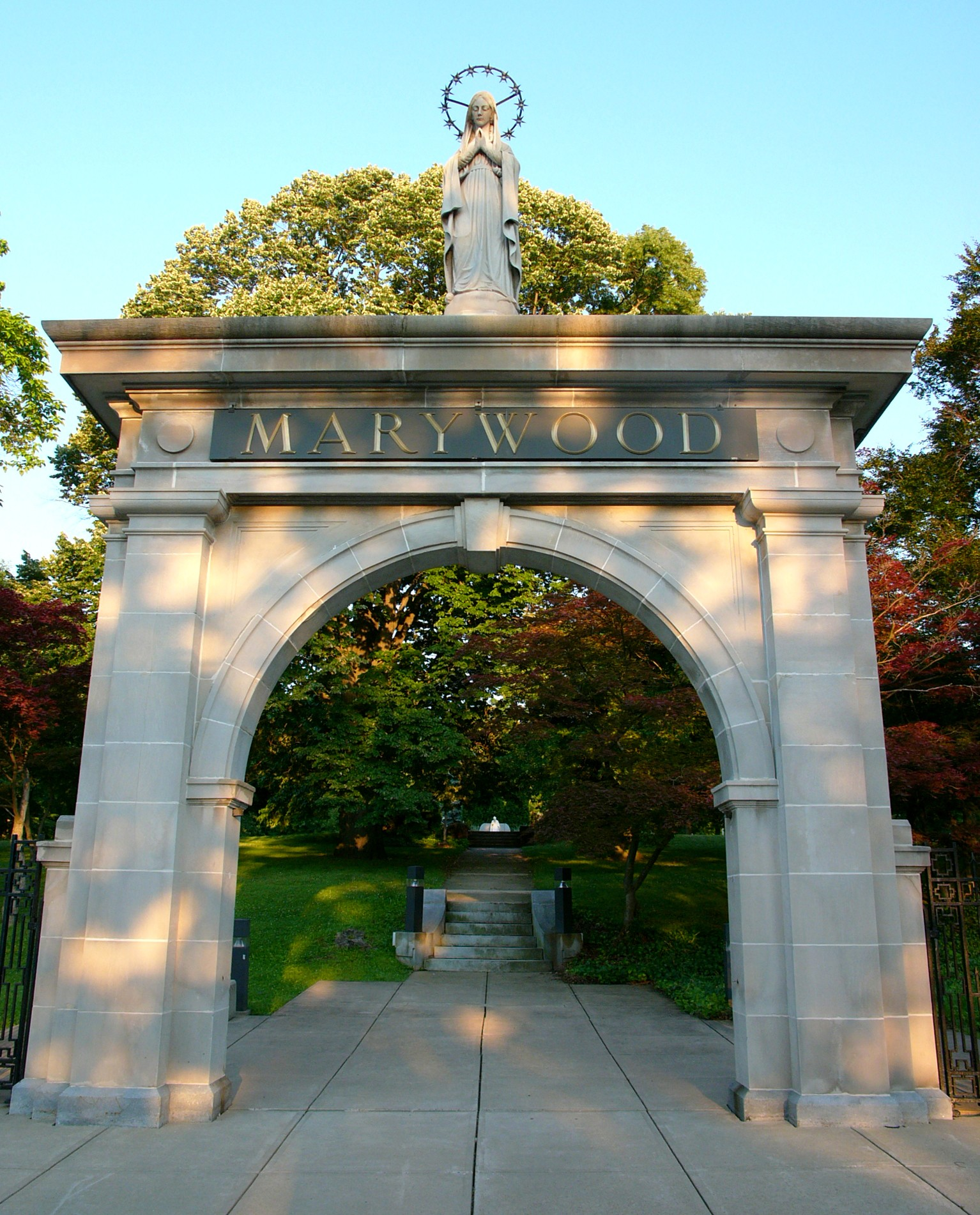
Marywood University, Scranton, Pennsylvania

After Timlin retired in 2002, John Paul II named Auxiliary Bishop Joseph Martino of Philadelphia in 2003 as the next bishop of Scranton. In 2004, the diocese closed Saint Pius X Seminary due to decreased enrollment. In January 2007, Martino closed Bishop O'Reilly, Seton Catholic, Bishop Hafey, Bishop Hoban, Bishop O'Hara, and Bishop Hannan high schools, along with several grade schools. In total he closed about 30 schools. In January 2009, Martino announced that, due to a priest shortage and diminishing financial resources, the diocese would either close or consolidate almost half of its 209 parishes.

In 2008, Martino decertified the Scranton Diocese Association of Catholic Teachers, which had functioned in the diocese for 30 years. He replaced it with a diocesan association of teachers. The head of the teachers union described this new organization as a "company union".

When the presidents of four Catholic universities and colleges in the diocese asked to meet with Martino, he asked to see syllabi of all their courses on religion, faith, and morals. The presidents refused this request, stating that their professors owned the syllabi. According to a 2009 report in National Catholic Reporter, the apostolic nuncio to the United States received numerous complaints about Martino's management style, his lack of consultation with others, and his remoteness. Martino retired early in 2009.

In 2010, Pope Benedict XVI appointed Joseph C. Bambera as the tenth bishop of the diocese. As of 2025, Bambera is the current bishop of the diocese.

== Bishops ==
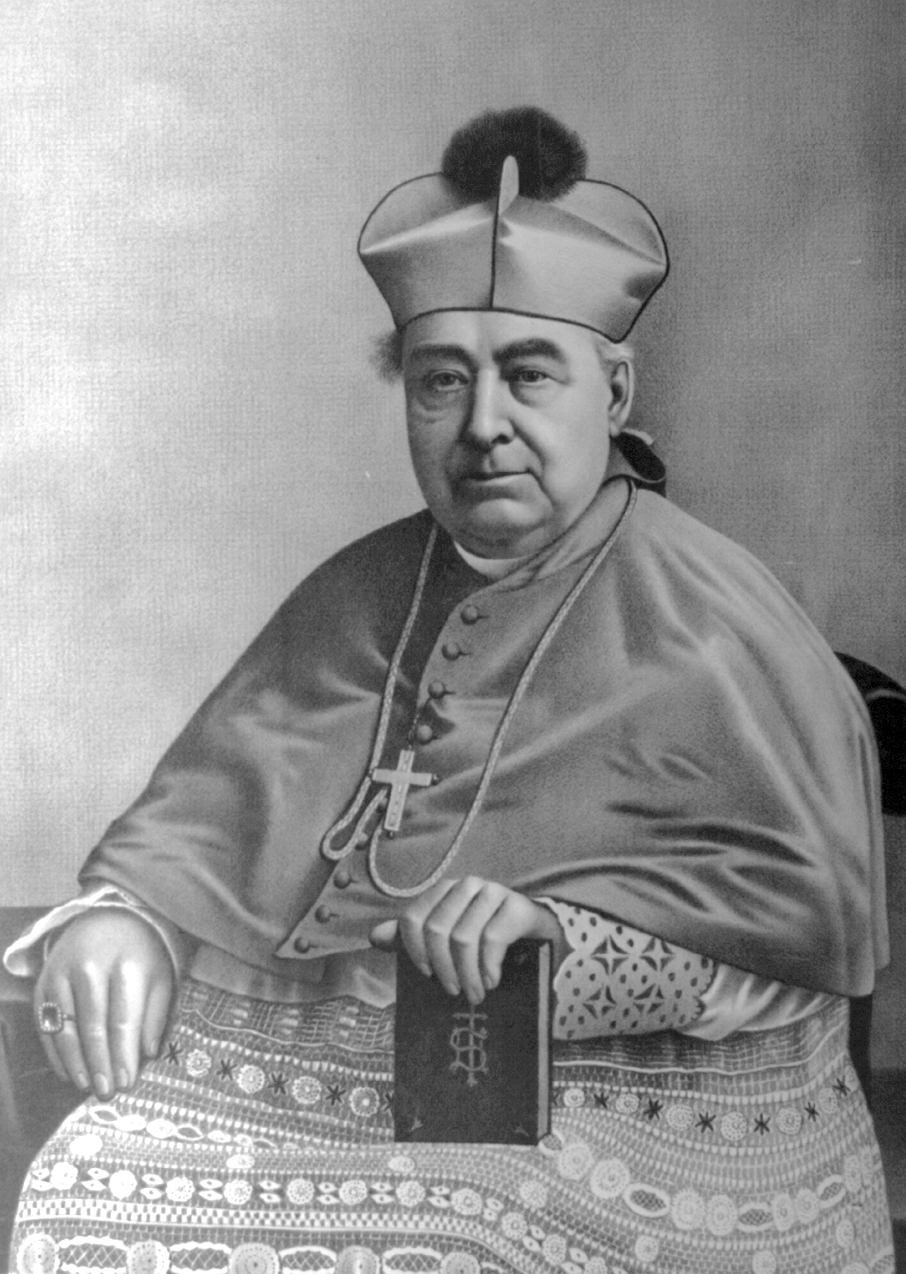
Bishop O'Hara (1893)

=== Bishops of Scranton ===
1. William O'Hara (1868–1899)
2. Michael Hoban (1899–1927; coadjutor bishop 1896–1899)
3. Thomas C. O'Reilly (1927–1938)
4. William Hafey (1938–1954; coadjutor bishop 1937–1938)
5. Jerome Hannan (1954–1965)
6. J. Carroll McCormick (1966–1983)
7. John O'Connor (1983–1984), appointed Archbishop of New York (Cardinal in 1985)
8. James Timlin (1984–2003)
9. Joseph Martino (2003–2009)
10. Joseph Bambera (2010–present)

=== Former auxiliary bishops ===
- Andrew Brennan (1923–1926), appointed Bishop of Richmond
- Martin O'Connor (1942–1946), appointed Rector of the Pontifical North American College and later President of the Pontifical Council for Social Communications and Apostolic Nuncio and Titular Archbishop
- Henry Klonowski (1947–1973)
- James Timlin (1976–1984), appointed Bishop of Scranton
- Francis X. DiLorenzo (1988–1994), appointed Bishop of Honolulu and later Bishop of Richmond
- John Dougherty (1995–2009)

=== Other diocesan priests who became bishops ===
- Eugene Augustine Garvey, appointed Bishop of Altoona in 1901
- Joseph Kopacz, appointed Bishop of Jackson in 2013
- Jeffrey Walsh, appointed Bishop of Gaylord in 2021

== Education ==
In 1842, John O'Reilly opened the first Catholic college in the region at St. Joseph's Parish in Susquehanna County. Over its 22 years of its existence, the college educated two bishops and over 20 priests. Destroyed by fire in 1864, the college was never rebuilt.

In the 1940s, the diocese opened the South Scranton Catholic High School, later named Bishop Klonowski High School. The school closed in 1982. Bishop Martino in 2007 closed all the high schools in Lackawanna and Luzerne Counties, replacing them with Holy Cross High School in Dumore and Holy Redeemer High School in Wilkes-Barre.

In 2010, Bishop Bambera announced the closure of four elementary school sites. As of 2025, the diocese has 15 elementary schools and four high schools.

=== Higher education ===
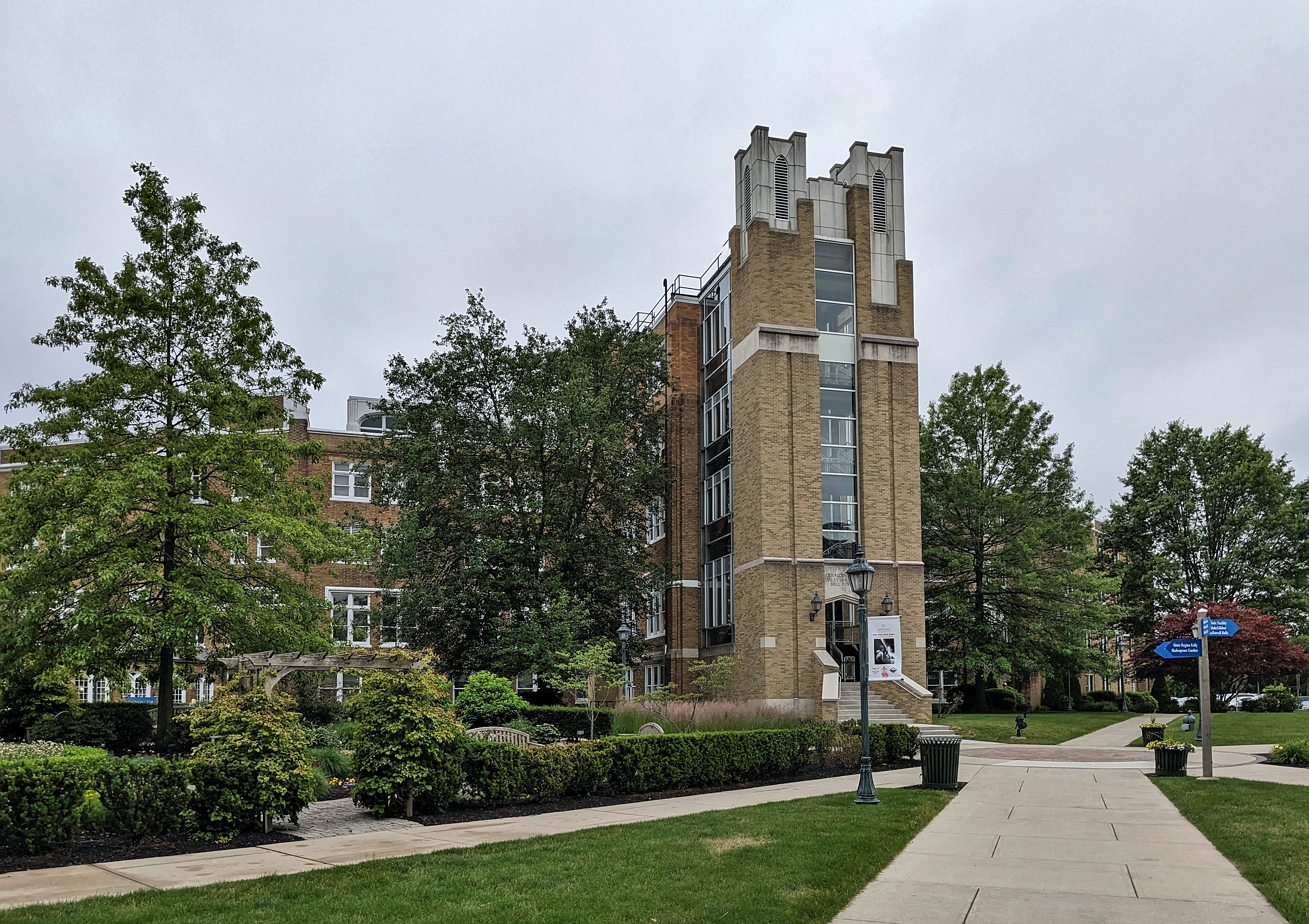
Misericordia University, Dallas, Pennsylvania (2023)

- St. Thomas College – Scranton (1888). It was later operated by the Christian Brothers. In 1938, it became the University of Scranton. The Society of Jesus assumed operation of the university in 1942.
- Marywood University – Scranton (1915). Founded by the Sisters of the Immaculate Heart of Mary
- Misericordia University – Dallas (1924). Founded by the Religious Sisters of Mercy
- King's College – Wilkes-Barre (1946). Operated by the Congregation of the Holy Cross

=== High Schools ===
As of 2025, the diocese operates the following high schools

- Holy Cross High School – Dunmore
- Holy Redeemer High School – Wilkes-Barre
- Notre Dame Jr/Sr. High School – East Stroudsburg
- St. John Neumann Jr/Sr High School – Williamsport

=== Elementary schools ===
As of 2025, the diocese operates the following elementary schools.

=== Non-diocesan school ===
Scranton Preparatory School – Scranton is an independent high school operated by the Society of Jesus.

== Sex abuse investigation ==
=== 1960 to 2010 ===
In August 1968, a Hazelton police office wrote to Bishop McCormick about Robert N. Caparelli, then assistant pastor at Most Precious Blood Parish in Hazelton. The officer stated that a woman had complained to him about the relationship between Caparelli and her two young sons. This information was confirmed by the church pastor. McCormick then transferred Caparelli to a new parish. In 1974, a Pennsylvania State Police trooper confronted Caparelli with accusations of sexual abuse of different victims. Caparelli admitted guilt, and was transferred to another diocese.

Caparelli was charged in 1991 with the sexual assault in 1985 of a minor in 1985. He pleaded guilty in December 1991 and was sentenced to two to five years in prison. That same month, the victim sued the diocese. In 1993, Bishop Timlin sent a letter to the court, asking it to transfer Caparelli to a Catholic treatment facility. Caparelli died in 1994. More of his victims contacted the diocese in later years.

=== 2010 to 2020 ===
In early 2016, a grand jury investigation led by Pennsylvania attorney general Josh Shapiro began an inquiry into sexual abuse by Catholic clergy in six Pennsylvania dioceses, including the Diocese of Scranton. In July 2018, the Pennsylvania Supreme Court ordered the public release of a redacted copy of the grand jury report. In August 2018, Bishop Bambera stated that he would cooperate with the investigation and publish the list of "credibly accused clergy". The grand jury report later that month showed 59 clergy from the diocese with credible accusation of sexual abuse of children.

In August 2018, Bambera forbade Timlin from representing the diocese in public, given Timlin's failure to protect children from abusers. The 2018 grand jury report had criticized Timlin's handling of sexual abuse allegations against Thomas Skotek, a priest at St Casimir Parish in Freeland. Between 1980 and 1985, Skotek had raped and eventually impregnated a teenage girl in the parish. In October 1986, after Timlin learned about the crime, he sent Skotek to Saint Luke Institute in Silver Spring, Maryland for psychological evaluation. In 1987, after Skotek returned to the diocese, Timlin reassigned him to St. Aloysius Parish in Wilkes-Barre. Timlin never notified parishioners in St. Aloysius or civil authorities about Skotek's rape of the girl. Bambera himself had served as the vicar for priests for the diocese from 1995 to 1998, and he admitted helping Timlin reassign a priest who had abused a minor, although the decision was made by Timlin. Bambera emphasized that since becoming bishop in 2010, he has pursued a zero-tolerance policy toward clerical abuse.

In August 2018, King's College in Wilkes-Barre announced that it was removing McCormick's name from the chapel and campus ministry. That same month, the University of Scranton removed McCormick and Timlin's names from its facilities.

== Books ==
- Earley, James Benedict (1994). Envisioning Faith: The Pictorial History of the Diocese of Scranton. Devon PA USA: W.T. Cooke Pub.
- Gallagher, John P. (1968). A Century of History: The Diocese of Scranton, 1868-1968. Scranton: Diocese of Scranton.
- Gallagher, John P. (1993). A Second Century Begins: The Diocese of Scranton, 1968-1993. Scranton: Diocese of Scranton.
- Kashuba, Cheryl A.; Miller-Lanning, Darlene; Sweeney, Alan (2005). Scranton. Charleston SC USA: Arcadia Publishing. ISBN 978-0-7385-3859-4.
- Keenan, Sister M. Michel, IHM (2016). The Sisters, Servants of the Immaculate Heart of Mary: Scranton, Pennsylvania: 1974-1994. Pittsburgh PA: Dorrance Publishing. ISBN 978-1-4809-1956-3.
- McCook, Brian (2011). The Borders of Integration: Polish Migrants in Germany and the United States, 1870-1924. Athens OH: Ohio University Press. ISBN 978-0-8214-1926-7.
- Włdarski, Szczepan (1974). The Origin and Growth of the Polish National Catholic Church. Scranton PA: Polish National Catholic Church.
- Zawistowski, Theodore L. (1998). Bishop Francis Hodur: Biographical Essays. East European Monographs. ISBN 978-0-944497-12-8.
