= St. Peter's Cathedral (Scranton, Pennsylvania) =

Historic church in Pennsylvania, United States

- St. Peter's Cathedral Complex
- U.S. National Register of Historic Places
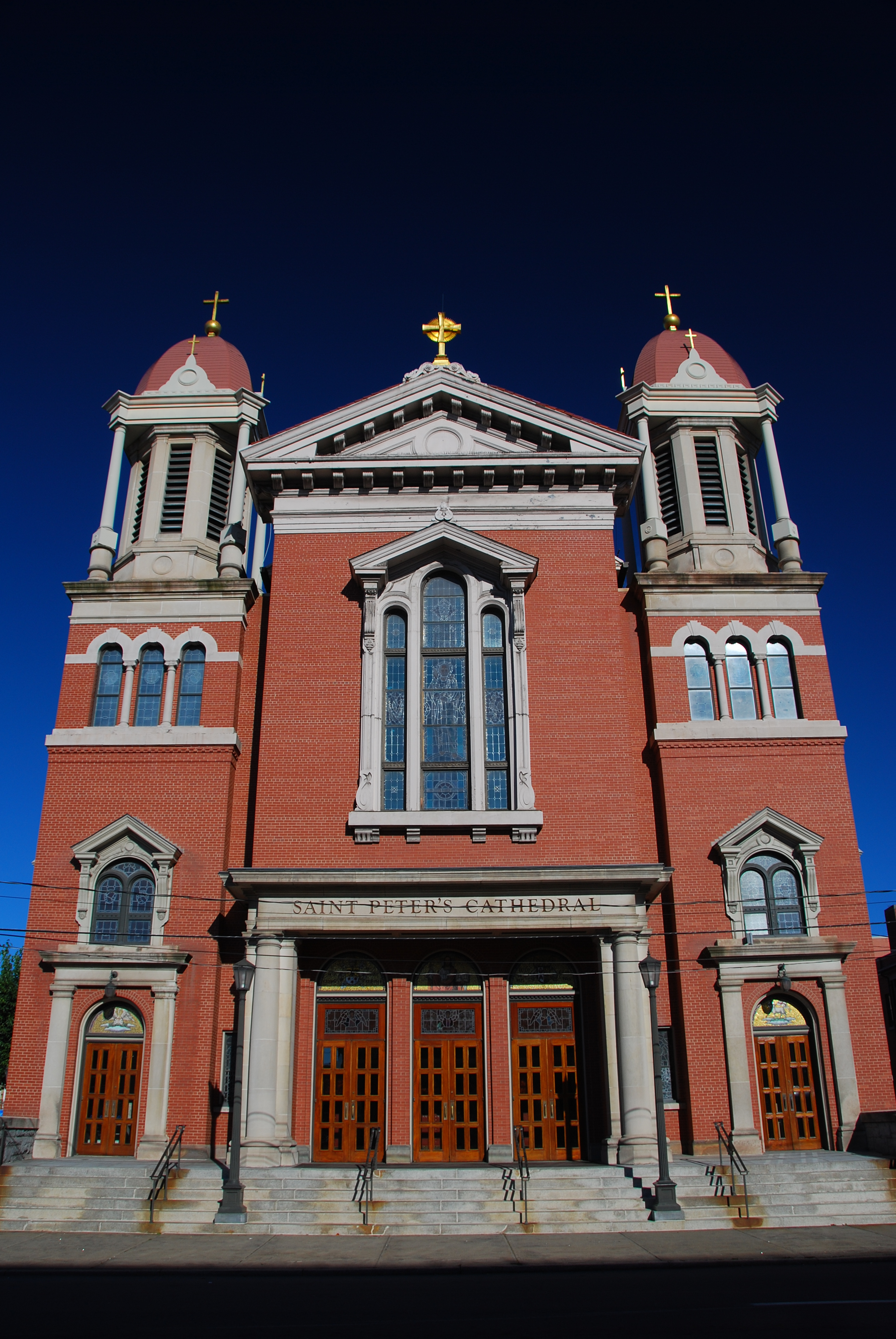
- St. Peter's Cathedral in September 2009

- Location within Pennsylvania Location within the United States
- Location: 315 Wyoming Ave., Scranton, Pennsylvania, U.S.
- Coordinates: 41°24′38″N 75°39′50″W
- Area: 1.3 acres (0.53 ha)
- Built: 1867
- Architect: Amsden, Joel; Hancock, Lewis
- Architectural style: Romanesque
- NRHP reference No.: 76001645
- Added to NRHP: July 19, 1976

St. Peter's Cathedral is the Roman Catholic cathedral at 315 Wyoming Avenue in Scranton, Pennsylvania, and is the mother church of the Roman Catholic Diocese of Scranton. The entire St. Peter's Cathedral Complex is listed on the U.S. National Register of Historic Places.

== Description ==
The church was built in 1867, as the parish church of St. Vincent de Paul. In 1883–84, a project was undertaken to remodel and embellish the church, which by now was the central church of the diocese, and on September 28, 1884, the new mother church of the diocese was consecrated by Archbishop P. J. Ryan of Philadelphia, and its name changed to the Cathedral of St. Peter, marking its new role in the still-young diocese. The cathedral complex includes the adjacent rectory (1908) and convent.

The original windows of the church contained simple red and white diamond-shaped panes. The stained glass windows now found in the cathedral date from the alterations begun in 1883. Much of this work can be attributed to the architect Edwin Forrest Durang and later to the German designer Frank Mayer. In addition to the use of stained glass in the clerestory and over the entrances, there are 15 grandiose windows focusing on the life of Christ and highlighting the Virgin Mary and other saints. Of special note are the windows depicting the Annunciation, the Visitation, the Nativity, and the Last Supper.

The complex was listed on the National Register of Historic Places in 1976.

The present organ was built in 1979 by Casavant Frères of Quebec, Canada, the firm's Opus 3414.

In February 2008, the cathedral was chosen by EWTN's Cathedrals Across America series to host the globally televised Mass for the Feast of the Chair of St. Peter.

== Cathedral staff ==
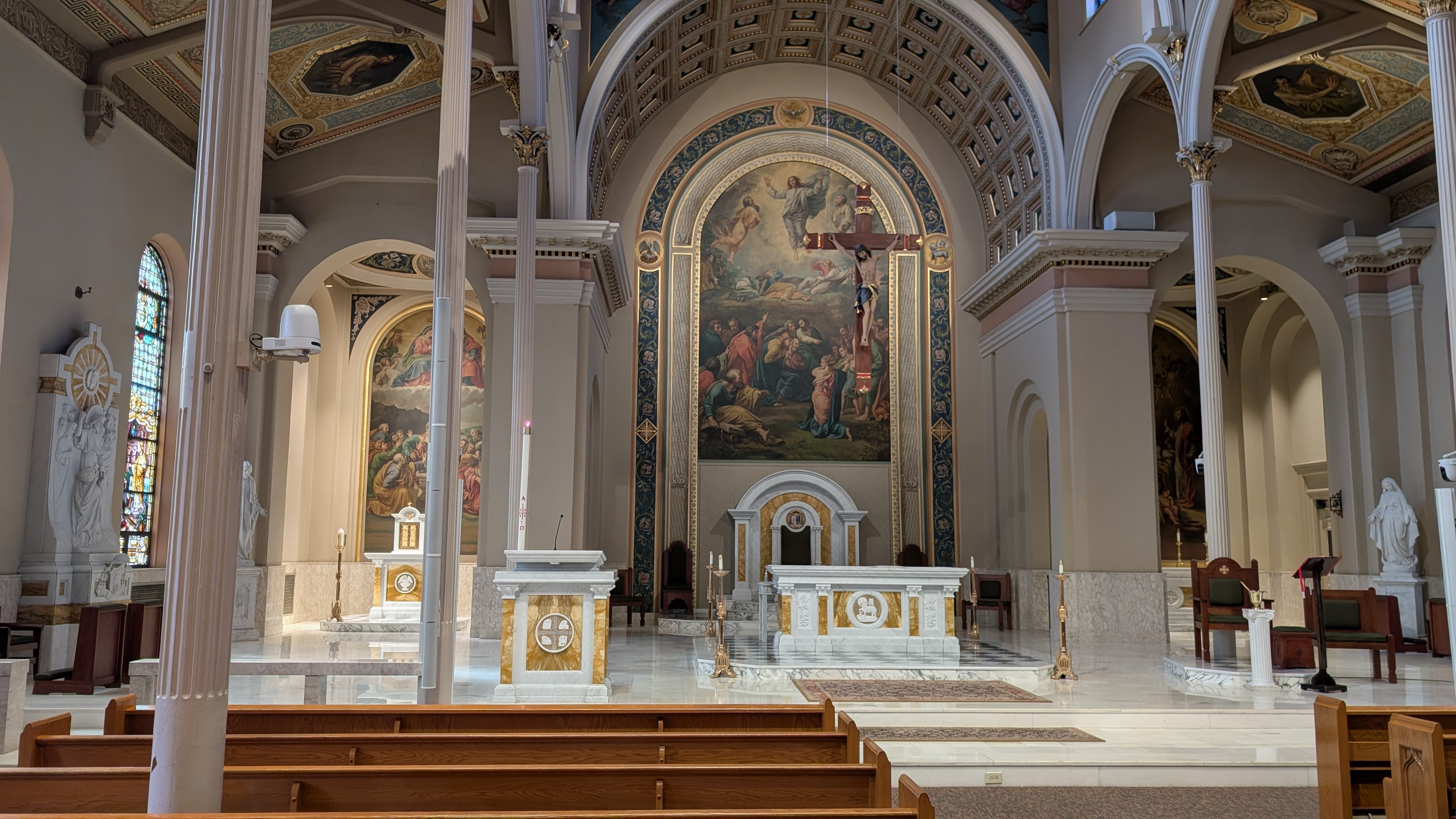
Interior of St. Peter's Cathedral

- The Most Reverend Joseph C. Bambera, Bishop of Scranton
- Monsignor Dale R. Rupert, Pastor
- The Reverend Thomas M. Muldowney, V.G., Vicar General
- Deacon Edward R. Shoener, Permanent Deacon
- The Reverend Jeffrey J. Walsh, Episcopal Vicar for Clergy
- Kathy Geiger, Business Manager
- Marlene Lucchi, Secretary
- Linda Phillips Orseck director of liturgical music
- Paul Casparo, Sacristan

== See also ==
- List of cathedrals in the United States
- List of Catholic cathedrals in the United States
