= Justin Rigali =

American Catholic cardinal (born 1935)

His Eminence Justin Rigali
- Cardinal, Archbishop Emeritus of Philadelphia
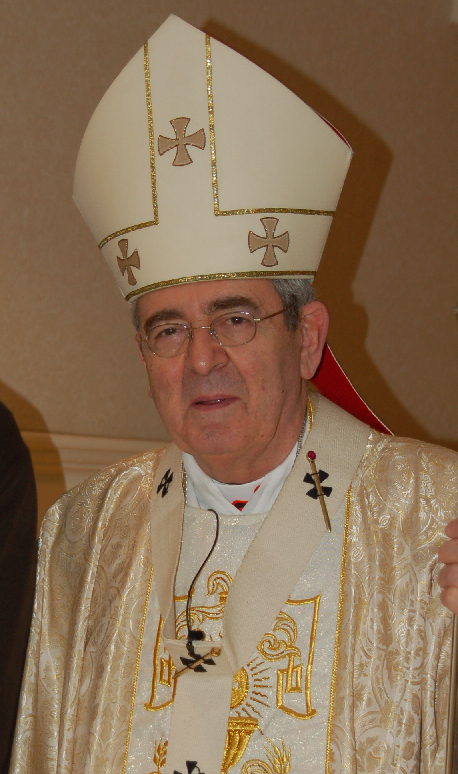
- Archdiocese: Philadelphia
- Appointed: July 15, 2003
- Installed: October 7, 2003
- Retired: July 19, 2011
- Predecessor: Anthony Bevilacqua
- Successor: Charles Chaput
- Other posts: Cardinal-Priest of S. Prisca; Episcopal Liaison to CMSWR
- Previous posts: Archbishop of St. Louis (1994–2003); Secretary of the College of Cardinals (1990–1994); Secretary of the Congregation for Bishops (1990–1994); President of the Pontifical Ecclesiastical Academy (1985–1990); Titular Archbishop of Volsinium (1985–1994)

Orders
- Ordination: April 25, 1961 by James Francis McIntyre
- Consecration: September 14, 1985 by John Paul II, Eduardo Martínez Somalo, and Achille Silvestrini
- Created cardinal: October 21, 2003 by John Paul II
- Rank: Cardinal-Priest

Personal details
- Born: Justin Francis Rigali; April 19, 1935 (age 91) Los Angeles, California, US
- Denomination: Catholic
- Motto: Verbum caro factum est (The Word became flesh)
- Styles
- Reference style: His Eminence
- Spoken style: Your Eminence
- Religious style: Cardinal
- Informal style: Cardinal
- See: Philadelphia (Emeritus)

Ordination history
History
Episcopal consecration
- Consecrated by: Pope John Paul II
- Date: September 14, 1985
Episcopal succession
Bishops consecrated by Justin Rigali as principal consecrator
- Edward Kenneth Braxton: May 17, 1995
- John R. Gaydos: August 27, 1997
- Michael John Sheridan: September 3, 1997
- Joseph Fred Naumann: September 3, 1997
- Timothy Michael Dolan: August 15, 2001
- Robert Joseph Hermann: December 12, 2002
- Lawrence Eugene Brandt: March 4, 2004
- Joseph R. Cistone: July 28, 2004
- Joseph P. McFadden: July 28, 2004
- Kevin C. Rhoades: December 9, 2004
- Daniel E. Thomas: July 26, 2006
- Richard Stika: March 19, 2009
- Timothy C. Senior: July 31, 2009
- Joseph Bambera: April 26, 2010
- John J. McIntyre: August 6, 2010
- Michael J. Fitzgerald: August 6, 2010

Justin Francis Rigali (born April 19, 1935) is an American prelate of the Catholic Church. After a diplomatic and academic career in Rome, he served as Archbishop of St. Louis from 1994 to 2003. He then served as Archbishop of Philadelphia from 2003 until his resignation in 2011, following a probe into the Archdiocese of Philadelphia sex abuse scandal. He was created a cardinal in 2003.

== Biography ==
=== Early life and education ===
The youngest of seven children, Justin Rigali was born on April 19, 1935, in Los Angeles, California, to Henry Alphonsus and Frances Irene (née White) Rigali. His sister Charlotte joined the Sisters of St. Joseph and his brother Norbert the Society of Jesus. Rigali attended Holy Cross School before entering the preparatory seminary in Hancock Park, Los Angeles, in 1949.

Rigali studied at one of the Los Angeles College campuses, at Our Lady Queen of Angels Seminary in San Fernando, California, and at St. John's Seminary in Camarillo, California.

=== Priesthood ===
Rigali was ordained to the priesthood for the Archdiocese of Los Angeles by Cardinal James Francis McIntyre on April 25, 1961. After his ordination, Rigali received pastoral assignments at parishes in Los Angeles and Downey, California.

In 1961, Rigali earned a Bachelor of Sacred Theology degree from the Catholic University of America in Washington, D.C. In October 1961, he entered the graduate division of the Pontifical North American College in Rome, obtaining a Doctor of Canon Law degree from the Pontifical Gregorian University in 1964.

While in Rome, Rigali served as an assistant during the first two sessions (1962–1963) of the Second Vatican Council. Rigali returned to California in the summer of 1964 and was briefly assigned as an associate pastor at a parish in Pomona. Back to Rome, he studied at the Pontifical Ecclesiastical Academy from 1964 to 1966 in preparation for his diplomatic work for the Vatican.

=== Vatican Secretariat ===
Rigali began his service in the English section of the Secretariat of State on November 25, 1964. From September 1966 to February 1970, he served as secretary of the Apostolic Nunciature to Madagascar. The Vatican named Rigali as a papal chamberlain on July 11, 1967. On February 11, 1970, Rigali became director of the English section of the Secretariat of State. He also served as the English translator for Pope Paul VI, accompanying him on several international trips.

During his service at the Secretariat of State, Rigali also served as a chaplain at a Carmelite monastery and as a professor at the Pontifical Ecclesiastical Academy. He accompanied Pope John Paul II on several international trips, including his 1979 and 1987 visits to the United States. The Vatican elevated Rigali to a prelate of honor on April 19, 1980, and he was appointed a magistral chaplain in the Order of the Knights of Malta on October 25, 1984.

=== Pontifical Ecclesiastical Academy ===
On June 8, 1985, Rigali was appointed president of the Pontifical Ecclesiastical Academy and titular archbishop of Volsinium by John Paul II. He received his episcopal consecration on September 14, 1985, from John Paul II, with Cardinals Eduardo Somalo and Achille Silvestrini as co-consecrators, at Albano Cathedral in Lazio, Italy. Rigali selected as his episcopal motto: Verbum Caro Factum Est, meaning, "The Word Became Flesh" (John 1:14). He was named a member of the Order of the Holy Sepulchre on October 13, 1986.

From 1985 to 1990, Rigali also held several positions within the Roman Curia:

- Secretary of the Congregation for Bishops, appointed by John Paul II on December 21, 1989; he was the second-highest official of that dicastery.
- Secretary of the College of Cardinals, named by John Paul II on January 2, 1990
- Member of the Permanent Interdicasterial Commission
- Member of the Pontifical Commission for Latin America
- Member of the Congregation for the Doctrine of the Faith
- Member of the Pontifical Council for the Laity
- Member of the Council for the Public Affairs of the Church

During the same time, Rigali also provided pastoral service to parishes and seminaries in Rome.

=== Archbishop of St. Louis ===
On January 25, 1994, John Paul II named Rigali as the seventh archbishop of St. Louis. Rigali was installed in St. Louis, Missouri, by Cardinal Bernardin Gantin on March 15, 1994.

Rigali became a member of the Knights of Columbus on November 7, 1994. During his tenure at St. Louis, Rigali showed a great interest in schools, visiting every Catholic high school in the archdiocese. However, Rigali opposed collective bargaining by teachers and opposed any efforts they made to unionize. Rigali was widely credited as an able administrator and effective fundraiser, although observers said that his popularity dimmed as his tenure continued.

In January 1999, Rigali hosted the visit of John Paul II to St. Louis. The pope reportedly decided to visit the archdiocese because of his longtime close friendship with Rigali in Rome.

According to the St. Louis Business Journal, Rigali "brought financial stability to the St. Louis Archdiocese, overseeing successful capital campaigns to address immediate needs and raising endowment funds for the future."

=== Archbishop of Philadelphia ===
Rigali was appointed the eighth archbishop of Philadelphia by John Paul II on July 15, 2003. He was installed as archbishop on October 7, 2003. On September 28, 2003, the Vatican elevated Rigali to the College of Cardinals, a customary privilege for the archbishops of Philadelphia. Rigali was created as cardinal-priest of Santa Prisca in Rome during the consistory of October 21, 2003.

Rigali was the only American cardinal to serve as a concelebrant at the 2005 funeral Mass for John Paul II. He was also one of the cardinal electors who participated in the 2005 papal conclave, which selected Pope Benedict XVI.

In September 2007, Rigali was named by Pope Benedict XVI as a member of the Congregation for Bishops. On August 31, 2009, Benedict XVI appointed Rigali as the apostolic administrator to the Diocese of Scranton, following the resignations of Bishop Joseph Martino and Auxiliary Bishop John Dougherty. Rigali served eight months as the apostolic administrator.

On June 16, 2011, Benedict XVI appointed Rigali to serve as his special envoy to the celebrations at Prachatice in the Czech Republic for the 200th anniversary of the birth of Bishop John Neumann.

=== Retirement ===
On July 19, 2011, Benedict XVI accepted Rigali's resignation as archbishop of Philadelphia and named Archbishop Charles J. Chaput to succeed him. Chaput was installed as archbishop on September 8, 2011. Rigali then retired in residence at the Diocese of Knoxville. He was invited there by Bishop Richard Stika, with whom he shared living quarters.

Rigali participated in the 2013 conclave that selected Pope Francis. Rigali remained eligible to vote in conclaves until he reached 80 on April 19, 2015. In December 2013, Rigali retired from the Congregation for Bishops. During this period, Rigali participated in some activities in the Diocese of Nashville. In January 2023, Rigali was hospitalized in Knoxville, Tennessee, for a few days for an undisclosed medical condition. In 2023, he moved back to St. Louis.

=== Sexual abuse scandals ===
In October 2005, a grand jury empaneled in 2003 by Philadelphia District Attorney Lynne Abraham released a report on the cover-ups of sexual abuse by clergy in the archdiocese. In response to the report, Rigali stated that “no priests in ministry today who have an admitted or established allegation of sexual abuse of a minor against them.” However, some groups disputed the accuracy of that statement.

In 2007, a former Catholic high school student reported that he had been repeatedly molested by Bishop Michael J. Bransfield of the Diocese of Wheeling-Charleston. The alleged abuse took place when Bransfield was priest teaching Lansdale Catholic High School in Lansdale, Pennsylvania, during the 1970s. Rigali, then archbishop of Philadelphia, announced in October 2009 that the allegations could not be substantiated and took no action against Bransfield.

In 2011, Bransfield gave $1,000 to Rigali. Bransfield made other cash gifts to senior clerics in the archdiocese, including Monsignor Timothy C. Senior, the vicar for clergy. One of Bransfield's accusers said that Rigali and other archdiocesan officials "looked the other way" and failed to inform him about the church's handling of his complaint.

In early 2011, another grand jury in Philadelphia reported that the archdiocese was still negligent in its handling of sexual abuse accusations against clergy. In March 2011, Rigali suspended 21 priests in a single day, "prompting criticism that he should have alerted prosecutors sooner."

== Views ==
=== Same sex marriage ===
In June 2006, Rigali traveled to the White House along with Archbishop John J. Myers and Cardinal Seán Patrick O'Malley to attend a press conference by US President George W. Bush. The purpose was to support passage of the proposed Marriage Protection Amendment to the US Constitution in the United States Senate, which would ban civil unions and marriages by same sex couples. The amendment did not pass the senate in 2006 or in later years.

=== Abortion ===
As chair of the United States Conference of Catholic Bishops' Pro-Life Committee, he remarked during the annual Washington, DC, Pro life rally in January 2007 that there were "reasons for rejoicing" in the pro-life cause because more and more young people were working for the cause, and that there was a "growing moral sensitivity among them." In 2009, Rigali endorsed passage of the Pregnant Women Support Act in Congress. He praised the bill for offering "an authentic common ground" that will provide many kinds of life-affirming support for pregnant women and their unborn children. The bill did not pass congress.

=== Conscience rights ===
In November 2009, Rigali, along with other Catholic prelates and religious leaders from other denominations, signed the Manhattan Declaration. The document reiterated conservative viewpoints on marriage and religious freedom .

=== Stem cell research ===
In March 2009, Rigali described President Barack Obama's lifting of George W. Bush's restrictions on embryonic stem cell research as "a sad victory of politics over science and ethics."

=== Ordination of women ===
In April 2009, Rigali denounced the ordination ceremony of two Catholic women in Philadelphia, calling it a "pseudo-ordination" that "denigrates the truth entrusted to the Church by Christ himself." He excommunicated the two participants.

=== Communications ===
Rigali has run a weekly series of Lenten discourses on YouTube. In 2010, he established an official Facebook page.

== Charity work ==
Rigali is an honorary council member of the St. Louis, Missouri–based humanitarian organization Wings of Hope.

== See also ==
- Catholic Church in the United States
- Historical list of the Catholic bishops of the United States

Catholic Church titles
Preceded by Cesare Zacchi	President of the Pontifical Ecclesiastical Academy; 8 June 1985 – 21 December 1989	Succeeded by Karl-Josef Rauber
Preceded by Alfons Maria Stickler	— TITULAR — Titular Archbishop of Volsinium; 8 June 1985 – 25 January 1994	Succeeded by Justo Mullor García
Preceded by Giovanni Battista Re	Secretary for the Congregation for Bishops; 21 December 1989 – 25 January 1994	Succeeded by Jorge María Mejía
Preceded by Giovanni Battista Re	Secretary of the College of Cardinals; 2 January 1990 – 25 January 1994	Succeeded by Jorge María Mejía
Preceded by John Lawrence May	Archbishop of Saint Louis; 25 January 1994 – 15 July 2003	Succeeded by Raymond Leo Burke
Preceded by Anthony Bevilacqua	Archbishop of Philadelphia; 15 July 2003 – 19 July 2011	Succeeded by Charles Joseph Chaput
Preceded by Alfonso López Trujillo	Cardinal-Priest of Santa Prisca; 21 October 2003 –	Incumbent
