= Confession: A Roman Catholic App =

IPhone app

- Screenshot showing logo
- Developer: Little i Apps
- Available in: n/a
- Type: Religious/Spiritual
- Website: http://www.littleiapps.com/confession/

Confession: A Roman Catholic App was an application (or "app") for the iPhone that was intended to guide members of the Catholic Church through the Sacrament of Penance, also known as confession or reconciliation. According to the developers, the app did not replace confession in person before a priest, but was intended to help Catholics determine what sins they may have committed, as well as guide them through the appropriate prayers in the sacrament. The app is no longer available for download.

The app was published by Little i Apps, and received a nihil obstat from Michael Heintz, PhD, and an imprimatur from Kevin C. Rhoades, the bishop of Fort Wayne-South Bend. The app was developed by alumni of Franciscan University of Steubenville.
