= Timothy C. Senior =

American Catholic prelate (born 1960)

His Excellency, The Most Reverend Timothy Christian Senior
- Bishop of Harrisburg
- Church: Catholic
- Diocese: Harrisburg
- Appointed: April 25, 2023
- Installed: June 21, 2023
- Predecessor: Ronald William Gainer
- Previous post: Auxiliary Bishop of Philadelphia and Titular Bishop of Floriana (2009–2023)

Orders
- Ordination: May 18, 1985 by John Krol
- Consecration: July 31, 2009 by Justin Francis Rigali, Michael Joseph Bransfield, and Daniel Edward Thomas

Personal details
- Born: March 22, 1960 (age 66) North Wales, Pennsylvania, U.S.
- Education: St. Charles Borromeo Seminary; Boston College
- Motto: Scio cui credidi (Latin for 'I know whom I believed')

Styles of Timothy Christian Senior
- Reference style: His Excellency; The Most Reverend
- Spoken style: Your Excellency
- Religious style: Bishop

Timothy Christian Senior (born March 22, 1960) is an American Catholic prelate who has served as bishop of Harrisburg in Pennsylvania since 2023. He previously served as an auxiliary bishop of the Archdiocese of Philadelphia in Pennsylvania from 2009 to 2023, as well as rector and later chancellor of St. Charles Borromeo Seminary in Pennsylvania.

== Biography ==
=== Early life and education ===
Timothy Senior was born on March 22, 1960, in North Wales, Pennsylvania, to James Harwood and Elise (née Rothwell) Senior. The youngest of three children, he has a brother, Jim, and a sister, Myra. He attended St. Rose of Lima Elementary School and graduated from Lansdale Catholic High School in Lansdale, Pennsylvania, in 1977.

Having decided to become a priest, Senior entered St. Charles Borromeo Seminary in Philadelphia, obtaining a Bachelor of Arts degree in philosophy degree in 1981.

=== Ordination and ministry ===
Senior was ordained to the priesthood for the Archdiocese of Philadelphia by Cardinal John Krol on May 18, 1985. After his 1985 ordination, the archdiocese assigned Senior as parochial vicar at Assumption of the Blessed Virgin Mary Parish in Feasterville, Pennsylvania.

Senior returned to St. Charles Borromeo in 1988 to continue his graduate studies, receiving Master of Divinity and Master of Arts in pastoral theology degrees that same year. For part of 1988, he taught religion at Archbishop Kennedy High School in Conshohocken, Pennsylvania.

In 1989, Senior went to Boston, Massachusetts to attend Boston College. During his time in Boston, Senior also worked as executive assistant to the secretary for social services in the Archdiocese of Boston. He received Master of Social Work and Master of Business Administration degrees from Boston College in 1992.

On returning to Philadelphia, Senior worked as deputy secretary for Catholic Human Services from 1992 to 1997, when he became secretary. In this position, he oversaw the governance and operation of the network of Catholic health care and social services ministries sponsored by the archdiocese. Senior was raised to the rank of chaplain to his holiness by Pope John Paul II in 1998, and prelate of honor in 2005. In 2004, Senior was named archdiocesan vicar for clergy by Cardinal Justin Rigali. In addition to his duties as vicar, he resided at and served as chaplain at Divine Providence Village, a facility for people with intellectual disabilities, in Springfield, Pennsylvania.

=== Auxiliary Bishop of Philadelphia ===
Coat of arms as auxiliary bishop of Philadelphia

On June 8, 2009, Senior was appointed as an auxiliary bishop of Philadelphia and titular bishop of Floriana by Pope Benedict XVI. Senior received his episcopal consecration on July 31, 2009, from Rigali, with Bishops Michael Bransfield and Daniel E. Thomas acting as co-consecrators, at the Cathedral Basilica of Ss. Peter and Paul in Philadelphia.

From 2009 to 2012, Senior served as the moderator of the curia for the archdiocese. In July 2012, Archbishop Charles J. Chaput appointed Senior as rector of St. Charles Borromeo Seminary. In July 2022, Archbishop Nelson J. Pérez appointed Senior as chancellor of that seminary and gave him responsibility for the seminary's move to Lower Gwynedd Township.

=== Bishop of Harrisburg ===
On April 25, 2023, Pope Francis appointed Senior as bishop of Harrisburg, succeeding Bishop Ronald Gainer. He was installed on June 21, 2023, at the Cathedral of Saint Patrick.

== See also ==
- Catholic Church hierarchy
- Catholic Church in the United States
- Historical list of the Catholic bishops of the United States
- List of the Catholic bishops of the United States
- Lists of patriarchs, archbishops, and bishops

Catholic Church titles
Preceded by Ronald William Gainer	Bishop of Harrisburg; 2023–present	Succeeded by Incumbent
Preceded by –	Auxiliary Bishop of Philadelphia; 2009–2023	Succeeded by –
