= James Kendrick Williams =

American prelate of the Catholic Church (born 1936)

His Excellency, The Most Reverend James Kendrick Williams
- Bishop Emeritus of Lexington
- Archdiocese: Louisville
- Diocese: Lexington
- Appointed: January 14, 1988
- Installed: March 2, 1988
- Retired: June 11, 2002
- Predecessor: First Bishop
- Successor: Ronald William Gainer
- Previous post: Auxiliary Bishop of Covington and Titular Bishop of Catula (1984–88)

Orders
- Ordination: May 25, 1963 by Charles Garrett Maloney
- Consecration: June 19, 1984 by William Anthony Hughes, Thomas C. Kelly, and Richard Henry Ackerman

Personal details
- Born: September 5, 1936 (age 89) Athertonville, Kentucky
- Education: St. Mary College; St. Mary School of Theology
- Motto: Act justly, love tenderly

Styles of James Kendrick Williams
- Reference style: His Excellency; The Most Reverend
- Spoken style: Your Excellency
- Religious style: Bishop

James Kendrick Williams (born September 5, 1936, also known as J. Kendrick Williams) is an American prelate of the Roman Catholic Church who was bishop of Diocese of Lexington in Kentucky from 1988 to 2002. Williams previously served as an auxiliary bishop of the Diocese of Covington in Kentucky.

Williams resigned as bishop of Lexington in 2002 after three men accused him of child sexual abuse.

== Biography ==
=== Early life ===
Williams was born on September 5, 1936, in Athertonville, Kentucky. He attended Old Kentucky Home High School in Bardstown, Kentucky, then went to St. Mary College in St. Mary, Kentucky, and St. Mary School of Theology at South Union, Kentucky.

=== Priesthood ===
On May 25, 1963. Williams was ordained a priest for the Archdiocese of Louisville at the Cathedral of the Assumption in Louisville, Kentucky, by Bishop Charles Maloney. After his ordination, Williams served as associate director of the archdiocesan Office of Religious Education, the vicar of education for four parishes, president of the Town and Country Apostolic Council, director of the Rural Office of Religious Education, director of the Archdiocesan Planning Office, director of the Clergy Personnel Commission, and associate pastor of several parishes. In 1983, Williams was appointed pastor of Holy Trinity Parish in Louisville.

=== Auxiliary Bishop of Covington ===
On April 15, 1984, Pope John Paul II named Williams as titular bishop of Catula and auxiliary bishop of Covington. He was consecrated bishop on June 19, 1984, at Cathedral Basilica of the Assumption in Covington by Bishop William A. Hughes.

=== Bishop of Lexington ===
On January 14, 1988, John Paul II named Williams as the first bishop of Lexington. He was installed on March 2, 1988.

In 2002, Williams and the Archdiocese of Louisville faced three lawsuits from men who claimed that Williams abused them as minors when he was a priest serving in the archdiocese. Williams denied all the allegations.

- James W. Bennett of Louisville stated that Williams fondled and kissed him after mass in 1981 when Bennett was a 12-year-old altar server at Our Lady Parish in Louisville.
- David Hall of New Haven, Kentucky, stated that Williams fondled him in 1969 at St. Catherine High School during confession.
- Thomas C. Probus stated that Williams emotionally abused him by promoting masturbation during counseling at several locations at Holy Trinity Parish in Louisville around 1981.

=== Resignation ===
After the accusations from Louisville, Williams went on leave as bishop of Lexington, following the diocese policy. On June 11, 2002, John Paul II accepted Williams' resignation as bishop of Lexington without giving any reasons for it. In 2019, the Archdiocese of Louisville revealed that the accusations against Williams had been sent to the Vatican for investigation.

== See also ==
- Catholic Church hierarchy
- Catholic Church in the United States
- Historical list of the Catholic bishops of the United States
- List of Catholic bishops of the United States
- Lists of patriarchs, archbishops, and bishops

== Episcopal succession ==
Catholic Church titles
Preceded by First Bishop	Bishop of Lexington; 1988–2002	Succeeded by Ronald William Gainer
Preceded by -	Auxiliary Bishop of Covington; 1984–1988	Succeeded by -
