= Joseph P. McFadden =

American prelate (1947–2013)

His Excellency, The Most Reverend Joseph Patrick McFadden
- Bishop of Harrisburg
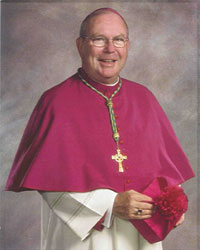
- Province: Philadelphia
- Diocese: Harrisburg
- Installed: August 18, 2010
- Term ended: May 2, 2013
- Predecessor: Kevin C. Rhoades
- Successor: Ronald William Gainer

Orders
- Ordination: May 16, 1981 by John Krol
- Consecration: July 28, 2004 by Justin Francis Rigali

Personal details
- Born: May 22, 1947 West Philadelphia, Pennsylvania, US
- Died: May 2, 2013 (aged 65) Philadelphia, Pennsylvania, US
- Denomination: Roman Catholic Church
- Motto: Mary the model, Jesus the center

Styles of Joseph Patrick McFadden
- Reference style: The Most Reverend
- Spoken style: Your Excellency
- Religious style: Monsignor

Joseph Patrick McFadden (May 22, 1947 – May 2, 2013) was an American prelate of the Roman Catholic Church. Formerly an auxiliary bishop of the Archdiocese of Philadelphia in Pennsylvania, he was installed as bishop of Harrisburg in Pennsylvania on August 18, 2010. He served in that position until his death in 2013.

== Early life and education ==
Joseph McFadden was born on May 22, 1947, in West Philadelphia, Pennsylvania, to Thomas and Ellen (née Griffin) McFadden. His parents were Irish immigrants, and one of his sisters is a member of the Sisters Servants of the Immaculate Heart of Mary.

McFadden received his early education at the parochial school of Our Lady of Lourdes Parish in Philadelphia. He then attended St. Thomas More High School for Boys in Philadelphia from 1961 to 1965. At St. Thomas, he was a member of the National Honor Society, a player on the varsity basketball team, and the class valedictorian.

McFadden then attended St. Joseph's University in Philadelphia, where he earned a Bachelor of Science degree in politics in 1969. He played on the freshmen basketball team at St. Joseph's, and also coached at St. Thomas More High School and West Catholic Boys High School in West Philadelphia. Following his graduation from St. Joseph's, McFadden joined the faculty of West Catholic Boys High School, where he taught social studies. In addition to his teaching duties, he coached the junior varsity basketball team and served as the school's athletic director.

In 1976, McFadden decided to study for the priesthood, a vocation he had considered "through high school and when [he] went to college." That year he entered St. Charles Borromeo Seminary in Philadelphia, where he earned a Master of Divinity degree summa cum laude.

== Priesthood ==
On May 16, 1981, McFadden was ordained a priest for the Archdiocese of Philadelphia by Cardinal John Krol at the Cathedral Basilica of SS. Peter and Paul in Philadelphia. His first assignment was as a parochial vicar at St. Laurence Church in Highland Park, where he remained for one year. From 1982 to 1993, he served as administrative secretary to Cardinal Krol. The Vatican named McFadden as an honorary prelate on May 29, 1991.

It was during McFadden's service as Krol's secretary to Krol that the archbishop allegedly excused and enabled the sexual abuse of hundreds of children within the archdiocese.

In 1993, McFadden was appointed as the first president of Cardinal O'Hara High School in Springfield, Pennsylvania. During his eight-year tenure, he increased the school's enrollment from 1,540 students to 2,000 students, and initiated the "Laptops for Learning" program. From 2001 to 2004, he served as pastor of St. Joseph's Church in Downingtown.

In addition to his academic and pastoral duties, he served as chaplain to the Serra Club (1987–2001) and the Ancient Order of Hibernians (1986–1995), spiritual director of St. Charles Borromeo Seminary, and director of the archdiocesan pilgrimages to the National Shrine of the Immaculate Conception in Washington, D.C.

== Episcopacy ==
=== Auxiliary Bishop of Philadelphia ===
On June 28, 2004, McFadden was appointed auxiliary bishop of Philadelphia and titular bishop of Horreomargum by Pope John Paul II. He received his episcopal consecration on July 28, 2004, from Cardinal Justin Francis Rigali, with Bishops Robert P. Maginnis and Michael Francis Burbidge serving as co-consecrators, at the Cathedral Basilica of SS. Peter and Paul. He selected as his episcopal motto: "Mary the Model - Jesus the Center".

Later that year, McFadden expressed his opposition to the holding of a gay rights event at Saint Joseph's University, saying, "While the Church asks that we recognize the unique dignity of every human person, it does not mean supporting a lifestyle that is contrary to the natural law".

As an auxiliary bishop, McFadden headed the Secretariat of Catholic Education in the archdiocesan curia. As a member of the United States Conference of Catholic Bishops, he served on the Committee on Catholic Education and the Task Force on Faith Formation and Sacramental Practice. McFadden played a pivotal role in closing both Northeast Catholic High School for boys and Cardinal Dougherty High School.

=== Bishop of Harrisburg ===
On June 22, 2010, McFadden was appointed the tenth bishop of Harrisburg by Pope Benedict XVI. His installation took place on August 18, 2010.

McFadden died suddenly in Philadelphia on May 2, 2013, while attending a meeting of the Catholic bishops from Pennsylvania.

=== Removal of name in Diocese of Harrisburg ===
On August 1, 2018, Bishop Ronald Gainer, McFadden's successor as bishop of Harrisburg, announced that the names of every bishop of Harrisburg from 1947 onward—including McFadden's -- will be removed from any building or room in the diocese named in their honor, due to their failure to protect victims from abuse.

Catholic Church titles
Preceded by Kevin C. Rhoades	Bishop of Harrisburg; 2010–2013	Succeeded by Ronald William Gainer
Preceded by –	Auxiliary Bishop of Philadelphia; 2004–2010	Succeeded by –
