= Charles Garrett Maloney =

Styles of Charles Maloney
- Reference style: The Most Reverend
- Spoken style: Your Excellency
- Religious style: Bishop
- Posthumous style: none

Charles Garrett Maloney (9 September 1913 – 30 April 2006) served as the auxiliary bishop of Louisville and titular bishop of Bardstown, Kentucky.

== Education ==
Maloney attended high school and college at Saint Joseph's College in Rensselaer, Indiana, where he graduated summa cum laude. He later attended the Pontifical North American College in Rome, Italy, where he was eventually ordained.

== Ministry ==
Maloney was ordained a priest in 1937. On 30 December 1954 Pope Pius XII appointed Maloney the auxiliary bishop of the Roman Catholic Archdiocese of Louisville; he served in the capacity for 51 years. He was consecrated as a Roman Catholic bishop in 1955 by Archbishop John Alexander Floersh at the Cathedral of the Assumption in Louisville, Kentucky. Also in 1954, he was appointed bishop of the titular see of Capsa. Later he was appointed as the first titular bishop of the diocese of Bardstown, Kentucky, a diocese founded in 1808 but later moved to Louisville.

== Second Vatican Council ==
As of 1995, His Excellency was one of only eight United States bishops still living who participated in the Second Vatican Council. Maloney participated in all four sessions of the council from 1962 to 1965. He was influential in the passage of Dignitatis humanae (Declaration on Religious Freedom), one of only sixteen documents generated by the council and approved by the Pope. Ironically, Bishop Maloney often said the traditional Latin Mass during his retirement at Saint Martin of Tours Church in Louisville.

== See also ==
- Basilica of Saint Joseph Proto-Cathedral
- Cathedral of the Assumption (Louisville)
- Capsa (see)

== Episcopal succession ==
Catholic Church titles
Preceded by none	Titular bishop of Bardstown (Ky.); 2005–2006	Succeeded by Daniel Edward Thomas
Preceded by Blessed Laurent-Joseph-Marius Imbert	Titular bishop of Capsa (North Africa); 1954–2005	Succeeded by Adalberto Paulo da Silva
