= Hager Hill, Kentucky =

Unincorporated community in Kentucky, United States

- Unincorporated community
- Location within Kentucky Location within the United States
- Coordinates: 37°46′33″N 82°48′07″W
- Country: United States
- State: Kentucky
- County: Johnson

Population (2000)
  - Total: 1,780
- Time zone: UTC-5 (Eastern (EST))
  - Summer (DST): UTC-4 (EDT)
- ZIP codes: 41222

Hager Hill (also Hagerhill) is an unincorporated community in Johnson County, Kentucky, United States. Hager Hill is located approximately four miles south of Paintsville, the county seat of Johnson County.

== History ==
A post office was established in the community in 1903. The origins of the place name Hager Hill (or Hagerhill) are unclear: Some hold it was named for local farmer and minister Daniel Mart Hager, while others believe it was named for the hilltop home of Sam Hager.

== Demographics ==
As of the census of 2000, there were 1,780 people, 692 households and 534 families residing in the ZIP Code Tabulation Area (ZCTA) for Hager Hill's ZIP code.

The racial makeup of the ZCTA was 99.0% White, 0.1% African American, 0.3% Native American, 0.1% Asian and 0.4% from two or more races. Hispanic or Latino of any race were 0.8% of the population.

In the ZCTA there were 692 households, out of which 56.06% had children under the age of 18 living with them, 47.68% were married couples living together, 6.5% had a female householder with no husband present, and 25.14% were non-families. 23.12% of all households were made up of individuals, and the average family size was 2.96.

The median income for a household in the ZCTA was $24,352 (as of 1999), and the median income for a family was $28,625. Males had a median income of $34,342 versus $20,446 for females. The per capita income for the ZCTA was $12,427. About 21.0% of families and 25.4% of the population were below the poverty line, including 32.0% of those under age 18 and 15.3% of those age 65 or over.

== Schools ==
The following schools are located within the community of Hager Hill:

- Porter Elementary School
- The Piarist School (Martin, Kentucky) a private, Roman Catholic college preparatory school.
- Big Sandy Community and Technical College (Hager Hill Campus)

Most high school students living in Hager Hill attend Johnson Central High School or Paintsville High School, located in nearby Paintsville.

== Notable residents ==
- Richard S. Thomas
