= Basilica of St. Joseph Proto-Cathedral =

Catholic church

Coordinates: 37.810833°N 85.472222°W

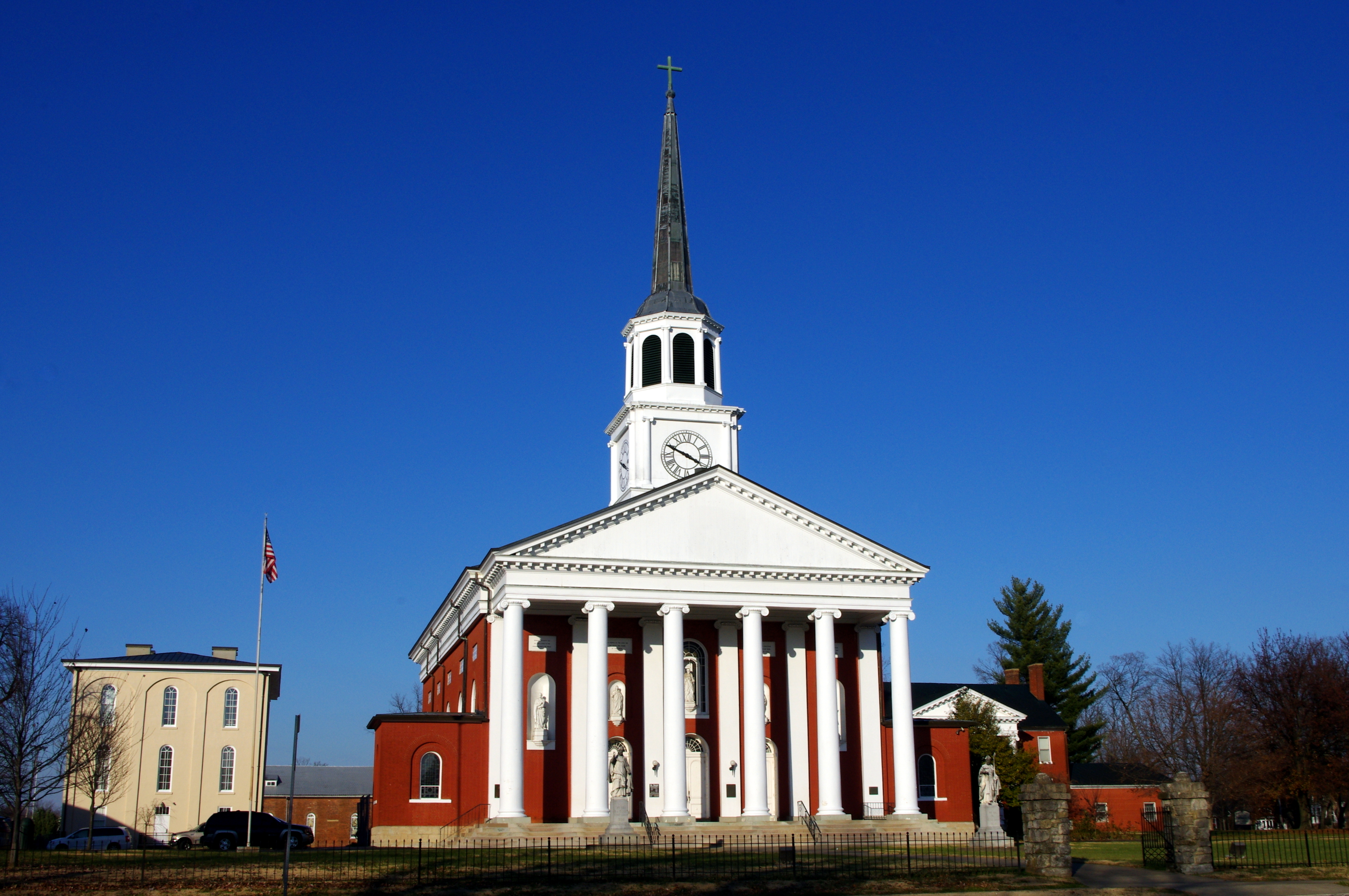
- Façade of Proto-Cathedral

General information
- Architectural style: Greek Revival
- Location: Bardstown, Kentucky, United States
- Completed: 1823
- Client: Roman Catholic Archdiocese of New York

Design and construction
- Architect: John Rogers of Baltimore.

The Basilica of Saint Joseph Proto-Cathedral is a Catholic parish church at 310 West Stephen Foster Avenue in Bardstown, Kentucky. It is the original cathedral of the present Roman Catholic Archdiocese of Louisville, originally erected as the Diocese of Bardstown — "proto-cathedral" means the original cathedral of a see that has transferred or moved. During its years as a cathedral, the pastor was Benedict Joseph Flaget, the first bishop of Bardstown.

== Construction ==
The cornerstone was laid on July 16, 1816, with construction beginning thereafter. Materials used for its construction were found in the immediate area. The architect and builder was John Rogers of Baltimore. By 1819 it was sufficiently completed for Mass to be held. The interior was fully complete by 1823. Many of the paintings and interior decorations were donated by Pope Leo XII, King Louis-Philippe of France and others. The gift from the King of France included paintings by Murillo, Van Dyke and others. Gifts of royal embroidered vestments—the handwork of the queen and her court—and sacramental vessels were also made.

== Paintings from King Louis ==
- The Crucifixion, Phillippe Van Bree
- Descent of the Holy Ghost, Van Eyck
- The Winged St. Mark, Van Dyck
- St. Peter in Chains, Van Dyck
- St. John the Baptist, Van Dyck
- The Coronation in Heaven of the Mother of God, Murillo
- The Annunciation, Van Eyck
- Teaching the Boys, artist unknown

On November 12, 1952, nine of the paintings were stolen. Thieves entered the church in the middle of the night and cut the paintings from their frames. The stolen paintings were: “The Flaying of St. Bartholomew,” “The Coronation,” “The Descent of the Holy Ghost,” “St. Anne,” “The Blessed Virgin,” and four Stations of the Cross. The paintings were recovered by the F.B.I. in April 1953. Four were found rolled up in the trunk of a car in Chicago, and five had been purchased by a New York buyer. The paintings remained in good condition. Twelve men were arrested in connection with the robbery, but only one, Norton Kretske, was sentenced. His conviction was overturned by the U.S. Supreme Court due to lack of evidence. The paintings were returned in 1957 and were rehung in the church in 1958.

== Painting from King Francis I of the Two Sicilies ==
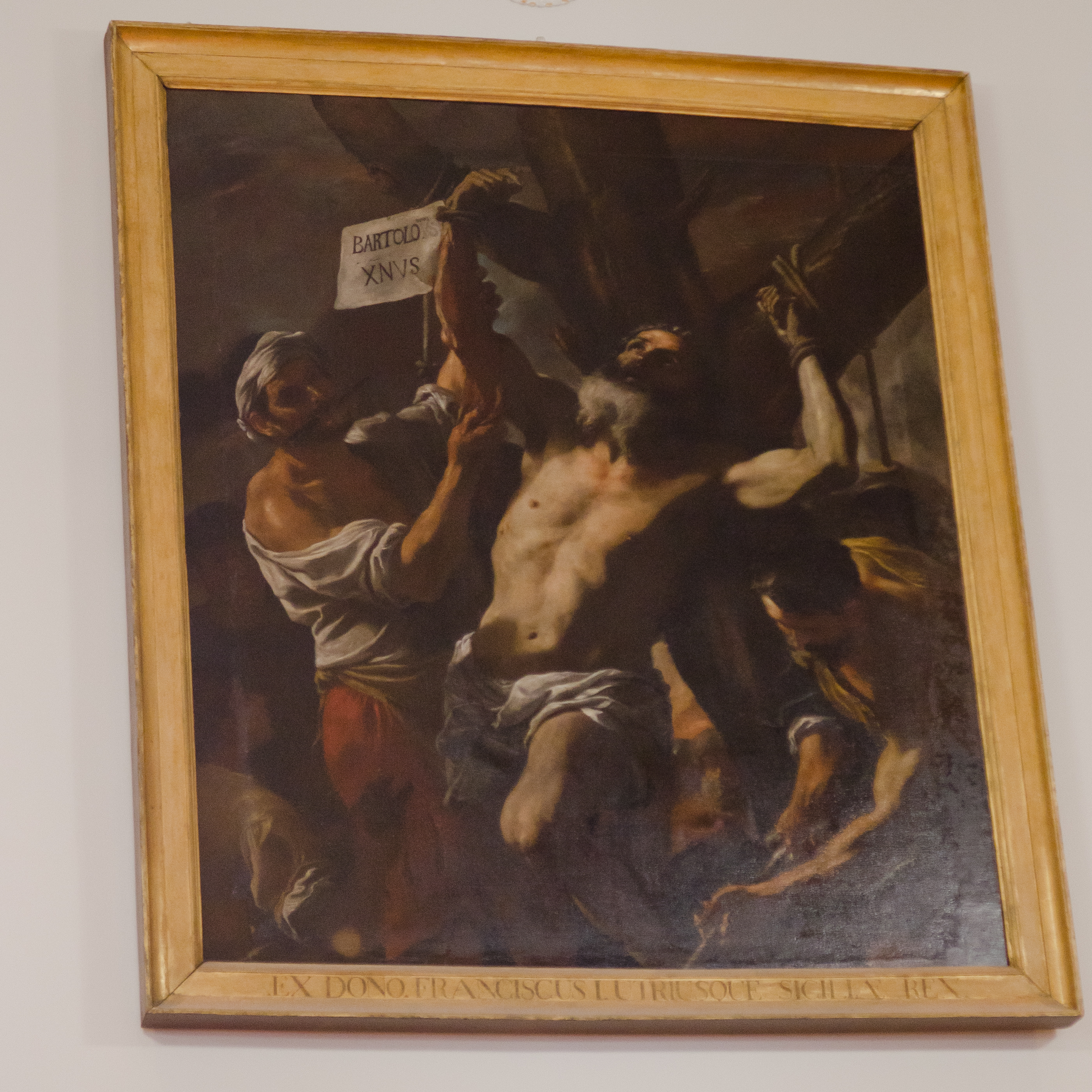
The Martyrdom of St. Bartholomew, Mattia Preti

The Martyrdom of St. Bartholomew, Mattia Preti, was painted in Naples around 1650. In the early 19th century, King Francis I of the Two Sicilies made a gift of the picture to the Saint Joseph Proto-Cathedral in Bardstown, Kentucky, where it remains to this day. After suffering many years of neglect and misguided restorations (including complete over-painting of the surface in the 1950s), the picture was sent to the Getty for study and development of a plan for treatment. Two years of difficult work have restored the picture, and the exceptional character and quality of the original is once again visible. The painting was returned to Bardstown in time for re-consecration of the Proto-Cathedral as a Basilica in August, 2002.

== Historical significance ==
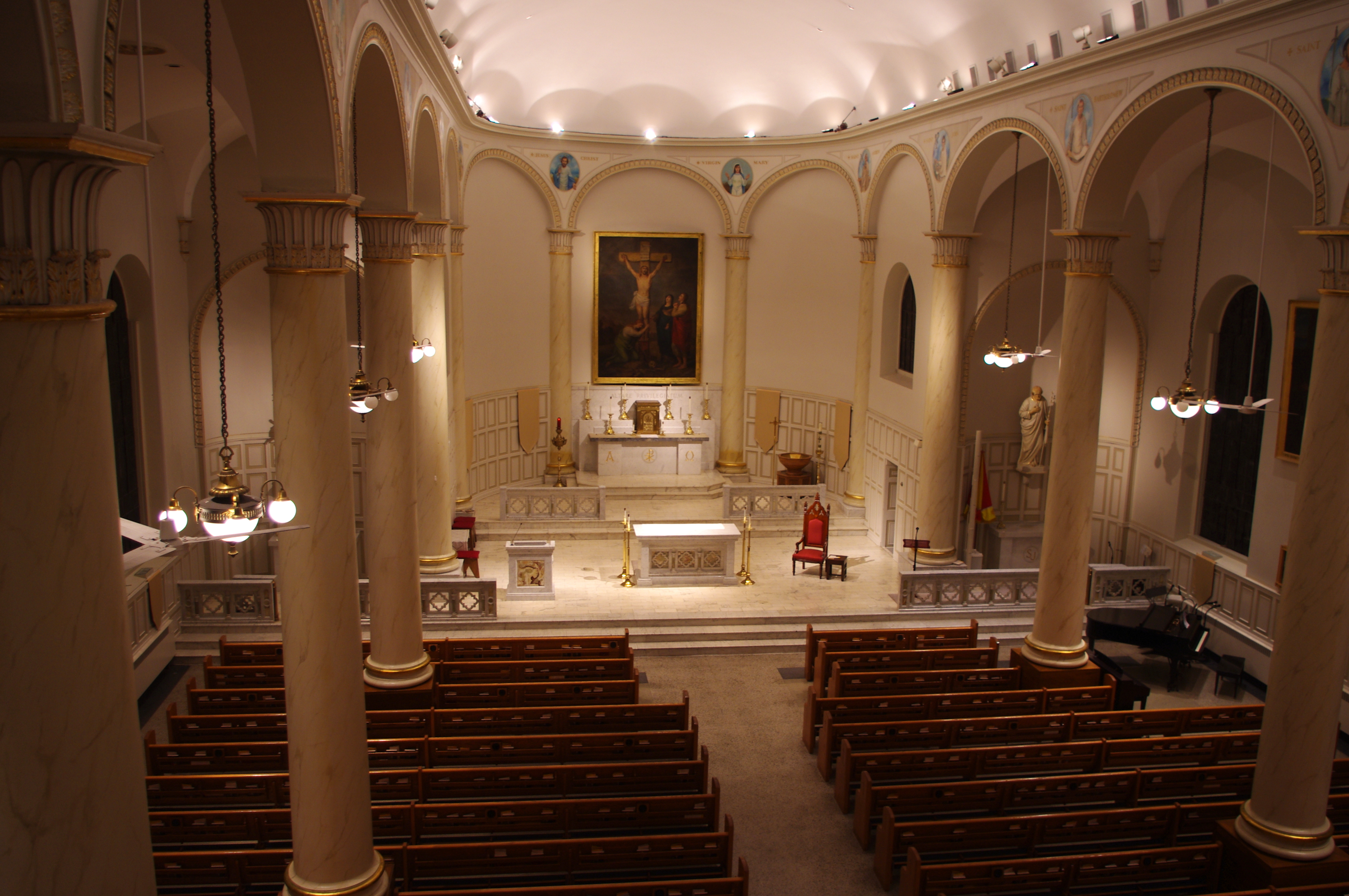
Interior showing altar

The proto-cathedral is the first Catholic Cathedral west of the Allegheny Mountains. On January 9, 1974, the proto-cathedral was listed on the National Register of Historic Places. On June 3, 1976, the listing was expanded to include the adjacent Spalding Hall and Flaget Hall, originally St. Joseph College.

Over time, the location of the cornerstone was lost, until 1980 when it was uncovered during restoration of part of the building.

On July 18, 2001, Pope John Paul II elevated it to the honor of a minor basilica church and an umbraculum was installed at the altar.

One of the most famous people from this church is Daniel Rudd. Daniel Rudd (August 7, 1854 – 1933) was a Catholic journalist and civil rights leader who lived his early years in Bardstown, Kentucky on Anatok Plantation, where he was born into slavery. Daniel Rudd was born on August 7, 1854, in Bardstown, Kentucky to slave parents Robert and Elizabeth Rudd. Rudd and all 11 of his siblings were baptized in the Catholic church. Rudd was very religious, and it is unknown at what point in his life he decided to make it his life's work. Daniel Rudd moved to Springfield, Ohio in 1881 and stayed there until 1886. His journalism career started at the Sunday News. While Rudd was working at the Sunday News, he was a printer, reporter, and editor who was interested in following a Frederick Douglass-like advocacy that was aimed at protecting the civil rights of African Americans. He believed that the press played a large role in black advancement. Rudd also thought that editors and journalists had the ability to persuade and educate Catholic, business and civic leaders. In 1885 Rudd began his first Catholic newspaper called the Ohio Tribune, he later changed the name to the American Catholic Tribune. This newspaper became the first black owned and operated national Catholic newspaper. After he founded his own newspapers, including the American Catholic Tribune in 1887, Rudd began believing that the newspaper was important in promoting the church as a transformational institution that was capable of bringing equality and social justice for African Americans. He was less concerned with the equality and social justice for other minorities such as Mexican Americans, Native Americans, and Chinese Americans. “Cardinal Gibbons, arch-bishop of Baltimore, Md., the most Reverend Archbishops of Cincinnati and Philadelphia, and the Right Reverend Bishops of Covington, Ky., Columbus, OH., Richmond, Va., Vincennes, Ind., and Wilmington, Del.” were all listed on the master head of the newspaper as bishops who endorsed the newspaper. After only a short year Daniel moved the company to Cincinnati, where he started featuring articles that spoke out on black issues such as segregation and discrimination. Rudd's mission and philosophy came through: “The Catholic Church alone can break the color line. Our people should help her to do it.”

== Diocese of Bardstown ==
The Diocese of Bardstown was erected into an Episcopal See April 8, 1808 by the Holy See. This diocese was the first inland diocese in the United States. The primal see or proto-Diocese of the United States, the Diocese of Baltimore, was subdivided into the dioceses of Boston, New York, Philadelphia, and Bardstown (Baltimore becoming the Archdiocese of Baltimore).

The See of the diocese of Bardstown was moved to Louisville in 1841, and St. Joseph's was replaced as Cathedral by St. Louis Church (now the Cathedral of the Assumption) on Fifth Street in Downtown Louisville. St. Joseph's therefore became the "proto" or first cathedral. The Diocese of Louisville was elevated to Archdiocese in 1939.

In 1995, the Holy See honored the proto-cathedral by naming retired Bishop Charles G. Maloney the Titular Bishop of Bardstown. Maloney died on April 30, 2006. He was succeeded by Bishop Daniel E. Thomas on June 8, 2006. James Massa became the third Titular Bishop of Bardstown in 2015.

== See also ==
- List of Catholic cathedrals in the United States
- List of cathedrals in the United States
- List of attractions and events in the Louisville metropolitan area
