= The Piarist School (Martin, Kentucky) =

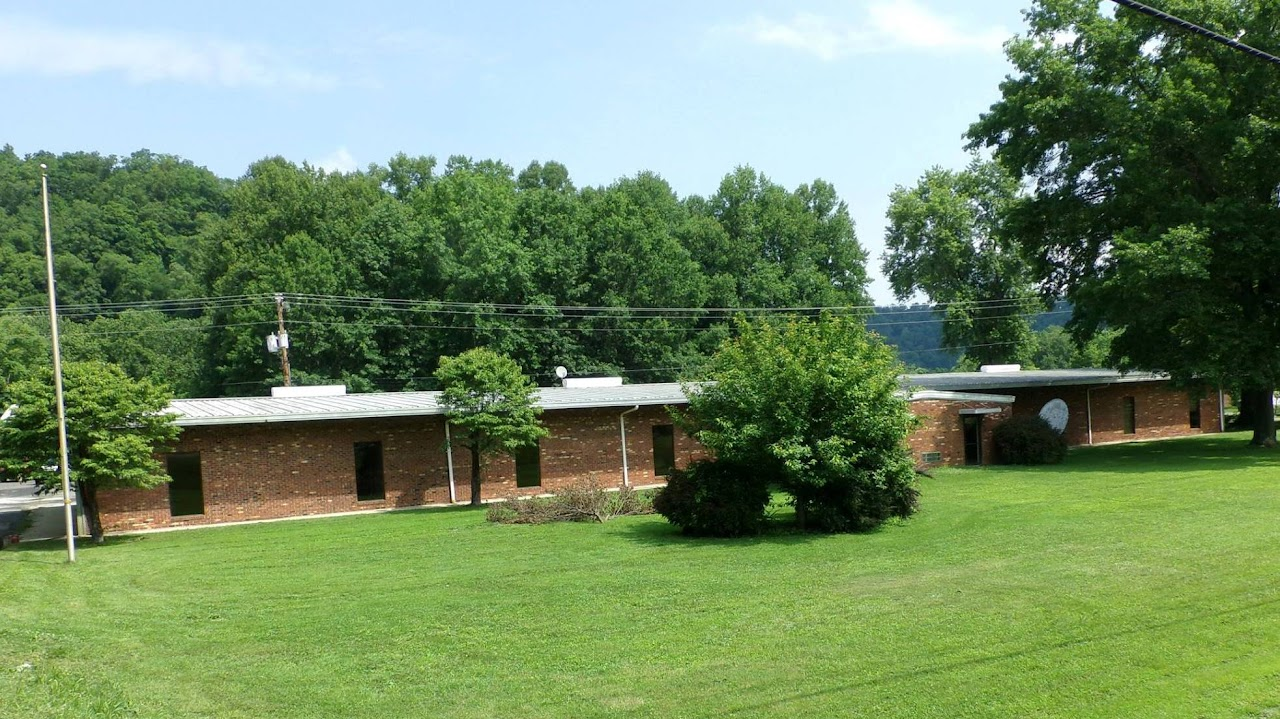

Location
- 7279 State Rt. 321, Box 369; Hager Hill, (Johnson County), Kentucky 41222; United States; 37°45′21″N 82°46′41″W

Information
- School type: Private, Coeducational College Preparatory
- Religious affiliation: Roman Catholic
- Established: 1990
- School code: 290589
- Grades: 6–12
- Age: 11 to 18
  - Grade 6: 5
  - Grade 7: 4
  - Grade 8: 10
  - Grade 9: 7
  - Grade 10: 11
  - Grade 11: 11
  - Grade 12: 4
- Average class size: 12
- Student to teacher ratio: 6:1
- Colors: Royal Blue and Gold
- Team name: Knights
- Tuition: Tuition-free
- Outreach Coordinator: Audrey Collins
- Headmaster: Rev. John Callan, Sch.P.
- Website: School Website

The Piarist School is a private, Roman Catholic college preparatory school in Hagerhill, Kentucky. It is operated by The Piarist Fathers (Piarists) independent of and with the blessing and spiritual support of the Roman Catholic Diocese of Lexington. The present school is the second location for the Piarist School which began in 1990 in Martin, Kentucky.

== Background ==
The Piarist School is a small, 'tuition-free college preparatory school serving students in Floyd, Knott, Pike, Johnson, Lawrence, and Magoffin counties of Kentucky since 1990. The original 1994 graduating class consisted of only three seniors. Today, approximately 52 students in grades 6–12 attend the school. Students must pass an entrance examination, which is administered in the Spring, before being admitted to the School.

In the spring of 1988, the Provincial Chapter of the American Province of the Piarist Fathers voted to send two priests to work in Appalachia to pursue the work of the Piarists in the field of education. The initial contact person in the newly formed Diocese of Lexington was Monsignor Ralph Briting. He was the creator of a project to evangelize eastern Kentucky called the Christian Appalachian Project (CAP). Rev. Thomas Carroll, Sch.P. arrived in Prestonsburg, Kentucky on September 12, 1988. Initially, he stayed at the rectory at St. Martha Parish, and he was joined the following year by Rev. David Powers, Sch.P. who also went to eastern Kentucky to work in the newly established diocese of Lexington. There was a school building located next to Mountain Christian Academy in Martin, that was closed, and the Piarist Fathers agreed to rent that building from The Christian Appalachian Project for a nominal yearly amount. From the very beginning, the school was tuition-free. To pay the expenses, the fathers relied on grants, donations, and income from making mission calls. The Piarist School opened in August 1990 to serve all those desiring a quality education within a Christian setting. They were joined in February 1991 by Rev. Leonard Gendernalik, Sch.P. and later in 1992 by Rev. Stephen Bendik, Sch.P. All four Piarist Fathers had previously been teaching at Devon Preparatory School in Devon, Pennsylvania.

Taking into account the extreme poverty of the people and keeping the charisma of St. Joseph Calasanz in mind, the Piarists decided the school would be tuition-free and dependent on the charitable contributions of the people of God for its existence.

The Piarist School opened with one freshman class and three priests. The following year, Mr. Ken Rose was hired as the first lay faculty member to teach history. The school added a class each year until the 1993–1994 school year when the school had its first four-year program. The School added a middle-school program in 2009.

Today, The Piarist School is accredited by the Kentucky Department of Non-Public Schools and is a Kentucky High School Athletic Association member. The School also offers a good selection of extracurricular activities including the Student Council, National Honor Society, Academic Team, Spanish Club, Chess Club, Drama Club, Science Olympiad, and Knights for Christ. The School also provides free transportation for those students living in certain areas of need. Since its first graduating class, 100 percent of all graduates have attended college, many having received significant scholarships. In 2009, the Piarist School began a middle school program by adding the seventh and eighth grades to the high school program. It added a sixth grade the following year. The school moved from its Martin location to its present location in Johnson County after the 2014–2015 school year.

Besides the Academic component, The School also has an Outreach Program for the poor. The School website states that "Piarist Outreach completes the mission of the school. It complements the School's academic endeavors, and the Outreach Program connects those in need in Eastern Kentucky with the help offered by others throughout The United States." Mrs. Audrey Collins currently heads the Outreach Program. Throughout the year, numerous benefactors send gifts of clothing, canned food, school supplies, Christmas gifts, and other needed items. The Program provides school supplies to the Piarist School students as well as to many public school Family Resource Centers, and Mrs. Collins works with numerous churches and local social service organizations to distribute food and clothing to the needy. Each year the Outreach Program, assisted by numerous groups, provides Christmas gifts to hundreds of underprivileged children from three different counties. This program is expanding each year.

The school also hosts many volunteer groups who come to eastern Kentucky to repair and paint houses, build wheelchair ramps, and complete other home repair projects as needed. These volunteers are usually housed at the former Oddfellows Youth Camp in Prestonsburg, at which Mrs. Collins serves as the volunteer caretaker. But perhaps the most telling facet of the Outreach Program is the number of parishes and volunteers wanting to work with the School from around the country. Numerous parishes contact Mrs. Collins to coordinate donations for both the School's students as well as the people of the surrounding area, or to coordinate the services of those volunteers who travel to the area and work hard on projects that benefit the people served by the Program. Such services include providing food, clothing, assistance to burn-out victims, school supplies, Christmas presents, household items to needy families, and the operation of the Summer Emergency Home Repair Project. Volunteer groups usually spend a week working on various Outreach projects.

The Mission Statement of The Piarist School is that "The Piarist School provides a college preparatory education, involving the development of an educational community which includes parents, teachers, students, and members of the local community as co-workers in promoting the physical, intellectual, and spiritual growth of the students. The School is not just a place for the conveyance of subject matter to objects to be educated, but is one where the creativity needed for continuous renewal of society thrives and where formal and non-formal education are so integrated that the School becomes a center for social and cultural activities."

== Athletics ==
The School's first Athletic Director was Theresa Kelly, a two-time Three Rivers Conference Cross-Country Coach of the Year while at The Piarist School.

The School's first league conference championship was winning the 2001 Three Rivers Conference in golf under coach Kenneth Rose.

The School's fifth athletic director was Greg Friend, and he expanded the School's athletic program to include girls' volleyball. The high school Volleyball team has also had two players named to the All-State Team.

In 2008, Kevin Tackett became the new athletic director as well as the boys and girls basketball coach. In 2017, the Piarist Volleyknights were the East Kentucky Mountain Classic Champions. In October 2009, Coach Tackett organized his first MidKnight Madness, which is the school's big annual pep rally.

The School currently offers KHSAA sanctioned cross country and track and field, as well as NASP sanctioned Archery.

== Notes and references ==
The Piarist Fathers in the U.S.A. 60 Years of Service by Jose P. Burgues, Sch.P., Miami, 2007–2008

The Piarist School Self-Study For the Kentucky Non-Public School Commission, April 2013

The Piarist School Student Handbook, 2023–2024

ACT Report, June 29, 2021
