= Roman Catholic Diocese of Lexington =

Latin Catholic territory in Kentucky, US

Coordinates: 38°01′47″N 84°29′41″W

Diocese of Lexington Dioecesis Lexingtonensis
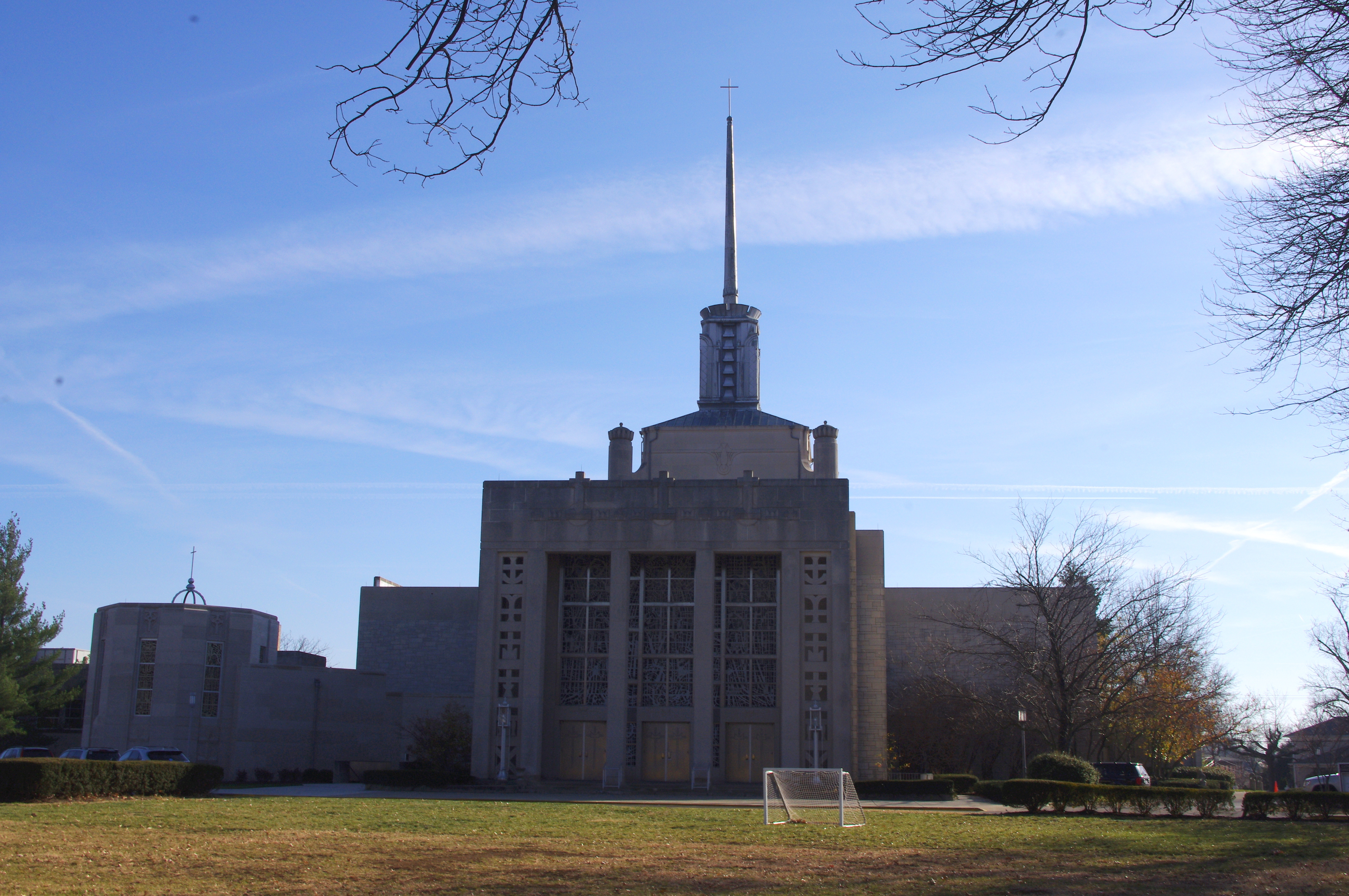
- Cathedral of Christ the King

- Coat of arms

Location
- Country: United States
- Territory: Southeastern Kentucky
- Ecclesiastical province: Louisville

Statistics
- Area: 16,423 sq mi (42,540 km^{2})
- Population: Total; Catholics: (as of 2017); 1,659,800; 43,168 (2.6%)

Information
- Denomination: Catholic Church
- Sui iuris church: Latin Church
- Rite: Roman Rite
- Established: January 14, 1988
- Cathedral: Cathedral of Christ the King

Current leadership
- Pope: Leo XIV
- Bishop: John Stowe
- Metropolitan Archbishop: Shelton Fabre
- Bishops emeritus: James Kendrick Williams

Map
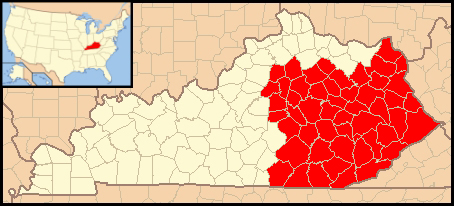

Website
- cdlex.org

The Diocese of Lexington (Latin: Dioecesis Lexingtonensis) is a Roman Catholic diocese in southeastern Kentucky in the United States. Erected in 1988, it is a suffragan of the metropolitan Archdiocese of Louisville.

== History ==
=== 1785 to 1988 ===
The first Catholic immigrants to the Kentucky area came from Maryland in 1785. By 1796, approximately 300 Catholic families were living in the new state of Kentucky. Among the early missionaries was Stephen Badin, who set out on foot for Kentucky in 1793, sent by Bishop John Carroll of the Diocese of Baltimore. For the next 14 years Badin traveled on foot, horseback and boat between widely scattered Catholic settlements in Kentucky and the Northwest Territory. For three years, Badin was the only priest in the whole of Kentucky.

In 1808, Pope Pius VII erected the Diocese of Bardstown, covering Kentucky and most of the Northwest Territory. Saint Paul, the first Catholic church in Lexington, was constructed in 1813.

In 1841, Pope Gregory XVI suppressed the Diocese of Bardstown, which by this time encompassed only Kentucky. In its place, he created the Diocese of Louisville, with jurisdiction over the entire state. The Diocese of Covington was erected in 1853, consisting of most of the counties that today represent the Diocese of Lexington. The Lexington area remained part of these two dioceses for the next 135 years. St. Joseph Hospital, the first hospital in Lexington, was opened in 1877 by the Sisters of Charity of Nazareth.

=== 1988 to present ===
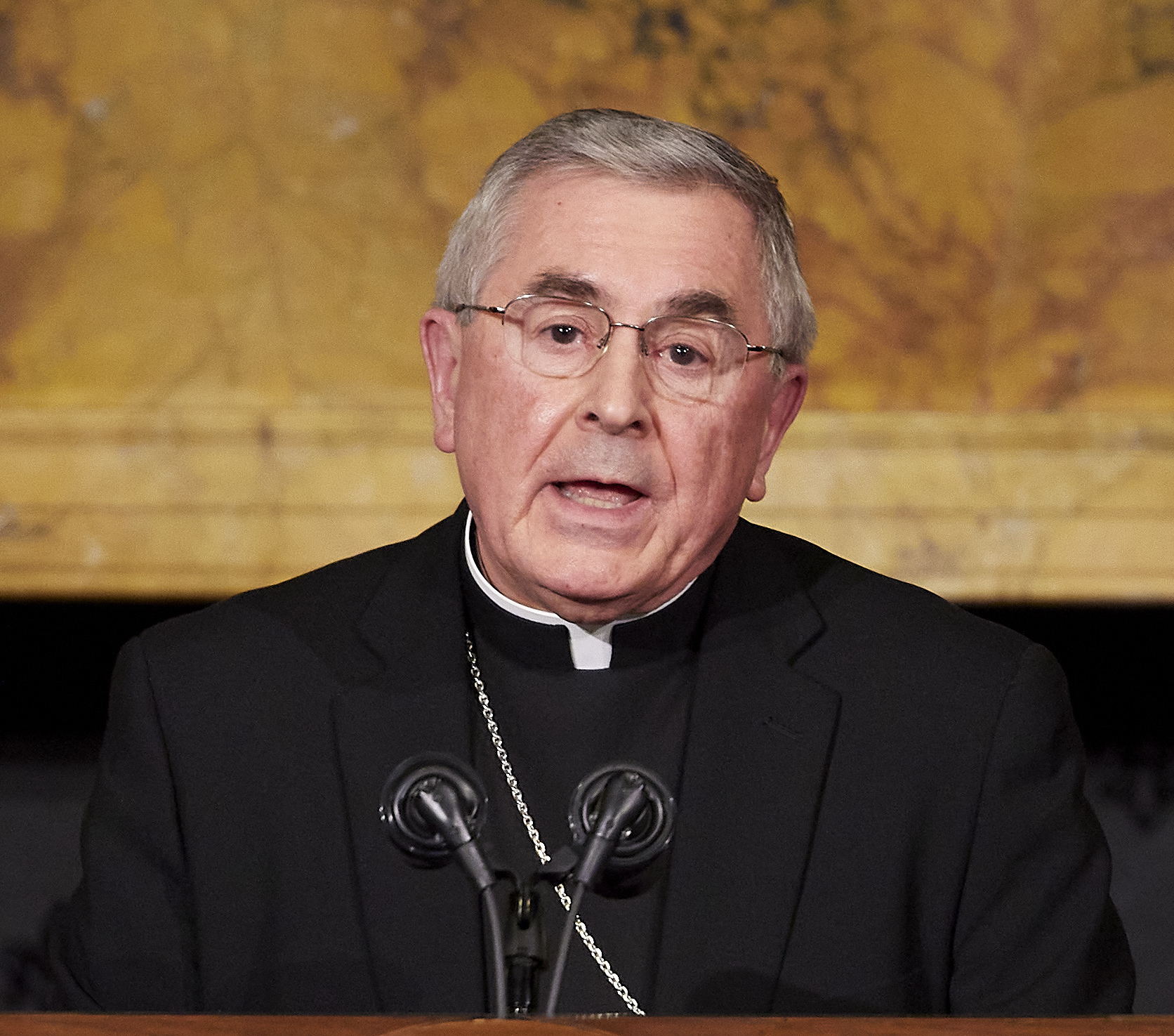
Bishop Gainer (2022)

Pope John Paul II established the Diocese of Lexington on January 14, 1988. The new diocese included 43 counties from the Diocese of Covington and seven counties from the Archdiocese of Louisville.

John Paul II named Auxiliary Bishop James Williams of Covington as the first bishop of Lexington. Christ the King Church was elevated to the status of cathedral.

In early 2002, Williams went on leave as bishop of Lexington after sexual abuse allegations arose from his service with the Archdiocese of Louisville. He resigned as bishop of Lexington in July 2002. John Paul II chose Ronald Gainer of the Diocese of Allentown to Williams. In 2014, Gainer was appointed bishop of the Diocese of Harrisburg. John Stowe, a member of the Minorites, was named by Francis as bishop of Lexington in 2015.

In May 2024, Christian Matson, a hermit and Benedictine Oblate employed by the diocese, came out publicly as transgender. He is believed to be the first hermit of the Catholic Church to do so.

=== Legal issues ===
The diocese was sued in August 2016 by three former students at Lexington Catholic High School in Lexington. One male plaintiff said he was physically assaulted at the school, a female plaintiff stated she was a victim of sexual harassment and sex discrimination, and a second male said he experienced racial discrimination.

In August 2020, the diocese released a list of 20 priests with different levels of accusations of sexual abuse. Bishop Stowe wrote that ten of the allegations were "substantiated," four allegations were deemed "credible," and the remaining six allegations were "credible" but involved minors living outside the diocese. All except two allegations were for incidents that occurred before the diocese was erected in 1988.

== Bishops ==
=== Bishops of Lexington ===
1. James Kendrick Williams (1988–2002)
2. Ronald William Gainer (2002–2014), appointed Bishop of Harrisburg
3. John Eric Stowe, OFM Conv. (2015–present)

== Coat of arms ==
Coat of arms of Roman Catholic Diocese of Lexington
| Notes Arms was designed and adopted when the diocese was erected Adopted 1988 Escutcheon The arms of the Diocese of Lexington are composed of three sections. The left side is red and contains a silver sword. The right side is silver (white) and has a blue fleur-de-lis. The bottom is blue and shows a gold diadem on a silver cross. Symbolism The red, white and blue sections honor the American flag. The silver sword represents St. Paul, the patron of the Diocese of Covington. The fleur-de-lis represents the Archdiocese of Louisville. The Diocese of Lexington was formed from these two sees. The pointed bottom of these arms represent the mountains of eastern Kentucky. The diadem on the cross honors Jesus Christ. |

== Education ==
As of 2026, the Diocese of Lexington had 11 elementary schools.

=== High schools ===
- Lexington Catholic High School – Lexington
- Piarist School – Martin
