= Kevin C. Rhoades =

American Catholic prelate (born 1957)

His Excellency, The Most Reverend Kevin Carl Rhoades
- Bishop of Fort Wayne-South Bend
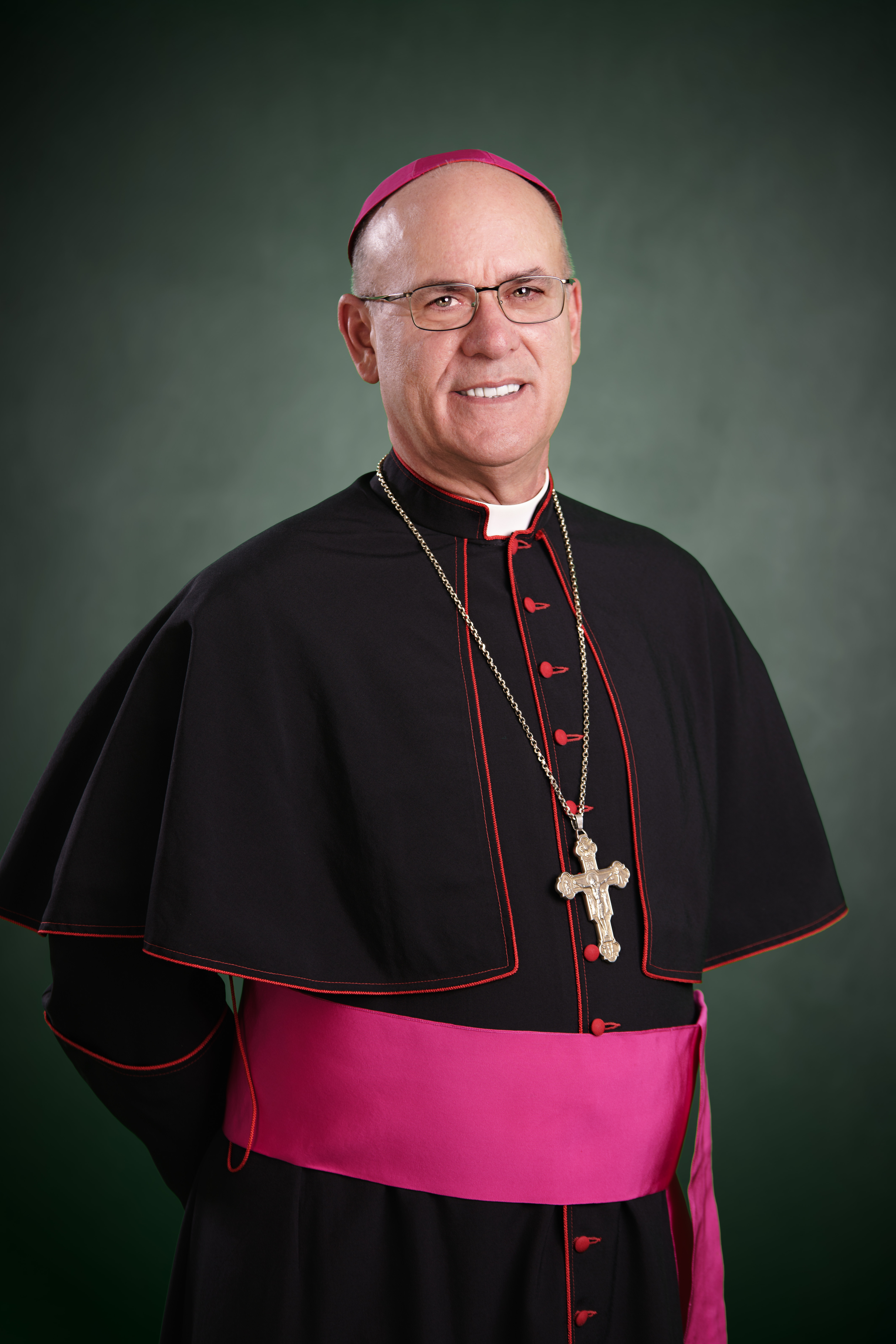
- Diocese: Fort Wayne-South Bend
- Appointed: November 14, 2009
- Installed: January 13, 2010
- Predecessor: John Michael D'Arcy
- Previous post: Bishop of Harrisburg (2004-2009)

Orders
- Ordination: July 9, 1983 by William Henry Keeler
- Consecration: December 9, 2004 by Justin Francis Rigali, William Henry Keeler, and Thomas Olmsted

Personal details
- Born: November 26, 1957 (age 68) Mahanoy City, Pennsylvania, U.S.
- Denomination: Roman Catholic Church
- Education: Mount St. Mary's University; St. Charles Borromeo Seminary; Pontifical Gregorian University; Pontifical University of Salamanca
- Motto: Veritatem in caritate (Truth in charity)

Styles of Kevin Carl Rhoades
- Reference style: His Excellency; The Most Reverend
- Spoken style: Your Excellency
- Religious style: Bishop

Kevin Carl Rhoades (born November 26, 1957) is an American Catholic prelate who has served as Bishop of Fort Wayne-South Bend in Indiana since 2009. He previously served as Bishop of Harrisburg in Pennsylvania from 2004 to 2009. In 2025, he was elected Secretary of the USCCB, the third-highest-ranking position in the conference.

== Early life ==
Kevin Carl Rhoades was born on November 26, 1957, in Mahanoy City, Pennsylvania, to Charles and Mary Rhoades. The second of three children, he has an older brother and a younger sister. His father was a cousin of Republican State Senator James J. Rhoades. Raised in Lebanon, Pennsylvania, Rhoades graduated from Lebanon Catholic High School in 1975.

Having decided to enter the priesthood, Rhoades enrolled at Mount St. Mary's University in Emmitsburg, Maryland, for two years. Rhoades applied to the Diocese of Harrisburg for placement in the program of priestly formation, and in 1977 entered St. Charles Borromeo Seminary in Wynnewood, Pennsylvania. He earned a bachelor's degree in philosophy from St. Charles in 1979.

In 1979, Rhoades entered the Pontifical North American College and the Pontifical Gregorian University in Rome. He also studied Spanish at the Pontifical University of Salamanca in Salamanca, Spain, during the summer of 1982. Archbishop Terence Cooke ordained him a deacon at St. Peter’s Basilica in Rome in 1982. Rhoades obtained his Bachelor of Sacred Theology degree from the Gregorian University in 1983.

== Priesthood ==
Rhoades was ordained to the priesthood for the Diocese of Harrisburg by Bishop William Keeler at Assumption of the Blessed Virgin Mary Church in Lebanon, Pennsylvania, on July 9, 1983.

After his 1983 ordination, the diocese assigned Rhodes as parochial vicar at St. Patrick Parish in York, Pennsylvania. During this time, he also ministered in the Spanish-speaking apostolates at Cristo Salvador Parish in York and Cristo Rey Mission in Bendersville, Pennsylvania. In 1985, Rhoades returned to the Gregorian University, earning a Licentiate of Sacred Theology in 1986 and a Licentiate of Canon Law in 1988.

After returning to Harrisburg in 1988, Keeler named Rhoades as assistant chancellor. He also served as director of the Spanish apostolate in Dauphin, Cumberland, and Perry counties. In 1990, Rhoades was appointed pastor of Saint Francis of Assisi Parish in Harrisburg, serving there for five years. In 1995, he became a professor at Mount St. Mary’s Seminary, teaching in systematic theology, canon law, and Hispanic ministry. Bishop Nicholas C. Dattilo appointed Rhoades as rector of Mount St. Mary's in July 1997.

== Bishop of Harrisburg ==
On October 14, 2004, Rhoades was appointed as the ninth bishop of Harrisburg by Pope John Paul II. He received his episcopal consecration on December 9, 2004, from Cardinal Justin Rigali, with Keeler and Bishop Thomas Olmsted serving as co-consecrators. Rhoades selected as his episcopal motto: Veritatem In Caritate, meaning, "Truth in Charity" (Ephesians 4:15 in the New Testament).

Within the USCCB, Rhoades was a member of the Committee on Ecumenical and Interreligious Affairs, the Committee on Pastoral Practices, and the Subcommittee on the Catechism. He chaired the Committee on Laity, Marriage, Family Life, and Youth.

In 2006, Rhoades recommended to the Vatican that Reverend William Presley be laicized. Presley had faced allegations of sexual abuse in the 1970s when he was assigned to the University of Notre Dame in South Bend, Indiana. In his letter, Rhoades termed Presley as a "sexual predator" and a danger to the Catholic community. The Presley case was revealed in 2018 by the Pennsylvania Grand Jury investigation of sexual abuse in the church. The grand jury also revealed that in 2007 Rhoades told the Vatican that he had ordered a second priest accused of sexual abuse to spend the rest of his life in penance. In both cases, Rhoades reported the accused priest to law enforcement, but not to the general public, fearing a scandal.

== Bishop of Fort Wayne-South Bend ==
On November 14, 2009, Pope Benedict XVI named Rhoades as the ninth bishop of Fort Wayne-South Bend. At a special Vespers service at the Cathedral on Sunday, January 3, 2010, the Diocese of Harrisburg made a formal farewell to Rhoades. In 2011, he became the first bishop to grant an imprimatur to an iPhone application. During the 2017 Fall General Assembly of the USCCB, Rhoades was elected chair of the Committee on Doctrine.

On August 1, 2018, Bishop Ronald Gainer, the bishop of Harrisburg, announced that he was removing the names of every bishop of Harrisburg from 1947 onward—including Rhoades'—from any building or room in the diocese named in their honor. Gainer took this action due to the bishops' failures to protect parishioners from sexual abuse by clerics. A room in St. Patrick Cathedral had been named after Rhodes.

On September 18, 2018, Rhoades released the names of 18 priests and deacons in the Diocese of Fort Wayne-South Bend who had credible accusations of sexually abusing minors. That same month, an unidentified male claimed that Rhoades had sexually abused him as a minor. After a brief investigation, the Dauphin County District Attorney declared the accusation to be unfounded.

A lawsuit against Rhoades and the Diocese of Harrisburg was filed in July 2019 by Donald Asbee, a Pennsylvania resident. Asbee alleged that he was sexually abused as a boy by two diocesan priests and that the diocese and its bishops tried to cover up the priests' crimes. The diocese had offered Asbee a $176,875 settlement, but he rejected it and sued instead.

Rhoades is a leading member of the USCCB's National Eucharistic Revival. Under his leadership, the committee voted to deny the eucharist to Catholic politicians who advocated abortion legalization, including President Joe Biden. For the Feast of Corpus Christi in 2022, he arranged a eucharistic procession in the Diocese of Fort Wayne-South Bend which drew nearly 5,000 participants and garnered national attention. On November 16, 2022, Rhoades was elected as chair of the USCCB's Committee on Religious Liberty.

In 2025, Rhoades spoke out against the Trump administration's denial of sacraments to Catholic immigrant detainees.

On November 12, 2025, Rhoades was elected secretary of the USCCB, the third-highest position in the conference. He defeated Archbishop James F. Checchio, and succeeded Archbishop Paul Stagg Coakley, who had been elected president.

== See also ==
- Catholic Church hierarchy
- Historical list of the Catholic bishops of the United States
- List of Catholic bishops of the United States
- Lists of patriarchs, archbishops, and bishops

== Episcopal succession ==
Catholic Church titles
Preceded by John Michael D'Arcy	Bishop of Fort Wayne-South Bend; 2010–present	Succeeded by Incumbent
Preceded by Nicholas C. Dattilo	Bishop of Harrisburg; 2004–2009	Succeeded by Joseph P. McFadden
