= Lansdale Catholic High School =

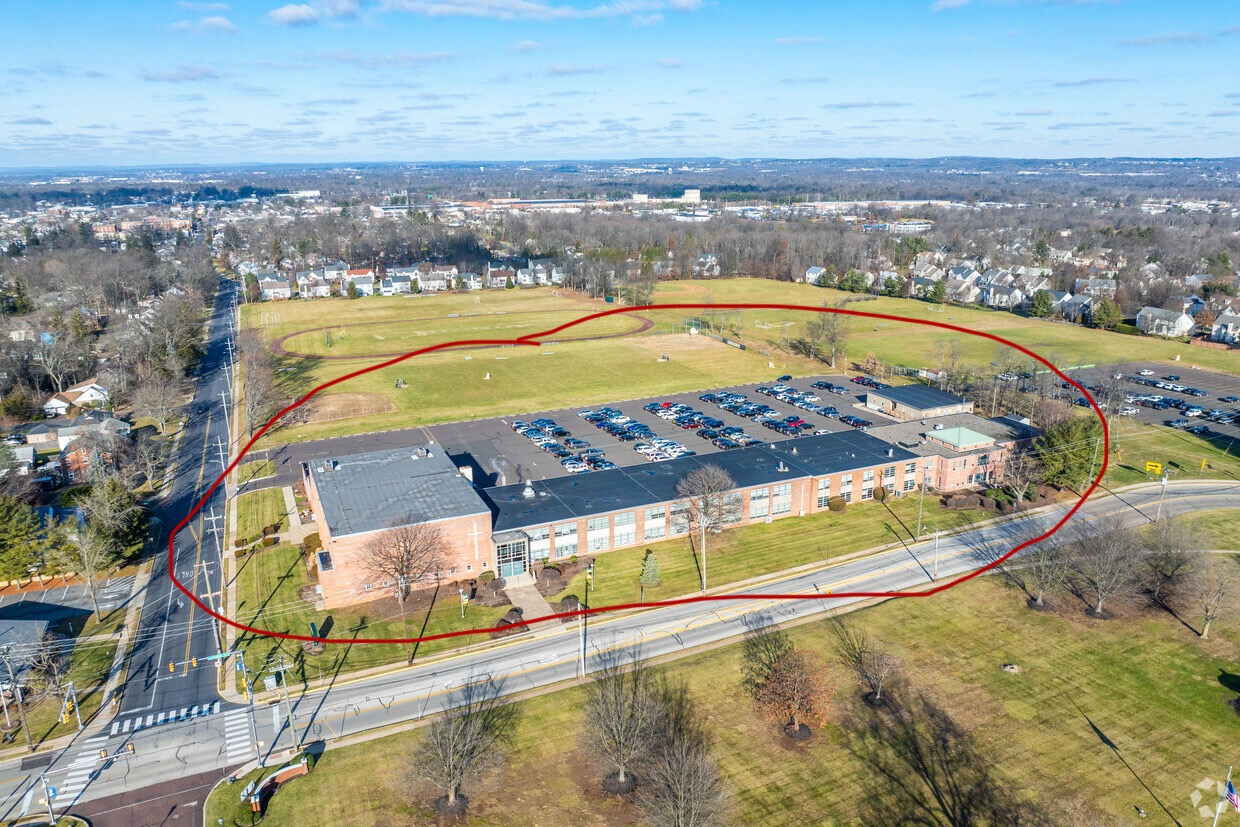

Location
- 700 Lansdale Avenue; Lansdale, (Montgomery County), Pennsylvania 19446; United States
- Coordinates: 40°14′30″N 75°16′7″W

Information
- Type: Private, coeducational
- Motto: Fides Scientia (Faith, Knowledge)
- Religious affiliation: Roman Catholic
- Established: 1949
- Founder: Monsignor Schade
- President: Meghan Callen
- Principal: James Meredith
- Chaplain: No chaplain currently
- Grades: 9-12
- Enrollment: 713 (2022)
- Average class size: 30
- Colors: Green and gold
- Slogan: A Learning Community Teaching Values for Life
- Song: "Alma Mater"
- Athletics conference: Philadelphia Catholic League
- Mascot: The Crusader (max)
- Team name: Crusaders
- Rival: Archbishop Wood High School
- Accreditation: Middle States Association of Colleges and Schools
- Publication: The Catalyst (literary magazine)
- Newspaper: The Crusader
- Yearbook: Trail
- Tuition: $9,000
- Website: www.lansdalecatholic.com

Lansdale Catholic High School is a secondary school that is part of the Roman Catholic Archdiocese of Philadelphia. It is located in Lansdale, Pennsylvania, United States.

== History ==
The School opened in September 1949 under the name of Little Flower High School. Monsignor Joseph Schade wanted to create the school with the purpose of offering competitive Catholic education to families in the surrounding area with the closest school at the time being located in The City of Philadelphia, and was aided in his efforts with help from the Sisters of St. Francis of Assisi of Philadelphia

In September 1960, the present facility opened at 7th Street and Lansdale Avenue on a property that consisted of approximately 79 acres (32 ha) of land, and the first class graduated from there in 1961. Although the sports teams had long been referred to as Lansdale Catholic, it was with the opening of the new facility that the name of the school was "officially" changed to Lansdale Catholic High School.

The school continued as a "parish" high school until the mid-1980s when control of the school was taken over by the Roman Catholic Archdiocese of Philadelphia.

In 1988, there was the dedication of a major addition to the school. It was made possible primarily through the support of the Business Leaders Organized for Catholic Schools.

In more recent years, other improvements were added including another on-site parking facility, baseball field, window replacements, air-conditioning in the gymnasium, reconditioning of the football and lacrosse fields. Over the Summer of 2012, the gymnasium was completely refurbished with new floors and bleachers.

On January 28, 2008, the Roman Catholic Archdiocese of Philadelphia announced that the school would move following the 2012 graduation pending funding. A new school, Lansdale Catholic Regional High School, in Hilltown Township, Bucks County, was to be built to replace the school in Lansdale. The name of the new school was voted by the students, parents and alumni. That project was cancelled because of financial reasons. However in 2012 it was decided that the school would not move and would stay in the original location.

== In the media ==
- Jim Lynam started his coaching career coaching the boys' basketball team for the 1964 season.
- In 1973, Bishop Michael Joseph Bransfield was a member of the faculty.
- In 1998, the Lansdale Catholic football team won an ESPN ESPY Awards for "Outrageous Play of the Year", with a "Cal-Stanford" play in a game against Upper Perkiomen.

== Notable alumni ==
- Larry Glueck, Class of 1959 - professional American football player and coach
- Tom Fazio, Class of 1962 - golf course designer
- Peggy March, Class of 1966 - youngest female artist to have a number one single in the United States; she released "I Will Follow Him" in 1963, at the age of 15. (Born Margaret A. Battavio)
- Timothy C. Senior, Class of 1977 - currently Roman Catholic auxiliary bishop of Philadelphia, wrote LCHS alma mater
- Joe Judge, Class of 2000 - former head coach of the New York Giants
