= Ronald William Gainer =

American Catholic prelate (born 1947)

His Excellency, The Most Reverend Ronald William Gainer
- Bishop Emeritus of Harrisburg
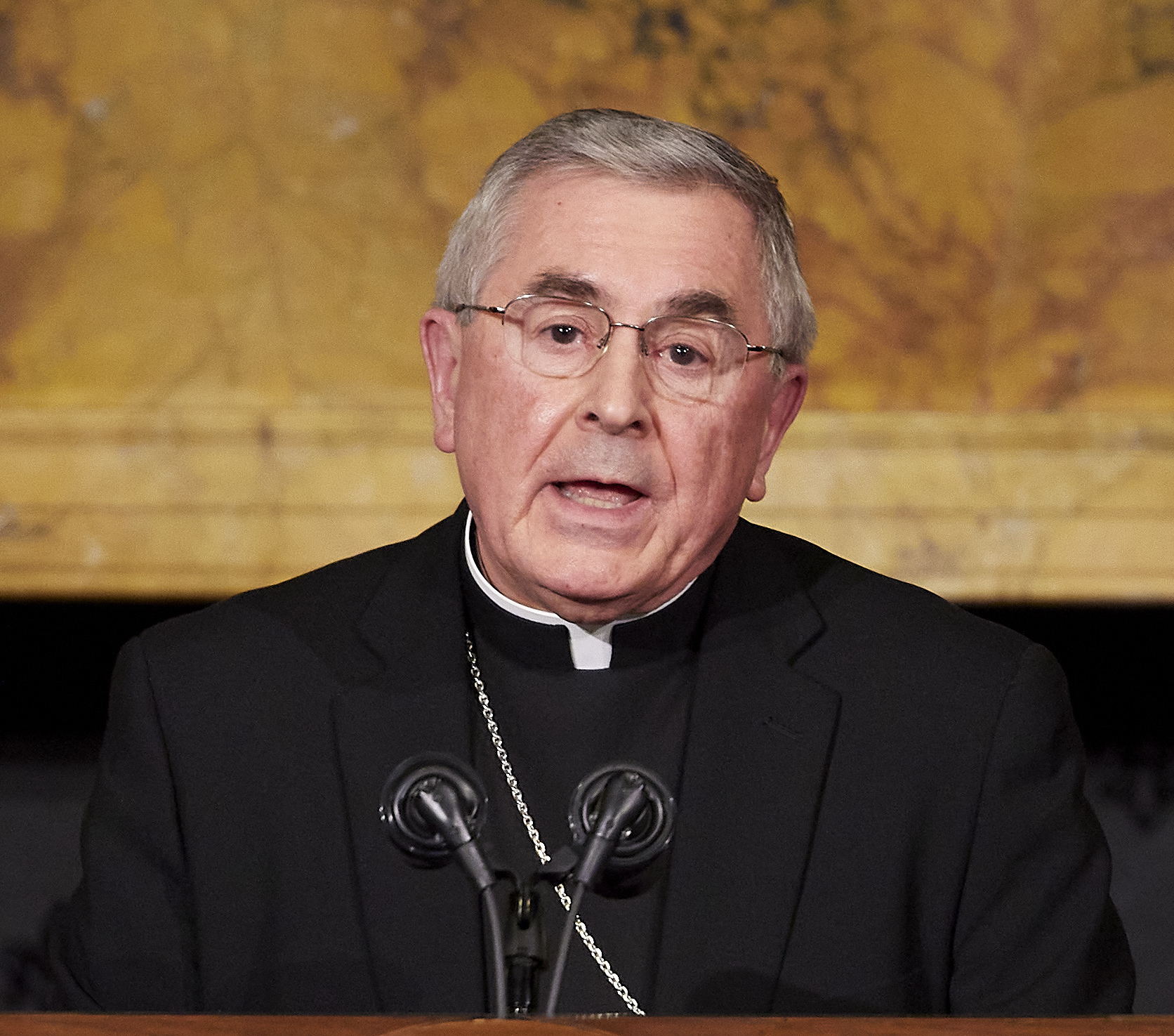
- Bishop Gainer in 2022
- Diocese: Harrisburg
- Appointed: January 20, 2014
- Installed: March 19, 2014
- Retired: April 25, 2023
- Predecessor: Joseph P. McFadden
- Successor: Timothy C. Senior
- Previous post: Bishop of Lexington (2003–2014)

Orders
- Ordination: May 19, 1973 by Joseph Mark McShea
- Consecration: February 22, 2003 by Thomas C. Kelly, Edward Peter Cullen, and Joseph Edward Kurtz

Personal details
- Born: August 24, 1947 (age 79) Pottsville, Pennsylvania, US
- Motto: Ex de plenitudine, gratiam pro gratia (Latin for 'From His fullness, grace upon grace')
- Styles
- Reference style: His Excellency; The Most Reverend
- Spoken style: Your Excellency
- Religious style: Bishop

Ronald William Gainer (born August 24, 1947) is an American Catholic prelate who served as Bishop of Harrisburg in Pennsylvania from 2014 to 2023. He previously served as Bishop of Lexington in Kentucky from 2002 to 2014.

== Biography ==
=== Early life and education ===
Gainer was born on August 24, 1947, in Pottsville, Pennsylvania, as an only child to parents of Eastern European descent. He attended St. Charles Borromeo Seminary in Philadelphia, where he obtained a Bachelor of Arts degree in 1969 and a Master of Divinity degree in 1973.

=== Priesthood ===
Gainer was ordained to the priesthood at Saint Thomas Moore Church in Salisbury Township, Pennsylvania, by Bishop Joseph Mark McShea for the Diocese of Allentown on May 19, 1973. After his ordination, Gainer served as pastor of Holy Trinity Parish in Whitehall Township, Pennsylvania. He also served as secretary of the diocesan tribunal, as secretary for Catholic life and evangelization, and as judicial vicar. Gainer attended the Pontifical Gregorian University in Rome, earning a Licentiate in canon law in 1986. The Vatican raised him to the rank of honorary prelate on August 20, 1991.

=== Bishop of Lexington ===
On December 13, 2002, Gainer was appointed the second bishop of Lexington by Pope John Paul II. He received his episcopal consecration at the Cathedral of Christ the King in Lexington, Kentucky, on February 22, 2003, from Archbishop Thomas Kelly, with Bishops Edward Cullen and Joseph Kurtz serving as co-consecrators. In 2004, Gainer urged Catholic politicians who supported abortion rights for women to refrain from receiving communion.

=== Bishop of Harrisburg ===
On January 24, 2014, Gainer was appointed the eleventh bishop of Harrisburg by Pope Francis. He was installed on March 19, 2014, in the Cathedral of St. Patrick in Harrisburg.

On July 1, 2014, Gainer introduced a sports policy prohibiting girls at Catholic schools in the diocese from participating in any wrestling, tackle football, or tackle rugby matches, either on all-girl or coed teams. The policy also required male wrestlers to forfeit any matches against female opponents. However, the policy did not bar tackle football or rugby teams from playing against coed teams. According to Gainer's policy, the ban applies to any women's sports "...that involve substantial and potentially immodest physical contact".

Gainer served as chair of the Cross Catholic Outreach, an international charity. He was also president of the Pennsylvania Catholic Conference, the public affairs policy arm of the ten Catholic dioceses in Pennsylvania.

=== Retirement ===
On April 25, 2023, Pope Francis accepted Gainer's resignation as bishop of Harrisburg as he reached the canonical mandatory retirement age of 75. Pope Francis appointed Bishop Timothy C. Senior to succeed Gainer as the 12th bishop of Harrisburg.

=== Sexual abuse crimes ===
In 2016, Pennsylvania Attorney General Josh Shapiro launched a grand jury investigation into allegations of sexual abuse and the handling of these allegations by six dioceses, including the Diocese of Harrisburg. According to The Philadelphia Inquirer, in 2017 the Diocese of Harrisburg and the Diocese of Greensburg attempted to shut down the grand jury investigation.

On August 1, 2018, Gainer disclosed the names of 71 past and present clergy affiliated with the Diocese of Harrisburg who were credibly accused of sexually abusing children. The majority of persons on the list were deceased, and some were accused only after their deaths. Gainer explained the rationale for releasing this information:

"While these men are not a risk to the public, I still felt compelled to release their names in an effort to confirm for those brave survivors... that we have heard their cries and taken them seriously." Gainer also stated that prior to 2002, some lawsuits had been settled using confidentiality clauses, and he was now releasing all victims from such confidentiality agreements.

Immediately following the release of the list, Gainer announced the removal of the names of all the bishops of Harrisburg since 1947 from buildings or rooms in diocesan facilities. This was in response to their failures to protect children from sexual abuse.

== Episcopal succession ==
Catholic Church titles
| Preceded by Joseph P. McFadden | Bishop of Harrisburg; 2014–2023 | Succeeded by Timothy C. Senior |
| Preceded by James Kendrick Williams | Bishop of Lexington; 2003–2014 | Succeeded by John Stowe |
