= Daniel Edward Thomas =

American Catholic prelate (born 1959)

The Most Reverend Daniel Edward Thomas
- Bishop of Toledo in America
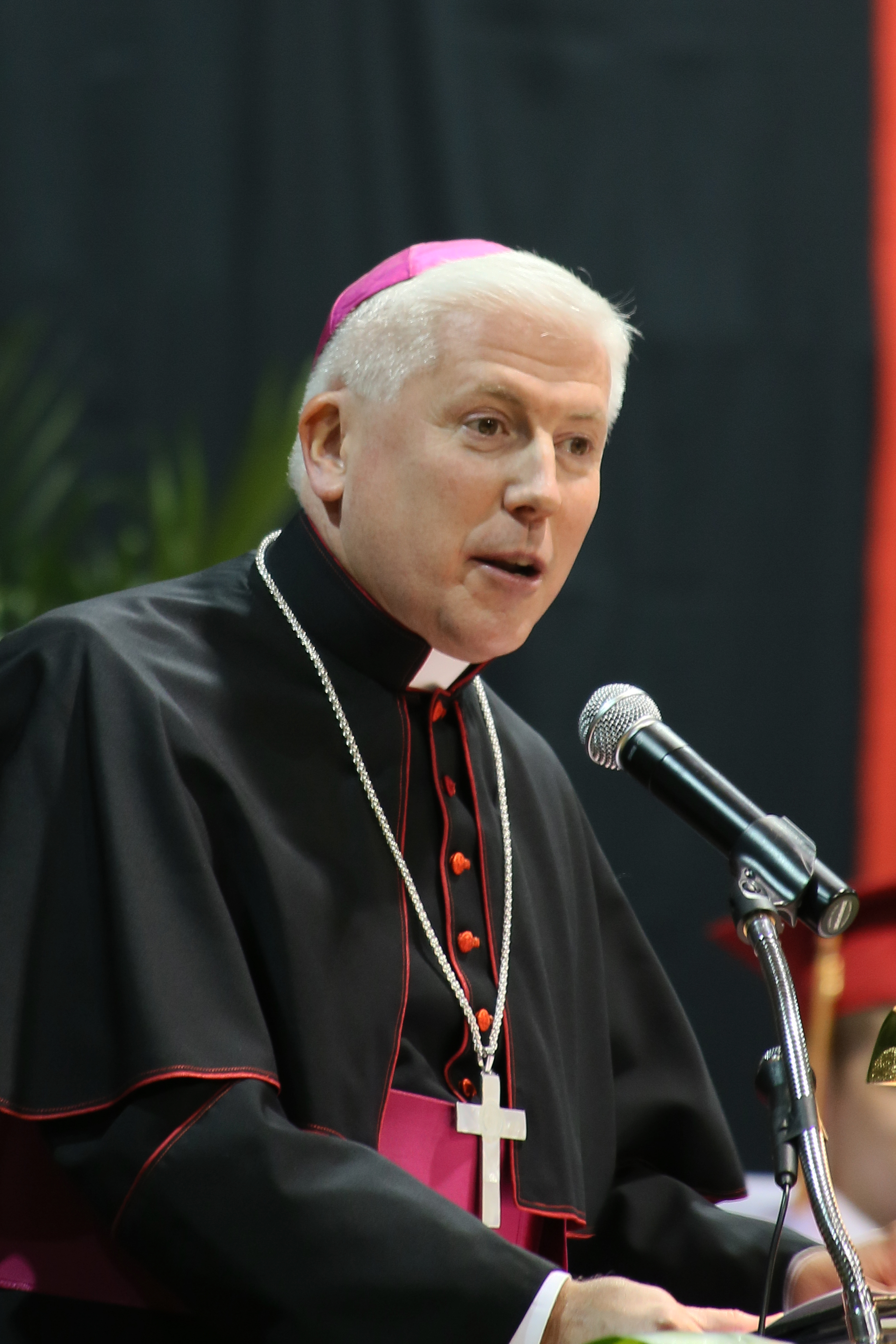
- Bishop Thomas in 2013
- Church: Catholic; Latin Church
- Diocese: Toledo in America
- Appointed: August 26, 2014
- Installed: October 22, 2014
- Predecessor: Leonard Paul Blair
- Previous post: Auxiliary Bishop of Philadelphia & Titular Bishop of Bardstown (2006‍–‍2014)

Orders
- Ordination: May 18, 1985 by John Krol
- Consecration: July 26, 2006 by Justin Francis Rigali, John Patrick Foley, and Edwin Frederick O'Brien

Personal details
- Born: June 11, 1959 (age 67) Manayunk, Philadelphia, Pennsylvania, US
- Education: St. Charles Borromeo Seminary; Pontifical Gregorian University
- Motto: Dominus meus et Deus meus (Latin for 'My Lord and my God')
- Styles
- Reference style: His Excellency; The Most Reverend
- Spoken style: Your Excellency
- Religious style: Bishop

Daniel Edward Thomas (born June 11, 1959) is an American Catholic prelate serving as the Bishop of Toledo, Ohio since 2014. He is the chairman of the Pro-Life Activities Committee of the U.S. Conference of Catholic Bishops. He was an auxiliary bishop of the Archdiocese of Philadelphia in Pennsylvania from 2006 to 2014.

== Biography ==
=== Early life ===
Thomas was born on June 11, 1959, in the Manayunk section of Philadelphia, to Francis and Anna (née Weber) Thomas. He went to Holy Family Parish Elementary School and then Roman Catholic High School in Philadelphia.

After graduating from high school in 1977, Thomas decided to become a priest. He then entered St. Charles Borromeo Seminary in Wynnewood, Pennsylvania. Thomas received a Bachelor of Arts degree from St. Charles in 1981 and a Master of Arts degree in 1985.

=== Priesthood ===
Thomas was ordained to the priesthood for the Archdiocese of Philadelphia by Cardinal John Krol at the Cathedral Basilica of Saints Peter and Paul in Philadelphia on May 18, 1985. After his ordination, the archdiocese assigned him as parochial vicar of Saint Joseph's Parish in Aston, Pennsylvania.

Two years later, in 1987, Thomas was sent to Rome to study dogmatic theology while residing at the Pontifical North American College in Rome. He received a Licentiate of Sacred Theology from the Pontifical Gregorian University in Rome in 1989. Thomas stayed in Rome for the next 15 years, serving as an official of the Congregation for Bishops in the Roman Curia. During this same period, he also acted as spiritual director to the seminarians of the North American College.

Thomas returned to Philadelphia in 2005; at that time, the archdiocese assigned him as pastor of Our Lady of the Assumption Parish in Strafford, Pennsylvania. He was raised to the rank of honorary prelate by the Vatican that same year.

=== Auxiliary Bishop of Philadelphia ===
On June 8, 2006, Thomas was appointed as an auxiliary bishop of Philadelphia and titular bishop of Bardstown by Pope Benedict XVI. He received his episcopal consecration on July 26, 2006, from Cardinal Justin Rigali, with Archbishops John Foley and Edwin O'Brien serving as co-consecrators, in the Cathedral-Basilica of Sts. Peter and Paul. Thomas adopted as his episcopal motto: Dominus Meus Et Deus Meus ('My Lord and my God') from John 20:28.

While auxiliary bishop, Thomas headed the Secretariat of Clergy in the archdiocesan curia, and oversaw St. Charles Borromeo Seminary and the archdiocese's Vocation Office, the Office for Communications and its newspaper, The Catholic Standard and Times.

=== Bishop of Toledo ===
Pope Francis named Thomas as bishop of Toledo on August 26, 2014. He was installed on October 22, 2014.

On December 28, 2016, Francis named Thomas as apostolic administrator of the Diocese of Cleveland. He served this additional assignment until Bishop Nelson Perez was installed on September 5, 2017.

In 2018, Thomas reflected on his handling of a sexual abuse allegation as auxiliary bishop in Philadelphia. The incident had been reported in a 2011 grand jury investigation of sexual abuse in the Archdiocese of Philadelphia. In 2007, a man known as "Ben" reported to the archdiocese that he had been sexually abused when he was a child by Reverend Joseph J. Gallagher. Gallagher was already the focus of similar allegations. However, the archdiocese review board found Ben's allegations to be unsubstantiated. Thomas approved the findings and sent them to the archbishop. Less than a year later, Ben committed suicide. Thomas had this comment:

In hindsight, perhaps I would have asked if there was more information we could determine and make a final determination on... Well I think that I feel guilty not just for myself but for any Bishop and priest who has in any way learned and known of any abuse taking place.

Thomas announced that the Vatican had excommunicated Reverend Bev Bingle, a Toledo minister. Bingle had been ordained as a priest by the organization Roman Catholic Womenpriests in 2013. She had been ministering at Holy Spirit Catholic Community in Toledo since her ordination. In August, 2020, Thomas announced that Reverend Michael Zacharias, a priest at St. Peter's Parish in Mansfield, Ohio, had been arrested by the Federal Bureau of Investigation (FBI) on sexual abuse charges. After hearing about Zacharias' arrest, Thomas immediately suspended him from all priestly functions.

== Viewpoints ==
=== Legal abortion ===
On June 24, 2022, Thomas released a statement supporting the verdict in Dobbs v. Jackson Women's Health Organization, which overturned Roe v. Wade, greatly limiting abortion access for women in the United States.

This historic moment moves us a step closer to establishing a culture of life where every life is valued, where the dignity of every person born and pre-born is respected, and where each human person is treasured as created in the image and likeness of God.

In December 2022, Thomas condemned a proposal by the Toledo City Council to use COVID-19 pandemic relief funds to pay for out-of-state travel by local woman seeking an abortion.

=== Immigration ===
In April 2026, Thomas and Bishop Brendan J. Cahill of Victoria, Texas sent a joint letter to United States Department of Homeland Security Secretary Markwayne Mullin and Todd Lyons, acting director of Immigration and Customs Enforcement (ICE), expressing concern about the treatment of pregnant and nursing mothers in ICE custody.

== See also ==
- Catholic Church hierarchy
- Catholic Church in the United States
- Historical list of the Catholic bishops of the United States
- List of Catholic bishops of the United States
- Lists of patriarchs, archbishops, and bishops

== Episcopal succession ==
Catholic Church titles
Preceded by Leonard Paul Blair	Bishop of Toledo; 2014–present	Succeeded by Incumbent
Preceded by –	Auxiliary Bishop of Philadelphia; 2006–2014	Succeeded by –
