= Michael William Hyle =

American prelate

His Excellency, The Most Reverend Michael William Hyle
- Bishop of Wilmington
- See: Diocese of Wilmington
- Installed: May 9, 1960
- Term ended: December 26, 1967
- Predecessor: Edmond Fitzmaurice
- Successor: Thomas Mardaga
- Other posts: Coadjutor Bishop of Wilmington (1958–1960); Titular Bishop of Christopolis (1958–1960)

Orders
- Ordination: March 12, 1927 by Giuseppe Palica
- Consecration: September 24, 1958 by Amleto Giovanni Cicognani

Personal details
- Born: October 13, 1901 Baltimore, Maryland, USA
- Died: December 26, 1967 (aged 66) Wilmington, Delaware, USA
- Denomination: Roman Catholic Church
- Education: St. Charles College; St. Mary's Seminary; Pontifical North American College; Urban College of Propaganda
- Motto: Quis ut Deus (Who is God)

Styles of Michael William Hyle
- Reference style: His Excellency; The Most Reverend
- Spoken style: Your Excellency
- Religious style: bishop

Michael William Hyle (October 13, 1901 – December 26, 1967) was an American prelate of the Roman Catholic Church. He served as bishop of the Diocese of Wilmington in Delaware from 1960 until his death in 1967.

== Biography ==
=== Early life ===
Michael Hyle was born on October 13, 1901, in Baltimore, Maryland, to John and Elizabeth (née McCloskey) Hyle. He attended St. Charles College in Catonsville, Maryland and afterwards St. Mary's Seminary in Baltimore, obtaining a Bachelor of Sacred Theology degree there in 1922. Hyle then went to Rome to attend the Pontifical North American College and the Urban College of Propaganda, earning a Licentiate of Sacred Theology in 1926.

=== Priesthood ===
Hyle was ordained to the priesthood for the Archdiocese of Baltimore in Rome by Archbishop Giuseppe Palica on March 12, 1927. After doing pastoral work in Washington, D.C. from 1927 to 1943, Hyle served as pastor at a parish in Libertytown, Maryland, until 1946. Hyle was then transferred to a parish in Bradshaw, Maryland (1946–1957), and finally to one in Baltimore (1957–1958).

=== Coadjutor Bishop and Bishop of Wilmington ===
On July 3, 1958, Hyle was appointed coadjutor bishop, with right of succession, of Wilmington and titular bishop of Christopolis by Pope Pius XII. He received his episcopal consecration on September 24, 1958, at the Basilica of the Assumption of the Blessed Virgin Mary in Baltimore from Archbishop Amleto Cicognani, with Archbishop Albert Meyer and Bishop Jerome Sebastian serving as co-consecrators. As coadjutor bishop, Hyle also served as vicar general of the diocese and pastor of Christ Our King Parish.

Upon the retirement of Bishop Edmond Fitzmaurice on March 2, 1960, Hyle succeeded him immediately as the fifth bishop of Wilmington. He attended all four sessions of the Second Vatican Council in Rome between 1962 and 1965. He dedicated much of his administration to the implementation of the Council's reforms, encouraging the formation of parish councils and the ecumenical movement. Hyle also established St. Mark's High School in Wilmington and the University of Delaware's Newman Centre (Thomas More Oratory) in Newark, Delaware.

=== Death ===
Michael Hyle died on December 26, 1967, at age 66 in Wilmington; he was the first bishop of Wilmington to die while still in office.

Catholic Church titles
Preceded by Edmond John Fitzmaurice	Bishop of Wilmington; 1960–1967	Succeeded by Thomas Joseph Mardaga
