= Sexual abuse scandal in the Roman Catholic Diocese of Wilmington =

The sexual abuse scandal in Wilmington diocese is a significant episode in the series of Catholic sex abuse cases in the United States and Ireland.

== Bishop Saltarelli releases 20 names ==
Bishop Michael Angelo Saltarelli released the names of 20 diocesan priests accused of sexual abuse, and once said, "I condemn what's been done to victims with all my heart."

== 130 lawsuits filed ==
Altogether, more than 130 lawsuits have been filed against the diocese or Catholic religious orders in Delaware.

== Allegations against Oblates of St. Francis de Sales ==
A Superior Court jury ruled the operators of Salesianum School -- the Oblates of St. Francis de Sales -- were liable under the Delaware Child Victim's Act of 2007, but their actions were not the proximate cause of the harm to James Sheehan.

== Diocese files for chapter 11 bankruptcy ==
In October 2009, bishop William Francis Malooly sought Chapter 11 protection for his diocese after obtaining financial settlements with victims of local child abusing priests.

== Retirement benefits for abusive priests ==
The diocese said it is obligated to keep paying retirement benefits to six priests who church officials have confirmed are pedophiles. Similar controversial payments were reportedly given in Ireland to abusive priests in that country.

== Anti-abuse charter ==
In a November 2009 statement, the diocese asserted that an independent audit showed it was in compliance with the Charter for the Protection of Children and Young People, adopted in 2002 by the United States Conference of Catholic Bishops

== See also ==
- Abuse
- Child abuse
- Child sexual abuse
- Religious abuse
- Sexual abuse
- Sexual misconduct
- Spiritual abuse
