= Edmond Fitzmaurice =

Edmond Fitzmaurice may refer to:

- Edmond Fitzmaurice, 1st Baron Fitzmaurice, British politician
- Edmond John Fitzmaurice, Roman Catholic bishop of Wilmington
