= Saint Francis of Assisi School =

Saint Francis of Assisi School may refer to the following schools:

== Australia ==
- St Francis of Assisi School - Newton, South Australia
- St Francis of Assisi Primary School - Calwell, Australian Capital Territory

== United States ==
- St. Francis of Assisi School - Yorba Linda, California - Roman Catholic Diocese of Orange
- St. Francis of Assisi School - Des Moines, Iowa - Roman Catholic Diocese of Des Moines
- St. Francis of Assisi School - Baltimore, Maryland - Baltimore Archdiocese
- St. Francis of Assisi School - Houston, Texas - Galveston-Houston Archdiocese

== See also ==
- St Francis of Assisi Catholic College (formerly St Francis of Assisi RC School) - Walsall, England, United Kingdom
- The Academy of St Francis of Assisi - Liverpool, England, United Kingdom
- Saint Francis of Assisi College - Philippines
- St. Francis of Assisi of Silay Foundation Inc. - Philippines
