= William Edward Koenig =

American Catholic Bishop

His Excellency, The Most Reverend William Edward Koenig
- Bishop of Wilmington
- Church: Roman Catholic Church
- See: Diocese of Wilmington
- Appointed: April 30, 2021
- Installed: July 13, 2021
- Predecessor: W. Francis Malooly

Orders
- Ordination: May 14, 1983 by John R. McGann
- Consecration: July 13, 2021 by William E. Lori, John Barres, and W. Francis Malooly

Personal details
- Born: August 17, 1956 (age 69) Queens, New York, US
- Education: Cathedral College of the Immaculate Conception; Seminary of the Immaculate Conception; Fordham University
- Motto: We Walk By Faith

Styles of William Edward Koenig
- Reference style: His Excellency; The Most Reverend
- Spoken style: Your Excellency
- Religious style: Bishop

William Edward Koenig (born August 17, 1956) is an American Catholic prelate who has served as bishop of Wilmington in Delaware since 2021.

== Biography ==
=== Early life ===
William Koenig was born on August 17, 1955, in Queens, New York. Koenig grew up in East Meadow, New York, attending St. Raphael's Elementary School. Deciding to become a priest, he entered St. Pius X Preparatory Seminary in Uniondale, New York, the minor seminary in the New York City area.

Koenig progressed to Cathedral College of the Immaculate Conception in Douglaston, New York, in 1975. Four years later, Koenig started studying at the Seminary of the Immaculate Conception in Huntington, New York. He received a Master of Divinity degree from that seminary in 1983.

=== Priesthood ===
On May 14, 1983, Fr. Koenig was ordained to the priesthood for the Diocese of Rockville Centre by Bishop John R. McGann at St. Agnes Cathedral in Rockville Centre, New York.

After his ordination, the diocese assigned Koenig in 1983 as parochial vicar at St. Edward the Confessor Parish in Syosset, New York. Three years later, he was transferred to Setauket, New York, to serve as parochial vicar at St. James Parish. During his time in Setauket, Koenig also worked in the Campus Ministry Program at the State University at Stony Brook in Stony Brook, New York. Bishop John R. McGann named Koenig as director of vocations in 1989 and director of ministry to priests in 1990.

In 1989, Koenig became diocesan director of vocations at the cathedral residence of the Immaculate Conception in Douglaston, New York, helping in the formation of seminarians. In 1990, he also became diocesan director of ministry to priests. He held both positions for the next six years.

In 1994, Koenig obtained a Master of Social Work degree from Fordham University in New York City. In 2000, the diocese appointed him to his first position as pastor at St. William the Abbot Parish in Seaford, New York. In 2007, Pope Benedict XVI named Koenig as chaplain to his holiness.Bishop William F. Murphy appointed Koenig as rector of St. Agnes Cathedral in 2009. He left that position in 2020 when Bishop John Barres appointed him vicar for clergy for the diocese.

==== Bishop of Wilmington ====
On April 30, 2021, Pope Francis appointed Koenig as bishop of the Diocese of Wilmington. Koenig was consecrated by Archbishop William E. Lori on July 13, 2021, at the Church of St. Elizabeth in Wilmington, Delaware, with Bishops John Barres and W. Francis Malooly serving as co-consecrators.

Koenig was asked in 2021 if he would give the eucharist to President Joe Biden, who maintained a residence in Delaware. Some American prelates had stated they would refuse communion to Biden due to his support for abortion rights for women and same-sex marriage. Koenig said that he would discuss Catholic teaching with him.

In March 2023, Koenig expressed his opposition to a proposed bill in the Delaware House of Representatives that would require priests to violate the seal of the confessional to report admission of sexual abuse crimes to police.

== See also ==
- Catholic Church hierarchy
- Catholic Church in the United States
- Historical list of the Catholic bishops of the United States
- List of Catholic bishops of the United States
- Lists of patriarchs, archbishops, and bishops

== Episcopal succession ==
Catholic Church titles
Preceded by W. Francis Malooly	Bishop of Wilmington; 2021-Present	Succeeded by Incumbent
