= Hubert James Cartwright =

Catholic bishop

- Coadjutor Bishop of Wilmington
- In office: 1956-1958

Orders
- Ordination: June 11, 1927
- Consecration: October 24, 1956

Personal details
- Born: August 22, 1900 Philadelphia, Pennsylvania, U.S.
- Died: March 6, 1958 (aged 57)
- Denomination: Roman Catholic

Hubert James Cartwright (August 22, 1900 – March 6, 1958) was an American prelate of the Roman Catholic Church who served as Coadjutor Bishop of the Diocese of Wilmington, Delaware from 1956 to 1958.

== Biography ==
Born in Philadelphia, Pennsylvania, United States, Cartwright grew up there and attended St. Charles Borromeo Seminary. He was ordained a priest for the Roman Catholic Archdiocese of Philadelphia on June 11, 1927.

In 1936, Father Cartwright became rector of the Cathedral Basilica of Ss. Peter and Paul, Philadelphia, where he supervised a major renovation.

In 1956, he was assigned coadjutor bishop of Wilmington with the right of succeeding the incumbent bishop, Edmond John Fitzmaurice, in the event of the latter's resignation or death.

On August 3, 1956, Cartwright was appointed titular bishop of Neve (Nebo).

== Death ==
Bishop Cartwright died on March 6, 1958, aged 57, while still coadjutor.

Catholic Church titles
Preceded by –	Coadjutor Bishop of Wilmington; 1956–1958	Succeeded by –
