= List of schools in the Roman Catholic Archdiocese of Baltimore =

This article contains a list of the schools, colleges, and universities in the Roman Catholic Archdiocese of Baltimore.

== Colleges and universities ==
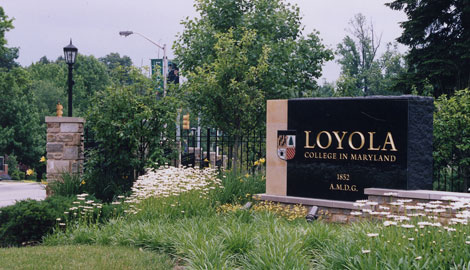
Loyola University

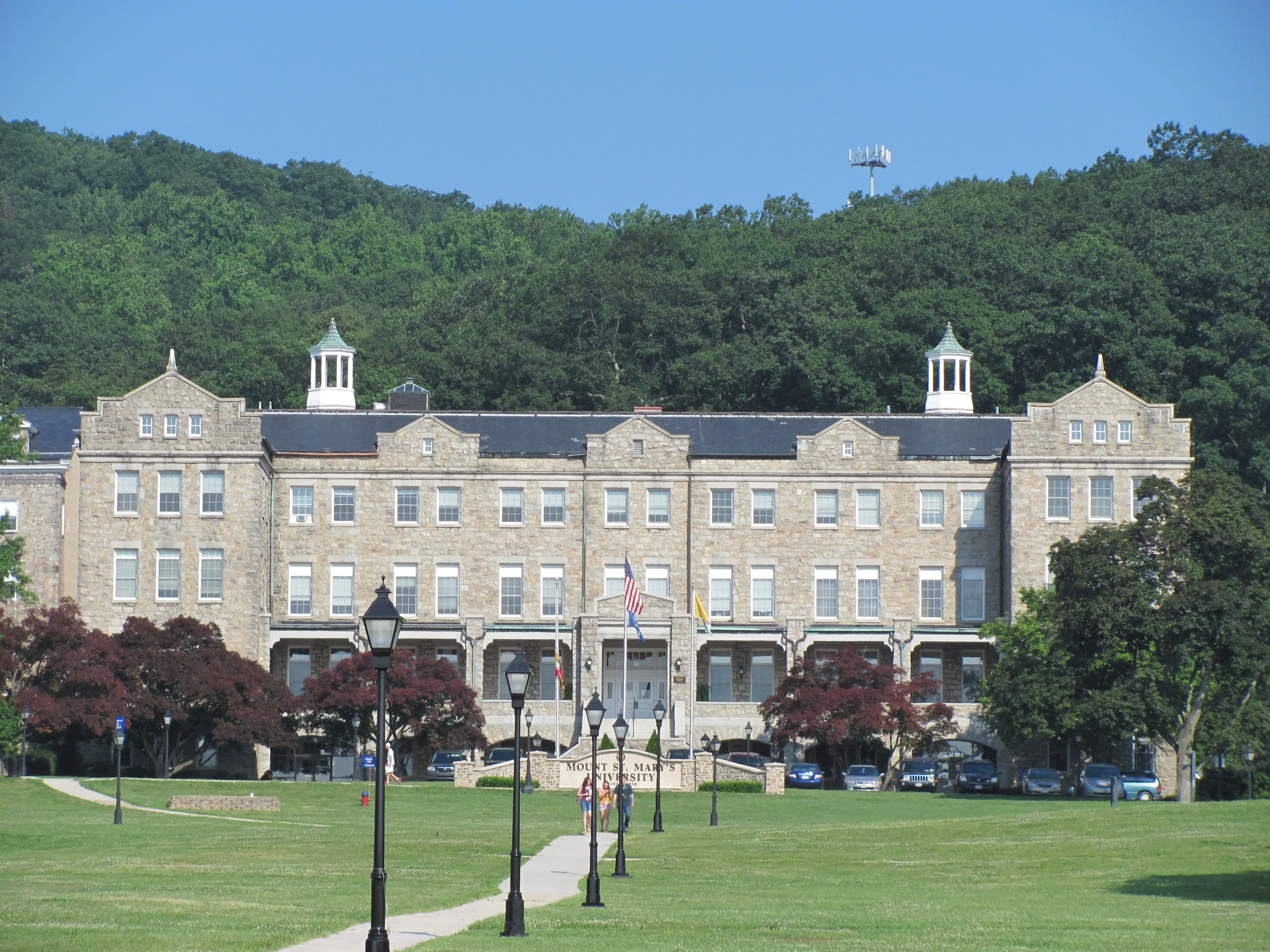
Mount St. Mary's University

School	Location	Religious order	Founded
Loyola University Maryland	Baltimore	Society of Jesus	1852
Mount St. Mary's Seminary	Emmitsburg	Diocesan	1808
Mount St. Mary's University	Emmitsburg	Society of St. Sulpice	1808
Notre Dame of Maryland University	Baltimore	School Sisters of Notre Dame	1895
St. Mary's Seminary and University	Baltimore	Society of St. Sulpice	1791

== Secondary schools ==
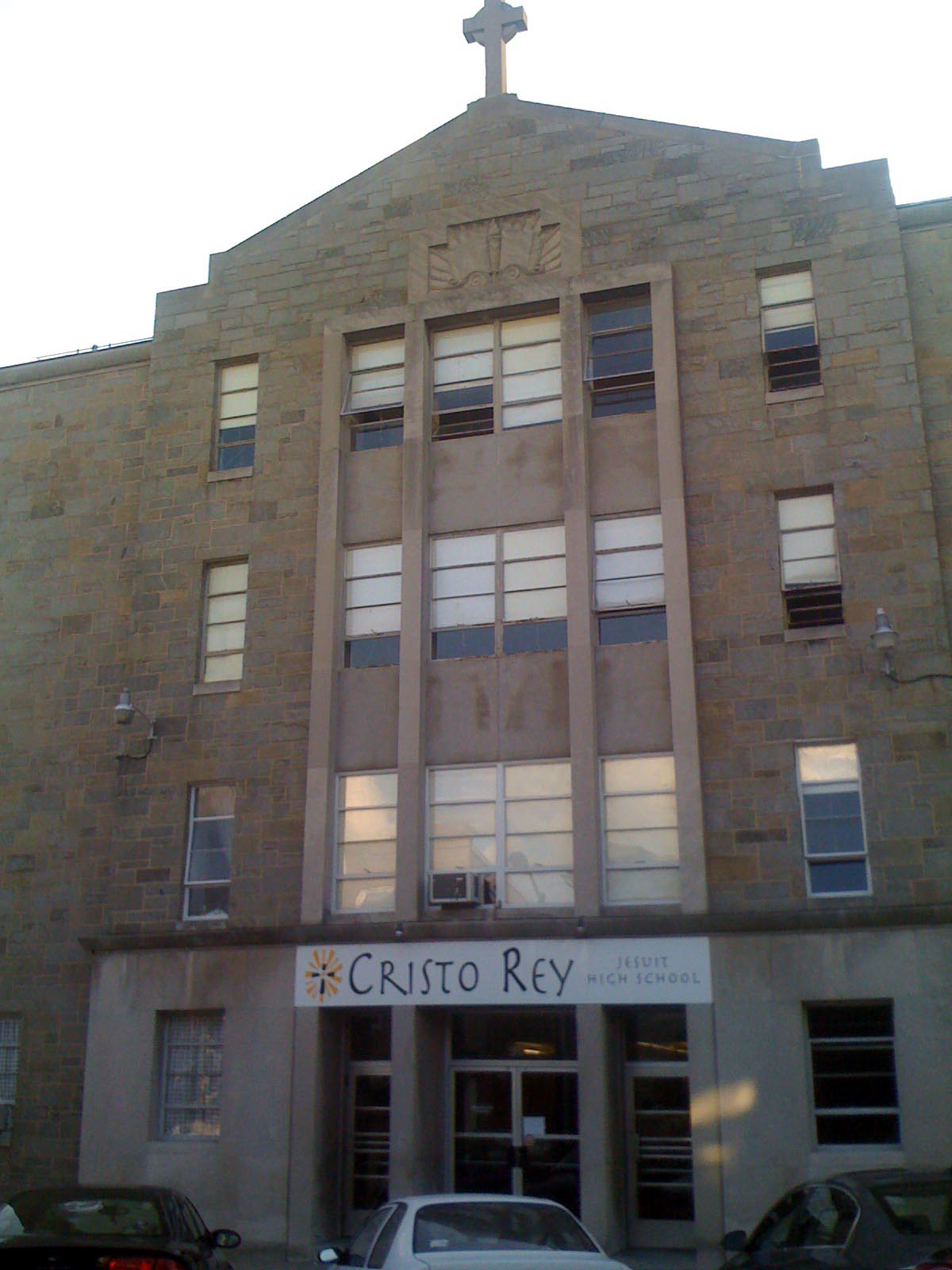
Cristo Rey Jesuit High School, Baltimore

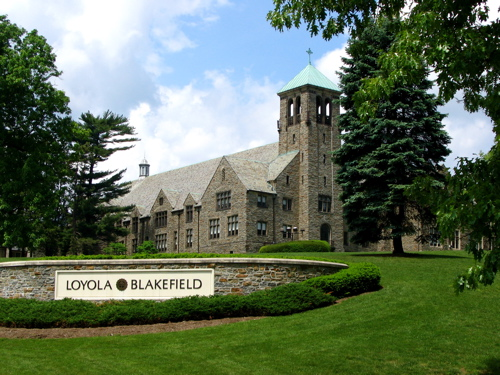
Loyola Blakefield, Towson

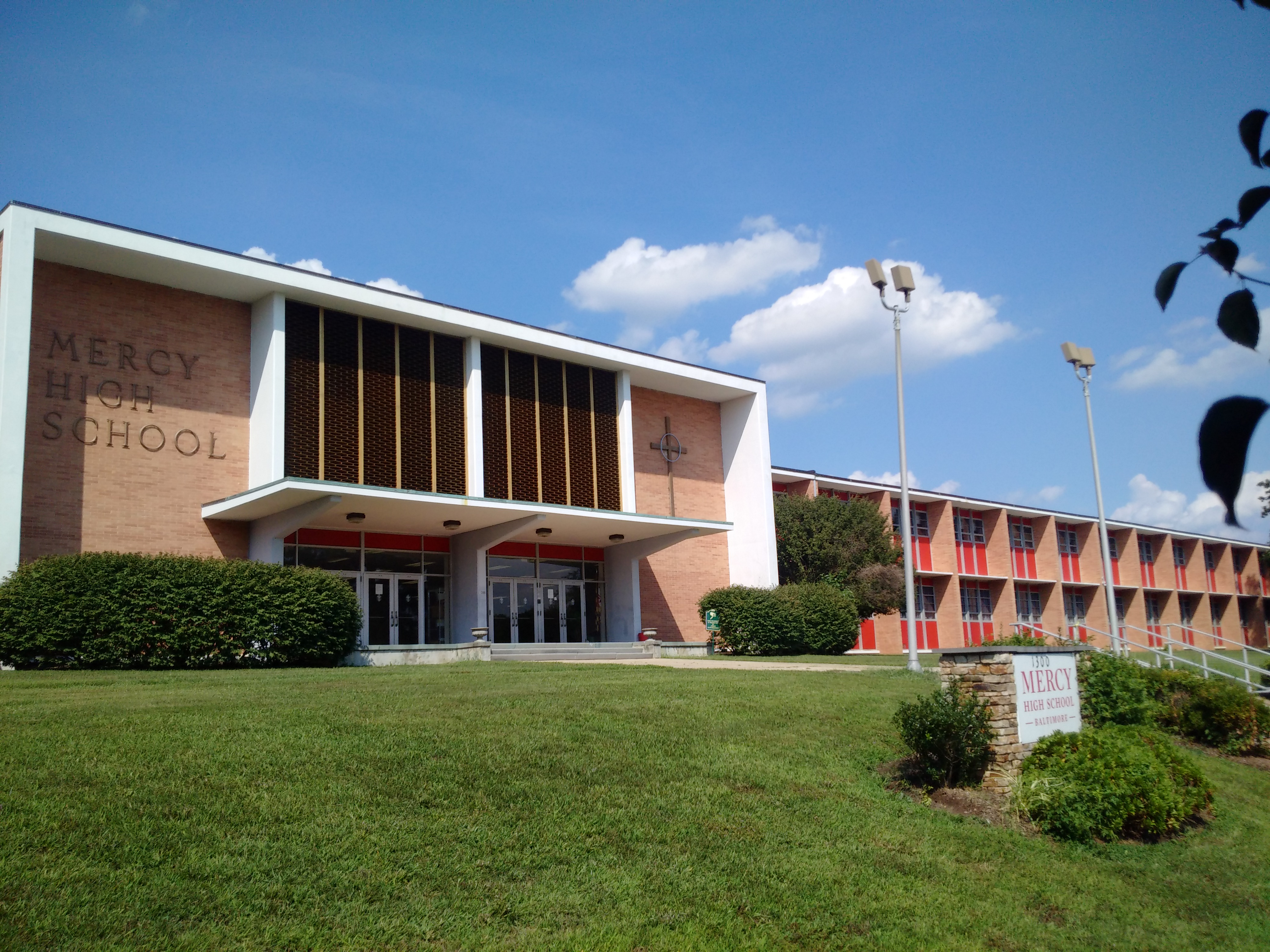
Mercy High School, Baltimore

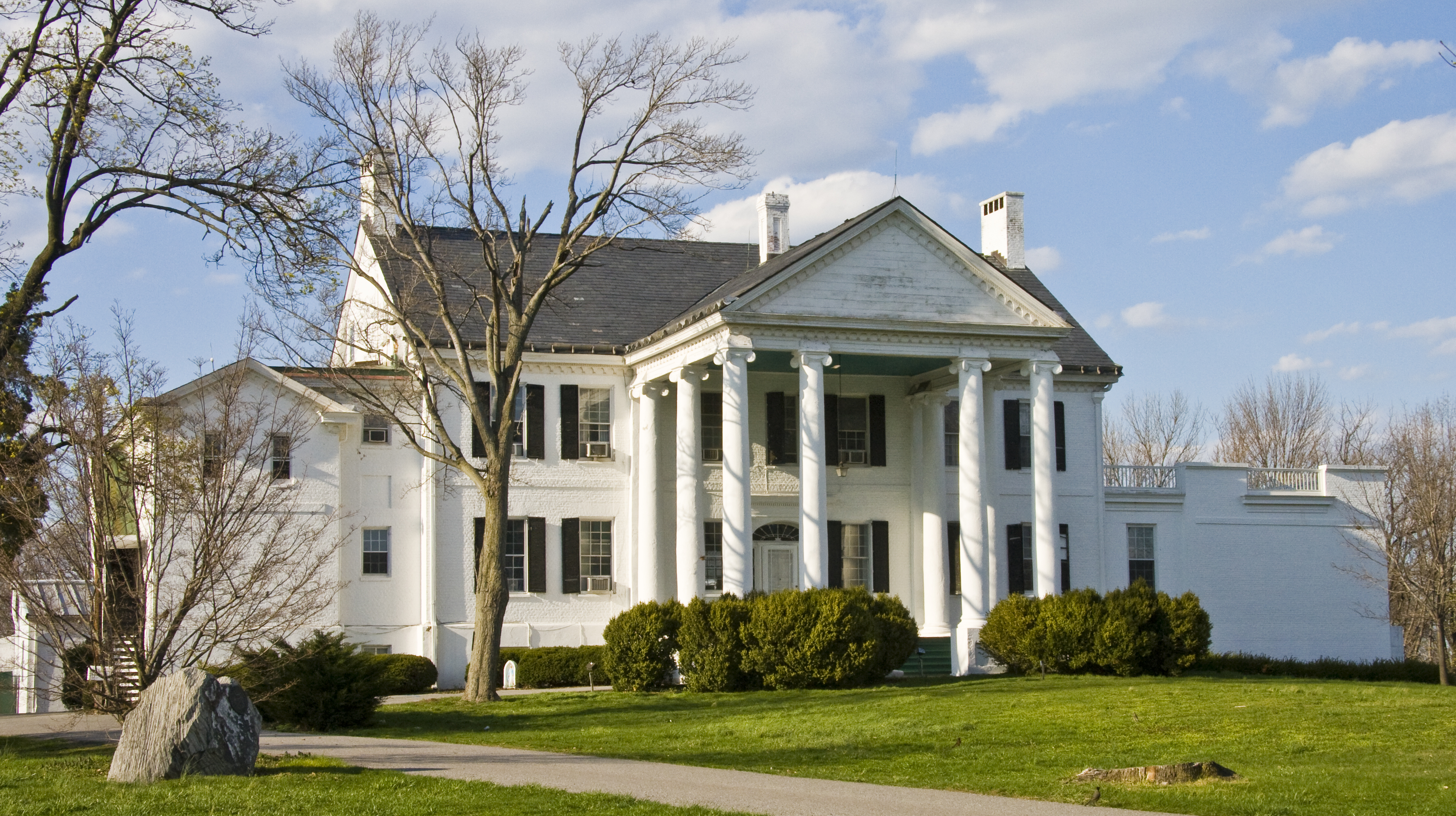
St. John's Catholic Prep, Buckeystown

School	Location	Founded	Religious order
Archbishop Curley High School	Baltimore	1961	Order of Friars Minor Conventual
Archbishop Spalding High School	Severn	1966	Sisters of Notre Dame de Namur
Bishop Walsh School	Cumberland	1966	De La Salle Christian Brothers
Calvert Hall College High School	Towson	1845	De La Salle Christian Brothers
The Catholic High School of Baltimore	Baltimore	1939	Sisters of St. Francis of Philadelphia
Cristo Rey Jesuit High School	Baltimore	2007	Society of Jesus
The John Carroll School	Bel Air	1964	–
Loyola Blakefield	Towson	1852	Society of Jesus
Maryvale Preparatory School	Brooklandville	1945	Sisters of Notre Dame de Namur
Mercy High School	Baltimore	1960	Sisters of Mercy
Mount de Sales Academy	Baltimore	1852	Order of the Visitation of Holy Mary (former) Dominican Sisters of St. Cecilia
Mount St. Joseph High School	Baltimore	1876	Xaverian Brothers
Notre Dame Preparatory School	Towson	1873	School Sisters of Notre Dame
Our Lady of Mount Carmel High School	Essex, Maryland	1959	Diocesan
St. John's Catholic Prep	Buckeystown	1829	Society of Jesus (former) School Sisters of Notre Dame (former)
St. Frances Academy	Baltimore	1828	Oblate Sisters of Providence
St. Mary's High School	Annapolis	1946	Congregation of the Most Holy Redeemer (former) School Sisters of Notre Dame (former)

== Primary schools ==
- Archbishop Borders Elementary School, Baltimore
- Cardinal Shehan School, Baltimore
- Immaculate Conception School, Towson
- Immaculate Heart of Mary School, Towson
- The Loyola School, Baltimore (independent)
- Monsignor Slade Catholic School, Glen Burnie
- Mother Mary Lange Catholic School, Baltimore
- Mother Seton Academy, Baltimore (independent)
- Mother Seton School, Emmitsburg (independent)
- Our Lady of Grace School, Parkton
- Our Lady of Hope–St. Luke School, Baltimore
- Our Lady of Perpetual Help School, Ellicott City
- Resurrection–St. Paul School, Ellicott City
- Sacred Heart School of Glyndon, Reisterstown
- School of the Cathedral of Mary Our Queen, Baltimore
- School of the Incarnation, Gambrills
- Sisters Academy of Baltimore, Baltimore (independent)
- SS. James & John School, Baltimore
- St. Augustine School, Elkridge
- St. Casimir Catholic School, Baltimore
- St. Elizabeth School, Baltimore
- St. Francis of Assisi School, Baltimore
- St. Ignatius Loyola Academy, Baltimore (independent)
- St. Joan of Arc School, Aberdeen
- St. John Regional Catholic School, Frederick
- St. John School, Westminster
- St. John the Evangelist School, Hydes
- St. John the Evangelist School, Severna Park
- St. Joseph School, Cockeysville
- St. Joseph School, Fullerton
- St. Louis School, Clarksville
- St. Margaret School, Bel Air
- St. Mark School, Catonsville
- St. Mary School, Hagerstown
- St. Mary's School, Annapolis
- St. Michael-St. Clement School, Baltimore
- St. Philip Neri School, Linthicum
- St. Stephen School, Bradshaw
- St. Thomas More Academy, Middletown (independent)
- St. Ursula School, Baltimore
- Trinity School, Ellicott City

== Former schools ==
=== Former colleges and universities ===
School	Location	Religious order	Founded	Closed
Calvert College	New Windsor	–	1852	1873
Mount St. Agnes College	Baltimore	Sisters of Mercy	1890	1972
St. Charles College	Catonsville	Society of St. Sulpice	1848	1977
St. Joseph College	Emmitsburg	Daughters of Charity of St. Vincent de Paul	1902	1973
Woodstock College	Woodstock	Society of Jesus	1869	1974

=== Former secondary schools ===
School	Location	Religious order	Founded	Closed
Archbishop Keough High School	Baltimore	School Sisters of Notre Dame	1965	1988
Cardinal Gibbons School	Baltimore	De La Salle Christian Brothers	1962	2010
Our Lady of Pompeii High School	Baltimore	–	–	2000
Our Lady of the Rosary High School	Baltimore	–	2000	2004
Seton High School	Baltimore	Daughters of Charity of St. Vincent de Paul	1865	1988
Seton Keough High School	Baltimore	–	1988	2017
Institute of Notre Dame	Baltimore	School Sisters of Notre Dame	1847	2020
St. Joseph High School	Emmitsburg	Daughters of Charity of St. Vincent de Paul	1890	1982
St. Joseph's Academy	Emmitsburg	Daughters of Charity of St. Vincent de Paul	1809	1902
St. Mary's Industrial School for Boys	Baltimore	Xaverian Brothers	1866	1950
St. Stephen's High School	Baltimore	Sisters of St. Francis	1931	1964
Towson Catholic High School	Towson	–	1922	2009
Visitation Academy of Frederick	Frederick	Order of the Visitation of Holy Mary	1846	2016

=== Former primary schools ===
School	Location	Religious order	Founded	Closed	Ref
Ascension School	Halethorpe	–	1913	2010	
Bishop John Neumann School	Baltimore	–	1974	2004	
Blessed Sacrament School	Baltimore	–	–	1972	
Father Charles Hall Catholic School	Baltimore	Franciscan Sisters of Philadelphia	1973	2010	
Holy Angels Catholic School	Baltimore	–	2012	2017	
Holy Cross School	Baltimore	Sisters of Christian Charity	1855	1972	
Holy Family School	Randallstown	–	1876	2010	
Holy Rosary Elementary School	Baltimore	Felician Sisters	1890s	1997	
Holy Spirit School	Baltimore	–	–	2004	
John Paul Regional Catholic School	Baltimore	–	–	2017	
Most Precious Blood School	Baltimore	–	1960	1988	
Mother Mary Lange Catholic School	Baltimore	Oblate Sisters of Providence	2005	2010	
Our Lady of Fatima School	Baltimore	–	1951	2010	
Our Lady of Good Counsel School	Baltimore	School Sisters of Notre Dame	1929	1972	
Our Lady of Pompeii School	Baltimore	–	–	2001	
Our Lady of Victory School	Arbutus	Sisters of Notre Dame de Namur	1957	2021	
Sacred Heart of Mary School	Baltimore	–	1925	2010	
Shrine of the Little Flower School	Bel Air	–	1926	2005	
Shrine of the Sacred Heart School	Baltimore	Sisters of Mercy	1867	2010	
St. Agnes School	Catonsville	–	1865	2025	
St. Alphonsus School	Baltimore	–	1847	2002	
St. Ambrose Catholic School	Baltimore	–	1926	2012	
St. Anthony of Padua School	Baltimore	–	1884	2005	
St. Bernadine School	Baltimore	Sisters, Servants of the Immaculate Heart of Mary	1928	2010	
St. Clare School	Essex	–	1956	2010	
St. Dominic School	Baltimore	–	1906	2005	
St. Joseph School	Taneytown	School Sisters of Notre Dame	–	1972	
St. Katharine School	Baltimore	–	1902	2010	
St. Mary, Star of the Sea School	Baltimore	Sisters of St. Joseph	1877	1972	
St. Pius X School	Rodgers Forge	–	–	2021	
St. Rose of Lima School	Baltimore	–	1914	2010	
St. Thomas Aquinas School	Baltimore	–	–	2017	
St. Wenceslaus School	Baltimore	School Sisters of Notre Dame	1879	–	
St. William of York School	Baltimore	Holy Union Sisters	1950	2010	
