= St. Stephen's High School (Bradshaw, Maryland) =

St. Stephen School

Location
- 8028 Bradshaw Road; Kingsville, Baltimore County, Maryland 21087; United States; 39°25′58.8″N 76°23′46.6″W

Information
- School type: Private, Catholic
- Motto: Faith, Values, Education
- Religious affiliation: Roman Catholic
- Patron saint: Saint Stephen
- Established: 1931; 95 years ago
- Founder: Stephanie Raphel
- President: Fr. George Gannon
- Principal: Marianne Kozlowski
- Faculty: 49
- Grades: Pre-K - 8
- Enrollment: 330
- Campus type: Suburban
- Colors: Maroon, gold
- Nickname: Eagles
- Tuition: $7,900 (2023-24)
- Website: www.ssschool.org

St. Stephen's High School - Bradshaw, MD - was part of a K-12 parish school started in 1931. Bradshaw is 3 miles NE of Kingsville, MD and about 5 miles south of Bel Air, Maryland. It was part of the Baltimore Archdiocese educational system.

== History ==
In 1841, in the home of Stephanie Raphel the Catholic education which would eventually become St. Stephen School was founded. Originally the church and school were located in the same building until the new church building was completed in 1931. The Sisters of St. Francis of Philadelphia were the original teachers of the school.

== High School (1931-1964) ==
The school moved into a frame building once the Church was finished. The first graduating class was in 1936. It remained the High School until its closure with its final class graduation in 1967. Its replacement, Archbishop John Carroll High School, opened in Bel Air, MD, in 1964 and held its first graduation in 1968.

St. Stephen's High School was set in a country picture postcard setting. The building was located in front of a wooded area. The brick convent to the west of the high school and the elementary school another brick building to the east. These buildings were located on a hill overlooking a country graveyard and the Church down at the roadside.

The building was a simple one level L-shaped structure. The main rectangular section contained classrooms that opened to a central corridor. Each classroom also had a door to the exterior. The L-shaped portion contained more classrooms including a library and a science lab. The science lab was in the basement of the L-section with a dirt floor. The typing classroom was in the basement of the Church. The curriculum consisted of two tracks, an academic and a business preparation program.

The high school did not have fancy or modern equipment; however, it had the most essential quality for education. The staff was highly dedicated caring individuals whose sole purpose in life was the nurturing and development of character driven, inquiring intellectual development of the youth in their care. These teachers took the raw material of the young people and nurtured them to strive to achieve the maximum heights of their potential while remaining grounded and sensitive to the needs of their fellow man. The school motto was fiat voluntas tua or "Thy will be done". Students were taught the essence of being a positive influence in the world, understanding that each of us has a responsibility to make the world a better place for having been here.

Most of the teachers were from the sisters of the Order of St. Francis (OSF) and a few lay teachers for health and physical education. Students attended St. Stephens from many other parishes via school bus. Routes covered: Aberdeen, Bel Air, Bradshaw, Eastpoint, Kingsville, Middle River, Overlea, Rosedale, and Baltimore City.

The largest class in the history of the school was the class of 1961. Pictures of the building and references to the yearbook can be found at the Class of 1961 Reunion site. This is a work in progress as classmates are sending in info on an ongoing basis. class-of-1961-ststephensbradshawmd.com. The yearbook for the school was called "The Glance"

== K-8 (1931-Present) ==
In 1953 a new brick building was built and became the home of the elementary portion of the school, which is still in operation. See http://www.ssschool.org/history.html for the history of the elementary school.

In 2014 a new Pre-K building was built for the students in Pre-K 3 and Pre-K 4.

In 2020 a new middle school building was completed. The new building is the first building completed in the parish and school's new redesign of the campus.
