= Thomas Mardaga =

American prelate

His Excellency, The Most Reverend Thomas Joseph Mardaga
- Bishop of Wilmington; Titular Bishop of Mutugenna
- See: Bishop of Wilmington
- Installed: April 6, 1968
- Term ended: May 28, 1984
- Predecessor: Michael Hyle
- Successor: Robert Mulvee
- Other posts: Auxiliary Bishop of Baltimore (1966 to 1968); Titular Bishop of Mutugenna (1967–1968)

Orders
- Ordination: May 14, 1940 by Michael Joseph Curley
- Consecration: January 25, 1967 by Lawrence Shehan

Personal details
- Born: May 14, 1913 Baltimore, Maryland, US
- Died: May 28, 1984 (aged 71) Wilmington, Delaware, US
- Denomination: Roman Catholic Church
- Education: St. Charles College; St. Mary's Seminary
- Motto: Ad regnum Christi (To the kingdom of Christ)

Styles of Thomas Joseph Mardaga
- Reference style: His Excellency; The Most Reverend
- Spoken style: Your Excellency
- Religious style: bishop

Thomas Joseph Mardaga (May 14, 1913 – May 28, 1984) was an American prelate of the Roman Catholic Church. He served as bishop of the Diocese of Wilmington in Delaware from 1968 until his death in 1984. He previously served as an auxiliary bishop of the Archdiocese of Baltimore in Maryland from 1966 to 1968.

== Biography ==
=== Early life ===
Thomas Mardaga was born on May 14, 1913, in Baltimore, Maryland, to Thomas and Agnes (née Ryan) Mardaga. He received his early education at the parochial school of St. Ann Parish in Baltimore. He attended St. Charles College in Catonsville, Maryland before studying for the priesthood at St. Mary's Seminary in Baltimore.

=== Priesthood ===
Mardaga was ordained a priest in Baltimore for the Archdiocese of Baltimore by Archbishop Michael J. Curley on May 14, 1940. Mardaga then served as a curate at St. Paul Parish in Baltimore until being transferred to the Basilica of the Assumption, where he later became rector. In addition to his pastoral work, he served as archdiocesan director of the Catholic Youth Organization and the Confraternity of Christian Doctrine, executive secretary of the Catholic Charities Fund, and a member of the archdiocesan board of consultors. Mardaga was named a domestic prelate by the Vatican in 1963.

=== Auxiliary Bishop of Baltimore ===
On December 9, 1966, Mardaga was appointed auxiliary bishop of Baltimore and titular bishop of Mutugenna by Pope Paul VI. He received his episcopal consecration on January 25, 1967, at the Basilica of the Assumption of the Blessed Virgin Mary in Baltimore from Cardinal Lawrence Shehan, with Bishops John Russell and Thomas Murphy serving as co-consecrators, at the Cathedral of Mary Our Queen in Baltimore. As an auxiliary bishop, he continued to serve as rector of the Basilica of the Assumption.

=== Bishop of Wilmington ===
Following the death of Bishop Michael Hyle, Mardaga was named by Paul VI as the sixth bishop of Wilmington on March 9, 1968. His installation took place at St. Elizabeth Church in Wilmington, Delaware on April 6, 1968. During his 16-year tenure, Mardaga continued the implementation of the reforms of the Second Vatican Council, establishing a council for the laity and participating in ecumenical work. He also reorganized the diocesan curia and created a ministry for migrant workers.

=== Death ===
Thomas Mardaga died on May 28, 1984, at age 71 from cancer at St. Francis Hospital in Wilmington.

Catholic Church titles
Preceded by Michael William Hyle	Bishop of Wilmington; 1968–1984	Succeeded by Robert Edward Mulvee
