= Michael Angelo Saltarelli =

American prelate

His Excellency, The Most Reverend Michael Angelo Saltarelli
- Bishop of Wilmington
- See: Wilmington
- Installed: January 23, 1996
- Term ended: July 7, 2008
- Predecessor: Robert Mulvee
- Successor: William Malooly
- Other post: Titular Bishop of Mesarfelta (1990–1995)

Orders
- Ordination: May 28, 1960 by Thomas Aloysius Boland
- Consecration: July 30, 1990 by Theodore McCarrick

Personal details
- Born: January 17, 1932 Jersey City, New Jersey, US
- Died: October 8, 2009 (aged 77) Wilmington, Delaware, US
- Denomination: Roman Catholic Church
- Education: Seton Hall University; Immaculate Conception Seminary
- Motto: Obedience to Jesus Christ

Styles of Michael Angelo Saltarelli
- Reference style: Most Reverend
- Spoken style: Your Excellency
- Religious style: Bishop
- Posthumous style: not applicable

Michael Angelo Saltarelli (January 17, 1932 – October 8, 2009) was an American prelate of the Roman Catholic Church. He served as bishop of Wilmington in Delaware from 1995 to 2008. He previously served as an auxiliary bishop of the Archdiocese of Newark in New Jersey from 1990 to 1995.

== Biography ==
=== Early life ===
One of seven children, Michael Saltarelli was born on January 17, 1932, in Jersey City, New Jersey, to Michael and Caroline (née Marzitello) Saltarelli. Former Boston College football player Brian Toal is Michael Saltarelli's grandnephew.

Saltarelli attended James J. Ferris High School in Jersey City and later Seton Hall University in South Orange, New Jersey, where he obtained a Bachelor of Arts degree in 1956. Saltarelli then studied at Immaculate Conception Seminary in Darlington, New Jersey.

=== Priesthood ===
Saltarelli was ordained to the priesthood at the Cathedral of the Sacred Heart in Newark for the Archdiocese of Newark by Archbishop Thomas Boland on May 28, 1960. Saltarelli first served as an associate pastor at Holy Family Parish in Nutley, New Jersey, from 1960 to 1977, earning a Master of Religious Studies degree from Manhattan College in New York City in 1975. He was then appointed as pastor of Our Lady of Assumption Parish in Bayonne, New Jersey, serving there until 1982. Saltarelli was then named executive director for pastoral services in the archdiocese. He was raised by the Vatican to the rank of honorary prelate in 1984.

Saltarelli was named pastor of St. Catherine of Siena Parish in Cedar Grove, New Jersey, in June 1985, and vicar for priests in November 1987. He also served as dean of North Essex, Bayonne, and West Essex in New Jersey. He served two terms as a member of and one term as president of the Priests' Personnel Board, and was a member of the archdiocesan school board.

=== Auxiliary Bishop of Newark ===
On June 2, 1990, Saltarelli was appointed as an auxiliary bishop of Newark and titular bishop of Mesarfelta by Pope John Paul II. He received his episcopal consecration on July 30, 1990, from Archbishop Theodore McCarrick, with Archbishop Peter Gerety and Bishop John Smith serving as co-consecrators. He selected as his episcopal motto: "Obedience to Jesus Christ."

As an auxiliary to McCarrick, Saltarelli served as rector of Sacred Heart Cathedral and continued to serve as Vicar for Priests. He was also the national episcopal moderator of the Holy Name Society and New Jersey State Chaplain of the Knights of Columbus.

=== Bishop of Wilmington ===
Saltarelli was named by John Paul II as the eighth bishop of Wilmington on November 21, 1995. He succeeded Bishop Robert E. Mulvee, and was formally installed on January 23, 1996.

During his tenure, Saltarelli oversaw an increase of over 60,000 Catholics in the diocese, ordained 23 priests and 47 permanent deacons, and constructed or renovated numerous churches, schools, and other facilities. He also expanded ministries to Hispanics, and established a group of Delawarean Catholics dedicated to preventing legislation that would legalize cloning and the use of human embryos for medical research. He released the names of 20 diocesan priests accused of sexual abuse, and once said, "I condemn what's been done to victims with all my heart." In 2006, Saltarelli refused to allow a student center at Archmere Academy in Claymont, Delaware to be named after US Senator Joe Biden, an Archmere alumnus and pro-choice politician.

== Retirement and legacy ==
Upon reaching the mandatory retirement age of 75, Saltarelli submitted his resignation to Pope Benedict XVI in January 2007 (however, his year of birth was still publicly listed as 1933, with 1932 not being publicized until after his death). His resignation was accepted by the pope on July 7, 2008, and he served as apostolic administrator of Wilmington until the installation of his successor, Bishop William F. Malooly, on September 8, 2008.

Saltarelli underwent an emergency quadruple-bypass surgery on April 2, 2009. Saltarelli suffered from cancer that started as bone cancer and had spread. Michael Saltarelli died on October 8, 2009, at age 77 in Wilmington, Delaware.

Catholic Church titles
Preceded by Robert Edward Mulvee	Bishop of Wilmington; 1995–2008	Succeeded by William Francis Malooly
Preceded by –	Auxiliary Bishop of Newark, New Jersey; 1990–1995	Succeeded by –
