= Coffee Run Mission Site =

Historic district in New Castle County, Delaware

- U.S. National Register of Historic Places
- U.S. Historic district
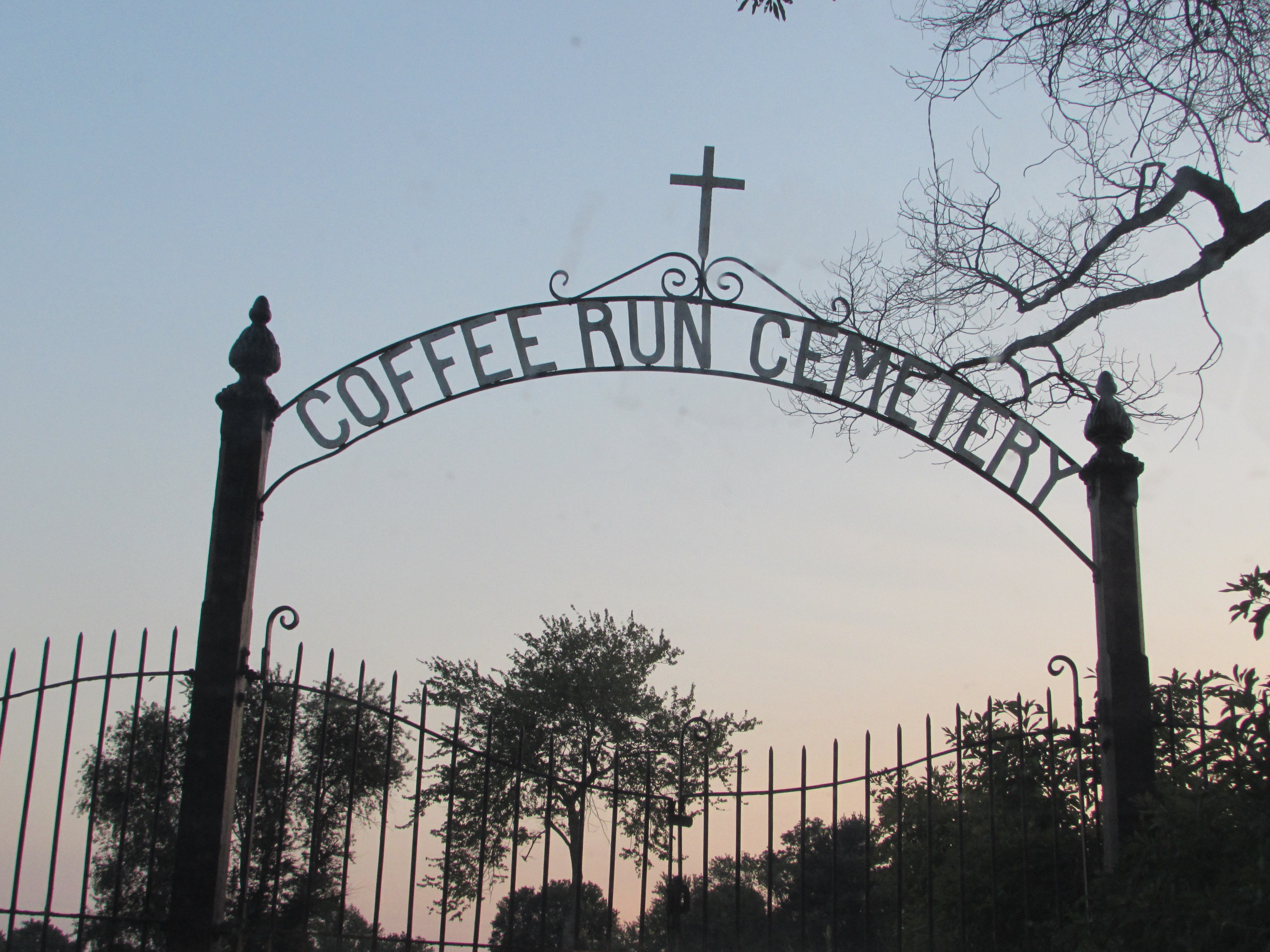
- Gate to the cemetery at the Coffee Run mission

- Location within Delaware Location within the United States
- Location: 6580 Lancaster Pike, Hockessin, Delaware
- Coordinates: 39°46′3″N 75°39′34″W
- Area: 1 acre (0.40 ha)
- Built: 1812
- NRHP reference No.: 73000509
- Added to NRHP: April 11, 1973

Coffee Run Mission Site, also known as Coffee Run Church and St. Mary's Church, is a historic mission church site and national historic district located at Hockessin, Delaware. It encompasses two contributing buildings, both now demolished, and one contributing site. They were the Father Kenney House and stone barn with frame addition. The house was built in 1812, and was a two-story, three bay stone dwelling with a cross-gable roof. The Coffee Run cemetery is the burial ground of the first Catholic church in Delaware. It measures approximately 66 feet by 183 feet and includes over 50 carved headstones and 12 uncut stone markers. Located at the cemetery is a small cinder block building, which contains an altar, and stands at the site of the original log mission church built about 1790. It was the first Catholic church in Delaware out of which grew the present Roman Catholic Diocese of Wilmington. The house was demolished in March 2010 following an arson. The barn, also affected by arson, remained mostly intact but in a decaying condition. Trinity Community Church planned to restore it and incorporate it into a new church on the site, but discovered that the mortar was no longer sound. The barn was demolished in 2016 and the stone saved for reuse in the facade of the new church.

It was listed on the National Register of Historic Places in 1973.
