= Diocese of Wilmington =

Latin Catholic ecclesiastical jurisdiction in Delaware and Maryland, United States

Coordinates: 39°44′34.7″N 75°33′11.56″W

Diocese of Wilmington Dioecesis Wilmingtoniensis

Catholic
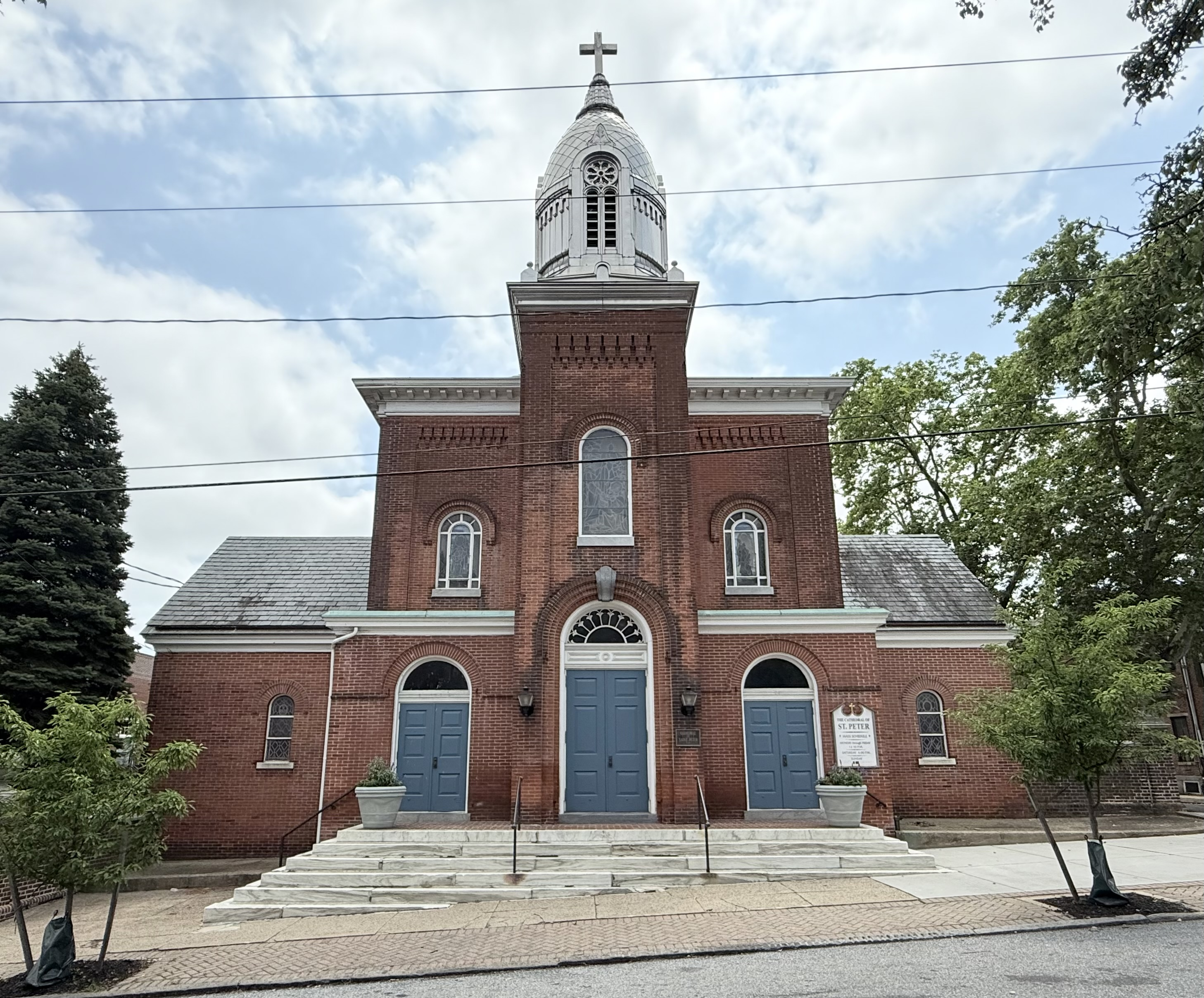
- Cathedral of St. Peter

- Coat of arms

Location
- Country: United States
- Territory: Delaware; The nine counties on the Eastern Shore of Maryland: Caroline, Cecil, Dorchester, Kent, Queen Anne's, Somerset, Talbot, Wicomico, and Worcester
- Ecclesiastical province: Baltimore

Statistics
- Area: 13,916 km^{2} (5,373 sq mi)
- Population: Total; Catholics: (as of 2023); ▲1,508,853; ▼246,174 (▼16.3%)
- Parishes: 56

Information
- Denomination: Catholic
- Sui iuris church: Latin Church
- Rite: Roman Rite
- Established: March 3, 1868 (158 years ago)
- Cathedral: Cathedral of Saint Peter
- Patron saint: St. Francis de Sales
- Secular priests: 106, plus 54 religious priests

Current leadership
- Pope: Leo XIV
- Bishop: William Edward Koenig
- Metropolitan Archbishop: William E. Lori
- Bishops emeritus: William Francis Malooly

Map
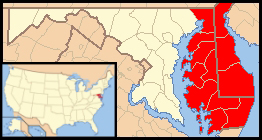

Website
- cdow.org

The Diocese of Wilmington (Latin: Dioecesis Wilmingtoniensis) is a Latin Church ecclesiastical diocese of the Catholic Church in the eastern United States, comprising the entire state of Delaware and the Eastern Shore Region of Maryland. William Koenig is the bishop.

== History ==
=== 1600 to 1700 ===
The first Catholic church in the Delmarva Peninsula was Wye Chapel, erected near present-day Easton, Maryland. The Jesuit Nicholas Gulick served as its resident pastor. The chapel served as a base for priests to visit other communities in the region. In 1590, after Delaware became a royal colony, the chapel was shut down after King William III of England prohibited the practice of Catholicism.

=== 1700 to 1800 ===
Before and during the American Revolutionary War, the Catholics in all of the British colonies in America were under the jurisdiction of the Apostolic Vicariate of the London District in England. The first Catholic mission in Delaware was established by Jesuit missionaries near present-day Blackbird in 1747. However, in Easton, James Beadnall, another Jesuit priest, was arrested for celebrating a mass in a private home.

After the end of the American Revolution in 1783, Pope Pius VI erected the Prefecture Apostolic of the United States in 1784, encompassing the entire United States. Five years later, he converted the prefecture into the Diocese of Baltimore. St. Mary of the Assumption was the first Catholic church in Delaware, built by White Clay Creek in 1788.

=== 1800 to 1868 ===
Patrick Kenney established a mission in 1804 on the site of the Coffee Run Cemetery in Mill Creek. The Coffee Run Mission Site was listed on the National Register of Historic Places in 1973. (Note: The title of the on-line article differs from the title of the article as it appeared in print)

in 1808, Pope Pius VII erected the Diocese of Philadelphia out of the Archdiocese of Baltimore, placing all of Delaware into the new diocese. Delaware would remain part of the Diocese of Philadelphia for the next 60 years. The first Catholic church in Wilmington was started in 1816.

=== 1868 to 1900 ===
On March 3, 1868, Pope Pius IX erected the Diocese of Wilmington. The new diocese contained the following counties:

- All the counties in Delaware, taken from the Diocese of Philadelphia
- Caroline, Cecil, Dorchester, Kent, Queen Anne's, Somerset, Talbot, Wicomico, and Worcester counties in Maryland, taken from the Diocese of Philadelphia
- Accomack and Northampton counties in Virginia, taken from the Archdiocese of Baltimore.

Pius IX designated the new diocese as a suffragan diocese of the Archdiocese of Baltimore. He appointed Thomas Becker of Baltimore as the first bishop of Wilmington. In 1868, the Sisters of the Visitation of the Holy Mary moved into a convent in Wilmington.The first Catholic church in Easton, Maryland, Sts Peter and Paul, was dedicated also in 1858.

Becker oversaw a three-fold increase in the number of priests a doubling of churches. He established an orphanage and academy for boys and two additional parochial schools. After 18 years in Wilmington, Becker was appointed in 1886 by Pope Leo XIII as bishop of the Diocese of Savannah.

To replace Becker, Leo XIII in 1886 appointed Alfred Curtis as the second bishop of Wilmington. During his tenure as bishop, Curtis introduced the Josephite Fathers into the diocese to minister to African-American Catholics. In 1890, Curtis dedicated St. Joseph Church, a parish for African-Americans in Wilmington run by the Josephites.At that time, Delaware law banned African-Americans from White churches..

Twice a year, Curtis would visit the New Castle County Almshouse in Farmhurst to minister to the poor and bring them food. When he took office, Curtis discovered that all the church property in the diocese was under the personal name of the bishop. He spent the next few years legally transferring all the property to the diocese itself. He also led efforts to clear the sizable debt held by the diocese and its parishes.

The Josephite priest John de Ruyter in 1893 opened St. Joseph's Orphanage in Wilmington for African-American boys; it was the first such orphanage in the United States. That same year, the Ursuline Sisters of Bedford Park moved from New York City to Wilmington to start the Ursuline Academy Wilmington for girls.

=== 1900 to 1960 ===
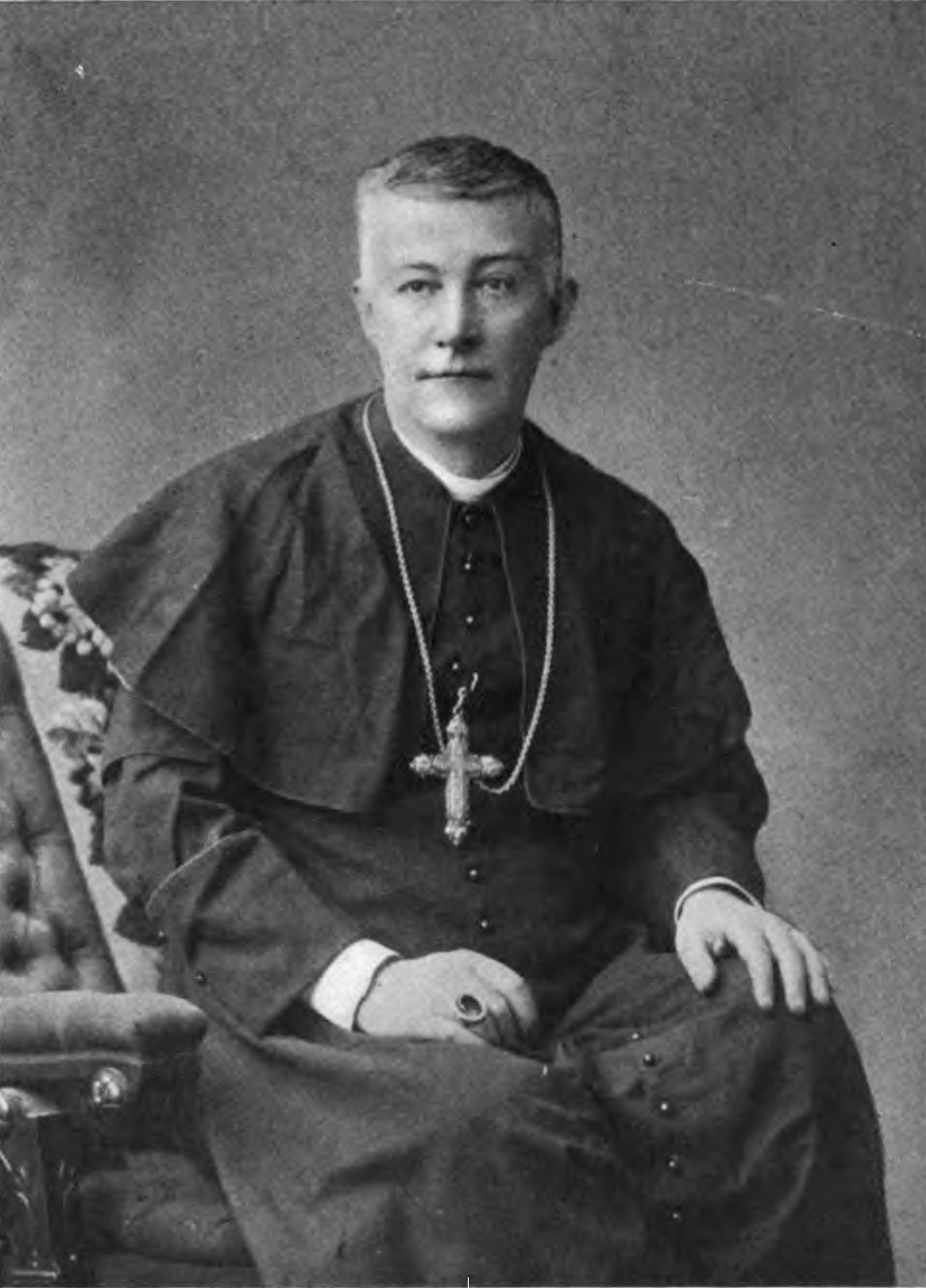
Bishop Curtis (pre-1914)

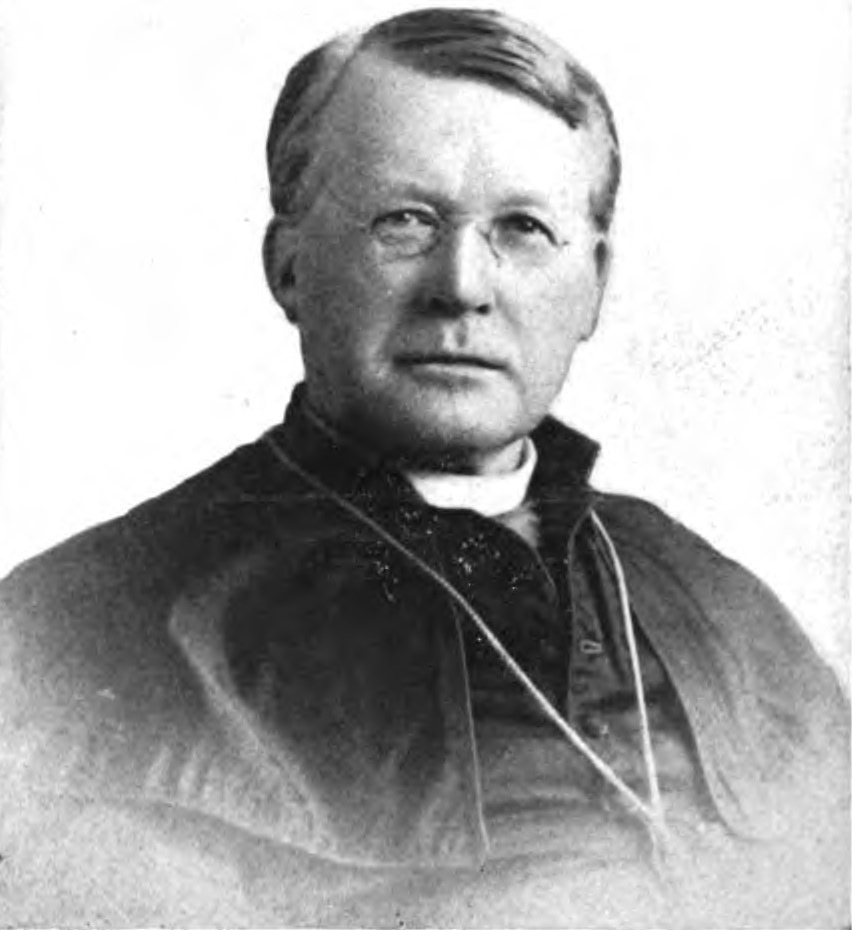
Bishop Becker (pre-1914)

Curtis retired as bishop of Wilmington in 1896 due to poor health. Leo XIII in 1897 appointed John Monaghan of the Diocese of Charleston as his replacement. When Monaghan became bishop, the diocese had 25,000 Catholics, 30 priests, 22 churches and 18 missions, 12 seminarians, eight religious communities, three academies, nine parochial schools, and three orphanages. During his tenure, Monaghan established seven parishes, seven missions, eight schools and a home for the elderly.The Oblate Fathers in 1903 opened the Salesianum, a secondary school for boys in Wilmington. The Sisters of Saint Francis of Philadelphia opened St. Francis Hospital in Wilmington in 1924. It is today Saint Francis Healthcare.

Monaghan retired as bishop of Wilmington in 1925; his successor was Edmond Fitzmaurice from Philadelphia. During his 35-year tenure, Fitzmaurice oversaw an increase in the Catholic population from 34,000 to 85,000. To accommodate these numbers, he founded 17 new parishes, eight missions, and 19 elementary and nine secondary schools. Fitzmaurice encouraged participation in Catholic Charities, and founded the Catholic Welfare Guild, Catholic Youth Organization, Society for the Propagation of the Faith, and Knights of Columbus chapter in the diocese. He also established the Catholic Interracial Council, the Catholic Forum of the Air, the Catholic Television Guild, the Diocesan Book Forum, the Catholic Education Guild, and the Young Christian Workers.

In 1945, Fitzmaurice ordered the parents of Catholic students in public high schools in the diocese to prohibit their children from attending sex education courses, which he described as "offensive to the Catholic conscience."Pope Pius XII in 1958 appointed Michael Hyle of Baltimore as coadjutor bishop in Wilmington to assist Fitzmaurice. He donated his personal residence in 1959 to provide a location for the founding of St. Edmond's Academy in Wilmington, which was named in his honor.

=== 1960 to 1985 ===
When Fitzmaurice resigned in 1960 as bishop of Wilmington, Hyle automatically succeeded him. He dedicated much of his administration to the implementation of the Second Vatican Council reforms of the early 1960s, encouraging parishes to form parish councils and to embrace the ecumenical movement. Hyle started construction on St. Mark's High School in Wilmington, which opened in 1970. He also inaugurated the University of Delaware's Newman Centre (Thomas More Oratory) in Newark. Hyle died in 1967. Pope Paul VI in 1968 appointed Auxiliary Bishop Thomas Mardaga from Baltimore as the next bishop of Wilmington.

During his 16-year tenure, Mardaga continued the implementation of the Second Vatican Council reforms, establishing a council for the laity and participating in ecumenical work. He also reorganized the diocesan curia and created a ministry for migrant workers.

In 1974, Paul VI transferred the two Virginia counties in the Diocese of Wilmington to the Diocese of Richmond, establishing the present territory of the diocese. Following Mardaga's death in 1984, Pope John Paul II in 1985 named Auxiliary Bishop Robert Mulvee from the Diocese of Manchester as Mardaga's replacement.

=== 1985 to present ===
During his tenure as bishop of Wilmington, Mulvee emphasized collegiality in his administration of the diocese, helped restructure the Delmarva Ecumenical Agency into the Christian Council of Delaware and Maryland's Eastern Shore, and founded three new missions and raised a fourth to parish status. Mulvee's tenure in Wilmington ended in 1995 when John Paul II named him as coadjutor bishop for the Diocese of Providence.

John Paul II appointed Auxiliary Bishop Michael Saltarelli of the Archdiocese of Newark as Mulvee's replacement in Wilmington in 1996. During his tenure, Saltarelli oversaw an increase of over 60,000 Catholics in the diocese, ordained 23 priests and 47 permanent deacons, and constructed or renovated numerous churches, schools, and other facilities. After Saltarelli retired as bishop of Wilmington in 2007, Pope Benedict XVI in 2008 named Auxiliary Bishop W. Francis Malooly of Baltimore to replace him. Malooly was criticized by some Catholic news outlets for refusing to withhold communion from then Vice President Joseph Biden due to his position on abortion rights for women.

In 2009, the diocese filed for Chapter 11 bankruptcy in the face of financial liabilities from lawsuits regarding sexual abuse by priests.Malooly retired as bishop of Wilmington in 2021 and Pope Francis that same year appointed William Koenig of the Diocese of Rockville Centre as his replacement As of 2026, Koenig is the current bishop of Wilmington.

=== Sexual abuse cases ===
Joseph Curry, a former altar boy at St. Dennis Church in Galena, sued the Diocese of Wilmington in August 2008. Curry claimed that he had been sexually abused over 100 times by Edward B. Carley. The abuse started in 1981, when Curry was 10 years old. The lawsuit claimed that the diocese knew that Carley had sexually abused parishioners at St. Ann's Church in Wilmington during the 1950s and early 1960s. Carley died in 1998. Curry and the diocese settled the lawsuit in 2011 for $1.7 million.

In 2011, a bankruptcy court approved a settlement plan for the diocese. Under the plan, 150 victims were to receive an average payment of $310,000 each, totaling $77.425 million. The clergy accused of abuse were not identified.

== Bishops ==
=== Bishops of Wilmington ===
1. Thomas Albert Andrew Becker (1868–1886), appointed Bishop of Savannah
2. Alfred Allen Paul Curtis (1886–1897)
3. John James Joseph Monaghan (1897–1925)
4. Edmond John Fitzmaurice (1925–1960), appointed Archbishop ad personam upon retirement in 1960
  - Hubert James Cartwright, Coadjutor Bishop (1956-1958)
5. Michael William Hyle (1960–1967; coadjutor bishop 1958-1960)
6. Thomas Joseph Mardaga (1968–1984)
7. Robert Edward Mulvee (1985–1995), appointed Coadjutor Bishop of Providence and later succeeded to that see
8. Michael Angelo Saltarelli (1996–2008)
9. William Francis Malooly (2008–2021)
10. William Edward Koenig (2021–present)

=== Other diocesan priests who became bishops ===
- Benjamin Joseph Keiley (priest here 1873–1886), appointed Bishop of Savannah in 1900
- James C. Burke, O.P., was Territorial Prelate of Chimbote (1965-1978, being consecrated bishop in 1967) before serving here 1978-1994
- John Barres, appointed Bishop of Allentown in 2009 and later Bishop of Rockville Centre

== Education ==
=== High schools ===
As of 2026, the Diocese of Wilmington had eight high schools:

- Archmere Academy - Claymont
- Holy Cross High School - Dover
- Padua Academy - Wilmington
- Saint Elizabeth School - Wilmington
- Saint Mark's High School - Wilmington
- Saints Peter & Paul High School - Easton, Maryland
- Salesianum School - Wilmington
- Ursuline Academy - Wilmington

=== Elementary schools ===
As of 2026, the Diocese of Wilmington had 20 elementary and middle schools:

- Aquinas Academy – Bear
- Christ the Teacher Catholic School – Newark
- Good Shepherd Catholic School – Perryville, MD
- Holy Angels School – Newark
- Holy Cross School – Dover
- Immaculate Heart of Mary School – Wilmington
- Most Blessed Sacrament Catholic School – Ocean Pines, MD
- Mount Aviat Academy – Childs, MD
- Nativity Preparatory School – Wilmington
- Saint Ann School – Wilmington
- Saint Edmond's Academy – Wilmington
- Saint Francis de Sales School – Salisbury, MD
- Saint John the Beloved School – Wilmington
- Saint Mary Magdalen School – Wilmington
- Saint Peter Cathedral School – Wilmington
- Saints Peter & Paul Elementary School – Easton, MD
- Serviam Girls Academy – New Castle
- St. Anthony of Padua Grade School – Wilmington
- St. Elizabeth School – Wilmington
- Ursuline Academy – Wilmington
