= Edmond John Fitzmaurice =

Catholic bishop (1881–1962)

The Most Reverend Edmond John Fitzmaurice
- Bishop of Wilmington
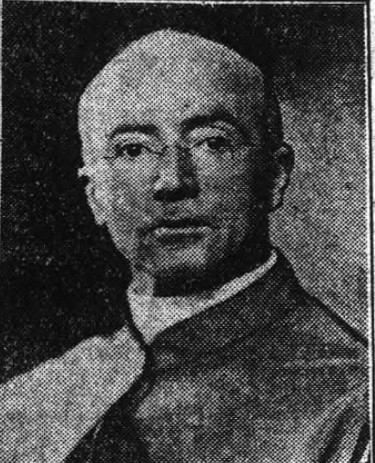
- See: Diocese of Wilmington
- Installed: November 30, 1925
- Term ended: March 2, 1960
- Predecessor: John James Joseph Monaghan
- Successor: Michael William Hyle
- Other post: Titular Archbishop of Constantia in Scythia

Orders
- Ordination: May 28, 1904 by Pietro Respighi
- Consecration: November 30, 1925 by Dennis Joseph Dougherty

Personal details
- Born: June 24, 1881 Tarbert, County Kerry, Ireland
- Died: July 26, 1962 (aged 81) Wilmington, Delaware, US
- Denomination: Roman Catholic Church
- Education: St Brendan's College, Killarney; College of Sint-Truiden; Pontifical North American College
- Motto: Virtute non verbis (By deeds, not by words)

Styles of Edmond John Fitzmaurice
- Reference style: His Excellency; The Most Reverend
- Spoken style: Your Excellency
- Religious style: bishop

Edmond John Fitzmaurice (June 24, 1881 – July 26, 1962) was an Irish-born American prelate of the Roman Catholic Church. He served as bishop of the Diocese of Wilmington in Delaware from 1925 to 1960.

== Biography ==
=== Early life and education ===
Edmond Fitzmaurice was born on June 24, 1881, in Leitrim West, County Kerry in Ireland to William and Johanna (née Costello) Fitzmaurice. His uncle, John Edmund Fitzmaurice, became bishop of the Diocese of Erie in Pennsylvania.

Fitzmaurice studied at St. Brendan's College in Killarney, Ireland, and at the College of Sint-Truiden in Sint-Truiden, Belgium. He continued his studies at the Pontifical North American College in Rome, where he earned a Doctor of Sacred Theology degree.

=== Ordination and ministry ===
Fitzmaurice was ordained to the priesthood for the Archdiocese of Philadelphia in Rome by Cardinal Pietro Respighi on May 28, 1904. After his ordination, Fitzmaurice immigrated to the United States in 1904, becoming a curate at Annunciation Parish in Philadelphia, Pennsylvania. He served as professor of theology at St. Charles Borromeo Seminary in Wynnewood, Pennsylvania, from 1906 to 1914. During this period, Fitzmaurice became a naturalized U.S. citizen. He was appointed chancellor of the archdiocese, serving in this role until 1920. From 1920 to 1925, Fitzmaurice served as rector of St. Charles Seminary.

=== Bishop of Wilmington ===
On July 24, 1925, Fitzmaurice was appointed the fourth bishop of Wilmington by Pope Pius XI. He received his episcopal consecration at the Cathedral of Saints Peter and Paul in Philadelphia on November 30, 1925, from Cardinal Dennis Dougherty, with Bishops John Swint and Andrew Brennan serving as co-consecrators.

During his 35-year tenure in Wilmington, Fitzmaurice oversaw an increase in the Catholic population from 34,000 to 85,000. To accommodate these numbers, he founded 17 new parishes, 8 missions, and 19 elementary and 9 secondary schools. He donated his personal residence in 1959 to provide a location for the founding of St. Edmond's Academy, which was named in his honor.

Fitzmaurice encouraged participation in Catholic Charities, and founded the Catholic Welfare Guild, Catholic Youth Organization, Society for the Propagation of the Faith, and Knights of Columbus chapter in the diocese. He also established the Catholic Interracial Council, the Catholic Forum of the Air, the Catholic Television Guild, the Diocesan Book Forum, the Catholic Education Guild, and the Young Christian Workers. In 1945, Fitzmaurice ordered the Catholic parents of students in public high schools in the diocese to prohibit their children from attending sex education courses, which he described as "offensive to the Catholic conscience."

In 1956, Pope Pius XII appointed Reverend Hubert James Cartwright as coadjutor bishop of Wilmington to assist Fitzmaurice. When Cartwright died in 1958, Pope Pius appointed Michael William Hyle as the new coadjutor bishop.

=== Retirement and legacy ===
Pope John XXIII accepted Fitzmaurice's resignation as bishop of Wilmington on March 2, 1960, and appointed him as titular archbishop of Constantia in Scythia. He became the first priest of the Diocese of Wilmington to be named archbishop.

Edmond Fitzmaurice died at St. Francis Hospital in Wilmington on July 26, 1962, at age 81.

Catholic Church titles
Preceded by John James Joseph Monaghan	Bishop of Wilmington; 1925–1960	Succeeded by Michael William Hyle
