= St. Mark's High School =

Private, coeducational, diocesan school in Wilmington, Delaware, United States

Saint Mark's High School

Location
- 2501 Pike Creek Road; Wilmington, New Castle County, Delaware 19808; United States; 39.7179°N 75.6893°W

Information
- Type: Private, coeducational, Diocesan
- Religious affiliations: Roman Catholic (School Sisters of Notre Dame, Sisters, Servants of the Immaculate Heart of Mary)
- Established: 1969 (57 years ago)
- Status: Open
- Oversight: Diocese of Wilmington
- CEEB code: 080194
- President: Patrick Tiernan
- Dean: Robert Megearle
- Principal: Eileen Wilkinson Ed.D
- Grades: 9–12
- Enrollment: 1020 students
- Average class size: 20 students
- Student to teacher ratio: 11 students: 1 teacher
- Colors: Dark green, gold, white
- Slogan: All Things Possible
- Athletics: www.spartanssports.com
- Mascot: Markus (Spartan)
- Nickname: Saint Mark's
- Team name: Spartans
- Accreditation: Middle States Association of Colleges and Schools
- Yearbook: Spark
- Tuition: $16,600
- Nobel laureates: 1
- Website: www.stmarkshs.net

Saint Mark's High School is a coeducational Roman Catholic high school located at 2501 Pike Creek Road, in unincorporated New Castle County, Delaware, with a Wilmington postal address. The school is administrated by the Roman Catholic Diocese of Wilmington. It is accredited by the Middle States Association of Colleges and Schools.

== Notable alumni ==
- Nicole Bosso, former Miss Delaware USA
- John Carney, Mayor of Wilmington (2025–Present), Governor of Delaware (2017–2025), former U.S. Representative from Delaware (2011-2017) and former Lieutenant Governor of Delaware (2001–2009)
- Louis Carlet, union organizer
- Tom Douglas, Seattle chef and restaurateur
- Kevin Mench, retired Major League Baseball player.
- Mario Pino, horse racing jockey
- David Plouffe, campaign manager for Barack Obama
- Keith Powell, television actor
- Pedro Swann, former MLB player
- Steve Watson, NFL wide receiver
