= St. Edmond's Academy =

Coordinates: 39.8041°N 75.4901°W

Saint Edmond's Academy

Location
- 2120 Veale Road; Wilmington, Delaware 19810; United States

Information
- Type: Catholic
- Motto: Building Boys of Character in a Community of Faith
- Established: 1959
- Head of school: Domenic Maiorano
- Grades: K-8
- Enrollment: approx. 242
- Team name: The Lancers
- Website: www.stedmondsacademy.org

Saint Edmond's Academy is an independent Catholic primary school for boys founded by the Congregation of Holy Cross in Wilmington, Delaware, United States in 1959. The school's patron saint is Saint André of Montreal.

== History ==
Saint Edmond's Academy was founded to meet the academic needs of Catholic Boys in Wilmington. Ursuline Academy provided 1-5 education for both boys and girls, but became exclusively a girls' school beginning in grade 6, leaving boys without a comparable option. Wilmington's Bishop Edmond John FitzMaurice offered his residence for the original school. The name "St. Edmond's" was chosen in honor of the Bishop.

The School soon outgrew this space located in downtown Wilmington at 1301 Delaware Ave. In 1963, it moved to its current location north of the city at 2120 Veale Rd.

The school recently completed a major $12 million expansion in 2006, significantly increasing the size of the school buildings. Beginning with the 2006–07 school year, it expanded from serving grades 4–8 to its current Kindergarten - 8th grade classes.

== Facilities ==
The Saint Edmond's Academy campus includes 25 acres (100,000 m^{2}) of land. It has 30 classrooms, a state-of-the-art science lab, a field house, an art room, chapel, a library, a model train room, choral room, band room, cafeteria, two gymnasiums, extended day care facilities, a 450-seat auditorium, a baseball field, soccer field, and a 400-meter all-weather track.

== Notable alumni ==
- Lieutenant Colonel Marty Devine (1970) US Army, Iraq War Veteran
- Darryl Parson (1979) Deputy Attorney General, Delaware Dept. of Justice
- Michel Troy (1981) Assoc. General Counsel Center for Individual Rights
- Kester Irwin Hanley Crosse II (1984) - Gastroenterologist Columbia, MD
- Michael Medico (1986) - Actor/Director/Producer
