= W. Francis Malooly =

American prelate

His Excellency, The Most Reverend William Francis Malooly
- Bishop Emeritus of Wilmington
- Diocese: Wilmington
- Appointed: July 7, 2008
- Installed: September 8, 2008
- Retired: April 30, 2021
- Predecessor: Michael Saltarelli
- Successor: William Edward Koenig
- Previous post: Auxiliary Bishop of Baltimore and Titular Bishop of Flumenzer (2001–2008)

Orders
- Ordination: May 9, 1970 by Thomas Austin Murphy
- Consecration: March 1, 2001 by William Henry Keeler, William Donald Borders, and William Clifford Newman

Personal details
- Born: January 18, 1944 (age 82) Baltimore, Maryland, US
- Denomination: Roman Catholic Church
- Education: St. Charles College; St. Mary's Seminary
- Motto: Rejoice in the Lord

Styles of William Francis Malooly
- Reference style: His Excellency; The Most Reverend
- Spoken style: Your Excellency
- Religious style: Bishop

William Francis Malooly (born January 18, 1944) is an American prelate of the Roman Catholic Church. Malooly served as the bishop of the Diocese of Wilmington in Delaware from 2008 until 2021. He previously served as an auxiliary bishop of the Archdiocese of Baltimore in Maryland from 2000 to 2008.

== Biography ==
=== Early life and education ===
Francis Malooly was born in Baltimore, Maryland, on January 18, 1944. He attended St. Ursula School in Parkville, Maryland, then entered St. Charles College in Catonsville, Maryland, for his secondary and undergraduate education. Malooly received his seminary training at St. Mary's Seminary in Baltimore

=== Priesthood ===
Malooly was ordained to the priesthood for the Archdiocese of Baltimore by his uncle, Bishop Thomas Murphy, on May 9, 1970, in the parish church of St. Ursula Malooly's first assignment after ordination was as associate pastor in 1970 at St. Joseph Parish in Texas. In 1976, he was posted to St. Anthony of Padua Parish in Baltimore. Malooly in 1981 was appointed associate administrator of the Catholic Youth Organization Retreat House in Sparks, Maryland, later serving as its administrator.

In 1984, Malooly was appointed director of clergy personnel for the archdiocese, then in 1989 was named chancellor and vicar general. Malooly was elevated by the Vatican in 1990 to the rank of an honorary prelate. In April 1999, he was awarded the President's Medal by St. Mary's Seminary and University.

=== Auxiliary Bishop of Baltimore ===
On December 12, 2000, Malooly was appointed auxiliary bishop of the Archdiocese of Baltimore and titular bishop of Flumenzer by Pope John Paul II. He received his episcopal ordination on March 1, 2001, from Cardinal William Keeler, with Archbishop William Borders and Bishop William Newman serving as co-consecrators, in the Cathedral of Mary Our Queen in Baltimore.

In addition to his role as auxiliary bishop, Malooly was later named western vicar of the archdiocese, serving the thirty-eight parishes and six missions in Allegany, Carroll, Frederick, Garrett, Howard, and Washington counties in Maryland.

In 2006, Malooly received the Cardinal Shehan Award from the Archdiocesan Youth Office and an honorary doctorate in humane letters from Mount Saint Mary's University. He was also a member of the Knights of Malta, and a board member of Good Samaritan Hospital in Baltimore, St. Mary's Seminary and University, and Mount Saint Mary's University in Emmitsburg, Maryland.

=== Bishop of Wilmington ===
On July 7, 2008, Pope Benedict XVI appointed Malooly as bishop of Wilmington. He was installed on September 8, 2008. In October 2009, Malooly sought Chapter 11 bankruptcy protection for his diocese after obtaining financial settlements with victims of sexual abuse by diocese priests.

Malooly was criticized by some Catholic news outlets for refusing to withhold communion from then U.S. Vice President Joseph Biden due to his position on abortion rights for women. On September 25, 2008, Malooly made this comment on the issue:

...I do not intend to get drawn into partisan politics nor do I intend to politicize the Eucharist as a way of communicating Catholic Church teaching, It is critical to keep the lines of communication open if the church is going to make her teachings understood and, please God, accepted.

On November 9, 2011, Malooly co-authored a statement opposing legislation in the Delaware General Assembly to legalized same sex marriage, calling it a threat to religious freedom.

In 2017, Netflix released the documentary series The Keepers, an investigation into the 1969 murder of Sister Catherine Cesnik in Baltimore. In 1994, Malooly met with Charles Franz and his mother Denise Franz to discuss their allegations of sexual abuse by Joseph Maskell, a diocese priest, against Charles Franz when he was a minor. In that meeting, Denise Franz said that she had reported Maskell to the archdiocese in 1967. The documentary claims that Malooly falsely denied that claim during the meeting. In an official response, Malooly said he told the Franzes that the archdiocese had no record of that 1967 report on Maskell.

The Keepers also charged that the archdiocese, aware of accusations against Maskell, still allowed him to work at Seton Keough Catholic school from 1968 to 1975, where he abused several dozen children In his statement, Malooly said that he first heard allegations against Maskell in 1992, when Malooly was chancellor of the archdiocese. At that time, the archdiocese removed Maskell from ministry, sent him for treatment and started an investigation. He returned to ministry in 1993 after the archdiocese failed to substantiate the charges against him

=== Retirement ===
On Friday, April 30, 2021, Pope Francis accepted Malooly's resignation as bishop of the Diocese of Wilmington, which Malooly had submitted on his 75th Birthday. The pope appointed Monsignor William Koenig as Malooly's successor.

== See also ==
- Catholic Church hierarchy
- Catholic Church in the United States
- Historical list of the Catholic bishops of the United States
- List of Catholic bishops of the United States
- Lists of patriarchs, archbishops, and bishops

== Episcopal succession ==
Catholic Church titles
| Preceded by Michael Angelo Saltarelli | Bishop of Wilmington; 2008–2021 | Succeeded by William Edward Koenig |
| Preceded by – | Auxiliary Bishop of Baltimore; 2000–2008 | Succeeded by – |
