= Bradshaw, Maryland =

Unincorporated community in Maryland, United States

- Unincorporated community
- Location within the State of Maryland Bradshaw, Maryland (the United States)
- Coordinates: 39°25′23″N 76°22′52″W
- Country: United States
- State: Maryland
- County: Baltimore
- Time zone: UTC-5 (Eastern (EST))
  - Summer (DST): UTC-4 (EDT)
- ZIP codes: 21021
- GNIS feature ID: 589800

Bradshaw is an unincorporated community in Baltimore County, Maryland, United States, located southeast of Kingsville.
