= List of churches in the Diocese of Wilmington =

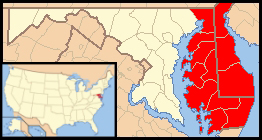
Diocese of Wilmington in red

This is a list of current and former Catholic churches in the Diocese of Wilmington. The diocese covers the entire state of Delaware and the Eastern Shore region of Maryland. The cathedral church of the diocese is the Cathedral of St. Peter in Wilmington, Delaware.

The active parishes in the archdiocese are divided here into deaneries.

== City Deanery ==
This list contains parishes in the City of Wilmington in Delaware.

Name	Image	Location	Description/notes	Organ/piano brand
Downtown Catholic Churches		Cathedral of St. Peter; 500 West St.	Romanesque Revival; cathedral dedicated in 1818	Three manual Austin pipe organ
		St. Mary of the Immaculate Conception Church; 600 E Sixth St.	Church dedicated in 1858; listed on NRHP. Now part of Downtown Catholic Churches	
		St. Patrick Church; 1414 N. King St.	Church dedicated in 1882. Now part of Downtown Catholic Churches	
Sacred Heart		917 N. Madison St.	Founded in 1874, church dedicated in 1883. Lost its parish status in the 1970s and became an oratory.	Three manual Russell Meyer & Associates pipe organ
St. Ann		2013 Gilpin Ave.	Founded in 1868, church dedicated in 1887	
St. Anthony of Padua		901 N. Dupont St.	Church dedicated in 1926, listed on NRHP	
St. Elizabeth		809 S. Broom St	Founded in 1907. church dedicated in 1946	ICS-4000 three manual Peterson pipe organ
St. Hedwig		408 S. Harrison St,	Founded in 1890 for Polish immigrants. Church dedicated in 1905; listed on NRHP	
St. Joseph		1012 French St.	Founded in 1889 as mission for African-Americans, church dedicated in 1947; listed on NRHP	
St. Paul		1010 Ws 4th St,	Founded in 1869	
St. Thomas the Apostle		301 N. Bancroft Pkwy.	Founded in 1904, church dedicated in 1928	

== Brandywine Hundred Deanery ==
This list contains parishes in Wilmington and other communities in northeastern Delaware.

Name	Image	Location	Description/notes	Organ/piano brand
Holy Child		2500 Naamans Rd, Wilmington		Three Manual Allen Digital Computer Organ
Holy Rosary		3200 Philadelphia Pike, Claymont		Two manual Wicks pipe organ
Immaculate Heart of Mary		4701 Weldin Rd, Wilmington		Three manual, digital Classic Master Design Series, Allen organ
St. Helena		602 Philadelphia Pike, Bellefonte	Parish established 1906; current church dedicated 1955	Two manual Reuter pipe organ
St. Joseph on the Brandywine		10 Old Church Rd, Greenville	Founded in the 1830s for DuPont Company workers, church dedicated in 1841	Three manual Allen digital computer organ (two organs)
St. Mary Magdalen		7 Sharpley Rd, Fairfax	Founded in 1951, church dedicated in 1967	Two manual Zimmer pipe organ

== Central New Castle Deanery ==
This list contains parishes in Wilmington, New Castle and other communities in northern Delaware.

Name	Image	Location	Description/notes	Organ/piano brand
Our Lady of Fatima		801 N. Dupont Hwy, New Castle	Founded in 1948, church dedicated in 1965	Three Manual Rodgers Organ
St. Catherine of Siena		2503 Centerville Rd, Wilimington		Two manual Allen digital computer organ
St. John the Beloved		907 Milltown Rd, Wilmington	Founded in the 1950s, church dedicated in 1976	Two Manual Allen Digital Computer Organ
St. Mary of the Assumption		7200 Lancaster Pike, Hockessin	Parish founded in the 1960s, with roots going back to the 1790s. Church dedicated in 1965	Three manual digital Classic Renaissance Allen organ
St. Matthew/Corpus Christi Catholic Churches		St. Matthew Church, 901 E. Newport Pike, Woodcrest	Merged with Corpus Christi Parish	Two Manual Rodgers Organ
		Corpus Christi Church, 903 New Rd. Elsmere	Merged with St. Matthew Parish	Two manual Allen digital computer organ
St. Paul		209 Washington St, Delaware City	Founded in 1883 with roots to 1856. Church dedicated in 1905. Parish also hosts Korean Catholic Community.	Two manual Yamaha Organ
Holy Spirit and St. Peter the Apostle Parish		St. Peter the Apostle Church, 521 Harmony St, New Castle	Founded in early 1800s, church dedicated in 1876. Merged with Holy Spirit Parish in 2016.	Two manual tracker pipe organ
		Holy Spirit Church, 12 Winder Rd, New Castle	Merged with St. Peter the Apostle Parish in 2016	Two manual Allen digital computer organ

== Eastern Shore Deanery ==
This list contains parishes and mission churches in Maryland on Chesapeake Bay.

Name	Image	Location	Description/notes	Organ/piano brand
Our Mother of Sorrows		301 Chesterfield Ave, Centreville	Founded in 1880s, church dedicated in 1932	
		St. Peter Mission Church, 5319 Ocean Gateway, Queenstown	Founded in 1765, church dedicated in 1827. Listed on NRHP; supervised by Our Mother of Sorrows Parish	
Sacred Heart		508 High St, Chestertown		
St. Benedict / St. Elizabeth Catholic Community		St. Benedict Church, 408 Central Ave, Ridgely	Church dedicated in 1896. Now merged with St. Elizabeth of Hungary Parish	
		St. Elizabeth of Hungary Church, 108 1st St, Denton	Founded in 1820s, church dedicated around 1831, now merged with St. Benedict Parish	Kawai Piano
St. Christopher		1861 Harbor Dr, Chester	Founded in 1952, church dedicated in 2009	
St. Francis de Sales		535 Riverside Dr, Salisbury	Founded in 1910, church dedicated in 1964	Three manual Digital Classic Renaissance QUANTUM Allen organ
		Holy Redeemer Mission Church, Bi-State Blvd at Chestnut St, Delmar	Supervised by St. Francis de Sales Parish	Two manual Digital Classic Protege Allen organ
St. Mary - Refuge of Sinners and Star of the Sea		1515 Glasgow St, Cambridge	St. Mary Refuge founded in 1840s, church dedicated in 1974. St. Mary Star founded in 1760, church dedicated in 1872	
Ss. Peter and Paul		7906 Ocean Gateway, Easton	Founded in 1860s, church dedicated in 2005	Three manual Rodgers Pipe organ
		St. Michael Mission Church, 109 Lincoln Ave, St. Michaels	Founded in 1670s, chapel dedicated in 1969. Supervised by Ss. Peter and Paul Parish	Three manual Rodgers organ

== Iron Hill Deanery ==
This list contains parishes in Newark and other communities in both Maryland and Delaware.

Name	Image	Location	Description/notes	Organ/piano brand
Good Shepherd Parish		Good Shepherd Church, 800 Aiken Ave, Perryville, Maryland		
		St. Patrick Mission Church, 287 Pleasant Grove Rd, Conowingo	Supervised by Good Shepherd Parish	
		St. Agnes Church, 150 S. Queen St, Rising Sun	Merged with Good Shepherd Parish	
Holy Family		15 Gender Rd, Newark, Delaware	Founded in 1979	Two manual Rodgers organ
Immaculate Conception		454 Bow St, Elkton, Maryland	Founded as mission in 1808, dedicated in 1973	
		St. Jude Church, Turkey Point Rd, Rt. 272, North East	Church constructed in 1969, supervised by Immaculate Conception Parish	Two manual Roland Classic organ
Resurrection		3000 Videre Dr, Wilmington	Founded in 1969, church dedicated in 1996	
St. Elizabeth Ann Seton		345 Bear-Christiana Rd, Bear, Delaware	Founded in 1978, church dedicated in 1980	Three manual Digital Classic Allen Genisys organ
St. John the Baptist / Holy Angels Parish		St. John the Baptist Church, 200 E. Main Street, Newark	Founded as mission in 1868, became parish in 1891, church dedicated in 1971. Merged with Holy Angels Parish	
		Holy Angels Church, 82 Possum Park Rd, Newark	Church dedicated in 2004. Merged with St. John the Baptist Parish	Two manual Allen digital computer organ
St. Joseph		371 E. Main St, Middletown, Delaware	Founded in 1880s, church dedicated in 2007	Three manual Digital Classic Renaissance Allen organ
St. Margaret of Scotland		2431 Frazer Rd, Newark	Founded in 1999, church dedicated in 2007	Two manual Rodgers organ
St. Thomas More Oratory		45 Lovett Ave, Newark	Newman Center at the University of Delaware, founded as personal parish in 1976	

== Silver Lake Deanery ==
This list contains parishes in both Delaware and Maryland, most of them close to Delaware Bay.

Name	Image	Location	Description/notes	Organ/piano brand
Holy Cross		631 S. State St, Dover, Delaware	Founded in 1870, it is the oldest parish in central or southern Delaware. The Church moved from Bradford St in Dover, to State Street in Dover in the 1950s. The new Church building was built and dedicated in 1997. In 2013, Holy Cross Parish was linked (twinned) with Immaculate Conception Parish in Marydel, Maryland.	Three manual Rodgers organ
Immaculate Conception		522 Main St, Marydel, Maryland	Founded in 1914, it was originally a mission of St. Benedict in Ridgly, Maryland. The Church building was dedicated and had its first Mass at Midnight Mass on Christmas of 1918. In 2013, it was linked (twinned) with Holy Cross Parish, in Dover, Delaware.	
St. John the Apostle		506 Seabury Ave, Milford, Delaware	Founded in early 1900s, church dedicated in 1952	Two manual Allen digital computer organ
		St. Bernadette Mission Church, 109 Dixon St, Harrington, Delaware	Founded in 1912, church dedicated in 1953. St. Bernadette is a mission of St. John the Apostle Parish, in Milford, Delaware.	Two manual Allen digital computer organ
St. Dennis		153 N. Main St, Galena, Maryland		
St. Polycarp		135 Ransom Lane, Smyrna, Delaware	Founded in 1880s, church dedicated in 1968	Two manual Allen digital computer organ

== Ocean Deanery ==
This list contains parishes and mission churches in Maryland and Delaware, with most of them on the Atlantic Seaboard.

Name	Image	Location	Description/notes	Organ/piano brand
Holy Name of Jesus		1913 Old Virginia Rd, Pocomoke City, Maryland		Two Manual Conn Electronic Organ
		St. Elizabeth Mission Church, Old Westover Rd, Westover	Supervised by Holy Name of Jesus Parish	Two manual Roland Classic organ
Our Lady of Lourdes		532 Stein Hwy, Seaford, Delaware	Founded in 1945	Yamaha Keyboard
St. Ann		691 Garfield Pkwy, Bethany Beach, Delaware	Founded as mission in 1955, became parish in 1972 and church dedicated that same year.	Two manual Allen digital computer organ
		Our Lady of Guadalupe Mission Church, 35318 Church Rd, Frankford		Kawai Piano
St. Edmond		409 King Charles Ave, Rehoboth Beach, Delaware	Founded in early 1900s, church dedicated in 1940	Two manual Allen digital computer organ
St. John Neumann		11211 Beauchamp Rd, Berlin, Maryland		Two Manual Allen Digital Computer Organ
St. Jude The Apostle		152 Tulip Dr, Lewes, Delaware	Founded in 1959 as a mission church, became parish in 2002, church dedicated in the 1960s	Three manual Rodgers Allegiant Organ
St. Luke		9903 Coastal Hwy, Ocean City, Maryland	Founded in 1985	Two Manual Digital Classic Renaissance QUANTUM Allen Organ
St. Mary Star of the Sea / Holy Savior		200 S. Baltimore Ave, Ocean City		Two Manual M.P. Moller Pipe Organ/Two Manual Digital Classic Renaissance Allen Organ
St. Michael the Archangel /Mary Mother of Peach Parish		St. Michael the Archangel Church, 202 Edward St, Georgetown, Delaware	Founded in 1956, merged with Mary, Mother of Peace Parish in 1986	Yamaha grand piano
		Mary, Mother of Peace Church, Routes 24 and 5 Oak Orchard, Millsboro, Delaware	Merged with St. Michael the Archangel in 1986	Two manual Digital Classic Renaissance Allen organ

== Historic buildings ==
Name	Image	Location	Description/notes
St. Francis Xavier Shrine (Old Bohemia)		1445 Bohemia Church Rd, Warwick	First church dedicated in 1804, church closed in 1929. Now maintained by an historic society.
St. Stanislaus Kostka		901 E, 7th St, Wilmington	Founded in 1912 for Polish immigrants, church dedicated in 1913, closed in 2009
