= Joseph Richey =

Anglo-Irish priest of Episcopal Church

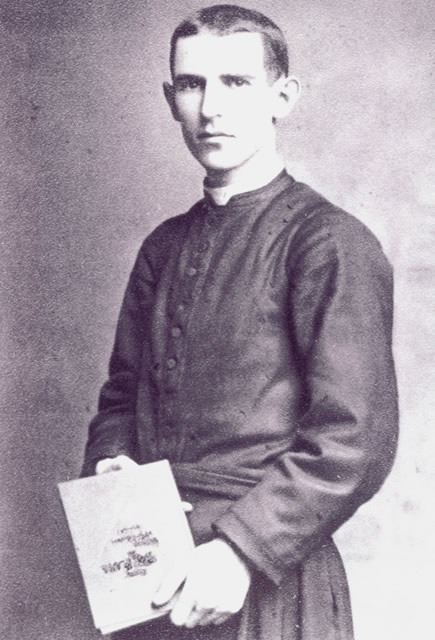
- Born: October 5, 1843; Newry, Ireland
- Died: September 21, 1877; Marylebone, London
- Venerated in: Episcopal Diocese of Maryland
- Feast: September 23

Joseph Richey (October 5, 1843 – September 21, 1877) was an Anglo-Irish priest of Episcopal Church in the United States. He was known for his work among the African-American community of Baltimore and for his high church Anglicanism. His feast day, September 23, is included in the Lesser Feasts and Fasts of the Episcopal Diocese of Maryland.

== Early life ==
Joseph Richey was born in the town of Newry, County Down, in Ireland, although other sources give Belfast as his place of birth. He emigrated with members of his family to the United States when he was ten years old, originally staying in Butler, Pennsylvania. Richey eventually decided to become an Anglican priest, and so at age 16 he headed to Baltimore, where his older brother Thomas Richey, who would eventually go on to become the second president of Bard College, was then serving as rector of Mount Calvary Church. Joseph obtained his Bachelor of Arts degree from Trinity College (Connecticut), where at commencement exercises he addressed his fellow students, the graduating class of 1866, on the topic of "The Vicissitudes of a Nation's Literature". From there, Richey attended the General Theological Seminary in New York.

== Ministry ==
Richey was ordained as a deacon on May 23, 1869, at the Church of the Transfiguration in New York by Bishop Horatio Potter and on September 17 of that year was received into the Episcopal Diocese of Albany. Richey was ordained priest on December 18, 1869, by William Croswell Doane, bishop of the Episcopal Diocese of Albany, and a day later was installed as rector of the congregation that is now St. John's, Delhi in that diocese. Bishop Doane later described Richey as “the best theologian he knew”. Soon after, Richey became one of the clergy of the Church of the Advent in Boston, of which the rector, Charles Chapman Grafton, was a co-founder of the Society of St. John the Evangelist, a high-church Anglican religious order also known as the Cowley Fathers.

In 1872, Alfred Allen Paul Curtis resigned his position as rector of Mount Calvary Church in Baltimore so that he might enter the Roman Catholic Church. Bishop William Rollinson Whittingham, the bishop of the Episcopal Diocese of Maryland and whose family parish Mount Calvary was, asked Richey to become rector. Richey accepted, and thus became the seventh rector of Mount Calvary, on the condition that he should be accompanied by his friend from seminary days, the "zealous ritualist" Rev. Calbraith Bourn Perry. That same year, Richey invited the All Saints Sisters of the Poor to send members from England to help in the work of his church. Mother Harriet Brownlow Byron, their superior, dispatched Sisters Helen, Serena, and Winifred to Baltimore to establish a community and "to do Mission work in Mount Calvary parish." Richey helped found a daughter church for Baltimore's African-American community, Saint Mary the Virgin, which was established in 1873. Eight years later, it was the largest African-American Episcopalian parish in the country and "became the church of Baltimore's aristocrats of color." Richey, together with the parishioners of Mount Calvary and the All Saints Sisters, also founded the All Saints School (described as "the darling wish of his heart") and another mission parish for the African American community, Chapel of the Epiphany for he was "very energetic in church work." The work done by Richey and Perry with the African American poor of Baltimore was reported in a book by Perry, Twelve Years Among the Colored People, a Record of the Work of Mount Calvary Chapel of S. Mary the Virgin, Baltimore.

== Death ==
Richey was in poor health and on the advice of his physician, Samuel C. Chew, set out for Europe, hoping the "change in air" would provide a cure. The ship sailed from New York on July 26, 1877. He reached London on the evening of September 17, 1877. Three days later, he met with his friend, Father Richard Meux Benson, another co-founder of the Society of St. John the Evangelist. The Rev. Arthur Brinckman, chaplain to the All Saints Sisters, was with him until two in the morning; but Richey died at 5:00 on the morning of September 21, the cause of death being pulmonary disease. His body was returned to Baltimore and a burial service was held at Mount Calvary Church on October 18, 1887. The Baltimore Sun reported that a great crowd attended the service and lined the streets; Richey was buried at St. John's Episcopal Cemetery, close to the grave of Mother Harriet.

== Controversies ==
In a memorial service of October 21, Rev. William F. Brand asserted of Richey that "A mere man of books he was not; but having entered on the duties of clerical life with a better preparation through the use of books than do the greater number of our clergy, he took care to keep his mind in due exercise as a scholar... In conveying to others the result of study, or in persuasion, he was not a brilliant orator; but in speech he was easy and self-possessed, and he gave an impression not only of the sincerity of his convictions, but also of the exactness of his knowledge."

Richey believed in the doctrine of the Real Presence and heard confessions, both of which were controversial in the Episcopal church at that time. Richey and Perry were sent before Bishop William Rollinson Whittingham on February 4 and 5, 1875, for "violation of their ordination vows and of the articles of religion" for offering prayers for the dead. Bishop Whittingham objected to Richey's use of altar lights, wafer bread, elevating the Host, making the sign of the cross, and praying for the dead. Bishop Whittingham was subsequently charged by two clergymen and five laymen of the diocese with neglect of duty for failing to admonish Perry and Richey. A board of inquiry found that there was insufficient grounds to proceed further, but made a "unanimous and emphatic condemnation of the alleged teachings of Rev. Messrs. Calbraith Perry and Joseph Richey. Prayers for the dead had been removed from the 1552 edition of the Book of Common Prayer as connected to the "Romish invention" of purgatory, until in the aftermath of World War I it was revived in some areas as an element of pastoral care.

== Acclaim ==
In spite of theological controversies, Richey's great devotion to the priesthood and to ministry was acclaimed by many. William Francis Brand said "Your clergy will tell you that, while prompt to spare them, he never spared himself. I myself have seen him later than two o'clock taking his first morsel of food after constant labour from six in the morning,—a labour so wearying to the body through the spirit; and this at a time when the disease which cut short his days gave him little rest in sleep. And yet his complaint was that he neglected duties." Elsewhere he wrote of Richey as a man of "a lovely spirit, holy, self-sacrificing, full of labors." His former assistant rector at Mount Calvary, Calbourn Perry, wrote "He drew to himself devoted friends and ardent admirers. His enthusiasm, his brilliant intellect, the positiveness of his convictions, were singularly blended with a woman's tenderness and sympathy. Men who widely differed from him respected him, and those who had keenly felt his reproofs, loved him."

A letter published in England's newspaper The Guardian describes him as "a brave American priest... he has left behind him as his monument in the history of the American church his devoted labors in Baltimore, his saintly life, his wonderful success in building up the spiritual fabric of the Church of Mount Calvary, and the many valuable agencies he has inaugurated... how many tears and prayers will go up before God for His brave soldier and servant, the young and crowned priest." Hall Harrison, in his biography of Bishop John Barrett Kerfoot, said that Richey "so well known and so justly beloved in Maryland as rector of Mount Calvary Church, Baltimore, was himself of a frank, ingenuous nature, full of burning zeal, firm in his convictions, and fearless and outspoken in maintaining them."

In 1987, the All Saints Sisters and the Mount Calvary Church jointly founded a hospice, which was named the Joseph Richey House in his honor. In 2004, Richey was added to the calendar of Lesser Feasts and Fasts of the Episcopal Diocese of Maryland, with a feast day of September 23.
