= 1818 in architecture =

The year 1818 in architecture involved some significant events.

== Events ==
- Church Building Act in the United Kingdom makes available £1 million for the construction of new Anglican "Commissioners' churches" to serve the expanding urban population.

== Buildings and structures ==
=== Buildings ===
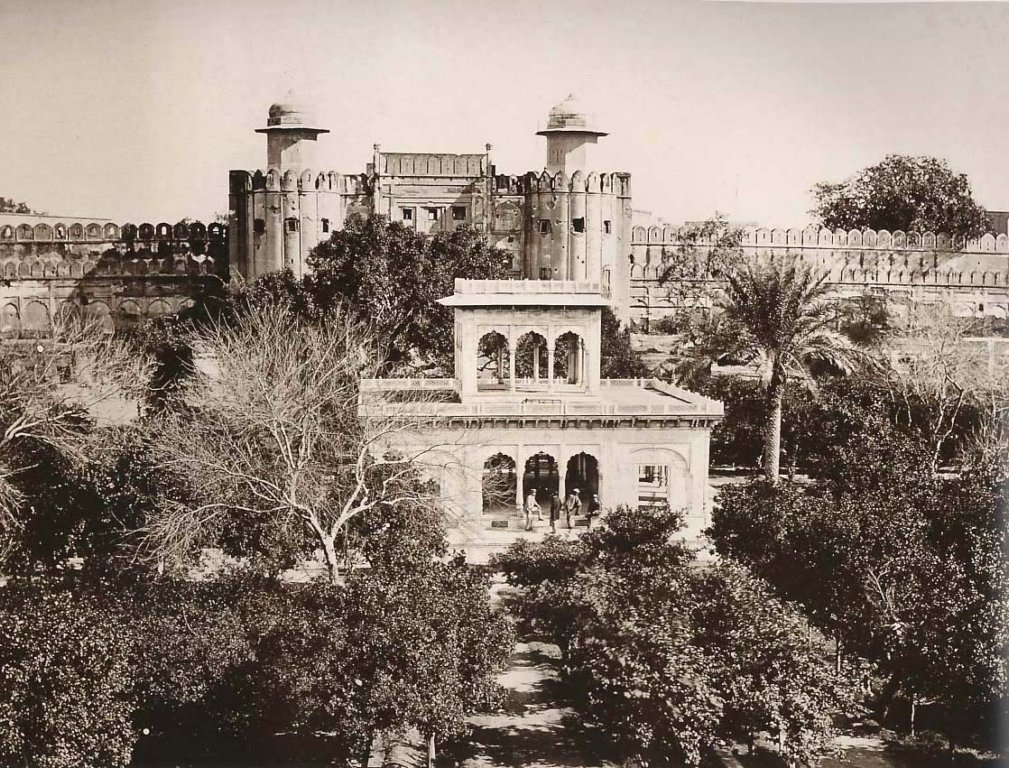
Hazuri Bagh Baradari, Lahore in original condition (centre)

- Hazuri Bagh Baradari, Lahore, Punjab, built.
- Chapel of St John the Evangelist, Edinburgh, Scotland, designed by William Burn, dedicated.
- Church of Saint Peter, Wilmington, Delaware, designed by Pierre Bauduy, dedicated
- Trinity House of Leith, Scotland, designed by Thomas Brown, completed.
- The Holme in Regent's Park, London, built by Decimus Burton as a house for his father James Burton.
- "Ware's Folly" in Augusta, Georgia, United States, completed as a house for Nicholas Ware at enormous cost.
- First National Theatre Munich, Bavaria, designed by Karl von Fischer, opened.
- The Royal Coburg Theatre, London, opened.
- The Savannah Theatre, Savannah, Georgia, United States, designed by William Jay, opened.
- Teatro Nuovo, Pesaro, Papal States of Italy, opened as an opera house.
- Whitworth Bridge, Dublin, Ireland, designed by George Knowles, opened.

== Awards ==
- Grand Prix de Rome, architecture: no first prize awarded.

== Births ==
- May 17 – William Hay, Scottish architect (died 1888)
- June 20 – Eugenius Birch, English civil engineer specialising in seaside pleasure piers (died 1884)
- July 22 – Thomas Stevenson, Scottish civil engineer specialising in lighthouses (died 1887)
- November 11 – James Renwick Jr., American architect (died 1895)
- Thomas Mainwaring Penson, English architect (died 1864)
- Louis-Daniel Perrier, Swiss architect (died 1903)

== Deaths ==
- April 25 – Johan Martin Quist, Danish architect (born 1755)
- May 1 – François-Joseph Bélanger, French neoclassical architect (born 1744)
