= Saint Stanislaus Kostka Church =

Saint Stanislaus Kostka Church may refer to:

- St. Stanislaus Kostka Church (Warsaw), or the Sanctuary of Blessed Jerzy Popiełuszko
- St. Stanislaus Kostka Church (Rochester, New York)
- St. Stanislaus Kostka Church (Chicago)
- St. Stanislaus Kostka Church (Pittsburgh), listed on the NRHP in Pennsylvania
- St. Stanislaus Kostka Church (St. Louis, Missouri), listed on the NRHP in Missouri
- St. Stanislaus Kostka Church (Wilmington, Delaware) in Wilmington, Delaware
- St. Stanislaus Kostka Parish, Waterbury, designated for Polish immigrants in Waterbury, Connecticut
- St. Stanislaus Kostka Parish, Woonsocket, designated for Polish immigrants in Woonsocket, Rhode Island
- St. Stanislaus Kostka Mission, Rathdrum, Idaho, listed on the NRHP in Idaho
- St. Stanislaus Kostka Roman Catholic Church (Maspeth), Maspeth, Queens, New York
