= Alfred Allen Paul Curtis =

American prelate

His Excellency, The Right Reverend Alfred Allen Paul Curtis
- Bishop of Wilmington
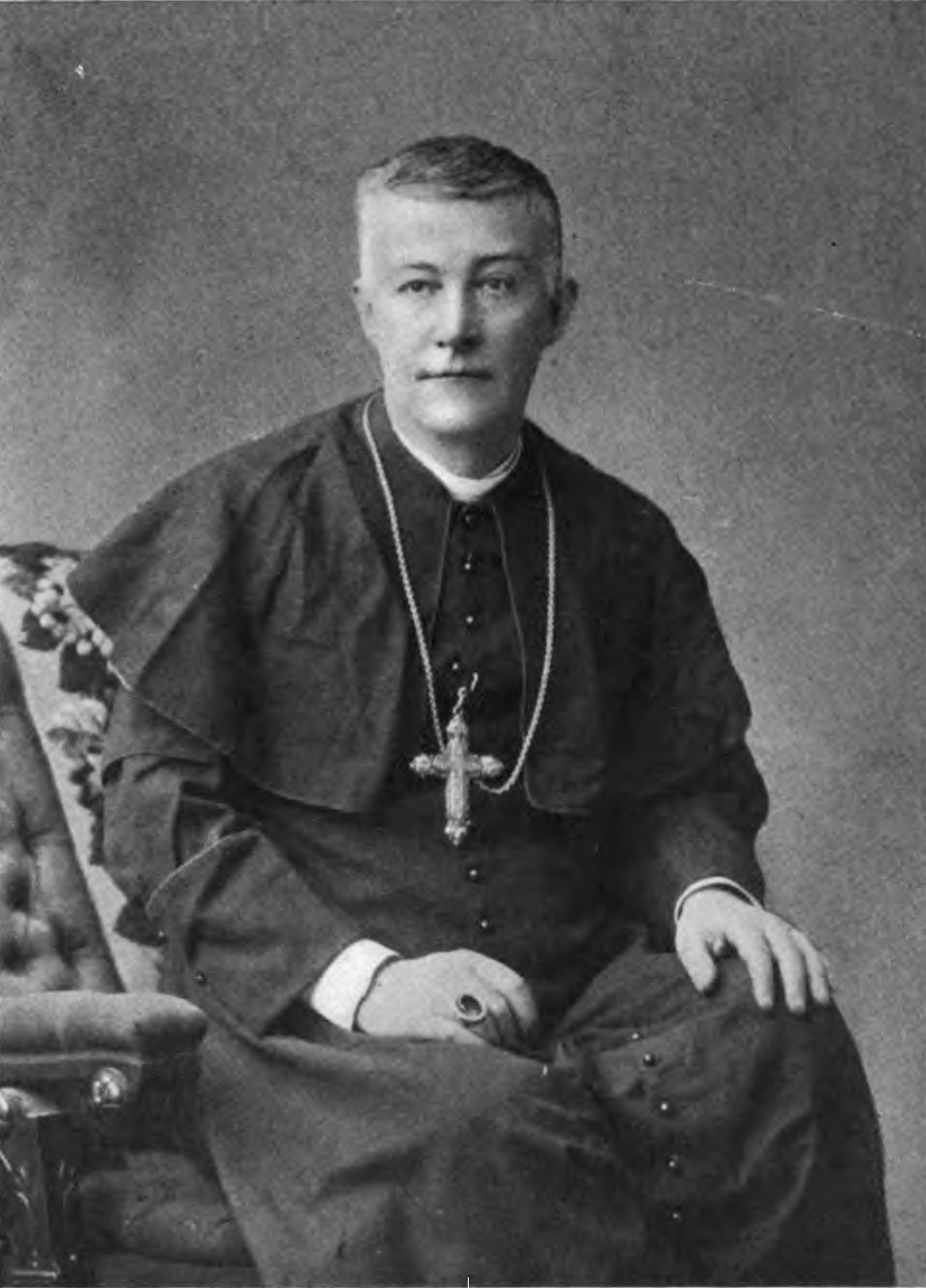
- See: Diocese of Wilmington
- Installed: November 25, 1886
- Term ended: May 23, 1896
- Predecessor: Thomas Becker
- Successor: John Monaghan
- Other posts: Titular Bishop of Echinus (1896–1908); Auxiliary Bishop of Baltimore (1897–1908)

Orders
- Ordination: December 19, 1874 by James Roosevelt Bayley
- Consecration: November 14, 1886 by James Gibbons

Personal details
- Born: July 4, 1831 Rehobeth, Maryland, USA
- Died: July 11, 1908 (aged 77) Baltimore, Maryland, USA
- Denomination: Roman Catholic Church
- Education: St. Charles Seminary; St. Mary's Seminary
- Motto: Alma virgo mater, ora pro nobis (Gracious Virgin Mother, pray for us)

Styles of Alfred Allen Paul Curtis
- Reference style: His Excellency; The Most Reverend
- Spoken style: Your Excellency
- Religious style: Archbishop

Alfred Allen Paul Curtis (July 4, 1831 – July 11, 1908) was an American prelate of the Roman Catholic Church. He served as bishop of the Diocese of Wilmington in Delaware (1886–1896) and as an auxiliary bishop of the Archdiocese of Baltimore in Maryland (1897–1908). Curtis had served as an Episcopal priest for 12 years before converting to Catholicism.

== Biography ==
=== Early life ===
Alfred Curtis was born on July 4, 1831, near Rehobeth, Maryland, to Episcopalian parents. He attended the country school his father had founded, but taught himself Latin, Greek, and the works of Shakespeare. Following his father's death in 1849, the family moved to Pocomoke City, Maryland. Curtis took a job as an assistant teacher at an academy in Princess Anne, Maryland, to support the family. Curtis began studying for the ministry in 1855. After an examination before Episcopalian ministers in Berlin, Maryland, he was ordained a deacon in 1856.

=== Priesthood ===
==== Episcopalian priest ====
Curtis was ordained as an Episcopal priest in 1859. He then worked as an assistant at St. Luke's Church in Baltimore. Curtis was later transferred to Frederick County and then to Chestertown, Kent County. In 1862, Curtis was elected rector of Mount Calvary Church in Baltimore. Curtis adopted an ascetic lifestyle, sleeping on the floor of his residence and fasting for several days on end. He spent time studying with a rabbi in Baltimore and studying documents of the early Christian Church,.

As Curtis began edging towards Catholic practices, some of his congregation complained to Episcopalian Bishop William Whittingham, accusing Curtis of being a "Roman priest". Curtis denied the accusation. During the American Civil War of the early 1860s, Curtis seemed to favor the victory of the Confederate States of America. He wrote that Union Army victories were “steps and stages towards eventual ruin” and that they were “matters of humiliation and not of thanksgiving.” Whittingham reacted to Curtis's statements by giving up his pew at Mount Calvary, saying that he did not wish to be “associated with a body so treasonably ungrateful for Divine Mercy shown in the deliverance of the State from armed rebels and thieves.”

Curtis gradually became more Catholic in his beliefs and practices. A final dispute with Whittingham over his pastoral letter on the eucharist prompted Curtis to resign as rector of Mount Calvary in 1871. In March 1872, Curtis traveled to England to meet in Oxford with Reverend John Henry Newman, himself a former Anglican. Curtis was received into the Catholic Church by Newman on May 18, 1872. Curtis returned to Baltimore later that year, entering St. Charles Seminary in Ellicott City, Maryland. At age 46, he entered St. Mary's Seminary in Baltimore.

==== Catholic priest ====
Curtis was ordained a Catholic priest in Baltimore by Archbishop James Bayley for the Archdiocese of Baltimore on December 19, 1874. He then served as Bayley's private secretary and as an assistant rector at the Cathedral of Assumption of the Blessed Virgin Mary in Baltimore. According to contemporary accounts, Curtis was kind to the elderly, the sick, and those in trouble. He treated African-Americans with respect, at one time offering his own cushion during confession to an older African-American woman. Curtis enjoyed teaching catechism to the children. An accomplished sailor, Curtis enjoyed taking his yawl on long trips down Chesapeake Bay and swimming in the ocean. In 1883, Curtis accompanied Bishop James Gibbons on a trip to Rome.

=== Bishop of Wilmington ===
On August 3, 1886, Curtis was appointed the second bishop of Wilmington by Pope Leo XIII. Despite his many reservations about the appointment, Curtis accepted it. He received his episcopal consecration at the Cathedral of Assumption of the Blessed Virgin Mary on November 14, 1886, from Gibbons, with Bishops John Moore and John Kain serving as co-consecrators. He was installed at St. Peter's Cathedral in Wilmington, Delaware, on November 21, 1886.

During his tenure as bishop, Curtis introduced the Josephite Fathers into the diocese to minister to African American Catholics. Curtis also built St. Joseph Church in Wilmington, an orphanage, and a parochial school, segregated facilities for the African-American congregation. He also erected a cloistered convent for the sisters of the Order of the Visitation of Holy Mary. Twice a year, Curtis would visit the county almshouse to minister to the poor and bring them food. When he took office, Curtis discovered that all the church property in the diocese was under the personal name of the bishop. He spent the next few years filing legal transfers of all the property to the diocese itself. He also led efforts to clear the sizable debt owed by the diocese and its parishes.

In his personal life, Curtis ate small meals of vegetables and fruits with little meat. He wore a hairshirt and chains under his clothing and flagellated himself in his room.Leo XIII accepted Curtis's resignation as bishop of Wilmington due to poor health on May 23, 1896, and appointed him as titular bishop of Echinus. Curtis left the diocese with 25,000 Catholics, 30 priests, 22 churches and 18 missions, 12 seminarians, eight religious communities, three academies, nine parochial schools, and three orphanages.

=== Auxiliary Bishop of Baltimore ===
After Curtis's health improved, Leo XIII appointed him as an auxiliary bishop of Baltimore in 1897. He assisted Gibbons with ordinations and confirmations.

=== Death ===
Alfred Curtis died from cancer at St. Agnes Hospital in Baltimore on July 11, 1908, at age 77. At his own request, his remains were buried at Visitation Monastery in Wilmington. In 1993, because of the Visitation community's relocation to Massachusetts, Curtis's remains were moved to Cathedral Cemetery in Baltimore.

== See also ==
- Catholic Church hierarchy
- Catholic Church in the United States
- Historical list of the Catholic bishops of the United States
- List of Catholic bishops of the United States
- Lists of patriarchs, archbishops, and bishops

== Episcopal succession ==
Catholic Church titles
Preceded by Thomas Albert Andrew Becker	Bishop of Wilmington; 1886—1896	Succeeded by John James Joseph Monaghan
