= St. Stanislaus Kostka Church (Wilmington, Delaware) =

Catholic church in Delaware, US, 1913–2009

Coordinates: 34.341833°N 77.906380°W

St. Stanislaus Kostka Church in Wilmington, Delaware, United States, was founded November 23, 1913, as a Roman Catholic Church on the East Side of Wilmington to serve the needs of a growing Polish immigrant community. The Church was a part of the Diocese of Wilmington, until its closure on February 15, 2009.

== History ==
During the late years of the nineteenth century and early twentieth century, many Polish immigrants came to America seeking a better future and way of life. They brought with them their religion, as well as many customs and traditions. Many settled in Wilmington during this time, particularly on the West Side of Wilmington in the Hedgeville/Browntown area. They worked together and formed St. Hedwig's Parish in the late eighteen hundreds, with the supervision and guidance of Monsignor John S. Gulcz, who was born in Poznan, Poland, and arrived in Delaware in 1896 to serve the Polish community.

As time went on, the Polish population began to expand into the East Side of Wilmington, attracted by the shipbuilding and leather works industries. The immigrants faced the problem of not being able to send their children all the way across town to St. Hedwig's parish school. Faced with the problem of establishing a home and raising their children, they had little money. Most troubling of all, they could not worship in their native tongue. The immigrants requested Monsignor Gulcz to establish a new parish on the East Side of Wilmington where they could worship closer to their homes.

On November 8, 1912, Monsignor Gulcz obtained permission from Bishop John James Joseph Monaghan to build a new Polish parish on the East Side of Wilmington. In the time before the new church could be built, the Polish immigrants attended Mass and liturgical services in the basement of St. Mary of the Immaculate Conception Church at 6th and Pine streets, which was consecrated by St. John Neumann. The new church was officially completed and consecrated, with the cornerstone laid on November 23, 1913. Former parishioners and pictures indicated that the event attracted over 1200 people and stretched from the end of East 7th and Church Streets all the way to the railroad bridge adjacent to the Church. Searching through the history of the parish, there was no special grant of any large sum of money or donations made in order to build the Church. Money had to be collected in small increments and for the most part the parishioners built the church themselves with their own talents, time, and resources.

The first pastor, Rev. John Supinski, was appointed in October 1912, but only stayed about fifteen days. The church was originally called "Holy Spirit", but during Supinski's brief tenure it was renamed at the request of the parishioners "St. Stanislaus Kostka". The parochial school was staffed by the Felician Sisters. It closed in 1972. The parish, throughout its many years, was credited with inspiring many religious vocations.

The parish remained active for about ninety-seven years and was an integral part of the Diocese of Wilmington. St. Stanislaus was instrumental in preserving many of the traditional Polish religious customs: Corpus Christi, the blessing of flowers on the Feast of the Assumption, Gorzkie żale, the blessing of food at Easter (Swieconka), and many others. The parish organized many fund-raising events, had weekly bingo games for many years, Polka dances, food festivals, and established internal Catholic societies for religious devotions including the Holy Rosary and Holy Name Societies. Mayor John E. Babiarz Sr., a lifelong parishioner, went on to become Wilmington's mayor in 1960s.

Eventually many of the parishioners migrated to the suburbs. Due to the reduced number of parishioners and a decline in the number of available priests, the parish of St. Stanislaus Kostka closed on February 15, 2009. A final closing Mass was celebrated by Bishop Michael Angelo Saltarelli. More than 500 people attended, including many former parishioners and school students.

A list of the past Pastors (Priests) of St. Stanislaus Kostka Church, in chronological order:

- John Supinski
- Szymon Nawrocki
- Anthoni C. Oleksinski
- Sylvester Hosinski
- Stanley Delikat
- Alex Gorski
- Francis Szperka
- Edward Kaczorowski

== Today ==
Many of St. Stanislaus' former parishioners now attend St. Hedwig Church in Wilmington, located on the corner of Linden and South Harrison Streets. A special remembrance Mass on November 24, 2013, was celebrated by Fr. Christopher Coffiey, who grew up in St. Stanislaus parish.

A great number of the religious articles and objects in the church were distributed to various churches in the Diocese. The marble crucifix and marble side altar from St. Stanislaus Kostka went to St. Polycarp's in Smyrna. Additionally, the main marble altar from the closed church was placed in St. Mary Magdalene Church in Sharpley, DE.

The present church building, which was deconsecrated, adjacent school, hall, and convent remain on the block East 7th, 8th, Locust and Buttonwood Streets in Wilmington, Delaware. These facilities no longer belong to the Catholic Church, and are now owned by the Protestant Highway Word of Faith Church.
