= St. Mary's School (Wilmington, Delaware) =

- U.S. National Register of Historic Places
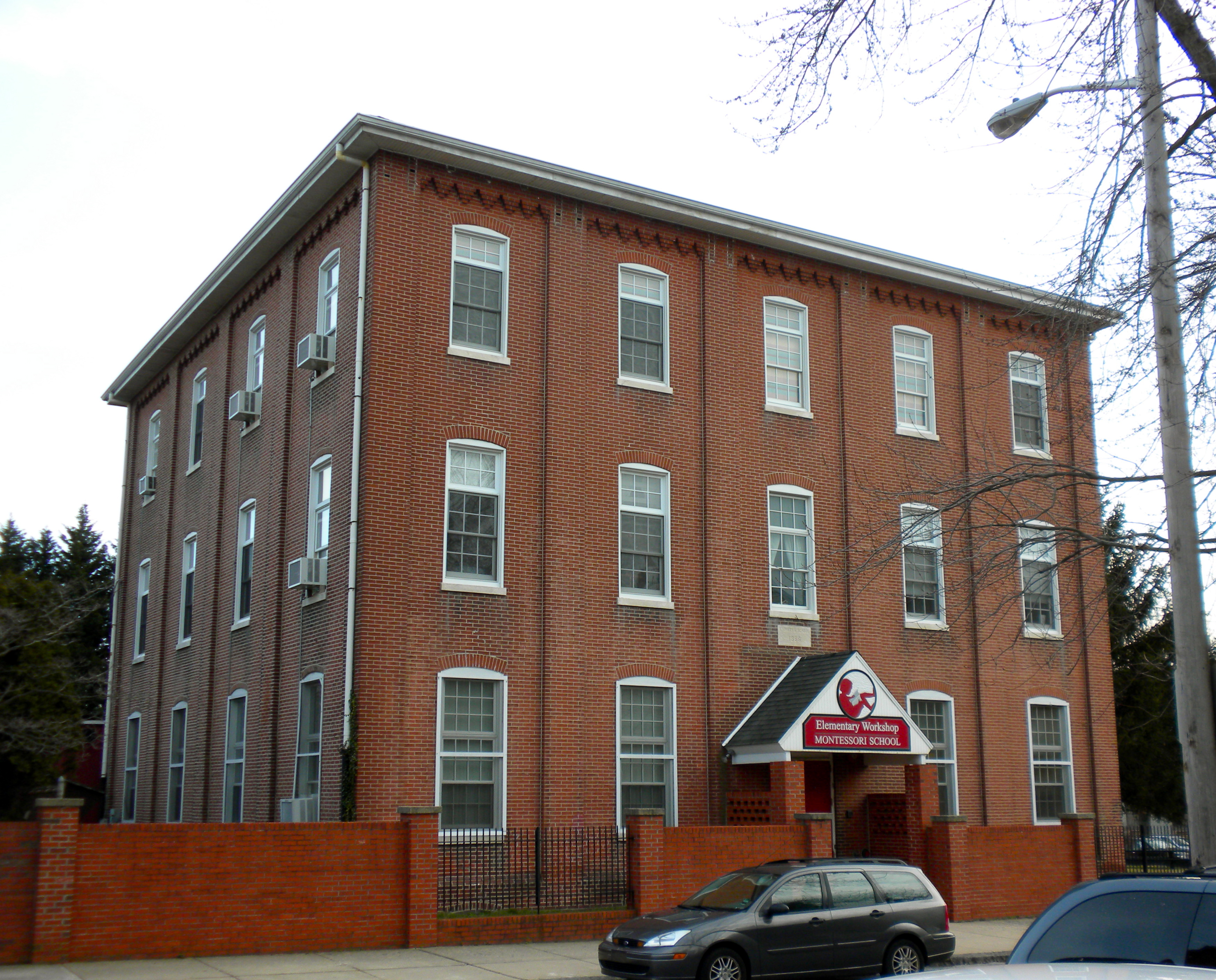

- Location within Delaware Location within the United States
- Location: 502 Pine St., Wilmington, Delaware
- Coordinates: 39.738824°N 75.544217°W
- Area: less than one acre
- Built: 1866
- Architectural style: Italianate
- NRHP reference No.: 83001339
- Added to NRHP: January 5, 1983

St. Mary's School is a historic Roman Catholic school building in Wilmington, New Castle County, Delaware. It was built in 1866 to serve children of parishioners of the adjacent St. Mary of the Immaculate Conception Church. It housed a parochial school until 1979, after which it was occupied by the Elementary Workshop Montessori School until 2014. Then it housed Pine Street Learning Academy, a Pre-School and Early Childhood Education Center. It is a three-story, five bay by four bay, brick structure with a low hipped roof in the Italianate style. It features a wooden box cornice around the entire roof line.

It added to the National Register of Historic Places in 1983.
