= Mount Calvary Church =

Catholic ordinariate Church in Baltimore, Maryland

Mount Calvary Church, Baltimore
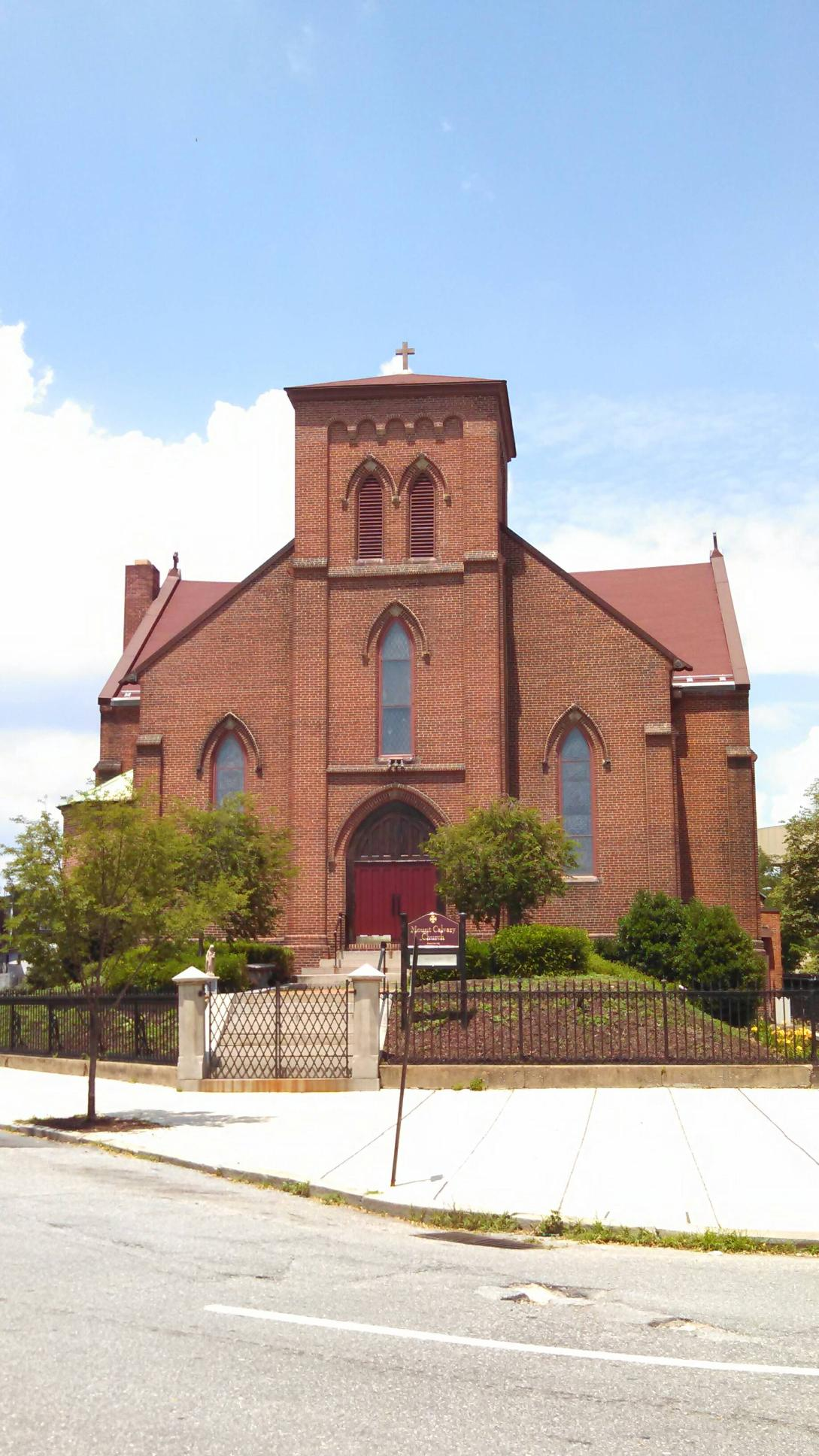
- Mount Calvary Church, Baltimore
- 39°17′57″N 76°37′18″W
- Location: 816 N Eutaw St, Baltimore, Maryland, 21201
- Country: United States
- Denomination: Catholic Church
- Previous denomination: Episcopal Church
- Sui iuris church: Anglican Use
- Website: www.mountcalvary.com

History
- Status: Personal parish

Architecture
- Functional status: Active
- Architects: Robert Cary Long, Jr.; T. Buckler Ghequier
- Architectural type: Gothic
- Groundbreaking: September 10, 1844; 182 years ago
- Completed: February 19, 1846; 180 years ago

Administration
- Diocese: Personal Ordinariate of the Chair of Saint Peter

Clergy
- Bishop: Steven J. Lopes
- Priest: Albert Scharbach

Mount Calvary Church is a Catholic parish located in the Seton Hill neighborhood of Baltimore, Maryland. The church was founded in 1842 as a mission congregation within the Episcopal Church and is now a community within the Personal Ordinariate of the Chair of Saint Peter of the Roman Catholic Church.

== Architecture ==
The building was designed by the architect Robert Cary Long Jr. in 1844 and the cornerstone was laid on Tuesday September 10 of that year, at which time Bishop William Rollinson Whittingham wrote: "I cannot doubt that its beautiful edifice, when finished in the autumn, will be fully occupied by as regular and devout worshipers as now fill the little upper room, where prayer is wont to be daily made through so large a portion of the year." The church was consecrated by Bishop Whittingham on Thursday February 19, 1846. In 1885, Long's nephew T. Buckler Ghequier added the chancel. The twelve-foot-high main altar of white Vermont marble was designed by American artist John LaFarge. The altar area is set out with encaustic tile from Mintons, and the glass in the Gothic windows contains a depiction of the Good Shepherd produced by Tiffany & Co. The rood was carved by the Swedish sculptor Thorsten Sigstedt, who also designed the church's Marian shrine, and was dedicated on December 15, 1940, and the altar of Christ the King was designed by E. Donald Robb, who worked for the architecture company of Ralph Adams Cram. A reliquary in the main church houses a bone fragment of Saint Edward the Confessor. The bell, which dates to the nineteenth century, was cast by the McShane Bell Foundry. The spire of the church collapsed in March 1914, during a blizzard.

The church features an Andover-Flentrop organ of C. B. Fisk Inc., an innovative organ of 1961 that is included in the listing of historic organs of the Organ Historical Society. The historic Fisk pipe organ was played in recital during the Organ Historical Society Convention in July 2024. A former organist at Mount Calvary was the composer Caryl Florio (born William James Robjohn).

Bishop Whittingham wrote that “there are larger, more costly, and more splendid churches in Baltimore, but there is none in my judgement so well adapted to make the worshipper feel he must ‘keep his foot’ for he is in the house of God.”

== Liturgy ==
Mount Calvary was founded shortly after the publication in England of the Tracts for the Times, when the Oxford Movement neared its height. It began as a High Church mission parish of St. Paul's Episcopal Church (Baltimore, Maryland) established by the Reverend William Wyatt, and until the current building was available services were held in a room above a bacon store on the corner of Howard and Mulberry Streets. Under a series of pastors, the parish became more in line with Anglo-Catholicism, which emphasized the Catholic heritage of the Episcopal Church rather than its Protestant roots, and this caused friction between a number of pastors and their bishops. In 1868, during the rectorship of Alfred Allen Paul Curtis, Mount Calvary became the first Episcopal Church in the country to offer daily Eucharist.

Bishop William Rollinson Whittingham of the Episcopal Diocese of Maryland – and former rector of Mount Calvary – criticized Father Joseph Richey (elsewhere described as “a man of a lovely spirit, holy, self-sacrificing, full of labors”) for the use of altar lights, wafer bread, elevating the Host, making the sign of the cross, carrying a cross in procession, and praying for the dead. A Board of Inquiry spoke of its "unanimous and emphatic condemnation of the alleged teachings of Rev. Messrs. William Perry and Joseph Richey." In 1879, eleven local Episcopalian ministers published a pamphlet objecting to a mission held at Mount Calvary, led by Basil W. Maturin, that had advocated confession, the Real Presence of Christ in the Eucharist, and the Mass as a sacrifice. A year later, the Rev. Calbraith Perry and the Mount Calvary vestry nominated two candidates, one for holy orders and the other a deacon to receive priesthood, but both were objected to by the Standing Committee of the Diocese, who stated that the testimonials from the Rev. Perry and the vestry – declaring that the candidates had not taught or believed anything contrary to Church teaching – were not sufficient. William Pinkney (bishop), a low church Anglican, declined to engage the Standing Committee on this matter.

The New York Times reported, “The advanced ritualism practiced in the services has on various occasions led to spicy discussions between the Standing Committee and the Rectors of Mount Calvary." The same article reported that one of the parish clergymen, Father Calbraith Perry, was admonished and instructed “to cease using incense and not to wear a cope.” In 1894, Mount Calvary was "practically excommunicated" when Bishop William Paret – whose "stinging philippic fell from the lips" – refused to visit the church to administer the sacraments, for the church – over the bishop's objections – had installed confessionals and continued to use incense. Even so, Richard Meux Benson, co-founder of the Society of St. John the Evangelist, chose to spend Lent in Baltimore in 1895 and lectured on Thursday evenings at Mount Calvary and would visit again, speaking on Palm Sunday on March 29, 1896, and preaching at the parish on Low Sunday, April 17, 1898.

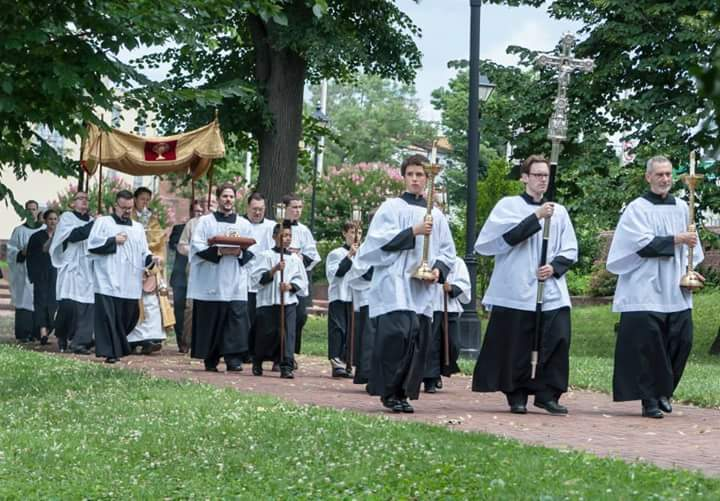
Corpus Christi Procession at Mount Calvary

The historic traditional ritual at Mount Calvary made use of the 1662 Book of Common Prayer and the English Missal. Since being received into the Roman Catholic Church in 2012, as a community within the Personal Ordinariate of the Chair of Saint Peter, Mass is celebrated ad orientem and follows the liturgical calendar of the Ordinariate; the feast of title is Holy Cross Day. and Solemn Evensong is celebrated once a month, which incorporates Eucharistic adoration and Anglican chant.

Solemn processions occur several times throughout the year, most notably on the feast of Corpus Christi. At such times, a thirty-pound silver processional cross is used (see photo). The cross was a gift to Mount Calvary from Mary Coale Redwood, whose son George was the first Baltimore officer to be killed in the First World War. It was crafted by the Warham Guild and features Christus Triumphans, as well as scenes from the life of Christ and the symbols of the four evangelists.

== Ministry ==
One of the early parishioners was Robert E. Lee, who “attended Mount Calvary Episcopal Church regularly” when working on Fort Carroll in 1849 and living at 908 Madison Avenue. Baltimore was a city sharply divided during the American Civil War. The pastor of Mount Calvary Alfred Allen Paul Curtis (who later converted to Catholicism and became the second bishop of the Roman Catholic Diocese of Wilmington) wrote that the Union victories were “steps and stages towards eventual ruin” and that they were “matters of humiliation and not of thanksgiving.” Episcopalian Bishop Whittingham reacted by ceasing to be a pew holder at Mount Calvary, saying that he did not wish to be “associated with a body so treasonably ungrateful for Divine Mercy shown in the deliverance of the State from armed rebels and thieves.” In spite of the early support of its rector for the Confederacy, Mount Calvary would become known for its outreach to the African-American community. The vestry voted "there should be no racial lines in the free seats of Mount Calvary Church," making it the first Episcopal church in Maryland to integrate. The parish "made an enviable name for itself by the remarkable work done by its clergy among the poor of the city” and was "renowned for its charitable work." Much of this reputation was due to the work of the curate Father Calbraith Bourn Perry, great-nephew of Oliver Hazard Perry, whose experiences formed the basis for his book Twelve Years Among the Colored People, a Record of the Work of Mount Calvary Chapel of S. Mary the Virgin, Baltimore. Perry was also the author of A Petition in Behalf of the Colored People In 1900, it was proclaimed that Mount Calvary was “the head centre of very wholesome educational and social work in Baltimore and deserves better and wider appreciation.”

The parish founded and served three daughter churches for Baltimore's African-American community. Two of these churches, Saint Mary the Virgin, founded in 1873, and Saint Katherine of Alexandria, founded in 1891, became independent parishes. By 1881, Saint Mary the Virgin had become the largest African-American Episcopalian parish in the country and “became the church of Baltimore’s aristocrats of color.” The chapel featured a sculpture commissioned by the congregation of Mount Calvary, the Adoration of the Magi by African-American artist Edmonia Lewis. In 1872, Mother Harriet Brownlow Byron, co-founder (with the Rev. William Upton Richards) and superior of the All Saints Sisters of the Poor in England, sent Sisters Helen, Serena, and Winifred to Baltimore to establish a community and “to do Mission work in Mount Calvary parish.” In 1987, the sisters and the parish jointly founded a hospice adjacent to Mount Calvary, the Joseph Richey House, named after the former pastor who, in 2004, was added to the calendar of Lesser Feasts and Fasts of the Episcopal Diocese of Maryland, with a feast day of September 23. Dr. Bob's Place, the children's hospice, was opened by Joseph Richey House in June 2011.

== Rectors ==
- 1841–1842 Matthias L. Forbes, a native of Kingston, Ontario, who died in 1883, aged 71
- 1842–1844 John W. Hoffman
- 1844–1853 Alfred A. Miller
- 1853–1854 William Rollinson Whittingham, bishop of the Episcopal Diocese of Maryland
- 1854–1858 Cornelius E. Swope was one of the first two students to graduate from St. James School, Maryland
- 1858–1861 Thomas Richey, older brother of Joseph Richey, he became the second president of Bard College
- 1861–1862 Christopher B. Wyatt, who in 1869 received an honorary doctorate in divinity from the College of William and Mary
- 1862–1872 Alfred Allen Paul Curtis, future bishop of the Roman Catholic Diocese of Wilmington
- 1872–1877 Joseph Richey, younger brother of Thomas Richey.
- 1878–1908 Robert H. Paine, at whose Mass to mark 25th anniversary of ordination to the priesthood, James Huntington presided.
- 1908–1948 William Adams McClenthen
- 1948–1958 Henry N. Botts
- 1958–1966 MacAllister S. Ellis
  - Donald L. Garfield, curate
- 1966–1994 Rudolph L. Ranieri Jr.
- 1994–2000 William H. Ilgenfritz
- 2001–2006 John W. Klein
- 2006–2012 Jason Catania

== Parochial administrators ==
Following reception into the Catholic Church, the title of rector was abolished. From 2012 to 2016, Mount Calvary was a quasi-parish, with the priest in charge holding the title of parochial administrator.

- 2012–2014 Jason Catania
- 2014–2016 Albert Scharbach

== Pastors ==
In 2016, Mount Calvary's status was elevated to a full-fledged parish, with its priest holding the title of pastor.

- 2016–present Albert Scharbach

== Recent developments ==
In 2009, Pope Benedict XVI promulgated the apostolic constitution Anglicanorum Coetibus which enabled Anglican and Episcopal parishes and individuals to enter full communion with the Roman Catholic church. Mount Calvary voted in 2010 to separate from the Episcopal Church and to seek to become a community within the ordinariate. Mount Calvary became the first congregation to be received into the Personal Ordinariate of the Chair of St. Peter by its ordinary, Jeffrey N. Steenson, on January 22, 2012. Mount Calvary was elevated to the status of a parish by Steven J. Lopes on November 6, 2016, on which date he also consecrated the altar, placing within it some relics of John of the Cross.
