= Thomas Richey =

Irish-American Anglo-Catholic priest and author

Thomas Richey (November 1, 1831 — June 3, 1905) was a prominent Irish-American Anglo-Catholic priest, professor, and author in the Episcopal Church. He was born in Newry, County Down, in Ireland and had settled in Pittsburgh by 1847, following his graduation at 16 from Queen's College, Belfast. Richey was a tutor at St. James College, Hagerstown, Maryland under John Barrett Kerfoot from 1848-1851. He was graduated from the General Theological Seminary of the Episcopal Church in 1854 and ordained to the priesthood by Bishop Horatio Potter in 1855.

== Ecclesiastical career ==
From 1854 to 1858, Richey was rector of St. Luke's, Catskill, an important early American Tractarian parish center. He was then called to the rectorship of Mount Calvary Church, Baltimore, where he served from 1858 to 1862. Between 1864 and 1869, he was the second dean of St. Stephen's College, Annandale on Hudson, now known as Bard College, and from 1863 to 1867 as the rector of Saint James Church, Fordham, in the Bronx. From 1869 to 1879, Richey was professor of ecclesiastical history at the former Seabury Divinity School in Faribault, Minnesota. In 1879 he was appointed St. Mark's Church in the Bowery Professor of Church History at his alma mater, the General Theological Seminary, and he served in this capacity until 1902. The New-York Tribune's obituary identified Richey as "the most popular and beloved professor in the seminary." The seminary's board of trustees requested his resignation on the grounds of infirmity in 1902; Richey declined the offer of a pension and insisted on retirement at half salary with status as professor emeritus.

== As author ==
Richey's handbooks on the "rights and duties of rectors, wardens, vestrymen, etc." were first published in 1866 and went through many editions. His 1897 response to the papal encyclical Apostolicae curae on Anglican ordinations preceded the official response (Saepius Officio) by the Archbishop of Canterbury and the Archbishop of York. He received an honorary Doctor of Divinity degree from Union Theological Seminary.

== Personal life ==
His brother Joseph Richey was also a major Anglo-Catholic clergy figure in Baltimore, who is now included in the Lesser Feasts and Fasts of the Episcopal Diocese of Maryland. Neither Thomas Richey nor Joseph Richey are related to three other prominent Anglo-Catholic brother-priest contemporaries, Arthur Ritchie (1849-1921), Robert Ritchie (1845-1907), and Edward Ritchie (1851-1936). In 1858, Thomas Richey married Emma Cecelia Bacot (1833-1916), and they were survived by three daughters and two sons. He is buried at Rosedale Cemetery in Montclair, New Jersey. Richey's daughter Maud married Judge Samuel Seabury, a descendant of Samuel Seabury, first bishop of the Protestant Episcopal Church. His sons Alban (1860-1934) and Francis (1874-1959) both became priests.

== Bibliography ==
- On Moral Unity, and the Way of Its Attainment (1861)
- The Parish Hand-book: A Practical Guide on the Rights and Duties of Rectors, Wardens, Vestrymen, etc. (1866)
- Truth and Counter Truth (1869)
- The Churchman's Hand-book: A Practical Guide on the Rights and Duties of Rectors, Wardens, Vestrymen, etc. (1879)
- The Question of the Day: What is the Bible, for What Object was It Written, and How Is It to Be Read? (1882)
- The Redemption of the Creature: A Sermon Preached before the Annual Convention of the Diocese of New York (1882)
- The Nicene Creed and the Filioque (1884)
- Prayer Book Revision in England and America (1886)
- The Parables of the Lord Jesus according to S. Matthew (1890)
- "Syrian Christianity and the School of Antioch" in The History and Teachings of the Early Church as a Basis for the Re-union of Christendom: Lectures Delivered in 1888, under the Auspices of the Church Club, in Christ Church, N.Y. (1893)
- Heads of Church History for Use in the General Theological Seminary (1894)
- "The Primitive Church" in Five Lectures Upon the Church Delivered before the Church Club of the Diocese of Connecticut (1896)
- Leo XIII and Anglican Orders: The Proper Gift of the Christian Ministry and the Sacraments (1897)
- Points in Church History, for Schools and Colleges (1899)
