= John James Joseph Monaghan =

American prelate

His Excellency, The Most Reverend John James Joseph Monaghan
- Bishop of Wilmington
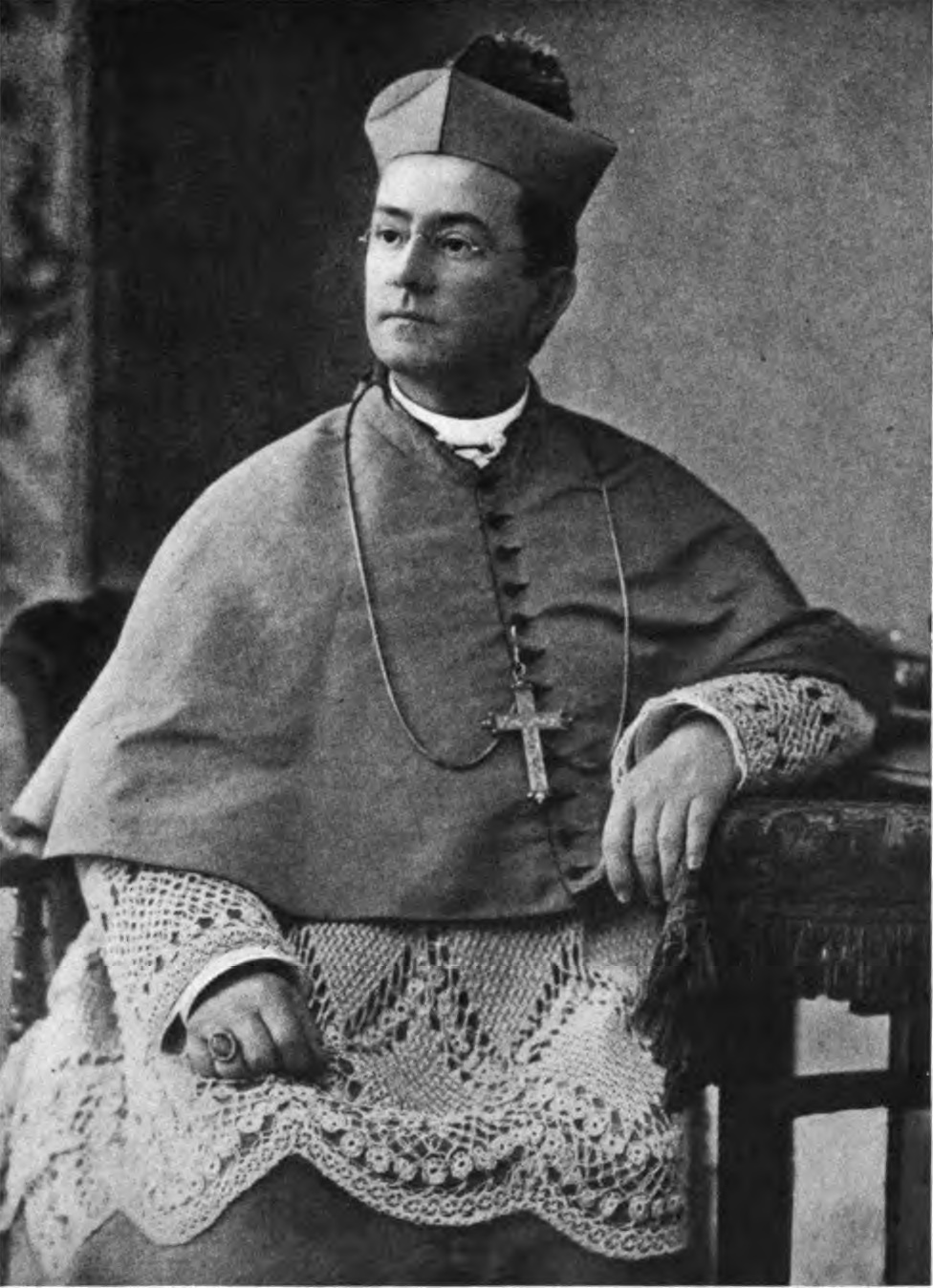
- See: Diocese of Wilmington
- Installed: May 9, 1897
- Term ended: July 10, 1925
- Predecessor: Alfred Allen Paul Curtis
- Successor: Edmond John Fitzmaurice
- Other post: Titular Bishop of Lydda (1925–1935)

Orders
- Ordination: December 19, 1880 by Patrick Neeson Lynch
- Consecration: May 9, 1897 by James Gibbons

Personal details
- Born: May 23, 1856 Sumter, South Carolina, US
- Died: January 7, 1935 (aged 78) Wilmington, Delaware, US
- Denomination: Roman Catholic Church
- Education: St. Charles College; St. Mary's Seminary
- Motto: Deus incrementum dat (God gives growth)

Styles of John James Joseph Monaghan
- Reference style: His Excellency; The Most Reverend
- Spoken style: Your Excellency
- Religious style: bishop

John James Joseph Monaghan (May 23, 1856 – January 7, 1935) was an American prelate of the Roman Catholic Church. He served as bishop of the Diocese of Wilmington in Delaware from 1897 to 1925.

== Biography ==
=== Early life ===
John Monaghan was born in 1856, in Sumter, South Carolina, to Thomas and Margaret (née Bogan) Monaghan, both Irish immigrants. He graduated from St. Charles College in Ellicott City, Maryland, in 1876, and then studied theology at St. Mary's Seminary in Baltimore.

=== Priesthood ===
Returning to South Carolina, Monaghan was ordained to the priesthood in Charleston, South Carolina, by Bishop Patrick Neeson Lynch for the Diocese of Charleston on December 19, 1880. He first served as a curate at St. Joseph's Parish and afterwards at St. Patrick's Parish, both in Charleston. Monaghan was appointed pastor of St. Mary's Parish in Greenville, South Carolina, serving there from 1882 to 1887. He then became pro-rector of the Cathedral of St. John the Baptist in Charleston and chancellor of the diocese (1887–1888). From 1888 to 1897, Monaghan was assistant to the vicar general at St. Patrick's Church.

=== Bishop of Wilmington ===
On January 26, 1897, Monaghan was appointed the third bishop of Wilmington by Pope Leo XIII. Monaghan received his episcopal consecration on May 9, 1987, from Cardinal James Gibbons, at the Pro-Cathedral of St. Peter in Wilmington, with Bishops Alfred Curtis and Henry Northrop serving as co-consecrators.

During his tenure, Monaghan established seven parishes, seven missions, and eight schools. He also was instrumental in the establishment of the Oblate Fathers' Salesianum School for boys in Wilmington, St. Francis Hospital in Wilmington, and a home for the elderly.

=== Retirement ===
On July 10, 1925, Pope Pius XI accepted Monaghan's resignation as bishop of Wilmington due to bad health and named him titular bishop of Lydda. John Monaghan died on January 7, 1935, at age 78 at St. Francis Hospital in Wilmington.

== See also ==
- Catholic Church hierarchy
- Catholic Church in the United States
- Historical list of the Catholic bishops of the United States
- List of Catholic bishops of the United States
- Lists of patriarchs, archbishops, and bishops

Catholic Church titles
Preceded by Alfred Allen Paul Curtis	Bishop of Wilmington; 1897–1925	Succeeded by Edmond John Fitzmaurice
