= Public School No. 19 =

- U.S. National Register of Historic Places
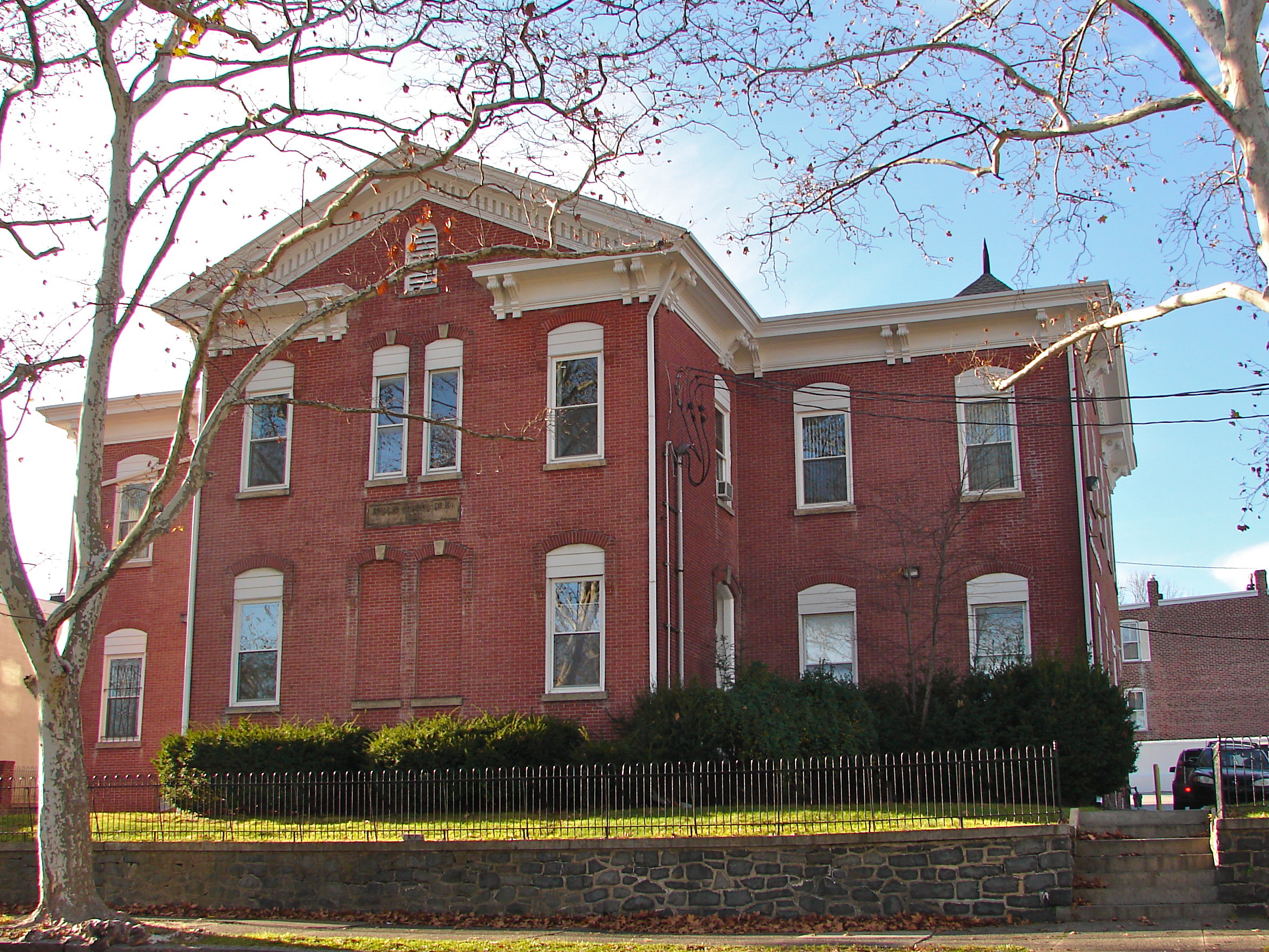
- School 19, November 2010

- Location within Delaware Location within the United States
- Location: 801 S. Harrison St., Wilmington, Delaware
- Coordinates: 39.737440°N 75.568606°W
- Area: 0.5 acres (0.20 ha)
- Built: 1881
- Architect: Graham, G., & Son
- Architectural style: Italianate
- NRHP reference No.: 84000453
- Added to NRHP: December 20, 1984

Public School No. 19, also known as St. Hedwig's High School, is a historic elementary school building located at Wilmington, New Castle County, Delaware. It was built in 1881, and is a two-story, cruciform-shaped brick building in the Italianate style. It has a low hipped roof and a heavy wood pediment is trimmed with elongated dentils and bracketed cornice returns. It operated as a public school until leased to St. Hedwig's Roman Catholic Church for use as a Catholic high school. St. Hedwig's High School closed in the 1970s and the building converted to offices.

It was added to the National Register of Historic Places in 1984.
