= Quaker Hill Historic District (Wilmington, Delaware) =

Historic district in Delaware, United States

- U.S. National Register of Historic Places
- U.S. Historic district
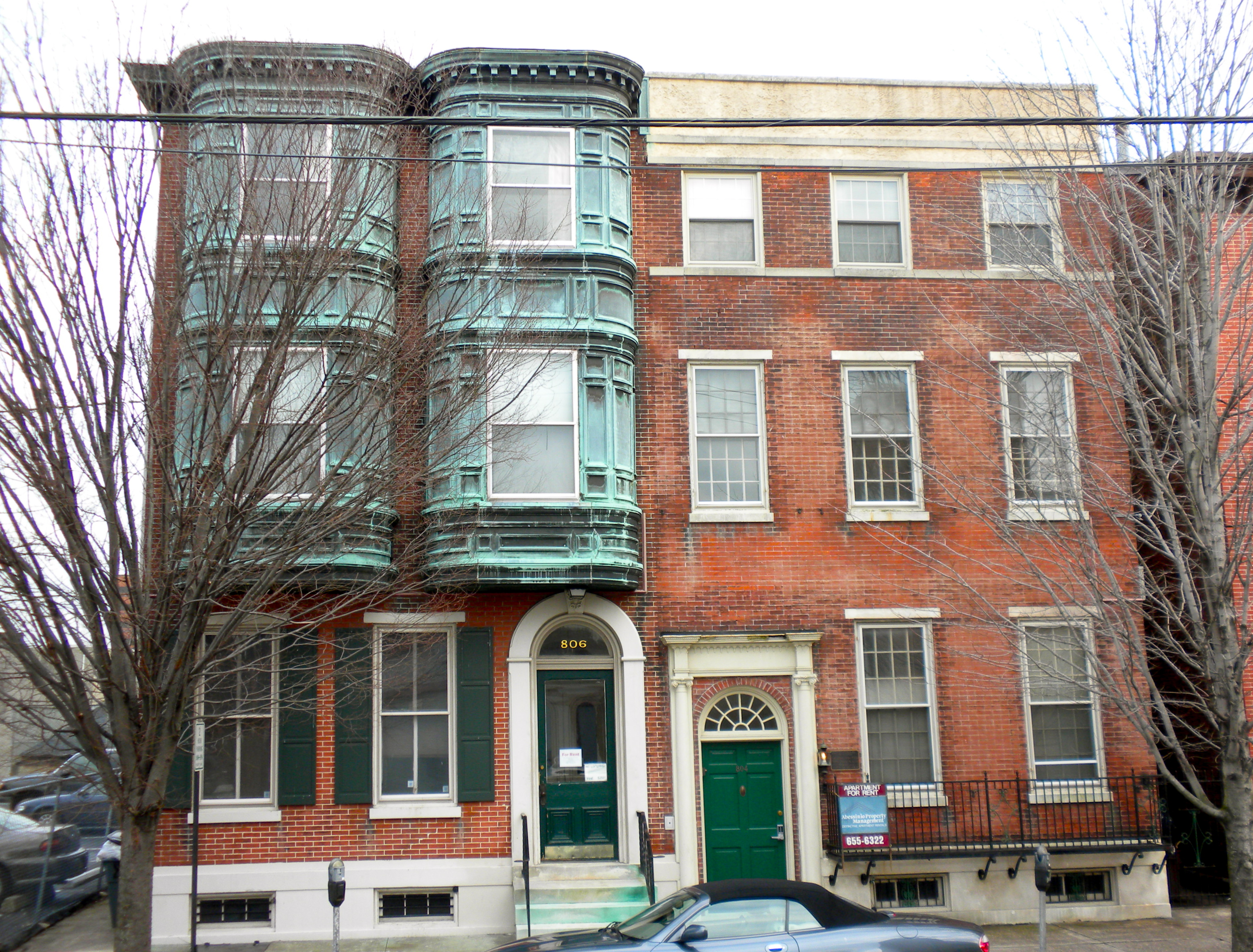
- The northernmost boundary along West St.

- Location within Delaware Location within the United States
- Location: Roughly bounded by Tatnall, Jefferson, 2nd and 7th Sts. (original); roughly bounded by Eighth, Catawba and Washington, Sixth and Seventh, and Wollaston Sts. (increase); in Wilmington, Delaware
- Coordinates: 39°44′31″N 75°33′18″W
- Area: 20 acres (8.1 ha) (original); 5 acres (2.0 ha) (increase)
- Built: 1870
- Architect: Multiple
- Architectural style: Late 19th And 20th Century Revivals, Gothic, Italianate (original); Second Empire, Italianate, Gothic Revival (increase)
- NRHP reference No.: 79000635 and 85003221
- Added to NRHP: September 6, 1979 (original); December 19, 1985 (increase)

The Quaker Hill Historic District is a national historic district located at Wilmington, New Castle County, Delaware. It encompasses 151 contributing buildings in a residential neighborhood west of the central business district of Wilmington. The district includes 19th-century residential structures of all classes, along with several 19th-and 20th-century commercial structures. The predominant structures are three-story rowhouse dwellings in a variety of popular styles including Second Empire, Italianate, and Gothic Revival. Notable non-residential buildings include the Quaker Meetinghouse and Cemetery, St. Peter's Cathedral and Rectory (1816), Union Methodist Church, and New Mount Bethel Baptist Church

It was added to the National Register of Historic Places in 1979, with a boundary increase in 1985.

== Gallery ==
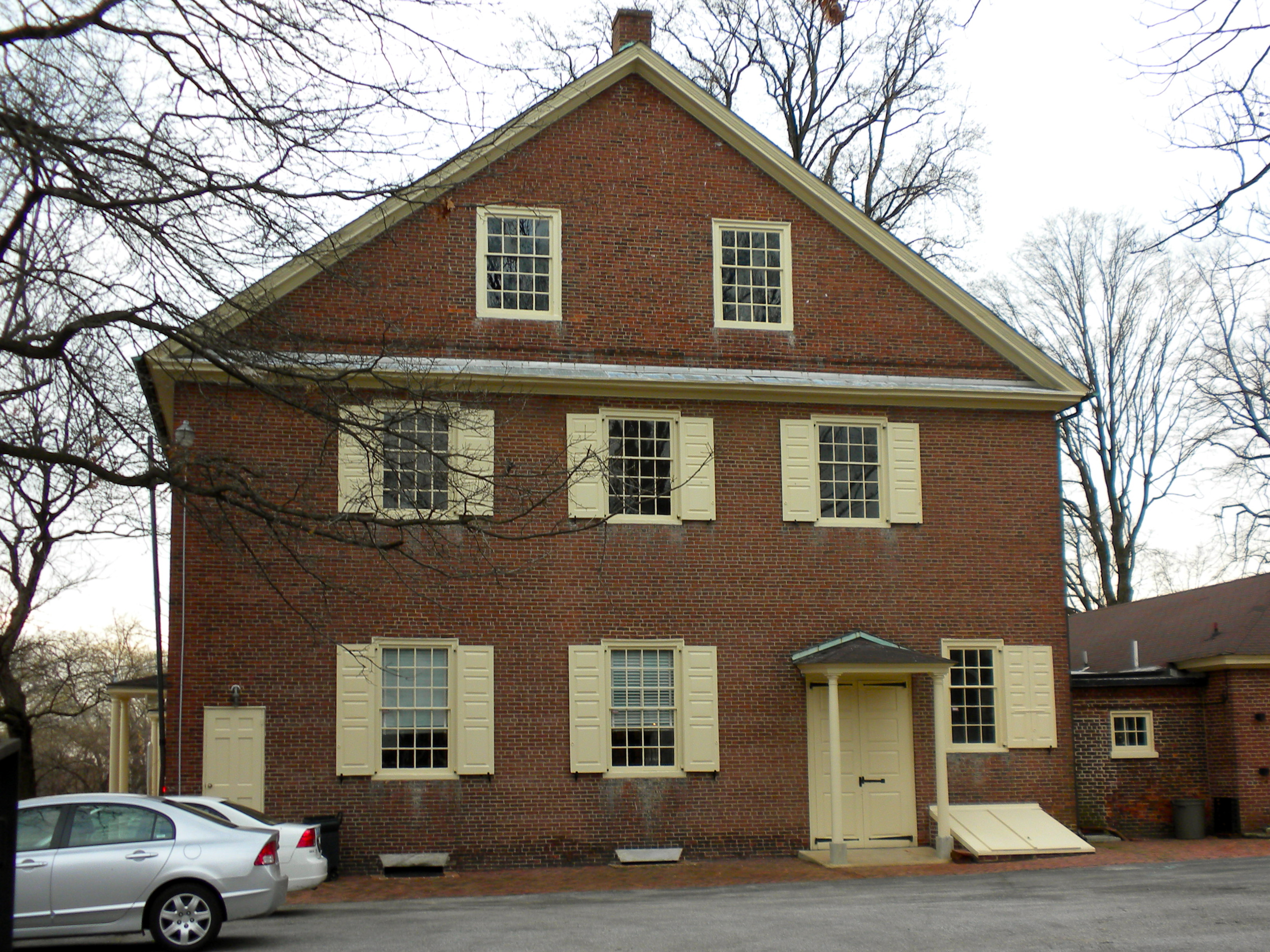
Friends Meeting House

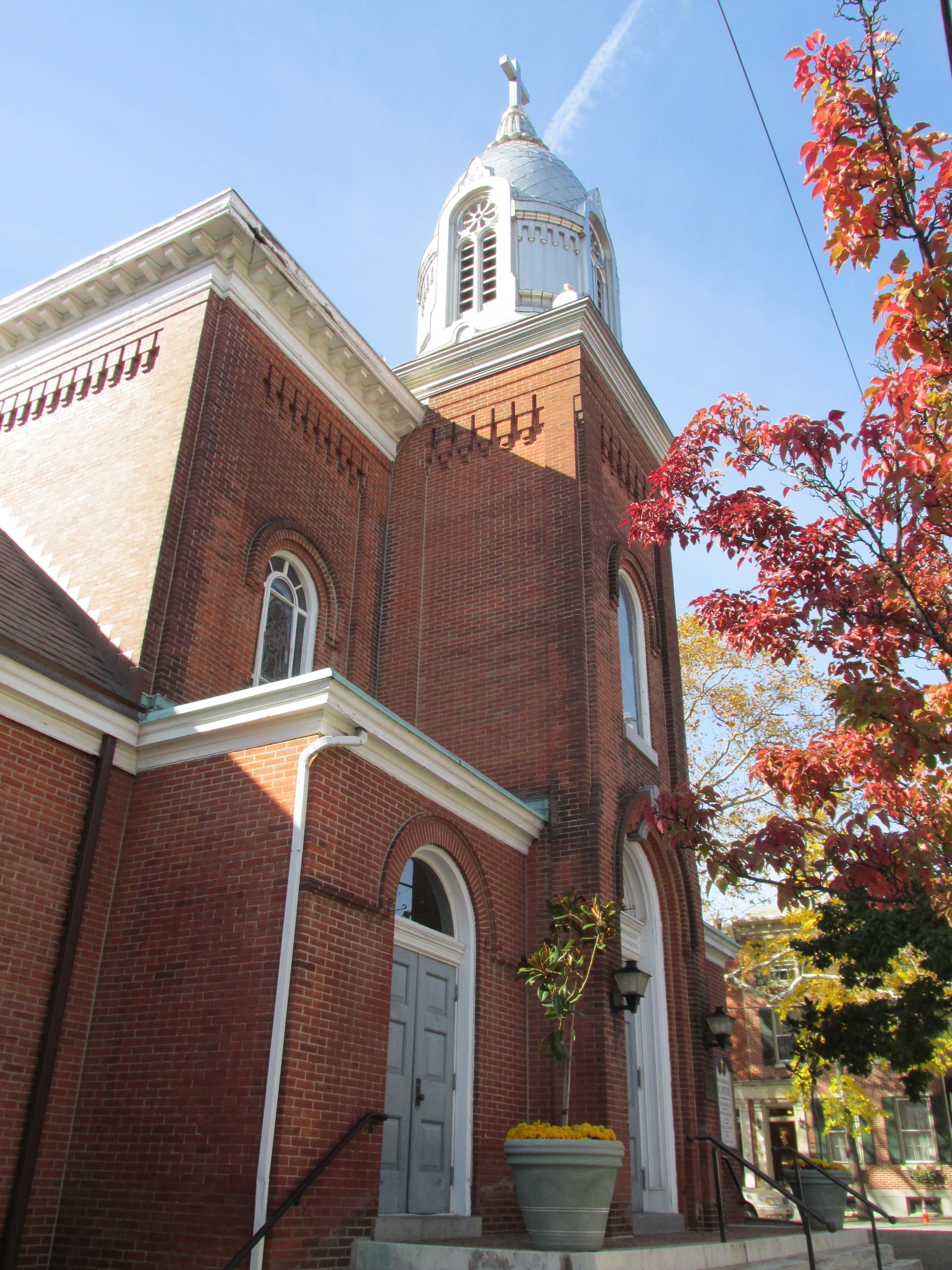
Cathedral of Saint Peter
