= St. Joseph's Church (Middletown, Delaware) =

Historic church in Delaware, United States

- U.S. National Register of Historic Places
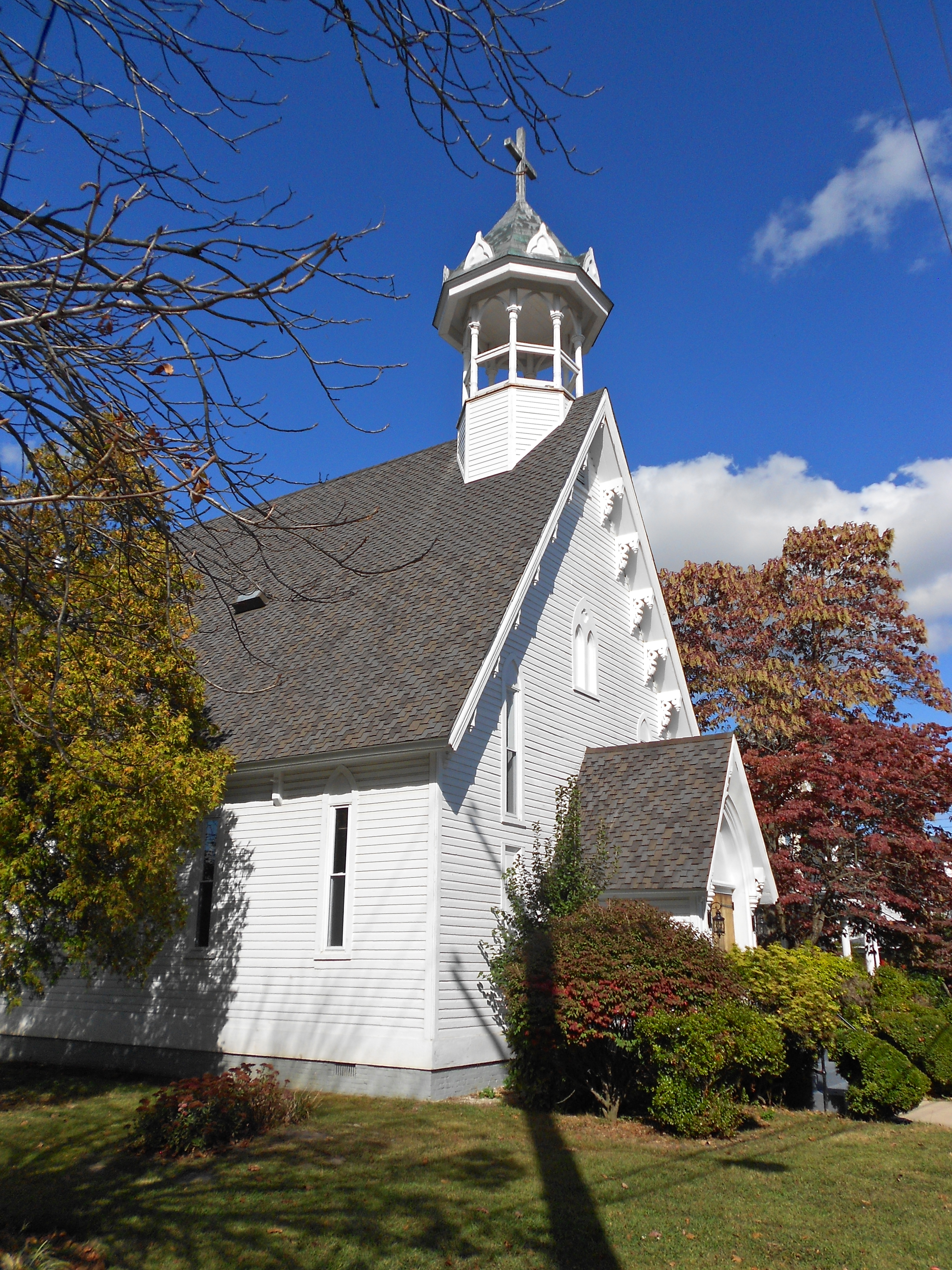
- The church in 2013

- Location within Delaware Location within the United States
- Location: 15 West Cochran Street, Middletown, Delaware
- Coordinates: 39.447639°N 75.718210°W
- Area: 0.5 acres (0.20 ha)
- Built: 1883-1884
- Architect: Stevens, Miller & Co.
- Architectural style: Late Gothic Revival
- NRHP reference No.: 78000899
- Added to NRHP: February 17, 1978

St. Joseph's Church is a historic Roman Catholic church at 17 W. Cochran Street in Middletown, New Castle County, Delaware. It was built in 1883–84, and is a small rectangular frame building in the vernacular Gothic Revival style. It has a steeply pitched gable roof with projecting eaves, German siding, belfry, and a two-story rear wing, added between 1885 and 1900. It is currently known as the Holy Hill Worship Center.

It was listed on the National Register of Historic Places in 1978.
