= William Rollinson Whittingham =

American bishop

The Right Reverend William Rollinson Whittingham D.D., LL.D.
- Bishop of Maryland
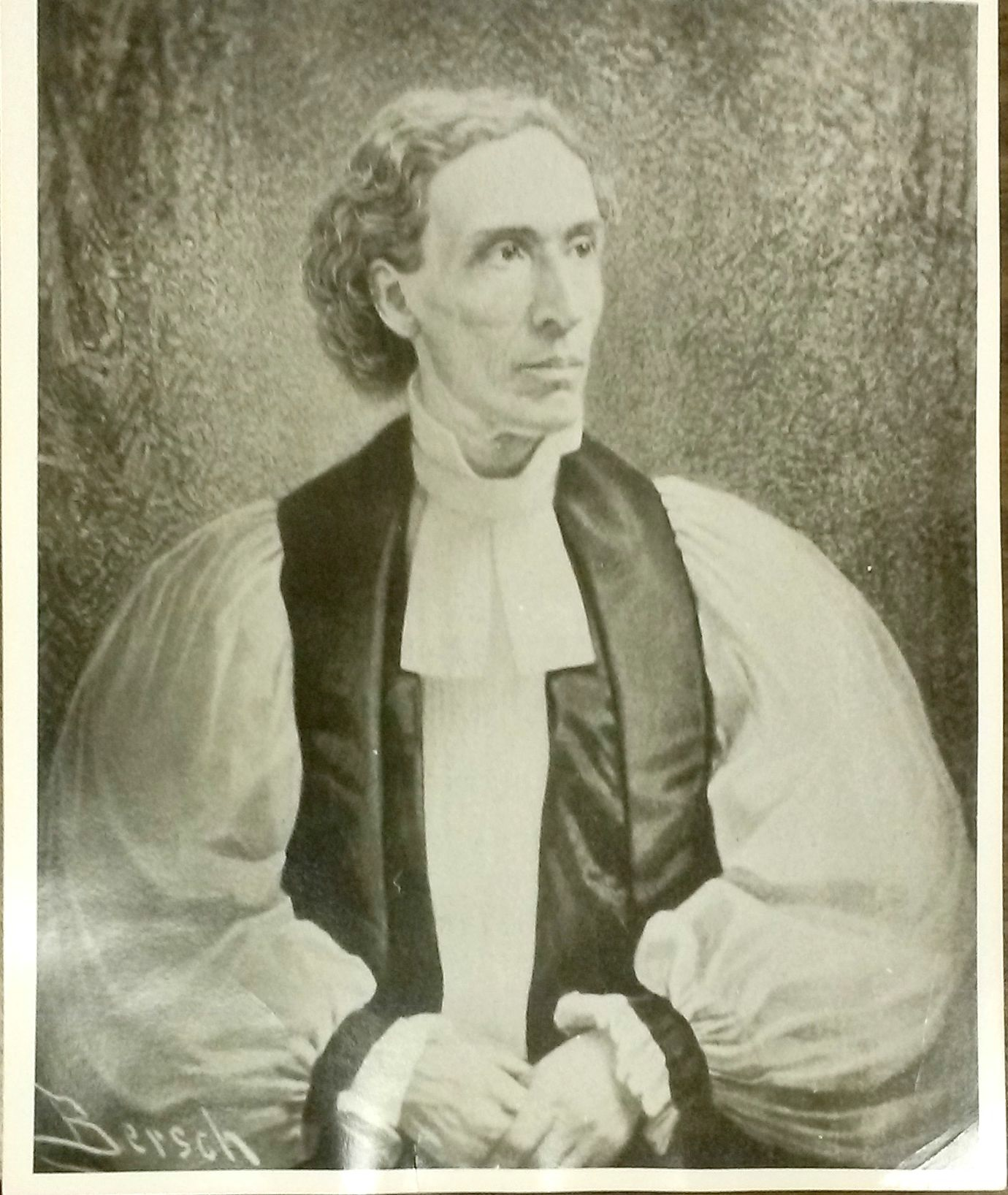
- Church: Episcopal Church
- Diocese: Maryland
- Elected: May 1840
- In office: 1840–1879
- Predecessor: William Murray Stone
- Successor: William Pinkney

Orders
- Ordination: December 17, 1829 by John Croes
- Consecration: September 17, 1840 by Alexander Viets Griswold

Personal details
- Born: December 2, 1805 New York City, United States
- Died: 17 October 1879 (aged 73) Orange, New Jersey, United States
- Buried: St Stephen's Church, Millburn, New Jersey
- Denomination: Anglican
- Parents: Richard Whittingham & Mary Anne Rollinson
- Spouse: Hannah Harrison
- Children: 4
- Education: General Theological Seminary; Columbia University

William Rollinson Whittingham (December 2, 1805 – October 17, 1879) was the fourth Episcopal Bishop of Maryland.

== Early life and career ==
Whittingham was born in New York City, the son of Richard Whittingham and Mary Ann Rollinson Whittingham. He was educated at home, and later attended the General Theological Seminary, graduating in 1825. He received the degree of Doctor of Sacred Theology from Columbia University in 1827. Whittingham was ordained deacon on March 11, 1827 by the Bishop of New York John Henry Hobart in Trinity Church. He was then assigned to missionary work in northern New Jersey. While there, he married Hannah Harrison; the couple ultimately had two sons and two daughters.

Whittingham was ordained priest on December 17, 1829 by the Bishop of New Jersey John Croes in St Mark's Church, Orange, New Jersey, which church he then became rector of. In 1831, he became the rector of St. Luke's, New York City, and remained there until 1836, when he accepted a professorship at the General Theological Seminary.

== Career as bishop ==
In 1840, a diocesan convention elected Whittingham bishop of Maryland. On September 17 of that year in St. Paul's, Baltimore, bishops Alexander Viets Griswold, Richard Channing Moore, and Benjamin Treadwell Onderdonk consecrated Whittingham, who thus became the 36th bishop of the Episcopal Church.

Bishop Whittingham founded several charitable and educational institutions, including the College of St. James in Hagerstown, an infirmary in Baltimore, an order of deaconesses, and the Sisterhood of St. John in Washington, D.C. (then part of the diocese). He also became known for his solicitude toward African-Americans in his diocese, both from his support of St. James' First African Church in Baltimore, and for always setting aside the afternoons during his visitations within the diocese for meetings with and instructions for African Americans, some of whom were undoubtedly slaves.

In 1853, he defended himself against charges of "Romanism," denouncing the Roman Catholic church and denying any sympathy with it.

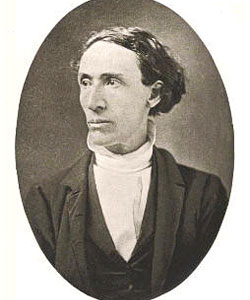
William Rollinson Whittingham

At the beginning of the American Civil War in 1861, Whittingham advocated for the Union cause, and sent a letter of praise to Governor Thomas Holliday Hicks for refusing to convene a special legislative session concerning secession. This temporarily estranged him from the sympathies of many of his congregants. Many criticized him for intruding the church into affairs of state. Bishop Whittingham also brought several priests who refused to say prayers for the President before ecclesiastical tribunals, for failing to follow his orders. Until 1863, he refused to characterize himself as an abolitionist, merely a supporter of the joint and lawful decision of Congress and the Lincoln administration to restore the Union by force of arms. He also commended to his clergy the Lincoln administration's various calls for days of prayer or thanksgiving during the war, while offering parishioners alternate prayers, although a number of Southern-sympathizing still parishes refused to comply.

Bishop Whittingham's evolving attitude may have helped him to work to unify the church when the war ended, since Bishop Davis of South Carolina and Bishop Elliott of Georgia consulted him after many African-Americans left the Episcopal Church in favor of "various colored denominations which came to birth at that time."

However, the diocese of Maryland also experienced considerable division and chaos during and after the war. Maryland Episcopalians served on both sides during the war, and considerable fighting occurred on Maryland soil, but Bishop Whittingham never visited a battlefield or hospital. His son, Dr. Edward T. Whittingham, for three years served as a Union Army surgeon in the eastern theater, first under General Philip Kearny of New Jersey, who died on September 1, 1862. As the war ended, ill-feeling remained, particularly against Union occupying forces and loyalty oaths (especially after a scandal concerning the Bishop's recommending they also be required of clergy). Because President Andrew Johnson first declared a day of mourning for his assassinated predecessor on May 25, the Feast of the Ascension in 1865, and then moved it to June 1, which would be the second day of the diocesan convention, Bishop Whittingham attempted to postpone the latter, but was initially defeated. Many delegates had stayed home, others selected an alternate date (13 September immediately before the Feast of the Holy Cross instead of September 27 as their bishop requested).

In 1869 the Diocese of Easton, which had many Southern sympathizers, was set off from Maryland, and former Confederate bishop Henry C. Lay became its first bishop. In 1870 Reverend William Pinkney was appointed to assist Bishop Whittingham with his labors.

In 1872 Whittingham represented the American church at the Lambeth conference, and he subsequently attended the meeting of Old Catholics at Bonn in a similar capacity. Furthermore, at the General Convention in 1874, Bishop Whittingham presented a plan for Missionary Districts staffed by African-American priests who could evangelize outside diocesan boundaries. Although Whittingham had formulated the plan based on his experience and correspondence with the bishops of South Carolina and Georgia, bishop Atkinson of North Carolina and bishop Williams of Connecticut opposed it, and it did not pass. However, African-American clergy resurrected the "Whittingham Canon" at the General Conventions in 1907, 1910 and 1913.

Whittingham wrote and edited several books. He wrote the introduction and notes and was the editor of The Parish Library of Standard Works (13 vols., 1828 el seq.); Jahn's Introduction to the Old Testament with Dr. Samuel H. Turner (1827); William Palmer's Treatise on the Church of Christ (2 vols., 1841); the Commonitorium of Vincent of Larius: being a new translation with notes, etc. (1847); and Ratramm on the Lord's Supper (revised translation, 1848). Whittingham also contributed, with three other clergymen, to "Essays and Dissertations in Biblical Literature." He also edited the Family Visitor and Children's Magazine (both monthly publications), and "The Churchman" (issued weekly). Bishop Whittingham also called for the preservation of church records in his diocese in 1855 and appointed Ethan Allen as the diocese's first historian, thus helping to gather early church records and publish Clergy in Maryland of the Protestant Episcopal church since the independence of 1783 in 1860.

Bishop Whittingham was a high churchman, although he modified his opinions later in life, possibly in light of criticism of Anglo-Catholic practices as "popery." Several controversies with his clergy on points of church government ensued. Reverend Dr. Joseph Trapnell, of St. Andrew's, argued with Bishop Whittingham concerning the prior episcopal right to celebrate communion at confirmations. During the Civil War, Whittingham rebuked some clergy for omitting the prayers for President Lincoln from services. Finally, in 1876 he was presented for not bringing to trial Joseph Richey, the rector of Mount Calvary Church (where he himself had served as rector), for reading prayers for the dead.

== Death and legacy ==
For many years before his death, Whittingham was an invalid. His last official act was performed on November 7, 1878. At the time of his consecration he was the youngest of the American bishops: at his death he was the second-oldest, having been in office thirty-nine years. He died in Orange, New Jersey on October 17, 1879, and was buried at St. Stephens Episcopal Cemetery in Millburn, New Jersey.

Project Canterbury published some of his sermons and letters online. The cornerstone of St. Katherine of Alexandria Episcopal Church in Baltimore mentions being consecrated in his memory.

== Sources ==
- William Francis Brand, Life of Williams Rollinson Whittingham, fourth bishop of Mary (E. & J.B. Young & Co., New York 1886)

Episcopal Church (USA) titles
Preceded by William Murray Stone	Bishop of Maryland; 1840 – 1879	Succeeded by William Pinkney
