= Richard Meux Benson =

Anglican priest (1824–1915)

Richard Meux Benson SSJE
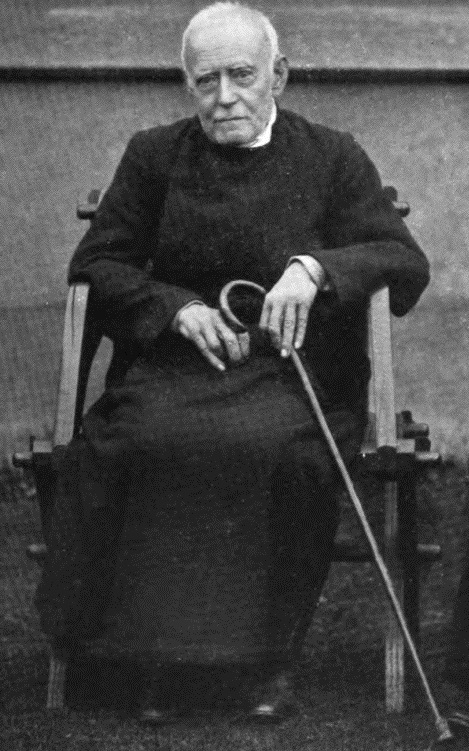
- The Rev. Richard Meux Benson
- Born: 6 July 1824; London, England
- Died: 14 January 1915; Cowley, Oxford, England
- Venerated in: Anglican Church of Canada, Episcopal Church (United States)
- Feast: 15 January, 14 January

Richard Meux Benson SSJE (6 July 1824 – 14 January 1915) was a priest in the Church of England and founder of the Society of St. John the Evangelist, the first religious order of monks in the Anglican Communion since the Reformation. He is commemorated in the Calendar of Saints of the Anglican Church of Canada on 15 January and on the Episcopal Church calendar on 14 January with Charles Gore.

== Early life ==
Benson was born into a wealthy London family in 1824, the son of merchant Thomas Starling Benson and his second wife, Elizabeth Meux, daughter of Richard Meux. Henry Roxby Benson was his elder brother. Benson was taught at home by a private tutor and entered Christ Church, Oxford. After his degree and ordination and a curacy at Surbiton, in 1850 he became vicar of Cowley, Oxford. He was considered High Church.

In 1858, Benson conducted a retreat for priests using material taken in part from the Spiritual Exercises of Ignatius of Loyola. In 1859, having erected a new parish church dedicated to St. John the Evangelist, Benson planned a mission to India, but abandoned the plan at his bishop's request.

== Society of St John the Evangelist ==
In 1865, two priests joined Benson in Cowley to begin community life under the name of the Mission Priests of St. John the Evangelist with Benson as the superior. At the time there were only convents of Anglican women in England.

The form of religious life Benson instituted was not purely contemplative—its members engaged in active external ministry—but they recited the Divine Office together daily in choir. Benson also emphasised contemplation. The brothers were to have an hour's meditation daily if possible. The community also took a summer retreat of four weeks, later reduced to a fortnight. Benson prescribed other retreat days and silence days. As a religious founder, he concentrated on essentials, among which he advised life-vows (taken with precautions as to maturity); regular confession; choir office, prayer and meditation; and priestly ministry. Benson fully recognised his bishop's authority over the community's priests, who were clergy of the diocese, but not as extending to their private life together. From around 1868 until the opening of Keble College in 1870, Benson was the licensed master of Benson's Hall, a private hall of the University of Oxford based at the Mission House.

From 1870 to 1883 the society spread to the United States, India and South Africa. Benson himself made an American mission tour. In 1884 the society adopted a constitution and rule that Benson drafted.

During the society's formative phase, Benson continued his duties as a parish priest. In 1886, he resigned this ministry to devote all his attention to the society and its mission.

In 1890 Benson stepped aside for another to be elected superior. He spent one year in India and eight years at the American house in Boston. The season of Lent in 1895 he spent in Baltimore, giving lectures at several churches there. These included Mount Calvary Church, which had been denounced less than a year before by Bishop William Paret of the Episcopal Diocese of Maryland for its high church practices.

The last sixteen years of Benson's life were lived at home again. He celebrated the Eucharist as long as he could stand at the altar. During his last years, he was wheeled in a chair to receive communion every morning. He died on 14 January 1915.

Benson's writings influenced C. S. Lewis via Lewis' spiritual director Father Walter Adams, who was a member of the Society of St John the Evangelist.

== Works ==
- Benedictus Dominus
- The Divine Rule of Prayer, 1866
- The Final Passover, Vol. 1, 1893.
- The Final Passover, Vol. 2, Part 1, 1895.
- The Final Passover, Vol. 2, Part 2, 1895.
- The Final Passover, Vol. 3., Part 1, 1893.
- The Final Passover, Vol. 3., Part 2, 1893.
- Letters of Richard Meux Benson, 1916.
- The Magnificat, 1889.
- The Manual of Intercessory Prayer
- The War-Songs of the Prince of Peace, Vol. 1, 1901
- The War-Songs of the Prince of Peace, Vol. 2, 1901
