= Pierre Bauduy =

French refugee in the US (1769–1833)

- Born: 10 June 1769
- Died: 15 August 1833 (aged 64)
- Occupation: Businessman
- Spouse: Marie Madeleine de Goiran

Pierre Marie Joseph de Bauduy de Bellevue (10 June 1769 – 15 August 1833), known variously as Peter or Pierre Bauduy, was a French-Haitian American businessman. He was the first of the French refugees from the Haitian Revolution to settle in the United States, arriving in October 1791 in Wilmington, Delaware. He helped start the company that became DuPont.

== Biography ==
His family, slave owners based in Bordeaux, France, held interests in sugar plantations in Haiti including Bellevue, one of the largest in the world. His grandfather, also named Pierre de Bauduy, was a captain of the French militia in Haiti, then known as Saint-Domingue.

When he married Marie Madeleine de Goiran, her dowry included 52 slaves and 10,000 French livres. A letter dated September 26, 1769, reports that each member of the family received sugar worth 550,000 livres. A letter in June 1770 estimated losses caused by a drought at 600,000 livres.

On October 7, 1771, the grandfather sold his Haitian sugar interests for 2.2 million livres to his only son, Jean-Baptiste de Bauduy de Bellevue. Jean-Baptiste and his wife had two daughters (Céline and Félicité) and two sons (Pierre and Louis).

Pierre and his brother, the future baron and general Louis Bauduy, were educated in France. Pierre became lieutenant of the "Chasseurs de Picardie" at the age of 17; Louis was an officer of the dragoons. The two brothers returned to the Caribbean in 1790. On October 4, 1790, Pierre married Juliette des Chapelles, whose important correspondence would fuel the work of historians. Juliette was a childhood friend of Joséphine de Beauharnais, daughter of a family of planters from Martinique and future wife of Napoleon Bonaparte. The couple received an annual income of 30,000 livres paid by the two families.

The Haitian Revolution began in August 1791, and the family plantation was one of the first targets. For four months, Pierre's brother, his father and six other men lived barricaded in the Bellevue plantation. His father was killed by the rebels and the plantation burned.

Pierre's father-in-law, whose wife had apparently also just been killed, asked Pierre and Juliette to flee, promising to join them later with their baby, Ferdinand. The couple left Haiti on September 27, 1791, on a ship belonging to the French-American banker Stephen Girard which arrived on October 14 in Philadelphia.

Upon his arrival, he established a hackney carriage manufacturing business in Wilmington, Delaware, then returned to Haiti in 1795 to sell his plantation. In 1798, he purchased Monckton Park, a large property in Wilmington owned by the financier Robert Morris, and renamed it Eden Park. He is also credited as the architect of the original Wilmington City Hall, built the same year., and the Cathedral of Saint Peter.

Pierre and Louis Bauduy were close friends of Victor du Pont de Nemours, who introduced them to his brother Éleuthère Irénée du Pont de Nemours, who had arrived from France at the end of 1799. The articles of partnership for E.I. du Pont de Nemours & Company were signed in Paris on April 21, 1801. Pierre Bauduy signed later and purchased four of the 18 shares.

The company, based in Wilmington, focused on military supplies, initially providing woolen uniforms for French forces aiming to retake Haiti. Those included Pierre's brother, by then a captain in the French Army. Pierre promoted the use of merino wool, newly introduced to the United States by David Humphreys. The negotiated price was $25,000 but ultimately reached $100,000. To avoid any conflict of interest, the French consul in Washington demanded that a new company be created, with the assets of the old one transferred to France.

The U.S. company focused on developing gunpowder. It searched for a location for a powder mill without success. In January 1802, E.I. du Pont de Nemours went to visit the Bauduy brothers in Wilmington, but they had left, one for Haiti and the other for Argentina. Upon returning, Pierre signed an agreement with du Pont in August on the management of the company. In a letter dated November 23, 1804, President Thomas Jefferson confirmed to du Pont that the U.S. military would use his powder. The company eventually grew into the multinational DuPont.

That was not the only business deal between Bauduy and du Pont. In 1810, a new company was formed, called Du Pont, Bauduy & Co, by Victor du Pont, E.I. du Pont, Peter Bauduy and Raphael Du Planty, to manufacture merino woolen clothing in a factory in Louviers, Delaware.

Several letters report the cooling of relations between the partners, and Bauduy withdrew from the company in December 1814, then sold his shares in DuPont on February 18, 1815, at the end of the War of 1812. He left to found a sugar factory in Matanzas Province, Cuba. In 1827, the family settled in New York, and then in 1829 moved to Eden Park. He later moved back to Cuba, where he obtained Spanish citizenship and died of cholera at Havana in 1833.
