= St. Mary of the Immaculate Conception Church (Wilmington, Delaware) =

Historic church in Delaware, United States

- U.S. National Register of Historic Places
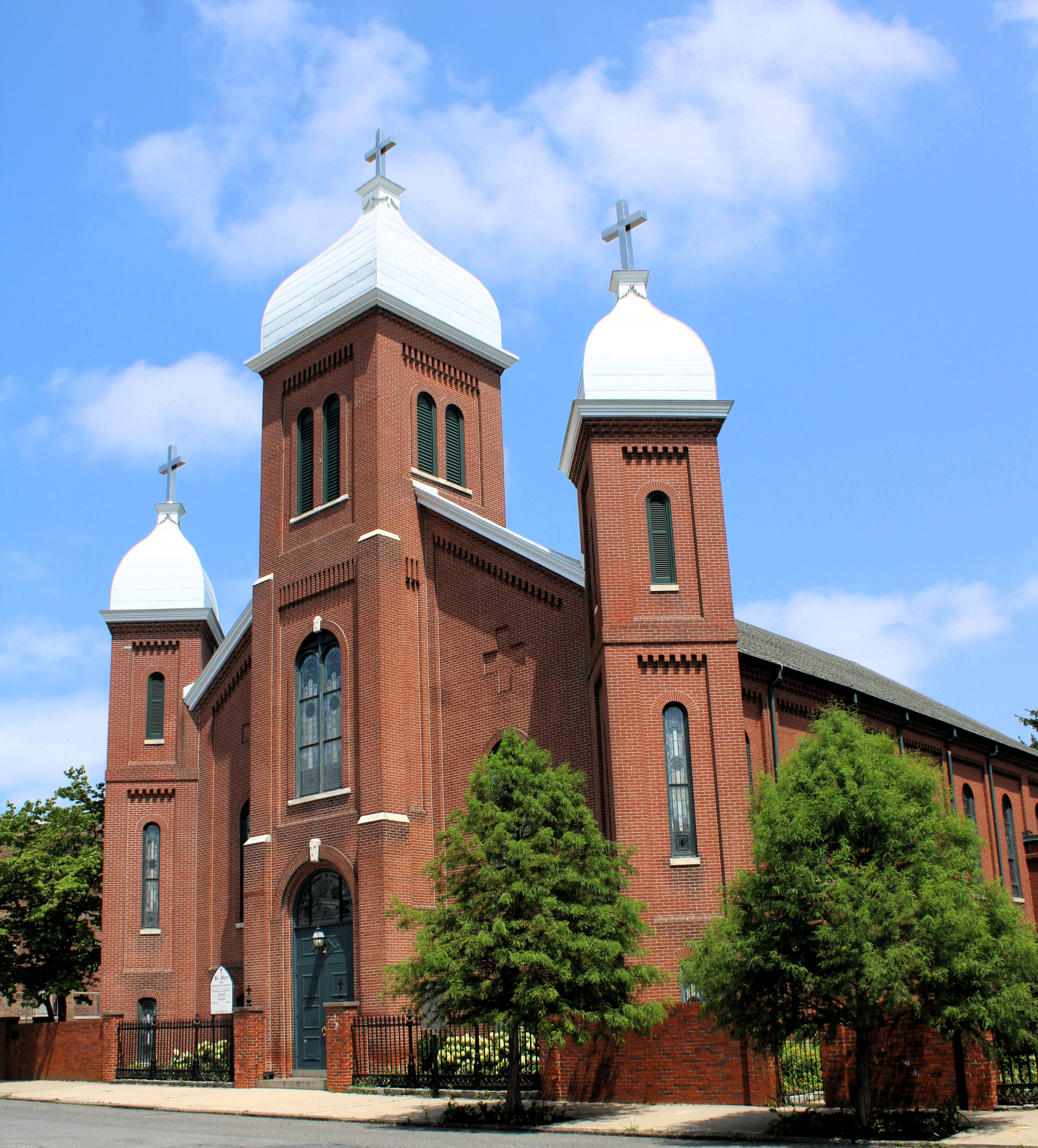
- St. Mary of the Immaculate Conception Church in 2025

- Location within Delaware Location within the United States
- Location: 600 E 6th Street; Wilmington, Delaware 19801
- Coordinates: 39.739125°N 75.544043°W
- Area: less than one acre
- Built: 1858
- Architect: McCloskey, Charles
- NRHP reference No.: 76000580
- Added to NRHP: December 12, 1976

St. Mary of the Immaculate Conception is a historic Roman Catholic church located at 600 E Sixth St. (6th and Pine Streets) in Wilmington, New Castle County, Delaware. St. Mary's is the only active church in Delaware founded by John Neumann, Bishop of Philadelphia 1852–1860, who consecrated it on October 31, 1858. The church and adjacent St. Mary's school were the principal institutions for worship and the education and integration of thousands of Irish immigrants in Wilmington, most of whom lived in the parish upon first arriving. The church was added to the National Register of Historic Places in 1976.

== History ==
The original church property was purchased by Bishop Francis Kenrick in 1848 while the Wilmington area was part of the Diocese of Philadelphia. On October 31, 1858, the church was consecrated by Bishop John Nepomucene Neumann of Philadelphia. Later, the Catholic Diocese of Wilmington was formed March 3, 1868, and comprised what is known as the Delmarva Peninsula: the State of Delaware, nine eastern counties of Maryland, and two counties of Virginia east of Chesapeake Bay. Patrick Reilly was the first pastor of the parish. The church is a brick building trimmed in limestone and measuring about 100 feet long and 60 feet wide. The front facade features three brick towers; two corner ones are set diagonally, with onion-shaped domes topped with crosses and the center square tower (built 1881), now used as a belfry, has arched louvered openings. The dome on the center tower replaced an original wooden belfry and smaller dome destroyed by fire in March 1966. The parochial Catholic school, St. Mary's, was built on the adjacent property in 1866. St. Mary's parish became part of the Catholic Diocese of Wilmington at its inception in 1868.

Originally incorporated as "St. Mary’s Catholic Church" in 1877, the name of the church was changed when it was reincorporated in 1894 and became incorporated as "Church of St. Mary of the Immaculate Conception."

Bishop Neumann was beatified during the Second Vatican Council on October 13, 1963, and was canonized on June 19, 1977 by Pope Paul VI. In commemoration of his canonization, the parish secured a life-sized image of the new saint from the well-known local sculptor Charles Parks. The small, close-knit, racially mixed parish continues to be an oasis of faith on the East Side of the city.
