= St. Hedwig's Roman Catholic Church =

Historic church in Delaware, United States

- U.S. National Register of Historic Places
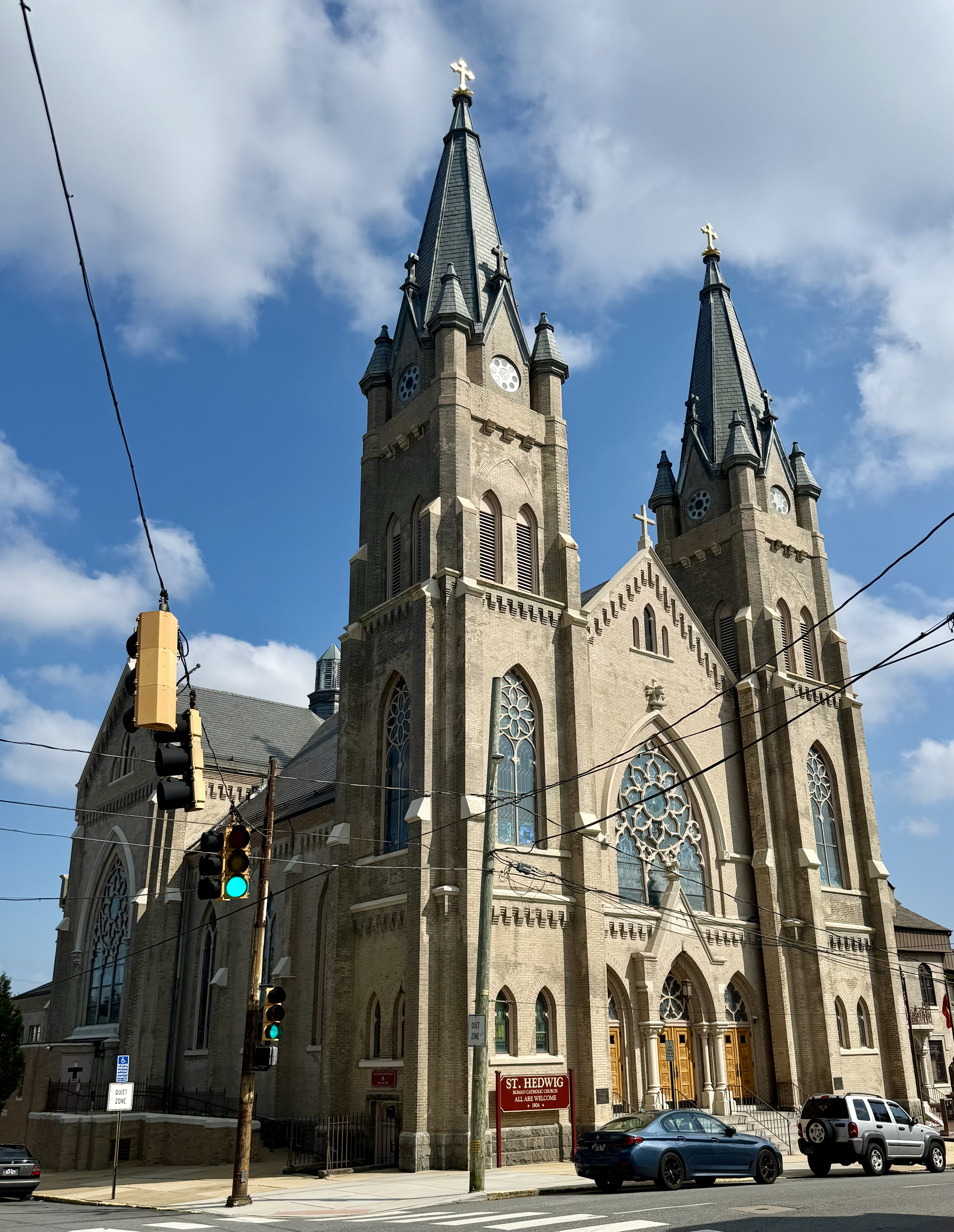
- Saint Hedwig's in 2025

- Location within Delaware Location within the United States
- Location: Linden and S. Harrison Sts., Wilmington, Delaware
- Coordinates: 39°44′25″N 75°33′58″W
- Area: 0.3 acres (0.12 ha)
- Built: 1904
- Architect: Brilmaier, A.
- Architectural style: Gothic Revival
- NRHP reference No.: 82001024
- Added to NRHP: November 12, 1982

St. Hedwig's Roman Catholic Church is a historic Roman Catholic church located at Linden and South Harrison streets in Wilmington, New Castle County, Delaware. St. Hedwig's serves as the only architecturally visible anchor or centerpiece for the Wilmington Polish community. The parish operated St. Hedwig's High School from 1960 to the 1970s. It was built in 1904, and is a cruciform shaped church constructed of soft gray brick (concrete block with brick veneer) with details in limestone. It is in the late Gothic Revival style. The front facade features a set of three double doors flanked by 80' spires terminating in cross gable spires. It was added to the National Register of Historic Places in 1982.

== History ==
Polish settlers first began to arrive in Wilmington about 1880. Initially the religious needs of the Catholic immigrants were met by German Benedictines at Sacred Heart Parish on Tenth Street, where a separate Mass was said for them starting in 1887. That same year, the Poles organized the St. Joseph's Society. A parish was formed, attended by the Benedictines. In 1896, upon the recommendation of Archbishop Michael Corrigan of New York, Father John S. Gulcz was appointed the first resident pastor. Gulcz was born in Poznan, Poland and came from New York to serve the Polish community of Wilmington. He set about organizing the construction of a new church building to replace the small one established by the Benedictines.

In the early twentieth century the Felician Sisters oversaw the education of over 500 pupils in the parish school.

In 1956, the parish began the annual May Polish Festival.

== Architecture ==
The church was designed by Brilmaier & Sons of Milwaukee, whose work in Brooklyn, Gulcz had admired. Built in 1904, it is in the late Gothic Revival style. The building has a cruciform shape and is constructed of soft gray brick (concrete block with brick veneer) with details in limestone. The front facade features a set of three double doors flanked by 80' spires terminating in cross gable spires. The only church in the state of Delaware with twin towers, it was, upon completion, the largest Catholic church in Wilmington.

== Gallery ==
c.1914

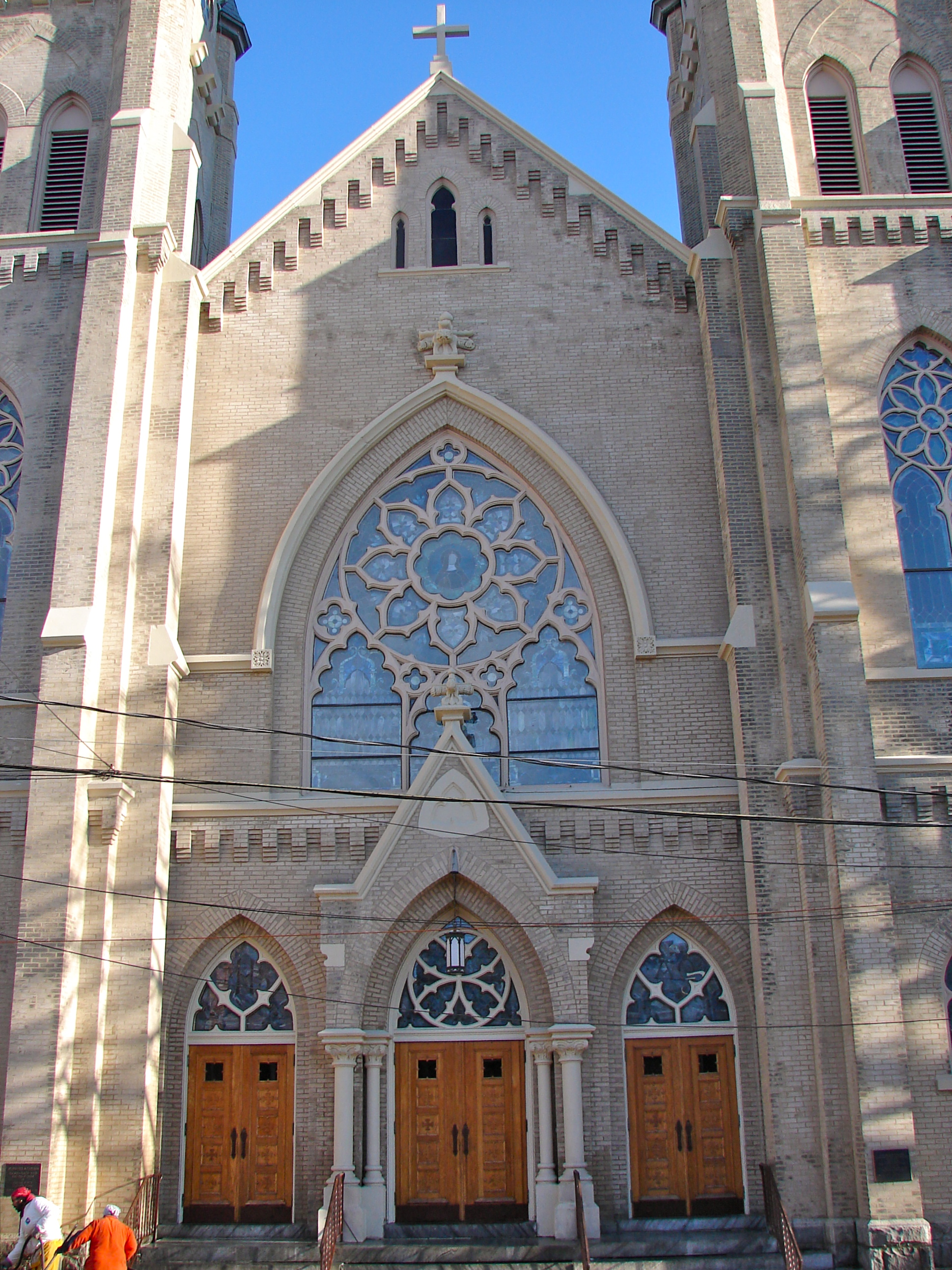
Entrance detail, November 2010
