= Cathedral of Saint Peter (Wilmington, Delaware) =

Historic church in Delaware, United States

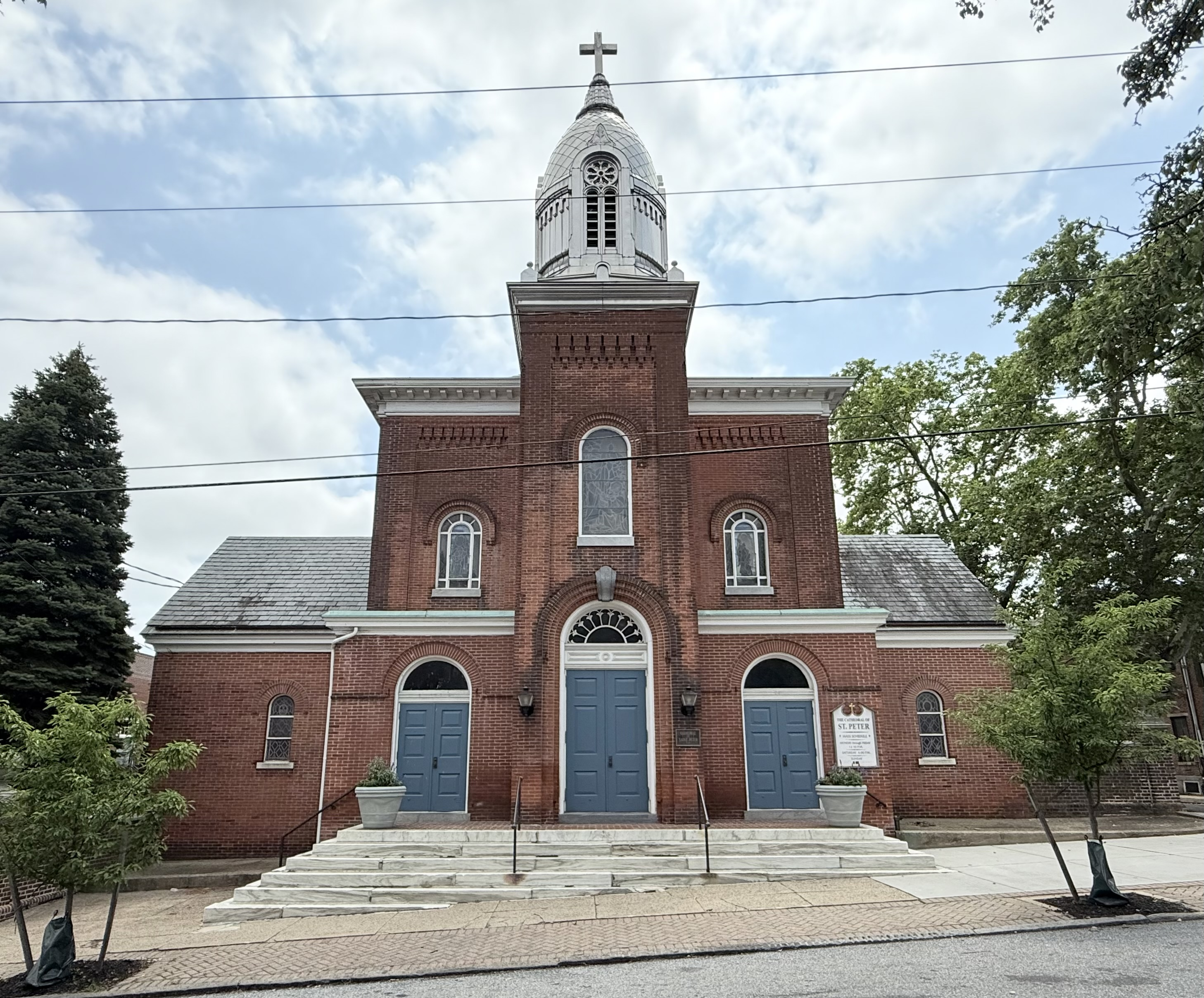
- Cathedral of Saint Peter in 2025
- Cathedral of Saint Peter
- 39°44′34″N 75°33′12″W
- Location: West 6th Street; Wilmington, Delaware
- Country: United States
- Denomination: Roman Catholic Church
- Website: www.cathedralofstpeter.com

History
- Founded: 1869
- Consecrated: 1905

Architecture
- Architect: Pierre Bauduy
- Style: Romanesque Revival
- Completed: 1818

Specifications
- Length: 60 feet (18 m)
- Width: 30 feet (9.1 m)
- Materials: Brick

Administration
- Diocese: Wilmington

Clergy
- Bishop: Most Rev. William Edward Koenig
- Rector: Rev. Joseph W. McQuaide
- Cathedral of Saint Peter
- U.S. Historic district – Contributing property
- Part of: Quaker Hill Historic District (ID79000635 and #85003221)
- Added to NRHP: December 19, 1985

The Cathedral of Saint Peter is the mother church of the Roman Catholic Diocese of Wilmington in the United States. It is Located on West 6th Street in Wilmington, Delaware. The cathedral church, rectory, convent and school building are contributing properties in the Quaker Hill Historic District, listed on the National Register of Historic Places.

== History ==
=== St. Peter's Church ===
At the beginning of the 19th century, Catholics in Wilmington did not have a parish with its own priest. Visiting priests would celebrate masses in private homes in the community. Reverend Patrick Kenny in 1816 leased land on Hanover (Sixth) and West Streets to construct the first Catholic church in Wilmington.Kenny hired Pierre Bauduy, the planner of the Wilmington town hall, to design the new building. The church cornerstone was laid in 1816; it was a 30- by 40-foot (9.1- by 12-meter) Romanesque-style brick building.

St. Peter's Church was dedicated on September 12, 1818, with the first mass celebrated by Kenny the next day. In 1829, the congregation installed a bell tower on the church and expanded the structure to its current length of 60 feet (18 m).

=== St. Peter's Pro-cathedral ===
In 1868, Pope Pius IX erected the Diocese of Wilmington. This action prompted the new diocese to prepare St. Peter's for consecration as a cathedral. Starting in 1870, the diocese added frescoes, a marble baptistery, three altars, a chancel railing, a barrel-domed roof, and a bishop's cathedra to the church. In 1900, the diocese installed a series of stained glass windows to the church.

When the church upgrades were finished in 1905, St. Peter's was ready to be consecrated as a cathedral. Archbishop Diomede Falconio, the apostolic delegate to the United States, traveled to Wilmington to perform the ceremony. However, he discovered that St. Peter's was joined to a rectory and a school. According to Vatican policies, a cathedral had to be a free-standing building. Falconio instead designated Saint Peter's as a pro-cathedral, a church serving temporarily as a cathedral.

=== St. Peter's Cathedral ===
After the diocese removed the school and rectory from the cathedral building in, 1925, St. Peter's was finally consecrated as a cathedral.

The diocese closed St. Peter's in 1981 to repair structural damage. They also wanted to modify the sanctuary to meet liturgical changes from the Second Vatican Council of the early 1960s. Contractors in 1991 added flying buttresses to the cathedral to reinforced the transept walls. They also raised the cathedral to insert a steel substructure under the pillars and choir loft.

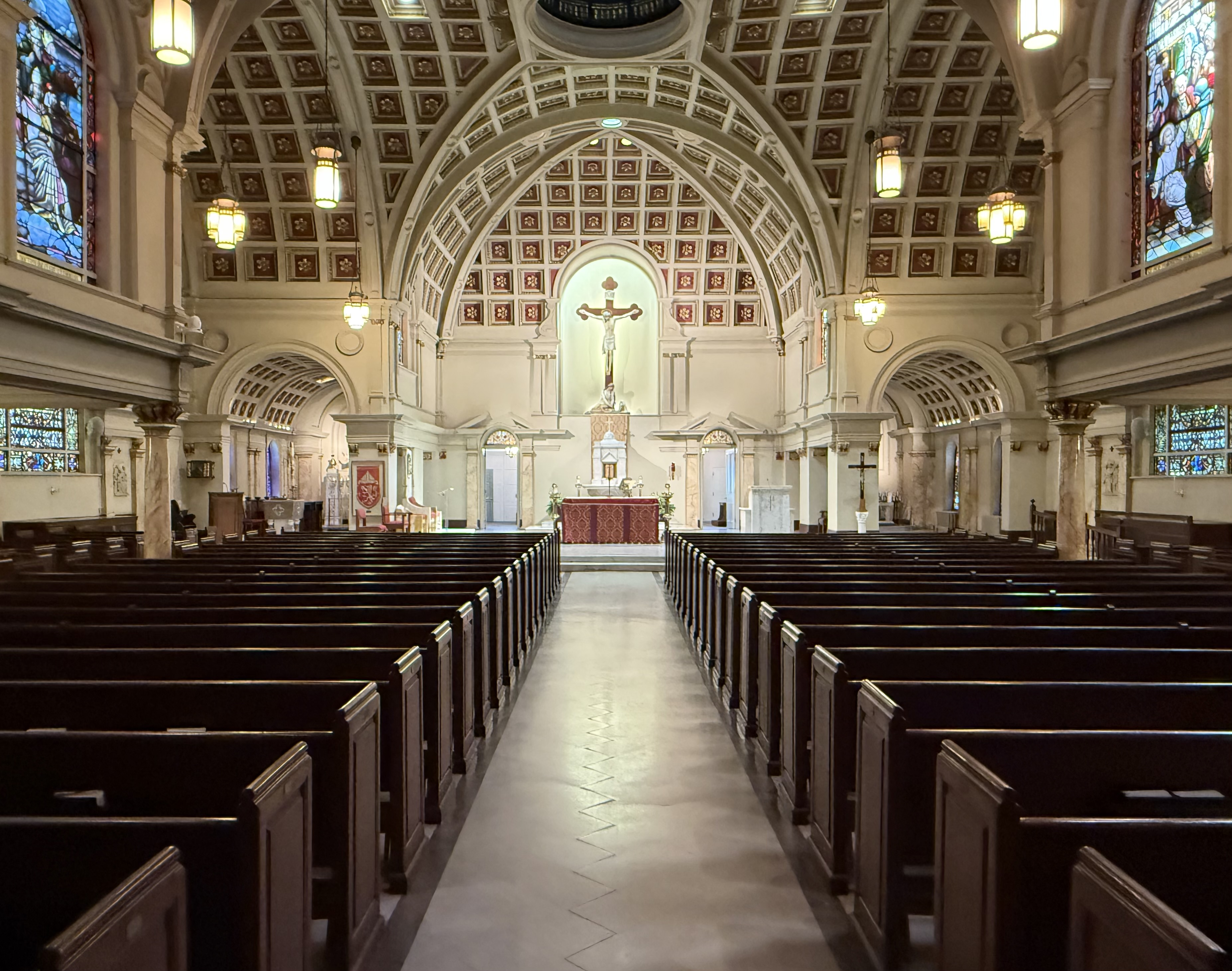
Interior, St. Peter's Cathedral (2025)

By 2007, new structural problems had arisen at St. Peter's. A plaster rosette had fallen from the ceiling into the pews and the roof was leaking. A grant from the Catholic Diocese Foundation allowed the diocese to replace the roof while keeping the cathedral open for worship. With the assistance of the cathedral rector, Reverend Joseph Cocucci, the diocese undertook further renovations at Saint Peter's:

- Moving the cathedra to the side of the sanctuary
- Moving the tabernacle to the center behind the altar. Two floor-to-ceiling support poles blocking the view of the tabernacle were removed.
- Creating shrine to Mary, mother of Jesus hat met accessibility requirements
- Moving the baptismal font near the cathedral entrance.

On November 22, 2007, in a Thanksgiving Day service at Saint Peter's, Bishop Michael Saltarelli thanked Cocucci "for putting the Blessed Sacrament in His proper place and for putting the bishop in his proper place."

== Stained glass windows ==
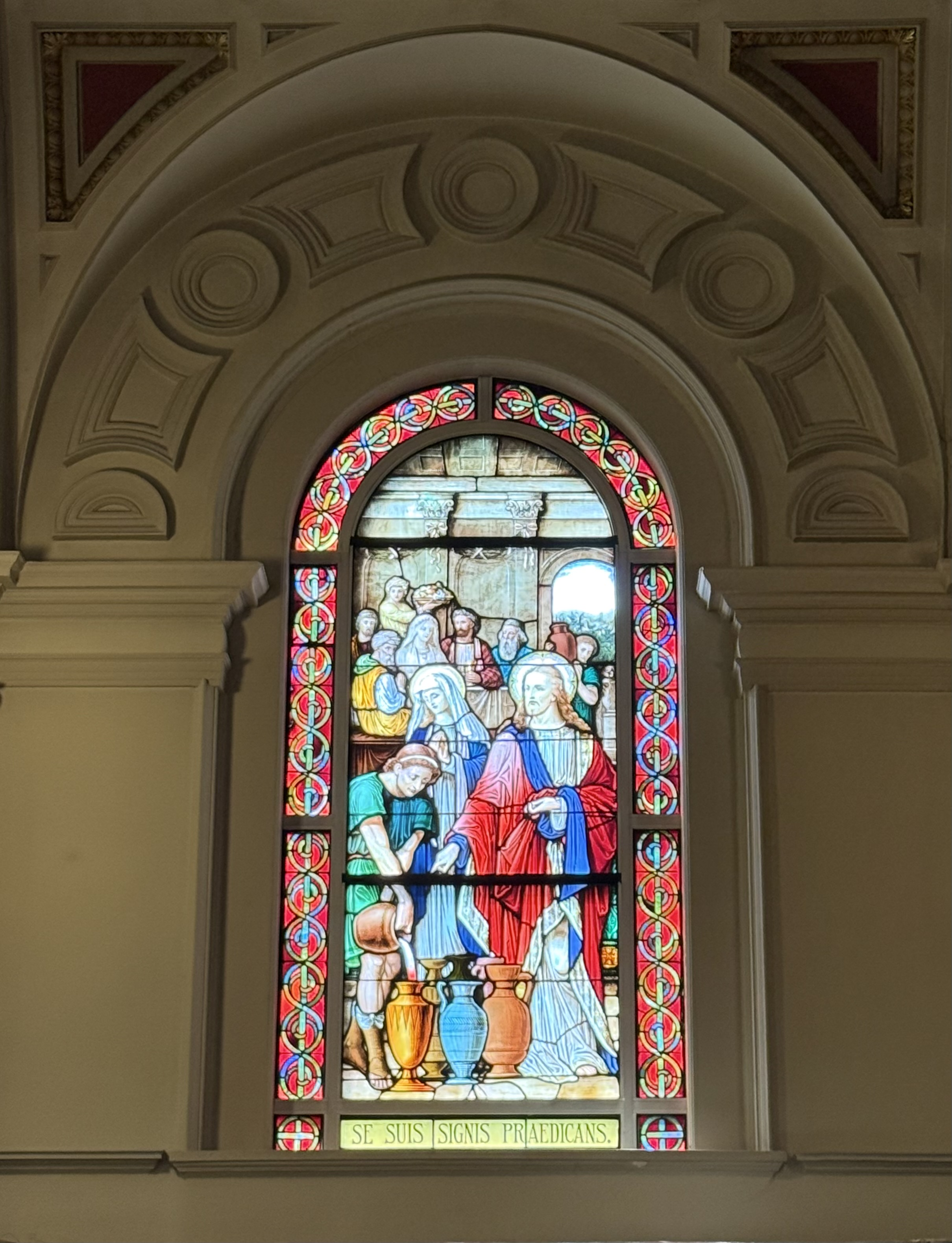
Miracle at the wedding at Cana stained glass window, St. Peter's Church (2025)

St. Peter's Cathedral contains 20 stained glass windows. They were possibly created by Franz Xavier Zettler, master glass painter in Munich to the Royal Court of Bavaria or by his pupil, Franz Mayer.

- The fall of Adam and Eve in the Garden of Eden
- The Nativity of Jesus in Bethlehem
- The death of Joseph, earthly father of Jesus
- Jesus with Joseph in the carpenter shop
- Joseph carrying the child Jesus
- Jesus talking with the doctors of law in the Jerusalem Temple
- The miracle at the wedding in Cana
- The Sermon on the Mount
- The Last Supper
- The Coronation of Mary into heaven
- The Assumption of Blessed Virgin Mary as Queen of heaven
- The Immaculate Conception
- St. Francis Xavier
- The virgins and martyrs of the church
- The Doctors of the Church
- Christ the King and Lord of the Universe
- The guardian angels
- St. Peter receiving the keys of the church
- The angel dome

== Rectors ==
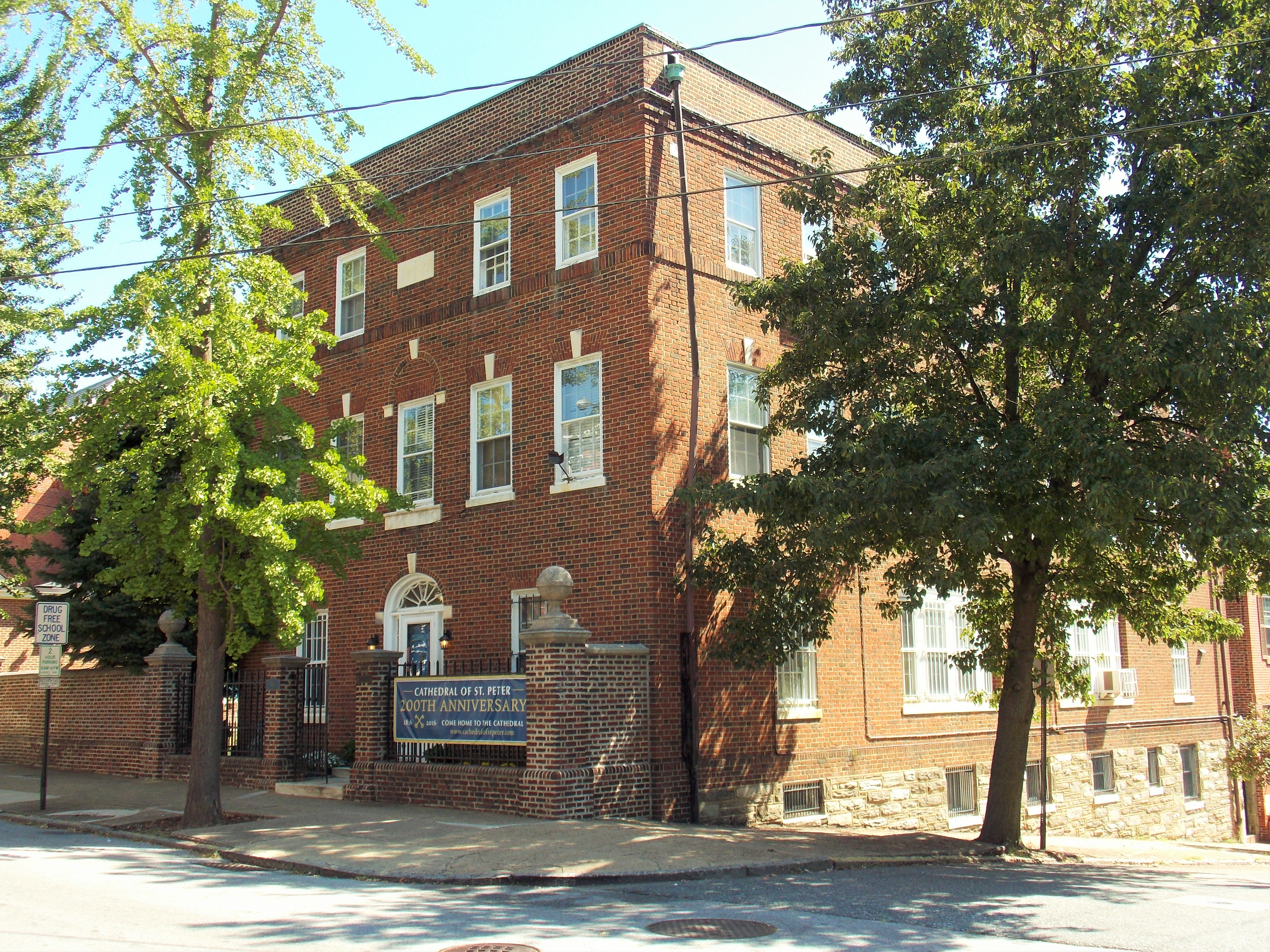
Rectory, St. Peter's Cathedral (2016)

St. Peter's has had 16 pastors and rectors since its founding as a parish in 1804:

=== Pastors of St. Peter's Church ===
1. Reverend Patrick Kenny (1804 – 1840)
2. Reverend Patrick Reilly (1840 – 1850)
3. Reverend Jeremiah O'Donohoe (1851 – 1855)
4. Reverend Patrick Prendergast (1855 – 1859)
5. Reverend Patrick O'Brien (1859 – 1867)
6. Reverend Matthew McGrane (1867 – 1868)
7. Most Reverend Thomas A. Becker (1868 – 1886)

=== Rectors of St. Peter's Pro-Cathedral and Cathedral ===
1. Monsignor John Lyons (1887 – 1916)
2. Monsignor John J. Dougherty (1916 – 1948)
3. Monsignor Joseph Sweeney (1949 – 1968)
4. Reverend John P. McLaughlin (1968 – 1977)
5. Reverend James E. Richardson (1977 – 1982)
6. Monsignor Paul J. Taggart (1982 – 1994)
7. Reverend William B. Kauffman (1995 – 2001)
8. Reverend Michael J. Carrier (2001 – 2005)
9. Reverend Joseph M. P. R. Cocucci (2006 – 2013)
10. Reverend Leonard R. Klein (2013 – 2019)
11. Reverend Joseph W. McQuaide (2020 – present)

== See also ==
- List of churches in the Roman Catholic Diocese of Wilmington
- List of Catholic cathedrals in the United States
- List of cathedrals in the United States
