= Cathedral of the Incarnation (Baltimore) =

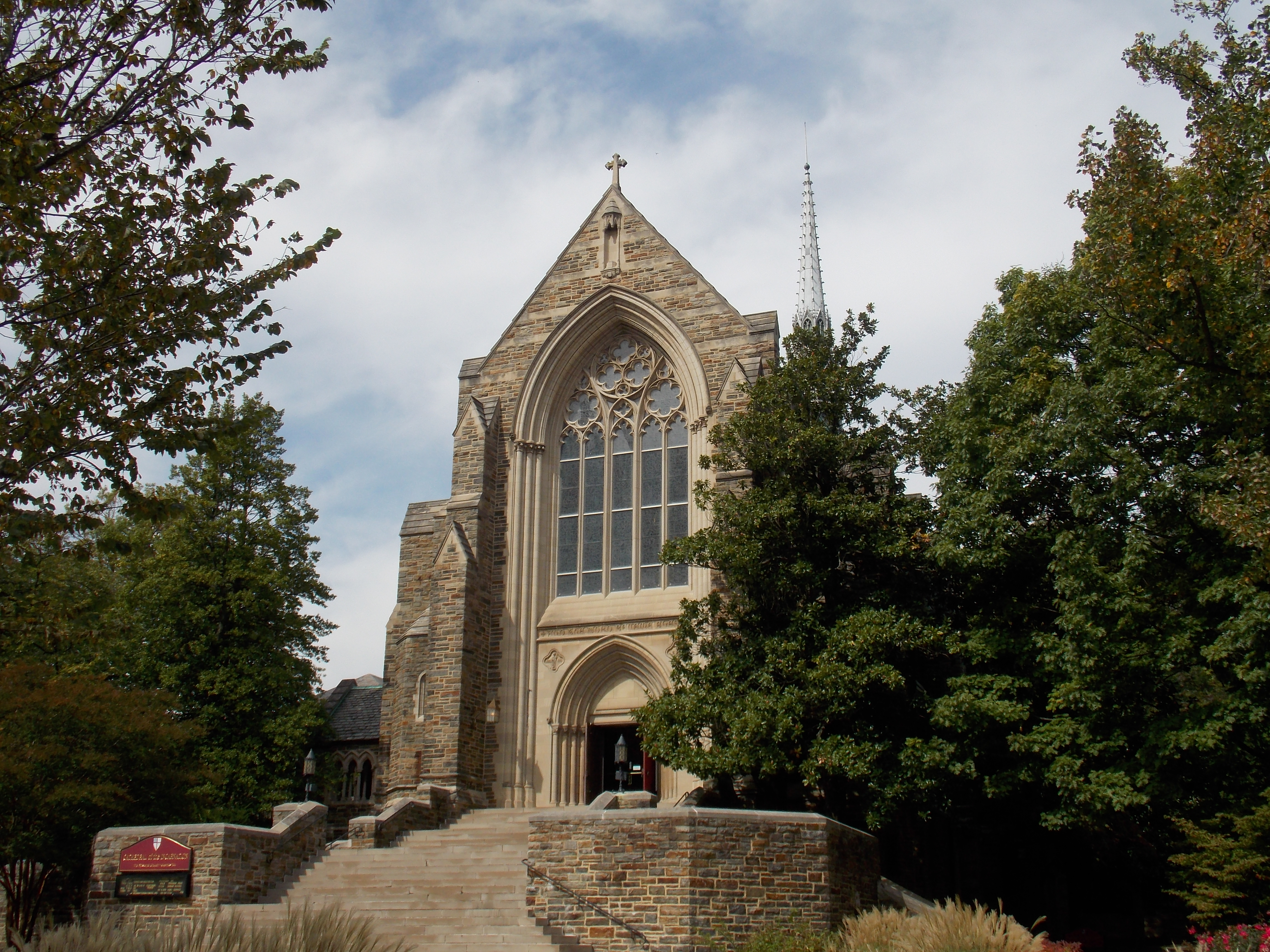

- Location within Maryland
- 39°19′55.76″N 76°36′59.98″W
- Location: 4 East University Parkway; Baltimore, Maryland
- Country: United States
- Denomination: Episcopal
- Website: incarnationbmore.org

History
- Status: Completed
- Founded: 1916
- Consecrated: November 6, 1955

Architecture
- Style: Gothic Revival
- Groundbreaking: 1909

Specifications
- Materials: Limestone

Administration
- Diocese: Diocese of Maryland

Clergy
- Bishop: Eugene Sutton
- Dean: Robert Boulter

The Cathedral of the Incarnation is an Episcopal cathedral in the Guilford neighborhood of Baltimore, Maryland, United States. It is the seat of the Diocese of Maryland.

The cathedral reported 912 members in 2023 and 490 members in 2025. Plate and pledge income for the congregation in 2025 was $612,651 with average Sunday attendance (ASA) of 190. This was a relative decrease from ASA of 268 persons reported in 2017.

== History ==
Discussions about building a cathedral in the Diocese of Maryland took place at least as far back as the years William Paret was the bishop (1885–1911). However, it was during the episcopate of John Gardner Murray that the cathedral was built. The so-called Synod Hall was the first constructed building in the planned complex and the congregation met in the undercroft beginning in 1911. The cornerstone for the Synod Hall proper was laid in 1920 and the first worship service was held in the new space in 1932. Plans for a cathedral complex and a separate larger cathedral were then abandoned, and the Synod Hall was redesignated as the cathedral. For the first 35 years it was known as a pro-cathedral. In 1943, the Cathedral of the Incarnation was first used for the installation ceremony of a bishop, with the ninth Bishop of Maryland. After the cathedral's construction debt was discharged, the Diocese of Maryland passed a resolution establishing the Cathedral of the Incarnation on February 1, 1955, and it was consecrated on November 6, 1955.

The Cathedral House, built in 1967, houses offices, meeting spaces, and Sunday School rooms.

== Gallery ==
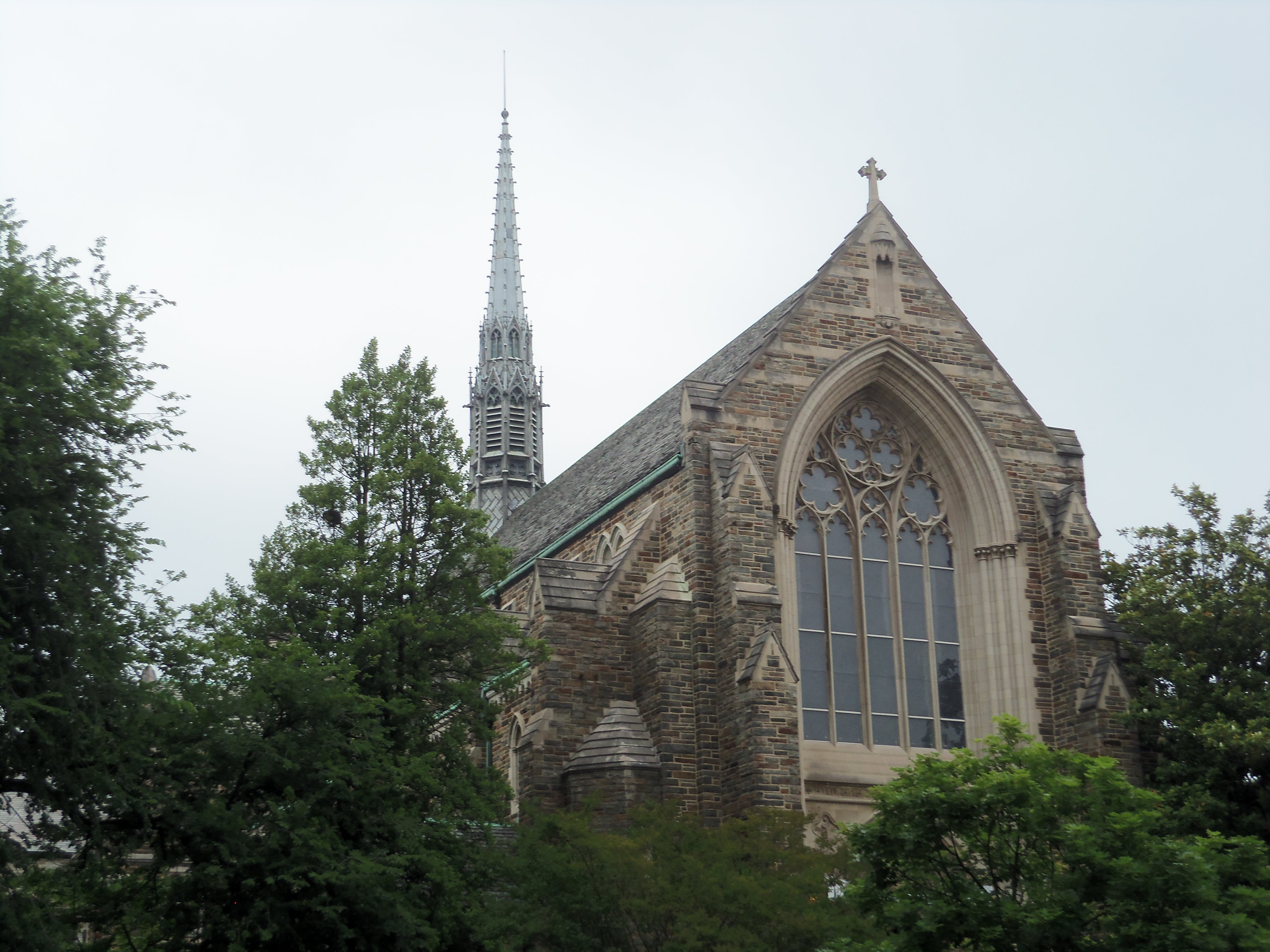
Cathedral façade and flèche

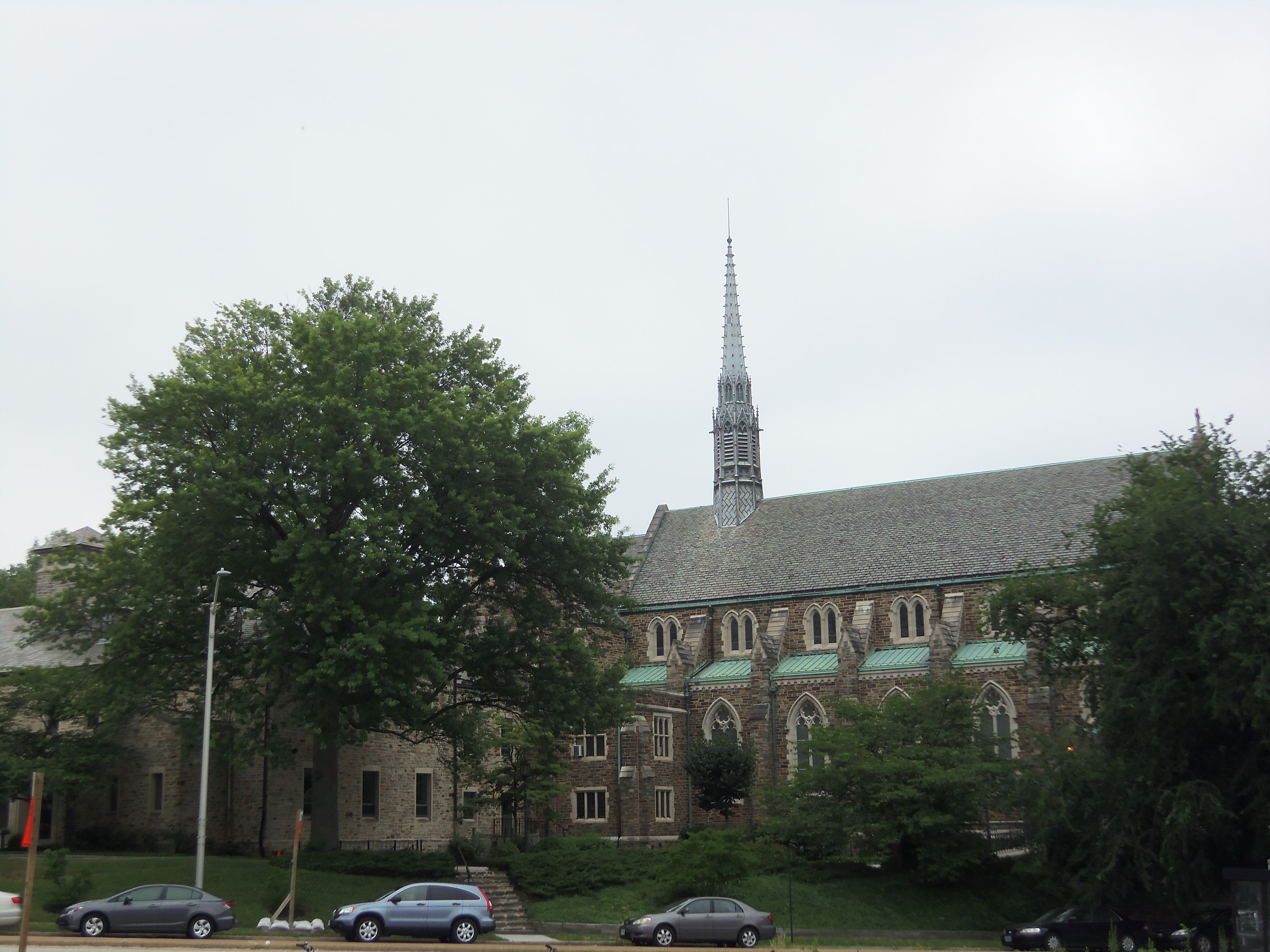
Cathedral, viewed from the west

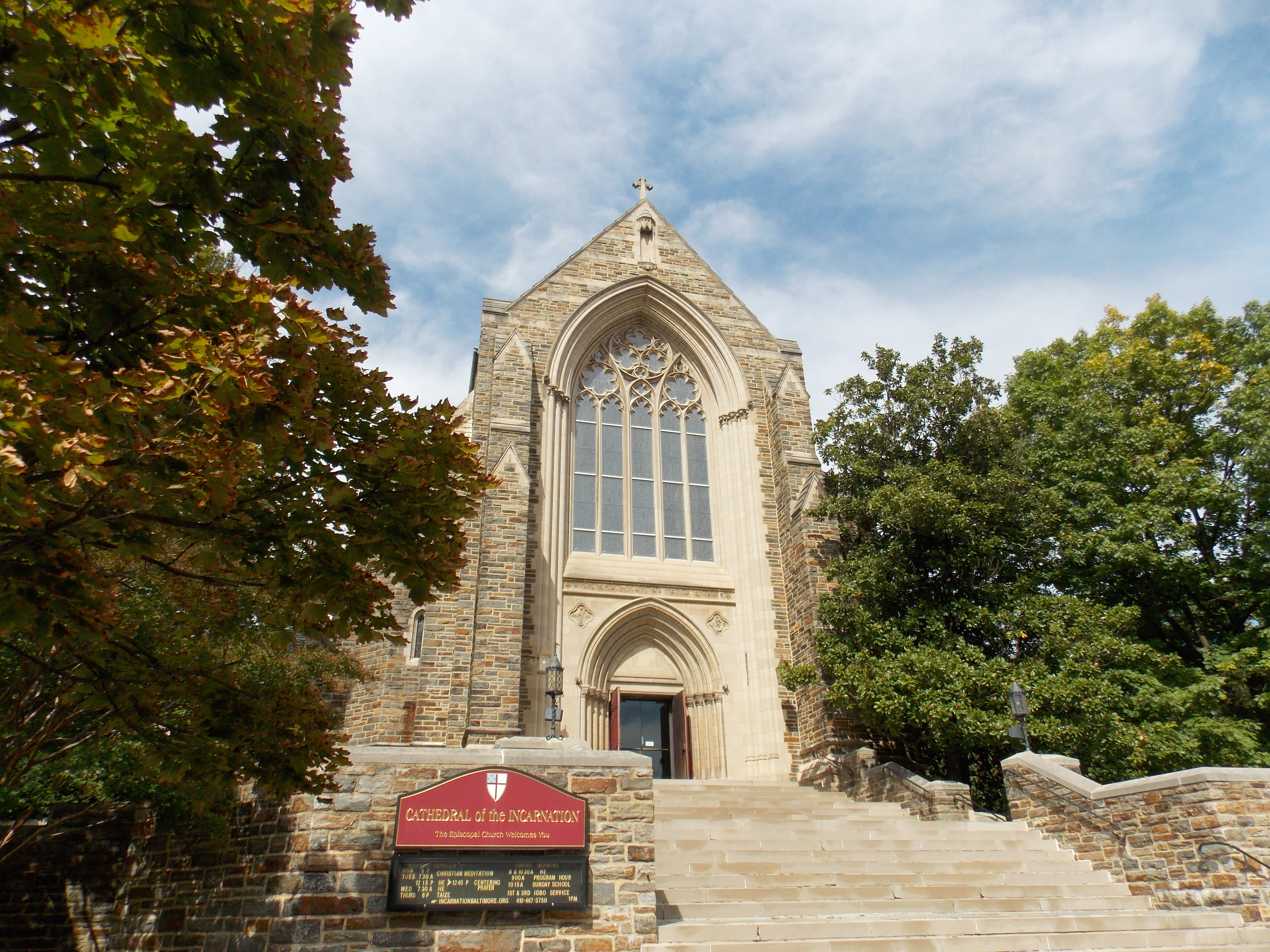
Facade and steps, from the south

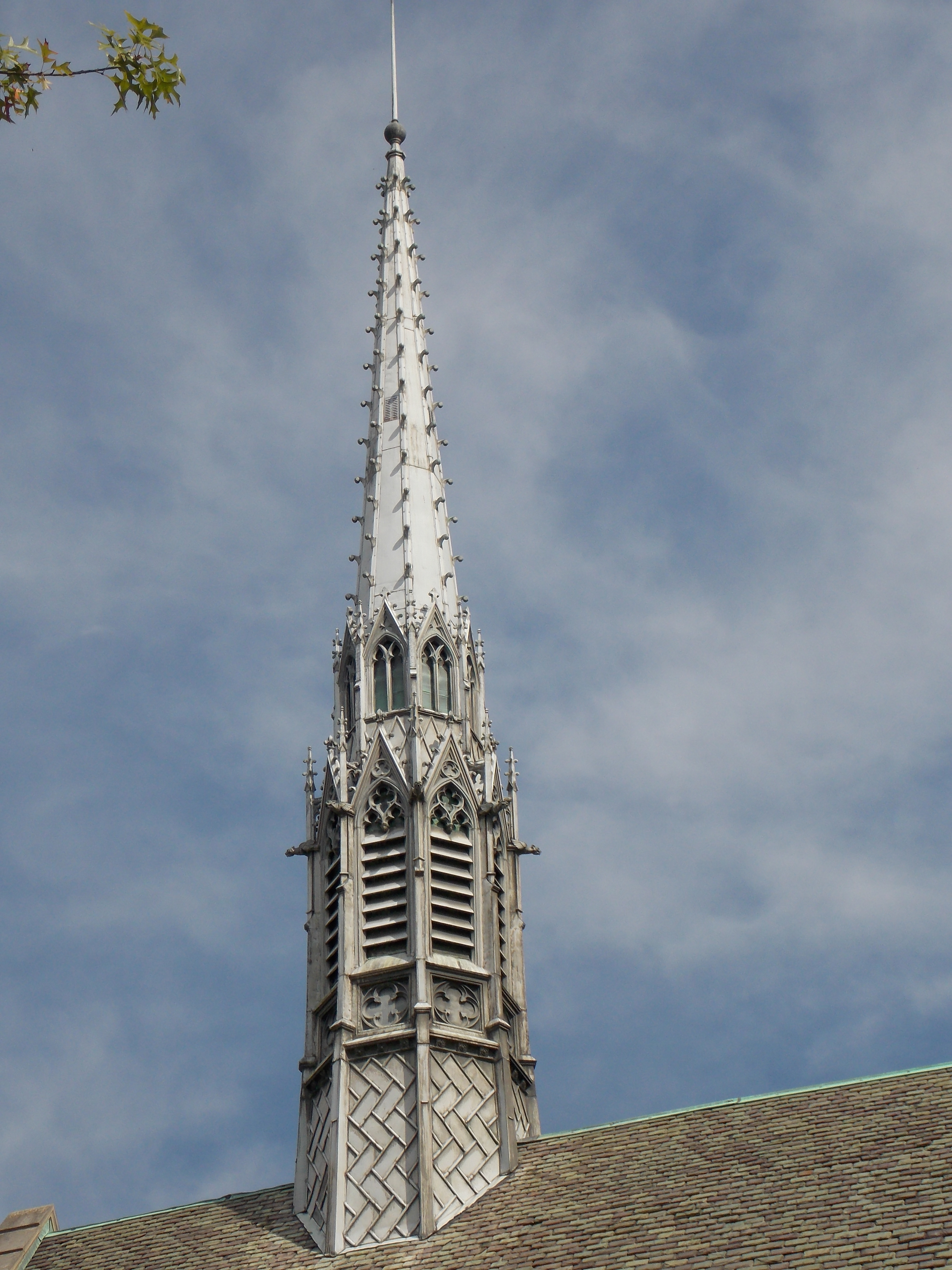
Flèche on the Cathedral of the Incarnation

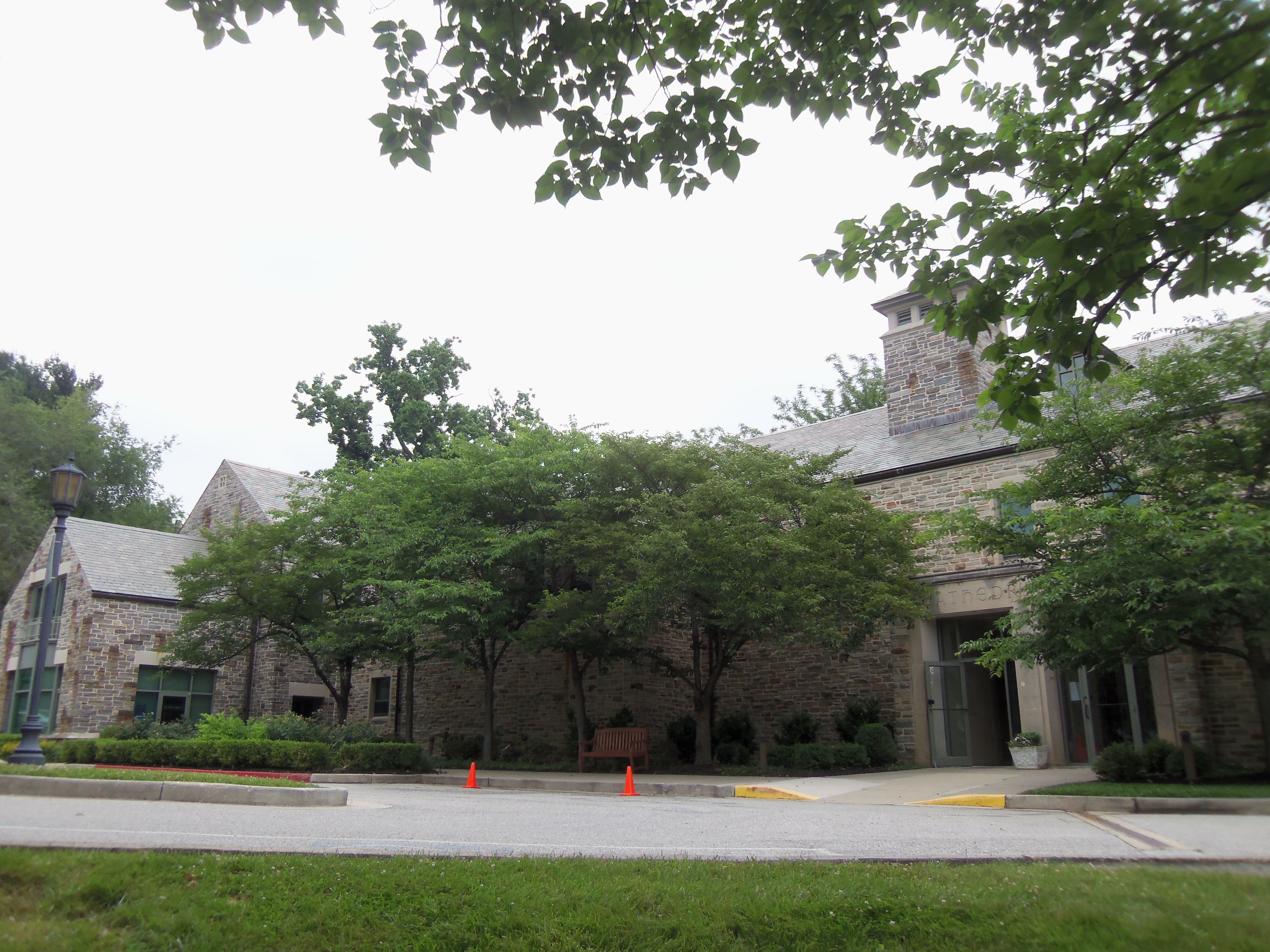
Cathedral House

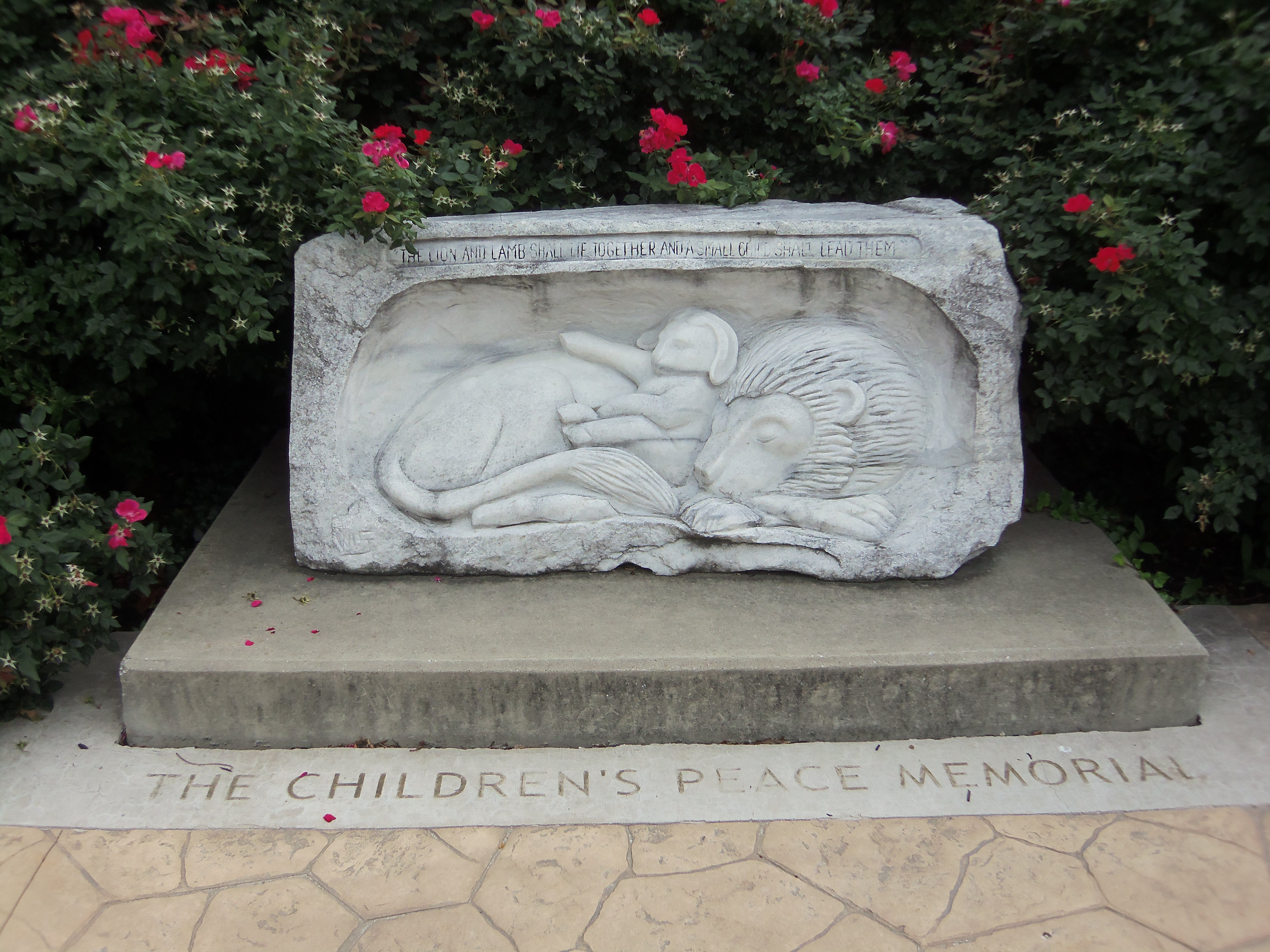
The Children's Peace Memorial

== See also ==
- List of the Episcopal cathedrals of the United States
- List of cathedrals in the United States
