= Edward T. Helfenstein =

American bishop (1865–1947)

The Right Reverend Edward Trail Helfenstein D.D.
- Bishop of Maryland
- Church: Episcopal Church
- Diocese: Maryland
- In office: 1929–1943
- Predecessor: John Gardner Murray
- Successor: Noble C. Powell
- Previous post: Coadjutor Bishop of Maryland (1926-1929)

Orders
- Ordination: March 9, 1890 by William Paret
- Consecration: December 28, 1926 by John Gardner Murray

Personal details
- Born: April 7, 1865 St. Louis, Missouri, United States
- Died: December 22, 1947 (aged 82) Maryland, United States
- Buried: Mount Olivet Cemetery (Frederick)
- Denomination: Anglican
- Parents: Cyrus Glonigan Helfenstein & Annie Elizabeth Trail
- Spouse: Grace Fenton Nelson

Edward Trail Helfenstein (April 7, 1865 – December 22, 1947) was the eighth bishop of the Episcopal Diocese of Maryland, serving in that capacity from 1929 to 1943.

== Early life and education ==
Helfenstein was born on April 7, 1865, in St. Louis, Missouri, the son of Cyrus Glonigan Helfenstein and Annie Elizabeth Trail. He was baptised in All Saints Church in Frederick, Maryland. He attended the Frederick Academy in Frederick, Maryland, and then the Episcopal High School in Alexandria, Virginia. He also studied for a time at the Johns Hopkins University and then graduated from Virginia Theological Seminary in 1889. He was also awarded an honorary Doctor of Divinity 1916 by Virginia Theological Seminary.

== Ordained ministry ==
Helfenstein was ordained deacon on March 19, 1889, by Bishop William Paret of Maryland and then became deacon-in-charge of Christ Church in Rock Spring, Maryland and Holy Cross Church in The Rocks Harford County, Maryland. He was ordained priest on March 9, 1890, in Emmanuel Church, Baltimore, also by Bishop William Paret. Between 1889 and 1890, he served as rector of Saint Mark's parish, covering Frederick and Washington counties. Afterwards he became rector of Saint John's Church in Ellicott City, Maryland, in 1900 and subsequently also rector of Saint Peter's Church in Ellicott City, Maryland, retaining both posts till 1920. He was then appointed Archdeacon of Maryland in 1920.

== Bishop ==
Helfenstein was elected Coadjutor Bishop of Maryland during a diocesan convention held in Baltimore in 1926. He was consecrated on December 28, 1926, by Presiding Bishop and Bishop of Maryland John Gardner Murray as chief consecrator. He succeeded Murray as diocesan upon his death on October 3, 1929. He retired on November 1, 1943, and died on December 22, 1947, after a brief illness.

Episcopal Church (USA) titles
Preceded by John Gardner Murray	Bishop of Maryland; 1929−1943	Succeeded by Noble Cilley Powell
