= David Leighton =

American bishop

The Right Reverend David Keller Leighton D.D.
- Bishop of Maryland
- Church: Episcopal Church
- Diocese: Maryland
- In office: 1972–1985
- Predecessor: Harry Lee Doll
- Successor: A. Theodore Eastman
- Previous post: Coadjutor Bishop of Maryland (1968-1972)

Orders
- Ordination: 1955
- Consecration: November 30, 1968 by John E. Hines

Personal details
- Born: Pittsburgh, Pennsylvania, United States
- Died: August 7, 2013 (aged 91) Sykesville, Maryland, United States
- Buried: St. Thomas Church (Owings Mills, Maryland)
- Denomination: Anglican
- Parents: Frank Kingsley Leighton & Irene Adele Keller
- Spouse: Carolyn Ruth Smith (m. 1945)
- Children: 3

David Keller Leighton, Sr. (January 22, 1922 – August 7, 2013) was the American bishop of the Episcopal Diocese of Maryland 1972–1985.

== Early life and education ==
Leighton was born in Pittsburgh, Pennsylvania on June 22, 1922, the son of Frank Kingsley Leighton (1876-1950) and Irene Adele Keller (1888-1976). He served in the United States Army Air Forces during World War II. On January 18, 1945, he married Carolyn Ruth Smith (1921-2014) and together they had three children. In 1947, Leighton graduated from Northwestern University and worked for General Motors. He then went to the Virginia Theological Seminary and was ordained a priest in 1955. In 1969 he was awarded an honorary Doctor of Divinity degree from Virginia Theological Seminary.

== Ordained ministry ==
After ordination in 1955, he became curate of Calvary Church in Pittsburgh, Pennsylvania and in 1956 he became rector of St Andrew's Church in Pittsburgh, Pennsylvania. Between 1959 and 1963, he served as rector of the Church of the Holy Nativity in Forest Park, Baltimore. He subsequently was a teacher of sacred studies at the St. Paul's School (Brooklandville, Maryland). Later, he became Archdeacon of Maryland, a post he retained till 1968.

== Episcopacy ==
In 1968, he was elected coadjutor bishop of the Diocese of Maryland and was consecrated on November 30, 1968, at Emmanuel Church, in Baltimore with Presiding Bishop John E. Hines as chief consecrator. He succeeded as diocesan bishop in January 1972. He was the first Bishop of Maryland to ordain the first woman to the priesthood in the Diocese of Maryland in 1977. Leighton retired in 1985. He died in Sykesville, Maryland.

== Notes ==
Episcopal Church (USA) titles
| Preceded by Harry Lee Doll | Bishop of Maryland; 1972−1985 | Succeeded by Albert Theodore Eastman |
