= St. John's Episcopal Church, Zion Parish =

Historic church in Prince George's County, Maryland, US

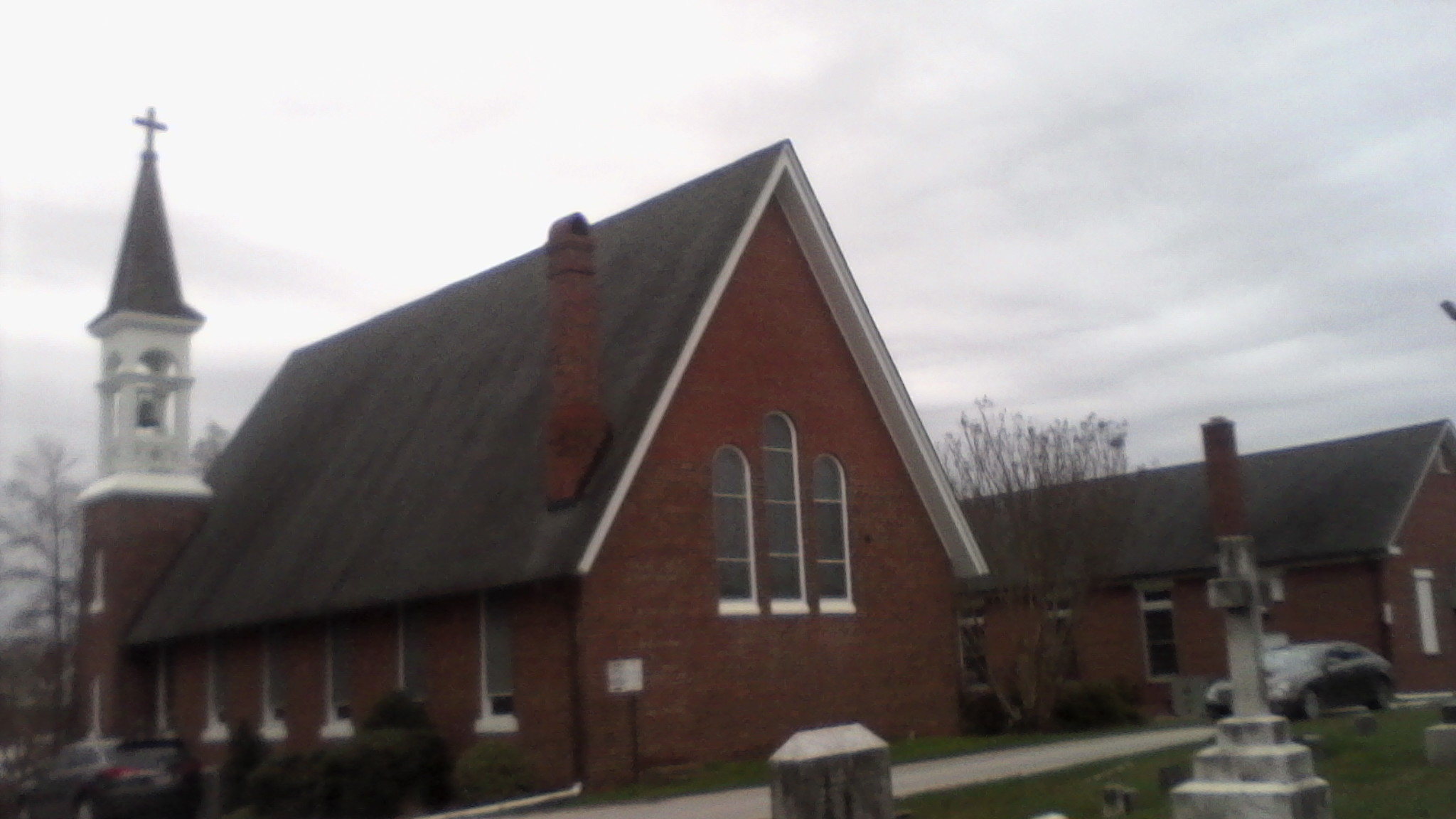

Religion
- Affiliation: Episcopal
- District: Episcopal Diocese of Washington
- Leadership: Rev. Joseph M. Constant
- Year consecrated: 1878

Location
- Location: 11040 Baltimore Ave; Greenbelt, Maryland 20705
- Interactive map of St. John's Episcopal Church, Zion Parish
- Coordinates: 39°02′06″N 76°54′30″W

Architecture
- Style: Gothic Revival
- Completed: 1877
- Materials: brick, wood shingle roof

Website
- Official website

St. John's Episcopal Church, Zion Parish in Beltsville, Maryland, United States, is a historic place of worship whose congregation dates back more than two centuries.

== History and architecture ==
The Episcopal Diocese of Maryland established the parish in 1811 and it first held services in Old Paint Branch Chapel in Calverton, Maryland near the border between Prince George's County, Maryland and Montgomery County, Maryland. Between 1825 and 1847, the congregation worshiped in Vansville, Maryland, also in Prince George's County. The wooden structures used by the congregation in the 19th century were destroyed by fire, storm, tornado and lightning.

Two other historic once rural parishes have similar names. One, Zion Episcopal Church, was established in Urbana in Frederick County, Maryland in 1802 and burned down in 1961, although the ruins and cemetery remain as a historic site and the church is expected to be rebuilt. Another, known as St. Mark's Paint Branch Chapel, was built in 1774 in what became Silver Spring in Montgomery County, Maryland, rebuilt in 1835 and ultimately removed in 1877 and replaced by a modern structure circa 1980.

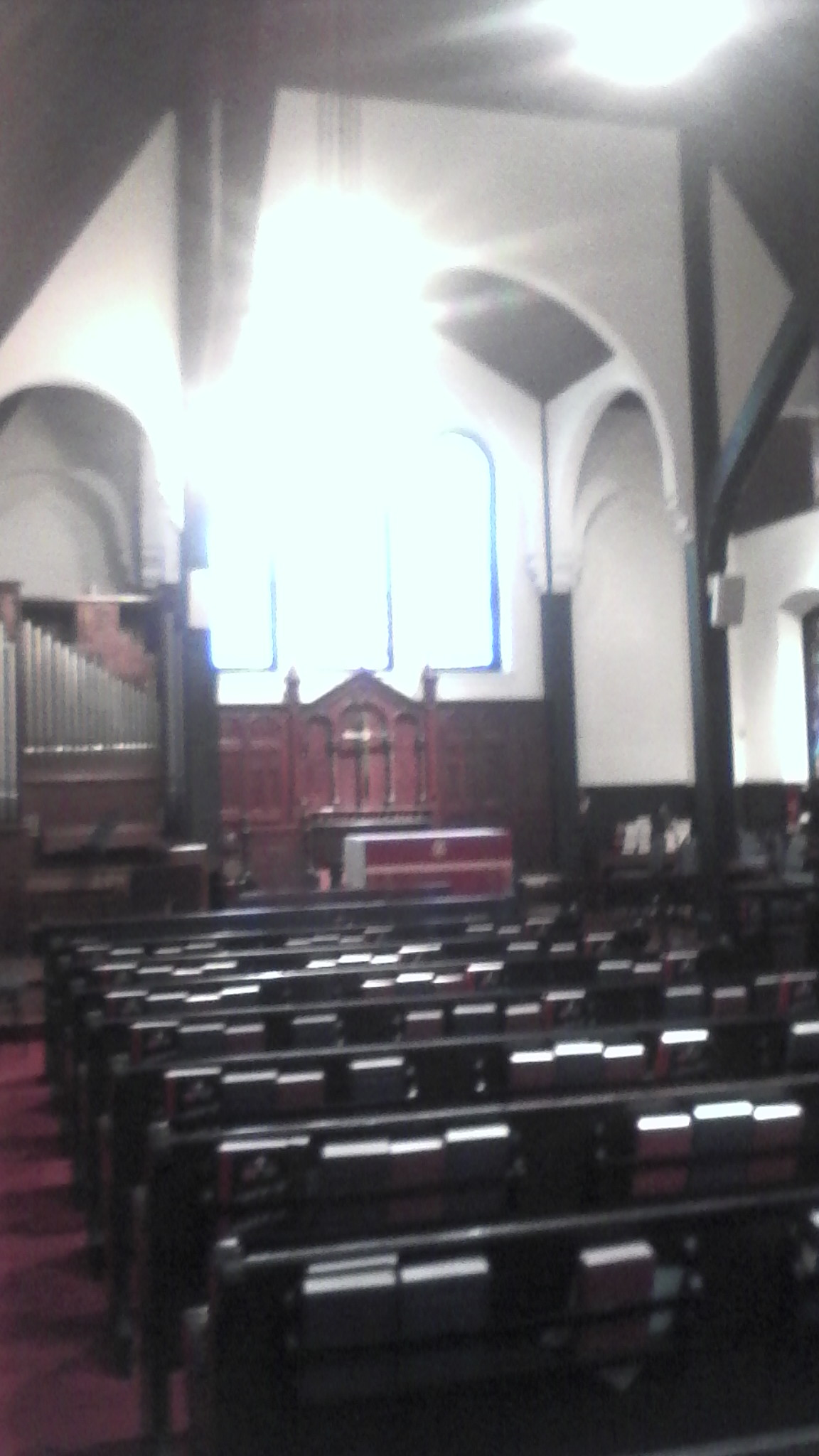
Interior from Nave toward Altar

In 1855, the St. John's Zion Parish vestry received 1.5 acres along the Baltimore Pike from innkeeper John W. Brown (whose establishment was 1.25 miles south) and his wife, and the property eventually increased to about 3 acres. A frame building was then erected, and soon a cemetery. Rev. William Pinkney, then the rector of St. Matthew's Parish in Hyattsville since 1836, spoke during the 1857 consecration and took care of parishioners during their first year at this location. During the American Civil War, Union artillery forces occupied the strategic site on a hill overlooking historic Route 1. However, it was destroyed by fire in 1868 and rebuilt in wood, only to be again destroyed by a severe storm in 1874.

The current brick building with a steep pitched roof, round-arched stained glass windows and bell tower was erected in 1877 at the urging of its former rector, and on April 22, 1878 was consecrated by Rt. Rev. William Pinkney, who had by then risen to become suffragan Episcopal Bishop of Maryland and who would become the diocesan bishop upon the death of the disabled Rt. Rev. William Wittingham the following year. Despite another fire in 1972 which required extensive restoration, its architectural integrity and status as a local landmark led to its inclusion among the county's historic sites, as shown by an exterior plaque. The parish house was added in 1924 and connected by a (later enclosed) breezeway with the church. An office wing in a harmonious style was added to the other side of the parish house in 1991.

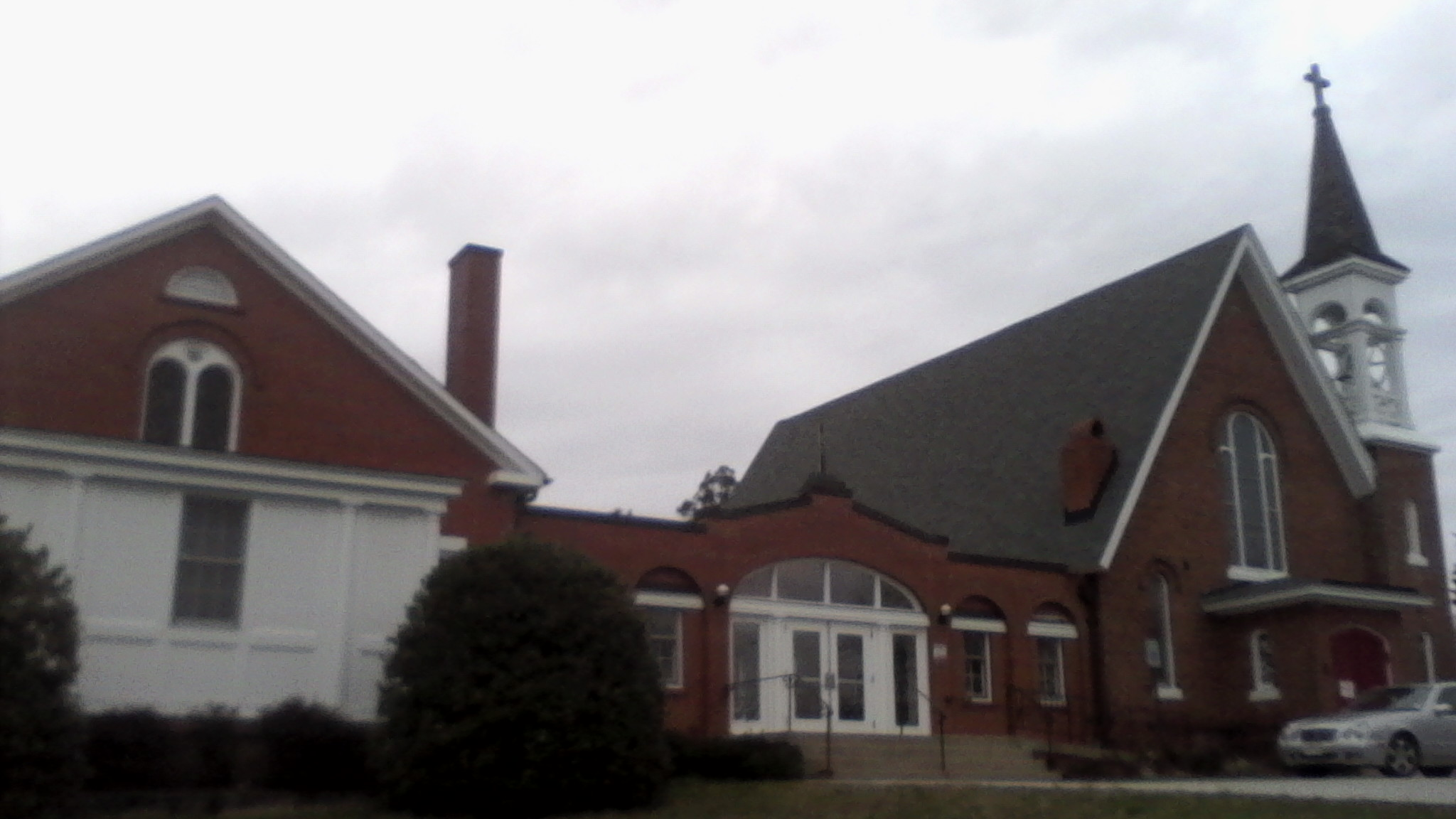
parish hall at left; church at right

Brigadier General Rezin Beall is buried in the church's cemetery.

== Current status ==
St. John's Episcopal Church is an active parish in the Episcopal Diocese of Washington. Rev. Joseph M. Constant, who in 2005 founded the Haiti Micah Project while working for the Presiding Bishop of the Episcopal Church, was installed as rector in 2015.

== See also ==
- Episcopal Diocese of Washington
