= Noble C. Powell =

American bishop (1891–1968)

The Right Reverend Noble Cilley Powell D.D.
- Bishop of Maryland
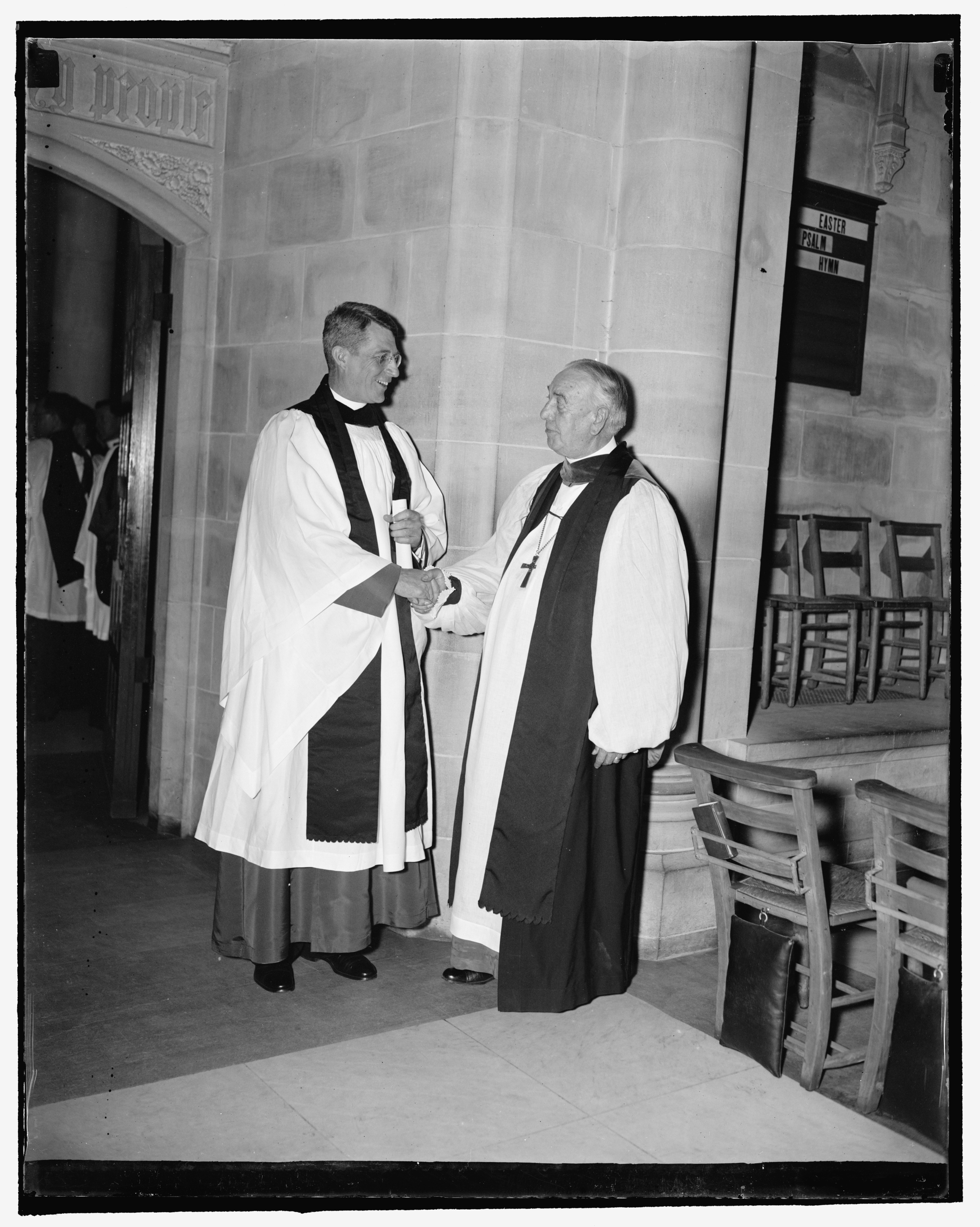
- Church: Episcopal Church
- Diocese: Maryland
- In office: 1943–1963
- Predecessor: Edward T. Helfenstein
- Successor: Harry Lee Doll
- Previous post: Coadjutor Bishop of Maryland (1941-1943)

Orders
- Ordination: January 9, 1921 by William Cabell Brown
- Consecration: October 17, 1941 by Henry St. George Tucker

Personal details
- Born: October 27, 1891 Lowndesboro, Alabama, United States
- Died: November 28, 1968 (aged 77) Baltimore, Maryland, United States
- Buried: St. Thomas Church (Owings Mills, Maryland)
- Denomination: Anglican
- Parents: Benjamin Shelley Powell & Mary Irving Whitman
- Spouse: Mary Wilkins Rustin
- Children: 2
- Education: University of Virginia

Noble Cilley Powell (October 27, 1891 – November 28, 1968) was a prominent leader in the Episcopal Church in the United States of America, who served as the ninth Bishop of Maryland.

== Early life and education ==
Powell was born on October 27, 1891, in Lowndesboro, Alabama, the son of Benjamin Shelley (also Shell) Powell (1859–1928) and Mary "Mamie" Irving Whitman (1857–1942). He was educated at the Alabama Polytechnic Institute between 1911 and 1915 and then at the University of Virginia between 1915 and 1917. He then studied at the Virginia Theological Seminary and graduated in 1920 with a Bachelor of Divinity. He was awarded an honorary Doctor of Divinity in 1930 by Virginia Theological Seminary, and another by Sewanee: The University of the South in 1942 and another from Washington College in 1957.

== Ordained ministry ==
Powell was ordained deacon in 1920, and priest on January 9, 1921, by Bishop William Cabell Brown of Virginia. From 1920 to 1931 he served as rector of St Paul's Memorial Church, in Charlottesville, Virginia, and also ministered during that period to students at the University of Virginia, who knew him as "Parson Powell." In 1931 he became rector of Emmanuel Church, Baltimore. He became Dean of Washington National Cathedral and warden of the College of Preachers in 1937.

== Episcopacy ==
In 1941 he was elected Coadjutor Bishop of Maryland and was consecrated on October 17, 1941, with Presiding Bishop Henry St. George Tucker as chief consecrator. He then succeeded Edward T. Helfenstein as diocesan in 1943, and was installed in the Cathedral of the Incarnation on November 21, 1943. He served as bishop of Maryland until 1963, when he was succeeded by Harry Lee Doll. Bishop Powell was married to Mary Wilkins Rustin (1901–1974) in 1924. They had two sons, Philip and Thomas.

Episcopal Church (USA) titles
Preceded by George C. F. Bratenahl	Dean of Washington National Cathedral; 1937–1941	Succeeded by Zebarney T. Phillips
Preceded by Edward Trail Helfenstein	Bishop of Maryland; 1943–1963	Succeeded by Harry Lee Doll
