= A. Theodore Eastman =

American Episcopal bishop

The Right Reverend Albert Theodore Eastman D.D., L H.D.
- Bishop of Maryland
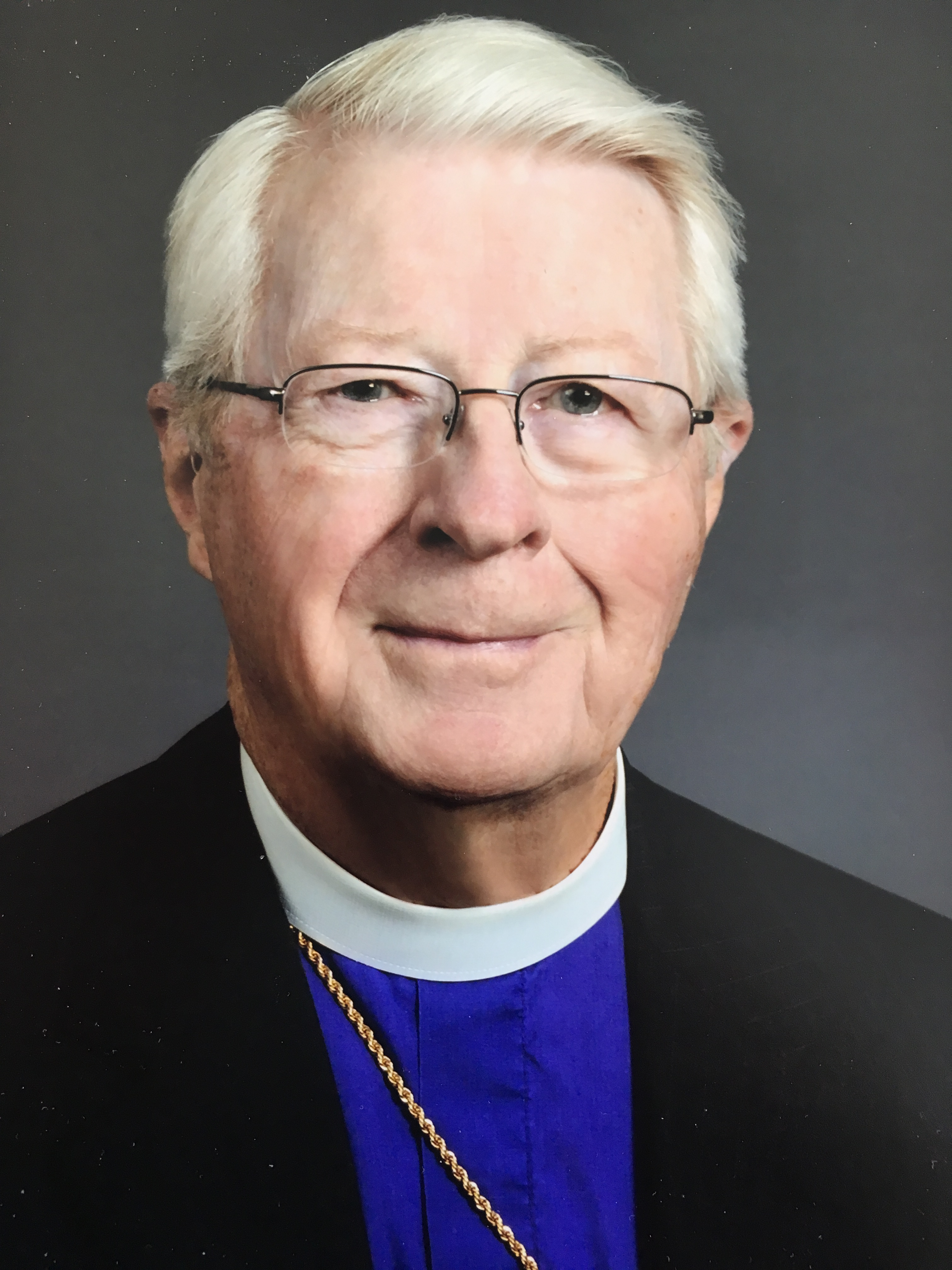
- Church: Episcopal Church
- Diocese: Maryland
- In office: 1986–1994
- Predecessor: David Leighton
- Successor: Robert W. Ihloff
- Previous post: Coadjutor Bishop of Maryland (1982-1986)

Orders
- Ordination: January 25, 1954 by Karl M. Block
- Consecration: June 26, 1982 by John Allin

Personal details
- Born: November 20, 1928 San Mateo, California, United States
- Died: April 26, 2018 (aged 89) Arlington, Virginia, United States
- Denomination: Anglican
- Parents: Carl John Eastman & Inette Nordeen
- Spouse: Sarah Virginia Tice (m. June 13, 1953)
- Children: Sarah Eastman Reks, Anne Eastman Rosenbaum, Andrew Tice Eastman

Albert Theodore "Ted" Eastman (November 20, 1928 – April 26, 2018) was an American prelate who served as the twelfth Bishop of Maryland from 1986 to 1994.

== Early life and education ==
Eastman was born on November 20, 1928, in San Mateo, California, the son of Carl John Eastman and Inette Nordeen, children of immigrants from Sweden. He attended public school in Burlingame, California. He studied at Haverford College from where he graduated with a Bachelor of Arts in 1950. He then graduated with a Master of Divinity from Virginia Theological Seminary in 1953. The latter also awarded him an honorary Doctor of Divinity in 1983. He also received a Doctor of Humane Letters from Episcopal Theological Seminary in 1982 and another Doctor of Divinity from St. Mary's Seminary and University in 1994.

== Ordained ministry ==
Eastman was ordained deacon on July 15, 1953, in Grace Cathedral, San Francisco, by Henry H. Shires, Suffragan Bishop of California. He was then ordained priest on January 25, 1954, by Karl M. Block, Diocesan Bishop of California. In 1953 he became vicar of Trinity Church in Gonzales, California, and concurrently served as chaplain of Soledad State Prison from 1954 to 1956. In 1956 he became executive secretary of the Overseas Mission Society of the Episcopal Church of the United States in Washington, D.C. During his assignment with the Overseas Mission Society, he served short-term pastorates in Tokyo, Japan, Mexico City, Mexico, and Vienna, Austria. In 1968 he served a year as consultant to the House of Bishops, before becoming rector of the Church of Mediator in Allentown, Pennsylvania, in 1969. In 1973 he became rector of St Alban's Church in Washington, D.C., where he remained till 1982. He served two terms as a Trustee of the Virginia Theological Seminary from 1962 until 1967.

== Educator ==
In 1963, Eastman was a visiting fellow at the Episcopal Theological Seminary of the Southwest. He also was a guest lecturer at the Episcopal Divinity School in Cambridge, Massachusetts, in 1964, and at the College of Preachers in 1966. As bishop, Eastman chaired the Council of the College of Preachers from 1978 until 1982, where he was also a fellow. He chaired the Steering Committee of the College of Bishops, an innovative three-year program of formation for newly elected bishops, hosted by the General Theological Seminary in New York, New York.

== Bishop ==
Eastman was elected Coadjutor Bishop of the Episcopal Diocese of Maryland on March 20, 1982, during a special diocesan convention in Trinity Church, Towson, Maryland. He was consecrated on June 26, 1982, by Presiding Bishop John Allin, assisted by David Leighton, Bishop of Maryland, and Harry Lee Doll, former Bishop of Maryland, in Washington National Cathedral. He succeeded as diocesan bishop in January 1986 and retired in January 1994. During his tenure as bishop, he served in other capacities in the Episcopal Church, notably as Vice Chair of the Standing Committee on World Mission and Chair of the Presiding Bishop's Fund for World Relief. His work in mission and ecumenism took him to more three dozen countries in Africa, Asia, Latin America, Europe, and the Middle East.

Between 1991 and 1994 he also served as chairman of the Standing Commission on Ecumenical Relations of the Episcopal Church. From 1984 until 1992, he co-chaired the Anglican-Roman Catholic Consultation in the United States. Later he was also installed as a member of the Washington National Cathedral chapter.

He was a Member of the Board of Trustees of Listening Hearts Ministries, a Baltimore, Maryland-based organization that provides training and resource for spiritual discernment.

== Retirement ==
In 1998, Bishop Eastman was asked to serve as Provost of the Washington National Cathedral, during the sabbatical leave of then Dean Nathan D. Baxter. He became the Executive Vice President and later the Senior Executive Director of Protestant Episcopal Cathedral Foundation. After the departure of Dean Baxter following his consecration as the 10th Bishop of the Episcopal Diocese of Central Pennsylvania, Eastman was called to serve as Vicar of the Washington National Cathedral from 2003 to 2005. During that time among other duties he led the planning and participated in the State Funeral for President Ronald Reagan delivering the benediction. Eastman also participated in the National Prayer Service on January 21, 2005, following the inauguration of President George W. Bush.

He died on April 26, 2018, in a hospital in Arlington, Virginia, due to complications related to Parkinson's disease.

== Hymns ==
Eastman wrote the lyrics to the following hymns during his lifetime.

- Holy and Creative Spirit, tune by the Reverend Richard Townsend Carrol Peard, 1975
- Hail Thee Festival Day, Christmas edition, tune by Ralph Vaughan Williams, 1906
- Mighty God of Cosmic Splendor, tune by Gary Davison, 1999

== Published works ==
- Associate Editor, Overseas Mission Review, 1957-1968
- Letters from the Rim of Asia, The National Council, 1962
- Christian Responsibility in One World (The Kellogg Lectures), Seabury, 1965
- Missions: “In” or Out?, Friendship Press, 1967
- New Life in a Congregation, Audenshaw Foundation, 1969
- Chosen and Sent: Calling the Church to Mission William B. Eerdmans Publishing Company, 1971
- The Baptizing Community: Christian Initiation and the Local Congregation, Morehouse Publishing, 1990 ISBN 9780866837996

Episcopal Church (USA) titles
| Preceded by David Keller Leighton | Bishop of Maryland; 1986−1994 | Succeeded by Robert Wilkes Ihloff |
