= Cathedral of the Incarnation =

Cathedral of the Incarnation and Incarnation Cathedral are names of several churches:

== Spain ==
- Granada Cathedral
- Málaga Cathedral

== United States ==
- Cathedral of the Incarnation (Baltimore, Maryland) (Episcopal)
- Cathedral of the Incarnation (Garden City, New York) (Episcopal)
- Cathedral of the Incarnation, Nashville, Tennessee (Roman Catholic)
