= Rezin Beall =

American Revolutionary War general (1723–1809)

- Born: Rezin Beall; 1723
- Died: 1809 (aged 85–86)
- Military career
- Allegiance: United States
- Rank: Brigadier General
- Commands: Flying Camp
- Conflicts: Battle of Harlem Heights; Battle of Trenton; Battle of Princeton; American Revolutionary War

Brigadier General Rezin Beall (1723–1809) was appointed commander of Maryland's Flying Camp militia by the United States Congress.

== Career ==
On 17 July 1776, Captain Beall was wounded in action on St. George Island, Maryland in a battle resisting efforts of British forces under the command of John Murray, 4th Earl of Dunmore to land on the mainland in Maryland.

He is buried at St. John's Episcopal Church in Beltsville, Maryland.
