= William Pinkney (bishop) =

American bishop (1810–1883)

The Right Reverend William Pinkney D.D., LL.D.
- Bishop of Maryland
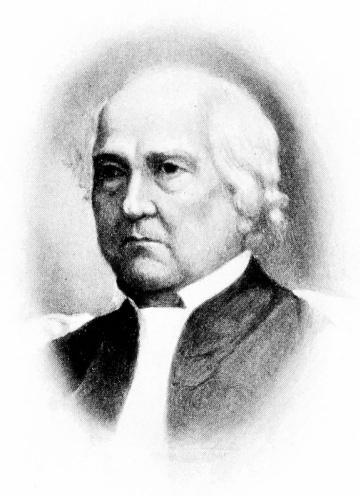
- Church: Episcopal Church
- Diocese: Maryland
- In office: 1879–1883
- Predecessor: William Rollinson Whittingham
- Successor: William Paret
- Previous post: Coadjutor Bishop of Maryland (1870-1879)

Orders
- Ordination: May 27, 1836 by William Murray Stone
- Consecration: October 6, 1870 by Benjamin B. Smith

Personal details
- Born: April 17, 1810 Annapolis, Maryland, U.S.
- Died: July 4, 1883 (aged 73) Cockeysville, Maryland, U.S.
- Buried: Oak Hill Cemetery; Washington, D.C., U.S.
- Denomination: Anglican
- Parents: Ninian Pinkney & Amelia Grason Hobbs
- Spouse: Elizabeth Lloyd Lowndes

William Pinkney (April 17, 1810 – July 4, 1883) was fifth bishop of the Episcopal Diocese of Maryland.

== Early life ==
He was born in Annapolis, Maryland and attended St. John's College, Annapolis, from which he graduated at age 17. He studied law under his uncle, Severus Pinkney, and was admitted to the bar, but never practiced. Instead, influenced by his mother, a devout Methodist, in 1831 he entered Princeton Theological Seminary to study for the ministry. Financial and family circumstances forced his withdrawal two years later, and Pinkney became a tutor to the family of John Neville Steele, a devout Episcopalian in Dorchester County, Maryland. He decided to apply for holy orders with that denomination.

He married Elizabeth Lowndes, from a prominent family in Prince George's County, on October 2, 1838.

== Career ==
Maryland's bishop, the Right Reverend William Murray Stone ordained Pinkney to the diaconate on April 12, 1835, and to the priesthood the following year. Pinkney was initially assigned to Somerset and Coventry parishes on the Eastern Shore, but his health soon failed. He then became rector of St. Matthew's Episcopal Church in Hyattsville, Maryland (formerly known as Addison's Chapel) and its chapel of ease Zion Parish. During his leadership of those parishes, which lasted until 1857, Pinkney secured the rebuilding of both churches. St. Matthew's congregation moved to a larger Gothic-style frame building in Bladensburg, Maryland, in 1844, which was consecrated in 1856. St. John's Episcopal Church, Zion Parish (which had once been the lower chapel of that parish and burned down in 1845), was rebuilt and consecrated in 1856. After getting both congregations onto solid footings and declining a call from the Church of the Epiphany (Washington, D.C.), Pinkney finally decided to move into Washington, D.C., and serve as rector of the Church of the Ascension.

During the American Civil War, bishop William Rollinson Whittingham, who had convinced Pinkney to accept the Ascension position just before the war, reprimanded the southern-sympathizing priest for failing to say prayers for President Lincoln, and instituted ecclesiastical proceedings against him (which failed). Pinkney served at Ascension 13 years, and after the war ended also served as assistant to Bishop Whittingham, whose Northern sympathies had caused considerable unpopularity.

On April 24, 1883, he officiated at the wedding of Donald McLean and Emily Nelson Ritchie at All Saints Church in Frederick, Maryland.

== Episcopate ==
In 1870, the Diocese of Maryland held its convention in the Church of the Epiphany in Washington, D.C., and Pinkney was elected as coadjutor to the ailing Bishop Whittingham. Presiding Bishop Benjamin Bosworth Smith was his principal consecrator on October 6, 1870, assisted by bishops John Johns of Virginia and Thomas Atkinson of North Carolina. Pinkney administered the diocese during Whittingham's extended convalescence before succeeding his mentor upon his death in 1879.

== Death and legacy ==
Pinkney's grave in Oak Hill Cemetery, Washington, D.C., in 2026

Bishop Pinkney died in office on July 4, 1883. He is buried in Oak Hill Cemetery in Washington, with the grave sculpture financed by his friend, the financier W.W.Corcoran. The Maryland diocesan convention the following year elected William Paret his successor. A memorial church honoring his memory was built at Hyattsville (whose founder Christopher C. Hyatt he had confirmed in 1855), but later destroyed. The windows behind the altar at St. John's Episcopal Church, Zion Parish, where he had once served and whose rebuilding in brick he had secured, were also donated in his memory.

Episcopal Church (USA) titles
Preceded by William Rollinson Whittingham	Bishop of Maryland; 1879 – 1883	Succeeded by William Paret
