= Eugene Sutton =

American bishop

The Right Reverend Eugene Sutton
- Bishop of Maryland
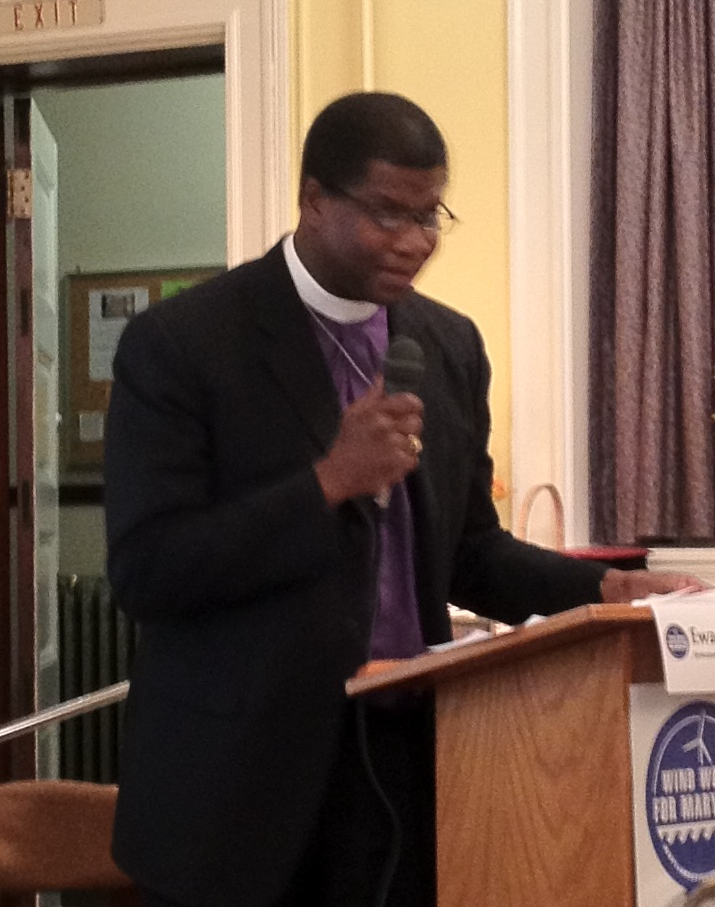
- Sutton in 2011
- Church: Episcopal Church
- Province: III
- Diocese: Maryland
- Elected: June 29, 2008
- In office: 2008–2024
- Predecessor: Robert W. Ihloff
- Successor: Carrie Schofield-Broadbent

Orders
- Consecration: June 28, 2008 by Katharine Jefferts Schori

Personal details
- Born: January 9, 1954 (age 72) Washington, D.C., US
- Denomination: Anglican (prev. Baptist)
- Spouse: Sonya Subbayya Sutton
- Children: 4
- Education: Hope College; Western Theological Seminary; Princeton Theological Seminary; Sewanee: The University of the South

Eugene Taylor Sutton (born January 9, 1954) is an American Episcopal clergyman who served as the 14th Episcopal Bishop of Maryland.

== Early life and education ==
Sutton grew up in Washington, D.C., in a Baptist family. In 1976 he graduated from Hope College in Holland, Michigan. He later earned a Master of Divinity degree from Western Theological Seminary in the same city and was ordained as a Minister of Word and Sacrament in the Reformed Church in America. Sutton continued his graduate studies at Princeton Theological Seminary, and after a few years joined the Episcopal Church, completing his Anglican ministry training in 1993 at the University of the South in Sewanee, Tennessee.

== Career ==
Sutton served in parishes in New Jersey and Washington, D.C., and taught at the New Brunswick Theological Seminary, the Vanderbilt University Divinity School and the General Theological Seminary.

On June 28, 2008, he was consecrated as Bishop of Maryland, having been elected at the previous diocesan convention on the first ballot. The consecration was held at the Washington National Cathedral, where Sutton had served as canon pastor. He became the first African American bishop for the Diocese of Maryland, and was installed in the Cathedral of the Incarnation on June 29, 2008.

On September 17, 2021, he announced his intention to retire in 2024. He was succeeded by the Rt. Rev. Canon Carrie Schofield-Broadbent, who was elected bishop coadjutor in 2023.

== See also ==
- List of Episcopal bishops of the United States
- Historical list of the Episcopal bishops of the United States

Episcopal Church (USA) titles
Preceded by Robert Wilkes Ihloff	Bishop of Maryland; 2008–2024	Succeeded by Carrie Schofield-Broadbent
