= Carrie Schofield-Broadbent =

American bishop

The Right Reverend Carrie Schofield-Broadbent
- Bishop of Maryland
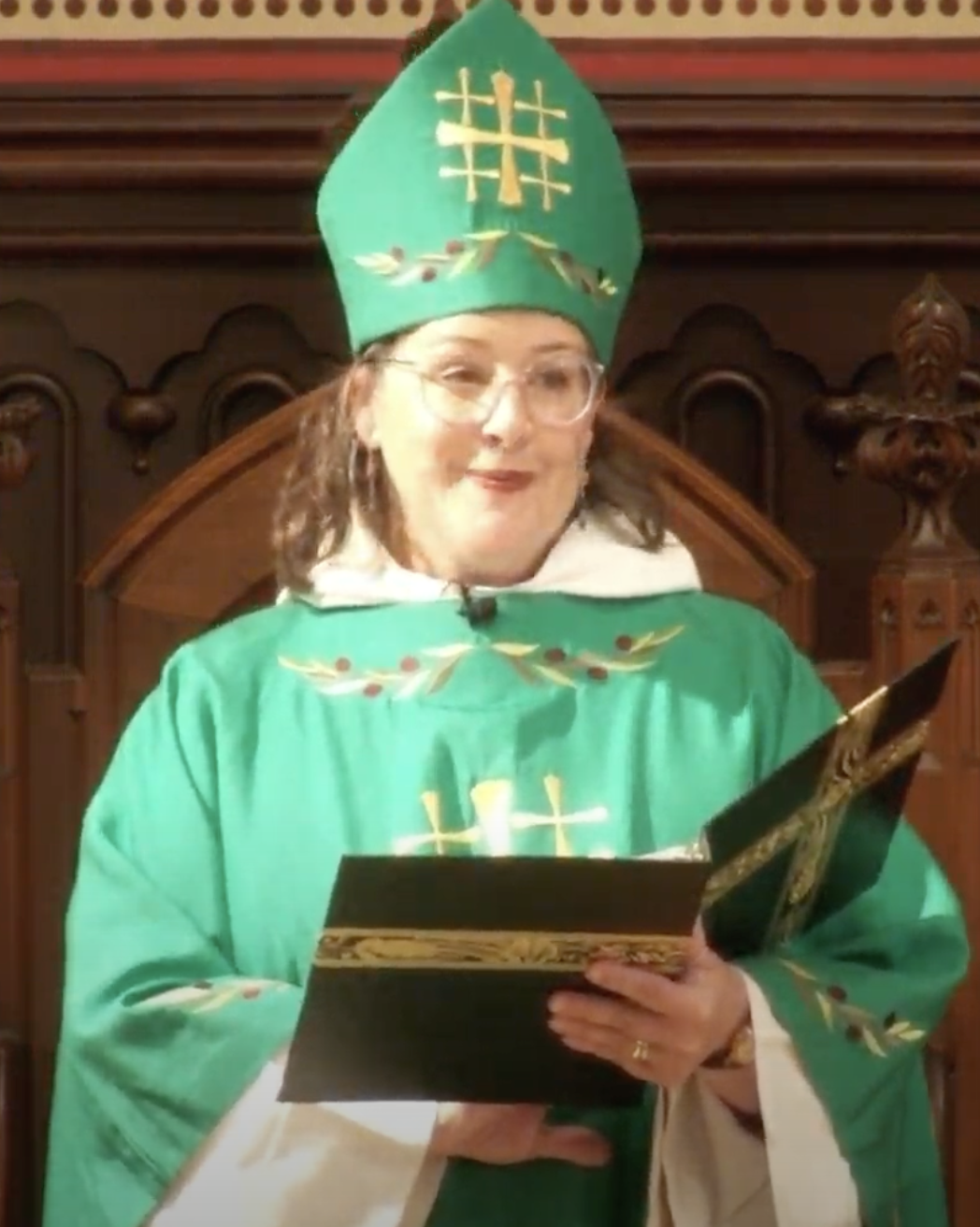
- Schofield-Broadbent in 2025
- Church: Episcopal Church
- Province: III
- Diocese: Maryland
- Elected: March 25, 2023
- In office: 2024-present
- Predecessor: Eugene Sutton

Orders
- Ordination: 2003 (deacon); 2004 (priest) by Gladstone B. Adams III
- Consecration: September 16, 2023 by Mary Gray-Reeves

Personal details
- Born: Syracuse, N.Y., US
- Denomination: Anglican
- Spouse: Keith Schofield-Broadbent
- Children: 2
- Education: Juniata College; Virginia Theological Seminary

The Right Rev. Carrie Schofield-Broadbent (born 1974) is an American bishop who has served as the 15th Bishop of Maryland since 2024.

== Education and career ==
Schofield-Broadbent received a Bachelor's degree in Spanish and Peace and Conflict Studies from Juniata College in Huntingdon, Pennsylvania, in 1997, having spent a year at the University of Barcelona in Spain. In 2003 she was awarded a Master of Divinity degree from Virginia Theological Seminary.

She was ordained at St. Paul's, Owego, NY, as a deacon in 2003, where she served as Assistant Rector, and then ordained as a priest in 2004, also at St. Paul's, Owego. She was Rector of St Matthew's Church in Liverpool, New York, from 2006 to 2017 before being appointed Canon to the Ordinary for Transition and Church Development in the Diocese of Central New York.

On 25 March 2023 Schofield-Broadbent was elected bishop coadjutor in the Episcopal Diocese of Maryland. She succeeded the Rt. Rev. Eugene Sutton as Bishop of Maryland upon his retirement in 2024 and is the first woman to serve in that role.

She is also a trainer for the College for Congregational Development and speaks both English and Spanish.

== Family ==
With her husband Keith, a marketing executive, Schofield-Broadbent has two children.

Episcopal Church (USA) titles
| Preceded by Eugene Taylor Sutton | Bishop of Maryland; 2024–present | Incumbent |
