= Robert W. Ihloff =

American bishop

The Right Reverend Robert W. Ihloff D.D.
- Bishop of Maryland
- Church: Episcopal Church
- Province: III
- Diocese: Diocese of Maryland
- Elected: May 20, 1995
- In office: 1995–2007
- Predecessor: A. Theodore Eastman
- Successor: Eugene Sutton
- Other post: Associate Bishop of Virginia (2018-present)

Orders
- Ordination: 1968
- Consecration: October 21, 1995 by Edmond L. Browning

Personal details
- Born: May 19, 1941 (age 85) New Britain, Connecticut, United States
- Denomination: Anglican
- Parents: Ernest Otto Ihloff & Mildred Arlene Schnippel
- Spouse: Nancy Virginia Bailey (m. June 11, 1966)
- Children: 2
- Education: Ursinus College; Episcopal Divinity School

Robert Wilkes Ihloff (born May 19, 1941) was thirteenth bishop of the Episcopal Diocese of Maryland from 1995 till 2007.

== Early life and education ==
Ihloff was born on May 19, 1941, in New Britain, Connecticut, the son of Ernest Otto Ihloff and Mildred Arlene Schnippel. He studied at Ursinus College and graduated with a Bachelor of Arts in 1964. He then studied at the Episcopal Theological Seminary and graduated with a Master of Divinity in 1967. In 1971 he also graduated with a Master of Arts in European history from Central Connecticut State College. In 1978 he gained a certificate from the Boston Gestalt Institute. In 1985, he pursued studies and graduated with a Doctor of Ministry from Episcopal Divinity School, with a thesis on Group Spiritual Direction.

== Ordained ministry ==
He was ordained deacon in 1967 and priest in 1968. After his diaconal ordination, he became curate of St Mark's Church in New Britain, Connecticut, till 1969. He then became vicar of St George's Church in Bolton, Connecticut, while in 1972 he left for Trinity church in Southport, Connecticut, to become priest-in-charge. In 1976 he became rector of St Paul's Church in Natick, Massachusetts, until becoming presiding minister of the united parish of Natick, Massachusetts, between 1980 and 1983. Between 1987 and 1995, he served as rector of Grace Episcopal Church (Madison, New Jersey).

== Bishop ==
Ihloff was elected Bishop of Maryland on May 20, 1995, and was consecrated on October 21, 1995, in Washington National Cathedral by Presiding Bishop Edmond L. Browning. He retired in 2007. In 2018 he was appointed as Associate Bishop of Virginia.

Episcopal Church (USA) titles
Preceded by Albert Theodore Eastman	Bishop of Maryland; 1995−2007	Succeeded by Eugene Taylor Sutton
