= Harry Lee Doll =

American Episcopal bishop (1903–1984)

The Right Reverend Harry Lee Doll D.D.
- Bishop of Maryland
- Church: Episcopal Church
- Diocese: Maryland
- In office: 1963–1971
- Predecessor: Noble C. Powell
- Successor: David Leighton
- Previous posts: Suffragan Bishop of Maryland (1955-1958); Coadjutor Bishop of Maryland (1958-1963)

Orders
- Ordination: June 1933 by Robert E. L. Strider Sr.
- Consecration: May 24, 1955 by Henry Knox Sherrill

Personal details
- Born: July 31, 1903 Martinsburg, West Virginia, United States
- Died: August 27, 1984 (aged 81) Baltimore, Maryland, United States
- Buried: St. Thomas Church (Owings Mills, Maryland)
- Denomination: Anglican
- Parents: Harry Lee Doll, Sr. (1853-1916) and Millicent Scott Jones (1869-1927)
- Spouse: Delia Frances Gould (m. 1933)
- Children: 3

Harry Lee Doll (July 31, 1903 – August 27, 1984), was bishop of the Episcopal Diocese of Maryland during the turmoil concerning civil rights for minorities and women in the 1960s.

== Early and Family Life ==
A native of Martinsburg, West Virginia, Doll graduated from the College of William and Mary in Williamsburg, Virginia, and then received a degree in theology after studies at the Virginia Theological Seminary, in Alexandria, Virginia.

He married Delia Frances Gould (1908-2005), a native of Alabama and described as "the personification of a Southern lady", in 1933, and they had three daughters.

== Career ==
He was ordained deacon in October, 1932 by Bishop William Loyall Gravatt of West Virginia, and priest in June, 1933 by Bishop Robert E. L. Strider Sr. Coadjutor of Maryland. After ordination, Doll served as assistant rector at Epiphany Episcopal Church in Washington, D.C., then became rector of Christ Church, Alexandria, Virginia, and rector of a large parish in Houston, Texas, before accepting a call as rector of Old St. Paul's, Baltimore, Maryland in 1942. In 1955 Doll was elected and consecrated suffragan bishop for the Diocese of Maryland and served in that position for five years before being elected coadjutor to the popular Noble C. Powell. Five years later, Bishop Doll succeeded Bishop Powell upon his retirement.

A strong supporter of civil rights, open housing and community revitalization, Bishop Doll joined with Baltimore's Catholic Cardinal Lawrence Shehan in 1966 to publicly support open housing legislation in testimony before the City Council, despite boos and jeers from the public gallery. A friend and supporter of Presiding Bishop John Hines, Doll also became a visible proponent of the controversial General Convention Special Program, which responded to poverty and injustice in America's ghettos.

Along with Cardinal Shehan (with whom he worked closely on many issues) and the President of St. Mary's Seminary and University, in 1968 Bishop Doll founded Baltimore's Ecumenical Institute, and continued as a trustee. Bishop Doll also served as President of the Maryland Council of Churches.

Doll retired in 1971 and was succeeded by David Keller Leighton, Sr., although he continued active in Episcopal Church affairs, including the revision to the Book of Common Prayer adopted in 1979. He also strongly supported the ordination of women to the priesthood, and one of his daughters became a priest, the Rev. Mary Chotard Doll.

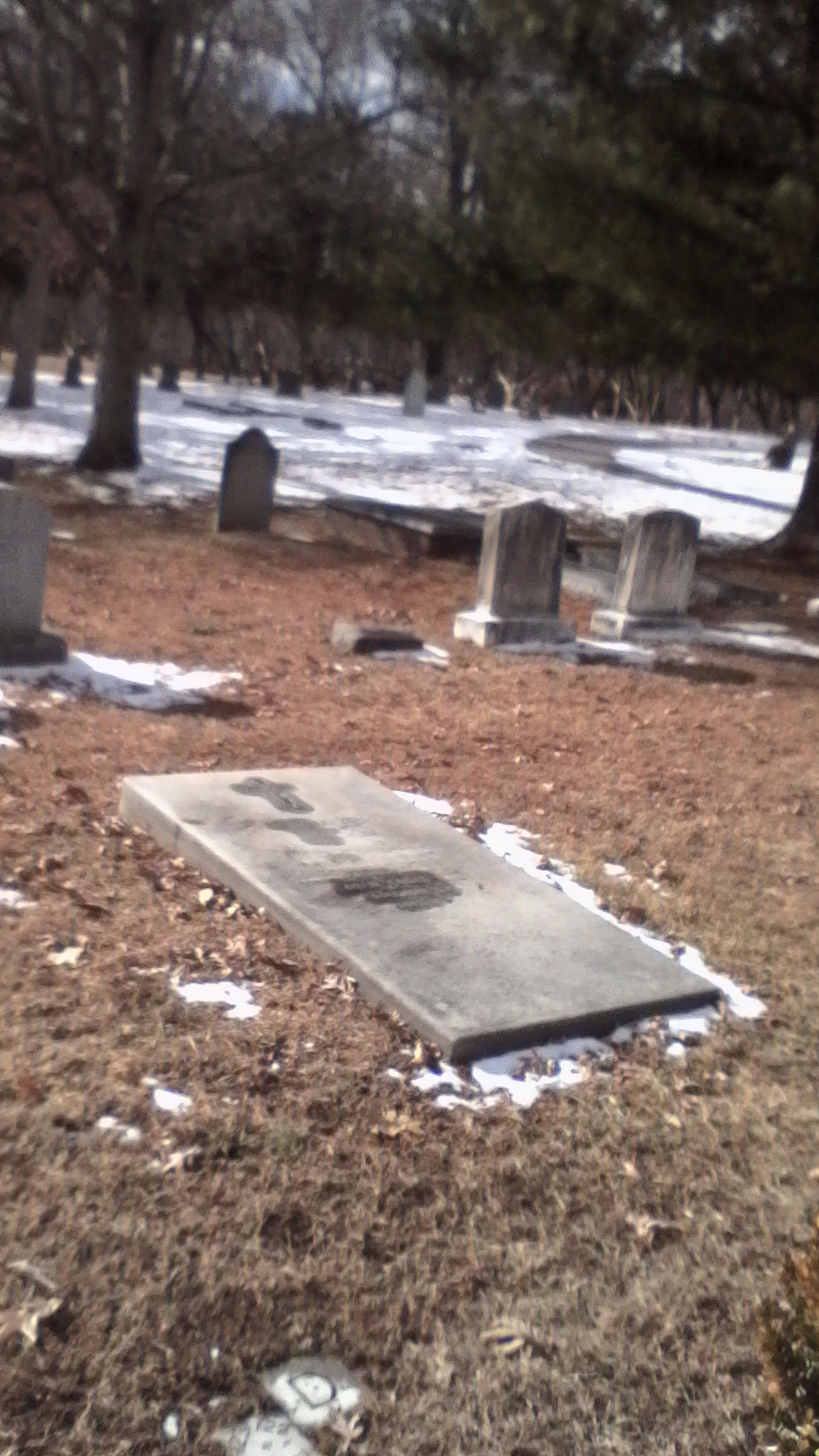
St. Thomas' churchyard

== Death and legacy ==
Oddly, Bishop Doll died within hours of his longtime friend Cardinal Shehan, and their funerals were held on the same day; Bishop John E. Hines delivered the sermon at Bishop Doll's funeral. He is buried with his wife in St. Thomas Church's cemetery in Owings Mills, Maryland.

Episcopal Church (USA) titles
Preceded by Noble Cilley Powell	Bishop of Maryland; 1963–1971	Succeeded by David Keller Leighton
