= John Gardner Murray =

American bishop

The Most Reverend John Gardner Murray
- 16th Presiding Bishop of the Episcopal Church
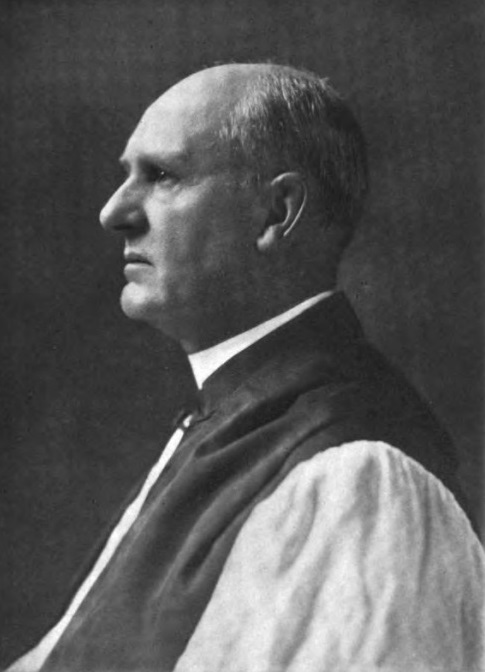
- Church: Episcopal Church
- Diocese: Maryland
- Elected: October 1925
- In office: 1926–1929
- Predecessor: Ethelbert Talbot
- Successor: Charles P. Anderson
- Other post: Bishop of Maryland (1911-1929)
- Previous post: Coadjutor Bishop of Maryland (1909-1911)

Orders
- Ordination: April 16, 1894 by Richard Hooker Wilmer
- Consecration: September 29, 1909 by William Paret

Personal details
- Born: August 31, 1857 Lonaconing, Maryland, United States
- Died: October 3, 1929 (aged 72) New York City, New York, United States
- Buried: Druid Ridge Cemetery, Pikesville, Maryland
- Denomination: Anglican (prev. Methodist Episcopal Church)
- Parents: James Murray & Ann Kirkwood
- Spouse: Harriett May Sprague (m. 1881); Clara Alice Hunsicker (m. 1899)
- Children: 5

John Gardner Murray (August 31, 1857 – October 3, 1929) was the sixteenth presiding bishop of the Episcopal Church. He was the first person elected to the position rather than succeeding to it automatically as the oldest bishop when his predecessor died.

== Early and family life ==
Murray was born in Lonaconing, Allegany County. His parents were both born in Scotland. The public schools of Lonaconing provided his early education. He attended the Wyoming Seminary in Pennsylvania and Drew Theological Seminary in New Jersey.

Murray's education was interrupted by the death of his father. He worked in mining and manufacturing from 1879 to 1892 in Kansas, Colorado, New Mexico and Alabama. During these years, he kept active in serving his church. In 1881, he married Harriet May Sprague (1860-1884). They married in Kansas and took up residence in Alabama. Their daughter Emeline was born there. In 1884, Mrs. Murray and Emeline drowned when the steamer Belmont capsized on the Ohio River during a cyclone. Five years later, Murray married Clara Alice Hunsicker (1864-1937), of the same town in Kansas. Six children were born to this marriage.

== Ministry ==
From 1893 onward, Murray devoted his career to church ministry. By April 1894, he was ordained a priest of the Episcopal Church in Selma, Alabama. He ministered in Alabama until 1903 when he moved to Baltimore, Maryland. In 1911, a convention of the Diocese of Maryland elected Murray to succeed Bishop William Paret.

Bishop Murray became the first elected Presiding Bishop of the Episcopal Church, serving from January 1, 1926, until his death on October 3, 1929. He proposed "Pay, Pray, and Perform" as a possible slogan for the church. Bishop Murray was the 16th Presiding Bishop. Previous bishops had been assigned by the General Convention by geographic rotation (1st through 3rd) or by seniority as a bishop (4th through 15th).

== Death and legacy ==
He died in office in New York City in 1929, and is buried in Druid Ridge Cemetery in Pikesville, Baltimore County, Maryland.

== See also ==
- List of presiding bishops of the Episcopal Church in the United States of America
- List of Episcopal bishops of the United States
- Historical list of the Episcopal bishops of the United States
- Frederick, Maryland

Episcopal Church (USA) titles
Preceded by Ethelbert Talbot	16th Presiding Bishop; January 1, 1926 – October 3, 1929	Succeeded by Charles Palmerston Anderson
Preceded by William Paret	Bishop of Maryland; 1911–1929	Succeeded by Edward Trail Helfenstein
