= St. Thomas Church (Owings Mills, Maryland) =

Historic church in Maryland, United States

- U.S. National Register of Historic Places
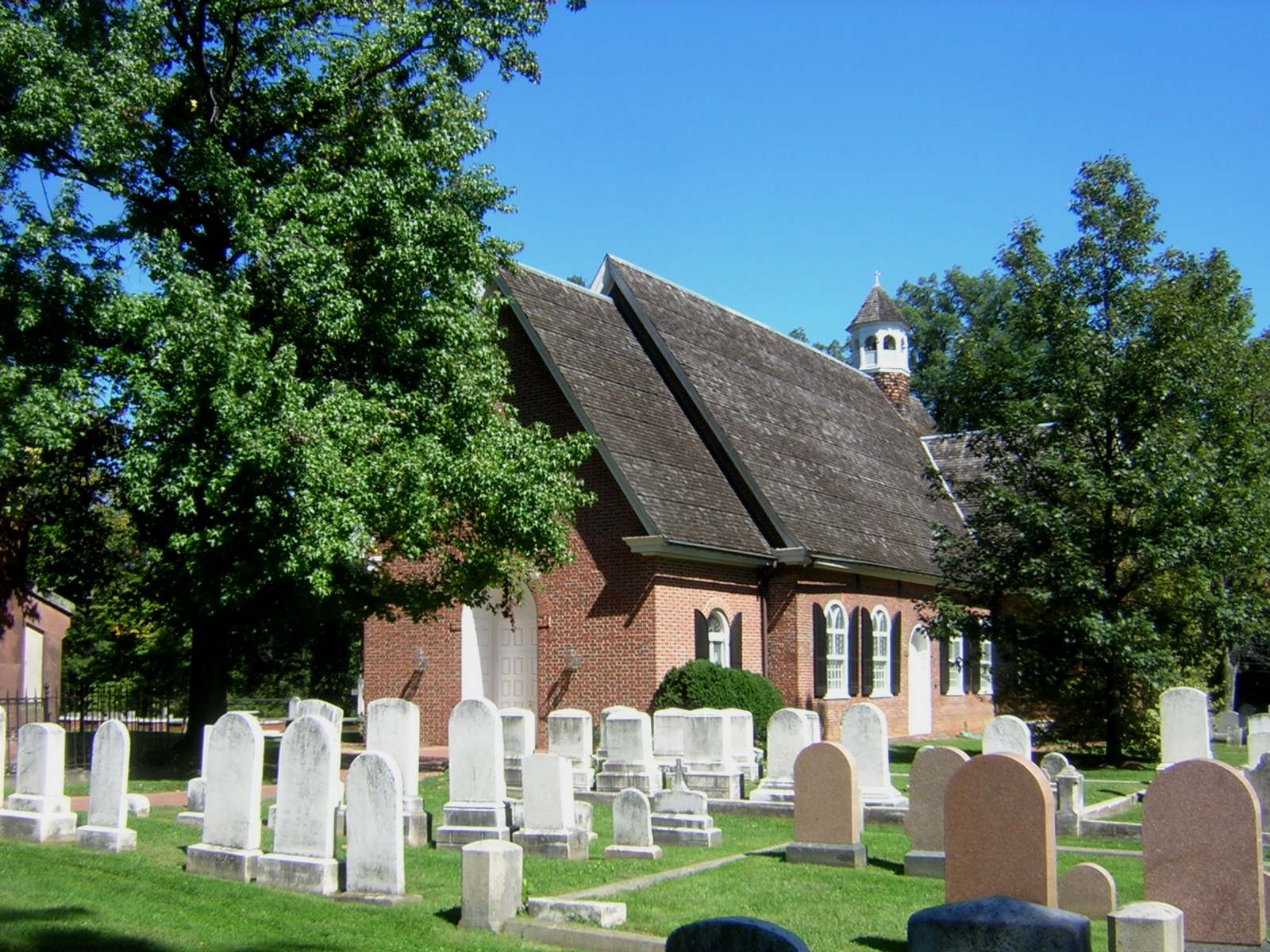
- From the south

- Location within Maryland Location within the United States
- Location: 260 St. Thomas Lane, Owings Mills, Md
- Coordinates: 39°25′19″N 76°45′43″W
- Area: 8 acres (3.2 ha)
- Built: 1743
- Architectural style: Georgian
- NRHP reference No.: 79001117
- Added to NRHP: May 24, 1979

St. Thomas' Episcopal Church is a parish of the Episcopal Church in Owings Mills, Baltimore County, Maryland, part of the Diocese of Maryland. It is noted for its historic parish church, built in 1743.

== History ==
Construction was authorized in 1742 by the Province of Maryland to provide a "Chapel of Ease" for early inhabitants of the Garrison Forest. Rev. Thomas Craddock was appointed first minister on January 14, 1745.

On April 13, 1782, The Rev. John Andrews returned to Maryland from York, Pennsylvania to become rector of the church, known at the time as St. Thomas Church in Garrison Forest, a position he held until 1784. Early members included Christopher Gist, John Eager Howard (for whom the nearby Howard County is named), Sequoyah, and his mother, Wut-teh.

== Architecture ==
The original building, built in 1743 of salmon red brick, was a 56 x 36 foot (17 x 11m) rectangle. Eight windows with round arch tops lighted the building, four on each of the long walls. These retain much of their original 1743 glass. There were also three similar windows on the short liturgical west wall and a small window near the peak of the roof. (The building sits on an angle, so that liturgical west is actually southwest.) The entrance was in the liturgical south wall. It had a wide, brick paved, center aisle and white box pews, both of which remain.

In the late 19th century, the door in the south wall was removed and an entrance created by removing the center window from the west wall. In 1891 transepts and a small, barrel shaped, chancel were added, changing the simple rectangle into a cruciform. There are lancet windows in the east end, one created by John LaFarge depicting the Ascension. A Tiffany window was added later. The transepts have rose windows in yellow, brown, green and colourless glass.

In 1970, a major restoration of the church was accomplished. This included the addition of a narthex to the liturgical west, providing access both to the church and to a new basement.

== Historical credentials ==
- A roadside plaque was erected 1936 by Maryland State Roads Commission. Inscription reads "A frontier parish church authorized by Act of Assembly 1742 as “a Chapel of Ease for the Forest Inhabitants” of Saint Paul's Parish (Baltimore). Reverend Thomas Craddock inducted as first minister January 14, 1745."
- The church was added to the National Register of Historic Places on May 24, 1979, reference number 79001117.

== Graveyard ==
The cemetery contains the graves of many of the area's prominent people. Many date back to the 18th century, although most of the older markers are unreadable.

=== Notable burials ===
- Hetty Cary, best remembered for making the first three battle flags of the Confederacy (along with her sister and cousin).
- Samuel Owings, who is buried there, was a successful miller for whom Owings Mills was named.
- Edgar Allan Poe (1871–1961), Attorney General of Maryland and quarterback of Princeton Tigers
- Sam Shoemaker, born in the parish and who helped found Alcoholics Anonymous.
- Daniel Brewster U.S Senator from Maryland.

== Gallery ==
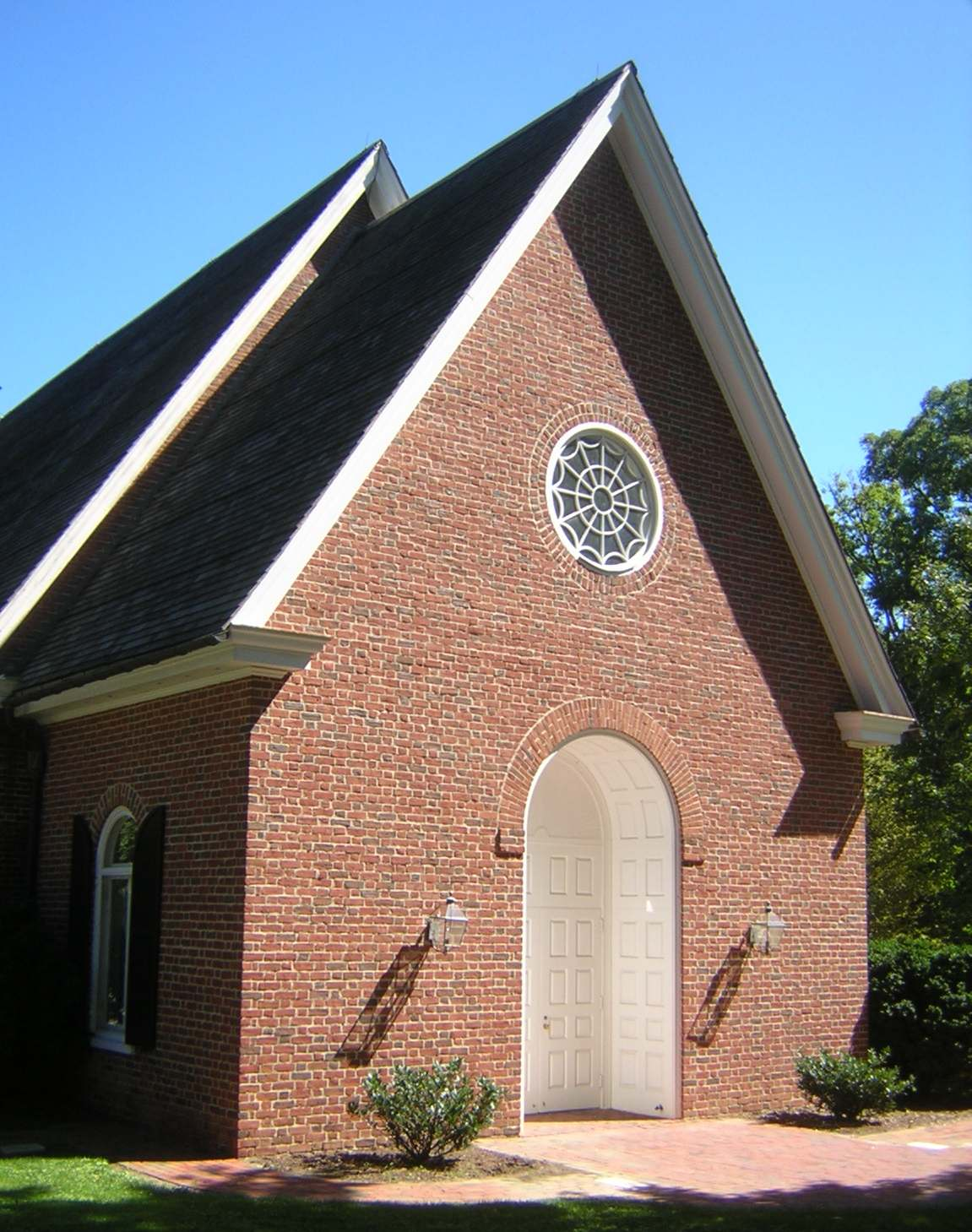
The 1970 narthex. The original building begins at the break in the roof line.

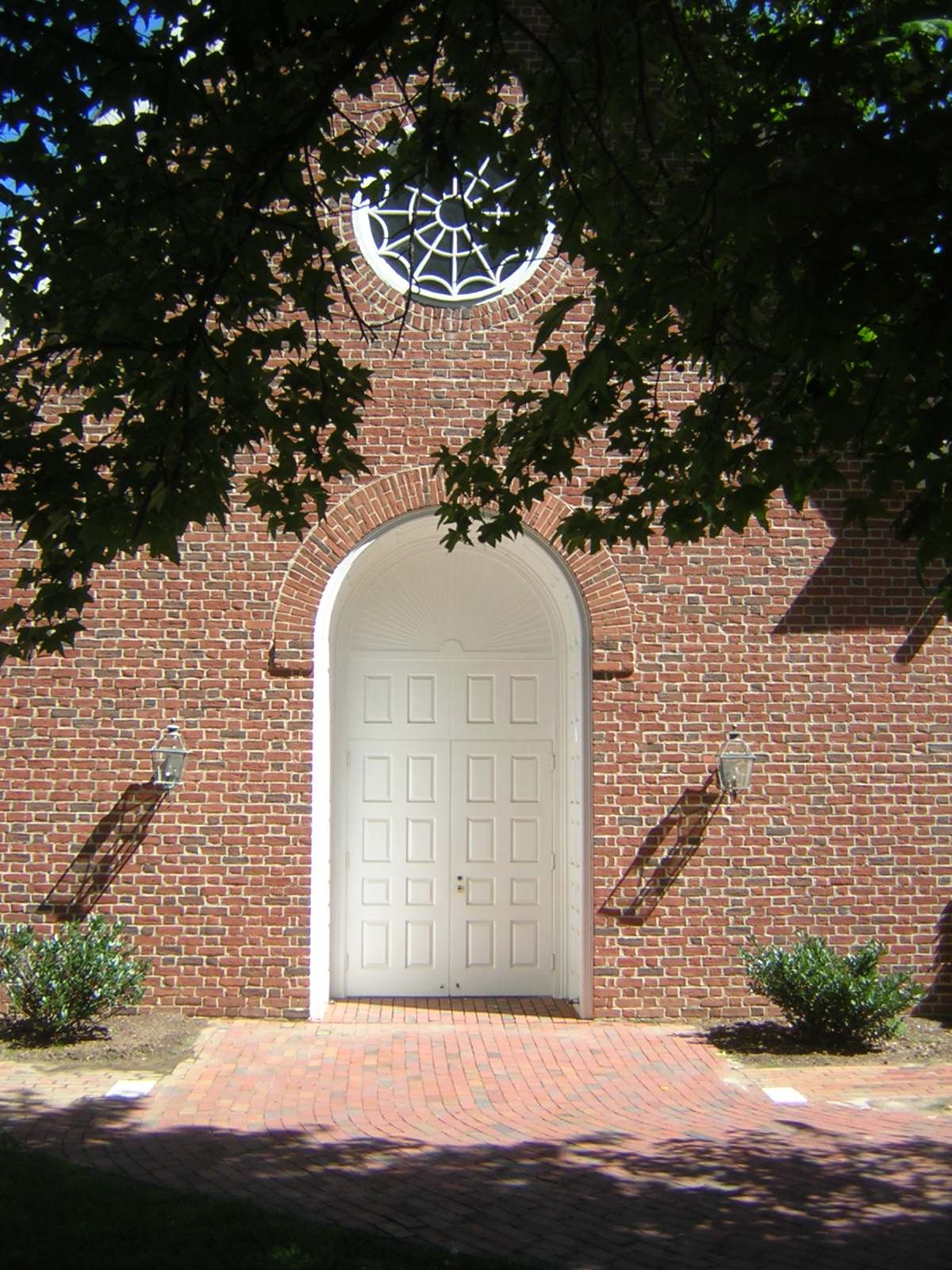
Front Door
1970

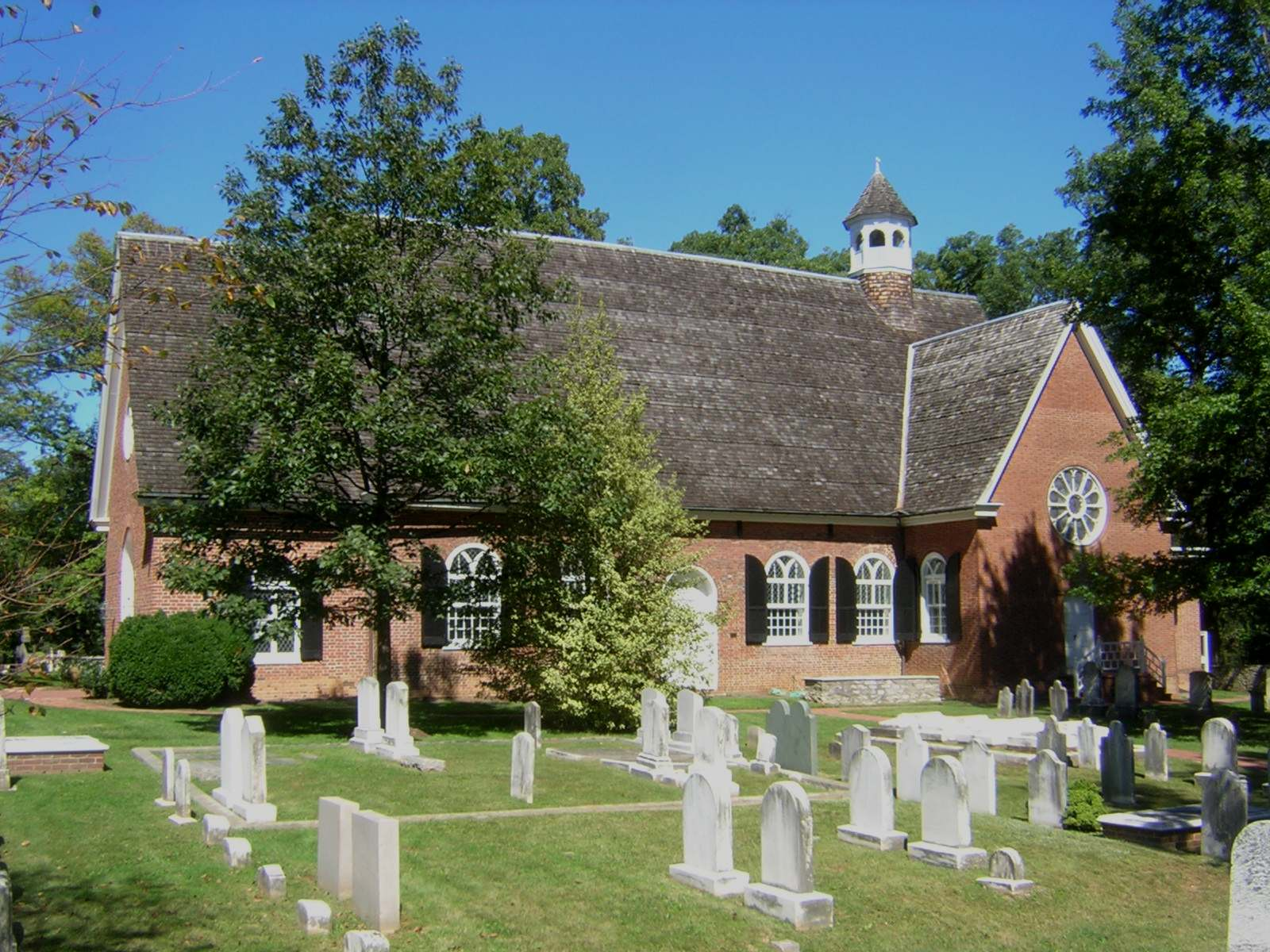
From southeast

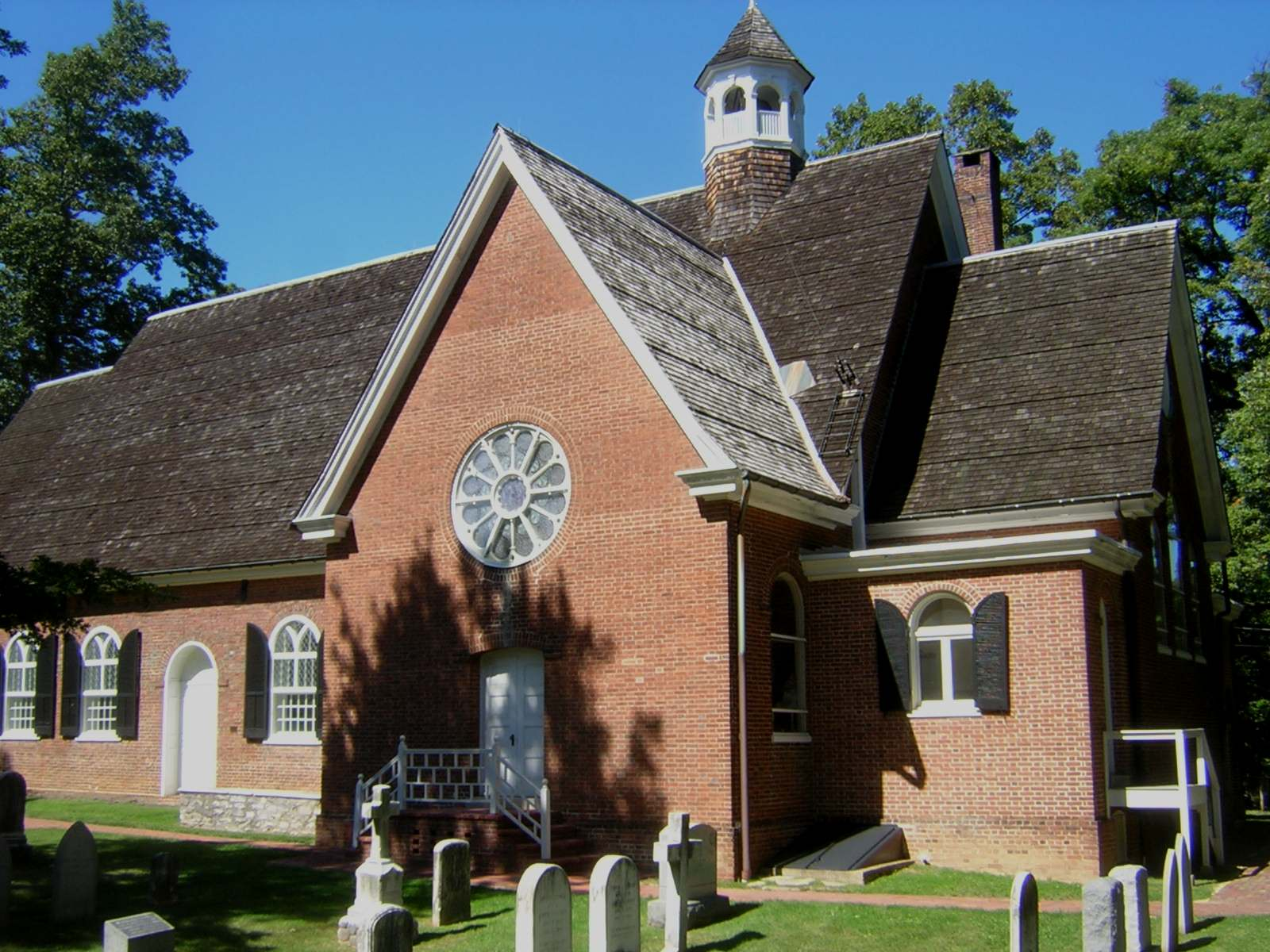
From east

== See also ==
- List of post 1692 Anglican parishes in the Province of Maryland
