= Episcopal Diocese of Maryland =

Episcopal Church diocese in the US

Coordinates: 39°20′N 76°37′W

Diocese of Maryland Dioecesis Terrae Mariae

Location
- Country: United States
- Territory: Counties of Allegany, Anne Arundel, Baltimore, Calvert, Carroll, Frederick, Garrett, Harford, Howard, and Washington, and the independent city of Baltimore
- Ecclesiastical province: Province III

Statistics
- Congregations: 97 (2025)
- Members: 23,548 (2025)

Information
- Denomination: Episcopal Church
- Established: November 9, 1780
- Cathedral: Cathedral of the Incarnation
- Language: English

Current leadership
- Bishop: Carrie Schofield-Broadbent

Map
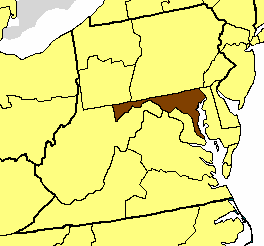
- Location of the Diocese of Maryland

Website
- episcopalmaryland.org

The Episcopal Diocese of Maryland forms part of Province 3 of the Episcopal Church in the United States of America. Having been divided twice, it no longer includes all of Maryland and now consists of the central, northern, and western Maryland counties of Allegany, Anne Arundel, Baltimore, Calvert, Carroll, Frederick, Garrett, Harford, Howard, and Washington, as well as the independent city of Baltimore.

The diocese reported 36,479 members in 2017 and 23,548 members in 2025. Plate and pledge income for the 97 filing congregations of the diocese in 2024 was $23,105,051. Average Sunday attendance (ASA) was 6,160 persons, a relative decline from 9,404 in 2016.

== History ==
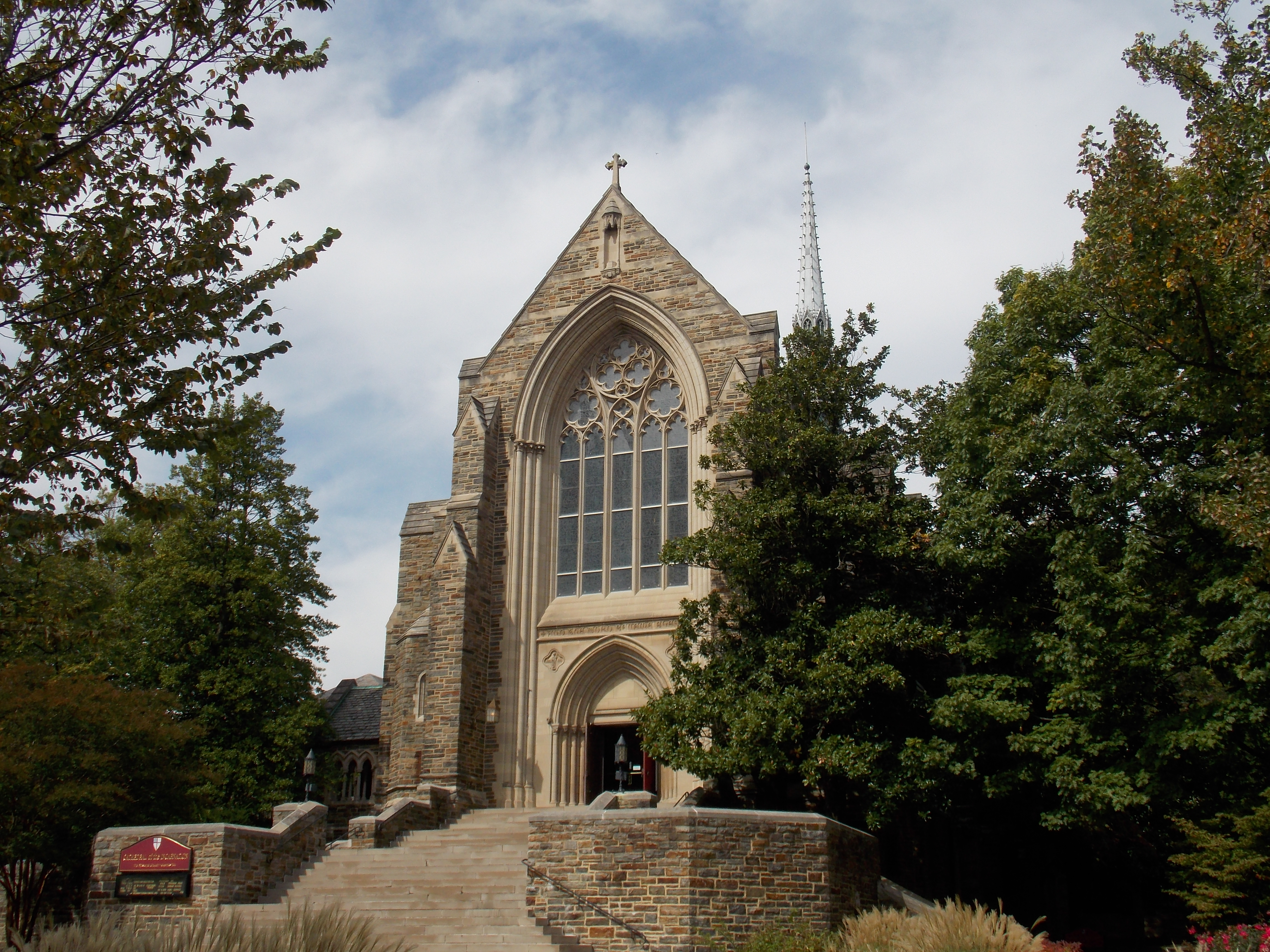
Cathedral of the Incarnation

The Diocese of Maryland is one of the nine original dioceses of the Episcopal Church. It traces its roots to 1608 when Captain John Smith oversaw the first Christian worship in the upper Chesapeake Bay. In 1692, a law passed by the province's general assembly established the Church of England and the colony, which was divided into ten counties, was divided into 30 parishes (See List of the original 30 Anglican parishes in the Province of Maryland). Sometimes the parish church was centrally located; other times multiple churches or chapels served distant population centers within the parish.

In 1780, a meeting in Chestertown, Maryland, in Kent County at Washington College of Anglican clergy and laity led to the formation of the Diocese of Maryland. By 1783, at the end of the American Revolution, the developing diocese had 47 parishes and about 38 clergy (See List of post 1692 Anglican parishes in the Province of Maryland).

In 1789, the Protestant Episcopal Church in the United States of America was founded. The diocese's first bishop, Thomas John Claggett (1743-1816), was the first American bishop of the Episcopal Church consecrated in the country, in 1792 at Trinity Church facing historic Wall Street in New York City. Among notable historical events in the diocese is the first African-American Episcopal congregations in the South, St. James' Church, at Lafayette Square, in west Baltimore. Another first among Maryland's bishops was the election of John Gardner Murray as Presiding Bishop. He was the first elected primate of the Episcopal Church; for his predecessors, the senior member of the House of Bishops, automatically assumed the position.

The diocese has been divided twice. First in 1868, the Eastern Shore counties of Maryland became the Diocese of Easton, causing the Diocese of Maryland to no longer have all of Maryland. Then in 1895, the District of Columbia and adjacent (and increasingly suburban) Montgomery and Prince George's, along with southern Maryland's Charles and St. Mary's counties became the Diocese of Washington.

On March 29, 2008, Eugene Taylor Sutton was elected as the 14th bishop of the diocese; the first African-American to serve in that capacity was consecrated June 28, 2008. In 2014, Heather Cook was the first woman elected to become a bishop in the diocese and she was consecrated as suffragan to Sutton. However, she was placed on administrative leave at the end of 2014 after involvement in a traffic fatality in north Baltimore. Cook was charged with drunk driving, texting while driving, and leaving the scene of the crime, in addition to vehicular manslaughter. On January 22, 2015, the standing committee of the diocese requested that Cook resign her position. This was followed by the Presiding Bishop, Katharine Jefferts Schori, placing formal restrictions on Cook preventing her from presenting herself as an ordained minister of the Episcopal Church. On May 1, 2015, Jefferts Schori announced that both she and the Diocese of Maryland had accepted Cook's resignation as a bishop and as an employee of the diocese. Moreover, both parties reached an accord where Cook received a "Sentence of Disposition" which stripped Cook of her ordained status.

The bishop's seat is at the Cathedral of the Incarnation on University Parkway, between North Charles Street and St. Paul Street in north Baltimore, near the neighborhoods of Roland Park, Guilford and Charles Village.

== Coat of arms ==
The arms of the diocese were designed by Pierre de Chaignon la Rose and were officially adopted at the 133rd diocesan convention in 1916. They consist of a counterchanged Cross of St George, representing the ancestral Church of England; a canton of Lord Baltimore's arms, representing Maryland; and a pheon or arrowhead, taken from the arms of Bishop Claggett.

== Bishops ==
Bishops of Maryland
From	Until	Incumbent	Notes
1792	1816	Thomas John Claggett	First bishop of the Episcopal Church to be consecrated on American soil. Also Chaplain of the United States Senate (1800−1801).
1816	1827	James Kemp	
1830	1838	William Murray Stone	
1840	1879	William Rollinson Whittingham	
1879	1883	William Pinkney	Coadjutor Bishop from 1870.
1885	1911	William Paret	
1911	1929	John Gardner Murray	Also Presiding Bishop of the Episcopal Church (1926−1929).
1929	1943	Edward Trail Helfenstein	Coadjutor Bishop from 1926.
1943	1963	Noble Cilley Powell	Coadjutor Bishop from 1941.
1963	1971	Harry Lee Doll	Coadjutor Bishop from 1960.
1972	1985	David Keller Leighton	Coadjutor Bishop from 1968.
1986	1994	Albert Theodore Eastman	Coadjutor Bishop from 1982.
1995	2007	Robert Wilkes Ihloff	
2008	2024	Eugene Taylor Sutton	
2024	Present	Carrie Schofield-Broadbent	Coadjutor Bishop from 2023.

On 25 March 2023 the Rev. Canon Carrie Schofield-Broadbent was elected bishop coadjutor. She succeeded the Rt. Rev. Eugene Sutton as Bishop of Maryland upon his retirement in 2024 and became the first woman to serve in that role.
