= William Paret =

American bishop

The Right Reverend William Paret D.D., LL.D.
- Bishop of Maryland
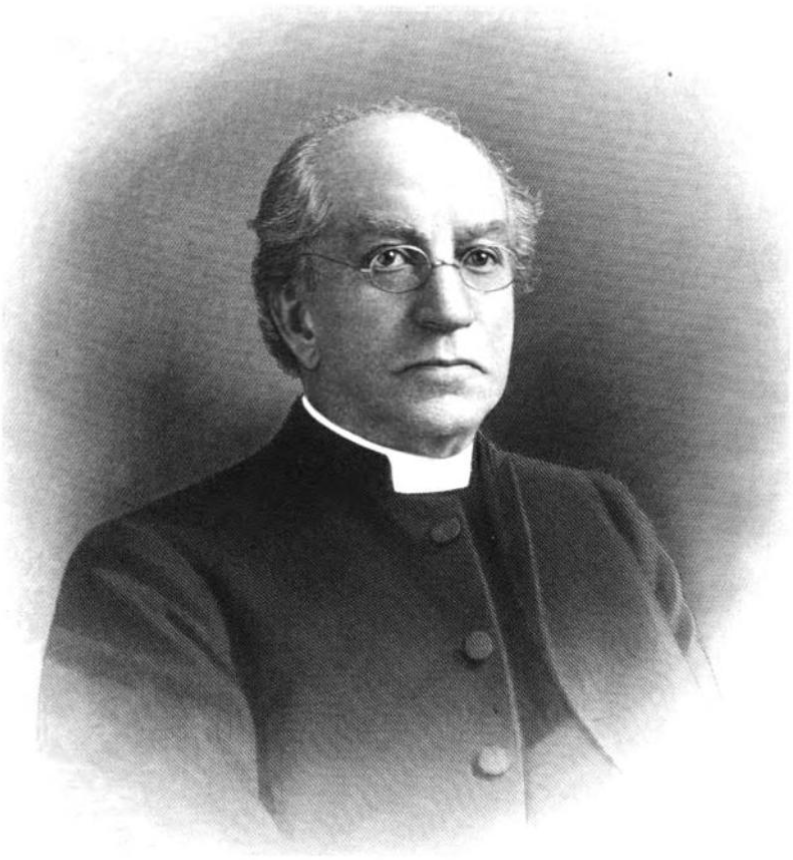
- Church: Episcopal Church
- Diocese: Maryland
- Elected: October 28, 1884
- In office: 1885–1911
- Predecessor: William Pinkney
- Successor: John Gardner Murray

Orders
- Ordination: June 28, 1853 by William H. DeLancey
- Consecration: January 8, 1885 by Alfred Lee

Personal details
- Born: September 23, 1826 New York, New York, U.S.
- Died: January 18, 1911 (aged 84) Baltimore, Maryland, U.S.
- Buried: Rock Creek Cemetery
- Denomination: Anglican
- Spouse: Maria Green Peck (m. 1849) Sarah Elizabeth Hayden (m. 1900)
- Children: 5
- Education: Hobart College (LL.D.)

William Paret (September 23, 1826 – January 18, 1911) was the 137th bishop of the Episcopal Church in the United States of America and was a bishop of the Episcopal Diocese of Maryland.

== Early life and education ==
William Paret was born in New York City on September 23, 1826. His parents were John and Hester Paret. His father was a merchant in that city. His paternal grandfather Stephen Paret, a Frenchman, had come to the United States in 1760. Reared in New York City, he attended grammar school until age 14, at which time he began working as a clerk in a wholesale dry good store. He studied for his orders under the Right Reverend William Heathcote DeLancey. While pursuing his education at Hobart College he also taught in Syracuse, New York, and at the Academy at Moravia, New York. He received his doctorate of divinity degree from Hobart College in 1867. In 1886 Hobart College awarded him his LL.D.

== Ministry ==
William Paret was ordained a deacon on July 2, 1852, in Trinity Church, Geneva, New York, by Bishop Carlton Chase. He received his priest's orders in Grace Church, Rochester, New York, on June 38, 1853, from Bishop DeLancey.

He was rector of these churches:

- St. John's, Clyde, New York, 1852–1854
- Zion, Pierrepont Manor, New York, 1854–1864
- St. Paul's, East Saginaw, Michigan, 1864–1866
- Trinity Church, Elmira, New York, 1866–1888
- Christ Church, Williamsport, Pennsylvania, 1868–1876
- Church of the Epiphany, Washington, D.C., 1876–1884

In 1882, Rev. Paret exchanged public letters concerning church practices with Rev. John Habersham Elliott (1832-1906).

In 1884 Paret was elected to succeed Bishop William Pinkney as Bishop of the Episcopal Diocese of Maryland, following Bishop Pinkney's death in 1883. Paret was consecrated the sixth bishop of Maryland on January 8, 1885, at his own Church of the Epiphany in Washington, D.C. At the Maryland Episcopal Diocesan Convention of 1894, Paret denounced – "a stinging philippic fell from his lips" – those parishes that used incense and other ritualstic practices, such as the use of confessionals, which was an attack on high church Anglican parishes such as Mount Calvary Church in Baltimore and St. Andrew's Church in Princess Anne, Maryland. Those parishes were "practically excommunicated" as Paret refused to visit them. In 1895 the Diocese of Maryland was divided to form the Episcopal Diocese of Washington.

In 1904, the diocese of Maryland published a collection of his pastoral instructions concerning pastoral use of the prayer book. Two years later, T. Whittaker publishers of New York published his The place and function of the Sunday school in the church. G.W. Jacobs Co. of Philadelphia published Paret's Remniscences in the year of his death.

== Personal life ==
Paret married Maria G. Peck in 1849. They had five children. He married Mrs. Sarah H. Haskell on April 21, 1900.

== Death and legacy ==
Bishop Paret died of pneumonia January 18, 1911, in Baltimore. He is buried in Rock Creek Cemetery in Washington, D.C.

Episcopal Church (USA) titles
Preceded by William Pinkney	Bishop of Maryland; 1884-1911	Succeeded by John Gardner Murray
