= Sterntalerhof =

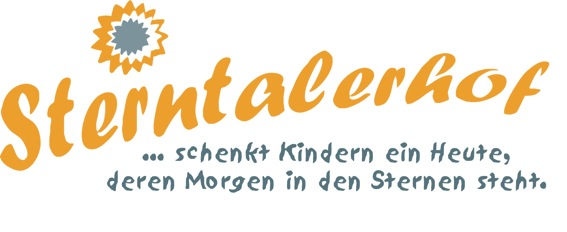
- Company type: Non profit organization
- Founded: 1999
- Founder: Peter Kai and Regina Heimhilcher
- Headquarters: Loipersdorf-Kitzladen, Burgenland (Austria)
- Key people: Mag. Harald Jankovits;
- Revenue: 3,944,301 euro (2022)
- Number of employees: 25 (2022)
- Website: http://www.sterntalerhof.at/en/

Sterntalerhof, established in 1999, is a children's hospice located in Burgenland, Austria. Founded by Deacon Peter Kai and Psychotherapist Regina Heimhilcher, it began as an independent nonprofit charity association on a small farm. The hospice's mission is to provide support to families facing the psychosocial challenges of having a child with a life-threatening or life-limiting illness. Sterntalerhof is designed to be a place of refuge and recovery, offering hope and support to affected families.

The hospice operates on three guiding principles: providing holistic support to seriously, chronically, or terminally ill children and their families; maintaining a dignified and natural environment; and utilizing an interdisciplinary approach, which includes therapies such as equine therapy. Annually, Sterntalerhof cares for over a hundred children and their families, extending support for coping with challenges in home environments through a mobile service system.

== Public Recognition ==
As the Sterntalerhof is funded through donations and has received several accolades:

- Tax deductibility 2009
- Austrian Health Prize 2010
- Peter Kai elected "Austrian of the year" for his humanitarian commitment 2009
- Austrian donation seal of quality 2012

The Sterntalerhof supports of the "Vienna Charity Run".
