= Loipersdorf =

Loipersdorf may refer to:

- Bad Loipersdorf in Hartberg-Fürstenfeld, Styria, Austria.
- Loipersdorf-Kitzladen in Oberwart, Burgenland, Austria.
- A thirteenth-century German language name for Štvrtok na Ostrove in Hungary.
