= Forced displacement =

Coerced movement of a person or persons away from their home or home region

Forcibly displaced people
Total population
- 108.4 million (2022)

Regions with significant populations
- Refugees: 34.6 million
- Internally displaced people: 57.3 million
- Asylum seekers: 2.9 million

Syrian and Iraqi migrants arriving in Lesbos, Greece, in 2015 seeking refuge.

Forced displacement (also forced migration or forced relocation) is an involuntary or coerced movement of a person or people away from their home or home region. The UNHCR defines "forced displacement" as follows: displaced "as a result of persecution, conflict, generalized violence or human rights violations".

A forcibly displaced person may also be referred to as a "forced migrant", a "displaced person" (DP), or, if displaced within the home country, an "internally displaced person" (IDP). While some displaced persons may be considered refugees, the latter term specifically refers to such displaced persons who are receiving legally defined protection and are recognized as such by their country of residence and/or international organizations.

Forced displacement has gained attention in international discussions and policy making since the European migrant crisis. This has since resulted in a greater consideration of the impacts of forced migration on affected regions outside Europe. Various international, regional, and local organizations are developing and implementing approaches to both prevent and mitigate the impact of forced migration in the home regions as well as the receiving or destination regions. Additionally, some collaboration efforts are made to gather evidence in order to seek prosecution of those involved in causing events of human-made forced migration. An estimated 100 million people around the world were forcibly displaced by the end of 2022, with the majority coming from the Global South.

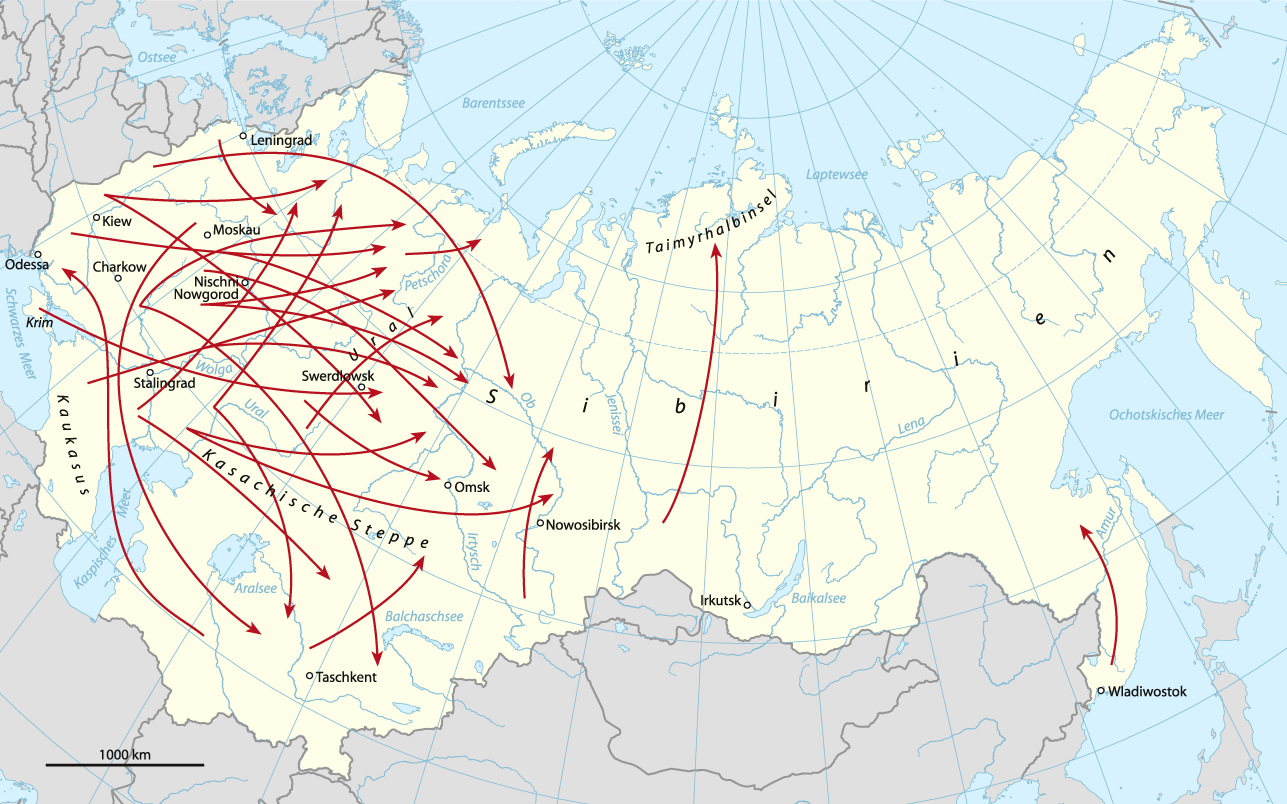
General deportation currents of the dekulakization of the Soviet Union, 1930–1931

== Definitions ==
Governments, NGOs, other international organizations and social scientists have defined forced displacement in a variety of ways. They have generally agreed that it is the forced removal or relocation of a person from their environment and associated connections. It can involve different types of movements, such as flight (from fleeing), evacuation, and population transfer.

- The International Organization for Migration defines a forced migrant as any person migrating to "escape persecution, conflict, repression, natural and human-made disasters, ecological degradation, or other situations that endanger their lives, freedom or livelihood".
- According to UNESCO, forced displacement is "the forced movement of people from their locality or environment and occupational activities," with its leading cause being armed conflict.
- According to researcher Alden Speare, even movement under immediate threat to life contains a voluntary element as long as an option exists going into hiding, or attempting to avoid persecution. According to him "migration can be considered to be involuntary only when a person is physically transported from a country and has no opportunity to escape from those transporting him [or her]." This viewpoint has come under scrutiny when considering direct and indirect factors which may leave migrants with little to no choice in their decisions, such as imminent threats to life and livelihood.

=== Distinctions between the different concepts ===
- A migrant who fled their home because of economic hardship is an economic migrant, and strictly speaking, not a displaced person.
- If the displaced person was forced out of their home because of economically driven projects, such as the Three Gorges Dam in China, the situation is referred to as development-induced displacement.
- A displaced person who left their home region because of political persecution or violence, but did not cross an international border, commonly falls into the looser category of internally displaced person (IDP), subject to more tenuous international protection. In 1998, the UN Commission on Human Rights published the Guiding Principles on Internal Displacement, defining internally displaced people as: "persons or groups of persons who have been forced or obliged to flee or leave their homes or places of habitual residence in particular as a result of or in order to avoid the effects of armed conflict, situations of generalized violence, violations of human rights, or natural or human-made disasters and who have not crossed an internationally recognized State border."
- If the displaced person has crossed an international border and falls under one of the relevant international legal instruments, they may be able to apply for asylum and can become a refugee if the application is successful. Although often incorrectly used as a synonym for displaced person, the term refugee refers specifically to a legally recognized status that has access to specific legal protections. Loose application of the term refugee may cause confusion between the general descriptive class of displaced persons and those who can legally be defined as refugees.
- Some forced migrants may, due to the country of residence's legal system, be unable to apply for asylum in that country. Thus, even though they meet the international law definition of a refugee they are unable to claim asylum and become recognised by their host country as refugees.
- A displaced person crossing an international border without permission from the country they are entering or without subsequently applying for asylum may be considered an illegal immigrant.
- Forced migrants are always either IDPs or displaced people, as both of these terms do not require a legal framework and the fact that they left their homes is sufficient. The distinction between the terms displaced person and forced migrant is minor; however, the term displaced person has an important historic context (e.g. World War II).

==== History of the term displaced person ====
The term displaced person (DP) was first widely used during World War II, following the subsequent refugee outflows from Eastern Europe. Although DP began as a synonym for refugee, the Office of Military Government, United States differentiated the terms. While refugees were almost always a citizen of the country they were in, DPs were always a citizen of a member of the United Nations; enemy aliens were not DPs regardless of location. In this context, DP specifically referred to an individual removed from their native country as a prisoner or a slave laborer. Most war victims, political refugees, and DPs of the immediate post-Second World War period were Ukrainians, Poles, other Slavs, and citizens of the Baltic states (Lithuanians, Latvians, and Estonians) who refused to return to Soviet-dominated Eastern Europe. A. J. Jaffe claimed that the term was originally coined by Eugene M. Kulischer. The meaning has significantly broadened in the past half-century.

== Causes and examples ==
Bogumil Terminski distinguishes two general categories of displacement:

- Displacement of risk: mostly conflict-induced displacement, deportations and disaster-induced displacement.
- Displacement of adaptation: associated with voluntary migration, development-induced displacement and environmentally induced displacement.

=== Natural causes ===
Forced displacement may directly result from natural disasters and indirectly from the subsequent impact on infrastructure, food and water access, and local/regional economies. Displacement may be temporary or permanent, depending on the scope of the disaster and the area's recovery capabilities. Climate change is increasing the frequency of major natural disasters, possibly placing a greater number of populations in situations of forced displacement. Also crop failures due to blight and/or pests fall within this category by affecting people's access to food. Additionally, the term environmental refugee represents people who are forced to leave their traditional habitat because of environmental factors which negatively impact their livelihood, or even environmental disruption i.e. biological, physical or chemical change in ecosystem. Migration can also occur as a result of slow-onset climate change, such as desertification or sea-level rise, of deforestation or land degradation.

==== Examples of forced displacement caused by natural disasters ====
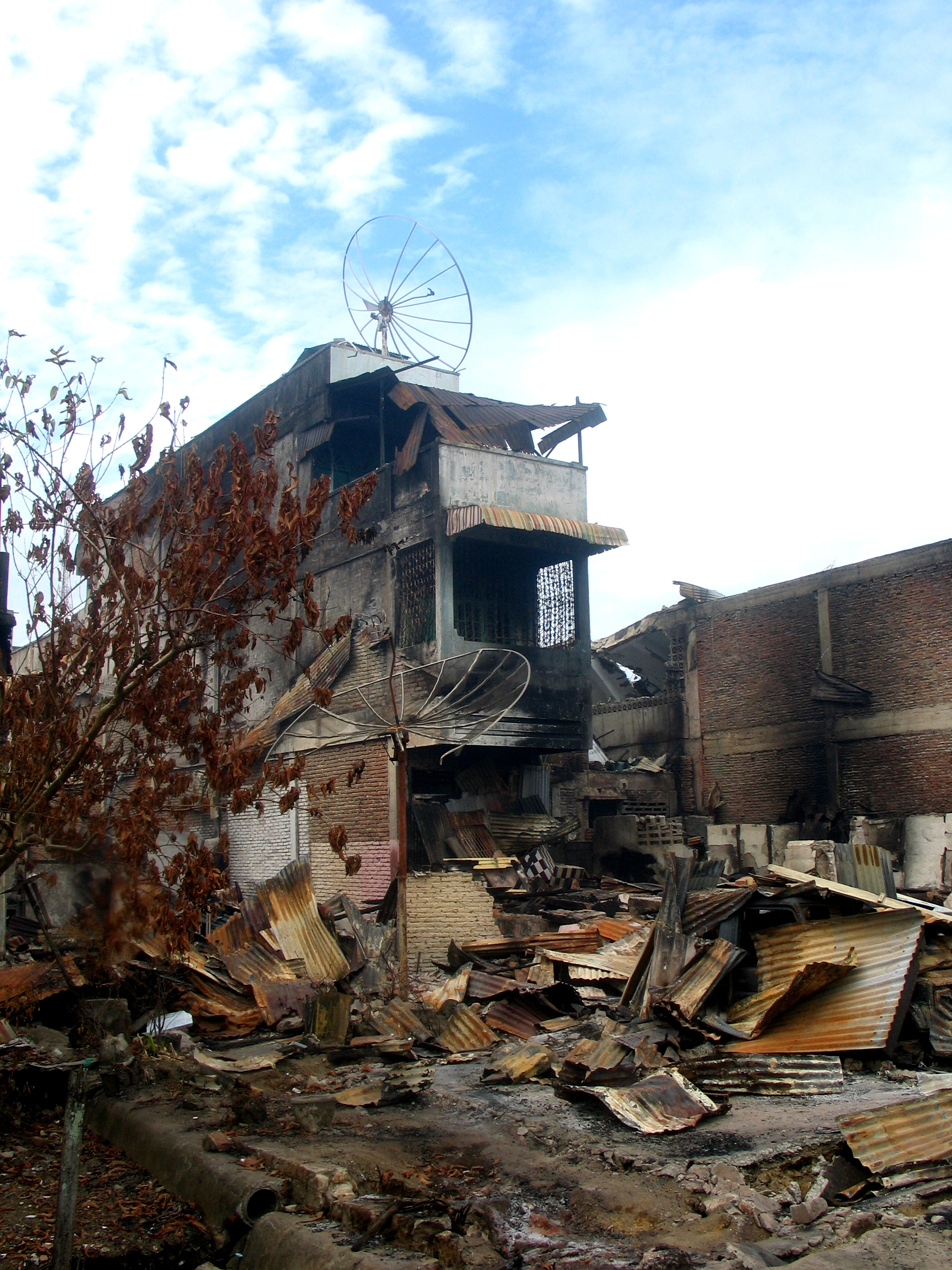
Damage to residence in Nias, Indonesia from the December 2004 Indian Ocean tsunami

- January 2025 Southern California wildfires: LA Fires displacing approximately 200,000 people.
- 2004 Indian Ocean tsunami: Resulting from a 9.1 earthquake off the coast of North Sumatra, the Indian Ocean Tsunami claimed over 227,898 lives, heavily damaging coastlines throughout the Indian Ocean. As a result, over 1.7 million people were displaced, mostly from Indonesia, Sri Lanka, and India.
- Hurricane Katrina (2005): Striking New Orleans, Louisiana, in late August 2005, Hurricane Katrina inflicted approximately US$125 billion in damages, standing as one of the costliest storms in United States history. As a result of the damage inflicted by Katrina, over one million people were internally displaced. One month after the disaster, over 600,000 remained displaced. Immediately following the disaster, New Orleans lost approximately half of its population, with many residents displaced to cities such as Houston, Dallas, Baton Rouge, and Atlanta. According to numerous studies, displacement disproportionally impacted Louisiana's poorer populations, specifically African Americans.
- 2011 East Africa drought: Failed rains in Somalia, Kenya, and Ethiopia led to high livestock and crop losses, driving majority pastoralist populations to surrounding areas in search of accessible food and water. In addition to seeking food and water, local populations' migration was motivated by an inability to maintain traditional lifestyles. According to researchers, although partly influenced by local armed conflict, the East African drought stands as an example of climate change impacts.

=== Human-made causes ===
Human-made displacement describes forced displacement caused by political entities, criminal organizations, conflicts, human-made environmental disasters, development, etc. Although impacts of natural disasters and blights/pests may be exacerbated by human mismanagement, human-made causes refer specifically to those initiated by humans. According to UNESCO, armed conflict stands as the most common cause behind forced displacement, reinforced by regional studies citing political and armed conflict as the largest attributing factors to migrant outflows from Latin America, Africa, and Asia.

==== Examples of forced displacement caused by criminal activity ====
- Displacement in Mexico due to cartel violence: Throughout Mexico, drug cartel, paramilitary, and self-defense group violence drives internal and external displacement. According to a comprehensive, mixed methodology study by Salazar and Álvarez Lobato, families fled their homes as a means of survival, hoping to escape homicide, extortion, and potential kidnapping. Using a collection of available data and existing studies, the total number of displaced persons between 2006 and 2012 was approximately 740,000.
- Displacement in Central America due to cartel/gang violence: A major factor behind US immigrant crises in the early 21st century (such as the 2014 immigrant crisis), rampant gang violence in the Northern Triangle, combined with corruption and low economic opportunities, has forced many to flee their country in pursuit of stability and greater opportunity. Homicide rates in countries such as El Salvador and Honduras reached some of the highest in the world, with El Salvador peaking at 103 homicides per 100,000 people. Contributing factors include extortion, territorial disputes, and forced gang recruitment, resulting in some estimates of approximately 500,000 people displaced annually.
- Displacement in Colombia due to conflict and drug-related violence: According to researchers Mojica and Eugenia, Medellín, Colombia around 2013 exemplified crime and violence-induced forced displacement, standing as one of the most popular destinations for IDPs while also producing IDPs of its own. Rural citizens fled from organized criminal violence, with the majority pointing to direct threats as the main driving force, settling in Medellín in pursuit of safety and greater opportunity. Within Medellín, various armed groups battled for territorial control, forcing perceived opponents from their homes and pressuring residents to abandon their livelihoods, among other methods. All in all, criminal violence forced Colombians to abandon their possessions, way of life, and social ties in pursuit of safety.

==== Examples of forced displacement caused by political conflict ====
- During the Armenian Genocide (1915), 1.5 million Armenians were displaced in death marches from Ottoman-controlled Western Armenia to Syria, Palestine, and elsewhere
- 1949–1956 Palestinian exodus
- 1950-1951 exodus of Turks from Bulgaria: according to some, caused because the Turkish support of the USA during the Korean War. Communist ideologies, Islamophobia and Anti-Turkism also played a role.
- Jewish exodus from the Muslim world
- Vietnam War: Throughout the Vietnam War and in the years preceding it, many populations were forced out of Vietnam and the surrounding countries as a result of armed conflict and/or persecution by their governments, such as the Socialist Republic of Vietnam. This event is referred to as the Indochina refugee crisis, with millions displaced across Asia, Australia, Europe, and North America.
- Salvadoran Civil War: Throughout and after the 12-year conflict between the Salvadoran government and the FMLN, Salvadorans faced forced displacement as a result of combat, persecution, and deteriorating quality of life/access to socioeconomic opportunities. Overall, one in four Salvadorans were internally and externally displaced (over one million people).
- 2021 Myanmar coup d'état: Since the coup d’état of 1 February 2021, the Burmese military's ascendancy into power has resulted in widespread chaos and violence, aggravated by the refusal of large sections of the public to accept a military regime given the country's experiences during the second half of the 20th and early years of the 21st century. As a result, many in the public sector have initiated strikes, and the country has seen elevated levels of forced displacement, both internally displaced persons (IDPs) (208,000 since 1 February 2021) and refugees fleeing abroad (an estimated 22,000 since 1 February 2021). The particular political conflict causing the displacement has been flagged as symptomatic of that of a state on the brink of collapse. Two key indicators of this that have been highlighted are firstly, that levels of security have been severely reduced to the point where citizens are no longer protected from violence by the state; and secondly, goods and services are not being reliably supplied to citizens either by the ousted government or by the new military leadership, primarily as a result of the instability created and the strikes triggered. These internal problems are further reflected by the withdrawal of international recognition by both governmental and non-governmental bodies.
- Gaza Strip evacuations, since the start of the Israeli invasion of the Gaza Strip on 27 October 2023, over 85% of the population has been displaced.
- 2023 Expulsion of Nagorno-Karabakh Armenians: Azerbaijan launched a military offensive in September 2023 on the Armenian-populated region of Nagorno-Karabakh (Artsakh), following a ten-month military siege, involving the sabotage of public infrastructure and the blockade of essential supplies, which caused a humanitarian crisis. Before the Second Nagorno-Karabakh War in 2020, the region had an estimated population of 150,000 which decreased in the aftermath of the war. Faced with extreme anti-Armenian sentiment and threats of violence, over 100,000 ethnic Armenians — representing 99% of the remaining population of Nagorno-Karabakh, — fled to Armenia, triggering a refugee crisis. Observers, including international leaders and human rights organizations, have characterized the displacement as ethnic cleansing or a crime against humanity. Armenia has struggled to absorb and support the incoming refugees, facing acute challenges in funding, housing, and long-term integration for those uprooted.

==== Examples of forced displacement caused by human-made environmental disasters ====
- 2019 Amazon rainforest wildfires: Although human-made fires are a normal part of Amazonian agriculture, the 2019 dry season saw an internationally noted increase in their rate of occurrence. The rapidly spreading fires, combined with efforts from agricultural and logging companies, has forced Brazil's indigenous populations off their native lands.
- Chernobyl disaster: A nuclear meltdown on April 26, 1986, near Pripyat, Ukraine contaminated the city and surrounding areas with harmful levels of radiation, forcing the displacement of over 100,000 people.
- Great Famine of Ireland: Between 1845 and 1849, potato blight, exacerbated by policy decisions and mismanagement by the U.K. government, caused millions of Irish people, largely potato-dependent tenant farmers, to starve or eventually flee the country. Over one million perished from subsequent famine and disease, and another million fled the country, reducing the overall Irish population by at least a quarter.

==== Other human-made displacement ====
- Human trafficking/smuggling: Migrants displaced through deception or coercion with purpose of their exploitation fall under this category. Due to its clandestine nature, the data on such type of forced migration are limited. A disparity also exists between the data for male trafficking (such as for labor in agriculture, construction etc.) and female trafficking (such as for sex work or domestic service), with more data available for males. The International Labour Organization considers trafficking an offense against labor protection, denying companies from leveraging migrants as a labor resource. ILO's Multilateral Framework includes principle no. 11, recommending that "Governments should formulate and implement, in consultation with the social partners, measures to prevent abusive practices, migrant smuggling and people trafficking; they should also work towards preventing irregular labor migration."
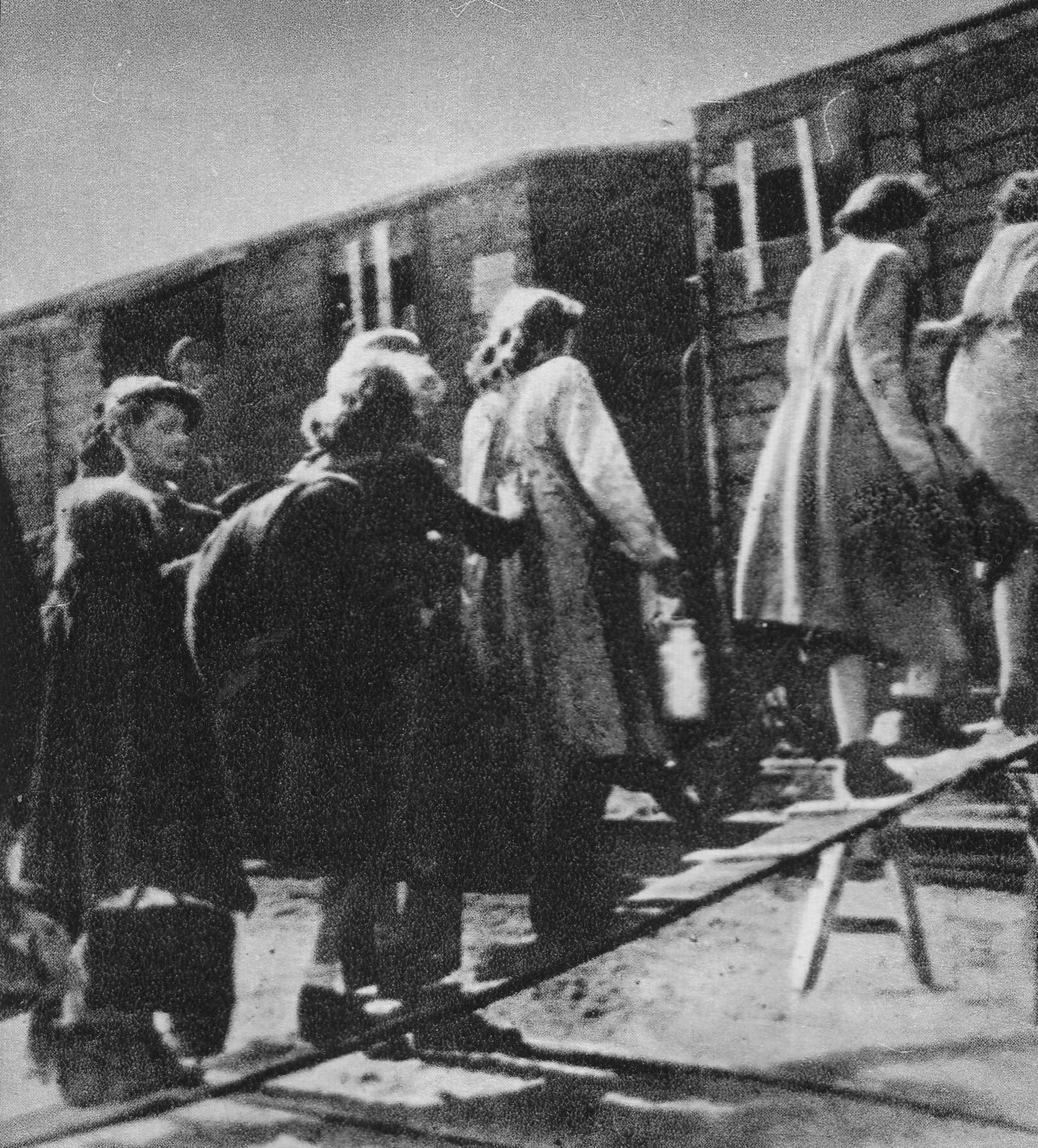
  Jews forcibly displaced by the Nazi regime during Germany's WWII occupation of Poland, loaded onto trains for transport to concentration camps.
- Slavery: Historically, slavery has led to the displacement of individuals for forced labor, with the Middle Passage of the 15th through 19th century Atlantic slave trade standing as a notable example. Of the 20 million Africans captured for the trade, half died in their forced march to the African coast, and another ten to twenty percent died on slave ships carrying them from Africa to the Americas.
- Ethnic cleansing: The systematic removal of ethnic or religious groups from a territory with the intent of making it ethnically homogeneous. Examples include the Catholic removal of Salzburg Protestants, the removal of Jewish people during the Holocaust, and the deportation of North American indigenous peoples (e.g., Trail of Tears).
- Suppressing political opposition: For example, the forced settlements in the Soviet Union and population transfer in the Soviet Union including deportation of the Crimean Tatars, deportation of the Chechens and Ingush, deportation of Koreans in the Soviet Union, deportation of the Soviet Greeks, and deportations of the Ingrian Finns.
- Aligning ethnic composition with artificial political border: For example Flight and expulsion of Germans (1944–1950), Polish population transfers (1944–1946), and Operation Vistula.
- Colonization: For example, the British governments transportation of Convicts in Australia, American Colonization Society and others' attempt to create a country for African Americans in Africa as Liberia, Japanese settlers in Manchukuo following Japanese invasion of Manchuria, and the Chinese military settlement of Xinjiang Production and Construction Corps in Xinjiang.
- Forced displacement created by anti-trans and anti-LGBT laws.

=== Multiple and interacting drivers ===
Recent research highlights that displacement is increasingly driven by a “polycrisis”, in which conflict, climate change and economic shocks interact and reinforce each other, creating complex and protracted dynamics, particularly in Africa, which hosts around 45 million displaced people (approximately 43% of the global total).

Examples of displacement in polycrisis contexts include parts of the Sahel and the Horn of Africa, where armed conflict, climate variability (including drought), and economic instability interact to drive large-scale and often protracted displacement. In these regions, overlapping crises can erode livelihoods, weaken state capacity, and increase vulnerability, making displacement both more likely and more difficult to resolve.

== Conditions faced by displaced persons ==
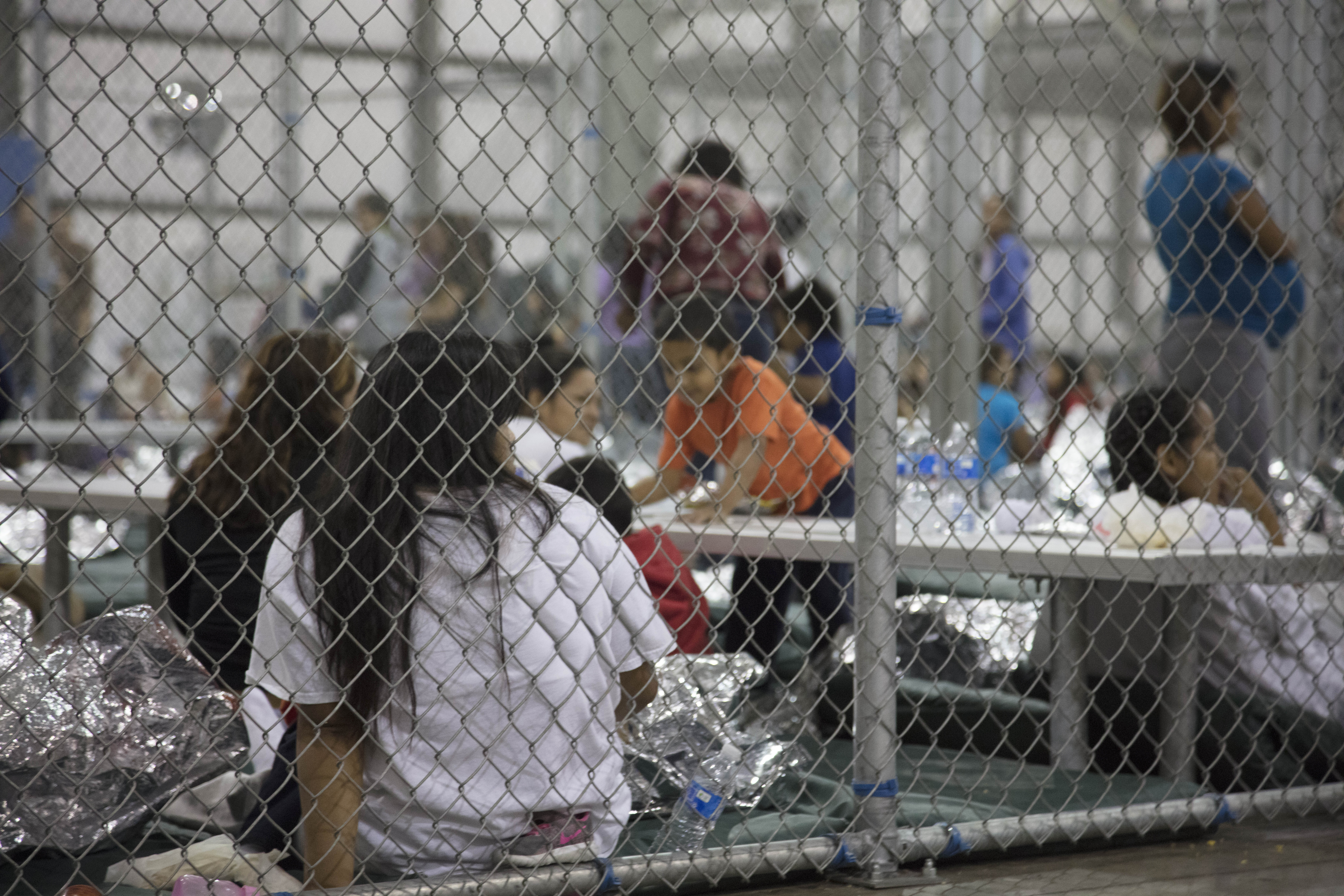
Children of undocumented immigrants from Latin America to the United States detained in the Ursula Detention Center, McAllen, Texas, June 2017

Displaced persons face adverse conditions when taking the decision to leave, traveling to a destination, and sometimes upon reaching their destination. Displaced persons are often forced to place their lives at risk, travel in inhumane conditions, and may be exposed to exploitation and abuse. These risk factors may increase through the involvement of smugglers and human traffickers, who may exploit them for illegal activities such as drug/weapons trafficking, forced labor, or sex work. The states where migrants seek protection may consider them a threat to national security. Displaced persons may also seek the assistance of human smugglers (such as coyotes in Latin America) throughout their journey. Given the illegal nature of smuggling, smugglers may take use dangerous methods to reach their destination without capture, exposing displaced persons to harm and sometimes resulting in deaths. Examples include abandonment, exposure to exploitation, dangerous transportation conditions, and death from exposure to harsh environments.

In most instances of forced migration across borders, migrants do not possess the required documentation for legal travel. The states where migrants seek protection may consider them a threat to national security. As a result, displaced persons may face detainment and criminal punishment, as well as physical and psychological trauma. Various studies focusing on migrant health have specifically linked migration to increased likelihood of depression, anxiety, and other psychological troubles. For example, the United States has faced criticism for its recent policies regarding migrant detention, specifically the detention of children. Critics point to poor detention conditions, unstable contact with parents, and high potential for long-term trauma as reasons for seeking policy changes. Displaced persons risk greater poverty than before displacement, financial vulnerability, and potential social disintegration, in addition to other risks related to human rights, culture, and quality of life. Forced displacement has varying impacts, dependent on the means through which one was forcibly displaced, their geographic location, their protected status, and their ability to personally recover. Under the most common form of displacement, armed conflict, individuals often lose possession of their assets upon fleeing and possible upon arrival to a new country, where they can also face cultural, social, and economic discontinuity.

== Responses to forced displacement ==
=== International response ===
Responses to situations of forced displacement vary across regional and international levels, with each type of forced displacement demonstrating unique characteristics and the need for a considerate approach. At the international level, international organizations (e.g. the UNHCR), NGOs (Doctors without Borders), and country governments (USAID) may work towards directly or indirectly ameliorating these situations. Means may include establishing internationally recognized protections, providing clinics to migrant camps, and supplying resources to populations. According to researchers such as Francis Deng, as well as international organizations such as the UN, an increase in IDPs compounds the difficulty of international responses, posing issues of incomplete information and questions regarding state sovereignty. State sovereignty especially becomes of concern when discussing protections for IDPs, who are within the borders of a sovereign state, placing reluctance in the international community's ability to respond. Multiple landmark conventions aim at providing rights and protections to the different categories of forcibly displaced persons, including the 1951 Refugee Convention, the 1967 Protocol, the Kampala Convention, and the 1998 Guiding Principles. Despite internationally cooperation, these frameworks rely on the international system, which states may disregard. In a 2012 study, Young Hoon Song found that nations "very selectively" responded to instances of forced migration and internally displaced persons.

World organizations such as the United Nations and the World Bank, as well as individual countries, sometimes directly respond to the challenges faced by displaced people, providing humanitarian assistance or forcibly intervening in the country of conflict. Disputes related to these organizations' neutrality and limited resources has affected the capabilities of international humanitarian action to mitigate mass displacement mass displacement's causes. These broad forms of assistance sometimes do not fully address the multidimensional needs of displaced persons. Regardless, calls for multilateral responses echo across organizations in the face of falling international cooperation. These organizations propose more comprehensive approaches, calling for improved conflict resolution and capacity-building in order to reduce instances of forced displacement.

=== Local response ===
Responses at multiple levels and across sectors is vital. A research has for instance highlighted the importance of collaboration between businesses and non-governmental organizations to tackle resettlement and employment issues.

Lived in experiences of displaced persons will vary according to the state and local policies of their country of relocation. Policies reflecting national exclusion of displaced persons may be undone by inclusive urban policies. Sanctuary cities are an example of spaces that regulate their cooperation or participation with immigration law enforcement. The practice of urban membership upon residence allows displaced persons to have access to city services and benefits, regardless of their legal status. Sanctuary cities have been able to provide migrants with greater mobility and participation in activities limiting the collection of personal information, issuing identification cards to all residents, and providing access to crucial services such as health care. Access to these services can ease the hardships of displaced people by allowing them to healthily adjust to life after displacement.

=== Criminal prosecution ===
Forced displacement has been the subject of several trials in local and international courts. For an offense to classify as a war crime, the civilian victim must be a "protected person" under international humanitarian law. Originally referring only categories of individuals explicitly protected under one of the four Geneva Conventions of 1949, "protected person" now refers to any category of individuals entitled to protection under specific law of war treaties.

In Article 49, the Fourth Geneva Convention, adopted on 12 August 1949, specifically forbade forced displacement

Individual or mass forcible transfers, as well as deportations of protected persons from occupied territory to the territory of the Occupying Power or to that of any other country, occupied or not, are prohibited, regardless of their motive.

The Rome Statute of the International Criminal Court defines forced displacement as a crime within the jurisdiction of the court:

"Deportation or forcible transfer of population" means forced displacement of the people concerned by expulsion or other coercive acts from the area in which they are lawfully present, without grounds permitted under international law.

- Following the end of World War II, the Krupp trial was held with a specific charge to the forced displacement of enemy civilian populations for the purpose of forced labor. The US Military Tribunal concluded that "[t]here is no international law that permits the deportation or the use of civilians against their will for other than on reasonable requisitions for the need of the army, either within the area of the army or after deportation to rear areas or to the homeland of the occupying power".
- At the Nuremberg trials, Hans Frank, chief jurist in occupied Poland, was found guilty, among others for forced displacement of the civilian population.
- Several people were tried and convicted by the International Criminal Tribunal for the former Yugoslavia (ICTY) for connection to forced displacement during the Yugoslav Wars in the 1990s. On 11 April 2018, the Appeals Chamber sentenced Vojislav Šešelj 10 years in prison under Counts 1, 10, and 11 of the indictment for instigating deportation, persecution (forcible displacement), and other inhumane acts (forcible transfer) as crimes against humanity due to his speech in Hrtkovci on 6 May 1992, in which he called for the expulsion of Croats from Vojvodina. Other convictions for forced displacement included ex-Bosnian Serb politician Momčilo Krajišnik, ex-Croatian Serb leader Milan Martić, former Bosnian Croat paramilitary commander Mladen Naletilić, and Bosnian Serb politician Radoslav Brđanin.
- On 17 March 2023, the International Criminal Court (ICC) issued arrest warrants for Vladimir Putin and Russia's Commissioner for Children's Rights Maria Lvova-Belova for war crimes of deportation and illegal transfer of children from occupied Ukraine to Russia.

== See also ==
- Asylum seekers
- Development-induced displacement
- Deportation
- Displaced persons camps in post-World War II Europe
- Divided family
- Ethnic cleansing
- Forced displacement in popular culture
- International Association for the Study of Forced Migration
- Kampala Convention
- Population cleansing
- Population transfer
- Refugee
- List of areas depopulated due to climate change
