= Society of All Saints Sisters of the Poor =

The Society of All Saints Sisters of the Poor is a religious order of sisters in the Anglican Communion. It was founded in 1851 and is active in England and the United States.

In 2009 all but two of the American sisters were received into the Roman Catholic Church and the Roman Catholic All Saints Sisters of the Poor became a religious institute in 2011.

== History ==
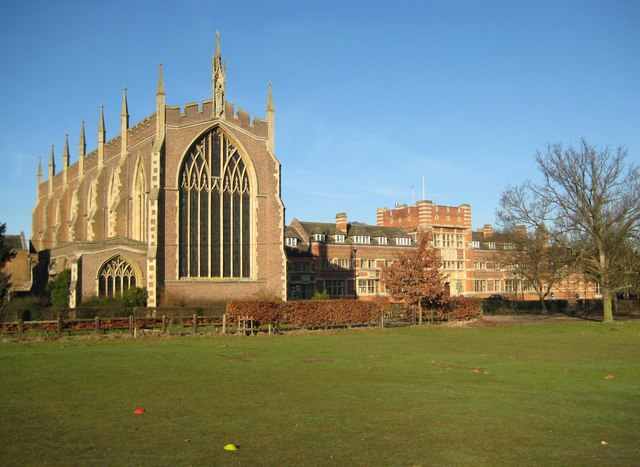
The former All Saints Convent at London Colney

The Society was established in 1851 in the parish of All Saints, Margaret Street in London by Harriet Brownlow Byron. The sisters were employed in parish work, particularly among the poor and underprivileged. The convent in Margaret Street, Westminster, still stands; the convent chapel by G. E. Street (1860) is Grade II listed.

In 1879, Father Richard Meux Benson invited the All Saints Sisters to Cowley in east Oxford to run the St John's Home hospital. The foundation stone for St John's Home was laid by Prince Leopold, Duke of Albany (son of Queen Victoria) in 1873. In Oxford, the Sisters continued with similar parish work. Michael Ramsey, the former archbishop of Canterbury, died in the St John's Home in 1989. In July 2014, the sisters of the All Saints Convent in Cowley, welcomed into one part of their buildings the Conventual Franciscans who made it a formation centre.

The foundation stone for a new All Saints Convent at London Colney near St Albans, Hertfordshire, was laid by the Bishop of St Albans in 1899. The building was completed in 1901 to the design of Leonard Stokes. The chapel was added between 1921 and 1928 to the design of Sir Ninian Comper (1864-1960), and extended by his son Sebastian Comper between 1960 and 1964. The site was sold in 1973.

== Current work ==
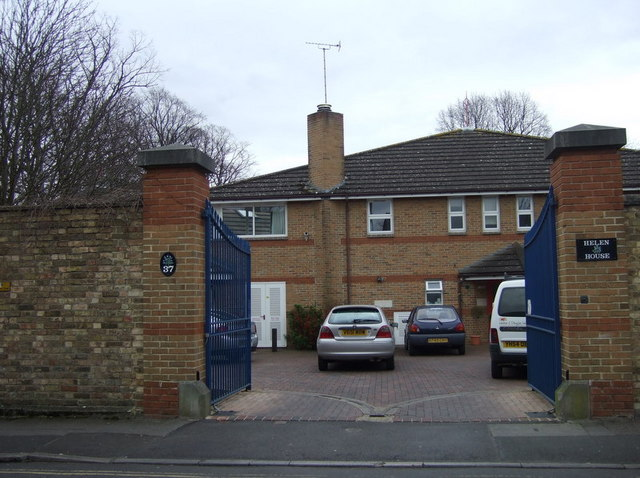
Helen House in east Oxford

Sister Frances Dominica (Frances Ritchie) and the Order founded in 1982 and continue to run "Helen House", the world's first children's hospice for sick and terminally ill children. It also runs "St John's Home", a nursing home for the elderly and infirm. The sisters continue the care of the homeless through "The Porch" shelter and feeding centre.

"Douglas House", opened in 2004 and cared for terminally ill young adults aged 16 to 35. It was the world’s first specialist hospice exclusively for young adults. Douglas House closed on 21 June 2018.

== United States ==
An American congregation was established in Baltimore in 1872, having been invited to the United States by Joseph Richey, rector of Mount Calvary Church, and it became an autonomous province of the Society in 1890. Together with Mount Calvary Church, the sisters founded Joseph Richey House, a hospice, in 1987.

In 2009 the majority of the members were received into the Roman Catholic Church. One sister (Sister Virginia) remained Anglican, and the sole member (in vows) of the American province of the Society. The Anglican and Roman Catholic sisters still live together in their convent in Catonsville, Maryland. The community of Roman Catholic All Saints sisters was canonically erected as a religious institute on 1 November 2011. As of 2015, there were ten members in the American institute.

== See also ==
- Granville M. Williams, SSJE, chaplain to the American community 1939-1969
