= Chantry Island, Hertfordshire =

Place in Hertfordshire, England

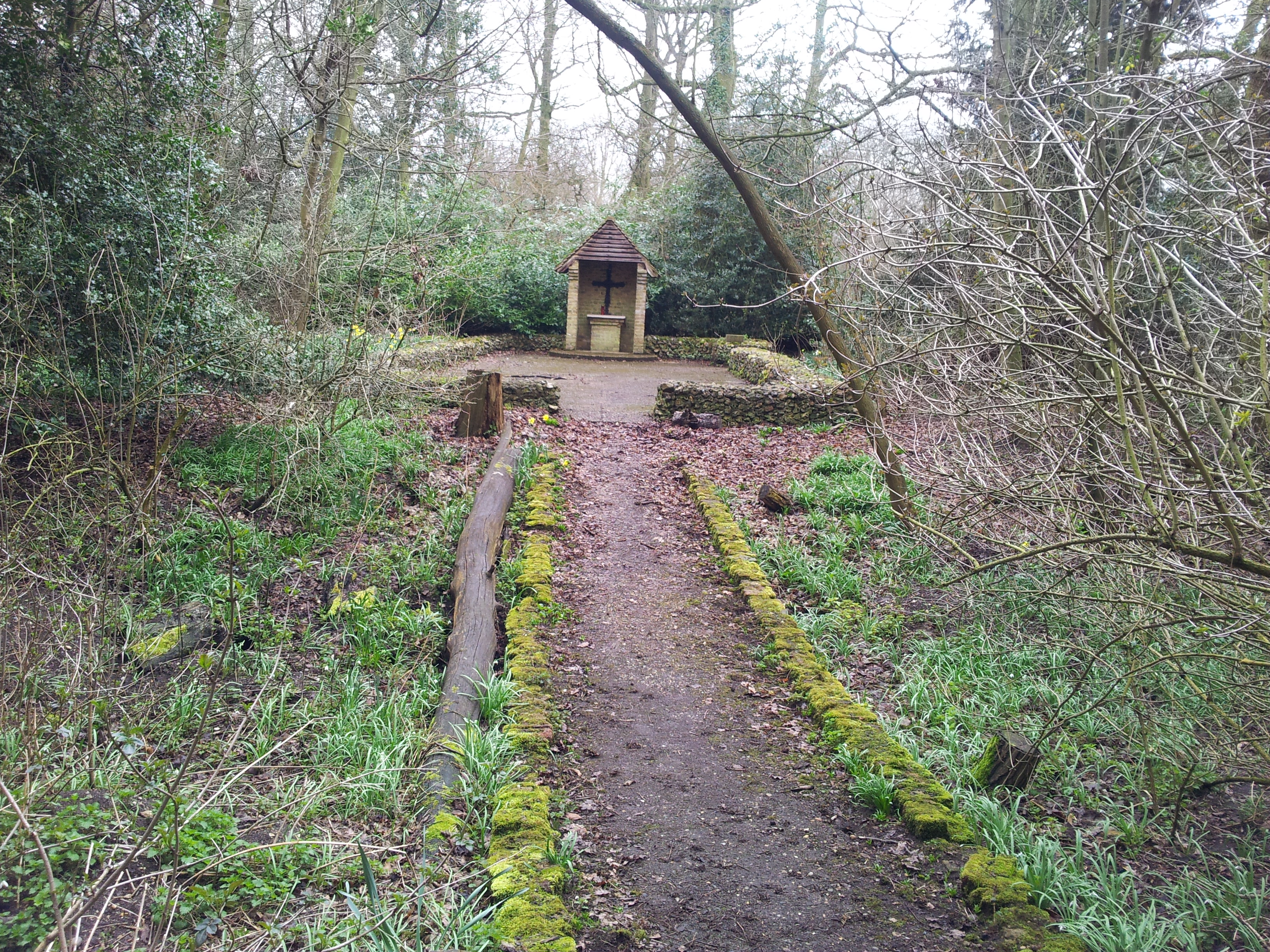
A small shrine on Chantry Island

Chantry Island is currently a small (5,300sq.m.) deciduously wooded area with a narrow, and now dry, moat, giving the impression that it is an island. It is located in the grounds of the former All Saints Pastoral Centre in London Colney, Hertfordshire.

Chantry Island is famous as being the alleged place of arrest of Saint Alban, the first Christian martyr in what is now the United Kingdom.

The local legend associated with the island is that Alban had harboured a fugitive priest at his home on Chantry Island and, when they heard of the impending arrival of Roman soldiers, Alban changed clothes with the priest so that he himself, and not the priest, would be arrested. Alban was arrested, and taken to nearby Verulamium, where he would later be martyred. Verulamium was later renamed St Albans in his honour.

The chantry chapel on the island is first mentioned in land records around 1100 AD. It was then dedicated to St John the Baptist. The chapel fell into disuse in 1471. The remains of the chapel built on Chantry Island became a site of local pilgrimage and, in about 1920, some restoration workers rebuilt the walls to a height of about 60 cm.
