= Eugene M. Kulischer =

Russian-American sociologist

Eugene Mikhailovich Kulischer (Russian: Евгений Михайлович Кулишер; September 4, 1881 – April 2, 1956) was a Russian-American sociologist; an authority on demography, migration and manpower; and an expert on Russia. He also coined the phrase "displaced persons" and was among the first to seek to document the number of persons murdered in the Holocaust and the subsequent migrations of millions of Europeans after World War II.

== Biography ==
Born in Kyiv in 1881, he died in Washington, DC, on April 2, 1956. Like his father, Michael Kulischer, a noted Russian historian, he insisted that no migration occurs in isolation. Along with his brother Alexander, he worked on Kriegs- und Wanderzüge, Weltgeschichte als Völkerbewegung [War and Migration; World History as Peoples' Movements], published in German only by de Gruyter in 1932, and Europe on the Move: War and Population Changes, 1917–1947, commissioned by the International Labour Organization and published in 1948. Both books that were intended to show that migrations and wars go hand-in-hand.

Kulischer was himself an example of a displaced person. Following the Russian Revolution (1917), he fled Russia for Germany in 1920. Following the collapse of the Weimar Republic, he fled Germany for Denmark. In 1936, he went to Paris. In 1941, he "crossed clandestinely the demarcation line between the occupied and the unoccupied parts of France" and went to the United States. His brother Alexander, "when crossing the demarcation line, was arrested by Pétain's gendarmes and died in a concentration camp."

== Work ==
In the United States, he “served successively as consultant or staff member of the International Labor Office, the Office of Strategic Services, the Bureau of the Census, the Department of the Army, and the Library of Congress." At the heart of his work is a simple axiom: individual short-distance movements have a combined action that creates great population shifts. An expansion of that concept is his oft-quoted dictum:

"The migratory movement is at once perpetual, partial, and universal. It never ceases, it affects every people, but at a given moment it sets in motion only a small number of each population; hence the illusion of immobility. In fact, there is never a moment of immobility for any people, because no migration remains isolated".

With that paragraph, he created a bridge linking the migration of individuals and the demographic fact of great migrations. He and his brother, along with millions of others, tried to put Europe as far behind them as they could on the eve of World War II. All of them had their own reasons. Some left because of their ethnicity, others because of their religion. Some left because of their politics, others because they feared the upheaval that they knew to loom on the horizon.

For Kulischer and his brother, their reasons for moving were simple. They were Jewish and forecast the outcome of World War II based on demographic trends. They reasoned that the Soviets and the Germans were on a collision course and that the Germans would lose.

"Man's history," Kulischer remarked, "is the story of his wanderings". From the standpoint of the sociology of knowledge, he added, "Most scholars are rooted in their environment. They differ in their ability to outgrow it."

As Jackson and Howe recently observed in evaluating the migrations' impact:

E. M. Kulischer once reminded his readers that in A.D. 900 Berlin had no Germans, Moscow had no Russians, Budapest had no Hungarians, Madrid was a Moorish settlement, and Constantinople had hardly any Turks. He added that the Normans had not yet settled in Great Britain and before the sixteenth century there were no Europeans living in North or South America, Australia, New Zealand, or South Africa.

== Publications ==
Kulischer published several books including the following:

- 1932. Kriegs- und Wanderzüge. Weltgeschichte als Völkerbewegung. With Alexander Kulischer. Berlin/Leipzig 1932.
- 1943. The Displacement of Population in Europe. Montreal 1943.
- 1948. Europe on the Move: War and Population Changes, 1917–1947. New York 1948.
