= Demelza Hospice Care for Children =

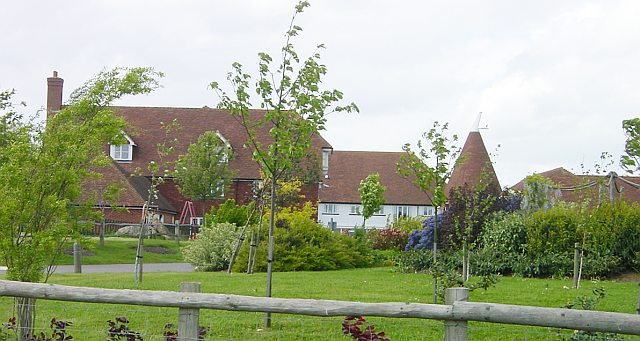
- Demelza House Children's Hospice

Geography
- Location: Kent, England

Organisation
- Type: Community
- Patron: Countess Mountbatten of Burma

Services
- Emergency department: No
- Beds: 10

History
- Founded: 1998

Links
- Lists: Hospitals in England

Demelza Hospice Care for Children, more commonly referred to as simply Demelza, is a children's hospice and a registered charity (no. 1039651) based in Kent, England, delivering clinical care and emotional support to babies, children and young people facing serious or life-limiting conditions, throughout Kent, South-East London and East Sussex. The charity is named after Demelza Phillips, daughter of founders Derek (c. 1941–2024) and Jennifer Phillips (c. 1940–2001), who died of a brain tumour at the age of 24 and subsequently inspired the creation of the first hospice in Sittingbourne in 1998.

== Services ==
With two residential hospices in Sittingbourne, Kent and Eltham, South East London, and a community hub in East Sussex, Demelza provides clinical care, symptom and medication management, step-down care and end of life care. Support services include: day care, short breaks, community care, support during pregnancy, family liaison support, sibling support, creative therapies, bereavement services, practical support, transition and memory making.

== Supporters ==
Demelza is supported by a number of Vice Presidents - celebrity ambassadors who help raise awareness of and funds for Demelza.

These include: actors Daniel Radcliffe and Sally Lindsay, Olympic Gold Medallists Robin Cousins and Jayne Torvill, former England footballer and BBC presenter Gary Lineker, Absolute Radio host Dave Berry), TV presenter and singer Cheryl Baker and broadcast journalist Sir Martyn Lewis.

The holder of the post of Archbishop of Canterbury is also a Vice President.
