= Frances Ritchie =

British nurse and Anglican religious sister (born 1942)

Personal life
- Born: 21 December 1942 (age 83)

Religious life
- Order: All Saints Sisters of the Poor

Frances Dominica Ritchie, OBE, DL, FRCN (Hon) (born 21 December 1942) is a British nurse and Anglican religious sister, specializing in palliative care. She founded Helen & Douglas House, two hospices ("respices") for seriously ill young people.

== Early life ==
Born Frances Dorothy Lyon Ritchie in Inverness, Scotland, in December 1942, she and her mother lived for three years in Greenock, where her grandfather was a solicitor and a Church of Scotland elder. When her father was demobbed the family moved to Richmond and later Roehampton.

Her younger brother, David Ritchie, was born when Frances was five years old and he had only one lung. Already knowing she wanted to be a nurse she helped to care for him at home and visited him when he was a patient in the Hospital for Sick Children, Great Ormond Street. She was educated at Cheltenham Ladies' College before returning to Great Ormond Street to train as a paediatric nurse. During her training she was seconded to the Middlesex Hospital to do her General Training.

Richie in 1966 joined the All Saints Sisters of the Poor, an Anglican religious community. She made vows in 1969 and was made Novice Guardian in 1973. She was elected Mother Superior General in 1977 at the age of 34, a position she held for 12 years.

== Helen House Hospice ==
In 1982, while she was at All Saints Convent in Oxford, she founded Helen House, a children's hospice, inspired by two-year-old Helen Worswick. Sister Frances met Worswick following surgery to remove a brain tumour, leaving her severely disabled. The friendship which developed between Frances and Worswick and her parents proved the inspiration for the world's first children's hospice.

The hospice was created to offer respite care with or without family members, stepped discharge from hospital and end of life care for children from birth to 16. Practical and emotional support for the whole family for as many years as they needed were integral in the philosophy. The concept has now been replicated on all continents.

== Douglas House ==
Recognising that young people with progressive life-shortening conditions were living much longer than they might once have done, Sister Frances went on to found Douglas House, a "respice" for people between the ages of 16 and 35 with life-shortening conditions. Named after a young man who had stayed many times in Helen House until he died aged 26, the house was opened by the Queen, accompanied by the Duke of Edinburgh in 2004. It is built in the same grounds as Helen House.

Sister Frances's involvement with Helen & Douglas House came to an end in 2013 due to unproven allegations of abuse; she was never charged and the allegations were not associated with the hospices. In 2018, amidst the charity's financial problems, she called for her role as a trustee to be reinstated, so that she could help resolve the problems but this was not granted.

Sister Frances is author of a book entitled Just My Reflection ... helping families to do things their way when their child dies first published in 1997.

== Recognition ==
In 2004 Sister Frances was a guest on the BBC Radio 4 programme Desert Island Discs.

Sister Frances is a Deputy Lieutenant of the County of Oxfordshire, and has received honorary degrees from four universities. She received the Templeton Project Trust Prize in 1986, was awarded an OBE in 2006 and Women of the Year award in 2007. In 2012 she was given a Lifetime Achievement award by Help the Hospices and the National Garden Scheme. In 1982 she was made an Honorary Fellow of the Royal College of Nursing and an Honorary Fellow of the Royal College of Paediatrics and Child Health.

Sister Frances is Founder of REACT (Rapid Effective Assistance for Children with potentially Terminal illness). She is the President of FACT (Falsely Accused Carers, Teachers and other professionals). She is a trustee of The Porch, originally started by the All Saints Sisters, now a separate charity offering day-long support for homeless and vulnerably-housed people wanting to move forward in their lives, away from street life and addiction.
