= Helen & Douglas House =

Hospice in Oxford, England

Coordinates: 51.7439°N 1.2323°W

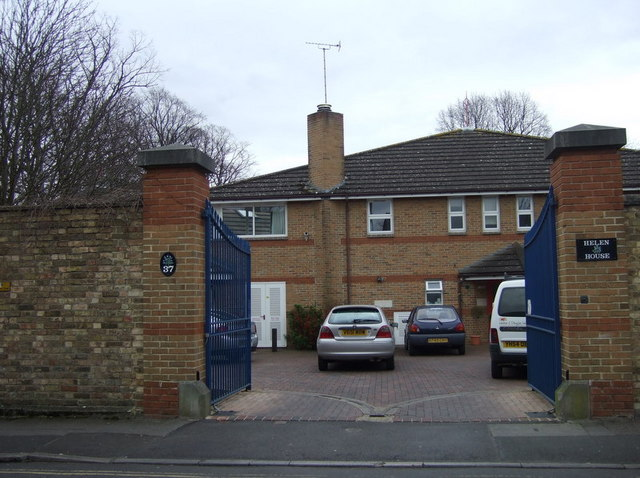
- Helen House

Geography
- Location: Oxford, England

Organisation
- Care system: Charity
- Type: Specialist
- Patron: The Queen

Services
- Emergency department: No
- Speciality: Palliative, respite, end-of-life and bereavement care to children

Helipads
- Helipad: No

History
- Founded: 1982

Links
- Website: www.helenanddouglas.org.uk
- Lists: Hospitals in England

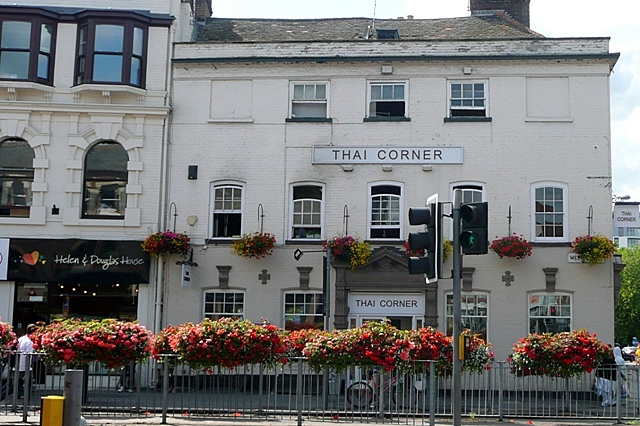
The shop on the left is a charity shop of Helen & Douglas House, next to the Thai Corner restaurant on the corner of West Street and Friar Street in Reading

Helen & Douglas House is a registered hospice charity (no. 1085951) based in Oxford, England, providing palliative, respite, end-of-life and bereavement care to life-limited children and their families.

== History ==
Helen House was the world's first children's hospice, set up in 1982 next to All Saints Convent by an All Saints Sister Frances Ritchie to provide respite care to the families of children with life-limiting conditions. Douglas House was set up in 2004 and was the world's first hospice built specifically for young adults. Queen Camilla is the charity's patron. The charity has been featured in two BBC documentary series, in 2007 and 2009.

== Services ==
The hospice provides specialist palliative and respite care for children as well as end of life and bereavement care.

The care is provided by a team of doctors, nurses, carers and therapists, and is supported in the main by donations from the public, with only approximately 15% of the £5 million annual budget coming from the public sector.

The hospice announced in June 2018 that it would discontinue the Douglas House care services for young adults effective immediately, due to lack of funding.
