= The Friary, Oxford =

The Friary
- Blessed Agnellus of Pisa Friary
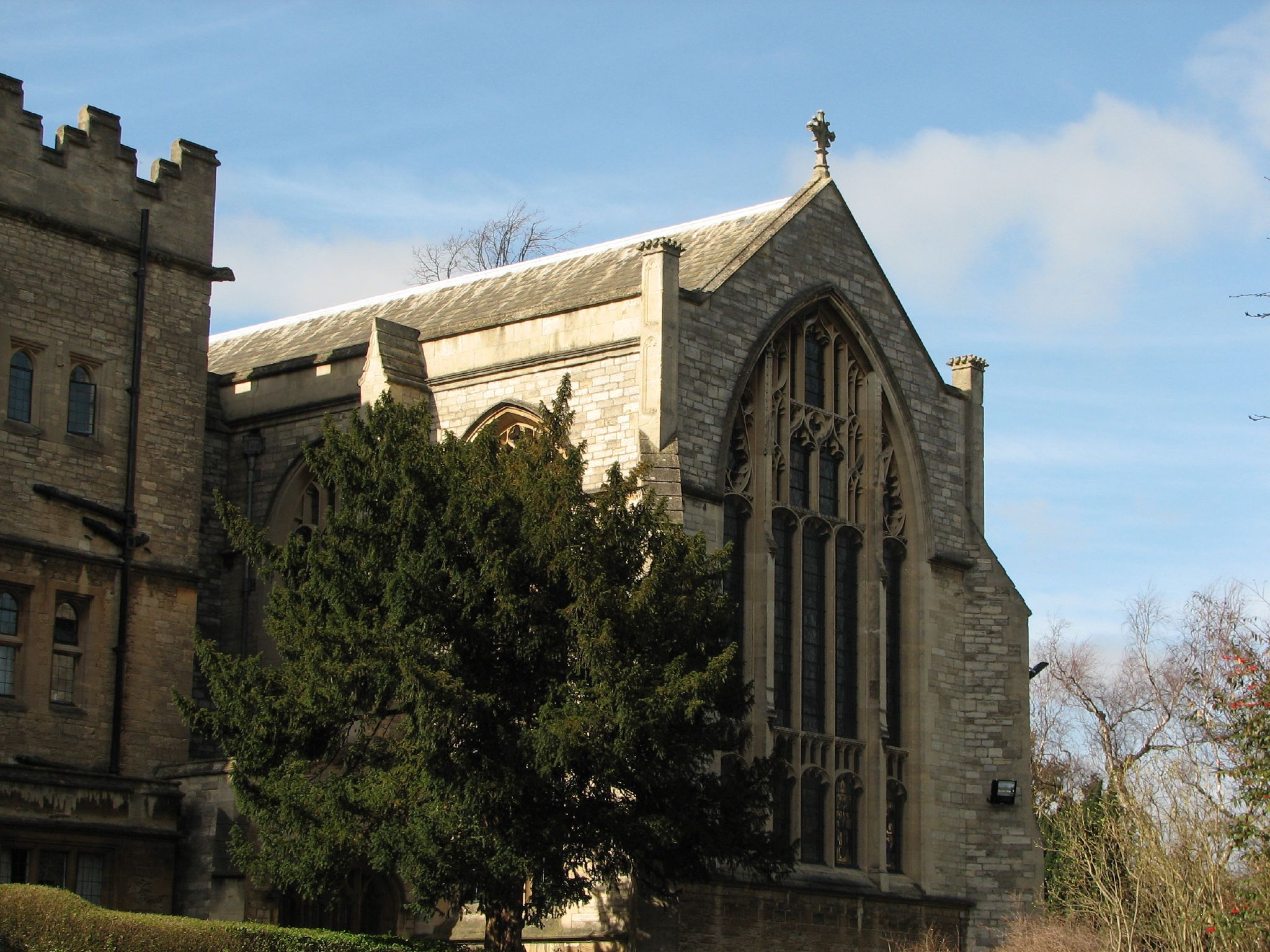
- The Friary
- 51.7442°N 1.2336°W
- OS grid reference: SP 53016 05359
- Location: Cowley, Oxford
- Country: England
- Denomination: Roman Catholic
- Previous denomination: Anglican
- Religious institute: Order of Friars Minor Conventual
- Website: thegreyfriars.org/oxford

History
- Former name(s): All Saints Convent; St John's Home
- Founded: 1873
- Dedication: Agnellus of Pisa
- Earlier dedication: All Saints
- Events: 2014, Franciscan Friary

Architecture
- Heritage designation: Grade II listed
- Designated: 28 June 1972
- Architect(s): Charles Buckeridge; J. L. Pearson; Ninian Comper
- Style: Gothic Revival

The Friary, formally known as Blessed Agnellus of Pisa Friary, formerly All Saints Convent or St John's Home is a centre of formation for the Franciscan Order of Friars Minor Conventual in Cowley, Oxford, England. The building was constructed in 1873 as the convent of the Anglican Society of All Saints Sisters of the Poor. It is situated between St Mary's Road and Cowley Road, next to St John's Care Home and Helen & Douglas House. The friary and its chapel are Grade II listed buildings.

== History ==
=== Construction ===
In 1869, the Society of All Saints Sisters of the Poor were invited to Oxford by the founder of the Society of St John the Evangelist, Richard Meux Benson to run the St John's Home hospital. A convent was needed to house the sisters working in the hospital. In 1873, the foundation stone was laid by Prince Leopold, Duke of Albany, for the adjacent convent to the south of the hospital.

The building was designed by Charles Buckeridge. From 1882 to 1891, further work was done to the building, overseen by the architect John Loughborough Pearson. In 1906, the present chapel, designed by Ninian Comper, was built. In 1982, Sister Frances Ritchie of the All Saints Sisters founded Helen & Douglas House next door.

=== Conventual Franciscans ===
In 2013, the Franciscan Order of Friars Minor Conventual returned to work in Oxford for the first time since the Reformation. They started a centre for formation in Holton. In July 2014, they moved to All Saints Convent after the All Saints sisters moved into a smaller residence.

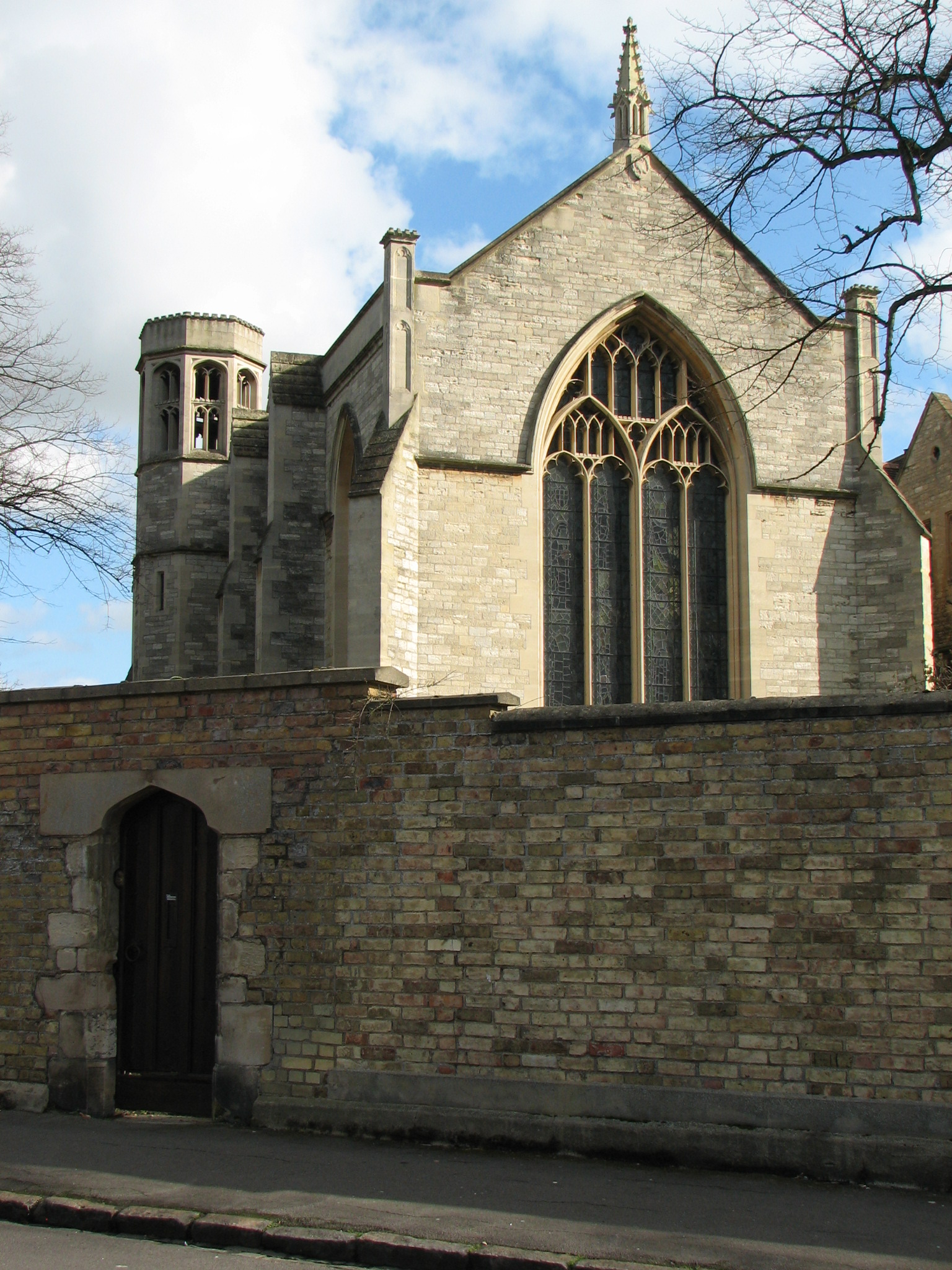
West end of chapel

== See also ==
- Greyfriars, Oxford
- List of monastic houses in England
