= Green Building Initiative =

The Green Building Initiative (GBI) is a 501(c)(3) nonprofit organization that owns and administers the Green Globes green building assessment and certification in the United States and Canada. It was established in 2004 and is headquartered in Portland, Oregon.

== History ==
GBI acquired the U.S. rights to the Green Globes building assessment and certification program in 2004 and adapted it for the U.S. market as an alternative to the commercial building rating system. The Green Globes certification program was launched in the U.S. in 2005 as an online building design management tool for architects and builders of sustainable commercial buildings. Green Globes originated from a system started in 1990 in the United Kingdom called BREEAM (Building Research Establishment Environmental Assessment Method). In an effort to make the tool more user-friendly, the standard was turned into a questionnaire-based rating tool. It was later converted to a web-based format, renamed Green Globes and marketed throughout the U.S. by GBI.

Green Globes originated from the UK's BREEAM system, with development starting in Canada in 1996, leading to the 2000 launch of "Green Globes for Existing Buildings". The system was adapted for the U.S. market, with the Green Building Initiative (GBI) acquiring the rights in 2004 and launching it there in 2005 as an online tool for new and existing commercial buildings. The program has since expanded to include versions for new construction, existing buildings, and sustainable interiors, with continuous refinement and international expansion efforts.

Green Globes eventually came to include modules for New Construction (NC), Existing Buildings (EB), Existing Healthcare Buildings and Sustainable Interiors (SI). GBI offers these programs to builders, designers and building managers.

In 2005, GBI was accredited as a standards developer through the American National Standards Institute (ANSI). It developed the ANSI/GBI 01-2010: Green Building Assessment Protocol for Commercial Buildings to guide the development of Green Globes products. The organization began updating the ANSI Standard in 2016, which was completed in 2018 and titled Green Globes Assessment Protocol for Commercial Buildings.

The nonprofit also provides training and certification for professionals who use their programs.

In 2011, GBI developed the Guiding Principles Compliance (GPC) program to measure compliance with the Federal Guiding Principles for Sustainable Buildings as required by Executive Order 13514 signed in 2009.

In January 2018, GBI acquired the global rights to Green Globes from JLL, which allowed GBI to support existing Green Globes users in Canada in addition to the United States, and to expand the rating system globally.

== Certification ==
Green Globes is a science-based building rating system for building owners and operators to select sustainability features. It uses a third-party certification for building owners to demonstrate sustainable features, operational efficiencies and measures to protect occupant health. Projects that have achieved over 35 percent of the 1,000 available points through third-party assessment can earn a rating of One to Four Green Globes.

| 85-100% | Four Green Globes | Demonstrates world-class leadership in resource efficiency, reducing environmental impacts, and improving occupant wellness. |
| 70-84% | Three Green Globes | Demonstrates outstanding success in resource efficiency, reducing environmental impacts, and improving occupant wellness. |
| 55-69% | Two Green Globes | Demonstrates significant achievement in resource efficiency, reducing environmental impacts, and improving occupant wellness. |
| 35-54% | One Green Globes | Demonstrates a strong commitment to resource efficiency, reducing environmental impacts, and improving occupant wellness. |

The Green Globes for New Construction certification includes two stages for assessment and certification. The preliminary assessment occurs after concept design when construction documents are available. The final assessment occurs when construction is complete. Users can evaluate their systems based on the number of applicable points in seven categories.

The evaluation walks through a sequence of criteria questions in an online portal. Once the questionnaire is completed, the user is introduced to their third-party Green Globes Assessor (GGA), who is an expert in green building design, engineering, construction, and facility operations. The Green Globes Assessor prepares a report that provides a list of achievements along with recommendations for sustainable building strategies. The assessor then performs an onsite assessment of the project to assert that the self-reported claims made in the online questionnaire and to suggest recommendations for improvement.

== Assessment ==
=== Green Globes for New Construction ===
Green Globes for New Construction (NC) is a system to evaluate, quantify, and improve the sustainability of new building projects. There are 1,000 available points across six environmental assessment areas.

| Assessment Area | Description | New Construction Points |
|---|---|---|
| Project Management | Integrated design, environmental purchasing, commissioning, and emergency response plan. | 100 |
| Site | Site development areas, reduce ecological impacts, enhancement of watershed features, and site ecology improvement. | 150 |
| Energy | Energy consumption, energy demand minimization, “right sized” energy-efficient systems, renewable sources of energy, energy-efficient transportation. | 260 |
| Water Efficiency | Flow and flush fixtures, water-conserving features, reduce off-site treatment of water. | 190 |
| Materials | Materials with low environmental impact, minimized consumption and depletion of material resources, re-use of existing structures; building durability, adaptability and disassembly; and reduction, re-use and recycling of waste. | 150 |
| Indoor Environment | Effective ventilation systems, source control of indoor pollutants, lighting design and integration of lighting systems, thermal comfort, acoustic comfort. | 150 |
| Total Points | | 1000 |

=== Green Globes for Existing Buildings ===
The Green Globes for Existing Buildings (EB) program is used by building owners and property managers to evaluate the building's current operating performance, create a baseline for performance, plan for improvements and monitor ongoing performance. There are 1,000 available points across seven environmental assessment areas.

| Assessment Area | Description | Existing Building Points |
|---|---|---|
| Energy | Energy consumption, energy demand minimization, “right sized” energy-efficient systems, renewable sources of energy, energy-efficient transportation. | 310 |
| Water | Flow and flush fixtures, water-conserving features, reduce off-site treatment of water. | 185 |
| Materials | Materials with low environmental impact, minimized consumption and depletion of material resources, re-use of existing structures; building durability, adaptability and disassembly; and reduction, re-use and recycling of waste. | 93 |
| Site | Site development areas, reduce ecological impacts, enhancement of watershed features, and site ecology improvement. | 100 |
| Indoor Environmental Quality | Effective ventilation systems, source control of indoor pollutants, lighting design and integration of lighting systems, thermal comfort, acoustic comfort. | 205 |
| ESG Management | | 107 |
| Total Points | | 1000 |

== Green Globes Professional Program ==
The Green Globes Professional (GGP) program is a network of individuals that guide clients through the Green Globes certification process. All applicants must demonstrate 5+ years of industry experience directly pertaining to commercial buildings. The curriculum covers green building concepts, Green Globes assessment protocols, Green Globes rating and certification, and case studies. It is approved by the American Institute of Architects (AIA) for 8 LU/HSW continuing education credits, and is web-based and self-paced.

== Guiding Principles Compliance ==
In 2011, GBI developed the Guiding Principles Compliance Assessment (GPC) program for use by federal agencies in assessing compliance with the Federal Interagency Sustainability Working Group's Guiding Principles for sustainable existing buildings as required by Executive Order 13514. The principles are a set of established criteria that are required to achieve federal sustainability goals. The two major elements of the GPC are a compliance survey and a third-party onsite assessment.

The GPC survey is broken down into six topic areas:

1. Employ Integrated Design Principles
2. Optimize Energy Performance
3. Protect and Conserve Water
4. Enhance Indoor Environmental Quality
5. Reduce the Environmental Impact of Materials
6. Assess and Consider Climate Change Risks

Agencies may choose to pursue either or both Green Globes certification and Guiding Principles Compliance.

In October 2013, the GSA claimed two tools, LEED and Green Globes, allow federal agencies to measure reduction targets for water, energy and greenhouse gas emissions against industry standards. It recommended that agencies use one of the two certification systems. By October 2016, the GSA's Office of Leasing added the option for Green Globes as green building rating certification systems to the Request for Lease Proposals (RLP) and lease language, citing the program as a nationally recognized green rating assessment, guidance and certification program for new construction projects, existing buildings and interior spaces.
