= All Saints Pastoral Centre =

Conference and retreat centre, St Albans, England

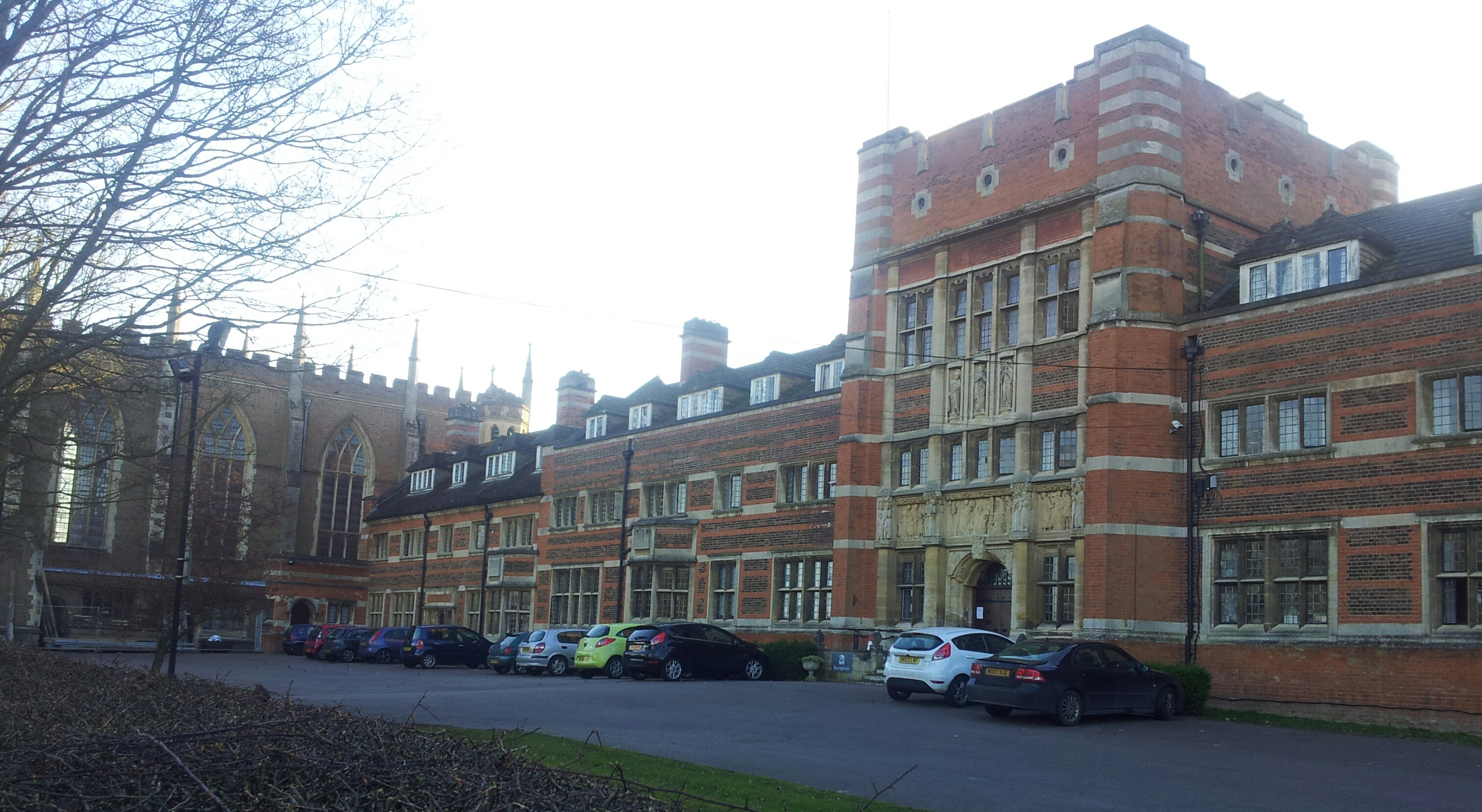
- All Saints Pastoral Centre, 2014

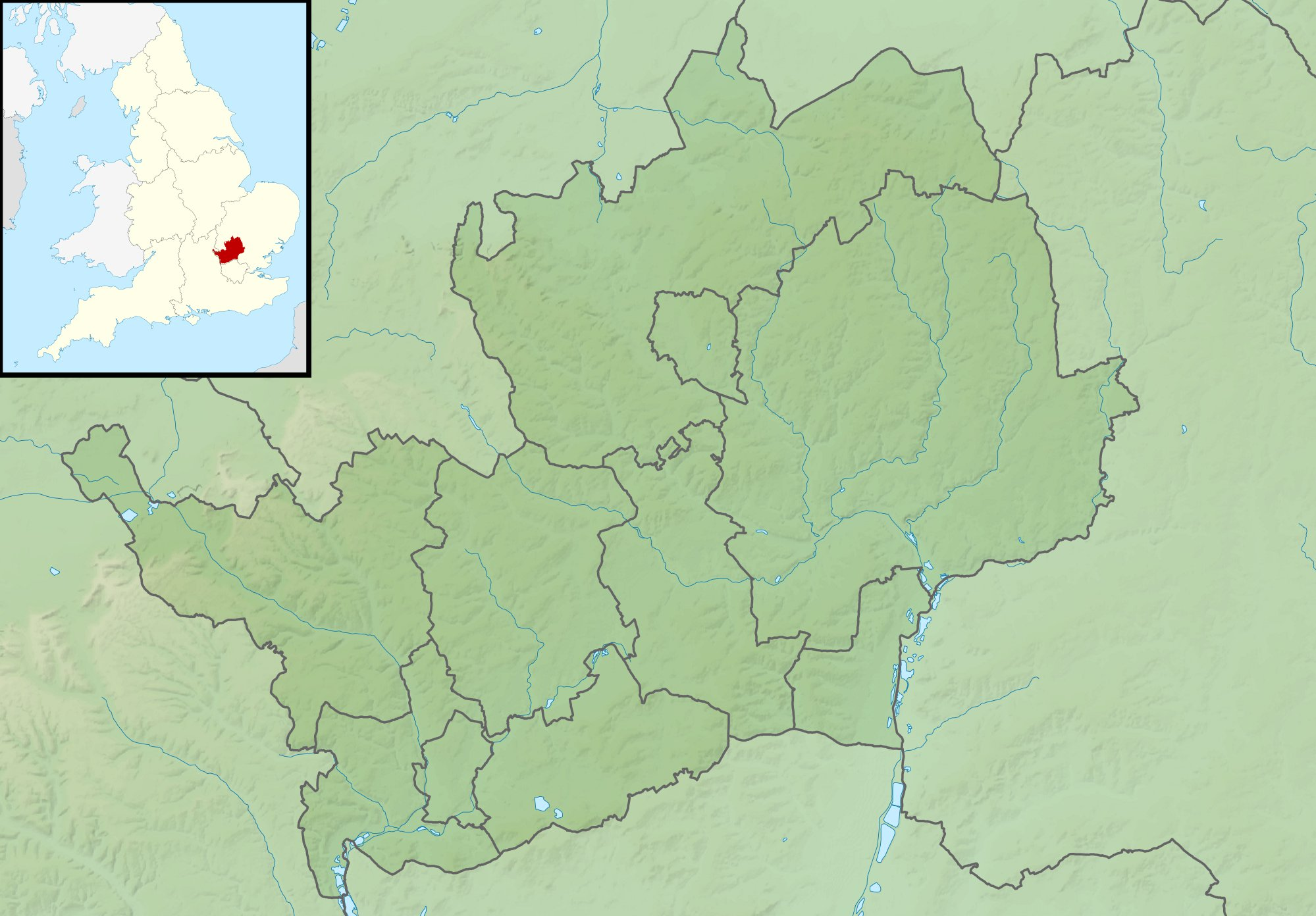
- Location within Hertfordshire Location within the United Kingdom

Religion
- Affiliation: Roman Catholic (former)
- Governing body: Archdiocese of Westminster (former)
- Status: Closed

Location
- Location: London Colney, Hertfordshire
- Country: United Kingdom
- Interactive map of All Saints Pastoral Centre
- Coordinates: 51.71179°N 0.30100°W

Architecture
- Architects: Leonard Stokes (convent); Sir Ninian Comper (chapel); Sebastian Comper (completion)
- Groundbreaking: 1899
- Completed: 1901 (main buildings) c.1960s (chapel begun, completed 1960s)
- Materials: Brick, stone, tile

Listed Building – Grade II*
- Official name: All Saints Pastoral Centre, including Chapel
- Designated: 23 June 1972
- Reference no.: 1295615

All Saints Pastoral Centre is a complex of buildings at London Colney on the southern outskirts of St Albans, Hertfordshire, England. It was built as a convent for the Anglican Society of All Saints Sisters of the Poor.

The original buildings were designed by Leonard Stokes in 1899 and built in 1901 with a chapel added by Ninian Comper. It was Grade II* listed in 1972. The complex was acquired by the Roman Catholic Archdiocese of Westminster in 1973 and converted for use as a pastoral centre. It was sold to a property developer in 2011 with the sale finalised in 2014.

The property remains undeveloped, and in 2019 it was included in the Twentieth Century Society's (C20) Top 10 Buildings at Risk List 2019.

== Design ==
The main structure is built around a garden and has an inner cloister leading to the meeting rooms. The building has adapted to modern requirements but has retained its original beauty. The centre today caters to both residential and non-residential conferences, meetings and retreats mainly from the religious sector, and has good transport access to the diocese via the M25 motorway and Radlett railway station, both close by.

== Comper Chapel ==
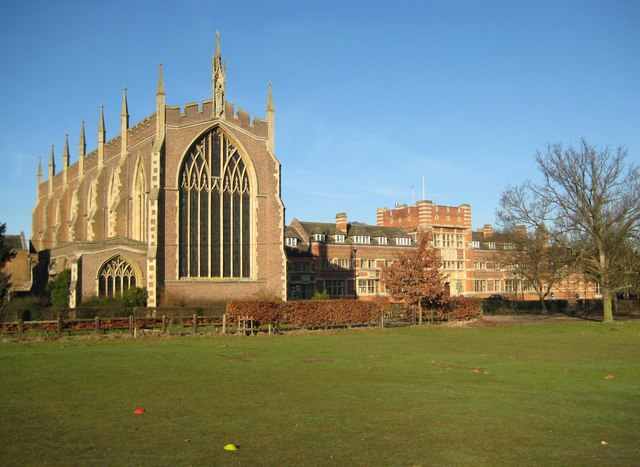
The Comper Chapel

Attached to All Saints is an example of design by architect Ninian Comper. The first half of the chapel was completed in 1927. Due to demands for space it was expanded by Sir Ninian's son Sebastian in 1963. In the west end of the chapel below the rose window is a Harrison & Harrison organ.

From the roof of the Comper Chapel, accessed via the bell tower, a panorama stretching from Radlett around to St Albans is visible. From the roof the join between the more recent Sebastian and original Ninian chapels can be seen with the use of a cross brace securing the north and south walls.

== See also ==
- Chantry Island, Hertfordshire
