= Guiding Principles =

Office building criteria for U.S. agencies

The Guiding Principles for Federal Leadership in High Performance and Sustainable Building (Guiding Principles, in short) are a set of established criteria developed by the U.S. Government for use by federal agencies committed to "federal leadership in the design, construction, and operation of High-Performance and Sustainable Buildings". Following this development effort, Executive Order 13514 was signed in 2009. Sec. 2(g) requires that: "(iii) at least 15 percent of the agency's existing buildings (above 5,000 gross square feet)…meet the Guiding Principles by fiscal year 2015…”.

== The Guiding Principles ==
1. Employ Integrated Design Principles
2. Optimize Energy Performance
3. Protect and Conserve Water
4. Enhance Indoor Environmental Quality
5. Reduce Environmental Impact of Materials

Each of these Guiding Principles has multiple criteria, ranging from reducing building energy use to meeting the EPA's recycled content recommendations.

== Guiding Principles compliance assessment ==
To measure compliance with the Guiding Principles, federal agencies have options that include EPA's Federal High Performance Sustainable Buildings Checklist, paper evaluations by internal staff, ad hoc evaluations by external consultants, and a commercially available product, the Guiding Principles Compliance Assessment Program from the Green Building Initiative, a 501(c)(3) nonprofit organization.

The Green Building Initiative developed the Guiding Principles Compliance Assessment Program as a third-party assessment and rating program for federal agencies. This program consists of a survey, third-party on-site assessment, compliance score and rating, and reports. The program focuses on gathering the building documentation necessary for verification of compliance, and providing it to a third-party assessor for review during an on-site assessment.
