= Loipersdorf-Kitzladen =

- Municipality
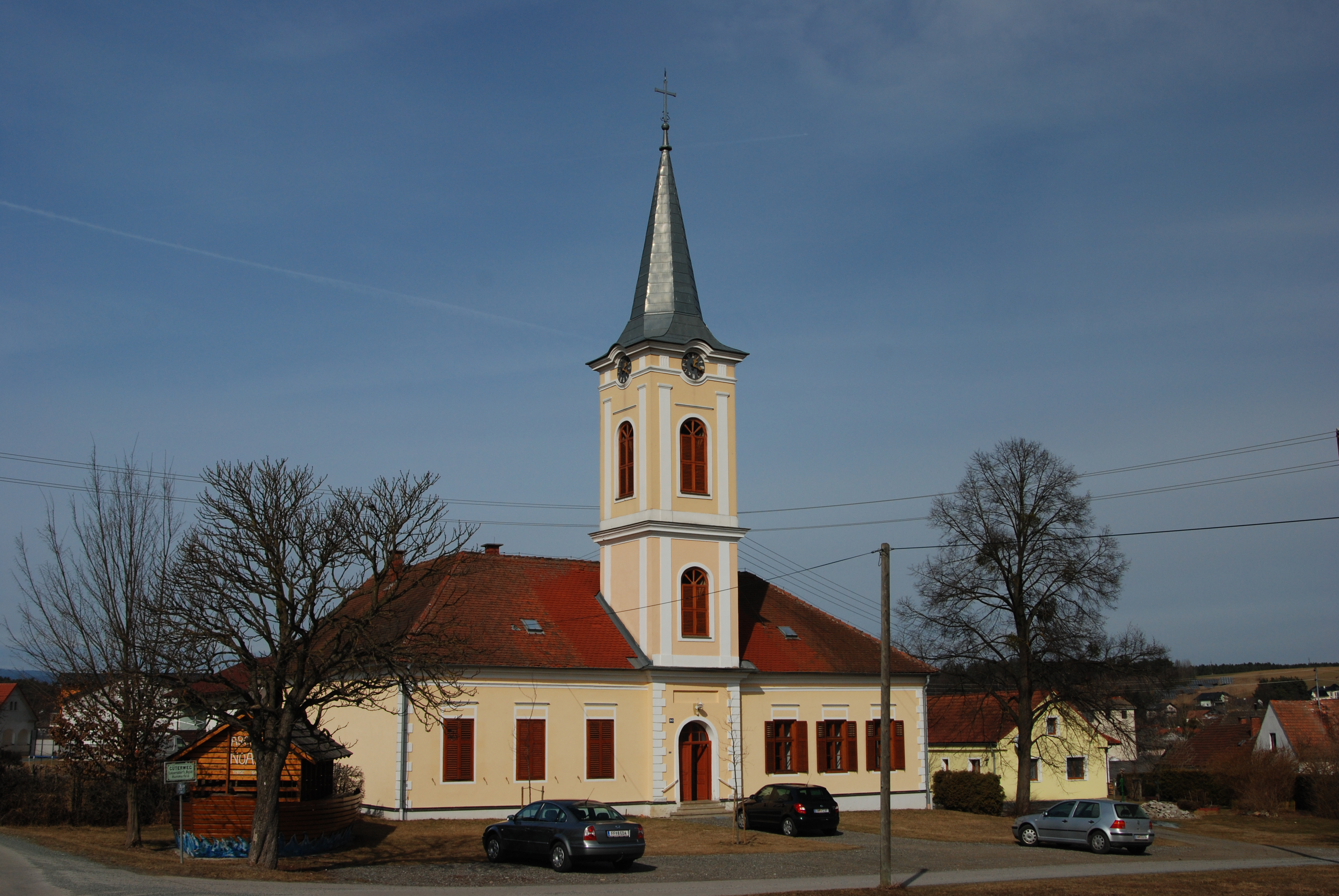
- Lutheran school and prayer house

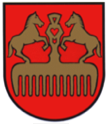
- Coat of arms

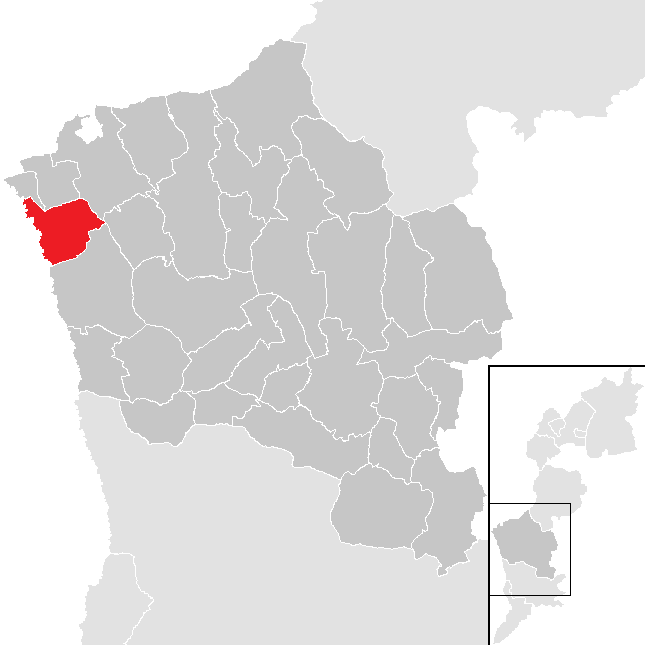
- Location within Oberwart district

- Location within Austria
- Coordinates: 47°20′N 16°5′E
- Country: Austria
- State: Burgenland
- District: Oberwart

Government
  - Mayor: Thomas Böhm

Area
  - Total: 15.88 km^{2} (6.13 sq mi)
- Elevation: 368 m (1,207 ft)

Population (2018-01-01)
  - Total: 1,319
  - Density: 83.06/km^{2} (215.1/sq mi)
- Time zone: UTC+1 (CET)
  - Summer (DST): UTC+2 (CEST)
- Postal code: 7411
- Website: www.loipersdorf-kitzladen.at

Loipersdorf-Kitzladen is a town in the district of Oberwart in the Austrian state of Burgenland.

== Population ==
Historical population
Year	Pop.	±%
1869	1,098	—
1880	1,156	+5.3%
1890	1,237	+7.0%
1900	1,289	+4.2%
1910	1,285	−0.3%
1923	1,235	−3.9%
1934	1,271	+2.9%
1939	1,247	−1.9%
1951	1,001	−19.7%
1961	1,046	+4.5%
1971	1,098	+5.0%
1981	1,165	+6.1%
1991	1,225	+5.2%
2001	1,260	+2.9%
2011	1,296	+2.9%
